= Patti Page singles discography =

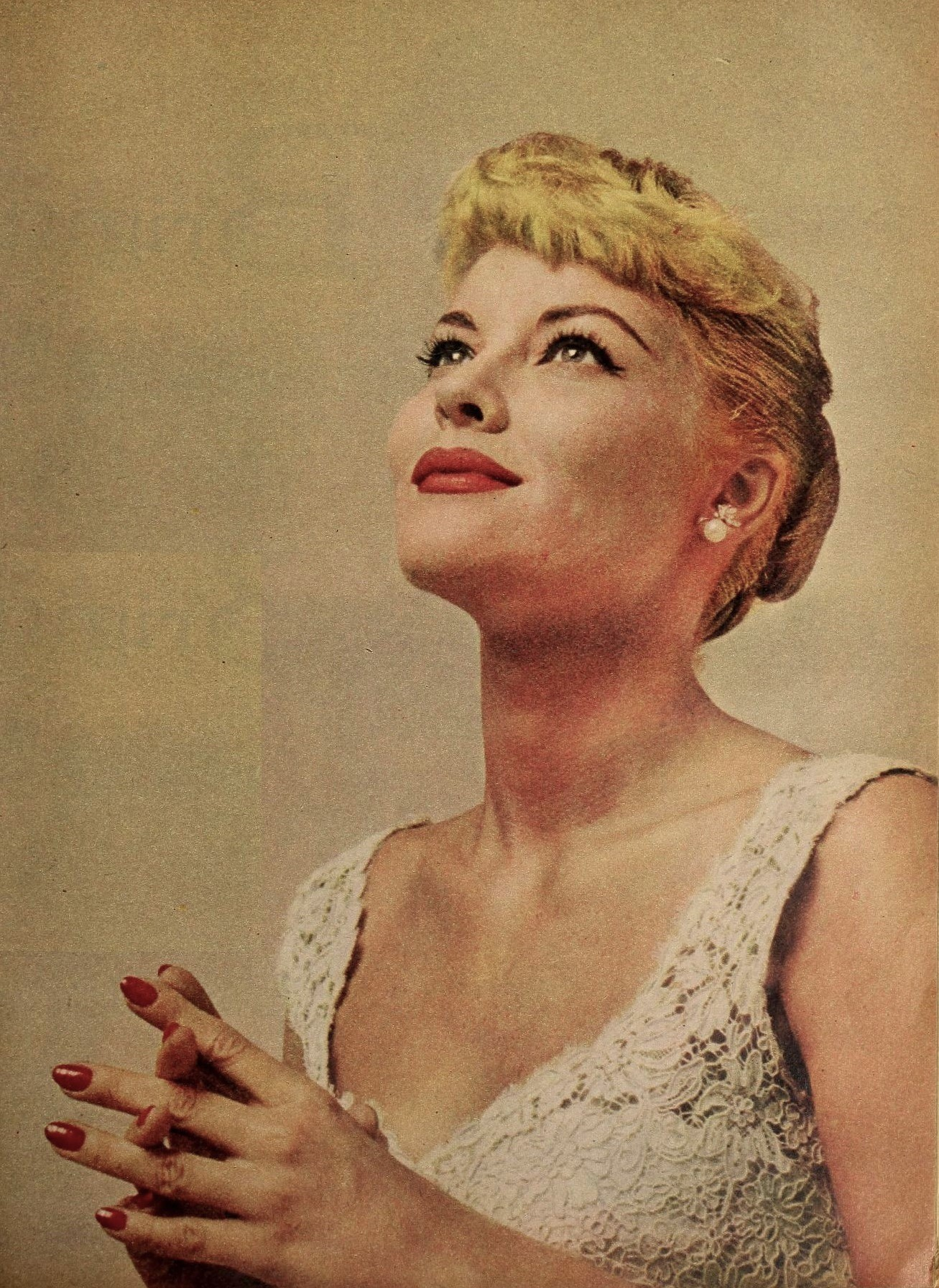
- Patti Page in 1959
- Lead artist singles: 127
- Collaborative singles: 7
- Christmas singles: 7
- Other charted songs: 19

The singles discography of American singer Patti Page contains 127 singles as a lead artist, seven as a collaboration with other artists, seven for the Christmas music market and 19 other charted songs. Page's singles were released for nearly 20 years on Mercury Records. Her debut release was 1947's "Every So Often". In 1948, Page had her first charting release with "Confess", peaking at number 12 on the American Billboard Hot 100. Four more singles reached the top 20 or 30 on the chart in the forties decade: "Say Something Sweet to Your Sweetheart" (a duet with Vic Damone), "So in Love", "I'll Keep the Lovelight Burning" and "Money, Marbles and Chalk". The latter also reached number 15 on the Billboard Hot Country Songs chart. In 1950, "I Don't Care If the Sun Don't Shine" became Page's first top ten Hot 100 single. It was followed by her first to top the charts called "All My Love (Bolero)". Also in 1950 came the release of "Tennessee Waltz". It topped the Hot 100 for several weeks, while also reaching number two on the Country Songs chart and her first to reach number one in Australia.

Page had six more top ten singles in 1951: "Would I Love You (Love You, Love You)", "Mockin' Bird Hill", "Mister and Mississippi", "Detour", "And So to Sleep Again" and "Come What May". "Mockin' Bird Hill" became her second number one release in Australia. In 1952, "I Went to Your Wedding" became Page's third chart-topping Hot 100 single. That year also included the top ten songs "Once in a While" and "Why Don't You Believe Me". Other charted songs (primarily B-sides on singles) reached top positions as well, such as 1952's "You Belong to Me". It peaked at number four on the Hot 100 and topped the Australian pop chart. Four more B-sides reached the Hot 100 top 20, such as 1952's "Conquest". In 1953, "The Doggie in the Window" became her fourth number one Hot 100 single and her fifth number one Australian single. It was also Page's only charting single in the United Kingdom, peaking at number nine. "Changing Partners" and "Butterflies" also reached the top ten. In 1954, Page had four top ten singles including the number two Hot 100 song "Cross Over the Bridge".

Page had top ten singles with less frequency beginning 1955. However, her songs continually made top 20 Hot 100 positions such as "Go on with the Wedding" (1955), "A Poor Man's Roses (Or a Rich Man's Gold)" (1957), and "Another Time, Another Place" (1958). She had top ten singles with "Allegheny Moon" (1956), "Old Cape Cod" (1957) and "Left Right Out of Your Heart" (1958). Her singles then began reaching lower top 40 and progressively-lower chart positions starting in 1959. In 1961, "Mom and Dad's Waltz" was a top 20 single on the Billboard adult contemporary chart. The follow-up releases "Most People Get Married" and "Go Home" reached the top ten on the same chart. The latter also peaked at number 13 on the Billboard country chart. Moving to Columbia Records, Page had her first top ten single in seven years with "Hush, Hush, Sweet Charlotte" in 1965. It reached the top ten on the American and Canadian pop charts.

Page continued to have top 20 and sometimes top ten singles on the Billboard adult contemporary chart in the sixties. This included 1966's "Almost Persuaded", 1967's "Walkin', Just Walkin'" and 1968's "Little Green Apples". Page's 1967 cover of "Gentle on Mind" reached number seven on the adult contemporary chart and number 66 on the Hot 100. In the seventies decade, Page's music was marketed towards country music. The 1970 singles "I Wish I Had a Mommy Like You" and "Give Him Love" reached top 30 positions on the Billboard country chart. Through 1975, Page's singles continually made the American country chart. Three of them made top 40 positions: "Make Me Your Kind of Woman" (1971), "Think Again" (1971) and "You're Gonna Hurt Me" (1973). Page returned to the country music market in 1981 with "No Aces". It was her final top 40 release on the Country Songs chart. In 1982, Page's single "My Man Friday" was her final release to chart.

== Lead artist singles ==
=== 1940s ===
List of singles, with selected chart positions, showing other relevant details
| Title | Year | Peak chart positions | | Album |
| Title | Year | US | US Cou. | Album |
|---|---|---|---|---|
| "Every So Often" | 1947 | — | — | —N/a |
| "I've Got Some Forgetting to Do" | 1947 | — | — | —N/a |
| "I'm Sorry I Didn't Say I'm Sorry" | 1947 | — | — | —N/a |
| "There's a Man in My Life" | 1947 | — | — | —N/a |
| "It's the Bluest Kind of Blues" | 1948 | — | — | —N/a |
| "Confess" | 1948 | 12 | — | Patti Page |
| "Ready Set Go" | 1948 | — | — | —N/a |
| "Tomorrow Night" | 1948 | — | — | —N/a |
| "My Sweet Adair" | 1948 | — | — | —N/a |
| "I Can't Go on Without You" | 1948 | — | — | —N/a |
| "Goody Goodbye" | 1948 | — | — | —N/a |
| "So in Love" | 1948 | 13 | — | Patti Page |
| "Streets of Laredo" | 1949 | — | — | —N/a |
| "Money, Marbles and Chalk" | 1949 | 27 | 15 | —N/a |
| "Cabaret" | 1949 | — | — | —N/a |
| "I'll Keep the Lovelight Burning" | 1949 | 27 | — | —N/a |
| "Just to Have Him Around" | 1949 | — | — | —N/a |
| "Dear Hearts and Gentle People" | 1949 | — | — | —N/a |
| "With My Eyes Wide Open, I'm Dreaming" | 1949 | 11 | — | Patti Page |
"—" denotes a recording that did not chart or was not released in that territory.

=== 1950s ===
List of singles, with selected chart positions, showing other relevant details
| Title | Year | Peak chart positions | | | | | Album |
| Title | Year | US | US Cou. | AUS | CAN | UK | Album |
|---|---|---|---|---|---|---|---|
| "I Don't Care If The Sun Don't Shine" | 1950 | 8 | — | — | — | — | I'll Remember April |
| "All My Love (Bolero)" | 1950 | 1 | — | 1 | — | — | Patti Page |
| "Back in Your Own Backyard" | 1950 | 23 | — | — | — | — | —N/a |
| "So in Love" | 1950 | — | — | — | — | — | —N/a |
| "Tennessee Waltz" | 1950 | 1 | 2 | 1 | — | — | Tennessee Waltz |
| "Would I Love You (Love You, Love You)" | 1951 | 4 | — | 19 | — | — | Tennessee Waltz |
| "Down the Trail of Achin' Hearts" | 1951 | 17 | — | — | — | — | Romance on the Range |
| "Mockin' Bird Hill" | 1951 | 2 | — | 1 | — | — | Romance on the Range |
| "Mister and Mississippi" | 1951 | 8 | — | 3 | — | — | —N/a |
| "Detour" | 1951 | 5 | — | 20 | — | — | Romance on the Range |
| "And So to Sleep Again" | 1951 | 4 | — | 20 | — | — | —N/a |
| "That's All I Ask of You" | 1951 | — | — | — | — | — | —N/a |
| "I Want to Be a Cowboy's Sweetheart" | 1951 | — | — | — | — | — | Romance on the Range |
| "Come What May" | 1951 | 9 | — | — | — | — | Tennessee Waltz |
| "Whispering Winds" | 1952 | 16 | — | — | — | — | —N/a |
| "Once in a While" | 1952 | 9 | — | — | — | — | —N/a |
| "I Went to Your Wedding" | 1952 | 1 | — | 1 | — | — | —N/a |
| "Why Don't You Believe Me" | 1952 | 4 | — | 6 | — | — | —N/a |
| "The Doggie in the Window" | 1953 | 1 | — | 1 | — | 9 | The Voices of Patti Page |
| "Now That I'm in Love" | 1953 | 18 | — | — | — | — | —N/a |
| "Butterflies" | 1953 | 10 | — | — | — | — | The Voices of Patti Page |
| "Arfie, the Doggie in the Window" | 1953 | — | — | — | — | — | —N/a |
| "Father, Father" | 1953 | 21 | — | — | — | — | —N/a |
| "My World Is You" | 1953 | — | — | — | — | — | —N/a |
| "Changing Partners" | 1953 | 3 | — | 4 | — | — | The Voices of Patti Page |
| "Cross Over the Bridge" | 1954 | 2 | — | 9 | — | — | —N/a |
| "Steam Heat" | 1954 | 8 | — | — | — | — | —N/a |
| "What a Dream" | 1954 | 10 | — | — | — | — | The Voices of Patti Page |
| "I Can't Tell a Waltz from a Tango" | 1954 | — | — | — | — | — | The Voices of Patti Page |
| "Let Me Go, Lover!" | 1954 | 8 | — | — | — | — | —N/a |
| "You Too Can Be a Dreamer" | 1955 | — | — | — | — | — | —N/a |
| "Don't Get Around Much Anymore" | 1955 | — | — | — | — | — | Music for Two in Love |
| "Little Crazy Quilt" | 1955 | — | — | — | — | — | The Voices of Patti Page |
| "I Love to Dance with You" | 1955 | — | — | — | — | — | The Voices of Patti Page |
| "Pidilly Patter Patter" | 1955 | 32 | — | 19 | — | — | —N/a |
| "Croce di Oro (Cross of Gold)" | 1955 | 16 | — | 39 | — | — | —N/a |
| "Go on with the Wedding" | 1955 | 11 | — | 19 | — | — | —N/a |
| "My First Formal Gown" | 1956 | 80 | — | — | — | — | —N/a |
| "Allegheny Moon" | 1956 | 2 | — | 3 | — | — | —N/a |
| "Mama from the Train" | 1956 | 11 | — | 31 | — | — | —N/a |
| "Repeat After Me" | 1956 | 53 | — | — | — | — | Manhattan Tower |
| "A Poor Man's Roses (Or a Rich Man's Gold)" | 1957 | 14 | — | 27 | — | — | —N/a |
| "Old Cape Cod" | 1957 | 3 | — | 14 | 4 | — | —N/a |
| "I'll Remember Today" | 1957 | 23 | — | — | 12 | — | —N/a |
| "Belonging to Someone" | 1957 | 13 | — | — | 18 | — | —N/a |
| "Another Time, Another Place" | 1958 | 20 | — | 66 | — | — | —N/a |
| "Left Right Out of Your Heart" | 1958 | 9 | — | 6 | 7 | — | —N/a |
| "Fibbin'" | 1958 | 39 | — | 22 | 15 | — | —N/a |
| "Trust in Me" | 1958 | 43 | — | — | 34 | — | —N/a |
| "The Walls Have Ears" | 1959 | 77 | — | — | — | — | —N/a |
| "With My Eyes Wide Open, I'm Dreaming" (rock 'n' roll version) | 1959 | 59 | — | — | — | — | —N/a |
| "Goodbye, Charlie" | 1959 | 90 | — | 71 | — | — | —N/a |
| "The Sound of Music" | 1959 | 90 | — | — | — | — | —N/a |
"—" denotes a recording that did not chart or was not released in that territory.

=== 1960s ===
List of singles, with selected chart positions, showing other relevant details
| Title | Year | Peak chart positions | | | | | | Album |
| Title | Year | US | US AC | US Cou. | AUS | CAN | CAN AC | Album |
|---|---|---|---|---|---|---|---|---|
| "Two Thousand, Two Hundred, Twenty-Three Miles" | 1960 | 67 | — | — | — | — | — | —N/a |
| "One of Us (Will Weep Tonight)" | 1960 | 31 | — | — | 73 | 13 | — | —N/a |
| "I Wish I'd Never Been Born" | 1960 | 52 | — | — | — | — | — | —N/a |
| "Don't Read the Letter" | 1960 | 65 | — | — | — | — | — | —N/a |
| "A City Girl Stole My Country Girl" | 1961 | 90 | — | — | — | — | — | —N/a |
| "Mom and Dad's Waltz" | 1961 | 58 | 14 | 21 | — | — | — | Patti Page Sings Country and Western Golden Hits |
| "Broken Heart and a Pillow Full of Tears" | 1961 | 91 | — | — | — | 30 | — | —N/a |
| "Go on Home" | 1961 | 42 | 9 | 13 | — | 39 | — | Patti Page Sings Go on Home |
| "Most People Get Married" | 1962 | 27 | 8 | — | 59 | — | — | —N/a |
| "The Boys' Night Out" | 1962 | 49 | — | — | — | 21 | — | —N/a |
| "Every Time I Hear Your Name" | 1962 | — | — | — | — | — | — | The Singing Rage |
| "High on the Hill of Hope" | 1963 | — | — | — | — | — | — | The Singing Rage |
| "Pretty Boy Lonely" | 1963 | 98 | — | — | 93 | — | — | —N/a |
| "Invitation to the Blues" | 1963 | — | — | — | — | — | — | Patti Page Sings Go on Home |
| "Say Wonderful Things" | 1963 | 81 | — | — | — | — | — | Say Wonderful Things |
| "Maybe He'll Come Back to Me" | 1963 | — | — | — | — | — | — | —N/a |
| "Love Letters" | 1963 | — | — | — | — | — | — | Say Wonderful Things |
| "I Adore You" | 1964 | — (Note: "I Adore You" did not enter the Hot 100, but peaked at number 31 on Bubbling Under Hot 100 Singles, which acts as a 25-song extension of the Hot 100) | — | — | — | — | — | Love After Midnight |
| "Drive in Movie" | 1964 | — | — | — | — | — | — | —N/a |
| "Drina" | 1964 | — | — | — | — | — | — | —N/a |
| "Days of the Waltz" | 1964 | — | — | — | — | — | — | —N/a |
| "Hush, Hush, Sweet Charlotte" | 1965 | 8 | 2 | — | — | 3 | 3 | Hush, Hush Sweet Charlotte |
| "You Can't Be True, Dear" | 1965 | 94 | 11 | — | — | — | — | —N/a |
| "Ribbons and Roses" | 1965 | — | 35 | — | — | — | — | —N/a |
| "Till You Come Back to Me" | 1966 | — (Note: "Till You Come Back to Me" did not enter the Hot 100, but peaked at number 30 on Bubbling Under Hot 100 Singles, which acts as a 25-song extension of the Hot 100) | — | — | — | — | — | —N/a |
| "In This Day and Age" | 1966 | — | 15 | — | — | — | — | —N/a |
| "Almost Persuaded" | 1966 | — (Note: "Almost Persuaded" did not enter the Hot 100, but peaked at number 13 on Bubbling Under Hot 100 Singles, which acts as a 25-song extension of the Hot 100) | 20 | — | — | — | — | —N/a |
| "Music and Memories" | 1966 | — | 37 | — | — | — | — | —N/a |
| "Wish Me a Rainbow" | 1967 | — | — | — | — | — | — | —N/a |
| "Walkin', Just Walkin'" | 1967 | — | 16 | — | — | — | — | —N/a |
| "All the Time" | 1967 | — | 23 | — | — | — | — | Today My Way |
| "Gentle on My Mind" | 1967 | 66 | 7 | — | — | — | — | Gentle on My Mind |
| "Little Green Apples" | 1968 | 96 | 12 | — | — | — | — | Gentle on My Mind |
| "Stand by Your Man" | 1968 | — (Note: "Stand by Your Man" did not enter the Hot 100, but peaked at number 21 on Bubbling Under Hot 100 Singles, which acts as a 25-song extension of the Hot 100) | 20 | — | — | — | — | —N/a |
| "The Love Song" | 1969 | — | 25 | — | — | — | 23 | —N/a |
| "Boy from the Country" | 1969 | — | — | — | — | — | — | —N/a |
"—" denotes a recording that did not chart or was not released in that territory.

=== 1970s ===
List of singles, with selected chart positions, showing other relevant details
| Title | Year | Peak chart positions | | | | Album |
| Title | Year | US Bub. | US AC | US Cou. | CAN Cou. | Album |
|---|---|---|---|---|---|---|
| "Pickin' Up the Pieces" | 1970 | — | — | — | — | —N/a |
| "I Wish I Had a Mommy Like You" | 1970 | 14 | — | 22 | 11 | —N/a |
| "Give Him Love" | 1970 | — | 26 | 24 | 23 | I'd Rather Be Sorry |
| "Make Me Your Kind of Woman" | 1971 | — | — | 37 | — | I'd Rather Be Sorry |
| "I'd Rather Be Sorry" | 1971 | — | — | 63 | — | I'd Rather Be Sorry |
| "Think Again" | 1971 | — | — | 38 | — | —N/a |
| "Jody and the Kid" | 1972 | — | — | — | — | —N/a |
| "Love Is a Friend of Mine" | 1972 | — | — | — | — | —N/a |
| "I Can't Sit Still" | 1973 | — | — | 42 | — | —N/a |
| "You're Gonna Hurt Me" | 1973 | — | — | 29 | 63 | —N/a |
| "Someone Came to See Me" | 1974 | — | — | 59 | — | —N/a |
| "I May Not Be Lovin' You" | 1974 | — | — | 70 | — | A Touch of Country |
| "Pour Your Lovin' on Me" | 1975 | — | — | — | — | A Touch of Country |
| "Less Than the Song" | 1975 | — | — | 67 | — | A Touch of Country |
"—" denotes a recording that did not chart or was not released in that territory.

=== 1980s ===
List of singles, with selected chart positions, showing other relevant details
| Title | Year | Peak chart positions | Album |
| Title | Year | US Country | Album |
|---|---|---|---|
| "No Aces" | 1981 | 39 | No Aces |
| "Wasn't It Good" | 1981 | — | No Aces |
| "A Poor Man's Roses (Or a Rich Man's Gold)" (Note: "A Poor Man's Roses (Or a Rich Man's Gold)" was re-recorded and released as a single on the Plantation record label in 1981.) | 1981 | 66 | No Aces |
| "My Man Friday" | 1982 | 80 | —N/a |
| "Barbara's Daughter" | 1982 | — | —N/a |
"—" denotes a recording that did not chart or was not released in that territory.

== Collaborative singles ==
List of singles, with selected chart positions, showing other relevant details
| Title | Year | Peak chart positions | | | Album |
| Title | Year | US | US Cou. | CAN Cou. | Album |
|---|---|---|---|---|---|
| "Say Something Sweet to Your Sweetheart" (with Vic Damone) | 1948 | 23 | — | — | —N/a |
| "You Was!" (with Vic Damone) | 1949 | — | — | — | —N/a |
| "Broken Down Merry-Go-Round" (with Rex Allen) | 1950 | — | — | — | —N/a |
| "Farther Along" (with Rex Allen) | 1950 | — | — | — | —N/a |
| "If I Were You Baby, I'd Love Me" (with Frankie Laine) | 1950 | — | — | — | —N/a |
| "Tag Along" (with Rex Allen) | 1951 | — | — | — | —N/a |
| "Hello We're Lonely" (with Tom T. Hall) | 1972 | — | 14 | 20 | —N/a |
"—" denotes a recording that did not chart or was not released in that territory.

== Christmas singles ==
List of singles, with selected chart positions, showing other relevant details
| Title | Year | Peak chart positions | Album |
| Title | Year | US Christmas | Album |
|---|---|---|---|
| "Boogie Woogie Santa Claus" | 1950 | — | —N/a |
| "Christmas Bells" | 1951 | — | Christmas with Patti Page (1951 album) |
| "Christmas Choir" | 1951 | — | Christmas with Patti Page (1951 album) |
| "Santa Claus Is Coming to Town" | 1951 | — | Christmas with Patti Page (1951 album) |
| "White Christmas" | 1951 | — | Christmas with Patti Page (1951 album) |
| "I Wanna Go Skating with Willie" | 1954 | — | Christmas with Patti Page (1951 album) |
| "Happy Birthday Jesus (A Child's Prayer)" | 1965 | 16 | Christmas with Patti Page (1965 album) |
"—" denotes a recording that did not chart or was not released in that territory.

== Other charted songs ==
List of songs, with selected chart positions, showing other relevant details
| Title | Year | Peak chart positions | | | | | Album | Notes |
| Title | Year | US | US AC | US Cou. | AUS | CAN Cou. | Album | Notes |
|---|---|---|---|---|---|---|---|---|
| "Ever True Ever More" | 1951 | 24 | — | — | — | — | —N/a | (Note: Released as the B-side to the single "Down the Trail of Achin' Hearts".) |
| "These Things I Offer You" | 1951 | 26 | — | — | — | — | —N/a | (Note: Released as the B-side to the single "Mister and Mississippi".) |
| "Retreat (Cries My Heart)" | 1951 | 22 | — | — | — | — | —N/a | (Note: Released as the B-side to the single "Come What May".) |
| "You Belong to Me" | 1952 | 4 | — | — | 1 | — | —N/a | (Note: Released as the B-side to the single "I Went to Your Wedding".) |
| "Conquest" | 1952 | 18 | — | — | — | — | —N/a | (Note: Released as the B-side to the single "Why Don't You Believe Me".) |
| "My Jealous Eyes" | 1953 | 17 | — | — | — | — | —N/a | (Note: Released as the B-side to the single "The Doggie in the Window".) |
| "Oo! What You Do to Me" | 1953 | 16 | — | — | — | — | —N/a | (Note: Released as the B-side to the single "Now That I'm in Love".) |
| "This Is My Song" | 1953 | 20 | — | — | — | — | —N/a | (Note: Released as the B-side to the single "Butterflies".) |
| "Search My Heart" | 1955 | — | — | — | 27 | — | —N/a | (Note: Released as the B-side to the single "Croce De Oro".) |
| "Too Young to Go Steady" | 1956 | 73 | — | — | — | — | —N/a | (Note: Released as the B-side to the single "My First Formal Gown".) |
| "The Strangest Romance" | 1956 | 93 | — | — | — | — | —N/a | (Note: Released as the B-side to the single "Allegheny Moon".) |
| "Every Time (I Feel His Spirit)" | 1956 | 87 | — | — | — | — | —N/a | (Note: Released as the B-side to the single "Mama from the Train".) |
| "The Wall" | 1957 | 43 | — | — | — | — | —N/a | (Note: Released as the B-side to the single "A Poor Man's Roses (Or a Rich Man's Gold)".) |
| "You'll Answer to Me" | 1961 | 46 | 11 | — | — | — | —N/a | (Note: Released as the B-side to the single "Mom and Dad's Waltz".) |
| "Just a Simple Melody" | 1963 | — (Note: "Just a Simple Melody" did not enter the Hot 100, but peaked at number 14 on Bubbling Under Hot 100 Singles, which acts as a 25-song extension of the Hot 100) | — | — | — | — | —N/a | (Note: Released as the B-side to the single "Pretty Boy Lonely".) |
| "Till You Come Back to Me" | 1966 | — (Note: "Till You Come Back to Me" did not enter the Hot 100, but peaked at number 30 on Bubbling Under Hot 100 Singles, which acts as a 25-song extension of the Hot 100) | — | — | — | — | —N/a | (Note: Released as the B-side to the single "Pretty Boy Lonely".) |
| "Same Old You" | 1967 | — | 16 | — | — | — | Today My Way | (Note: Released as the B-side to the single "Walkin', Just Walkin'".) |
| "Woman Left Lonely" | 1971 | — | — | — | — | 31 | —N/a | (Note: Released as the B-side to the single "Think Again".) |
| "On the Inside" | 1981 | — | — | 76 | — | — | Aces | (Note: Released as the B-side to the re-recorded single "A Poor Man's Roses (Or a Rich Man's Gold)".) |
"—" denotes a recording that did not chart or was not released in that territory.
