= List of songs recorded by Patti Page =

This is a partial list of Patti Page's recorded songs:

Song	Music by	Lyrics by	Year	Notes
A
"All My Love (Bolero)"	Paul Durand	French: Henri Contet; English: Mitchell Parish	1950	
"Allegheny Moon"	Al Hoffman; Dick Manning		1956	
"All the Time"	Mel Tillis; Wayne P. Walker		1967	
"Almost Persuaded"	Glenn Sutton; Billy Sherrill		1966	
"And So to Sleep Again"	Joe Marsala; Sunny Skylar		1951	
"Another Time, Another Place"	Jay Livingston	Ray Evans	1958	
B
"Back in Your Own Backyard"	Al Jolson; Billy Rose; Dave Dreyer		1950	
"Belonging to Someone"	Al Hoffman; Dick Manning		1958	
"Boys' Night Out"	Jimmy Van Heusen	Sammy Cahn	1962	
"Broken Heart and a Pillow Full of Tears"	Paul Anka		1961	
"Butterflies"	Bob Merrill		1953	
C
"Changing Partners"	Larry Coleman	Joe Darion	1953	
"A City Girl Stole My Country Boy"			1961	
"Come What May"	Al Sanchez	Allen Schiller	1952	
"Confess"	Bennie Benjamin; George David Weiss		1948	
"Conquest"	Corky Robbins		1952	Covered by The White Stripes on their 2007 album Icky Thump.
"Croce Di Oro (Cross of Gold)"	James "Kim" Gannon		1955	
"Cross Over the Bridge"	Bennie Benjamin; George David Weiss		1954	
"Custody"			1966	
D
"Detour"	Paul Westmoreland		1951	
"The Doggie in the Window"	Bob Merrill		1953	
"Don't Read the Letter"			1961	
"Down in the Valley"	Traditional		1955	on her 1955 album Romance on the Range.
"Down the Trail of Achin' Hearts"	Jimmy Kennedy; Nat Simon		1951	
E
"Ever True, Evermore"			1951	
"Every Time I Feel the Spirit"			1956	
F
"Father, Father"			1953	
"Fibbin'"	Michael Merlo	Patrick Welch	1958	
G
"Gentle on My Mind"	John Hartford		1968	
"Give Him Love"			1971	
"Goodbye Charlie"			1959	
"Go on Home"			1961	
"Go on with the Wedding"	Arthur Korb; Charlie Purvis; Milt Yakus		1956	
H
"Happy Birthday, Jesus"			1967	
"Hello, We're Lonely"			1973	
"Hush...Hush Sweet Charlotte"	Frank DeVol	Mack David	1965	
I
"I Can't Sit Still"			1973	
"I Can't Tell a Waltz from a Tango"	Al Hoffman; Dick Manning		1954	covered in the United Kingdom by Alma Cogan, whose hit on the UK charts was bigger than Patti Page's was in the US
"I Cried"	Michael Elias; Billy Duke		1954	
"I Don't Care if the Sun Don't Shine"	Mack David		1950	
"I'd Rather Be Sorry"			1971	
"I'll Keep the Lovelight Burning"	Bennie Benjamin; George David Weiss		1949	
"I'll Remember Today"	Edith Piaf	William Engvick	1957	
"I May Not Be Lovin' You"			1974	
"In This Day and Age"			1966	
"I Take It Back"	Buddy Buie; J. R. Cobb		1967	
"I Went to Your Wedding"	Jessie Mae Robinson		1952	
"I Wish I'd Never Been Born"			1960	
"I Wish I Had a Mommy Like You"			1970	
K
"Keep Me in Mind"	Burt Bacharach	Jack Wolf	1955	
L
"Left Right Out of Your Heart (Hi Lee Hi Lo Hi Lup Up Up)"	Mort Garson	Earl Shuman	1958	
"Less than the Song"			1975	
"Let Me Go, Lover!"	Jenny Lou Carson; Al Hill		1954	better-known version was recorded by Joan Weber
"Little Green Apples"	Bobby Russell		1968	
"The Love Song"			1969	
"Lover, Come Back to Me"	Sigmund Romberg	Oscar Hammerstein II|	1959	
M
"Mad About the Boy"	Noël Coward			
"Make Me Your Kind of Woman"			1971	
"The Mama Doll Song"	Nat Simon	Charles Tobias	1954	
"Mama from the Train"	Irving Gordon		1956	
"Milwaukee Polka"			1953	
"Mister And Mississippi"	Irving Gordon		1951	
"Mockin' Bird Hill"	Vaughn Horton		1951	
"Mom and Dad's Waltz"			1961	
"Money, Marbles, and Chalk"	Garner "Pop" Eckler		1949	
"Most People Get Married"	Leon Carr	Earl Shuman	1962	
"Music and Memories"			1966	
"My First Formal Gown"			1956	
"My Jealous Eyes"			1953	
"My Man Friday"			1982	
"My Restless Lover"			1954	
N
"No Aces"			1981	
"Now that I'm in Love"			1953	
O
"Old Cape Cod"	Claire Rothrock; Milt Yakus; Allan Jeffrey		1957	
"Once in a While"	Michael Edwards	Bud Green	1952	
"One of Us (Will Weep Tonight)"	Fred Tobias	Clint Ballard, Jr.	1960	
"On the Inside"			1981	
"Oo! What You Do to Me"			1953	
P
"A Poor Man's Roses (or a Rich Man's Gold)"	Bob Hilliard; Milton DeLugg		1957	
"A Poor Man's Roses (or a Rich Man's Gold)"	Bob Hilliard; Milton DeLugg		1981	
"Pretty Boy Lonely"			1963	
R
"Repeat after Me"			1957	
"Retreat"	Nancy Farnsworth; Tommy Furtado; Anita Boyer		1952	
"Ribbons and Roses"			1965	
S
"Same Old You"			1967	
"Say Something Sweet"	Sid Tepper; Roy C. Bennett		1948	
"Say Wonderful Things"	Philip Green	Norman Newell	1963	
"So In Love"	Cole Porter		1949	
"Someone Came to See Me"			1974	
"Stand By Your Man"	Tammy Wynette; Billy Sherrill		1968	
"Steam Heat"	Richard Adler; Jerry Ross		1954	
"The Strangest Romance"	Fay Tishman		1956	
T
"That Old Feeling"	Sammy Fain	Lew Brown	1955	
"The Tennessee Waltz"	Redd Stewart; Pee Wee King		1950	
"These Things I Offer You"			1951	
"Think Again"			1971	
"This Is My Song"	Dick Charles		1953	
"Too Young to Go Steady"			1956	
"Trust in Me"	Ned Wever; Milton Ager; Jean Schwartz		1958	better-known version was recorded by Eddie Fisher
"Two Thousand Two Hundred Twenty-three Miles			1960	
W
"Walkin' - Just Walkin'"			1967	
"The Wall"	Oramay Diamond /Clyde Otis/Dave Dreyer		1957	
"The Walls Have Ears"			1959	
"What A Dream"	Chuck Willis		1954	
"Whispering Winds"			1952	
"Why Don't You Believe Me"	Lew Douglas; King Laney; Roy Rodde		1952	better-known version was recorded by Joni James
"With My Eyes Wide Open I'm Dreaming"	Harry Revel	Mack Gordon	1950	
"With My Eyes Wide Open I'm Dreaming"	Harry Revel	Mack Gordon	1959	
"Woman Left Lonely"			1971	
"Wondering"	Jack Schafer		1957	
"Would I Love You (Love You, Love You)"	Harold Spina	Bob Russell	1951	
Y
"You Belong to Me"	Pee Wee King; Redd Stewart; Chilton Price		1952	better-known version was recorded by Jo Stafford
"You Can't Be True, Dear"	Hans Otten; Ken Griffin	German: Gerhard Ebeler; English: Hal Cotten	1965	originally recorded in 1948 by Ken Griffin
"You'll Answer to Me"			1961	
"You're Gonna Hurt Me"			1973	
