= Patti Page albums discography =

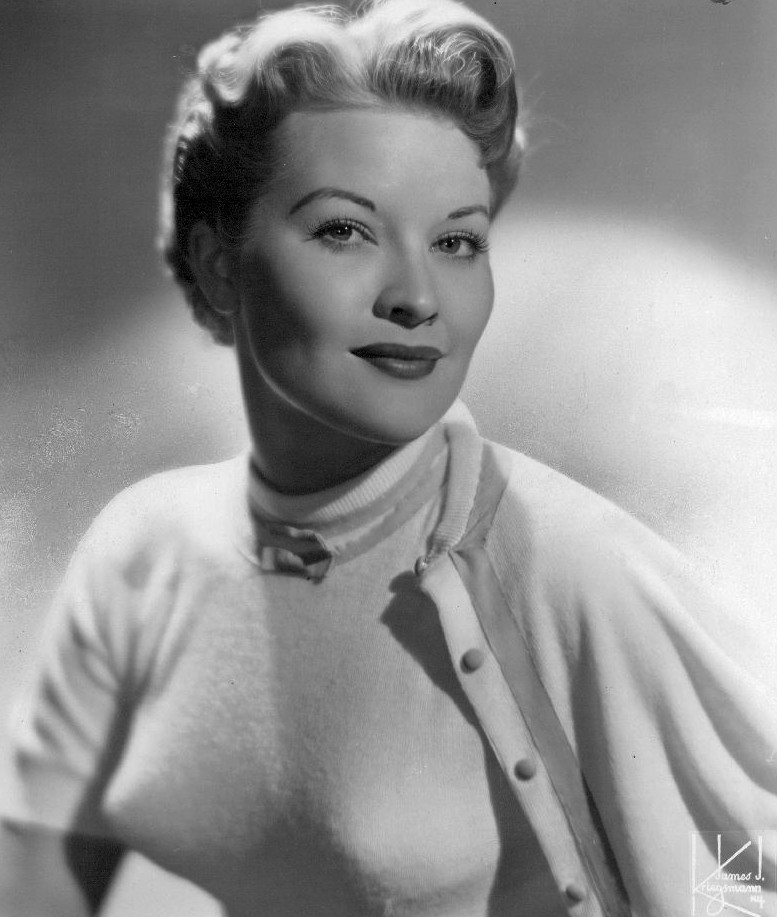
- Patti Page in 1955.
- Studio albums: 47
- Live albums: 2
- Compilation albums: 40
- Video albums: 3
- Box sets: 1
- Other album appearances: 4

The albums discography of American singer Patti Page contains 47 studio albums, 40 compilation albums, three live albums, three video albums, one box set and has made four album appearances. Page's self-titled debut studio album was released in 1950 and featured several of her charting singles from the previous two years. Mercury Records released all of Page's albums during the fifties decade. Many of the album were centered around themes, such as 1951's Folk Song Favorites and Christmas with Patti Page. Only some of her studio albums featured her popular singles, such as 1952's Tennessee Waltz. Instead, her singles were collected on a series of compilations such as 1955's Page 1 – A Collection of Her Most Famous Songs. Three more of these compilations appeared. The 1956 concept studio album, Manhattan Tower, was Page's first to make any album chart. It reached number 18 on the Billboard 200. Several more studio albums appeared on Mercury through 1959.

In 1960, Mercury released Page's first album of spiritual music titled Just a Closer Walk with Thee. The label also issued two albums of country music: Patti Page Sings Country and Western Golden Hits (1961) and Go on Home (1962). Her next disc to make the Billboard 200 was 1962's Patti Sings Golden Hits of the Boys. In 1963, she released her first album with Columbia Records titled Say Wonderful Things. It reached number 83 on the Billboard 200. Her highest-charting album on the Billboard 200 was 1965's Hush, Hush, Sweet Charlotte, which peaked at number 27. Page's second Christmas-themed disc was also released in 1965. It was followed by a studio album of hymns and a re-recorded studio project of her greatest hits.

Page remained with Columbia through 1970, releasing 1968's Gentle on My Mind. It was her final charting disc on the Billboard 200. Page returned to the Mercury label in the early seventies. The label issued only one studio album of her material in 1971 called I'd Rather Be Sorry. Another album of country material, it reached number 37 on the Billboard Top Country Albums chart. Another studio album of country music appeared in 1979 on the 51 West label called A Touch of Country. Moving briefly to Plantation Records, the label released No Aces in 1981. They also issued two studio albums of re-recorded singles. Over the next two decades, her previous labels issued a variety of compilation projects. Page returned in 1998 with the live album Live at Carnegie Hall: The 50th Anniversary Concert. In the 2000s decade, three studio albums by Page were released. Her final studio album was released on Curb Records in 2008 called Best Country Songs.

== Studio albums ==
=== 1950s ===
List of studio albums, with selected chart positions, showing other details
Title	Album details	Peak chart positions
Title	Album details	US
Patti Page	Released: 1950; Label: Mercury; Formats: LP	—
Folk Song Favorites	Released: 1951; Label: Mercury; Formats: LP	—
Christmas with Patti Page	Released: 1951; Label: Mercury; Formats: LP	—
Tennessee Waltz	Released: 1952; Label: Mercury; Formats: LP	—
Patti Page Sings for Romance	Released: 1953; Label: Mercury; Formats: LP	—
Song Souvenir	Released: 1954; Label: Mercury; Formats: LP	—
Just Patti	Released: 1954; Label: Mercury; Formats: LP	—
Patti's Songs	Released: 1954; Label: Mercury; Formats: LP	—
So Many Memories	Released: 1954; Label: Mercury; Formats: LP	—
...And I Thought About You	Released: 1955; Label: Mercury; Formats: LP	—
Romance on the Range	Released: July 1955; Label: Mercury; Formats: LP	—
Manhattan Tower	Released: October 1956; Label: Mercury; Formats: LP	18
In the Land of Hi-Fi	Released: November 1956; Label: Mercury; Formats: LP	—
Music for Two in Love	Released: 1956; Label: Mercury; Formats: LP	—
You Go to My Head	Released: 1956; Label: Mercury; Formats: LP	—
The Voices of Patti Page	Released: 1956; Label: Mercury; Formats: LP	—
The East Side	Released: August 1957; Label: Mercury; Formats: LP	—
The Waltz Queen	Released: October 1957; Label: Mercury; Formats: LP	—
I've Heard That Song Before	Released: May 1958; Label: Mercury; Formats: LP	—
Let's Get Away from It All	Released: May 1958; Label: Mercury; Formats: LP	—
The West Side	Released: September 1958; Label: Mercury; Formats: LP	—
On Camera...Patti Page...Favorites From TV	Released: February 1959; Label: Mercury; Formats: LP	—
Indiscretion	Released: June 1959; Label: Mercury; Formats: LP	—
I'll Remember April	Released: July 1959; Label: Mercury; Formats: LP	—
3 Little Words	Released: September 1959; Label: Mercury; Formats: LP	—
"—" denotes a recording that did not chart or was not released in that territory.

=== 1960s ===
List of studio albums, with selected chart positions, showing other details
Title	Album details	Peak chart positions
Title	Album details	US
Just a Closer Walk with Thee	Released: September 1960; Label: Mercury; Formats: LP	—
Patti Page Sings and Stars in "Elmer Gantry"	Released: January 1961; Label: Mercury; Formats: LP	—
Patti Page Sings Country and Western Golden Hits	Released: May 1961; Label: Mercury; Formats: LP	—
Go on Home	Released: March 1962; Label: Mercury; Formats: LP	—
Patti Sings Golden Hits of the Boys	Released: July 1962; Label: Mercury; Formats: LP	115
Say Wonderful Things	Released: August 1963; Label: Columbia; Formats: LP	83
Love After Midnight	Released: July 1964; Label: Columbia; Formats: LP	—
Hush, Hush, Sweet Charlotte	Released: March 1965; Label: Columbia; Formats: LP	27
Christmas with Patti Page	Released: November 1965; Label: Columbia; Formats: LP	51
Patti Page Sings America's Favorite Hymns	Released: May 1966; Label: Columbia; Formats: LP	—
Patti Page's Greatest Hits (Note: Patti Page's Greatest Hits was not a compilation album, but rather a studio album of re-recordings.)	Released: July 1966; Label: Columbia; Formats: LP	—
Today My Way	Released: October 1967; Label: Columbia; Formats: LP	—
Gentle on My Mind	Released: June 1968; Label: Columbia; Formats: LP	168
"—" denotes a recording that did not chart or was not released in that territory.

=== 1970s ===
List of studio albums, with selected chart positions, showing other details
Title	Album details	Peak chart positions
Title	Album details	US Country
Honey Come Back	Released: May 1970; Label: Columbia; Formats: LP	—
I'd Rather Be Sorry	Released: July 1971; Label: Mercury; Formats: LP	37
A Touch of Country	Released: 1979; Label: 51 West; Formats: LP, cassette	—
"—" denotes a recording that did not chart or was not released in that territory.

=== 1980s ===
List of studio albums, showing all relevant details
Title	Album details
Aces	Released: November 1981; Label: Plantation; Formats: LP, cassette
Golden Hits Volume 1 (Note: Golden Hits Volume 1 was not a compilation album, but rather a studio album of re-recordings.)	Released: December 1981; Label: Plantation; Formats: LP, cassette
Golden Hits Volume 2 (Note: Golden Hits Volume 2 was not a compilation album, but rather a studio album of re-recordings.)	Released: 1982; Label: Plantation; Formats: LP, cassette

=== 2000s ===
List of studio albums, showing all relevant details
Title	Album details
Brand New Tennessee Waltz	Released: January 16, 2001; Label: C.A.F./Gold; Formats: CD
Sweet Sounds of Christmas	Released: October 7, 2002; Label: DRG; Formats: CD
Best Country Songs	Released: November 25, 2008; Label: Curb; Formats: CD

== Compilation albums ==
=== 1950s ===
List of compilation albums, showing all relevant details
Title	Album details
Page 1 – A Collection of Her Most Famous Songs	Released: October 1955; Label: Mercury; Formats: LP
Page 2 – A Collection of Her Most Famous Songs	Released: October 1955; Label: Mercury; Formats: LP
Page 3 – A Collection of Her Most Famous Songs	Released: October 1955; Label: Mercury; Formats: LP
Page 4 – A Collection of Her Most Famous Songs	Released: February 1956; Label: Mercury; Formats: LP
This Is My Song	Released: February 1956; Label: Mercury; Formats: LP
The Waltz Queen (Note: Not to be confused with Page's studio album of the same name.)	Released: January 1958; Label: Wing; Formats: LP

=== 1960s ===
List of compilation albums, showing all relevant details
Title	Album details
Golden Hits	Released: March 1960; Label: Mercury; Formats: LP
Golden Hits – Volume II	Released: April 1963; Label: Mercury; Formats: LP
The Singing Rage	Released: May 1963; Label: Mercury; Formats: LP
Blue Dream Street	Released: July 1964; Label: Mercury; Formats: LP
The Nearness of You	Released: October 1964; Label: Mercury; Formats: LP
Y'all Come	Released: March 1965; Label: Wing; Formats: LP
Patti Page De Luxe	Released: 1966; Label: CBS; Formats: LP
My Name Is Patti	Released: April 1967; Label: CBS; Formats: LP
Love Letters	Released: January 1969; Label: Harmony; Formats: LP

=== 1970s ===
List of compilation albums, showing all relevant details
Title	Album details
Jazz Vocal Standards (with Billy Eckstine, Helen Merrill and Sarah Vaughan)	Released: 1970; Label: Mercury; Formats: LP
Stand by Your Man	Released: January 1970; Label: Harmony; Formats: LP
Green Green Grass of Home	Released: February 1971; Label: Harmony; Formats: LP
Jazz Vocal Custom 20 (with Billy Eckstine, Helen Merrill and Sarah Vaughan)	Released: 1972; Label: Mercury; Formats: LP
Sweet Voices (with Anita Bryant and Doris Day)	Released: 1973; Label: CBS/Sony; Formats: LP
Patti Page	Released: 1974; Label: CBS/Sony; Formats: LP
Reflection 18	Released: 1975; Label: Mercury; Formats: LP
New Gold Disc	Released: 1976; Label: CBS; Formats: LP
Golden Grand Prix 20	Released: 1977; Label: CBS; Formats: LP
Golden Grand Prix 30	Released: 1977; Label: CBS; Formats: LP
Country Greats	Released: 1977; Label: Mercury; Formats: LP
The Best of Patti Page: 20 All-Time Favourites	Released: 1978; Label: CBS; Formats: LP

=== 1980s ===
List of compilation albums, showing all relevant details
Title	Album details
20 All Time Greats	Released: 1981; Label: EMI; Formats: LP, cassette
20 Golden Favourites	Released: 1983; Label: Mercury; Formats: LP
20 Golden Hits	Released: 1983; Label: Plantation; Formats: Cassette
Sound Patio Collection: Patti Page	Released: March 5, 1989; Label: Mercury; Formats: CD
16 Most Requested Songs	Released: 1989; Label: Columbia; Formats: CD, cassette

=== 1990s ===
List of compilation albums, showing all relevant details
Title	Album details
Million Seller Hits	Released: 1990; Label: Mercury; Formats: CD
The Patti Page Collection: The Mercury Years Volume 1	Released: January 1991; Label: Mercury; Formats: CD
The Patti Page Collection: The Mercury Years Volume 2	Released: February 1991; Label: Mercury; Formats: CD
The Very Best of Patti Page	Released: 1992; Label: Columbia; Formats: CD
Greatest Songs	Released: 1995; Label: Curb; Formats: CD
Golden Greats	Released: April 8, 1998; Label: PolyGram; Formats: CD, cassette

=== 2000s ===
List of compilation albums, showing all relevant details
Title	Album details
20th Century Masters: The Millennium Collection	Released: March 4, 2003; Label: Mercury; Formats: CD
The Command Performance Collection	Released: July 27, 2004; Label: Varèse Sarabande; Formats: CD

== Live albums ==
List of live albums, showing all relevant details
Title	Album details
Patti Page on Stage	Released: January 1963; Label: Mercury; Formats: LP
Patti Page in Tokyo	Released: 1966; Label: CBS International; Formats: LP
Live at Carnegie Hall: The 50th Anniversary Concert	Released: September 15, 1998; Label: DRG; Formats: CD

== Video albums ==
List of video albums, showing all relevant details
Title	Album details
The Patti Page Video Songbook	Released: April 11, 1991; Label: Image Entertainment; Formats: VHS, LaserDisc
Patti Page Sings the Hits	Released: March 9, 2004; Label: Passport Audio; Formats: DVD
Moments to Remember	Released: 2011; Label: Treasury Collection; Formats: DVD

== Box sets ==
List of box sets, showing all relevant details
Title	Album details
A Golden Celebration	Released: June 3, 1997; Label: PolyGram/Mercury; Formats: CD

== Other album appearances ==
List of non-single guest appearances, with other performing artists, showing year released and album name
Title	Year	Other artist(s)	Album	Ref.
"My Yiddishe Momme"	1954	—	Sophie Tucker's Golden Jubilee	
"Gentle on My Mind"	1970	—	Army Spotlight	
"You Never Looked That Good When You Were Mine"	1986	George Jones	Wine Colored Roses	
"Precious Memories"	2003	George Jones	The Gospel Collection	
