= Tennessee Waltz (album) =

Studio album by Patti Page
- Released: 1952
- Genre: Traditional pop
- Label: Mercury

Patti Page chronology
Christmas with Patti Page (1951)	Tennessee Waltz (1952)	Patti Page Sings for Romance (1954)

Tennessee Waltz is the fourth studio album by Patti Page, issued by Mercury Records as a 10" long-playing record, as catalog number MG-25154.

== Track listing ==
Side 1
No.	Title	Length
1.	"The Tennessee Waltz"	3:02
2.	"Would I Love You (Love You, Love You)"	2:57
3.	"Mockin' Bird Hill"	3:01
4.	"And So to Sleep Again"	2:54

Side 2
No.	Title	Length
5.	"Mister and Mississippi"	3:12
6.	"Come What May"	2:09
7.	"These Things I Offer You (Bennie Benjamin / George David Weiss / Morty Nevins)"	2:18
8.	"Down the Trail of Achin' Hearts (Nat Simon / Jimmy Kennedy)"	2:57
