= Patti Page (album) =

Studio album by Patti Page
- Released: 1950
- Genre: Traditional pop
- Label: Mercury

Patti Page chronology
Patti Page (1950)	Folk Song Favorites (1951)

Patti Page is the first album by Patti Page, issued by Mercury Records in 1950 as a 10" long-playing record, as catalog number MG-25059.

== Track listing ==
Side 1
No.	Title	Writer(s)	Length
1.	"Confess"	Bennie Benjamin, George David Weiss	2:46
2.	"With My Eyes Wide Open, I'm Dreaming"	Mack Gordon, Harry Revel	3:09
3.	"That Old Feeling"	Sammy Fain, Lew Brown	3:05
4.	"Whispering"	John Schonberger, Malvin Schonberger	2:23

Side 2
No.	Title	Writer(s)	Length
5.	"All My Love"	Paul Durand, Mitchell Parish	3:13
6.	"So in Love"	Cole Porter	3:04
7.	"Oklahoma Blues"	Jack Rael	2:32
8.	"Roses Remind Me of You"	Benny Davis, Al Sherman, Joe Burke	2:34
