= Tennessee Waltz (disambiguation) =

"Tennessee Waltz" is a 1948 country song.

Tennessee Waltz may also refer to:

- Tennessee Waltz (album), a 1952 album by Patti Page
- Tennessee Waltz (film), a 1989 thriller film
- Operation Tennessee Waltz, a 2005 political scandal
