= Romance on the Range =

Romance on the Range may refer to:

- Romance on the Range (album), a 1955 album by Patti Page
- Romance on the Range (film), a movie starring Roy Rogers
