= And I Thought About You =

And I Thought About You may refer to:

- And I Thought About You (Patti Page album), 1955
- And I Thought About You (Johnny Hartman album), 1959
