= Dark Moon (song) =

1957 song by Bonnie Guitar

Single by Bonnie Guitar
- B-side: "Big Mike"
- Released: March 1957
- Genre: Country, rock and roll
- Length: 2:38
- Label: Fabor (local release), Dot (nationwide release)
- Songwriter: Ned Miller
- Producers: Fabor Robison, Randy Wood

Bonnie Guitar singles chronology
| "Dream on Dreamers" (1956) | "Dark Moon" (1957) | "Half Your Heart" (1957) |

"Dark Moon" is a song written by Ned Miller, which was popularized in several different musical formats after its composition. The more popular versions of the song were recorded by Bonnie Guitar and Gale Storm.

== Bonnie Guitar version ==
The original version of "Dark Moon" was recorded by American country music artist Bonnie Guitar in 1957. Guitar's producer, Fabor Robison, originally intended for rock and roll singer Dorsey Burnette to record the song, but was dissatisfied with the finished product. Instead, Guitar offered to record "Dark Moon", giving up her royalties to record the song, stating "I told him I’d give up my royalties to be able to record that song. I knew in my mind, as little as I knew, that that was a hit song. I just knew it. So, we went right in the studio and started working on it, and I played the lead guitar and everything." Ned Miller himself played the guitar in this recording.

The single version was leased on Dot Records and issued in March 1957. "Dark Moon" peaked at #14 on the Billboard Hot Country Singles chart and became a top 10 hit on the Billboard Hot 100, reaching #6. The single was Guitar's first major hit as a musical artist.

This version of the song was used in the credits to Season 1 Episode 3 of the Disney+ show Loki.

=== Chart performance ===
| Chart (1957) | Peak position |
|---|---|
| U.S. Billboard Hot Country Singles | 14 |
| U.S. Billboard Hot 100 | 6 |

== Gale Storm version ==
"Dark Moon"

Single by Gale Storm

from the album Gale Storm Hits
- B-side: "A Little Too Late"
- Released: March 1957
- Recorded: 1957
- Genre: Pop
- Length: 2:25
- Label: Dot
- Songwriter: Ned Miller
- Producer: Randy Wood

Gale Storm singles chronology
| "Lucky Lips" (1957) | "Dark Moon" (1957) | "On My Mind Again" (1957) |

The second version of "Dark Moon" was recorded by American pop artist Gale Storm, with orchestra and chorus directed by Billy Vaughn. At the release of Bonnie Guitar's original version of "Dark Moon", Storm was recording for Dot Records as well. Storm's manager insisted that she record the song. Gale Storm's version was released shortly after the original version's release in 1957. The single peaked at #4 on the Billboard Hot 100 in late 1957. The song became Storm's last chart record in Billboard Magazine.

Shortly after Storm's success, British pop artist Tony Brent covered the song. An official single version was released in 1957 and reached #17 on the UK Singles Chart in June 1957.

=== Chart performance ===
| Chart (1957) | Peak position |
|---|---|
| U.S. Billboard Hot 100 | 4 |

== Other recordings ==
- Bing Crosby recorded the song in 1957 for use on his radio show and it was subsequently included in the album Shall We Dance?(2012)
- Frank Ifield - included in his album Blue Skies (1964)
- Patti Page - as a B-side for her country single "Broken Heart and a Pillow Full of Tears"; she also included in her album Patti Page Sings Country and Western Golden Hits (1961)
- Chris Isaak - from the soundtrack of the film A Perfect World (1993)
- Elvis Presley - included in the (compilation) album The Home Recordings (1999). The song, a home recording, was recorded in 1966.
- Anna Wilson - included on her album Just For You (2007)
- Jim Reeves - Included on his 1959 album “The Intimate Jim Reeves”
