= Moon Over Miami =

Moon Over Miami may refer to:

- Moon Over Miami (film), 1941 musical
- Moon Over Miami (TV series), 1993 drama/crime series
- Moon Over Miami (song), 1935 song by Joe Burke and Edgar Leslie
- Moon Over Miami (script), a film script written to portray the Abscam Operation
- Moons over My Hammy, breakfast item from Denny's restaurant
- Moon Over Miami (play), a 1989 John Guare play
