= Billie Anthony =

Scottish singer (1932–1991)

- Born: Philomena McGeachie Levy; 11 October 1932; Glasgow, Scotland
- Died: 5 January 1991 (aged 58) London, England
- Genres: Traditional pop

Billie Anthony (born Philomena McGeachie Levy; 11 October 1932 – 5 January 1991) was a Scottish female singer. She is best known for her Top 10 hit version of "This Ole House", which despite chart competition from other versions of the same song, reached No. 4 in the UK chart.

== Early life ==
Born Philomena McGeachie Levy in Glasgow, Scotland, her mother, Lily, was a talented dancer, whilst her father was a song and dance man, and stage manager at the Glasgow Empire. Levy's godmother was Gracie Fields. Although her parents divorced when she was eighteen days old, she spent her entire childhood in and around the theatre, and wanted a career on the stage as a dancer. Initially, her mother was against her going into show business, so upon leaving school, she reluctantly agreed to train as a dressmaker. However, her affinity with the theatre proved too powerful.

In 1946, when still only fourteen, she ran away from home and joined the chorus of a touring show as one of "May Moxon's Young Ladies". Five years later she met Peter Elliott, who was part of a famous show business family called The Musical Elliotts. They developed an instant friendship and, due to their mutual love of dancing, decided on the formation of their own double act. As Phil and Peter Elliott, they successfully toured variety theatres as "The Debonair Dancers – Four Educated Feet". They toured continuously throughout 1952 but, in 1953, were compelled to abandon their act when Peter was called up to do his national service with the Royal Air Force.

== Singing career ==
During their time on the variety circuit, Elliott and Levy had met and become friends with singer Tony Brent, who had several hit records to his name. It was Brent who first recognised Levy's vocal potential and, acting on his advice, she decided to go solo in an effort to try to make a living as a singer while Elliott was away. Brent introduced her to his own manager, Don Agness, and he arranged for her to do a trial recording. Then, in October 1953, after months of voice training and with her name changed to Billie Anthony, she recorded and released her first single for Columbia Records called "I'd Rather Take My Time" coupled with "Things Go Wrong". However, it failed to make any impression.

On 20 February 1954, Anthony and Elliott got married. However, the marriage did not last, as they realised that their lives were no longer going in the same direction. By the time Elliott had completed his service in the RAF, Anthony had attained quite a high level of popularity as a vocalist, and Elliott decided that he wanted to explore other possibilities. Thus, they went their separate ways, and eventually divorced in the early 1960s.

January 1954 saw the release of her second record, "Ricochet", followed in March by, "Bell Bottom Blues", both of which did well for Alma Cogan, Teresa Brewer and Joan Regan. Both sides of her next release "Cross Over The Bridge" and "I Get So Lonely" were recorded in April as duets with Tony Brent.

Her sixth record release in October finally made the charts. The song was "This Ole House". Several other singers recorded the same song, including Alma Cogan and Joan Regan, but it was Rosemary Clooney who jockeyed with Anthony for the highest chart position. Clooney, in the charts for eighteen weeks, finally won the battle for the coveted number one spot both in the UK and America. Anthony reached No. 4 in the UK and remained in the UK Singles Chart for sixteen weeks.

With the success of "This Ole House", she became known as "Britain's Blonde Bombshell". However, despite Anthony's good looks and voice, no other record of hers ever made the UK chart, leaving her with the unfortunate one hit wonder tag. Her two follow up discs, "Teach Me Tonight" and "No More", went almost unnoticed.

In January 1955, Stuart Hamblin, the American country and western singer-songwriter and composer of "This Ole House", came to London and, because he was so impressed with Anthony's version of his song, met her and presented her with the choice of another number from the material he had not yet published. She chose "Shake The Hand of a Stranger", a song that many people consider to be the best of her career. Recorded and released in April, it failed to take off. Every song she recorded after that seemed to eclipse the preceding one but, although they sold in sizeable numbers, songs such as "Boom Boom Boomerang", "Ten Little Kisses" and "The Old Pianna Rag" did not take Anthony back to the charts.

During 1955, she toured relentlessly around the UK, and while appearing in a jazz concert at London's Royal Albert Hall, she was visited in her dressing room by Gene Kelly, who had been in the audience. He discussed ideas regarding a part for her in a musical film, but this proved to be without foundation, and a movie part was never offered.

1955 to 1957 were Anthony's busiest years. Due to ever increasing demand, her fan club was formed, and besides touring she made regular radio and television appearances, not only in Britain but also on the continent. The greater part of 1957 was spent on the road with Harry Secombe in the variety show Rocking The Town. Anthony spent a hectic eight weeks in the early part of 1958, entertaining the forces in Cyprus, Malta and North Africa. After returning to London, she spent the remainder of the year touring in variety, doing one-night stands and the occasional service camp dates. This similar routine of one-night stands continued throughout 1959, interrupted only by a summer season at the Great Yarmouth's Regal Theatre with Hughie Green's Double Your Money show.

By 1960, her recording career, which had been slowly declining, ground to a halt after six and a half years. "A Handful of Gold", coupled with "Sure Fire Love", released in January 1960, were Anthony's last offerings on record. She was quoted as saying, "I'll let the rock 'n' roll boys come and go and then I'll be back".

== Later years ==
Anthony eventually withdrew from show business, and with the birth of her daughter Jessica in 1968, she decided to concentrate on full-time motherhood. From then on she chose to live quietly in Hornsey, north London.

In early 1991, Anthony lost consciousness after suffering a series of strokes and never recovered. She died in London's Whittington Hospital, Archway, on 5 January 1991, at the age of 58.
