= Blue Skies (Frank Ifield album) =

Studio album by Frank Ifield
- Released: 1964
- Genre: Pop
- Label: Columbia & World Record Club

Frank Ifield chronology
Born Free (1963)	Blue Skies (1964)	Greatest Hits (1964)

Professional ratings
Review scores
Source	Rating
Record Mirror	5/5 stars

Blue Skies is the third album by Australian (English born) singer Frank Ifield released in 1964 on the Columbia label. Blue Skies reached No. 10 in the UK Albums Chart. It was also the first Frank Ifield album released by the World Record Club.

== Track listing ==
Side One

1. "Blue Skies"† (Irving Berlin)
2. "Dark Moon" (Ned Miller)
3. "You Came a Long Way from St. Louis"† (Bob Russell/John Benson Brooks)
4. "Tumbling Tumbleweeds" (Bob Nolan)
5. "Let Me Be the One" (Frank Ifield)
6. "I'll Be Around" (Alec Wilder)

Side Two

1. "My Blue Heaven" (Walter Donaldson/George Whiting)
2. "Sweet Lorraine"† (Mitchell Parish/Cliff Burwell)
3. "I'm Sorry" (Buck Ram/Peter Tinturin/William W. White)
4. "Who Cares (For Me)" (Don Gibson)
5. "Make It Soon" (Maurice Pon/Henri Salvador/William Engvick)
6. "I've Got You Under My Skin" (Cole Porter)

== Production ==
- Accompaniment directed by Norrie Paramor and †Johnny Hawkins.
