= Left Right Out of Your Heart =

"Left Right Out Of Your Heart (Hi Lee Hi Lo Hi Lup Up Up)"

Single by Patti Page
- B-side: "Longing To Hold You Again"
- Released: June 20, 1958
- Genre: Traditional pop
- Length: 2:20
- Label: Mercury
- Composer: Mort Garson
- Lyricist: Earl Shuman

Patti Page singles chronology
"Another Time, Another Place" (1958)	"Left Right Out Of Your Heart (Hi Lee Hi Lo Hi Lup Up Up)" (1958)	"Fibbin'" (1958)

"Left Right Out Of Your Heart" is a pop song written by Mort Garson, with lyrics by Earl Shuman. The best-known version was recorded by Patti Page in 1958. This recording was released by Mercury Records as catalog number 71331. It first reached the Billboard magazine charts on June 30, 1958. On the Disk Jockey chart, it peaked at # 9; on the Best Seller chart, at # 14; on the "Hot 100" composite chart of the top 100 songs, it reached # 13. "Left Right Out of Your Heart" was Page's final Top Ten entry and certified Gold million seller until "Hush, Hush, Sweet Charlotte" became Page's last Top Ten hit and Gold million seller in 1965.

"Left Right Out of Your Heart" was a #6 hit in Australia for Page.
