= Moon over Miami (song) =

The popular song "Moon Over Miami" was written in 1935 by songwriters Joe Burke and Edgar Leslie. The music was used in the 1941 film Moon Over Miami, being played during the opening credits and also played as dance music at both parties.

== Early hits ==
Joel Whitburn assessed the most popular as being:
The version by Eddy Duchin and his Orchestra (released by Victor Records as catalog number 25212B).
Jan Garber & His Orchestra (released by Decca Records as catalog number 651B).
Chick Bullock with Art Karle & His Boys (Vocalion 3146).
Connee Boswell (released by Decca Records as catalogue number 657A).

Others early versions were by:
Al Collins Band of London, UK recorded "Moon over Miami" on January 31, 1936 for Decca Records (GB-7658-1).
Roy Smeck & His Orchestra (released by Decca Records as catalog number 649)
Lud Gluskin's Orchestra with vocal by a young Buddy Clark (released by Brunswick Records as catalog number 7590),
Henry Hall and the BBC Dance Orchestra.

== Later cover versions ==
- 1945 by Vaughn Monroe (released by RCA Victor Records as catalog num. 20-1707).
- 1950 George Shearing Quintet recorded for the album George Shearing Quintet.
- 1953 Patti Page included the song in her album Patti Page Sings for Romance.
- 1956 Ralph Flanagan and His Orchestra for the album 1001 Nighters.
- On 3 April 1957, Bill Haley & His Comets recorded a rock and roll version at the Pythian Temple, New York City. It was released by Decca Records as catalog number 102151 and included in the album Rockin' the Oldies.
- 1960 Ray Charles recorded it for his album The Genius Hits the Road.
- 1963 The Platters for their album The Plattters Sing of Your Moonlight Memories.
- 1963 Percy Faith included it in his album American Serenade.
- 1975 Bert Kaempfert included it in his album Moon Over Miami.
- 2018 Sergey Neiss for Fallout: Miami mod.
