= The Voices of Patti Page =

Studio album by Patti Page
- Released: 1956
- Genre: Traditional pop
- Label: Mercury

Patti Page chronology
You Go to My Head (1956)	The Voices of Patti Page (1956)	The East Side (1957)

The Voices Of Patti Page is a Patti Page LP album, issued by Mercury Records as catalog number MG-20100.

Billboard reviewed the album on July 7, 1956 saying: “Outstanding feature of this recap of a dozen of the thrush’s singles is amazingly accurate reproduction of Patti Page’s multi-voice technique. The waxing is a beautiful piece of work from start to finish, and including, as it does, “Doggie in the Window” (her old smash hit single), “Milwaukee Polka,” “Changing Partners” and “Crazy Quilt,” a sound item for counter inventory. Thrush's current national TV spot on CBS should also help sales.”

Track listing for The Voices of Patti Page
Track number	Title	Songwriter(s)	Length
A1	The Doggie in the Window	Bob Merrill	2:26
A2	Butterflies	Bob Merrill	2:51
A3	Hocus Pocus	David Saxon / Norman Gimbel	2:18
A4	I Cried	Billy Duke / Michael Elias	2:46
A5	I Can't Tell a Waltz from a Tango	Al Hoffman / Dick Manning	2:24
A6	Milwaukee Polka	Nat Simon / Charles Tobias	2:37
B1	Changing Partners	Larry Coleman / Joe Darion	2:57
B2	What a Dream	Chuck Willis	2:53
B3	I Love to Dance with You	Billy Fadden / Don Raye	2:47
B4	Everlovin' (A One Way Love)	Joe Sherman / Noel Sherman	2:15
B5	Little Crazy Quilt	Leon Carr / Hal David	2:44
B6	Keep Me in Mind	Burt Bacharach / Jack Wolf	2:21
