= Dick Charles =

American songwriter

Dick Charles (born Richard Charles Krieg; February 24, 1919 in Newark, New Jersey – July 17, 1998) was an American songwriter.

== Career ==
His education ended with high school graduation, after which he worked in a Newark photography store as a clerk while engaged in piano playing, arranging, harmony, and composition. During that period he sang in a number of amateur contests. He then became a page at NBC Studios in New York City. Besides being a songwriter, he served as a director of ABC Radio for ten years, produced and directed the Paul Whiteman radio program, and was responsible for creating a number of network programs. In 1954 he started his own recording service – Dick Charles Recording Service Inc.

== Selected works ==
Among the songs he has written are:

- "As the World Turns" (1961) with Fay Tishman - used for one season as the theme song for the TV show As the World Turns
- "Along the Navajo Trail" (1945) with Larry Markes and Edgar De Lange
- "Casanova Cricket " (1947) with Hoagy Carmichael and Larry Markes
- "Corns For My Country" (1944) with Leah Worth and Jean Barry
- "I'm on the Level With You " (1945) with Eddie Waldman
- "I Tipped My Hat and Slowly Walked Away" (1946) with Larry Markes
- "It Takes a Long, Long Train (With a Red Caboose" (1946) with Larry Markes
- "Mad About Him, Sad About Him, How Can I Be Glad About Him Blues" (1942) with Larry Markes
- "The Man on the Carousel" (Unknown year) with James Cavanaugh, Jack Allison and Virgil Davis
- "May You Always" (1957) with Larry Markes
- "A Nightingale Can Sing the Blues" (1946) with Larry Markes
- "This Is My Song" (1950) - Theme song of the TV show The Patti Page Show
- "Serenade to Spring," with Gloria Regney (1954)
- "If Anything Should Happen to You," w&m co-written with Fred Ebb (1955); OCLC 498329339
