= So Many Memories =

Studio album by Patti Page
- Released: 1954
- Recorded: August / October 1953
- Studios: Fine Sound Studio, New York City
- Genre: Traditional pop
- Label: Mercury

Patti Page chronology
Patti's Songs (1954)	So Many Memories (1954)	And I Thought About You (1955)

So Many Memories is a 1954 Patti Page album, issued by Mercury Records as a 10" long-playing record, as catalog number MG-25210. Musical accompaniment by Jack Rael's Orchestra.

== Track listing ==
Track number	Title	Songwriter(s)
A1	"Deep in a Dream"	Jimmy Van Heusen / Eddie DeLange
A2	"Spring Is Here"	Richard Rodgers / Lorenz Hart
A3	"You Go to My Head"	J. Fred Coots / Haven Gillespie
A4	"I Hadn't Anyone Till You"	Ray Noble
B1	"Darn That Dream "	Jimmy Van Heusen / Eddie DeLange
B2	"I Didn't Know What Time It Was"	Richard Rodgers / Lorenz Hart
B3	"What's New?"	Bob Haggart / Johnny Burke
B4	"I'll Never Smile Again"	Ruth Lowe
