= Another Time, Another Place (1958 song) =

Single by Patti Page
- B-side: "These Worldly Wonders"
- Released: April 10, 1958
- Genre: Pop
- Length: 2:25
- Label: Mercury
- Songwriters: Jay Livingston; Ray Evans

Patti Page singles chronology
"Belonging to Someone" (1957)	"Another Time, Another Place" (1958)	"Left Right Out of Your Heart" (1958)

"Another Time, Another Place" is a pop song published in 1958. The music was written by Jay Livingston, the lyrics by Ray Evans.

== Background and chart performance ==
It was featured in the movie of the same name. It was popularized by Patti Page in 1958. The Page recording was released by Mercury Records as catalog number 71294. It first reached the Billboard magazine charts on May 5, 1958. On the Disk Jockey chart, it peaked at number 20, on the composite chart of the top 100 songs, it reached number 81.
