= Just Patti =

Studio album by Patti Page
- Released: 1954
- Recorded: November, 1953
- Studio: Fine Sound Studio, New York City
- Genre: Traditional pop
- Label: Mercury

Patti Page chronology
Patti Page Song Souvenir (1954)	Just Patti (1954)	Patti's Songs (1954)

Just Patti was a Patti Page LP album, issued by Mercury Records as catalog number MG-25196 in 1954. Musical accompaniment was provided by Jack Rael's Orchestra.

== Track listing ==
Track number	Title	Songwriter(s)
A1	"Everything I Have Is Yours"	Burton Lane / Harold Adamson
A2	"Don't Blame Me"	Jimmy McHugh / Dorothy Fields
A3	"A Ghost of a Chance"	Victor Young / Ned Washington / Bing Crosby
A4	"We Just Couldn't Say Goodbye"	Harry M. Woods
B1	"I'm Getting Sentimental Over You "	George Bassman / Ned Washington
B2	"Try a Little Tenderness"	Harry M. Woods / Jimmy Campbell and Reg Connelly
B3	"Under a Blanket of Blue"	Jerry Livingston / Marty Symes / Al J. Neiburg
B4	"Sweet and Lovely"	Gus Arnheim / Harry Tobias / Jules Lemare
