= Broken Heart and a Pillow Full of Tears =

Single by Patti Page
- B-side: "Dark Moon"
- Released: September 1961
- Genre: Country-pop
- Length: 2:00
- Label: Mercury; 71870
- Songwriter: Paul Anka

Patti Page singles chronology
"Mom and Dad's Waltz" (1961)	"Broken Heart and a Pillow Full of Tears" (1961)	"Go on Home" (1962)

"Broken Heart and a Pillow Full of Tears" is a song written by popular singer-songwriter Paul Anka and most notably recorded by Patti Page and the Mike Stewart Singers, whose Mercury Records released it as a single in late 1961. It made brief chart appearances in the US and Canada.

== Patti Page version ==
=== Background and release ===
Patti Page first broke out as a singer in 1948 with a hit with Mercury Records. She continued recording for the label for nearly 20 years. She had several chart-topping hits in the 1950s, but her success waned by the dawn of the 1960s. Page's singles did not enter the top-40 of the charts anymore. Following "Mom and Dad's Waltz" which was her best performing record since 1958, Mercury scheduled to release "Broken Heart and a Pillow Full of Tears" for September 1961. It was backed by a country ballad and previous hit for Bonnie Guitar, "Dark Moon" on the B-side written by Ned Miller, which was lifted from her Patti Page Sings Country and Western Golden Hits LP. Ray Ellis conducted and arranged the chorus and orchestra on side one, while "Dark Moon" was arranged by Cliff Parman.

=== Critical reception ===
Professional ratings
Review scores
Source	Rating
Billboard	Favorable (Spotlight Single)
Cashbox	Favorable (Pick of the Week)

The single was met with a positive critical reception upon its release. Billboard magazine said that "Miss Page sounds fine here on a breezy country-ish tune written for her by Paul Anka." They believed that it's one "of her better recent sides and it has a good chance to move out." Cashbox reviewed the single in mid September and wrote that "Patti looks like she’s headed towards hitsville with this one," saying: "it’s a brisk-paced, country-flavored affair [...] that the lark and the Mike Stewart Singers knock out in coin-catching manner." The also noted that there's "Sock support from the Ray Ellis instrumentalists."

=== Chart performance ===
"Broken Heart and a Pillow Full of Tears" was another single by Page that reached the pop charts, but did not restore momentum to her career. It debuted on the Billboard Hot 100 on October 2, 1961, reaching No. 91 during a four-week run on it. The track entered the Canadian CHUM Singles Chart and quickly reached No. 30, earning her another Canadian top-40 record, while she did not have a top-20 on American charts until 1965.

=== Track listing ===
7" single (Mercury 71870, 1961)
No.	Title	Writer(s)	Performance rights handled by	Length
1.	"Broken Heart and a Pillow Full of Tears"	Paul Anka	Broadcast Music, Inc.	2:00
2.	"Dark Moon"	Ned Miller	Broadcast Music, Inc.	2:34

=== Personnel ===
All credits are adapted from the liner notes of "Broken Heart and a Pillow Full of Tears".

- Patti Page – vocals
- The Mike Stewart Singers – vocals
- Ray Ellis, (tracks: A1) – arranger, conductor
- Cliff Parman, (tracks: B1) – arranger, conductor

== Charts ==
Chart performance for "Broken Heart and a Pillow Full of Tears"
Chart (1961)	Peak position
US Billboard Hot 100	91
Canada CHUM Singles Chart	30
