= Come What May (1952 song) =

Song written by Vaughn Horton

"Come What May" (aka "The Gipsy Song") is a popular song, written by Vaughn Horton in 1951. It was popularized by Patti Page in 1952.

The Page recording, in an arrangement by Joe Reisman, was issued by Mercury Records as catalog number 5772 (backed with "Retreat"), and first reached the Billboard chart on February 9, 1952, lasting 13 weeks and peaking at number 9.

== Cover versions ==
- Tony Brent with Orchestra directed by Norrie Paramor - Columbia Records, October 1952
- Helen O'Connell - a recording for Capitol Records (catalog No. 1944).
- Tommy Dorsey & His Orchestra (vocal by Buddy Stark) - a single release for Decca Records in 1952.
- Jimmy Scott - recorded for Coral Records (catalog No. 60650).
- Lita Roza - covered the song in the UK.
