= Patti Page Sings for Romance =

- Patti Page Sings for Romance Early 10" LP

Studio album by Patti Page
- Released: October 1954
- Recorded: June 9, 1953 / July 13, 1953
- Studio: Fine Sound Studio, New York City
- Genre: Traditional pop, country
- Label: Mercury

Patti Page chronology
Christmas with Patti Page (1951)	Patti Page Sings for Romance (1954)	Patti Page Song Souvenir (1954)

Patti Page Sings for Romance is a 1954 Patti Page LP issued by Mercury Records as catalog number MG-25185. It was released as an EP with four songs, as well.

Billboard reviewed the album on October 30, 1954 saying, inter alia,:

“Patti Page Sings for Romance – Patti Page Song Souvenir – Mercury 25185, 25187
... Both of these new LPs should appeal to her large teen-age following and to the older crowd as well. For both sets contain tunes of the 1934-’37 period, and Patti sings them all with warmth, feeling and style for which she has become known…Dealers should be able to move many of these sets between now and Christmas.”

== Track listing ==
No.	Title	Length
1.	"East of the Sun (and West of the Moon) - (Brooks Bowman)"
2.	"I Only Have Eyes for You - (Harry Warren, Al Dubin)"
3.	"Everyday - (Pinetop Sparks, Milton Sparks)"
4.	"There Is No Greater Love - (Isham Jones, Marty Symes)"
5.	"Did I Remember? - (Walter Donaldson, Harold Adamson)"
6.	"Blue Hawaii - (Leo Robin, Ralph Rainger)"
7.	"Where or When - (Richard Rodgers, Lorenz Hart)"
8.	"Moon Over Miami - (Joe Burke, Edgar Leslie)"
