= This Is My Song (1951 song) =

"This Is My Song" is a popular song composed by Dick Charles, a pseudonym of Richard Charles Krieg, on August 23, 1950. It was published on December 31, 1951.

It was recorded by Patti Page in 1953, and issued by Mercury Records as catalog number 70183. The song entered the Billboard chart on August 8, 1953, at number 20, lasting one week. The song also became Patti Page's television theme song.
