= Leon Carr =

- Born: June 10, 1910; Allentown, Pennsylvania, U.S.
- Died: March 27, 1976 (aged 65) New York City, U.S.
- Genre: Classical
- Occupations: Songwriter; composer; arranger; pianist; conductor

Leon Carr (June 10, 1910 – March 27, 1976) was an American songwriter, composer, arranger, pianist, and conductor. He developed several famed marketing jingles used in advertisements, including "Sometimes You Feel Like a Nut..." for Mounds candy, "See the USA in Your Chevrolet" for Chevrolet, and the "Bert the Turtle" theme song for the 1952 nuclear public education awareness film Duck and Cover.

== Early life and education ==
Carr was born in Allentown, Pennsylvania, on June 10, 1910. Carr was educated at Pennsylvania State University. He also studied the Schillinger System at New York University in New York City.

== Career ==
Carr moved to New York City in 1935. His marketing jingles are among the best known in the history of broadcast advertising. His biggest non-jingle hit was "There's No Tomorrow", a parody of "O Sole Mio", which was popularized by Tony Martin in the film Two Tickets to Broadway; it spent 27 weeks on the Billboard charts in 1949, peaking at #2.

Carr's other popular song compositions include "Bell Bottom Blues", "Hotel Happiness", "Herthquake", "Hey There Lonely Girl", "Your Socks Don't Match", "A Man Could Be a Wonderful Thing", "Goblins in the Steeple", "Big Name Button", "If You Smile at the Sun", "I'd Do It All Again", "Skiddle-Diddle-Dee", "Should I Wait?", "Our Everlasting Love", "Another Cup of Coffee", "Most People Get Married", "Clinging Vine", "Marriage Is for Old Folks", "The Secret Life", and "Confidence".

Artists who have recorded Carr's popular music include Brook Benton, Teresa Brewer, Vikki Carr, Vic Damone, Roy Hamilton, Tom Jones, Dean Martin, Tony Martin, Johnny Mathis, Guy Mitchell, Patti Page, Gene Pitney, Louis Prima, Buddy Rich, Nina Simone, Mel Tormé, Bobby Vinton, and Anita Baker. In 1938, Jimmie Lunceford's orchestra recorded Carr's instrumental composition "Frisco Fog", which prefigured Duke Ellington's celebrated 1940 "Ko-Ko".

Carr also composed the off-Broadway musical The Secret Life of Walter Mitty based on the short story of the same name by James Thurber, which opened at The Players Theatre in Greenwich Village on October 26, 1964, and ran for 96 performances.

== Death ==
Carr died in New York City on March 27, 1976, at age 65. He was survived by his wife, Shirley, a son, Stephen, and a grandson.
