= Croce di Oro =

"Croce di Oro" ("Cross of Gold")" is a popular song, written by James "Kim" Gannon.

It was popularized by Patti Page in 1955.

The Page recording was released by Mercury Records as catalog number 70713. It first reached the Billboard charts on November 12, 1955. On the Disk Jockey chart, it peaked at number 17; on the Best Seller chart, at number 20; on the Juke Box chart, at number 16; and number 16 on the composite chart of the top 100 songs. Page later re-recorded the song and it was included in her album Hush, Hush, Sweet Charlotte (1965).

A United Kingdom version, recorded by Joan Regan, was also issued in the United States by London Records as catalog number 1605.

On Cash Box magazine's charts, the song (in all versions combined) reached a peak position of number 15.
