= Boys' Night Out (song) =

"The Boys' Night Out"

Single by Patti Page
- B-side: "Three Fools"
- Released: 1962
- Genre: Pop
- Length: 1:50
- Label: Mercury
- Songwriters: Jimmy Van Heusen; Sammy Cahn

"Boys' Night Out" is a popular 1962 song by Jimmy Van Heusen (music) and Sammy Cahn (words). It is the title song from the 1962 film of the same name. It was recorded by Patti Page, who also sang it in the movie, and reached #49 on the Billboard Hot 100 chart in 1962. In the same year the song was covered by Frank Sinatra.

== Samples and references by later artists ==
A snippet of the Sinatra version was sampled on "Hit 'Em Up Style (Oops!)" by Blu Cantrell.

== Copyright ==
"Boys Night Out" (score)
Jimmy Van Heusen (music)
Sammy Cahn (words)
©13 March 1962 EU710563
Maraville Music Corp. (Los Angeles)
OCLC 221765870
