= Patti's Songs =

Studio album by Patti Page
- Released: 1954
- Recorded: December 1953
- Studios: Fine Sound Studio, New York City
- Genre: Traditional pop
- Label: Mercury

Patti Page chronology
Just Patti (1954)	Patti's Songs (1954)	So Many Memories (1954)

Patti's Songs was a Patti Page album, issued by Mercury Records as a 10" long-playing record, as catalog number MG-25197. Musical accompanment by Jack Rael's Orchestra.

== Track listing ==
Track number	Title	Songwriter(s)
A1	"You're Driving Me Crazy"	Walter Donaldson
A2	"Penthouse Serenade"	Will Jason / Val Burton
A3	"Rockin' Chair"	Hoagy Carmichael
A4	"Just One More Chance"	Arthur Johnston / Sam Coslow
B1	"Paradise"	Nacio Herb Brown / Gordon Clifford
B2	"My Ideal"	Richard A. Whiting / Leo Robin / Newell Chase
B3	"I Still Get a Thrill"	Benny Davis / J. Fred Coots
B4	"I'll Never Be the Same"	Matty Malneck / Frank Signorelli / Gus Kahn
