= Folk Song Favorites =

Studio album by Patti Page
- Released: 1951
- Recorded: April – June 1951
- Genre: Folk
- Label: Mercury
- Producer: Jack Rael

Patti Page chronology
Patti Page (1950)	Folk Song Favorites (1951)	Christmas with Patti Page (1951)

Professional ratings
Review scores
Source	Rating
Allmusic	4/5 stars

Folk Song Favorites is an album by American singer Patti Page. It was released as a 10" long-playing record by Mercury Records, as catalog number MG-25101. Orchestral accompaniment was directed by Jack Rael.

The album was reissued with 4 additional songs in 1955 as Romance on the Range.

== Track listing ==
Track number	Title	Songwriter(s)
A1	"Down in the Valley"	Traditional
A2	"Leanin' on the Old Top Rail"	Charles & Nick Kenny
A3	"Tumbling Tumbleweeds"	Bob Nolan
A4	"I Want to Be a Cowboy's Sweetheart"	Patsy Montana
B1	"Detour"	Paul Westmoreland
B2	"The Prisoner's Song"	Guy Massey
B3	"Who's Gonna Shoe My Pretty Little Feet?"	Clara Ann Fowler / Jack Rael
B4	"San Antonio Rose”	Bob Wills
