= Say Something Sweet =

"Say Something Sweet to Your Sweetheart"

Song
- Published: 1948
- Genre: Traditional pop
- Composers: Sid Tepper, Roy C. Bennett

"Say Something Sweet to Your Sweetheart" is a popular song, written by Sid Tepper and Roy C. Bennett (aka Roy Brodsky).

Chart recordings in 1948 were by Jo Stafford & Gordon MacRae (No. 10 in the Billboard chart), The Ink Spots (No. 22) and Patti Page with Vic Damone (No. 23).

The Page recording was issued by Mercury Records as catalog number 5192, and first reached the Billboard chart on November 20, 1948, lasting 4 weeks and peaking at #23.

Several other artists also recorded the song.
