= Most People Get Married =

"Most People Get Married" is a popular song, published in 1962. The song's music was written by Leon Carr, the lyrics by Earl Shuman.

== Patti Page recording ==
- A version by Patti Page charted in 1962, reaching No. 27 on the Billboard chart. The presence of Patti Page brought the rockabilly-tinged song to the easy listening survey, where it peaked at No. 8.

== Cover versions ==
- In 1962, the song was also recorded by Joan Regan in the United Kingdom. This recording featured an accompaniment directed by Peter Knight with the Babs Knight Singers.
- In 1977, Jeannie C. Riley included a cover on her, Jeannie C. Riley, Fancy Friends, From Nashville With Love, LP.
