= The Wall (1957 song) =

Song by Patti Page with Vic Schoen and His Orchestra
- A-side: "A Poor Man's Roses (Or A Rich Man's Gold)"
- Released: 1957
- Genre: Pop
- Label: Mercury
- Songwriters: Oramay Diamond; Clyde Otis; Dave Dreyer

"The Wall" is a popular song, written by Oramay Diamond, Clyde Otis, and Dave Dreyer.

It was most popularized by Patti Page in 1957. The Page recording was issued by Mercury Records as catalog number 71059, (the flip side of "A Poor Man's Roses (or a Rich Man's Gold)") and first reached the Billboard chart on March 6, 1957, lasting six weeks and peaking at No. 43.

Other 1957 recordings were made by Eileen Rodgers as Columbia Records catalog number 40850 (which peaked at No. 64), and by Brook Benton as Epic Records 9199.

Shirley Bassey recorded the track at this time whilst in New York City. It was issued in 1959 on the album The Bewitching Miss Bassey. The song can be found on a CD compilation album called Easy To Love issued by Motif Records in 2010, which features the later Bassey recordings for the Philips Records label.

On the Cash Box Best-Selling Records chart, where multiple versions of a song were always combined, the song lasted five weeks and peaked at No. 42.
