= I'll Keep the Lovelight Burning =

"I'll Keep the Lovelight Burning (In My Heart)" is a popular song written by Bennie Benjamin and George David Weiss, popularized by Patti Page in 1949. Louis Armstrong also covered the song in 1949.

This should not be confused with the song with a similar title written in 1942 by Harry Tobias, Nick Kenny, and Harold Levey.

The Page recording was issued by Mercury Records as catalog number 5310, and first reached the Billboard chart on September 4, 1949, lasting 8 weeks and peaking at #26.
