= I Went to Your Wedding =

Single by Patti Page with Jack Rael and his Orchestra

from the album Page 4
- B-side: "You Belong to Me"
- Published: June 16, 1952 by St. Louis Music Corp.
- Released: September 13, 1952
- Recorded: August 16, 1952
- Genre: Popular music
- Length: 3:13
- Label: Mercury 5899
- Songwriter: Jessie Mae Robinson
- Producer: Jack Rael

Patti Page with Jack Rael and his Orchestra singles chronology
| "Release Me" (1952) | "I Went to Your Wedding" (1952) | "Why Don't You Believe Me" (1952) |

"I Went to Your Wedding" is a popular song written and composed by Jessie Mae Robinson and published in 1952.

== Background ==
The song's melody is similar to the old Russian song "Po Donu gulyaet kazak molodoi" ("Young Cossack went near the Don"). The song is a report of a wedding, attended by the ex-lover of one of the parties being married, who obviously is still in love with the person to whom it is addressed. While the lines "You came down the aisle/ Wearing a smile/ A vision of loveliness" might suggest the song being directed to a female, the best-known versions of the song have been sung by female singers, presumably to male ex-lovers.

== Patti Page recording ==
The biggest hit version was recorded by Patti Page. It was recorded on August 6, 1952, and issued by Mercury Records as catalog number 5899, with the flip side "You Belong to Me." It first entered the Billboard chart on August 22, 1952, lasting 21 weeks and reaching number 1 on the chart. "I Went to Your Wedding" also afforded Page a number 1 hit in Australia.

== Cover versions ==
- Another version was recorded by the Sammy Kaye orchestra, on August 15, 1952, and issued by Columbia Records as catalog number 39856.
- The song was also recorded by Alma Cogan in the United Kingdom in 1952.
- A country music version by Hank Snow peaked at number 3 on the Billboard Hot Country Singles chart in 1952.
- The French rendering of "I Went To Your Wedding," re-titled "Ton mariage," was recorded in 1953 by Lys Assia; Line Renaud and Tino Rossi also recorded versions.
- Philippine singer Victor Wood performed and released a bilingual version of "I Went To Your Wedding" in which he alternated the original lyrics with Filipino ones.
- There's a cover version on Damita Jo Sing A Country Song, a Mercury Records album from 1962

== In popular culture ==
- The song was parodied by Spike Jones and his City Slickers in December 1952, depicting the singer as glad to "get rid" of the bride. Ray Stevens covered the Spike Jones version in 2012 on the 9-CD project, The Encyclopedia of Recorded Comedy Music.

== See also ==
- List of number-one singles of 1952 (U.S.)
