= Cross over the Bridge =

1945 song by Bennie Benjamin and George David Weiss

Song
- Published: 1945
- Songwriters: Bennie Benjamin, George David Weiss

"Cross over the Bridge" is a popular song written by Bennie Benjamin and George David Weiss and published in 1945.

== Patti Page version ==
The best-selling version of the song was recorded by Patti Page in 1954. Page's version was released by Mercury Records as catalog number 70302, with the flip side "My Restless Lover," and first entered the Billboard charts on February 17, 1954, staying on the charts for 23 weeks. Page's version reached No. 3 on Billboard's chart of "Best Sellers in Stores", while reaching No. 2 on Billboard's chart of "Most Played in Juke Boxes", and No. 3 on Billboard's chart of "Most Played by Jockeys".

== Other versions ==
- In the United Kingdom a version was recorded in April 1954 by Billie Anthony and Tony Brent and released on the Columbia label, catalog No. DB 3450.
- The song was covered in 1954 by The Chords for Cat Records (a subsidiary of Atlantic Records).
- Anne Shelton with Ken Mackintosh and his orchestra recorded their version in London on March 11, 1954. It was released by EMI on the His Master's Voice label as catalog number B 10680.
- The Beverley Sisters version was also recorded in 1954 and issued by Philips Records, catalog No. PB 257.
- The Norwegian swing/pop duo Bobbysocks! released a cover version in 1984 on their LP Bobbysocks!.
