= Allegheny Moon =

Single by Patti Page
- B-side: "The Strangest Romance"
- Released: May 14, 1956
- Genre: Traditional pop
- Length: 2:53
- Label: Mercury Records
- Songwriters: Al Hoffman, Dick Manning
- Producer: Vic Schoen

Patti Page singles chronology
"Too Young to Go Steady" (1956)	"Allegheny Moon" (1956)	"The Strangest Romance" (1956)

Allegheny Moon is a popular song written by Al Hoffman and Dick Manning and published in 1956.

The song is best known in a 1956 recording by Patti Page. This recording was released by Mercury Records as catalog number 70878, with the flip side The Strangest Romance. It first reached the Billboard magazine charts on June 16, 1956. On the Disk Jockey chart, it peaked at number 2; on the Best Seller chart, at number 5; on the Juke Box chart, at number 2; on the composite chart of the top 100 songs, it reached number 2. The song was also a hit in Australia peaking at number 3.

== Tracks ==
- A. "Allegheny Moon": Written-by – Hoffman*, Manning* 2:48
- B. "The Strangest Romance": Written-by – Fay Tishman 2:09

== Other recordings ==
- Bing Crosby and Lindsay Crosby recorded the song in 1956 for use on Bing Crosby's radio show and it was subsequently released on the CD New Tricks - 60th Anniversary Deluxe Edition (2017).
- Guy Mitchell included the song in his album A Guy in Love (1958).
- Anne Murray recorded a cover of the song for her album Croonin' (1993).
