= Christmas with Patti Page =

Studio album by Patti Page
- Released: 1951
- Genre: Christmas
- Label: Mercury

Patti Page chronology
Folk Song Favorites (1951)	Christmas with Patti Page (1951)	Tennessee Waltz (1952)

Professional ratings
Review scores
Source	Rating
Allmusic	4.5/5 stars

Christmas with Patti Page – not to be confused with the 1965 Columbia Records album of the same name - is a Patti Page album, first issued by Mercury Records in 1951 as catalog number MG-25109, and later reissued and expanded with four additional tracks in 1955 as catalog number MG-20093.

Later CD incarnations have been expanded with further bonus tracks culled from non-album singles, radio broadcasts, and television performances.

== Track listing ==
Original 1951 Mercury LP (MG 25109)

1. "Jingle Bells" – 2:26
2. "Silent Night" – 2:58
3. "Christmas Choir" – 2:44
4. "The First Noel" – 2:39
5. "Christmas Bells" – 2:34
6. "White Christmas" – 3:21
7. "Santa Claus Is Comin' to Town" – 2:43
8. "The Christmas Song" – 3:29

1955 Mercury LP (MG 20093)

1. "Jingle Bells" – 2:26
2. "Silent Night" – 2:58
3. "Christmas Choir" – 2:44
4. "The First Noel" – 2:39
5. "Christmas Bells" – 2:34
6. "White Christmas" – 3:21
7. "Santa Claus Is Coming to Town" – 2:43
8. "The Christmas Song" – 3:29
9. "Pretty Snowflakes" – 2:15
10. "I Want to Go Skating with Willie" – 2:11
11. "Where Did My Snowman Go" – 2:33
12. "The Mama Doll Song" – 2:42

1995 PolyGram CD (528373)

1. "Jingle Bells" – 2:26
2. "Silent Night" – 2:58
3. "Christmas Choir" – 2:44
4. "The First Noel" – 2:39
5. "Christmas Bells" – 2:34
6. "White Christmas" – 3:21
7. "Santa Claus Is Coming to Town" – 2:43
8. "The Christmas Song" – 3:29
9. "Pretty Snowflakes" – 2:15
10. "I Want to Go Skating with Willie" – 2:11
11. "Where Did My Snowman Go" – 2:33
12. "The Mama Doll Song" – 2:42
13. "Boogie Woogie Santa Claus" (Mercury Single, 1950) - 2:14

2013 Real Gone Music Deluxe Edition CD (RGM 0200)

1. "Jingle Bells" – 2:26
2. "Silent Night" – 2:58
3. "Christmas Choir" – 2:44
4. "The First Noel" – 2:39
5. "Christmas Bells" – 2:34
6. "White Christmas" – 3:21
7. "Santa Claus Is Coming to Town" – 2:43
8. "The Christmas Song" – 3:29
9. "Pretty Snowflakes" – 2:15
10. "I Want to Go Skating with Willie" – 2:11
11. "Where Did My Snowman Go" – 2:33
12. "The Mama Doll Song" – 2:42
13. "Boogie Woogie Santa Claus" (Mercury Single, 1950) - 2:14
14. "Little Donkey" (Mercury Single, 1959) - 2:14
15. "Home for the Holidays" (from The Patti Page Show, 1955) - 1:36
16. "Christmas Greeting from Patti" (Radio Spot) - :09
17. "The Christmas Song" (from The Patti Page Show, 1955) - 2:13
18. "Silent Night" (from The Patti Page Show, 1955) - 2:08

== Personnel ==
- Steven Fallone – Digital Remastering
- Bob Frank – Executive Producer
- Patti Page – Vocals
- Carmelo Roman – Art Direction
