= Fibbin' =

Song performed by Petula Clark

"Fibbin'" is a popular song, with music by Michael Merlo and words by Patrick Welch, written in 1958.

In the United States, the most popular version was a recording by Patti Page (Mercury Records catalog number 71355) that was made in 1958, entering the Billboard chart on September 28, 1958, lasting nine weeks, and reaching number 39 on the chart.

== Cover versions ==
- In the United Kingdom, Petula Clark recorded the song, in 1959.
