= Love After Midnight =

Studio album by Patti Page
- Released: July 1964
- Genre: Pop
- Label: Columbia

Patti Page chronology
Say Wonderful Things (1963)	Love After Midnight (1964)	Hush, Hush, Sweet Charlotte (1965)

Love After Midnight was a studio album by Patti Page, released by Columbia Records. It was released in July 1964 as a vinyl LP. The orchestra was conducted by Robert Mersey.

It was re-released in compact disc form, combined with Patti Page's 1963 album, Say Wonderful Things, by Collectables Records, on November 25, 2003.

== Track listing ==
Track number	Song	Songwriter(s)	Time
1	Love After Midnight	Bert Kaempfert, Joe Seneca, Herbert Rehbein	2:36
2	A Faded Summer Love	Phil Baxter	2:42
3	The Lamp Is Low	Maurice Ravel, Peter de Rose, Mitchell Parish, Bert Shefter	2:10
4	Stranger on the Shore	Acker Bilk, Robert Mellin	2:59
5	I Wonder, I Wonder, I Wonder	Daryl Hutchins	2:10
6	All the Way	Jimmy Van Heusen, Sammy Cahn	3:03
7	I Adore You	Vic Schoen	2:30
8	Foolishly Yours	Leonard Joy, Alice Simms	2:44
9	Born to Lose	Ted Daffan	2:54
10	Oh! What It Seemed to Be	Frankie Carle, Bennie Benjamin, George David Weiss	2:41
11	September Song	Kurt Weill, Maxwell Anderson	2:55
12	The Sweetest Sounds	Richard Rodgers	2:23
