= A Poor Man's Roses (Or a Rich Man's Gold) =

Single by Patsy Cline
- A-side: "Walkin' After Midnight"
- Released: February 11, 1957
- Recorded: November 8, 1956
- Studio: Bradley Studios, Nashville, Tennessee
- Genre: Country; Nashville sound
- Length: 2:45
- Label: Decca
- Songwriters: Bob Hilliard; Milton De Lugg
- Producers: Owen Bradley; Paul Cohen

Patsy Cline singles chronology
"Stop, Look and Listen" (1956)	"A Poor Man's Roses (Or a Rich Man's Gold)" (1957)	"Today, Tomorrow and Forever" (1957)

"A Poor Man's Roses (or a Rich Man's Gold)" is a song was written by Bob Hilliard (lyricist) and Milton De Lugg (composer). The song was popularized by both Patsy Cline and Patti Page in 1957. Cline rerecorded the song with a string arrangement and in stereo, in 1961. Page recorded the song again in 1981.

== Chart performances ==
The song was first recorded by Patsy Cline on November 8, 1956. It was released on the flip side of her single "Walkin' After Midnight." The song reached number 14 on the Most Played C&W by Jockeys chart that year for Cline.

The 1957 Page recording was issued by Mercury Records as catalog number 71059, (the flip side of "The Wall") and first reached the Billboard magazine charts on March 23, 1957. On the Disk Jockey chart, it peaked at number 14; on the composite chart of the top 100 songs, it reached number 27. The 1981 Page recording was issued by Plantation Records as catalog number PL-201, (the flip side of "On the Inside") and first reached the Billboard country music chart on July 18, 1981, lasting 6 weeks and peaking at number 66, in a joint listing with its flip side.
