= Belonging to Someone =

Single by Patti Page
- B-side: "Bring Us Together"
- Released: December 13, 1958
- Genre: Traditional pop
- Length: 2:05
- Label: Mercury
- Songwriters: Al Hoffman and Dick Manning

Patti Page singles chronology
"Belonging to Someone" (1958)	"Another Time, Another Place" (1958)

"Belonging to Someone" is a popular song, written by Al Hoffman and Dick Manning and published in 1957.

It was popularized by Patti Page in 1958, reaching the US Billboard charts in January 1958. The Page recording was released by Mercury Records as catalog number 71247. On the Disk Jockey chart, it peaked at #13; on the Best Seller chart, at #32; on the composite chart of the top 100 songs, it reached #34.
