= And I Thought About You (Patti Page album) =

Studio album by Patti Page
- Released: 1955
- Recorded: 1954
- Genre: Vocal pop
- Label: Mercury

Patti Page chronology
So Many Memories (1954)	And I Thought About You (1955)	Romance on the Range (1955)

And I Thought About You is a Patti Page album, issued by Mercury Records as a 10" long-playing record, as catalog number MG-25209 in 1955. This was her eighth album for Mercury.

== Reception ==
Billboard magazine liked it saying "Mercury's top songbird is in fine vocal form here on a group of eight preferred standards... Patti Page sings a ballad with tenderness, taste, and, most important of all, warm sincerity. Her fans are bound to consider this package a “must” buy, and deejays will find it a perfect programming for romantic wax segs."

== Track listing ==
Side 1
No.	Title	Length
1.	"I Thought About You"	2:45
2.	"While a Cigarette Was Burning" (Charles & Nick Kenny)"	2:53
3.	"The Touch of Your Lips"	2:40
4.	"Where Are You?"	3:05

Side 2
No.	Title	Length
5.	"Come Rain or Come Shine"	3:20
6.	"I Wished on the Moon"	2:41
7.	"Stay as Sweet as You Are" (Harry Revel / Mack Gordon)"	2:44
8.	"When Your Lover Has Gone"	2:41
