= Changing Partners =

1953 pop song

- UK pressing of the original 78 rpm record by Kay Starr

Song
- Published: 1953
- Composer: Larry Coleman
- Lyricist: Joe Darion

"Changing Partners"

Single by Patti Page
- B-side: "Where Did My Snowman Go?" (Reissued in 1954 with "Don't Get Around Much Anymore" as the B-side)
- Released: November 28, 1953
- Recorded: September 21, 1953
- Genre: Traditional pop
- Length: 2:45
- Label: Mercury
- Composer: Larry Coleman
- Lyricist: Joe Darion

Patti Page singles chronology
"My World is You" (1953)	"Changing Partners" (1953)	"Cross Over the Bridge" (1954)

"Changing Partners" is a pop song with music by Larry Coleman and lyrics by Joe Darion, published in 1953. The best-known recording was made by Patti Page. It was also recorded the same year by Dinah Shore, Kay Starr and Bing Crosby.

== Hit versions ==
- The version by Patti Page was recorded on September 21, 1953 and released by Mercury Records as catalog number 70260. It started on the Billboard charts on November 21, 1953, staying on the chart for 21 weeks and reaching number three in 1954. She re-recorded the song for her 1966 album Patti Page's Greatest Hits.
- The version by Dinah Shore with Hugo Winterhalter's orchestra and chorus was recorded on October 15, 1953 and released by RCA Victor Records as catalog number 20-5515 (in USA) and by EMI on the His Master's Voice label as catalog number B 10634. The American release reached No. 12 on the Billboard charts in 1954.
- The version by Kay Starr was recorded on October 22, 1953 and released by Capitol Records as catalog number 2657. It started on the Billboard charts on December 5, 1953, staying on the chart for 9 weeks and reaching No. 13 in 1954. It also reached No. 4 in the UK in 1954.
- The version by Bing Crosby was recorded on November 14, 1953 and released by Decca Records as catalog number 28969. It started on the Billboard charts on January 23, 1954, staying on the chart for 2 weeks and reaching No. 17. It reached No. 9 on the UK chart. This version was also included in Crosby's 1954 album Bing Sings the Hits.

== Other recordings ==
- 1954 Pee Wee King reached number 4 on the country music charts in 1954.
- 1954 Helen Forrest - a single release for Bell Records.
- 1954 Bill Monroe and His Blue Grass Boys recorded the song for Decca (No. 29021).
- 1954 Lita Roza issued the song on a single release.
- 1954 Dorothy Squires also recorded the song for single release.
- 1954 The Beverley Sisters recorded a single version for the Philips label (No. PB 231).
- 1961 Miki & Griff included the song on the album Miki and Griff.
- 2009 Elvis Costello's album, Secret, Profane & Sugarcane, includes a version of this song to close the album.
- Fong Fei-fei covered the song in Mandarin as "舞伴淚影" (English: "Shadow of teardrops from a partner" or idiomatically "Tearful silhouette of a partner").

== Film appearances ==
- The 1984 Canadian film Isaac Littlefeathers opened with a recording of the Tennessee Waltz followed by a recording of "Changing Partners".
- The Helen Forrest version was also featured in the 2012 film The Master directed by Paul Thomas Anderson.
