= Hush, Hush, Sweet Charlotte (album) =

Studio album by Patti Page
- Released: March 1965
- Genre: Pop
- Label: Columbia
- Producer: Bob Johnston

Patti Page chronology
Love After Midnight (1964)	Hush, Hush, Sweet Charlotte (1965)	Christmas with Patti Page (1965)

Hush, Hush, Sweet Charlotte was a studio album by Patti Page, released by Columbia Records. It was released in March 1965 as a vinyl LP.

== Chart performance ==
Hush, Hush, Sweet Charlotte became Page's final album to chart on the top-half of the LP charts. The album debuted on Billboard magazine's Top LP's chart in the issue dated May 22, 1965, peaking at No. 27 during a twenty-six-week run on the chart. It also entered the Cashbox magazine's Top 100 Albums chart in the issue dated May 22, 1965, peaking at No. 23 during a sixteen-week run on the chart.

== Reissue ==
The album was reissued, combined with the 1968 Patti Page album Gentle on My Mind, in compact disc format, by Collectables Records on August 24, 1999.

== Track listing ==
Original LP
No.	Title	Writer(s)	Length
1.	"Hush, Hush, Sweet Charlotte"	Frank De Vol, Mack David	2:29
2.	"Try to Remember"	Tom Jones, Harvey Schmidt	3:02
3.	"The Green Leaves of Summer"	Dimitri Tiomkin, Paul Francis Webster	2:03
4.	"Jamaica Farewell"	Lord Burgess	2:29
5.	"Croce di oro (Cross of Gold)"	Kim Gannon	2:57
6.	"Who's Gonna Shoe My Pretty Little Feet"	Clara Ann Fowler, Jack Rael	2:15
7.	"Black Is the Color of My True Love's Hair"	Traditional	2:33
8.	"Longing to Hold You Again"	Don Robertson	2:19
9.	"Danny Boy"	Frederic Weatherly	3:05
10.	"Can't Help Falling in Love"	George Weiss, Hugo Peretti, Luigi Creatore	2:19
11.	"Scarlet Ribbons (For Her Hair)"	Evelyn Danzig, Jack Segal	3:49

== Charts ==
Chart peaks for Hush, Hush, Sweet Charlotte
Chart (1963)	Peak position
US Billboard Top LPs	27
US Cashbox Top 100 Albums	23
