= Money, Marbles, and Chalk =

Song by Garner Eckler
- Recorded: 1949
- Genre: Popular song
- Songwriter: Garner Eckler

"Money, Marbles, and Chalk" is a popular song, written by Garner "Pop" Eckler in 1949. Eckler also recorded the song, but the biggest-selling version was recorded by Patti Page in 1949, and issued by Mercury Records. It entered the Billboard chart on April 23, 1949, at number 27, lasting only that one week. The song also spent a week on the Billboard Most Played Jukebox (Country & Western) Records chart, at position number 15.

== Cover versions ==
Several artists have recorded the song, including by a group called "Pop's Boys" in June 2009. The group is made up of two of Garner Eckler's nephews, Greg Eckler and Mike Fletcher.
