= The Patti Page Show =

The Patti Page Show is an American television series which aired from 1955 to 1956. It aired in a 15-minute time-slot, with two commercial breaks for sponsor Oldsmobile. In the series, Patti Page lip-synced pop songs, mostly standards, with additional songs by the Page Five singers, a vocal group of three men and two women. The series aired in first-run syndication. It was produced by Screen Gems. There were 78 quarter-hour episodes, which around 1958 were edited into 31 half-hour episodes.

In its quarter-hour form, the program was sold to the UK and Australia. In London it was broadcast on ITV (ATV) and in Australia on TCN-9 and HSV-7. The Patti Page show was the very first US show ever aired on Australian television.
