= Hush, Hush, Sweet Charlotte (song) =

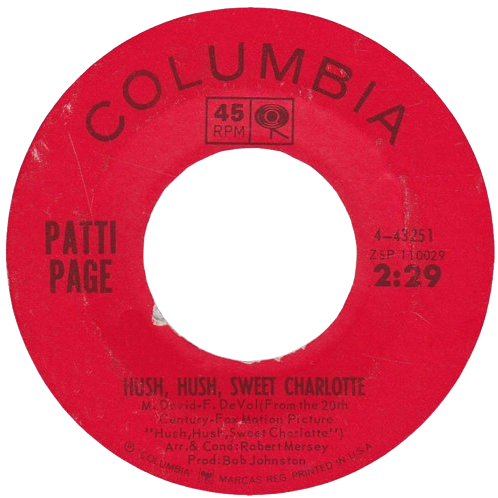

Single by Patti Page

from the album Hush, Hush, Sweet Charlotte
- B-side: "Longing to Hold You Again"
- Released: April 1965
- Genre: Easy listening; traditional pop
- Length: 2:29
- Label: Columbia
- Songwriters: Frank DeVol, Mack David
- Producer: Bob Johnston

Patti Page singles chronology
| "Days of the Waltzes" (1964) | "Hush, Hush, Sweet Charlotte" (1965) | "You Can't Be True, Dear" (1965) |

"Hush, Hush, Sweet Charlotte" is a popular song with music by Frank De Vol and lyrics by Mack David, introduced in the 1964 film Hush...Hush, Sweet Charlotte starring Bette Davis. The song's title appears with varying punctuation in its different versions: this article indicates how each specific version styled the title.

Originally, the film and the song did not share a title, the working title of the film being What Ever Happened to Cousin Charlotte?. Reportedly, Bette Davis disliked the working title feeling it falsely indicated a sequel to What Ever Happened to Baby Jane? and, the song with the opening lyric "Hush, hush, sweet Charlotte" having been written early in the film's development and having been played for Davis, she suggested Hush...Hush, Sweet Charlotte should serve as the film's title.

== Background ==
In the storyline of the film, the song is written for Davis' character: the aging Southern belle Charlotte Hollis, by her would-be lover John Mayhew whose murder thirty-seven years ago is generally ascribed to Charlotte. The song also effectively functions as the film's theme as its lyrics in effect reference how Charlotte will obsess over her lost love throughout most of her life. The song's melody plays on a music box which Charlotte treasures, and is also a feature of the gaslighting to which Charlotte's subjected, as she hears the song played on the harpsichord while she tries to sleep. Davis as Charlotte is also seen playing the song on the harpsichord and singing the most lyrically complete version of the song heard in the film, the Al Martino recording of the song only being heard for one chorus under the film's closing credits. The "Hush...Hush, Sweet Charlotte" song is heard in full as an instrumental - by the Frank DeVol Orchestra - under the film's opening credits, just prior to which a group of juvenile tormentors sing a debased version of the chorus, referencing Charlotte's supposed murder of John Mayhew.

The Al Martino recording of "Hush...Hush, Sweet Charlotte", heard at the end the film, was relegated to the B-side of his January 1965 single release "My Heart Would Know" which reached No. 52 on the Billboard Hot 100; "Hush...Hush, Sweet Charlotte" would be featured on Martino's Somebody Is Taking My Place album.

== Patti Page recording ==
When the song earned an Academy Award nomination for Best Song, Bette Davis herself reportedly was hoping to perform it: however Patti Page performed "Hush, Hush, Sweet Charlotte" on the April 5, 1965 37th Academy Awards broadcast, Page singing the song from the perspective of a third-party reassuring Charlotte that she [i.e. Charlotte] has John's constant devotion: Page had recorded the song in a February 17, 1965 session at Columbia Recording Studio in Nashville.

Despite the song's being bested for the Academy Award by "Chim Chim Cher-ee" from Mary Poppins, a recording of Page's rendition of "Hush, Hush, Sweet Charlotte" was rush-released to become the singer's first top 40 hit on Columbia Records as of the Billboard Hot 100 chart dated May 22, 1965, rising as high as No. 8 on the Hot 100 dated June 26, 1965. "Hush, Hush, Sweet Charlotte" ranked as Page's first top twenty hit since 1958 and earned her a fifteenth and final gold record for sales of one million units. The track also reached number two on the Easy Listening chart. Page's producer Bob Johnston impressed Columbia Records by facilitating Page's scoring of a major hit that Johnston was given the plum assignment of producing the Highway 61 Revisited album by Bob Dylan. "Hush, Hush, Sweet Charlotte" served as the title cut for Page's May 1965 album release which consisted of songs with a folk song influence.

=== Chart performance ===
| Chart (1965) | Peak position |
|---|---|
| Canada Top Singles RPM | 8 |
| Hong Kong | 1 |
| US Billboard Easy Listening | 2 |
| US Billboard Hot 100 | 8 |

== Other versions ==
- Lyricist Mack David produced a recording of "Hush Hush Sweet Charlotte" by Hoyt Axton.
- A cover version of "Hush, Hush, Sweet Charlotte" was cut by Bruce Forsyth to compete with the June 1965 UK release of the Patti Page single; neither the Forsyth single - which featured the Mike Sammes Singers - nor that by Page reached the UK charts.
- Richard Chamberlain's rendition of "Hush... Hush, Sweet Charlotte" appeared on his September 1965 album release Joy in the Morning which consisted of songs from films or stage musicals.
- "Hush, Hush, Sweet Charlotte" also was featured on the 1965 album Chris Connor Sings Gentle Bossa Nova.
- The Bette Davis version of "Hush... Hush, Sweet Charlotte" was first released on the 1976 album Miss Bette Davis.
- The instrumental version of the movie's theme - as "Hush Hush Sweet Charlotte" - was featured on the 1965 album release Theme from Peyton Place and 11 Other Great Themes by the Frank DeVol Orchestra and was issued as the B-side of that album's single "Theme from Peyton Place".
- Saxophone virtuoso Gerry Mulligan also recorded an instrumental version of "Hush, Hush Sweet Charlotte" for his 1965 album If You Can't Beat 'Em, Join 'Em which consisted of songs which had recently been mainstream pop hits.
- The song was also recorded in 1965 by Eija Merilä (fi) as "Tuuli Kuiskaa Sen" Finnish and by Birthe Wilke as "Sov Sød Charlotte" Danish.
