= And So to Sleep Again =

Single by Patti Page

from the album America's Greatest Hits
- A-side: "One Sweet Letter"
- Released: August 1951
- Recorded: 1951
- Genre: Pop
- Length: 4:02
- Label: Mercury Records
- Songwriters: Joe Marsala and Sunny Skylar

Patti Page singles chronology
"Detour" (1951)	"And So to Sleep Again" (1951)	"That's All I Ask of You" (1951)

"And So to Sleep Again" is a popular song, written in 1951 by Joe Marsala and Sunny Skylar.

It was popularized by Patti Page in 1951. The Page recording was issued by Mercury Records as catalog number 5706, and first reached the Billboard chart on September 22, 1951, lasting 16 weeks and peaking at number 4.

== Other recordings ==
It was also recorded in America by Dick Haymes, April Stevens and Margaret Whiting, and British covers were recorded by Jimmy Young and Dorothy Squires. It peaked at number 21 in the British sheet music charts. Coleman Hawkins also recorded it in October 1951
