= With My Eyes Wide Open, I'm Dreaming =

Song by Jack Oakie and Dorothy Dell
- Published: 1934
- Composer: Harry Revel
- Lyricist: Mack Gordon

"With My Eyes Wide Open, I'm Dreaming" is a popular song. The music was composed by Harry Revel with lyrics by Mack Gordon, and published in 1934. The song was introduced by Jack Oakie and Dorothy Dell in the movie Shoot the Works directed in 1934 by Wesley Ruggles. That year, two cover versions made the charts. The song was revived in 1949 via a hit version by Patti Page which climbed to the top-15 of the pop charts in 1950. A different recording by Page reached the top-60 in 1959 and marked the final commercially successful release for the song.

== Background ==
The first versions to make the charts were in 1934 when Leo Reisman's version reached number three and Isham Jones's version reached number 11. That same year the song was recorded by Ruth Etting.

Patti Page had a number 11 hit with "With My Eyes Wide Open, I'm Dreaming" (Mercury Records #5344) in 1950. Having previously recorded both vocal parts on the duet "Confess", Page had been intrigued by the possibility of using overdubbing techniques to record as a "one-woman quartet"; when Mercury a&r director Mitch Miller received Page's suggestion skeptically the singer prepped a demo showcasing her multi-tracked vocals which drew Millers' consent to have Page record "With My Eyes Wide Open..." in this manner. Recorded in a 3 December 1949 session in New York City with Jack Rael conducting his orchestra, "With My Eyes Wide Open..." became Page's first million-seller and established her trademark vocal sound. Page re-recorded "With My Eyes Wide Open..." - with what was considered a "rock and roll" arrangement - in an 11 May 1959 session in New York City: this version reached number 59.

"With My Eyes Wide Open, I'm Dreaming" was also sung by Dean Martin in the 1952 film The Stooge. "With My Eyes Wide Open, I'm Dreaming" was sung by Dorothy Dell in the 1934 film 'Shoot the Works.'

== Recorded versions ==
- Mandy Barnett (1999)
- Pat Boone (1965)
- Al Bowlly with Lew Stone and his Band (recorded August 1, 1934, released by UK Decca Records as catalog number F-5152)
- Russ Case and his orchestra (released by MGM Records as catalog number 10644B, with the flip side "Symphony of Spring")
- Natalie Cole (1999)
- Ray Conniff (1964)
- the Four Lads (1965)
- Dolores Gray (1950)
- The Ink Spots (1950)
- Isham Jones and his Orchestra (vocal: Joe Martin) (recorded May 10, 1934, released by Victor Records as catalog number 24643, with the flip side "Do I Love You?")
- Gene Kardos and his orchestra (recorded May 15, 1934, released by Vocalion Records as catalog number 2722, with the flip side "All I Do Is Dream of You")
- Greta Keller (recorded June 2, 1934)
- Dean Martin (recorded November 20, 1952, released January 12, 1953 on album Dean Martin Sings)
- Will Osborne and his orchestra (recorded May 17, 1934, released by Banner Records as catalog number 33075 and released by Melotone Records as catalog number 13039, also [the same or another recording] released by Romeo Records as catalog number 2283, all with the flip side "Do I Love You?")
- Patti Page (recorded on December 3, 1949, released by Mercury Records as catalog number 5344, with the flip side "Oklahoma Blues", redone in 1959)
- Leo Reisman and his Orchestra (vocal: George Beuler) (1934)
