= Tony Brent =

British singer (1926–1993)

Background information
- Born: Reginald Hogan Bretagne; 13 August 1926; Byculla, Bombay, India
- Died: 19 June 1993 (aged 65) Sydney, Australia
- Genres: Traditional pop
- Occupation: Singer
- Instrument: Vocals
- Years active: 1949 – early 1980s
- Labels: Columbia

Tony Brent (born Reginald Hogan Bretagne; 13 August 1926 – 19 June 1993) was a British traditional pop singer, most active in the 1950s. He scored seven top 20 chart hits in the UK over an almost six-year period, starting in December 1952.

== Biography ==
Brent was born Reginald Hogan Bretagne of Anglo-Indian descent and lived at Ebrahim Terrace, Spence Road, Byculla, Bombay, India. During the 1950s Brent became a popular UK-based vocalist, having relocated there on Boxing Day in 1947. Two years after his move, Brent entered and won in a talent show held at the Regal Theatre in Kingston. He sang "Some Enchanted Evening", which led on to working with both Ambrose and Cyril Stapleton's BBC Showband. His subsequent chart hits included "Walkin' to Missouri", "Cindy, Oh Cindy" and "Dark Moon". Brent's hits were all released on the Columbia label. He enjoyed iconic status in South Asia, where his hits topped the music charts on Radio Ceylon.

He resumed his travels in 1961 and left the UK to live in Australia. He owned a succession of Indian food restaurants whilst maintaining his singing career. Brent died in Sydney at the age of 65 of a heart attack in June 1993. His ashes were scattered in the Ganges.

== Chart single discography ==
All entries relate to the UK singles chart.

- "Walkin' to Missouri" (1952) – no. 7
- "Make it Soon" (1953) – no. 9
- "Got You on My Mind" (1953) – no. 12
- "Cindy, Oh Cindy" (1956) – no. 16
- "Dark Moon" (1957) – no. 17
- "The Clouds Will Soon Roll By" (1958) – no. 20
- "Girl of My Dreams" (1958) – no. 16
- "Why Should I Be Lonely?" (1959) – no. 24

== See also ==
- List of Anglo-Indians
