= Mister and Mississippi =

Song by Tennessee Ernie Ford
- Genre: Pop
- Label: Capitol Records
- Songwriter: Irving Gordon

"Mister and Mississippi" is a popular song, written by Irving Gordon. It was published in 1951 and first recorded by Tennessee Ernie Ford the same year.

== Background ==
The popularity of this song apparently led Gordon, a number of years later, to create another song with even more puns on state names: "Delaware."

== Other 1951 recordings ==
The song was popularized by Patti Page. The Page recording was issued by Mercury Records as catalog number 5645, and first reached the Billboard chart on May 19, 1951, lasting 15 weeks and peaking at number 8.

The recording by Dennis Day was released by RCA Victor as catalog number 47-4140. It first reached the Billboard Best Seller chart on June 1, 1951 and lasted 11 weeks on the chart, peaking at number 15.

On Cash Box's charts, where all versions were combined, the song peaked at number 6 on the chart.

== Other recordings ==
It has been recorded by many others, including:

- Rex Allen
- Eddy Arnold
- Johnny Bond & the Cass County Boys
- Johnny Desmond
