= Confess (song) =

1947 song by Bennie Benjamin and George David Weiss

"Confess" is a popular song written by Bennie Benjamin and George David Weiss.

The song figures in the early careers of two important female singers:

1. In 1947, Doris Day was making a transition from a Big band singer, most recently with Les Brown, to a solo vocalist. Her first major record away from the band was a duet with Buddy Clark, with this song on one side and "Love Somebody" on the other. The record became a two-sided hit, the first two of a string of hits for Day that made her one of the top female singers in popular music.
2. About the same time, Mercury Records was planning to record the song as a vehicle for Frankie Laine. They were persuaded instead to give the song to a young female singer, who had not, at the time, a single hit: Patti Page. Page's manager, Jack Rael, succeeded in getting Mercury to let her record the song, but because of a low budget, a second singer could not be hired, so guitarist George Barnes (musician), whose trio accompanied Page on the record, and who had been experimenting with multi-track recording with engineer Bill Putnam, suggested that Page sing the second part as well. The novelty of her doing two voices on one record probably contributed to the song becoming a top 20 hit for her. This became not only the first of many hits for Patti Page, but the first song on which a singer did more than one track. For Patti Page, multi-tracking became a trademark of her style, while others, such as Les Paul and Mary Ford, as well as Jane Turzy, took up this practice too.

The Day/Clark recording was recorded on November 21, 1947, and issued by Columbia Records as catalog number 38174, and first reached the Billboard chart on June 26, 1948, lasting 11 weeks and peaking at #16 on the chart.

The Page recording was recorded on December 3, 1947, and released by Mercury Records as catalog number 5129, with the flip side “Twelve O'Clock Flight” (also later as catalog number 5511), and first reached the Billboard chart on July 2, 1948, lasting 10 weeks and peaking at #12.

== Other recordings ==
- Nat King Cole and the King Cole Trio, recorded on November 6, 1947, and released by Capitol Records as catalog number ETB-391
- Jimmy Dorsey and his orchestra (released by MGM Records as catalog number 10194, with the flip side “If I Were You”)
- The Four Tunes (released by Manor Records as catalog number 1131, with the flip side “Don't Know”)
- Tony Martin (recorded on November 20, 1947, released by RCA Victor Records as catalog number 20-2812, with the flip side “Bride and Groom Polka”)
- The Mills Brothers (recorded on December 23, 1947, released by Decca Records as catalog number 24409, with the flip side “Someone Cares”)
- Jimmy Valentine orchestra (vocal: Barbara Brown) (released by Varsity Records as catalog number 106, with the flip side “Twelfth Street Rag”)
