= All My Love (Patti Page song) =

"All My Love (Bolero)"

Single by Patti Page
- B-side: "Roses Remind Me of You"
- Released: August 1950
- Genre: Pop
- Length: 3:13
- Label: Mercury Records 5455
- Songwriters: Paul Durand, Mitchell Parish

Patti Page singles chronology
"I Don't Care if the Sun Don't Shine" (1950)	"All My Love (Bolero)" (1950)	"Back in Your Own Backyard" (1950)

"All My Love" is a 1950 popular song. The subtitle, in brackets, is Bolero. The music was written by Paul Durand. French lyrics under the title "Bolero" were written by Henri Contet, the English lyrics by Mitchell Parish.

== Patti Page recording ==
It was popularized by Patti Page in 1950. The Page recording was issued by Mercury Records as catalog number 5455, and first reached the Billboard chart on August 26, 1950, lasting 22 weeks and peaking at number one. It was her first number-one hit.

== Other versions ==
The much-covered hit was also popular in 1950 in versions by:

- Guy Lombardo (reached the No. 10 position in the Billboard charts)
- Percy Faith (No. 7 position), Bing Crosby with Jeff Alexander Chorus and Victor Young and His Orchestra (recorded June 23, 1950), No. 11 position)
- Dennis Day (No. 22 position).
- Caterina Valente also recorded the song for Decca Records in 1958.
- Pinchi, pseudonym of Giuseppe Perotti, an Italian lyricist, wrote an adaptation in the language, entitled "Bolero", which was recorded by Carlo Buti on Columbia CQ 2077 for the Astoria Music Editions of Milan, Via Orefici.
