= These Things I Offer You (for a Lifetime) =

Single by Sarah Vaughan
- B-side: "Summertime"
- Released: 1951
- Label: Columbia
- Songwriters: Morty Nevins; Bennie Benjamin; George Weiss

"These Things I Offer You (for a Lifetime)", or simply "These Things I Offer You", is a song that was a hit in 1951 for Sarah Vaughan, who recorded it for Columbia with the orchestra under the direction of Percy Faith.

== Composition ==
The song was written by Morty Nevins, Bennie Benjamin, and George Weiss.

== Critical reception ==
Professional ratings
Review scores
Source	Rating
Billboard	84/100
Metronome	B−

Billboard reviewed Sara Vaughan's recording (Columbia 39370, coupled with "Deep Purple") on 19 May 1951, writing "Another potent interpretation here, as the thrush delivers the new ballad with warmth and a commendably commercial simplicity, again in a strong ork setting" and rating it 86 ("excellent") for disk jockeys and 84 ("excellent") overall.

== Commercial performance ==
Vaughan's single peaked at No. 11 on Billboard's Records Most Played by Disk Jockeys chart.

== Charts ==
Chart (1951)	Peak position
US Billboard Records Most Played by Disk Jockeys	11
