= Romance on the Range (album) =

Studio album by Patti Page
- Released: July 1955
- Genres: Traditional pop, country
- Label: Mercury

Patti Page chronology
And I Thought About You (1955)	Romance on the Range (1955)	Manhattan Tower (1956)

Romance on the Range is an album by Patti Page. It was issued in July 1955 as a vinyl LP. It collected recordings from a previous folk album and various singles.

== Track listing ==
Track number	Title	Songwriter(s)
A1	"Down in the Valley"	Traditional
A2	"Leanin' on the Old Top Rail"	Charles & Nick Kenny
A3	"Tumbling Tumbleweeds"	Bob Nolan
A4	"I Want to Be a Cowboy's Sweetheart"	Patsy Montana
A5	"Detour"	Paul Westmoreland
A6	"The Prisoner's Song"	Guy Massey
B1	"Who's Gonna Shoe My Pretty Little Feet?"	Clara Ann Fowler / Jack Rael
B2	"San Antonio Rose”	Bob Wills
B3	"Oklahoma Blues"	Jack Rael
B4	"Mockin' Bird Hill"	Vaughn Horton
B5	"Down the Trail of Achin' Hearts"	Nat Simon / Jimmy Kennedy
B6	"Whispering"	Vincent Rose / John Schoenberger / Richard Coburn
