= Patti Page =

American country-pop singer (1927–2013)

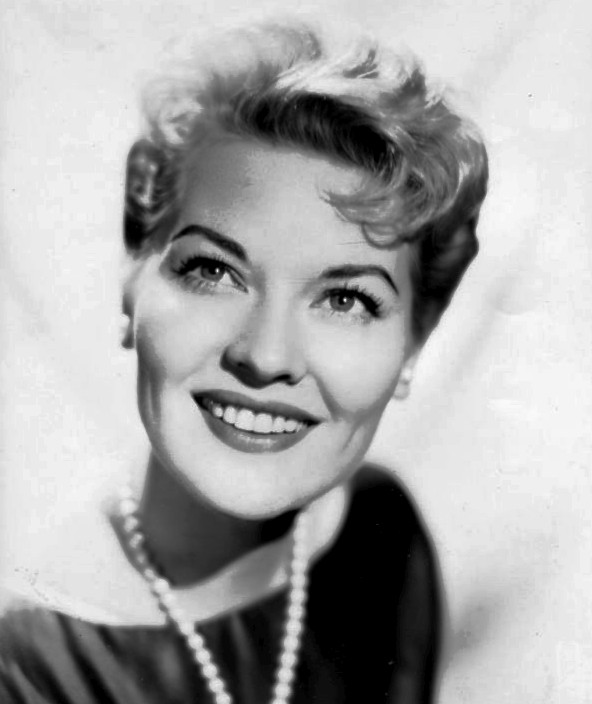
- Page in the 1950s
- Born: Clara Ann Fowler; November 8, 1927; Claremore, Oklahoma, U.S.
- Died: January 1, 2013 (aged 85); Encinitas, California, U.S.
- Resting place: El Camino Memorial Park, San Diego
- Occupations: Singer; actress
- Known for: Tennessee Waltz; All My Love (Bolero); I Went to Your Wedding (How Much Is) That Doggie in the Window? Old Cape Cod; Allegheny Moon
- Musical career
- Genres: Traditional pop; country
- Instrument: Contralto vocals
- Years active: 1946–2012
- Labels: Mercury; Columbia; Epic; Avco; Plantation

Clara Ann Fowler (November 8, 1927 – January 1, 2013), better known by her stage name Patti Page, was an American singer. Primarily known for pop and country music, she was the top-charting female vocalist and best-selling female artist of the 1950s, selling over 100 million records during a six-decade-long career. She was often introduced as "the Singin' Rage, Miss Patti Page". New York WNEW disc-jockey William B. Williams introduced her as "A Page in my life called Patti".

Page signed with Mercury Records in 1947, and became their first successful female artist, starting with 1948's "Confess". In 1950, she had her first million-selling single "With My Eyes Wide Open, I'm Dreaming", and eventually had 14 additional million-selling singles between 1950 and 1965.

Page's signature song, "Tennessee Waltz", is the best selling song of the 1950s by a female artist, one of the biggest-selling singles of the 20th century, and is recognized today as one of the official songs of the state of Tennessee. It spent 13 weeks atop the Billboard's best-sellers list in 1950/51. Page had three additional number-one hit singles between 1950 and 1953, "All My Love (Bolero)", "I Went to Your Wedding", and "(How Much Is) That Doggie in the Window?".

Unlike most other pop singers, Page blended country music styles into many of her songs. As a result of this crossover appeal, many of Page's singles appeared on the Billboard Country Chart. In the 1970s, she shifted her style more toward country music and began having even more success on the country charts, ending up as one of the few vocalists to have charted in five separate decades.

With the rise of rock and roll in the 1950s, mainstream popular music record sales began to decline. Page was among the few pop singers who were able to maintain popularity, continuing to have hits well into the 1960s, with "Old Cape Cod", "Allegheny Moon", "A Poor Man's Roses (or a Rich Man's Gold)", and "Hush, Hush, Sweet Charlotte".

In 1997, Patti Page was inducted into the Oklahoma Music Hall of Fame. She was posthumously honored with the Lifetime Achievement Grammy Award in 2013.

== Early life ==
Clara Ann Fowler was born on November 8, 1927, in Claremore, Oklahoma (some sources give Muskogee, Oklahoma) into a large and poor family of 11 children (3 boys and 8 girls). Her father, B.A. Fowler, worked on the MKT railroad, while her mother, Margaret, and older sisters picked cotton. As she recalled on television many years later, the family lived without electricity, so she could not read after dark. She was raised in Foraker, Hardy, Muskogee, and Avant, Oklahoma, before attending Daniel Webster High School in Tulsa, from which she graduated in 1945.

Fowler started her career as a singer with Al Clauser and his Oklahoma Outlaws at radio station KTUL in Tulsa, Oklahoma. At age 18, she became a featured performer on the station for a 15-minute radio program sponsored by the Page Milk Company. As a nod to the show's sponsor, Fowler was referred to on the air as "Patti Page". In 1946, Jack Rael, a saxophone player and manager of the Jimmy Joy Band, came to Tulsa for a one-night stand. Rael heard Page on the radio, liked her voice, and asked her to join the band. After leaving the band, Rael became Page's personal manager.

Page toured the United States with the Jimmy Joy Band in 1946. The following year the band traveled to Chicago, where she sang with a small group led by popular orchestra leader Benny Goodman. This led to Page getting picked up by Mercury Records. She became Mercury's "girl singer".

== Career ==
=== Pop success: 1946–1949 ===
Page cut her first two discs ("Every So Often/What Every Woman Knows" and "There's A Man In My Life/The First Time I Kissed You") with the Eddie Getz and George Barnes Orchestras but they failed to chart.

She found success with her third single ("Confess" b/w "Twelve O'Clock Flight"). The arrangement of "Confess" was meant to use a backing chorus, but Mercury would not pay for one since Page had not yet produced a charting single, so if she wanted additional singers she would have to hire them at her own expense. Instead, her manager Jack Rael decided to try an experiment. Bill Putnam, an engineer for Mercury Records, was able to overdub Page's voice by syncing the two master discs together—tape recording was not in use yet and this technique was difficult to pull off. Thus, Page became the first pop artist to harmonize her own vocals on a recording. This gimmick got "Confess" to No. 12 on the Billboard. This technique later was used on Page's biggest hit singles in the 1950s. Page had four more singles chart in 1948–49, with two ("So In Love" and "With My Eyes Wide Open, I'm Dreaming" reaching the top 15. Page also had a top 15 hit on the Billboard country chart in 1949 with "Money, Marbles, and Chalk". After the experiment of "Confess" worked, Page and Rael got more ambitious and began trying four part overdubs.

In 1950, Page had her first million-selling single "With My Eyes Wide Open, I'm Dreaming", another song where she harmonized her vocals. Because she was overdubbing her vocals, Page's name had to be listed on the recording credits as a group. According to one early 1950s chart, Page was credited as the Patti Page Quartet. In mid-1950, Page's single "All My Love (Bolero)" became her first No. 1 on the Billboard spending five weeks there. That same year, she also had her first top-10 hit with "I Don't Care if the Sun Don't Shine", as well as the top-25 single "Back in Your Own Backyard". With this success, Page earned the privilege of releasing her first LP, the self-titled "Patti Page" which opened with "Confess" and included other of her singles from this period. She also released a Christmas album in 1951; this was reissued five years later with updated cover art on a 12" LP with a few new tracks to fill the run time out.

=== "Tennessee Waltz": 1950 ===
The success of "Bolero" however was quickly eclipsed by what soon became Page's signature song. "Tennessee Waltz" was written in 1946 by Pee Wee King and Redd Stewart, and was recorded in 1947 by Pee Wee King and His Golden West Cowboys. Their original version made the country charts in 1948. The song was also a hit for Cowboy Copas around the same time. Page was introduced to the song by record producer Jerry Wexler, who suggested that she cover a recent R&B version by the Erskine Hawkins Orchestra. Page liked the song, and she recorded and released it as a single.

"Tennessee Waltz" became a blockbuster hit by complete accident—it was the B-side to "Boogie Woogie Santa Claus" which Mercury had intended to promote during the 1950 holiday season. The label intentionally put "Tennessee Waltz" on the disc to avoid drawing attention away from a planned Christmas hit, as they considered the song a throwaway with no hitmaking potential. To everyone's complete surprise, it went on to spend nine weeks at No. 1 during December 1950-January 1951, while "Boogie Woogie Santa Claus" failed to chart at all and was quickly forgotten. "Tennessee Waltz" also became Page's second single to appear on the country charts, becoming her biggest hit there, reaching number two. The song later became one of the best-selling records of its era, selling 7 million copies in the early 1950s. "Tennessee Waltz" remains the biggest commercial success for the overdubbing technique, pioneered by producer Mitch Miller, which enabled Page to harmonize with herself. (The technique was initiated by Jack Rael and Bill Putnam, as stated above.) "Tennessee Waltz" was the last song to sell one million copies of sheet music. The song was covered by several other singers during the next few months including Jo Stafford and Les Paul and Mary Ford.

The song was featured in the 1970 film Zabriskie Point and in the 1983 film The Right Stuff.

=== Breakthrough: 1951–1965 ===
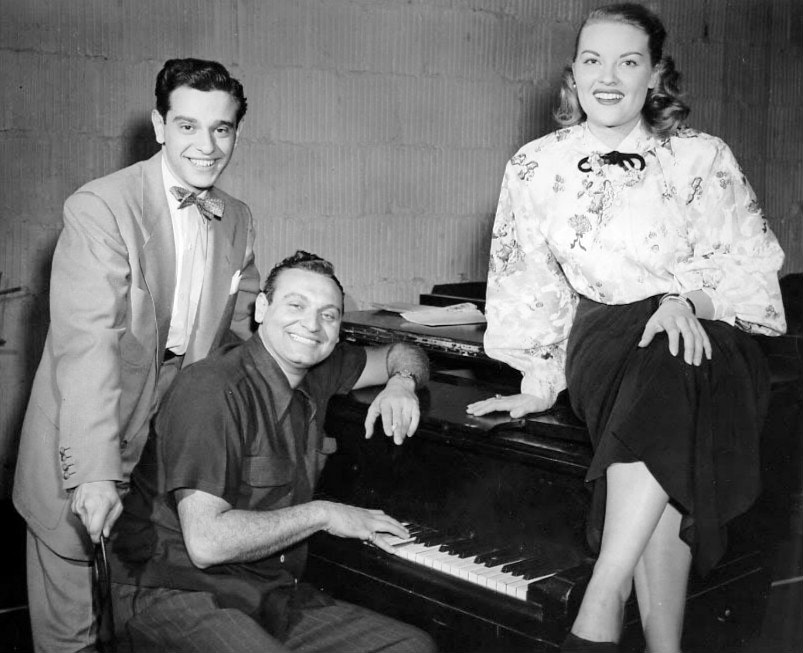
Page with Frankie Laine, c. 1950s

In 1951, Page covered "Would I Love You (Love You, Love You)", which had been a hit for Doris Day. Page's version was a top-five hit that sold 1 million copies. The next single, "Mockin' Bird Hill", (a cover of the original by Les Paul and Mary Ford) was her fourth million seller. Page had three more top 10 hits on Billboard in 1951, starting with "Mister and Mississippi", which peaked at number eight; "And So to Sleep Again"; and "Detour", which had been recorded and made famous by Spade Cooley, Foy Willing, and Elton Britt. Page's version was the most popular and became her seventh million-selling single. She also released her first studio album in 1951 titled Folk Song Favorites.

In 1952, Page had a third number-one hit with "I Went to Your Wedding", which spent two months at number one. Recorded in a country ballad style, the song was the B-side of "You Belong to Me", also a top-10 hit. "I Went to Your Wedding" was Page's eighth million-selling single in the United States. It displaced Jo Stafford's version of "You Belong to Me" at number one on Billboard's Best Seller chart. She had continued success that year, with three more songs in the top 10, "Come What May", "Once in a While", and "Why Don't You Believe Me".

In 1953, the novelty tune "(How Much Is That) Doggie in the Window?" became Page's fourth number-one hit, selling over 1 million copies and staying on the chart for five months. The song included the sound of a dog barking, which made it popular with a younger audience. It became one of her best-loved songs, but in later years would often be lampooned by rock critics and used to ridicule the state of popular music in the 1950s just prior to rock-and-roll. The song was written by novelty-tune specialist Bob Merrill. It was recorded by Page for the children's album Arfie Goes to School. It was also a UK hit and British singer Lita Roza performed a cover version that made the top 10 there. She had a series of top-20 hits that year. "Changing Partners", a final single, reached the top five, peaking at number three, and staying on the charts for five months. The song was also a country melody, like many of Page's hits at the time.

In 1954, Page had more chart hits, including "Cross Over the Bridge", which again overdubbed Page's vocals and peaked at number two. Other top-10 hits by Page that year included "Steam Heat" (from the Broadway musical The Pajama Game) and "Let Me Go, Lover!". In 1955, Page had one chart single: "Croce di Oro".

Unlike most other pop singers of her time, Page was able to maintain success into the rock-and-roll era. She had three hits in 1956, including the number-two "Allegheny Moon". In 1957, she had major hits with "A Poor Man's Roses (or a Rich Man's Gold)" (recorded the same year by Patsy Cline) and the top-five hit "Old Cape Cod".

"Old Cape Cod"
"Old Cape Cod" (1957). Page overdubbed her own vocals, illustrated by the tight harmonies in this sample.

In 1956, Vic Schoen became Patti Page's musical director, producing her on a long string of hits that included "Mama from the Train", "Allegheny Moon", "Old Cape Cod", "Belonging to Someone", and "Left Right Out of Your Heart". Page and Schoen's most challenging project was a recording of Gordon Jenkins narrative-tone poem as Manhattan Tower (recorded September 1956). The album was a success both artistically and commercially, reaching number 18 on the Billboard LP chart, the highest ranking of any of her albums. Schoen's arrangements were more lively and jazzy than the original Jenkins arrangements. Schoen recalled, "Patti was an alto, but I pushed her to reach notes higher than she had sung before for this album. We always enjoyed working together." Page and Schoen continued their collaboration for many years, working together until 1999.

During the 1950s, Page made regular TV appearances, including The Ed Sullivan Show, The Bob Hope Specials, The Steve Allen Show, and The Dean Martin Show. This eventually led to Page having television specials of her own. She later had her own series, beginning with Scott Music Hall in the 1952–53 season and a syndicated series for Oldsmobile in 1955, The Patti Page Show. However, this show only lasted one season, as did The Big Record (1957–58) and The Patti Page Olds Show, sponsored by Oldsmobile (1958–59). Page also began an acting career at this time, beginning with a role on Playhouse 90. Page made her movie debut in 1960 in Elmer Gantry. She also recorded the theme song for Boys Night Out, in which she played the part of Joanne McIllenny. In 1959, Page recorded the title song from the musical The Sound of Music for Mercury Records on the same day that the musical opened on Broadway. The song on her TV show The Patti Page Olds Show helped to promote the Broadway show.

The pop world was becoming less favorable to pre-rock singers by 1960 and it was also a weak time for the "established" ASCAP affiliate record labels such as Columbia, RCA, and Mercury, with indie and regional labels dominating pop during this era, so Page's chart hits dried up. She did not chart again until 1961 with "You'll Answer to Me" and "Mom and Dad's Waltz". Page's last major chart hit was "Hush...Hush, Sweet Charlotte" from the film of the same name starring Bette Davis and Olivia de Havilland. It peaked at number eight. It was her last top-10 hit (and her first since 1957) and was nominated for a "Best Song" Oscar. She performed it at the 1965 Academy Awards. She also recorded the song in Italian, Spanish, and German for foreign markets.

=== Adult contemporary and country music: 1966–1982 ===
Before releasing "Hush...Hush, Sweet Charlotte", Page signed with Columbia Records, where she remained until the end of the decade. She released a few studio albums for Columbia in the 1960s. In 1961, her singles began to chart on the Hot Adult Contemporary Tracks chart. Many of these singles became hits, peaking in the top 20, including cover versions of "You Can't Be True, Dear", "Gentle on My Mind", and "Little Green Apples" (the last being her final appearance on the Billboard). Page, who as an Oklahoma native was well-acquainted with country music, recorded many country songs over the years. Some of these were recorded for Columbia and were released as adult contemporary singles, including David Houston's "Almost Persuaded" and Tammy Wynette's "Stand by Your Man". Both of the songs charted for Page. With Page's viability on the pop charts diminishing as she got older and with a radically changed cultural climate in America during the late 1960s, she decided to focus solely on country recordings. In 1970 she left Columbia and came back to Mercury. In 1973, she returned to working with her former record producer Shelby Singleton.

Working for Mercury, Columbia, and Epic in the 1970s, Page recorded a series of country singles, beginning with 1970's "I Wish I Had a Mommy Like You", which became a top-25 hit, followed by "Give Him Love", which had similar success. In 1971, she released the country music album I'd Rather Be Sorry for Mercury records. In 1973, a duet with country singer Tom T. Hall titled "Hello, We're Lonely" was a top-20 hit, reaching number 14 on the Billboard country chart.

In 1973, Page returned to Columbia Records' affiliate Epic Records. In 1974 and 1975, she released singles for Avco Records, including "I May Not Be Lovin' You" and a cover of Hoyt Axton's "Less Than The Song", both of which were minor country hits. After a five-year hiatus, she recorded for Plantation Records in 1980. She had a top-40 hit with Plantation in 1981 titled "No Aces", followed by a series of minor country hits. In the early 1980s, she performed with major symphony orchestras in Cincinnati and Mexico City. .

=== Later career: 1983–2012 ===
In 1986, Page and arranger Vic Schoen reunited for a stage show in Las Vegas.

In 1988, Page appeared at the Ballroom in New York, marking the first time that she had performed there in nearly 20 years. She received positive reviews from music critics. In the 1990s, Page founded her own record label, C.A.F. Records, which released several records, including a 2003 children's album.

In the early 1990s, Page moved to San Diego, California, and continued to perform live shows at venues across the country.

In 1998, the album Live at Carnegie Hall: The 50th Anniversary Concert was released. The album won Page a Grammy Award the following year for Best Traditional Pop Vocal Performance, which, despite her prolific career, was her first Grammy.

In 1998, a sample of Patti Page's recording of "Old Cape Cod" formed the basis of Groove Armada's UK hit "At the River". The lines "If you're fond of sand dunes and salty air / Quaint little villages here and there..." sung in Page's multitracked close harmony, are repeated over and over, with the addition of synthesizer bass, slowed-down drums, and a bluesy trombone solo to produce a chill-out track. The success of this track introduced Page's music to another generation of listeners.

In 1999, Vic Schoen reunited with Page to record a CD for a Chinese label.

In 2000, she released the album Brand New Tennessee Waltz. Harmony vocals were provided by popular country stars, including Suzy Bogguss, Alison Krauss, Kathy Mattea, and Trisha Yearwood. The album was promoted at the Ryman Auditorium in Nashville, Tennessee, in 2000.

On October 4, 2001, Bob Baines, the mayor of Manchester, New Hampshire, declared the day "Patti Page Day" in the town. Miss Page was in Manchester to perform a sold-out concert at the Palace Theater to benefit Merrimack Valley Assistance Program.

In 2004, she appeared on the PBS Special Magic Moments: The Best of 50s Pop and sang "Tennessee Waltz" and "Old Cape Cod". The DVD includes a backstage interview with Page.

In 2005, she performed a series of engagements at a theatre in Branson, Missouri, starting on September 12.

Until shortly before her death, Page was the host of a weekly Sunday program on the Music of Your Life radio network. Jack White of the White Stripes and she were interviewed in January 2008 after the White Stripes had recorded Page's early 1950s hit "Conquest" on their 2007 studio album Icky Thump. Page and White were put together on the phone during the interview, talking to each other about their views on "Conquest".

Page sang "Summer Me, Winter Me" for Michel Legrand's 50th-anniversary concert at the MGM Grand, and on the recording, it is evident she had forgotten the words.

Page continued to tour actively until September 2012, when she announced on her web page her retirement from performing for health reasons.

== Style ==
During the time of Page's greatest popularity (the late 1940s and 1950s), most of her traditional pop music contemporaries included jazz melodies in their songs. Page also incorporated jazz into some of her songs; however, on most of her recordings, Page favored a country music arrangement.

During the late 1940s, when Page recorded for Mercury Records, its top A&R man was Mitch Miller, who, despite having left Mercury for Columbia Records in 1950, produced most of Page's music. Miller found that the simple-structured melodies and story lines in country songs could be adapted to the pop market. Page, who was born in Oklahoma, felt comfortable using this idea. Many of Page's more successful hits featured a country-music arrangement, including her signature song "Tennessee Waltz", as well as "I Went to Your Wedding" and "Changing Partners". Some of these singles charted on the Billboard country chart during the 1940s, '50s, and early '60s.

== Personal life ==
Page was married three times, first to University of Wisconsin student Jack Skiba in May 1948. They moved to New York, but she asked for and received a no-fault divorce in Wisconsin within a year. Her next marriage was to Charles O'Curran, a choreographer, in 1956. O'Curran had been married to actress Betty Hutton. Page and O'Curran adopted a son, Danny, and a daughter, Kathleen. They divorced in 1972.

Page's last marriage was to Jerry Filiciotto in 1990. The couple owned a maple syrup business named The Farm at Woods Hill in Bath, New Hampshire, and resided in Solana Beach, California. Filiciotto died on April 18, 2009.

In his autobiography Lucky Me, published in 2011, former baseball player and front-office executive Eddie Robinson claims he dated Page before her second marriage.

Page's longtime collaborator arranger Vic Schoen once recalled, "She was one of the nicest and most accommodating singers I've ever worked with." Schoen and she remained close friends and spoke regularly until his death in 2000.

== Death ==
Page died on January 1, 2013, at the Seacrest Village Retirement Community in Encinitas, California, at the age of 85; she had been suffering from heart and lung disease. She was buried at El Camino Memorial Park in San Diego.

== Discography ==
Studio albums

- Patti Page (1950)
- Folk Song Favorites (1951)
- Christmas with Patti Page (1951)
- Tennessee Waltz (1952)
- Patti Page Sings for Romance (1954)
- Song Souvenir (1954)
- Just Patti (1954)
- Patti's Songs (1954)
- So Many Memories (1954)
- And I Thought About You (1955)
- Romance on the Range (1955)
- Manhattan Tower (1956)
- In the Land of Hi-Fi (1956)
- Music for Two in Love (1956)
- You Go to My Head (1956)
- The Voices of Patti Page (1956)
- The East Side (1957)
- The Waltz Queen (1957)
- I've Heard That Song Before (1958)
- Let's Get Away from It All (1958)
- The West Side (1959)
- On Camera...Patti Page...Favorites from TV (1959)
- Indiscretion (1959)
- I'll Remember April (1959)
- 3 Little Words (1959)
- Just a Closer Walk with Thee (1960)
- Patti Page Sings the Stars in "Elmer Gantry" (1960)
- Patti Page Sings Country & Western Golden Hits (1961)
- Go On Home (1962)
- Patti Page Sings Golden Hits of the Boys (1962)
- Say Wonderful Things (1963)
- Love After Midnight (1964)
- Hush, Hush, Sweet Charlotte (1965)
- Christmas with Patti Page (1965)
- Patti Page Sings America's Favorite Hymns (1966)
- Patti Page's Greatest Hits (1966)
- Today My Way (1967)
- Gentle on My Mind (1968)
- Honey Come Back (1970)
- I'd Rather Be Sorry (1971)
- A Touch of Country (1979)
- No Aces (1981)
- Golden Hits Volume 1 (1981)
- Golden Hits Volume 2 (1982)
- Brand New Tennessee Waltz (2000)
- Sweet Sounds of Christmas (2002)
- Best Country Songs (2008)

== Partial filmography ==
Television

- Patti Page's Music Hall CBS 1952-1953
- The Patti Page Show (syndicated by Screen Gems), 1955–56, 78 15-minute episodes which were edited into 31 half-hour episodes.
- The Big Record Show CBS 1957-1958
- The Patti Page Oldsmobile Show ABC 1958-1959
- What's My Line? (CBS, September 22, 1957) (Episode No. 381) (Season 9, Ep 4) Mystery Guest
- Appointment with Adventure ("Paris Venture", CBS, February 26, 1956)
- The United States Steel Hour ("Upbeat", CBS, 1957)

Film

- Elmer Gantry (1960) as Sister Rachel
- Dondi (1961) as Liz
- Blue Hawaii (1961) as Woman Paddling Canoe Near Hotel (uncredited)
- Boys' Night Out (1962) as Joanne McIllenny
- 2004: The Patti Page Video Songbook
- 2004: Patti Page – Sings the Hits
- 2005: In Concert Series: Patti Page

== See also ==
- List of the best-selling music artists
- List of popular music performers

== Bibliography ==
- Once Upon a Dream: A Personal Chat with All Teenagers (1960)
- This Is My Song: A Memoir – Patti Page with Skip Press (2009)
