= List of Billboard Hot 100 top-ten singles in 1960 =

Year-restricted popular song list

This is a list of singles that have spent time in the top ten of the Billboard Hot 100 during 1960, presented chronologically from the year's first top-ten list from the issue dated January 4, 1960, to each song's entry date through the final published issue of the year.

Connie Francis scored five top ten hits during the year with "Mama", "Everybody's Somebody's Fool", "My Heart Has a Mind of Its Own", "Many Tears Ago", and "Among My Souvenirs", the most among all other artists.

== Top-ten singles ==
| Top ten entry date | Single | Artist(s) | Peak | Peak date | Weeks in top ten |
Singles from 1959
| December 21 | "El Paso" | Marty Robbins | 1 | January 4 | 9 |
| December 21 | "Way Down Yonder in New Orleans" | Freddy Cannon | 3 | January 11 | 7 |
| December 28 | "Pretty Blue Eyes" | Steve Lawrence | 9 | January 4 | 6 |
Singles from 1960
| January 4 | "Running Bear" | Johnny Preston | 1 | January 18 | 10 |
| January 4 | "Go, Jimmy, Go" | Jimmy Clanton | 5 | February 1 | 5 |
| January 18 | "The Village of St. Bernadette" | Andy Williams | 7 | January 25 | 2 |
| January 18 | "Teen Angel" | Mark Dinning | 1 | February 8 | 10 |
| January 25 | "Where or When" | Dion and the Belmonts | 3 | February 8 | 5 |
| February 1 | "Handy Man" | Jimmy Jones | 2 | February 29 | 9 |
| February 8 | "Lonely Blue Boy" | Conway Twitty | 6 | February 8 | 3 |
| February 8 | "What in the World's Come Over You" | Jack Scott | 5 | February 22 | 7 |
| February 8 | "He'll Have to Go" | Jim Reeves | 2 | March 7 | 12 |
| February 8 | "You Got What It Takes" | Marv Johnson | 10 | February 8 | 1 |
| February 15 | "Theme from A Summer Place" | Percy Faith | 1 | February 22 | 12 |
| February 15 | "Let It Be Me" | The Everly Brothers | 7 | February 22 | 4 |
| February 22 | "Beyond the Sea" | Bobby Darin | 6 | February 29 | 4 |
| February 29 | "Wild One" | Bobby Rydell | 2 | March 28 | 8 |
| February 29 | "Baby (You've Got What It Takes)" | Dinah Washington and Brook Benton | 5 | March 21 | 6 |
| March 14 | "Harbor Lights" | The Platters | 8 | March 28 | 4 |
| March 14 | "Puppy Love" | Paul Anka | 2 | April 4 | 7 |
| March 21 | "Sweet Nothin's" | Brenda Lee | 4 | April 18 | 7 |
| March 28 | "O, Dio Mio" | Annette | 10 | March 28 | 1 |
| March 28 | "Forever" | The Little Dippers | 9 | March 28 | 1 |
| April 4 | "Sink the Bismarck" | Johnny Horton | 3 | April 25 | 7 |
| April 4 | "Footsteps" | Steve Lawrence | 7 | April 4 | 2 |
| April 4 | "Mama" | Connie Francis | 8 | April 11 | 3 |
| April 11 | "Greenfields" | The Brothers Four | 2 | April 18 | 9 |
| April 11 | "I Love the Way You Love" | Marv Johnson | 9 | April 11 | 1 |
| April 18 | "Stuck on You" | Elvis Presley | 1 | April 25 | 10 |
| April 18 | "Sixteen Reasons" | Connie Stevens | 3 | May 2 | 7 |
| April 25 | "The Old Lamplighter" | The Browns | 5 | May 2 | 3 |
| April 25 | "White Silver Sands" | Bill Black's Combo | 9 | April 25 | 1 |
| May 2 | "Night" | Jackie Wilson | 4 | May 9 | 6 |
| May 2 | "Cradle of Love" | Johnny Preston | 7 | May 2 | 5 |
| May 2 | "Let the Little Girl Dance" | Billy Bland | 7 | May 16 | 4 |
| May 9 | "Stairway to Heaven" | Neil Sedaka | 9 | May 9 | 1 |
| May 9 | "Cathy's Clown" | The Everly Brothers | 1 | May 23 | 9 |
| May 16 | "Good Timin'" | Jimmy Jones | 3 | May 23 | 7 |
| May 16 | "He'll Have to Stay" | Jeanne Black | 4 | May 30 | 6 |
| May 23 | "Paper Roses" | Anita Bryant | 5 | June 13 | 6 |
| May 30 | "Burning Bridges" | Jack Scott | 3 | June 13 | 6 |
| June 6 | "Everybody's Somebody's Fool" | Connie Francis | 1 | June 27 | 8 |
| June 6 | "Love You So" | Ron Holden | 7 | June 13 | 3 |
| June 13 | "Swingin' School" | Bobby Rydell | 5 | June 20 | 3 |
| June 13 | "Happy-Go-Lucky Me" | Paul Evans | 10 | June 13 | 1 |
| June 20 | "Alley Oop" | The Hollywood Argyles | 1 | July 11 | 8 |
| June 27 | "Because They're Young" | Duane Eddy | 4 | July 4 | 4 |
| June 27 | "I'm Sorry" | Brenda Lee | 1 | July 18 | 11 |
| June 27 | "A Rockin' Good Way" | Dinah Washington and Brook Benton | 7 | June 27 | 3 |
| July 4 | "That's All You Gotta Do" | Brenda Lee | 6 | July 4 | 5 |
| July 4 | "My Home Town" | Paul Anka | 8 | July 4 | 2 |
| July 4 | "Mule Skinner Blues" | The Fendermen | 5 | July 11 | 5 |
| July 11 | "Only the Lonely" | Roy Orbison | 2 | July 25 | 8 |
| July 11 | "When Will I Be Loved" | The Everly Brothers | 8 | July 18 | 2 |
| July 18 | "Tell Laura I Love Her" | Ray Peterson | 7 | August 1 | 5 |
| July 18 | "Itsy Bitsy Teenie Weenie Yellow Polka Dot Bikini" | Brian Hyland | 1 | August 8 | 8 |
| July 25 | "Image of a Girl" | The Safaris | 6 | August 1 | 5 |
| July 25 | "Please Help Me, I'm Falling" | Hank Locklin | 8 | August 1 | 3 |
| August 1 | "It's Now or Never" | Elvis Presley | 1 | August 15 | 11 |
| August 8 | "Walk, Don't Run" | The Ventures | 2 | August 29 | 9 |
| August 8 | "Walkin' to New Orleans" | Fats Domino | 6 | August 15 | 2 |
| August 15 | "Finger Poppin' Time" | Hank Ballard & The Midnighters | 7 | August 15 | 4 |
| August 15 | "The Twist" | Chubby Checker | 1 | September 19 | 12 |
| August 22 | "Volare" | Bobby Rydell | 4 | September 5 | 5 |
| August 22 | "Mission Bell" | Donnie Brooks | 7 | September 5 | 4 |
| August 29 | "In My Little Corner of the World" | Anita Bryant | 10 | August 29 | 1 |
| September 5 | "My Heart Has a Mind of Its Own" | Connie Francis | 1 | September 26 | 10 |
| September 5 | "Theme from The Apartment" | Ferrante & Teicher | 10 | September 5 | 3 |
| September 12 | "Mr. Custer" | Larry Verne | 1 | October 10 | 7 |
| September 12 | "Chain Gang" | Sam Cooke | 2 | October 3 | 8 |
| September 12 | "Kiddio" | Brook Benton | 7 | September 19 | 4 |
| September 12 | "Yogi" | The Ivy Three | 8 | September 19 | 2 |
| September 19 | "A Million to One" | Jimmy Charles | 5 | September 26 | 5 |
| September 26 | "So Sad (To Watch Good Love Go Bad)" | The Everly Brothers | 7 | October 10 | 5 |
| September 26 | "Save the Last Dance for Me" | The Drifters | 1 | October 17 | 9 |
| October 10 | "Devil or Angel" | Bobby Vee | 6 | October 17 | 5 |
| October 10 | "I Want to Be Wanted" | Brenda Lee | 1 | October 24 | 6 |
| October 24 | "Let's Think About Living" | Bob Luman | 7 | October 24 | 2 |
| October 31 | "You Talk Too Much" | Joe Jones | 3 | November 14 | 4 |
| October 31 | "Poetry in Motion" | Johnny Tillotson | 2 | November 14 | 7 |
| October 31 | "Georgia on My Mind" | Ray Charles | 1 | November 14 | 5 |
| November 7 | "Stay" | Maurice Williams & the Zodiacs | 1 | November 21 | 5 |
| November 7 | "Let's Go, Let's Go, Let's Go" | Hank Ballard & the Midnighters | 6 | November 21 | 5 |
| November 7 | "Blue Angel" | Roy Orbison | 9 | November 7 | 2 |
| November 14 | "Last Date" | Floyd Cramer | 2 | November 28 | 10 |
| November 14 | "A Thousand Stars" | Kathy Young with the Innocents | 3 | December 12 | 8 |
| November 21 | "Are You Lonesome Tonight?" | Elvis Presley | 1 | November 28 | 11 |
| November 21 | "New Orleans" | U.S. Bonds | 6 | November 28 | 3 |
| November 28 | "North to Alaska" | Johnny Horton | 4 | December 19 | 8 |
| November 28 | "Alone at Last" | Jackie Wilson | 8 | November 28 | 1 |
| December 5 | "He Will Break Your Heart" | Jerry Butler | 7 | December 5 | 3 |
| December 5 | "Sailor" | Lolita | 5 | December 19 | 4 |
| December 12 | "Many Tears Ago" | Connie Francis | 7 | December 26 | 4 |
| December 19 | "You're Sixteen" | Johnny Burnette | 8 | December 26 | 4 |

=== 1959 peaks ===
List of Billboard Hot 100 top ten singles in 1960 which peaked in 1959
| Top ten entry date | Single | Artist(s) | Peak | Peak date | Weeks in top ten |
|---|---|---|---|---|---|
| November 9 | "Heartaches by the Number" | Guy Mitchell | 1 | December 14 | 10 |
| December 14 | "Why" | Frankie Avalon | 1 | December 28 | 9 |
| December 14 | "The Big Hurt" | Miss Toni Fisher | 3 | December 28 | 8 |
| December 14 | "It's Time to Cry" | Paul Anka | 4 | December 28 | 5 |
| December 21 | "Among My Souvenirs" | Connie Francis | 7 | December 28 | 5 |

=== 1961 peaks ===
List of Billboard Hot 100 top ten singles in 1960 which peaked in 1961
| Top ten entry date | Single | Artist(s) | Peak | Peak date | Weeks in top ten |
|---|---|---|---|---|---|
| December 12 | "Wonderland by Night" | Bert Kaempfert | 1 | January 9 | 10 |
| December 12 | "Exodus" | Ferrante & Teicher | 2 | January 23 | 11 |
| December 26 | "Corrina, Corinna" | Ray Peterson | 9 | January 9 | 5 |
| December 31 | "Angel Baby" | Rosie and the Originals | 5 | January 23 | 7 |

== See also ==
- 1960 in music
- List of Billboard Hot 100 number ones of 1960
- Billboard Year-End Hot 100 singles of 1960
