= Billboard Year-End Hot 100 singles of 1960 =

Ranking of recorded music

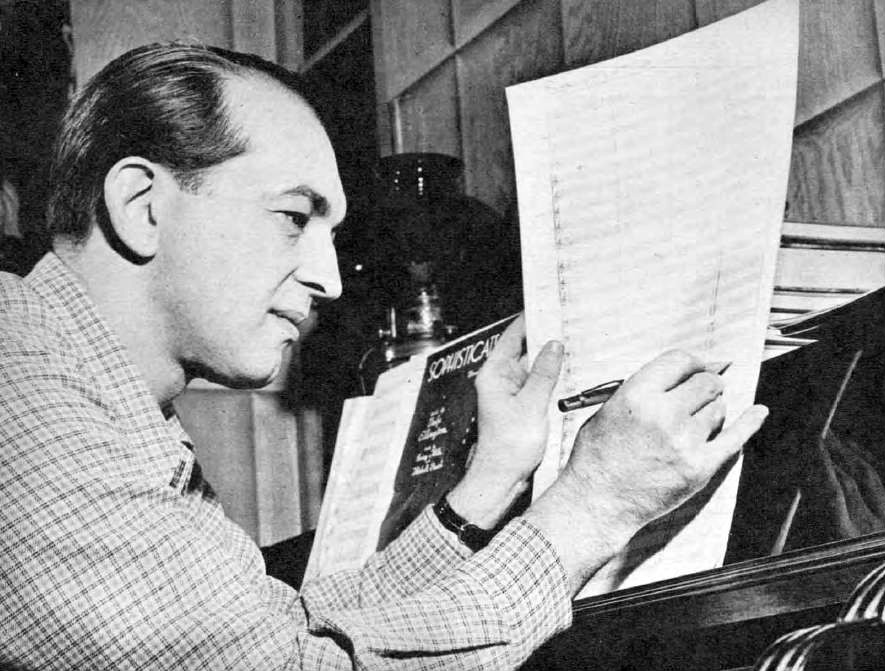
"Theme from A Summer Place" by Percy Faith was the number one song of 1960.

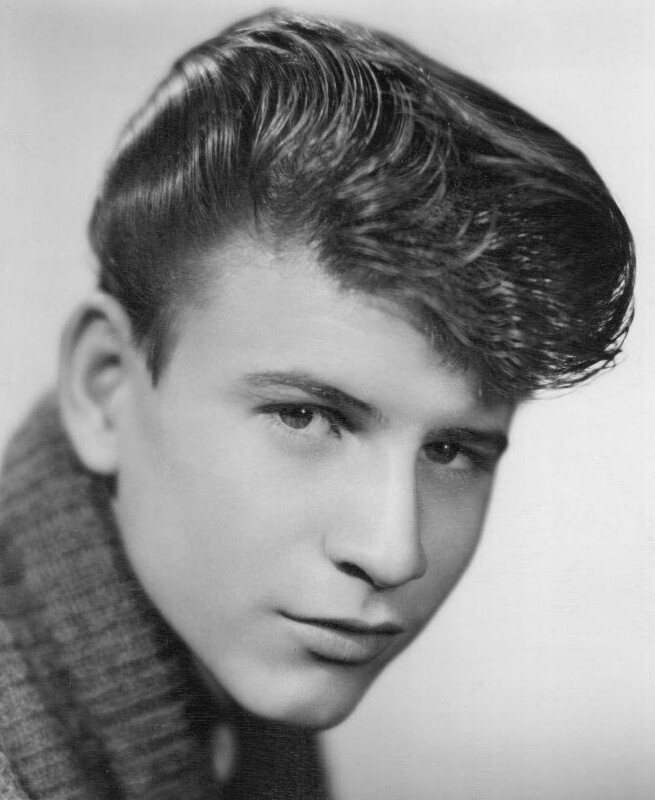
Bobby Rydell had four songs on the Year-End Hot 100.

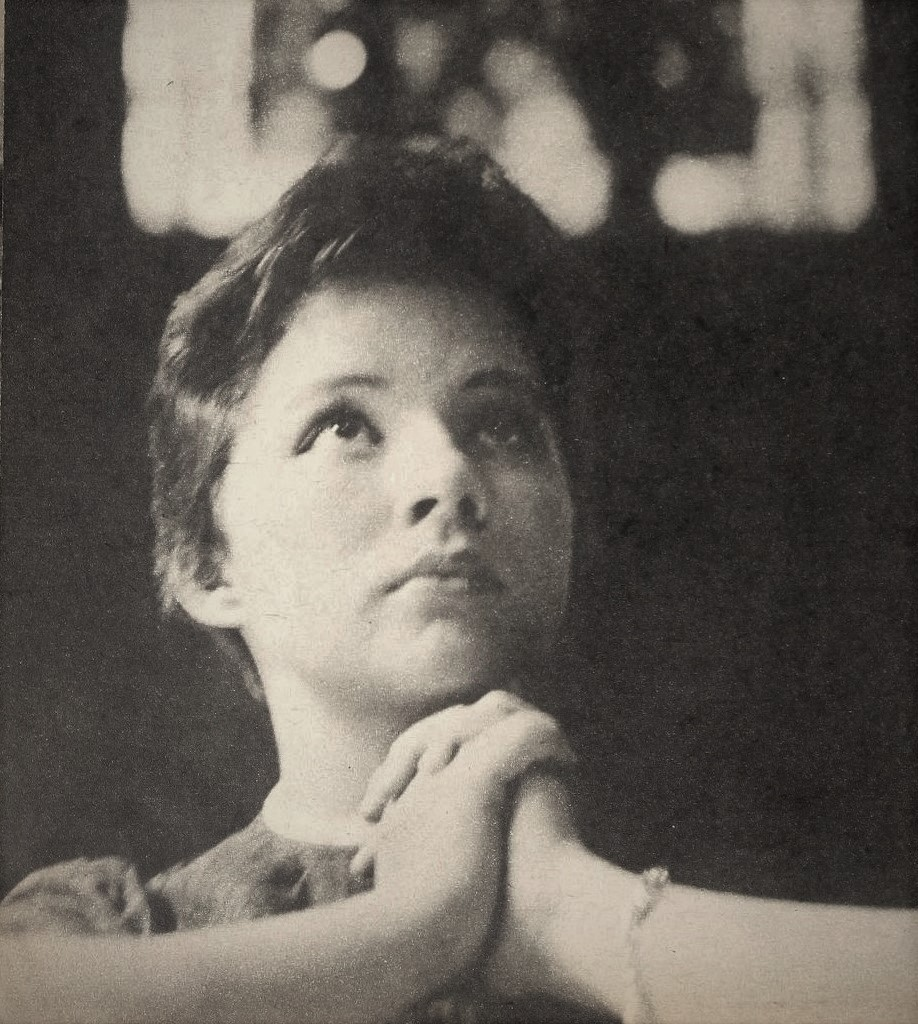
Brenda Lee had four songs on the Year-End Hot 100.

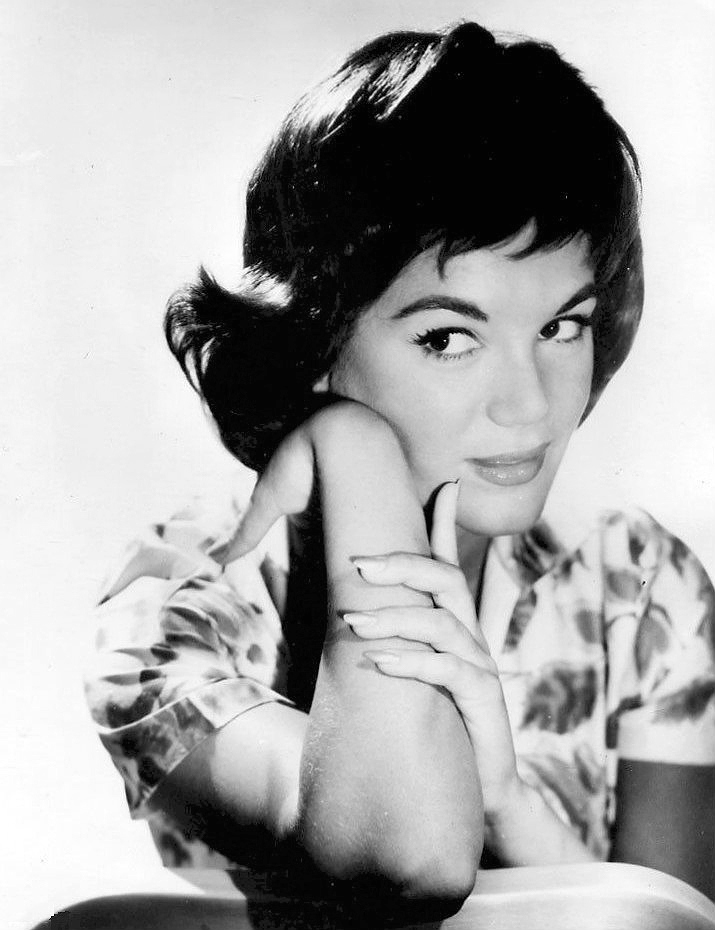
Connie Francis had four songs on the Year-End Hot 100.

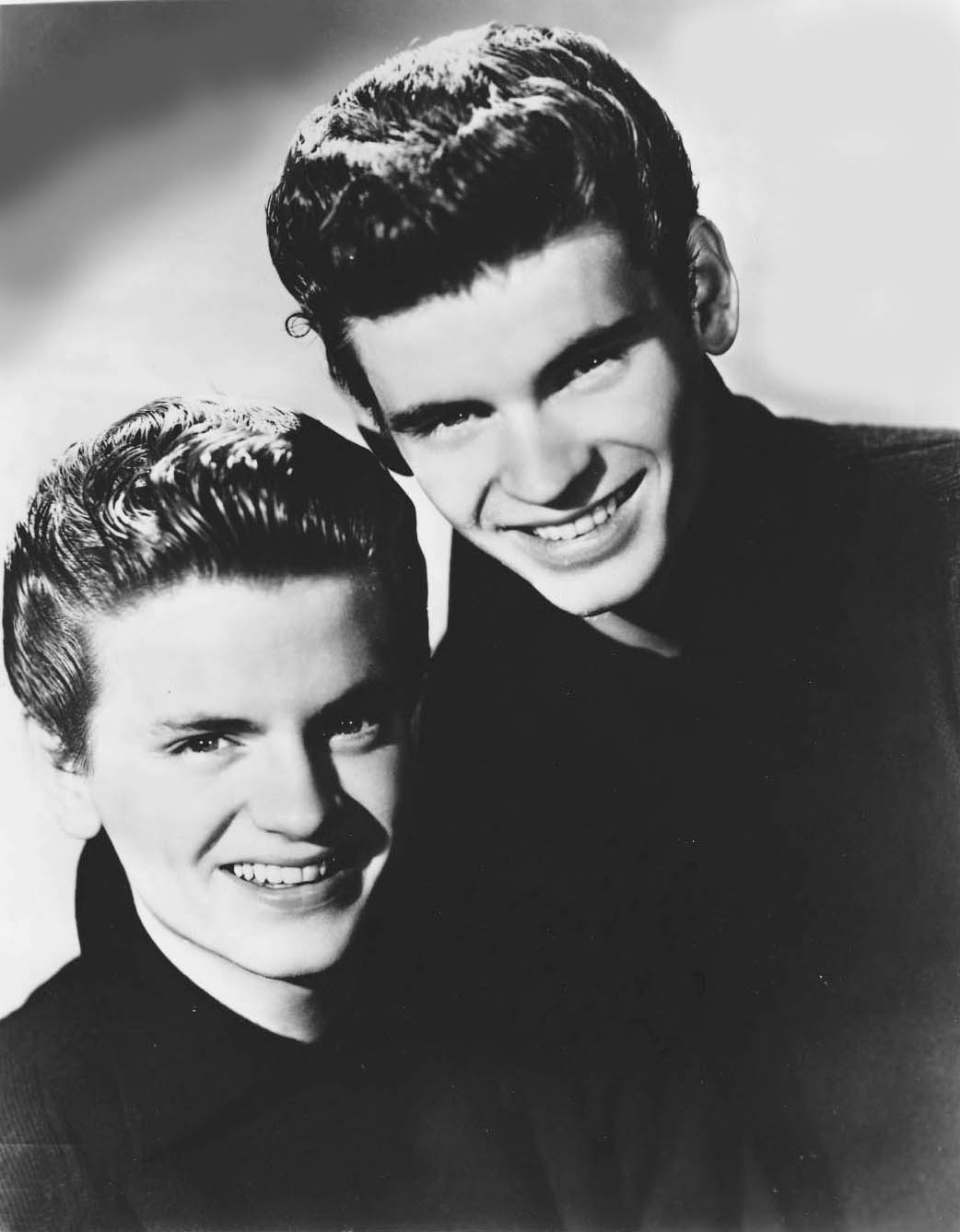
The Everly Brothers had four songs on the Year-End Hot 100.

This is a list of Billboard magazine's Top Hot 100 songs of 1960.

| No. | Title | Artist(s) |
|---|---|---|
| 1 | "Theme from A Summer Place" | Percy Faith |
| 2 | "He'll Have to Go" | Jim Reeves |
| 3 | "Cathy's Clown" | The Everly Brothers |
| 4 | "Running Bear" | Johnny Preston |
| 5 | "Teen Angel" | Mark Dinning |
| 6 | "I'm Sorry" | Brenda Lee |
| 7 | "It's Now or Never" | Elvis Presley |
| 8 | "Handy Man" | Jimmy Jones |
| 9 | "Stuck on You" | Elvis Presley |
| 10 | "The Twist" | Chubby Checker |
| 11 | "Everybody's Somebody's Fool" | Connie Francis |
| 12 | "Wild One" | Bobby Rydell |
| 13 | "Greenfields" | The Brothers Four |
| 14 | "What in the World's Come Over You" | Jack Scott |
| 15 | "El Paso" | Marty Robbins |
| 16 | "Alley Oop" | The Hollywood Argyles |
| 17 | "My Heart Has a Mind of Its Own" | Connie Francis |
| 18 | "Sweet Nothin's" | Brenda Lee |
| 19 | "Itsy Bitsy Teenie Weenie Yellow Polkadot Bikini" | Brian Hyland |
| 20 | "Only the Lonely" | Roy Orbison |
| 21 | "Where or When" | Dion and the Belmonts |
| 22 | "Sixteen Reasons" | Connie Stevens |
| 23 | "Puppy Love" | Paul Anka |
| 24 | "Why" | Frankie Avalon |
| 25 | "Walk, Don't Run" | The Ventures |
| 26 | "Save the Last Dance for Me" | The Drifters |
| 27 | "Baby (You've Got What It Takes)" | Dinah Washington & Brook Benton |
| 28 | "Sink the Bismarck" | Johnny Horton |
| 29 | "Chain Gang" | Sam Cooke |
| 30 | "Let It Be Me" | The Everly Brothers |
| 31 | "Good Timin'" | Jimmy Jones |
| 32 | "Beyond the Sea" | Bobby Darin |
| 33 | "Go, Jimmy, Go" | Jimmy Clanton |
| 34 | "Night" | Jackie Wilson |
| 35 | "Burning Bridges" | Jack Scott |
| 36 | "The Big Hurt" | Toni Fisher |
| 37 | "Because They're Young" | Duane Eddy |
| 38 | "Lonely Blue Boy" | Conway Twitty |
| 39 | "Pretty Blue Eyes" | Steve Lawrence |
| 40 | "Way Down Yonder in New Orleans" | Freddy Cannon |
| 41 | "Paper Roses" | Anita Bryant |
| 42 | "Mr. Custer" | Larry Verne |
| 43 | "I Want to Be Wanted" | Brenda Lee |
| 44 | "Mule Skinner Blues" | The Fendermen |
| 45 | "Cradle of Love" | Johnny Preston |
| 46 | "You Got What It Takes" | Marv Johnson |
| 47 | "Please Help Me, I'm Falling" | Hank Locklin |
| 48 | "Love You So" | Ron Holden |
| 49 | "Finger Poppin' Time" | Hank Ballard & The Midnighters |
| 50 | "Harbor Lights" | The Platters |
| 51 | "Let the Little Girl Dance" | Billy Bland |
| 52 | "He'll Have to Stay" | Jeanne Black |
| 53 | "Theme from The Apartment" | Ferrante & Teicher |
| 54 | "Volare" | Bobby Rydell |
| 55 | "A Million to One" | Jimmy Charles |
| 56 | "The Village of St. Bernadette" | Andy Williams |
| 57 | "White Silver Sands" | Bill Black's Combo |
| 58 | "The Old Lamp-Lighter" | The Browns |
| 59 | "Devil or Angel" | Bobby Vee |
| 60 | "Down by the Station" | The Four Preps |
| 61 | "Forever" | The Little Dippers |
| 62 | "Image of a Girl" | The Safaris & The Phantom's Band |
| 63 | "Kiddio" | Brook Benton |
| 64 | "Mission Bell" | Donnie Brooks |
| 65 | "I Love the Way You Love" | Marv Johnson |
| 66 | "It's Time to Cry" | Paul Anka |
| 67 | "Tell Laura I Love Her" | Ray Peterson |
| 68 | "Mama" | Connie Francis |
| 69 | "Footsteps" | Steve Lawrence |
| 70 | "So Sad" | The Everly Brothers |
| 71 | "That's All You Gotta Do" | Brenda Lee |
| 72 | "Walking to New Orleans" | Fats Domino |
| 73 | "Among My Souvenirs" | Connie Francis |
| 74 | "Swingin' School" | Bobby Rydell |
| 75 | "A Rockin' Good Way (to Mess Around and Fall in Love)" | Dinah Washington & Brook Benton |
| 76 | "Stairway to Heaven" | Neil Sedaka |
| 77 | "My Home Town" | Paul Anka |
| 78 | "Georgia on My Mind" | Ray Charles |
| 79 | "Cherry Pie" | Skip & Flip |
| 80 | "Wonderful World" | Sam Cooke |
| 81 | "Tracy's Theme" | Robert Mersey |
| 82 | "Lady Luck" | Lloyd Price |
| 83 | "Step by Step" | The Crests |
| 84 | "Happy-Go-Lucky Me" | Paul Evans |
| 85 | "Young Emotions" | Ricky Nelson |
| 86 | "Dreamin'" | Johnny Burnette |
| 87 | "Poetry in Motion" | Johnny Tillotson |
| 88 | "O Dio Mio" | Annette Funicello |
| 89 | "You Talk Too Much" | Joe Jones |
| 90 | "Beatnik Fly" | Johnny and the Hurricanes |
| 91 | "When Will I Be Loved" | The Everly Brothers |
| 92 | "Let's Think About Living" | Bob Luman |
| 93 | "Heartaches by the Number" | Guy Mitchell |
| 94 | "My Little Corner of the World" | Anita Bryant |
| 95 | "Doggin' Around" | Jackie Wilson |
| 96 | "Little Bitty Girl" | Bobby Rydell |
| 97 | "Money (That's What I Want)" | Barrett Strong |
| 98 | "Stay" | Maurice Williams and the Zodiacs |
| 99 | "Lonely Weekends" | Charlie Rich |
| 100 | "Sandy" | Larry Hall |

== See also ==
- 1960 in music
- List of Billboard Hot 100 number-one singles of 1960
- List of Billboard Hot 100 top-ten singles in 1960
