= Dinning =

Dinning is the surname of the following people:

- Dean Dinning (b. 1967), American musician and music producer
- Jim Dinning (born 1952), Canadian politician and businessman
- Mark Dinning (1933–1986), American pop music singer
- Tony Dinning (born 1975), English football midfielder
- American singing trio The Dinning Sisters: Ella (1920–2000), Virginia (1924–2013) and Jean Dinning (1924–2011)
