= List of Billboard Hot 100 number ones of 1960 =

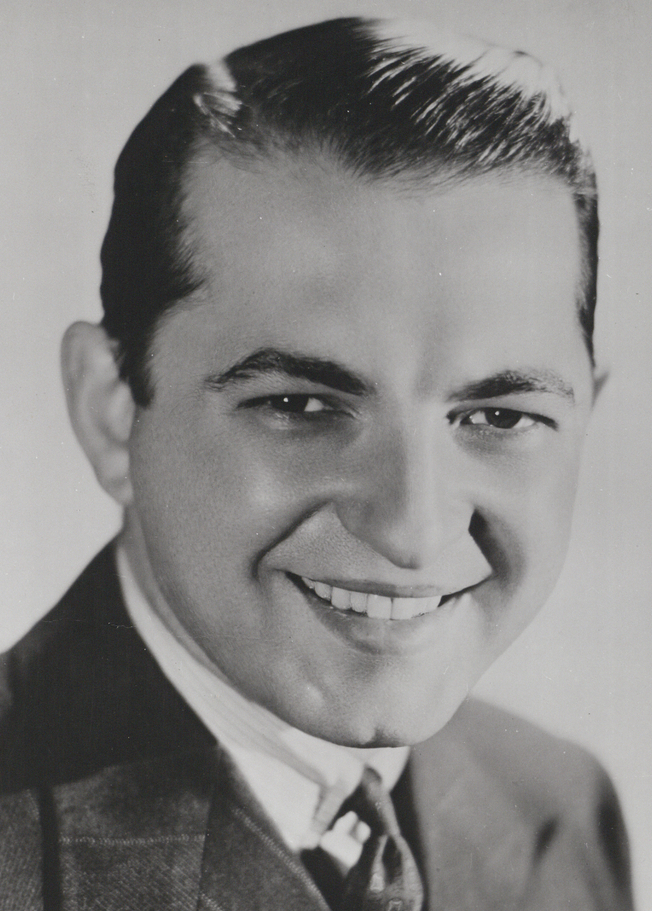
Percy Faith had the longest-running Hot 100 number one of 1960.

The Billboard Hot 100 is a chart published since August 1958 by Billboard magazine which ranks the best-performing singles in the United States. In 1960, it was compiled based on a combination of sales and airplay data sourced from surveys of retail outlets and playlists submitted by radio stations respectively. During the year, 19 different singles spent time at number one.

In the year's first issue of Billboard, Marty Robbins moved into the number-one position with "El Paso", displacing the final chart-topper of 1959, "Why" by Frankie Avalon. It was Robbins' only number one on the Hot 100; his final top 40 entry came in 1962, but he continued to be achieve success on Billboard's country music charts, with 17 number-one singles between 1952 and 1976. The next two artists to top the Hot 100, Johnny Preston and Mark Dinning, both had brief chart careers; "Teen Angel" was Dinning's only top 40 entry. In February, Percy Faith and his orchestra reached number one with "Theme from A Summer Place", from the film A Summer Place. The instrumental topped the chart for nine consecutive weeks, the year's longest run at number one and the longest unbroken run in the top spot since the launch of the Hot 100 in 1958. It was displaced from the top spot by "Stuck on You" by Elvis Presley; of the 15 acts that reached number one during 1960, only Presley had previously topped the Hot 100, although Faith and the Everly Brothers had both reached number one on the separate sales, airplay, and jukebox play charts that Billboard had published prior to the launch of the consolidated listing in 1958. "Stuck on You" was Presley's first new recording since the end of a two-year stint in the United States Army; although he had continued to chart with songs recorded before he entered the army, demand was high for his first newly recorded single since 1958.

Presley returned to number one in August with "It's Now or Never", which spent five weeks in the top spot; the single is reportedly the best-selling of his career, having sold 25 million copies worldwide. Presley, known as the "King of Rock and Roll", gained his third number one of the year in November with "Are You Lonesome Tonight?", which held the top spot for the final five weeks of 1960. He was the only act to take three singles to number one during the year, and his total of 14 weeks in the top spot was the most achieved by any act. Two female singers, Connie Francis and Brenda Lee, were the only other acts to have more than one number one during 1960. Francis topped the Hot 100 in June with "Everybody's Somebody's Fool" and in September with "My Heart Has a Mind of Its Own". Lee, who was 15 years old at the time, reached number one with "I'm Sorry" in July and "I Want to Be Wanted" in October. More than 60 years later, she set a record for the oldest singer to top the Hot 100 when her 1958 recording of "Rockin' Around the Christmas Tree" reached number one in 2023 when she was 78 years old. Acts that reached number one in the second half of the year but had short-lived success included the Hollywood Argyles, a studio project organized by the singer Gary Paxton; the novelty song "Alley Oop" was the only song under the Hollywood Argyles name ever to chart on the Hot 100.

== Chart history ==
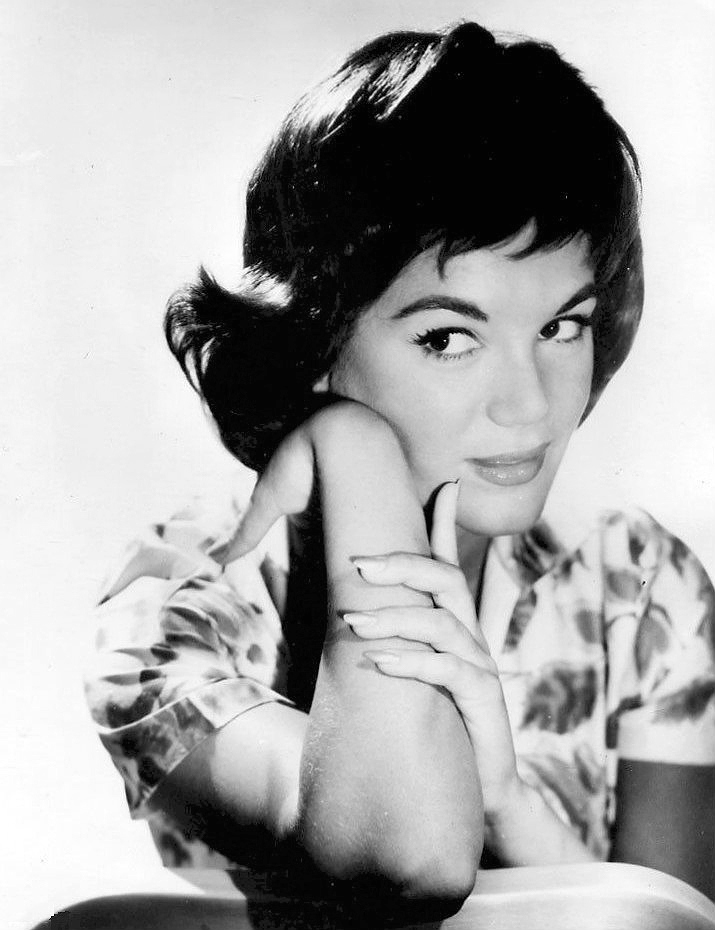
Connie Francis had two number ones in 1960.

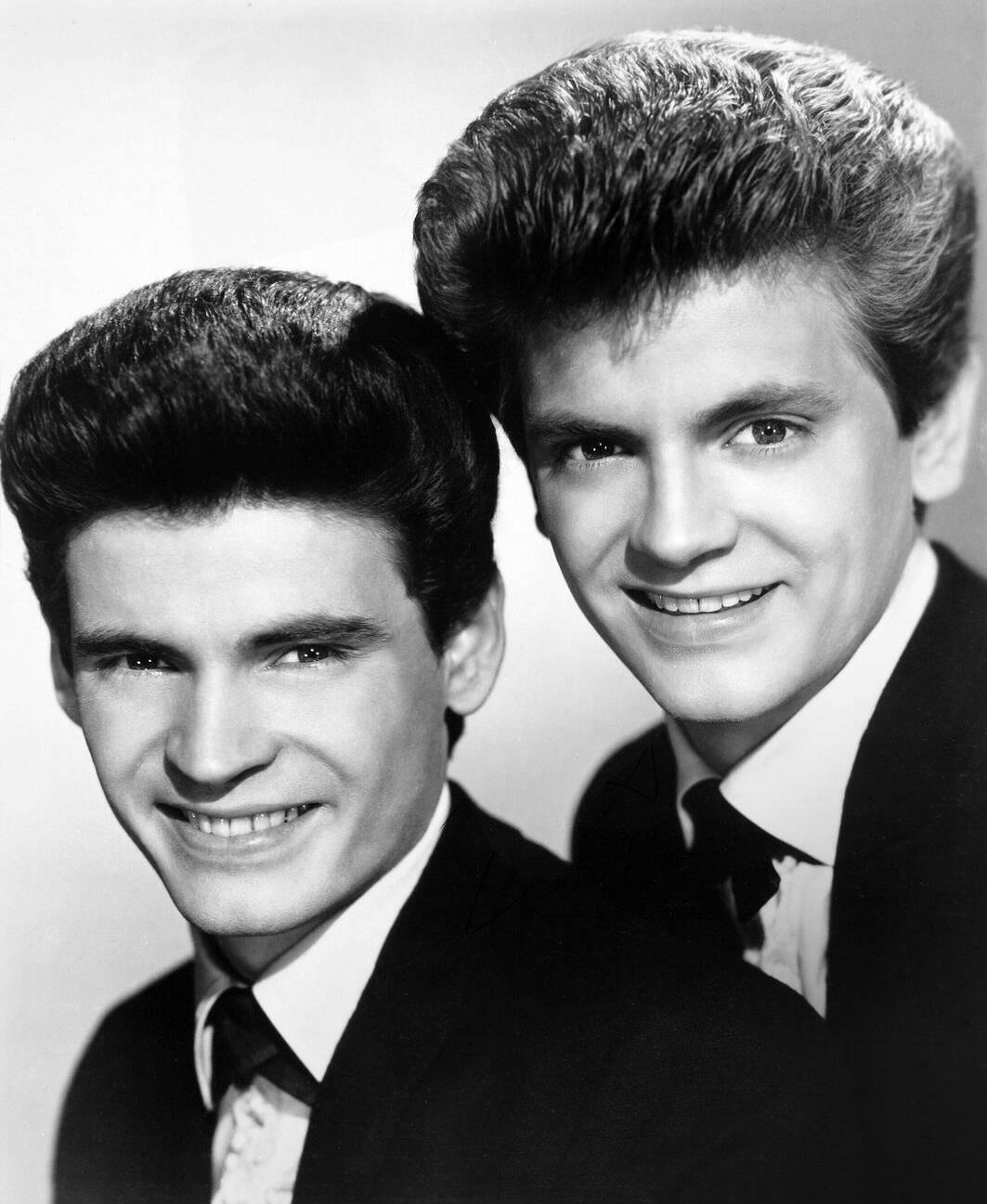
The Everly Brothers took "Cathy's Clown" to number one.

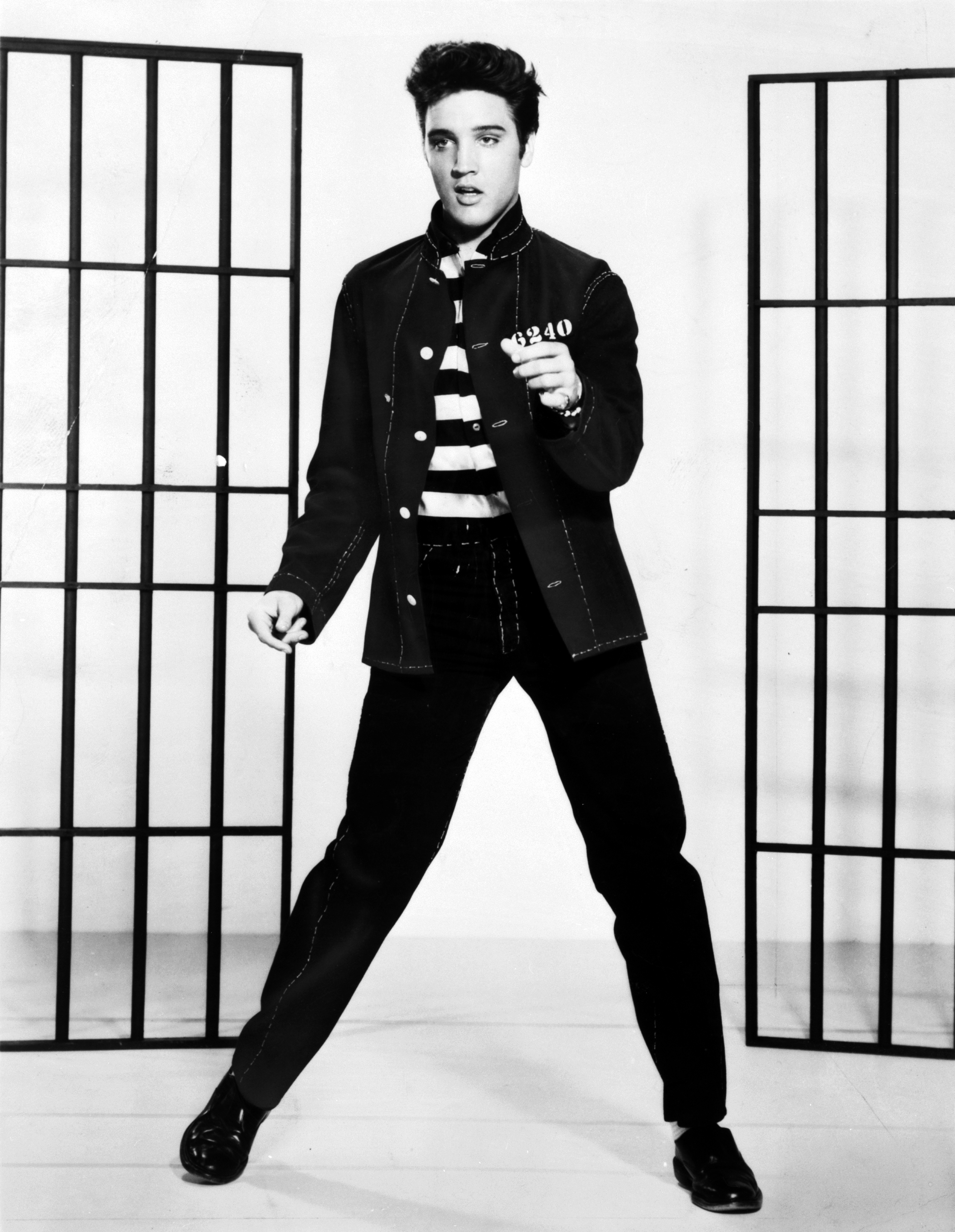
Elvis Presley had three chart-toppers in 1960.

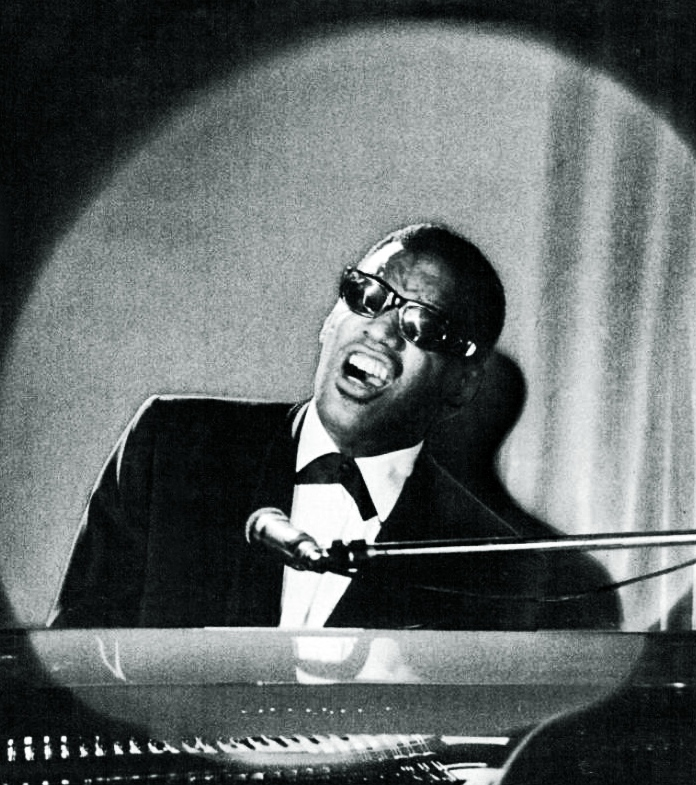
"Georgia on my Mind" was a number one for Ray Charles.

Chart history
No. (Note: The "No." column indicates the numerical sequence of number ones in Hot 100 history. "Re" indicates a single returning to number one.)	Issue date	Title	Artist(s)	Ref.
24	January 4	"El Paso"	Marty Robbins	
24	January 11	"El Paso"	Marty Robbins	
25	January 18	"Running Bear"	Johnny Preston	
25	January 25	"Running Bear"	Johnny Preston	
25	February 1	"Running Bear"	Johnny Preston	
26	February 8	"Teen Angel"	Mark Dinning	
26	February 15	"Teen Angel"	Mark Dinning	
27	February 22	"Theme from A Summer Place"	Percy Faith and his orchestra	
27	February 29	"Theme from A Summer Place"	Percy Faith and his orchestra	
27	March 7	"Theme from A Summer Place"	Percy Faith and his orchestra	
27	March 14	"Theme from A Summer Place"	Percy Faith and his orchestra	
27	March 21	"Theme from A Summer Place"	Percy Faith and his orchestra	
27	March 28	"Theme from A Summer Place"	Percy Faith and his orchestra	
27	April 4	"Theme from A Summer Place"	Percy Faith and his orchestra	
27	April 11	"Theme from A Summer Place"	Percy Faith and his orchestra	
27	April 18	"Theme from A Summer Place"	Percy Faith and his orchestra	
28	April 25	"Stuck on You"	Elvis Presley	
28	May 2	"Stuck on You"	Elvis Presley	
28	May 9	"Stuck on You"	Elvis Presley	
28	May 16	"Stuck on You"	Elvis Presley	
29	May 23	"Cathy's Clown"	The Everly Brothers	
29	May 30	"Cathy's Clown"	The Everly Brothers	
29	June 6	"Cathy's Clown"	The Everly Brothers	
29	June 13	"Cathy's Clown"	The Everly Brothers	
29	June 20	"Cathy's Clown"	The Everly Brothers	
30	June 27	"Everybody's Somebody's Fool"	Connie Francis	
30	July 4	"Everybody's Somebody's Fool"	Connie Francis	
31	July 11	"Alley Oop"	Hollywood Argyles	
32	July 18	"I'm Sorry"	Brenda Lee	
32	July 25	"I'm Sorry"	Brenda Lee	
32	August 1	"I'm Sorry"	Brenda Lee	
33	August 8	"Itsy Bitsy Teenie Weenie Yellow Polkadot Bikini"	Brian Hyland	
34	August 15	"It's Now or Never"	Elvis Presley	
34	August 22	"It's Now or Never"	Elvis Presley	
34	August 29	"It's Now or Never"	Elvis Presley	
34	September 5	"It's Now or Never"	Elvis Presley	
34	September 12	"It's Now or Never"	Elvis Presley	
35	September 19	"The Twist"	Chubby Checker	
36	September 26	"My Heart Has a Mind of Its Own"	Connie Francis	
36	October 3	"My Heart Has a Mind of Its Own"	Connie Francis	
37	October 10	"Mr. Custer"	Larry Verne	
38	October 17	"Save the Last Dance for Me"	The Drifters	
39	October 24	"I Want to Be Wanted"	Brenda Lee	
38 (re)	October 31	"Save the Last Dance for Me"	The Drifters	
38 (re)	November 7	"Save the Last Dance for Me"	The Drifters	
40	November 14	"Georgia on My Mind"	Ray Charles	
41	November 21	"Stay"	Maurice Williams and the Zodiacs	
42	November 28	"Are You Lonesome Tonight?"	Elvis Presley	
42	December 5	"Are You Lonesome Tonight?"	Elvis Presley	
42	December 12	"Are You Lonesome Tonight?"	Elvis Presley	
42	December 19	"Are You Lonesome Tonight?"	Elvis Presley	
42	December 26	"Are You Lonesome Tonight?"	Elvis Presley	

== Number-one artists ==
List of number-one artists by total weeks at number one
Weeks at No. 1	Artist
14	Elvis Presley
9	Percy Faith
5	The Everly Brothers
4	Connie Francis
4	Brenda Lee
3	Johnny Preston
3	The Drifters
2	Marty Robbins
2	Mark Dinning
1	Hollywood Argyles
1	Brian Hyland
1	Chubby Checker
1	Larry Verne
1	Ray Charles
1	Maurice Williams and the Zodiacs

== See also ==
- 1960 in music
- List of Billboard number-one singles
- List of Billboard Hot 100 top-ten singles in 1960
- List of Billboard Hot 100 number-one singles from 1958 to 1969
