= Nelson Keene =

British singer

Malcolm Holland (born 9 March 1942), known professionally as Nelson Keene, is a British pop singer who was prominent in the early 1960s.

Keene was born in Farnborough, Hampshire, one of ten children. As a singer, he was managed by Larry Parnes, who chose his stage name - along with those of many other pop singers of the period including Billy Fury, Marty Wilde, Vince Eager and Georgie Fame - and was signed to His Master's Voice. His first single, "Image of a Girl", a cover version of a US top ten hit by The Safaris, reached No. 37 on the UK Singles Chart in 1960, but was outsold by Mark Wynter's rival version of the same song. Two follow-ups, "Keep Loving Me" (1960) and "Miracles Are Happening To Me" (1961) failed to reach the chart, and Keene's recording career appears to have ended at that point.

Keene was reported as living in Australia in 2010.
