= Cradle of Love =

Cradle of Love may refer to:

- Cradle of Love (Johnny Preston song), 1960
- Cradle of Love (Billy Idol song), 1990
- The English title of the Philippine TV drama Duyan
