= That Texas Jamboree =

1946 film by Ray Nazarro

- Theatrical release poster
- Directed by: Ray Nazarro
- Screenplay by: J. Benton Cheney
- Story by: Paul Gangelin
- Produced by: Colbert Clark
- Starring: Ken Curtis; Jeff Donnell; Andy Clyde; Guinn "Big Boy" Williams; Robert Kellard
- Cinematography: George Meehan
- Edited by: Aaron Stell
- Production company: Columbia Pictures
- Distributed by: Columbia Pictures
- Release date: May 16, 1946
- Running time: 59 minutes
- Country: United States
- Language: English

That Texas Jamboree is a 1946 American Western film directed by Ray Nazarro and written by J. Benton Cheney. The film stars Ken Curtis, Jeff Donnell, Andy Clyde, Guinn "Big Boy" Williams, and Robert Kellard. The film was released on May 16, 1946, by Columbia Pictures.

== Cast ==
- Ken Curtis as Curt Chambers
- Jeff Donnell as Jean Warren
- Andy Clyde as Andy Warren
- Guinn "Big Boy" Williams as Big Boy Frazer
- Robert Kellard as Tom Hanlon
- Ginger Dinning as Dinning Sister
- Jean Dinning as Dinning Sister
- Lou Dinning as Dinning Sister
- Paul Trietsch as Hezzie Warren
- Ken Trietsch as Ken Warren
- Gil Taylor as Gil Warren
- Charles Ward as Gabe Warren
- Carolina Cotton as Carolina Cotton
