= Goodbye Baby =

Goodbye Baby may refer to:

- "Goodbye Baby" (Jack Scott song), a 1958 song by Jack Scott
- "Goodbye Baby", a 1964 song by Long John Baldry, B-side of "I'm On To You Baby"
- "Goodbye Baby", a 1967 song by Van Morrison, B-side to "Brown Eyed Girl"
- "Goodbye Baby", a song by Boyce and Hart
- "Goodbye Baby", a 2003 song by Fleetwood Mac from the album Say You Will
- "Good Bye Baby", a 2006 song, A-side of Big Bang Third Single Album by Big Bang
- "Good Bye Baby" (Miss A song), 2011
- "Goodbye Baby", a 2005 song by Status Quo from the album The Party Ain't Over Yet

== See also ==
- "Goodbye Babe", 1965 song by The Castaways
