= O Dio Mio =

1960 song by Annette Funicello

Single by Annette Funicello

from the album The Story of My Teens
- B-side: "It Took Dreams"
- Released: January 1960
- Genre: Pop
- Length: 2:47
- Label: Vista
- Songwriter(s): Al Hoffman; Dick Manning

Annette Funicello singles chronology
"First Name Initial" (1959)	"O Dio Mio" (1960)	"Train of Love" (1960)

"O Dio Mio" is a song performed by American singer Annette Funicello. Written and composed by Al Hoffman and Dick Manning, it was released in January 1960 and included on Funicello's album The Story of My Teens.

== Lyrics and composition ==
The song, at 2 minutes and 47 seconds long, and with a tempo of 116 beats per minute, is in the key of F major, switching to F sharp / G flat major at the end. In the love song, Funicello pleads to God to let her significant other know that she needs and wants him, longs for his love like "heaven above", and is reminded of him when she hears church bells. The song title, "O Dio Mio," is Italian for "Oh my god," and there are versions of the song recorded by Funicello in both languages.

On the B-side is a song titled "It Took Dreams".

== Chart performance and reception ==
"O Dio Mio" debuted at number 68 on the Billboard Hot 100 on the week of February 22, 1960, reaching the top ten in late March, and leaving the chart in May, having spent a total of 12 weeks there. It peaked at number 20 on the Canadian CHUM Chart.

A writer for Billboard called the song an "attractive ballad" in which a "young thrush" "shows a heartfelt delivery," adding that the B-side is a "catchy rhythm tune, done multi-track style, providing a strong coupling." Billboard would also go on to rank "O Dio Mio" as the 88th biggest song of 1960, as the year closed out.
