= Under Your Spell Again =

Single by Buck Owens

from the album Buck Owens
- B-side: "Tired of Livin'"
- Released: July 13, 1959
- Recorded: 1959
- Genre: Country
- Length: 2:41
- Label: Capitol
- Songwriters: Buck Owens; Dusty Rhodes
- Producer: Ken Nelson

Buck Owens singles chronology
"Second Fiddle" (1959)	"Under Your Spell Again" (1959)	"Above and Beyond" (1960)

"Under Your Spell Again" is a song co-written and recorded by American country music artist Buck Owens. The song peaked at number 4 on the U.S. Billboard Hot Country Singles chart.

== Chart performance ==
=== Buck Owens ===
Chart (1959)	Peak position
US Hot Country Songs (Billboard)	4

=== Ray Price ===
Chart (1959)	Peak position
US Hot Country Songs (Billboard)	5

=== Johnny Rivers ===
Chart (1966)	Peak position
US Billboard Hot 100	35
Canada Top Singles (RPM)	2

=== Waylon Jennings and Jessi Colter ===
Chart (1971)	Peak position
U.S. Billboard Hot Country Singles	39

=== Barbara Fairchild ===
Chart (1976)	Peak position
US Hot Country Songs (Billboard)	65

=== Shelby Lynne ===
Chart (1989)	Peak position
US Hot Country Songs (Billboard)	93

== Cover versions ==
Ray Price recorded and released his version also in 1959, the same year Buck Owens did.

Jeanne Black and her sister Janie Black released a version of the song as the B-side to her 1960 hit single "He'll Have to Stay".
