= Image of a Girl =

Single by The Safaris
- B-side: "4 Steps to Love"
- Released: May 1960
- Genre: Doo-wop
- Length: 2:27
- Label: Eldo
- Songwriters: Richard Clasky, Marvin Rosenberg

The Safaris singles chronology
"Image of a Girl" (1960)	"The Girl with the Story in Her Eyes" (1960)

"Image of a Girl" is a song written by Richard Clasky and Marvin Rosenberg and performed by The Safaris featuring The Phantom's Band. It reached #6 on the U.S. pop chart in 1960.

The song ranked #62 on Billboard magazine's Top 100 singles of 1960.

== Other charting versions ==
- Mark Wynter released a version of the song as a single in 1960 which reached #11 on the UK Singles Chart.
- Nelson Keene released a version of the song as a single in 1960 which reached #37 on the UK Singles Chart.

== Other versions ==
- Otis Williams and the Charms released a version of the song as a single in 1960, but it did not chart.
- Meredith MacRae featuring Candy Johnson's Exciters released a version of the song as a single in 1964 entitled "Image of a Boy", but it did not chart.
- The Torquays released a version of the song as a single in 1965, but it did not chart.
- The Deep Six released a version of the song as a single in 1966, but it did not chart.
