= Lonely Blue Boy =

Studio album by Conway Twitty
- Released: January 1960
- Genre: Rock and roll, rockabilly
- Label: MGM

Lonely Blue Boy is a studio album from Conway Twitty, released in 1960. The title track reached number six on the U.S. Billboard Hot 100 during the winter of 1960 and became a gold record. Although unreleased, the song had originally been recorded by Elvis Presley as "Danny" for the movie King Creole.

== Track listing ==
1. "Lonely Blue Boy" (Ben Weisman/Fred Wise)
2. "Just Because"
3. "Easy to Fall in Love"
4. "Sorry"
5. "My Adobe Hacienda"
6. "A Huggin' and a Kissin'"
7. "Trouble in Mind"
8. "Pretty Eyed Baby"
9. "Eternal Tears"
10. "Blue Moon"
11. "Can't We Go Steady"
12. "Heartbreak Hotel"

== Charts ==
Chart	Peak	Ref
Billboard Hot 100	6	
