= Lonely Blue Boy (song) =

- Italian release picture sleeve

Single by Conway Twitty

from the album Lonely Blue Boy
- B-side: "Star Spangled Heaven"
- Released: December 1959
- Genre: Rockabilly
- Length: 2:12
- Label: MGM
- Songwriters: Ben Weisman, Fred Wise

Conway Twitty singles chronology
"Danny Boy" (1959)	"Lonely Blue Boy" (1959)	"What Am I Living For" (1960)

"Lonely Blue Boy" (originally entitled "Danny" and sung by Elvis Presley) is a song written by Ben Weisman and Fred Wise. The song was earmarked originally for the soundtrack to Presley's 1958 film King Creole. It was recorded but ultimately cut from the film and soundtrack before they were released. Elvis Presley’s original recording was ultimately released twenty years later on the compilation album Elvis: A Legendary Performer Volume 3 (1978) and was featured on the expanded 1997 re-release of the film's soundtrack album.

Singer Conway Twitty picked up on the song and recorded it, with a slightly revised title and lyrics, as "Lonely Blue Boy". It reached #6 on the Billboard Hot 100 in the United States and #27 on the Billboard R&B chart in 1960. It was featured on his 1960 album Lonely Blue Boy.

The song ranked #38 on Billboard magazine's Top 100 singles of 1960.

In the United Kingdom, rock and roll singers Cliff Richard (with his backing band the Shadows under their original name, the Drifters) and Marty Wilde each recorded versions with the original “Danny” title and lyrics in 1959 (see below).

== Other versions ==
- Cliff Richard and The Drifters featuring the Mike Sammes Singers released a version of the song as "Danny" on their 1959 album Cliff.
- Marty Wilde released a version of the song as "Danny" on the B-side to his 1959 single "A Teenager in Love".
- Vince Eager released a version of the song as a single in 1960 in United Kingdom, but it did not chart.
- Graham Bonnet released a version of the song as "Danny" on his 1977 album Graham Bonnet. The song peaked at number 79 in Australia.
- Billy Hancock with The Tennessee Rockets released a version of the song as the B-side to their 1980 single "Redskin Rock 'N Roll".
- Shakin' Stevens released a version of the song on his 1980 album Marie Marie.
- The Spiders released a version of the song on their 1970 album Rock & Roll Renaissance.
- Elvis Costello and the Attractions released a version of the song on the 2002 re-release of the album Blood & Chocolate.
- Bill Wyman's Rhythm Kings released a version of the song on their 2001 album Double Bill.
- The Beat Farmers released a version of the song on their 2003 live album Live at the Spring Valley Inn, 1983.
- Dale Watson released a version of the song on his 2016 album Under the Influence.

== In popular culture ==
- Twitty's version was featured in the 2002 film Punch-Drunk Love and featured on the film's soundtrack. The song was also featured in the 2011 film Limitless starring Bradley Cooper.
