= Feel So Fine =

Single by Johnny Preston

from the album Come Rock With Me
- B-side: "I'm Starting to Go Steady"
- Released: 1960
- Genre: Rock and roll
- Length: 2:06
- Label: Mercury
- Songwriter: Leonard Lee

Johnny Preston singles chronology
"Cradle of Love" (1960)	"Feel So Fine" (1960)	"Charming Billy" (1960)

"Feel So Fine" is a song released in 1960 by Johnny Preston. The song is a reworking of the 1955 song "Feel So Good" by Shirley & Lee, with modified lyrics.

== Shirley & Lee version ==
Shirley & Lee's "Feel So Good" reached No. 2 on Billboard's Rhythm & Blues Records chart for "Most Played in Juke Boxes", No. 5 on Billboard's Rhythm & Blues Records chart for "Best Sellers in Stores", No. 7 on Billboard's Rhythm & Blues Records chart for "Most Played by Jockeys", and No. 6 on Cash Box's Rhythm & Blues Top 15.

== Johnny Preston version ==
Johnny Preston's version was released in 1960, and spent 14 weeks on the Billboard Hot 100 chart, peaking at No. 14, while reaching No. 9 on the Cash Box Top 100, No. 6 in Flanders, No. 9 in Australia, No. 14 on Canada's CHUM Hit Parade, No. 18 in the United Kingdom, and No. 26 in Wallonia.

=== Chart performance ===
Chart (1960)	Peak position
Australia	9
Canada (CHUM Hit Parade)	14
Flanders	6
UK Record Retailer	18
UK New Musical Express	18
US Billboard Hot 100	14
US Cash Box Top 100	9
US Cash Box Records Disc Jockeys Played Most	8
US Cash Box Top Ten Juke Box Tunes	9
Wallonia	26

== Kenny Vernon version ==
Kenny Vernon released a version of "Feel So Fine" as a single in 1972 and on the album Loversville in 1973. Vernon's version reached No. 55 on Billboard's Hot Country Singles chart.
