= The Deep Six (band) =

- Origin: San Diego, California, United States
- Genres: Folk rock; sunshine pop; psychedelic; garage rock
- Years active: 1960s
- Labels: Liberty

The Deep Six were an American folk rock, sunshine pop and psychedelic band from San Diego, California. They are best-remembered for their self-titled album released in 1966 on Liberty Records.

The Deep Six started out as a folk trio in San Diego California, before adding members to their roster and expending into full electric band. They were a predominantly male group backing a female vocalist sometimes referred to as "Miss Dean Cannon." They did a seventeen-week stint as the house band at the Land of Oden, a folk club located in La Mesa, which was co-owned by their co-manager, Ken Mansfield.

They released a single for Liberty Records, a subsidiary of Capitol Records, featuring the song "Rising Sun" on which Jim Messina of Buffalo Springfield contributed a guitar part. The band promoted the song on both "American Bandstand" and "Where the Action Is" in 1965 and 1966 respectively. The Deep Six went on to record a self-titled album for Liberty, in which many of Los Angeles' finest session musicians played parts. The album included the Cannon-sung take on Bob Lind's "Unlock the Door", as well as covers of the Rolling Stones' "Paint it Black" and Neil Diamond's "Solitary Man". It featured a photograph of the band running along the waters' edge of a California beach. The album and the band's subsequent singles failed to chart. Original member, Dave Gray departed and was replaced by Barry Kane, previously in the New Christy Minstrels and a duo with Barry McGuire. Eventually the group broke up. Their manager, Ken Mansfield, went on to become an executive at Capitol Records and would become the first U.S. manager for the Beatles' Apple label in 1968. Bass player Dann Lottermoser would go on to join Stone Country, a country rock band, who recorded an album for RCA, and included the presence of singer-songwriter Steve Young.

The album, The Deep Six, was reissued for CD in 2003, by Rev-Ola Records, and included not only songs from the original album, but five additional bonus tracks.

== Discography ==
Singles

- “Rising Sun” / “Strollin’ Blues” - (Saw-Man 001, 1965)
- “Rising Sun” / “Strollin’ Blues” - (Liberty 55838, Oct. 1965)
- “I Wanna Shout” / “The Things We Say” - (Liberty 55858, Feb. 1966)
- “Counting” / “When the Morning Breaks” - (Liberty 55882, May 1966)
- “What Would You Wish from the Golden Fish” / “Why Say Goodbye” - (Liberty 55901, July 1966)
- "Image of a Girl" / “C'mon Baby (Blow Your Mind)” – (Liberty 55926, Nov. 1966)

Album

- The Deep Six (Liberty LRP-3475/LST-7475, 1966)
