= Goodbye Baby (Jack Scott song) =

Single by Jack Scott

from the album Jack Scott
- B-side: "Save My Soul"
- Released: November 1958
- Genre: Country rock
- Length: 2:06
- Label: Carlton
- Songwriter(s): Jack Scott

Jack Scott singles chronology
| "With Your Love" (1958) | "Goodbye Baby" (1958) | "I Never Felt Like This" (1959) |

"Goodbye Baby" is a song written and performed by Jack Scott featuring The Chantones Vocal Group. The song was featured on his 1958 album, Jack Scott.

== Chart performance ==
It reached #8 on the U.S. pop chart in 1959. The B-side to Scott's version, "Save My Soul", reached #73 in the U.S. pop chart in 1959. The songs co-charted in Canada's CHUM Chart, reaching #3.

The song ranked #79 on Billboard magazine's Top 100 songs of 1959.

== Other versions ==
- The Howard Morrison Quartet released a version of the song as a single in 1959, but it did not chart.
- Robert Gordon released a version of the song on his 1994 album All for the Love of Rock 'N' Roll.
