= The Dinning Sisters =

American singing group

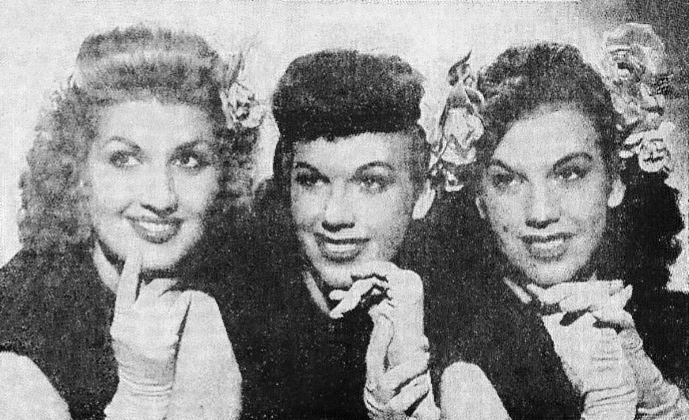
The Dinning Sisters

The Dinning Sisters were an American sisters singing group, active from the late 1930s to 1955. They made a handful of film appearances and had several hit records at the height of their popularity in the late 1940s.

The trio originally consisted of Ella Lucille "Lou" Dinning (1920–2000), Eugenia Doy "Jean" Dinning (1924–2011), and Virginia Moy "Ginger" Dinning (1924–2013). Jean and Ginger were twins.

Lou Dinning left the group in 1946 to be replaced by Jayne Bundesen (1921–2010). Beginning in 1949, another Dinning sister was added to the lineup, replacing Bundsen: Dolores May "Tootsie" Dinning (1929-2015). This version of the Dinning Sisters lasted through about 1953, before Dolores left to continue her musical career as a session singer. Ginger and Jean continued to release material through 1955, before breaking up the act.

Jean and Dolores both remained in the music business. Jean co-wrote the 1959 hit single "Teen Angel" for her brother Mark Dinning, while Dolores was a co-founder of The Nashville Edition, a singing group heard as backing vocalists on numerous records of the 1960s, 1970s and 1980s.

The original three Dinning Sisters (Lou, Jean and Ginger) reunited in the 1980s, and performed through the 1990s.

== Early years ==
The three sisters (Lou, Jean and Ginger) were born in Caldwell, Kansas, United States, and raised in Oklahoma. From a family of nine children, all of whom sang harmony in church, the three sisters won amateur singing contests. Older sister Marvis was a vocalist with Wally Stoefler and His Orchestra from the late 1930s through the early 1950s.

== Radio ==
By 1939, the Dinnings had a program on WENR in Chicago, Illinois. They first gained national exposure on the WLS, Chicago and national NBC "Blue Network" radio show "National Barn Dance".

== Recording ==
By 1942, the sisters appeared regularly on NBC radio, and had made an appearance in the 1942 Ozzie Nelson film Strictly in the Groove. In 1943, the group was signed by Capitol Records to be that label's answer to The Andrews Sisters, who recorded exclusively for Decca Records. Lucille (Lou) Dinning once said, "Let's face it, the Andrews Sisters were way ahead of us. We tried our darndest to be as commercial as they were, but weren't flashy enough. We were all kind of shy. We came from a farm in Oklahoma. We never took dancing lessons or anything." The Dinnings sounded rather like The Andrews Sisters in fast-paced recordings such as the boogie-woogie influenced "Pig Foot Pete", as well as "Down in the Diving Bell", "The Hawaiian War Chant", and "They Just Chopped Down the Old Apple Tree", an "answer" song to "Don't Sit Under the Apple Tree (with Anyone Else but Me)". The Dinning sound could also be compared, especially in slower ballads, to the soft blend of The Lennon Sisters, who appeared in the 1950s on The Lawrence Welk Show.

The Dinning Sisters began issuing recordings for Capitol in 1945, and the original trio (Lou, Jean and Ginger) also appeared in the films The National Barn Dance (1944), That Texas Jamboree (1946) and Throw a Saddle on a Star (1946)., performing several musical numbers in each film. A later line-up without Lou can be heard in the animated Disney presentations Fun and Fancy Free (1947), Melody Time (1948) and the short Blame It on the Samba (1948). Their 1945 self-titled album reached No. 3 in the US.

As recording artists their greatest period of success came in 1947 and 1948, when they charted four hits, including two top 10 successes ("My Adobe Hacienda" and "Buttons and Bows"). By this time, Lou had left the act to marry songwriter Don Robertson; she was replaced by Jayne Bundesen. The act remained billed as "The Dinning Sisters", although Bundesen was no relation.

Based in Chicago through most of the 1940s, Jean and Ginger decided to move to Hollywood in 1949, while Bundesen, married to a Chicago attorney, elected to stay in Illinois. To keep the act going, Jean and Ginger recruited younger sister Dolores to fill the third spot, and The Dinning Sisters were once again a trio of actual sisters.

The Dinning Sisters issued a steady stream of recordings over the next few years, but chart hits were no longer forthcoming. The group left Capitol for Decca Records in 1953, and Dolores left the group the same year. The Dinning Sisters' last recordings were issued for Essex Records in 1955, with the duo using overdubbing techniques to allow them to continue to sound like a trio.

== Later careers ==
- Lou Dinning was married to composer and pop artist Don Robertson. She made several recordings for Capitol Records as Lou Dinning from 1951–57, including duets with her husband Don. They also recorded songwriting demos for a range of clients, including Johnny Mercer and Frank Loesser.
- Jean Dinning issued a couple of solo singles in 1955, and later (using her married name of Jean Surrey) co-composed the song, "Teen Angel", which became a No. 1 hit for her brother, Mark Dinning, in 1959. Mark Dinning's follow up single "A Star Is Born (A Love Has Died)" was also co-composed by Jean, hitting the lower reaches of the charts in the US and Australia.
- Ginger Dinning (latterly Virginia Lutke) wed building contractor Harry Lutke, relocated to Ridgewood, New Jersey, raised seven children, and remained active in music by singing in a Barbershop Quartet and assisting with the theatrical productions of a local high school.
- Dolores Dinning moved to Nashville. Under her married name of Dolores Edgin, she was one of the founders of the backup vocalist quartet The Nashville Edition, probably best known to the public for their performances on the long-running TV show Hee-Haw. But behind the scenes, and often uncredited, the quartet also worked as backing vocalists on literally thousands of recordings between about 1960 and 1993, including hit records by George Jones, Tammy Wynette, Brenda Lee, Marty Robbins, Elvis Presley, Nancy Sinatra, and many, many others.

== Reunion ==
The original three Dinning Sisters (Lou, Jean and Ginger) reunited in 1987, performing at the Grand Ole Opry and other venues. They later issued a collaborative gospel album with The Jordanaires in 1993. Rhinestone Christian, credited to The Jordanaires and The Dinning Sisters, featured six songs penned by Jean, alongside several gospel standards.

== Hit singles ==
Year	Single	US Chart position	Label	Catalog Ref.
1947	"My Adobe Hacienda"	9	Capitol	389
1947	"I Wonder Who's Kissing Her Now"	12	Capitol	433
1948	"Beg Your Pardon"	12	Capitol	490
1948	"Buttons and Bows"	7	Capitol	15184

Notably, all four of the charted hits by The Dinning Sisters were contemporaneous covers of songs that were bigger hits for other artists at exactly the same time.

- Eddy Howard hit #2 with "My Adobe Hacienda" in 1947, outpacing the Dinnings' #9 placing of the same song
- Perry Como (at #2) and Ray Noble (at #11) charted higher than the Dinnings #12 hit "I Wonder Who's Kissing Her Now", all issued in 1947
- Francis Craig hit #3 with "Beg Your Pardon" in 1948, eclipsing the Dinnings' #12 showing
- Buttons and Bows" was a million-seller (and a #1 hit) for Dinah Shore in 1948, compared to The Dinnings' chart placing of the same song at #7

== Other relatives ==
- Another sister, Marvis Dinning (née Marvis Geraldine Dinning; 1918–2000) (died as Marvis Smith), was a vocalist with Wally Stoefler (né Wallace Udell Stoeffler; 1906–1979) and His Orchestra from the late 1930s through the early 1950s. She had married Harry Smith (né Harry Franklin Smith) — a featured trumpeter with the Stoefler Orchestra — on January 3, 1942, in Shawnee, Oklahoma.
- Youngest brother Mark Dinning (born Max Edward Dinning, 1933-1986) recorded the number one US hit "Teen Angel", which had been written by Jean.
- The group was managed by an older brother, Wade Dinning (1914-2007), who drove them to their first audition. Wade was also an occasional songwriter, with Lou Dinning recording his song "So Long" in 1957. Wade's son Dean Dinning much later became the bassist in 1990s recording act Toad The Wet Sprocket.
