= That Crazy Feeling =

1958 song by Ray Doggett recorded by Kenny Rogers

Single by Kenny Rogers
- B-side: "We'll Always Have Each Other"
- Released: February 1958
- Genre: Doo-wop
- Length: 2:11
- Label: Carlton Records
- Songwriter(s): Ray Doggett

Kenny Rogers singles chronology
"That Crazy Feeling" (1958)	"I've Got a Lot to Learn" (1958)

"That Crazy Feeling" is the debut single by American singer Kenny Rogers (then known as Kenneth Rogers). It was released in 1957, first by Kix Records and then picked up in 1958 by Carlton Records.

== Success ==
The song was a major seller in Houston, Texas, Rogers' hometown, where he was established among the general public as a member of the doo-wop outfit the Scholars, who had just broken up after several releases.

"That Crazy Feeling" was issued with "We'll Always Have Each Other" as the B-side, and it sold well and reached the top three on the local sales charts. The success of the single earned Rogers a national TV appearance on American Bandstand to promote the single. However, its huge success in Houston was not mirrored elsewhere. While it did not reach the Billboard magazine national chart, it did chart as high as number 51 on the Cash Box top 100 hit list.

It was successful enough to be included on a various artists collection issued by Carlton the following year, titled One Dozen Goldies. Carlton issued a follow-up single by Rogers, "I've Got a Lot to Learn" backed with "For You Alone".

Rogers later signed with a variety of labels after being dropped by Carlton and went on to worldwide fame in following decades. Despite his status as one of the music industry's best-selling artists, "That Crazy Feeling" was not re-released until it appeared on Rogers' career spanning box set Through the Years: A Retrospective in 1998. It also appeared on the 2013 various artists compilation For You Alone: The Carlton Records Story with several other recordings by Rogers.
