= My Adobe Hacienda =

Song

"My Adobe Hacienda" is a song composed by Louise Massey and Lee Penny. It first became popular in 1941 with Massey's recorded version, where it placed at #23. The song was most popular in 1947 when Eddy Howard took the song to #2. That year the song was also recorded by Kenny Baker (#16), the Dinning Sisters (#9), and the Billy Williams Quartet (#13). Massey's original recording was re-released, and this time attained a chart position of #16. Between May and June 1947, the song appeared on Your Hit Parade for three weeks. Billboard listed it as 1947's 12th best seller in sheet music. Art Kassel released the song as a Vogue picture disc.

In the lyrics, the singer describes a sense of fulfillment in both life and love when at "my adobe hacienda."
