= Love You So (Ron Holden song) =

Single by Ron Holden

from the album Love You So...
- B-side: "My Babe"
- Released: December 1959
- Genre: R&B
- Length: 2:58
- Label: Donna
- Songwriter(s): Ron Holden

Ron Holden singles chronology
"Love You So" (1959)	"Gee, But I'm Lonesome" (1960)

"Love You So" is a song written by Ron Holden and performed by Holden featuring The Thunderbirds. It reached #7 on the U.S. pop chart and #11 on the U.S. R&B chart in 1960. It was featured on his 1960 album Love You So...

The song ranked #48 on Billboard magazine's Top 100 singles of 1960.

== Other versions ==
- Demolition Doll Rods released a version of the song as the B-side to their 2000 single "Love Bug".
