= He'll Have to Stay =

Single by Jeanne Black

from the album A Little Bit Lonely
- B-side: "Under Your Spell Again"; (featuring Janie Black)
- Released: March 28, 1960 (US Release); May 1960 (UK Release)
- Genre: Country
- Length: 2:41
- Label: Capitol
- Songwriters: Audrey Allison, Charles Grean, Joe Allison
- Producer: Ken Nelson

Jeanne Black singles chronology
"He'll Have to Stay" (1960)	"Lisa" (1960)

"He'll Have to Stay" is a song written by Audrey Allison, Charles Grean, and Joe Allison and performed by Jeanne Black. The song is an answer song to Jim Reeves' 1959 hit "He'll Have to Go". It was produced by Ken Nelson.

It reached #4 on the US pop chart, #6 on the US country chart, #11 on the US R&B chart, and #41 on the UK Singles Chart in 1960. The song was featured on her 1960 album, A Little Bit Lonely.

The single ranked #52 on the Billboard Year-End Hot 100 singles of 1960.

== Chart performance ==
Chart (1960)	Peak position
UK Singles (The Official Charts Company)	41
U.S. Billboard Hot C&W Sides	6
US Billboard Hot 100	4
US Hot R&B Sides (Billboard)	11

== Cover versions and later versions ==
- Caterina Valente released a version of the song in the Netherlands entitled "Caro Mio" as the B-side to her 1960 single "Zeeman (Je Verlangen Is De Zee)".
- Ann-Louise Hanson released a version of the song in the Sweden entitled "Han Stannar Här" as part of an EP in 1960.
- Skeeter Davis released a version of the song on her 1961 album, Here's the Answer.
