= Carlton Records =

American record label

Carlton Records was a record label based in New York City that was formed by former RCA Records A&R head Joe Carlton in 1957. Guaranteed Records was a sublabel of Carlton. Carlton Records lasted until 1964. The most notable recording artists on Carlton included The Chantels - The Chantels are considered one of the first major girl groups in American pop music. They hit it big with their 1957 single "Maybe," which climbed to #15 on the Billboard Hot 100, and later inched even higher to #14 with the 1961 single "Look in My Eyes."Jack Scott, Anita Bryant, and Paul Evans. The country music superstar Kenny Rogers released two of his early singles on the label, namely "That Crazy Feeling" and "For You Alone."

After Carlton Records went bankrupt in 1964, Joe Carlton held positions at ABC-Paramount Records and Columbia Records. He eventually became president of the Command Records unit of ABC Records in 1968. When ABC Records moved to Los Angeles, Carlton resigned as he stayed in New York and co-founded Organic Productions in 1970. By the late 1970s, he was with Almo Music.
