= The Torquays =

The Torquays were a instrumental surf band from Orange County, California.

The group consisted of Gerry Gordon, who had formed a band of the same name in 1964 that never released any recorded material. The band was reformed in 1990 with Gordon joined by Duff Paulsen (drums), Don Parra (bass) and Steve Soest (guitar). The band played almost exclusively in Orange County.

Their debut album, A Date with the Torquays, was released in 1999. Music critic Cub Koda praised the retro sound in the album, saying the tracks "sound like they were all cut in 1962". Similarly he said their second album Road Trip! (2000) showed "no sophomore slump as they negotiate through a batch of great, fiery instrumentals with consummate ease." Their third album, Return Engagement was released in 2003, and their fourth and final album, Somewhere in California was released in 2005.

The band had a small part at the end of the Ron Mann directed film Tales of the Rat Fink (2006) about the life of Ed Roth.
