= Go, Jimmy, Go =

Single by Jimmy Clanton

from the album My Best to You
- B-side: "I Trusted You"
- Released: November 1959
- Genre: Rock and roll
- Length: 2:12
- Label: Ace
- Songwriter(s): Doc Pomus, Mort Shuman

Jimmy Clanton singles chronology
"My Own True Love" (1959)	"Go, Jimmy, Go" (1959)	"Another Sleepless Night" (1960)

"Go, Jimmy, Go" is a song written by Doc Pomus and Mort Shuman and performed by Jimmy Clanton. It reached #5 on the U.S. pop chart on July 12, 1959, #19 on the U.S. R&B chart, and #1 in Canada. It was featured on Clanton's 1961 album My Best to You. The song ranked #33 on Billboard magazine's Top 100 singles of 1960.

== Production ==
Doc Pomus and Mort Shuman originally wrote a song titled "Go, Bobby, Go" for Bobby Rydell who sang it "half-heartedly" due to not being interested in singing a song with his name in it. Rydell did record the song, but he did not release it. Pomus later rode in a taxi to Fox Theater in Brooklyn where a rock and roll show with Alan Freed was happening, where he offered the song to Jimmy Clanton while he was backstage. Pomus changed the title to "Go, Jimmy, Go" and said that the song was written for Clanton. Wayne Harada wrote in The Honolulu Advertiser that the song is "one of the few upbeat tunes in Jim's repertoire."

== Reception ==
A Billboard review said, "Go, Jimmy, Go" is a swinging side that that finds Clanton in fine form. The rocker has lots to attract teens, and the side appears a likely winner." Charles J. Schreiber wrote a negative review in The Gazette stating, "Although Jimmy can do better, this will still be a big hit. His public doesn't care so long as Jimmy sings."

In November 1959, Clanton told the Hawaii Tribune-Herald that "his most recent release, "Go, Jimmy, Go", has given indications on the Mainland of being a potential hit." The title of the 1959 musical comedy film Go, Johnny, Go! was inspired by the song's title.
