= What in the World's Come Over You =

Single by Jack Scott

from the album What in the World's Come Over You
- B-side: "Baby, Baby"
- Released: December 1959
- Genre: Rockabilly
- Length: 2:30
- Label: Top Rank
- Songwriter(s): Jack Scott
- Producer(s): Sonny Lester

Jack Scott singles chronology
"There Comes a Time" (1959)	"What in the World's Come Over You" (1959)	"Burning Bridges" (1960)

"What in the World's Come Over You" is a song written and performed by Jack Scott. It was featured on his 1960 album What in the World's Come Over You. The song was produced by Sonny Lester.

== Chart performance ==
It reached #2 in Australia, #2 in Canada, #5 on the U.S. pop chart, #7 on the U.S. R&B chart, and #11 on the UK Singles Chart in 1960. The song ranked #14 on Billboard magazine's Top 100 singles of 1960.

== Other charting versions ==
- Sonny James released a version of the song as a single in 1975 which reached #3 on the Canadian country chart and #10 on the U.S. country chart.
- Tom Jones released a version of the song as a single in 1981 which reached #25 on the U.S. country chart, #33 on the Canadian country chart, and #109 on the U.S. pop chart.

== Other versions ==
- Les Baxter released a version of the song on his 1960 album Young Pops.
- Johnny Lee released a version of the song as the B-side to his 1974 single "So Nice to Be with You".
- Tam White released a version of the song as a single in 1975 in the UK, which reached 36 on the chart.
- Eddy Arnold released a version of the song on his 1990 compilation album Best of Eddy Arnold.
- Wanda Jackson released a version of the song on her 1992 compilation album Let's Have a Party.
- A version by Jim Reeves was released on the 2012 various artists album Country Chart Classics.
