= I Love the Way You Love =

Single by Marv Johnson

from the album More Marv Johnson
- B-side: "Let Me Love You"
- Released: February 1960
- Genre: R&B
- Length: 2:32
- Label: United Artists
- Songwriter(s): Berry Gordy, Mike Ossman, Al Abrams, John O'Den
- Producer(s): Berry Gordy

Marv Johnson singles chronology
| "You Got What It Takes" (1959) | "I Love the Way You Love" (1960) | "Ain't Gonna Be That Way" (1960) |

"I Love the Way You Love" is a song written by Berry Gordy, Mike Ossman, Al Abrams, and John O'Den and performed by Marv Johnson featuring The Rayber Voices. The single was produced by Berry Gordy.

== Chart performance ==
It reached #2 on the U.S. R&B chart, #9 on the U.S. pop chart, and #35 on the UK Singles Chart in 1960. It was featured on his 1960 album More Marv Johnson.

The song ranked #65 on Billboard magazine's Top 100 singles of 1960.

== Other versions ==
- Dicky Doo & The Don'ts released a version of the song on their 1960 album Teen Scene.
- Mary Wells released a version of the song on her 1961 album Bye Bye Baby I Don't Want to Take a Chance.
- Millie released a version of the song as a single in 1964 in the UK, but it did not chart.
- Robbie Montgomery featuring The Kings of Rhythm Orchestra performed a version of the song that was released on Ike & Tina Turner's 1964 album Ike & Tina Turner Revue Live.
- The Chosen Few released a version of the song on their 1975 album Everybody Plays the Fool.
- Big Youth released a version of the song on his 1995 album Hit the Road Jack.
