= Theme from A Summer Place =

1959 single by Percy Faith

"Theme from A Summer Place" is a song with lyrics by Mack Discant and music by Max Steiner, written for the 1959 film A Summer Place, which starred Sandra Dee and Troy Donahue. It was recorded for the film as an instrumental theme by Steiner. Originally known as the "Molly and Johnny Theme", this lush extended cue, as orchestrated by Murray Cutter, is not the main title theme of the film, but an oft-heard love leitmotif for the characters played by Dee and Donahue. A subsequent recording by Hugo Winterhalter was the first to use the title "Theme from A Summer Place". The theme has become a canonical representative of the easy listening genre, and is considered by some to be the definitive easy listening track of all time.

Following its introduction in the film by the Warner Bros. studio orchestra, the theme was recorded by many artists in both instrumental and vocal versions, and has also appeared in a number of subsequent films and television programs. The best-known version of the theme is an instrumental version by Percy Faith and his Orchestra that was a number-one hit for nine weeks on the Billboard Hot 100 chart in 1960.

== Percy Faith version ==
"Theme from A Summer Place"

Single by Percy Faith

from the album A Summer Place
- B-side: Go-Go-Po-Go
- Released: September 1959
- Recorded: 11 September 1959
- Studio: Columbia 30th Street (New York City)
- Genre: Easy listening; waltz
- Length: 2:25
- Label: Columbia/CBS Records
- Composer: Max Steiner
- Lyricist: Mack Discant

Percy Faith singles chronology
"Till" (1957)	"Theme from A Summer Place" (1959)	"Theme for Young Lovers" (1960)

Official audio
- "Theme from A Summer Place" on YouTube

"Theme from A Summer Place"

Single by The Lettermen
- B-side: "Sealed with a Kiss"
- Released: 31 May 1965
- Recorded: 1965
- Genre: Easy listening
- Length: 2:00
- Label: Capitol
- Composer: Max Steiner
- Lyricist: Mack Discant

The Lettermen singles chronology
"Girl with a Little Tin Heart" (1965)	"Theme from A Summer Place" (1965)	"Secretly" (1965)

Percy Faith recorded the most popular version of the theme, an instrumental orchestral arrangement, at the Columbia 30th Street Studio in New York City. It was released in September 1959 as a single on Columbia Records, credited to "Percy Faith and his Orchestra", prior to the November 1959 release of the film A Summer Place.

The single was not an immediate hit, but after it entered the Billboard Hot 100 singles chart at No. 96 on 11 January 1960, it ascended to number one in just six more weeks, on 22 February 1960, going on to set an at-the-time record of nine consecutive weeks at number one, a record that would not be broken until 1977, when "You Light Up My Life" spent ten weeks at the top of the chart. (Perez Prado's "Cherry Pink and Apple Blossom White" remained at number one for 10 weeks on the Best Sellers in Stores chart in 1955, and Elvis Presley's double-sided hit "Don't Be Cruel/Hound Dog" remained at number one for 11 weeks on the Best Sellers in Stores and Jockeys charts in 1956, all prior to the 4 August 1958, creation of the Hot 100 chart.)

The single was also in front of five consecutive No. 2 singles, none of which ever reached the Hot 100's summit: Jimmy Jones' "Handy Man" (29 February), Jim Reeves' "He'll Have to Go" (7–21 March), Bobby Rydell's "Wild One" (28 March), Paul Anka's "Puppy Love" (4–11 April), the Brothers Four's "Greenfields" (sometimes spelled "Green Fields") (18 April), with Elvis Presley's "Stuck on You" (25 April–9 May) in front of "Greenfields" during its last three weeks at No. 2.

"Theme from A Summer Place" remains the longest-running number one instrumental in the history of the Hot 100. Billboard ranked Faith's version as the number one song for 1960. The Faith version reached number 2 on the UK Singles Chart, spending 31 weeks on the chart, and it was also a number 1 hit in Italy under the title "Scandalo al sole".

Faith won a Grammy Award for Record of the Year in 1961 for his recording. This was the first movie theme and the first instrumental to win a Record of the Year Grammy. In 2000, the song was inducted into the Grammy Hall of Fame.

Faith re-recorded the song twice: first, in 1969, as a female choral version, then, in 1976, as a disco version titled "Summer Place '76".

As reported by Casey Kasem on the American Top 40 broadcast of 25 September 1976, "Theme from A Summer Place" is the biggest hit on the American charts by a Canadian artist.

In 2008, Faith's original version was ranked at number 18 on Billboard's top 100 songs during the first 50 years of the Hot 100 chart. The Billboard Book of Number One Hits called it "the most successful instrumental single of the rock era."

=== Charts ===
==== Weekly charts ====
Chart (1960)	Peak position
Canada (CHUM Hit Parade)	4
New Zealand (Lever Hit Parade)	2
UK Singles (OCC)	2
U.S. Billboard Hot 100	1

==== Year-end charts ====
Chart (1960)	Position
US Billboard Hot 100	1

==== All-time charts ====
Chart (1958–2018)	Position
US Billboard Hot 100	23

== Certifications ==
Certifications for "Theme from A Summer Place"
Region	Certification	Certified units/sales
United States (RIAA)	Gold	1,000,000^{^}
^{^} Shipments figures based on certification alone.

== Other notable cover versions ==
"Theme from A Summer Place" has been covered by a number of artists in addition to Percy Faith, in both non-vocal instrumental versions, and with one or more vocalists either singing Discant's lyrics or a wordless melody line. The theme has also been referenced, sampled, or otherwise adapted into several other songs.

=== Instrumental versions ===
- In 1960, Billy Vaughn included an instrumental orchestral arrangement of the theme as the title cut to his album Theme from A Summer Place released on Dot Records, which peaked at number one on the Billboard LP chart.
- In 1961, Mantovani recorded an orchestral rendition of the theme for his album Mantovani Plays Music from 'Exodus' and Other Great Themes; the album reached the top ten on the UK charts.

=== Vocal versions ===
Most vocal versions of the theme have featured Discant's lyrics. However, some featured wordless vocals by singers who voiced the melody line.

- In 1960, British producer, bandleader and arranger Norrie Paramor released his arrangement of the theme as a single on Columbia Records, featuring wordless vocals by soprano Patricia Clarke and credited to "Norrie Paramor & His Orchestra". The single reached number 36 on the UK chart.
- In 1962, Andy Williams covered the theme for his gold-certified album Moon River and Other Great Movie Themes.
- In 1965, male vocal group the Lettermen had a hit with their harmony arrangement of the theme, released as a single on Capitol Records; it reached number 16 on the Billboard Hot 100, and was included on their album The Hit Sounds of the Lettermen.
- In "Homer's Barbershop Quartet", a season 5 (1993) episode of The Simpsons, Jasper Beardsley auditions for the titular quartet by repeatedly singing the words "(It's the) theme from A Summer Place" to the tune.

== See also ==
- List of Billboard Hot 100 number ones of 1960
