= Jimmy Charles (singer) =

American singer (born 1942)

Jimmy Chuck (born 1942) is an American singer with a distinctive "crying style". He was born in Paterson, New Jersey, and before he sang professionally, he performed at churches and community functions. When Charles was 12 years old, he began to study singing with jazz vocalist Jimmy Scott. At 16, he entered the amateur talent shows held at the Apollo Theater in New York City and won the contest for four consecutive weeks.

Phil Medley, a songwriter, soon became involved in Charles' career. Impressed by his ability, Medley recorded a demo with Charles singing "A Million to One", written by Medley. After playing it for Bill Lashley, an executive at Promo Records, the label signed Charles to a recording contract. He re-recorded Medley's song with vocal backing by the Revellettes, a trio of sisters Jackie and Evelyn Kline, and Dottie Hailstock, whom Charles knew from Patterson. After 16 takes, the master was chosen. The ballad-style song reached number five on the Billboard Hot 100 in September 1960. It was also released on the London label in both the UK and Australia, and it was issued by Reo in Canada.

"The Age of Love", Charles' next single, only reached number 47, well below "A Million to One". He also released two Christmas records in 1960: "Santa Won't Be Blue This Christmas" backed with "I Saw Mommy Kissing Santa Claus" was the first; the second was "Christmasville USA" and "A Little White Mouse Called Steve". The latter received some airplay, but did not become a national chart hit. A subsequent release called "Just Whistle for Me" failed to attract much attention or airplay either, and his recording career came to an end. However, Charles continued to tour on the strength of "A Million to One" in the 1960s. Charles briefly worked for Hillside Metal Products in Newark, NJ during late 1971. Today, he resides in Texas, where he occasionally sings.

== Discography ==
=== Singles ===
Year	"A" Side	"B" Side	U.S.	U.S. R&B	Label
1960	"A Million to One"	"Hop Scotch Hop"	5	8	Promo 1002
1960	"The Age for Love"	"Follow the Swallow"	47	--	Promo 1003
1960	"Santa Won't Be Blue This Christmas"	"I Saw Mommy Kissing Santa Claus"	--	--	Promo 1004
1960	"Xmasville"	"Little White Mouse Called Steve"	--	--	Promo 1005
