= The Safaris =

US musical group

- Origin: Los Angeles, California, United States
- Genres: Pop; Doo-wop
- Years active: 1959–1963
- Labels: Eldo; Image; Sudden
- Past members: Karl Becker; Sheldon Breier (died December 24, 1999); Richard Clasky (died June 26, 1999); Harris Levey; Marvin Rosenberg; Jimmy Stephens; Joe Wise, Phil Howard (died February 4th 2025)

The Safaris were an American pop group of the early 1960s from Los Angeles, California.

The Safaris formed in 1959, and the following year released their debut single, "Image of a Girl". The song was a hit in the United States, peaking at #6 on the Billboard Hot 100. The song was covered by Mark Wynter the same year, this version hitting #11 in the United Kingdom.

== Discography ==
=== Singles ===
Year	Title	Peak chart positions	Record Label	B-side
Year	Title	US Pop	Record Label	B-side
1960	"Image of a Girl"	6	Eldo	"4 Steps to Love"
1960	"The Girl With the Story in Her Eyes"	85	Eldo	"Summer Nights"
1960	"Shadows"	—	Eldo	"In the Still of the Night"
1963	"Kick Out"	120	Valiant	"Lonely Surf Guitar"
