= Teen Angel (song) =

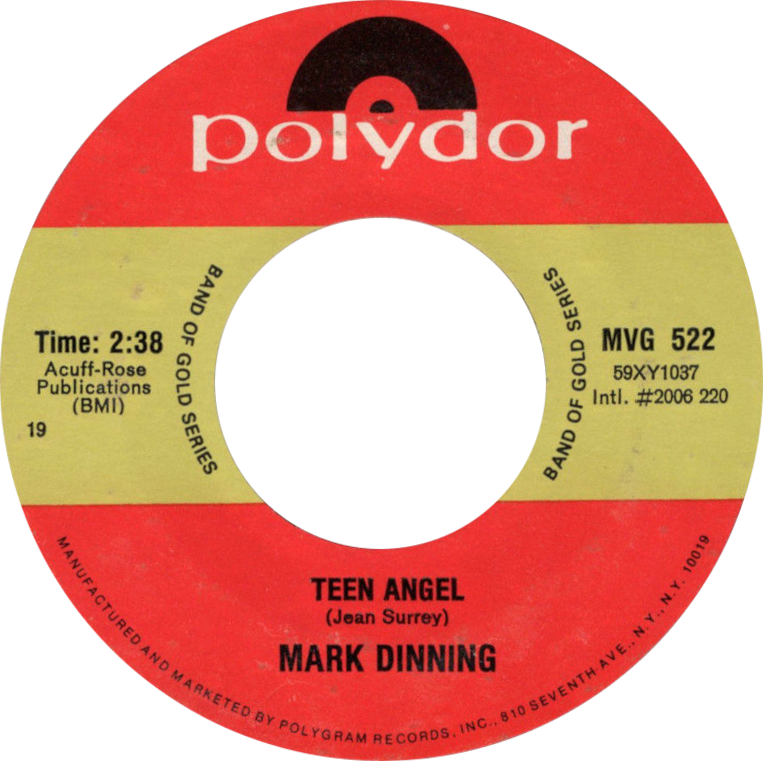
- US single re-release (Polydor)

Single by Mark Dinning

from the album Teen Angel
- B-side: "Bye Now Baby"
- Released: October 1959
- Studio: Bradley Studios (Nashville, Tennessee)
- Genre: Pop
- Length: 2:42
- Label: MGM
- Songwriters: Jean Surrey, Red Surrey
- Producer: Jim Vienneau

Mark Dinning singles chronology
"Teen Angel" (1959)	"A Star Is Born (A Love Has Died)" (1960)

"Teen Angel" is a teenage tragedy song written by Jean Dinning and her husband, Red Surrey. Recorded at Bradley Studios in Nashville, Tennessee, The song was performed by Jean's brother, Mark Dinning, and released in October 1959.

The record was not an instant success, with some radio stations in the U.S. banning the song, considering it too sad. Nevertheless, despite the reluctance of radio stations, the song continued to climb the charts. In the last week of 1959, the single jumped from #100 to #50 on the Billboard Hot 100 chart. It went on to reach #1 on the U.S. Billboard Hot 100 (February 1960) and #37 in the UK Singles Chart (even though it was banned from being played by the BBC). Billboard ranked it as the #5 song of 1960.

== Storyline ==
The song is about a girl and her boyfriend (the song's narrator) who go out for a ride together. He pulls her to safety when their car is stalled on a railroad track in the path of an oncoming train. But then she runs back to the car, and is killed in the collision. When her body is recovered, the narrator's high school class ring is in her hand, which was apparently the reason she ran back. The last verse ends with the lyrics: "I'll never kiss your lips again/They buried you today." The final line in the coda asks the Teen Angel to: "Answer me, please."

"Teen Angel" and its two predecessors at the Hot 100's top spot, "El Paso" by Marty Robbins and "Running Bear" by Johnny Preston, continued a string of pop tunes in which someone dies tragically.

== Notable covers ==
- UK artists Alex Murray and Garry Mills each separately covered "Teen Angel" in February 1960, issuing their versions in the UK at the same time as Dinning in an effort to have the UK hit with the song. Their versions both missed the charts, however, while Dinning's made it to #37 UK.
- In late 1960, Rolf Harris issued a parody with new lyrics called "Tame Eagle".
- American rock and roll revival act Sha Na Na performed "Teen Angel" at the 1969 Woodstock festival.
- In 1974, the Canadian band Wednesday released its own take on "Teen Angel" much like it had done with "Last Kiss". But rather than it being a remake of the original, the storyline of the 1974 version reverses the role. After losing his girlfriend some time before, the 16-year-old boy loses his life in the same manner as the girl in the 1960 song (and the song in this case is narrated by a group of the boy's friends, rather than an individual). Their version reached #79 in the U.S. and #16 in Canada.
- The song was included in a medley by Steve Goodman, who performed it along with "Tell Laura I Love Her" and "Laurie (Strange Things Happen)" in what he referred to as "dead girl songs".
- In 1991 to 2013 the Rock Bottom Remainders (a band of all best-selling authors) performed a version of Teen Angel with Stephen King on lead vocals and Dave Marsh entering in a prom dress spattered with ketchup. The audiences howled with laughter.

== Legacy ==
The original Mark Dinning recording is featured in the 1973 film American Graffiti (set in 1962); as a representative hit song of the era, has been re-released on numerous compilation albums including the 1984 Rhino LP Teenage Tragedies.

It is referenced in the book Travels with Charley: In Search of America by John Steinbeck and in the song "Gone for Good" by the Shins.

== Chart performance ==
=== Weekly charts ===
Chart (1959–60)	Peak position
U.S. Billboard Hot 100	1

=== All-time charts ===
Chart (1960)	Position
Italy	60
US Billboard Hot 100	469

== See also ==
- List of Billboard Hot 100 number-one songs of 1960
