= Ron Holden =

American R&B singer (1939–1997)

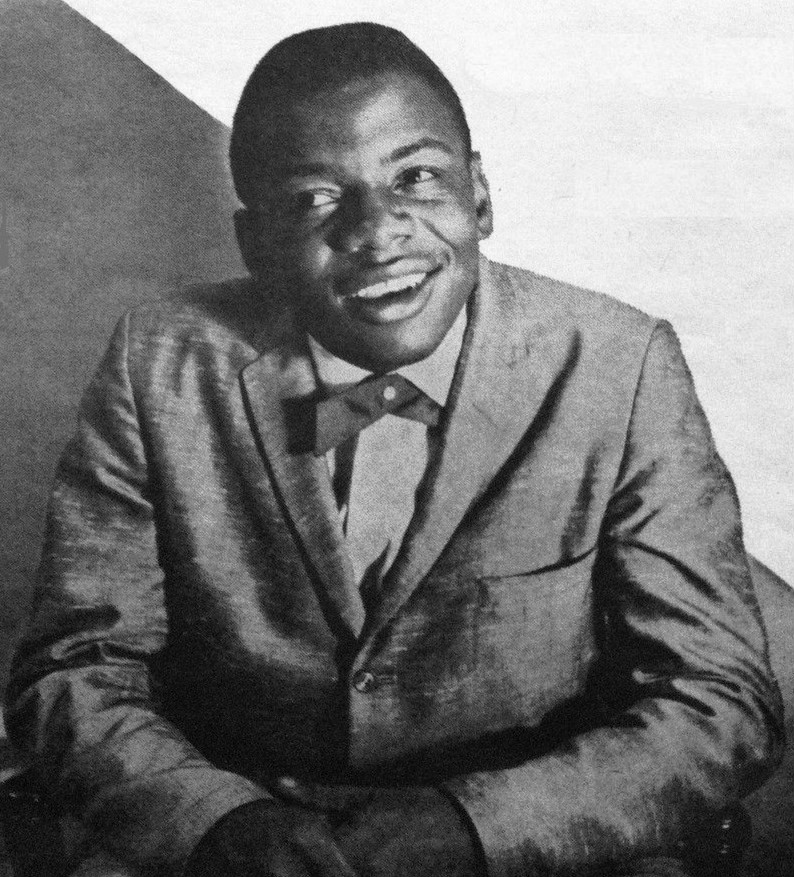
- Holden in 1960

Background information
- Born: Rolan Webster Holden; August 7, 1939; Seattle, Washington, US
- Died: January 22, 1997 (aged 57) Rosarito Beach, Baja California, Mexico
- Genres: R&B, pop, rock and roll
- Occupations: Singer, songwriter
- Instrument: Vocals
- Years active: 1958–1997
- Labels: Del-Fi Records, Donna Records
- Formerly of: The Playboys, Little Willie and the Thunderbirds, Ron Holden & Good News

Rolan Webster "Ron" Holden (August 7, 1939 – January 22, 1997) was an American pop and rhythm and blues singer from Seattle, Washington, United States. He appeared on The Lloyd Thaxton Show, Mike Douglas Show, American Bandstand (with Connie Francis, The Crests, Bobby Freeman and Conway Twitty) and The Dick Clark Show. He performed at the Apollo Theater with artists Jackie Wilson, the Crests and Redd Foxx. Most notable were USO tour-stops with Elvis Presley, Pat Boone and Connie Francis.

Between 1958 and 1965, Holden toured with Hank Ballard & The Midnighters, James Brown, Brook Benton, Etta James, Cleve Duncan & the Penguins, Rosie and the Originals, the 5 Royales, the Coasters, Freddy Cannon, the Crests, Marvin & Johnny, Don and Dewey, Big Joe Turner, Marv Johnson, Mickey & Silvia, Harvey Fuqua & the Moonglows, Jimmy Clanton, the Olympics, Donnie Brooks and Bill Haley.

In 1969, Holden, as singer/entertainer, formed a six piece rock and R&B band: Ron Holden & Good News. Good News performed at various clubs and festivals in the Seattle/Tacoma area for about eight months. The group members were Charles Jefferson (trumpet), Bob Cozzetti (trumpet), Tim Gemmill (tenor saxophone & flute), Steve Swartz (drums), Toby Cyer (electric guitar) and Bruce Ransom (electric bass & guitar). Influences included James Brown, Chicago and Blood, Sweat & Tears.

== History ==
Holden was discovered by Larry Nelson, who had just left work as a police officer to start his own record label. Holden spread the rumor that he had been heard singing by Nelson while being held in the King County jail after being arrested for marijuana and alcohol possession, but the story has not been confirmed. In 1959, Holden recorded the single "Love You So", which became a hit in the U.S., peaking at No. 11 on the US Billboard R&B chart and No. 7 on the Billboard Hot 100 in April 1960. Donna Records, owned by record company producer Bob Keane, bought the rights to Holden's recordings shortly after and issued a full LP entitled Love You So; this record was re-issued by Del-Fi Records in 1994. Holden returned to the charts in 1974 with "Can You Talk?" (U.S. R&B No. 49).

He died of a heart attack in Rosarito Beach, Baja California, Mexico in 1997.

== See also ==
- List of 1960s one-hit wonders in the United States
