= Mr. Custer =

Single by Larry Verne

from the album Mr. Larry Verne
- B-side: "Okeefenokee Two Step"
- Released: 1960
- Genre: Novelty
- Length: 3:04
- Label: Era
- Songwriters: Al De Lory; Fred Darian; Joseph Van Winkle

Larry Verne singles chronology
"Mr. Custer" (1960)	"Mr. Livingston" (1960)

"Mr. Custer" is a march novelty song, sung by Larry Verne, and written by Al De Lory, Fred Darian, and Joseph Van Winkle.

== Background ==
It is a comical song about a soldier's plea to General Custer before the climactic Battle of the Little Bighorn against the Sioux, to allow him to stay behind, because he had a bad dream about the battle.

== Chart performance ==
It was a number-one song in the United States in 1960, topping the Billboard Hot 100 singles chart for the issue dated October 10, 1960, and remained there for one week. On the US Hot R&B Sides chart, it went to number 9. It reached number 12 in Canada, also October 10, 1960.

== Reception ==
In a retrospective review for his Number Ones column in 2018, Stereogum writer Tom Breihan panned the song, giving it one star out of ten while calling it "offensive", "morally wrongheaded", and "unlistenable musically".

== Chart history ==
=== Weekly charts ===
Larry Verne

Chart (1960)	Peak position
Canada CHUM Chart	12
U.S. Billboard Hot 100	1
U.S. Billboard Hot R&B Sides	9
U.S. Cash Box Top 100	3

Charlie Drake

Chart (1960–61)	Peak position
New Zealand (Lever Hit Parade)	7
UK Singles (OCC)	12

Ted Lune

Chart (1960)	Peak position
New Zealand (Lever Hit Parade)	4

=== Year-end charts ===
Chart (1960)	Rank
U.S. Billboard Hot 100	42
U.S. Cash Box	26

== Sequel ==
A follow-up record, "Return of Mr. Custer (Please Mr. Sittin' Bull)", was released in 1964, which used the same melody and music arrangement, but it failed to chart.

== Cover versions ==
- La Mesa California band "The Search" covered this in 1967.
- "Mr. Custer" was also a number-12 success in the UK Singles Chart for Charlie Drake in 1960, his third such chart hit.
- Novelty/country singer-songwriter Ray Stevens covered the song for his 1969 album Gitarzan.

== See also ==
- List of Hot 100 number-one singles of 1960 (U.S.)
