= He'll Have to Go =

Single by Jim Reeves

from the album He'll Have to Go and Other Favorites
- B-side: "In a Mansion Stands My Love"
- Released: November 1959 (U.S.)
- Recorded: October 15, 1959
- Studio: RCA Studio B, Nashville
- Genre: Country, Nashville sound
- Length: 2:20
- Label: RCA Victor
- Songwriters: Joe Allison, Audrey Allison
- Producer: Chet Atkins

Jim Reeves singles chronology
"Partners" (1959)	"He'll Have to Go" (1959)	"I'm Gettin' Better" (1960)

"He'll Have to Go" is a song recorded on October 15, 1959, by Jim Reeves. The song, released in the fall of 1959, went on to become a hit on both the country and pop charts early in 1960.

== Background ==
The song is about a man who is talking by telephone to the woman he loves, when he realizes that another man is with her. The song was written by the husband-and-wife team of Joe and Audrey Allison, and was inspired by a phone conversation between them in which they had trouble making themselves understood. Because of background noise and Audrey Allison's naturally soft voice, her husband had to ask her to put her mouth very close to the receiver. That led her to pen the song's first line.

Reeves recorded the song after listening to the original version of it by singer Billy Brown. When Brown's version attracted little attention, Reeves felt free to record his own. It was released to country radio as the B-side of "In a Mansion Stands My Love", which some music executives considered a stronger song. However, "Mansion" failed to catch on, and disc jockeys began playing the B-side, instead. Before long, "He'll Have to Go" became a huge country and pop hit. Several rhythm and blues radio stations played the song, too.

The recording features a small group of musicians: Floyd Cramer on piano, Marvin Hughes on the vibraphone, Bob Moore on bass, Buddy Harman on drums, Hank Garland on guitar, and the Anita Kerr Singers providing the background vocals.

The first verse set the tone: "Put your sweet lips a little closer to the phone/Let's pretend that we're together all alone/I'll tell the man to turn the juke box way down low/And you can tell your friend there with you he'll have to go."

Country music historian Bill Malone noted that "He'll Have to Go" in most respects represented a conventional country song, but its arrangement and the vocal chorus "put this recording in the country pop vein." In addition, Malone lauded Reeves' vocal styling - lowered to "its natural resonant level" to project the "caressing style that became famous" - as being why "many people refer to him as the singer with the velvet touch."

== Chart performance ==
The song reached number two on the Billboard Hot 100 in early 1960, kept from the top spot by Percy Faith's "Theme from A Summer Place". Billboard ranked it as the number-two song of the year for 1960. The song also reached number one on the Hot Country Singles chart on February 8, 1960, where it remained for 14 consecutive weeks. The song was one of just five different titles to occupy the chart's summit during 1960. In addition, it reached number 13 on the rhythm and blues singles chart.

In Canada, the song was number one for six weeks on the pop charts. It also had success abroad, reaching number one on the Australian singles chart and number 12 on the UK Singles Chart.

Chart (1960)	Peak position
Australia Singles Chart	1
Canadian Singles Chart	1
Norwegian Singles Chart	1
Italy (FIMI)	34
U.S. Billboard Hot C&W Sides	1
U.S. Billboard Hot 100	2
UK Singles Chart	12
U.S. Billboard Hot R&B Singles	13

== Other versions ==
"He'll Have to Go" has been recorded by many other artists. Elvis Presley recorded his version of "He'll Have to Go" on October 31, 1976, at his last known studio recording session; it is believed to be the final song he ever recorded in a studio setting.

The song prompted the answer song "He'll Have to Stay" by Jeanne Black. Her song reached No. 6 on the Billboard Hot C&W Sides chart and No. 4 on the Billboard Hot 100 in 1960.

Les Paul and Mary Ford recorded the song as "She'll Have to Go" for their 1962 album Bouquet of Roses.

Tom Jones recorded a version for his 1967 album Green, Green Grass of Home.

Country music satirists Homer and Jethro parodied the song on their 1962 live album Homer and Jethro at the Convention.

Barry Young reached No. 68 in Canada with his version in 1966.

Guitarist Ry Cooder recorded a version with a Mexican norteño-style arrangement for his 1976 album Chicken Skin Music.

Solomon Burke had a crossover hit with his 1964 version of the song on the US Adult Contemporary and R&B charts.

Bryan Ferry recorded the song in 1977, but it remained unreleased until 1988 when it was included on the album The Ultimate Collection.

Elton John has performed the song several times live, during a variety of solo tours and television appearances, and at various stops on his 1979 tour with Ray Cooper, including the series of shows the two played at the Rossya Hall in Moscow, Russia, the last night of which was broadcast live on BBC Radio.

UB40 recorded the song for their 2013 album Getting Over the Storm.

The song has also been covered by Joe Pesci, Scottish rocker Frankie Miller, English pop band Prefab Sprout and English rock band the Quireboys.

In 2023, He'll Have to Go, an independent short film named after the song was released and won the Finalist Award at the SWIFF International Film Festival for Best Short Film.
