= Mark Wynter =

English singer (born 1943)

- Born: Terence Sidney Lewis; 29 January 1943 (age 83); Woking, Surrey, England
- Occupations: Singer, actor
- Years active: 1960–Present
- Website: markwynter.com

Terence Sidney Lewis (born 29 January 1943), professionally known as Mark Wynter, is an English singer and actor, who had four Top 20 singles in the 1960s, including "Venus in Blue Jeans" and "Go Away Little Girl". He enjoyed a lengthy career from 1960 to 1968 as a pop singer and teen idol, and developed later into an actor in film, musicals and plays.

== Career ==
With his early musical career on a proper footing, Lewis decided to change his name to lessen the confusion with the American comedian, Jerry Lewis.

Wynter was entered as one of the contenders for the UK's place in the Eurovision Song Contest in 1961, with "Dream Girl", but finished fourth behind The Allisons.

Wynter's cover version of the American hit by Jimmy Clanton, "Venus in Blue Jeans" (1962), was his biggest success. Although he recorded a number of singles for the Decca and Pye labels in the UK, he made few albums. Some recorded material came to light in 2004 when Wynter discovered old tapes.

On 8 April 1968 Wynter escaped from a burning Boeing 707 aircraft, BOAC Flight 712, upon which he had been a passenger, and which had exploded shortly after landing back at Heathrow Airport following a fire in its number 2 engine, killing five people, including stewardess Barbara Jane Harrison, who was posthumously awarded the George Cross.

In 1970, Wynter sang the song "Say Hello to Yesterday" which was played during the closing credits of the film with the same name.

Wynter played the leading role in Conduct Unbecoming for more than a year at the Queen's Theatre in London, and for six months in Australia. He appeared with Julia McKenzie in On the Twentieth Century, and in Charley's Aunt. He also starred in Side By Side By Sondheim in Toronto, Chichester, and on the UK tour. In the 1982 Chichester Festival season he acted in several plays including On The Rocks and Henry V, and also sang in Valmouth. His other work in musicals during the 1980s included the role of the King in a revival of The King and I, the title roles in Hans Andersen and Barnum, the 1986 revival of Charlie Girl with Cyd Charisse and Paul Nicholas in London, and the part of Robert Browning in Robert and Elizabeth. During the 1990s Wynter spent two years in Cats, and was also seen as the Phantom and M. Andre in The Phantom of the Opera, and starred as Vittorio opposite Bonnie Langford in the 1998 West End revival of Sweet Charity. He has appeared frequently in the rest of the UK and portrayed Emile de Becque in a UK national tour of South Pacific. In 1994 he created the role of Van Helsing in the studio recording of the opera/musical "Nosferatu" by Bernard J. Taylor.

In 1981 Wynter succeeded Peter Davison as the presenter of the children's television series Once Upon a Time. During the early 1990s he presented daytime shows on BBC Radio 2, as well as documentaries such as "Happy Times", a programme about the American entertainer Danny Kaye, which was nominated for a New York radio award.

Wynter was still working actively and successfully in theatre throughout the English speaking world well into the 1990s. Although his Decca singles output is scattered in the CD catalogue, in 2000 Castle Communications released Go Away Little Girl: The Pye Anthology, a double album compiling his complete output for the label. In 2007, Wynter toured the UK in a number of plays and musicals.

Wynter toured in plays for producer Bill Kenwright, and pop tours for The Flying Music Company. A triple CD of Wynter's back catalogue was issued in 2017.

In 2017, Wynter went on a UK tour with The Solid Gold Rock'n'Roll Show, which also featured Eden Kane, Marty Wilde and Mike Berry.

== Personal life ==
Wynter now lives in Sussex. He is married to Emma, and has three children.

== Singles ==
- 1960: "Image of a Girl" / "Glory of Love" (UK number 11)
- 1960: "Kickin' Up the Leaves" (Bart) / "That's What I Thought" (UK number 24)
- 1961: "Dream Girl" / "Two Little Girls" (UK number 27)
- 1961: "Exclusively Yours" / "Warm and Willing" (UK number 32)
- 1961: "Girl for Ev'ry Day" / "The Best Time for Love"
- 1962: "Heaven's Plan" / "In Your Heart"
- 1962: "Angel Talk" / "I Love Her Still"
- 1962: "Venus in Blue Jeans" (Greenfield/Keller) / "Please Come Back to Me" (UK number 4)
- 1962: "Go Away Little Girl" / "That Kinda Talk" (UK number 6)
- 1963: "Aladdin's Lamp" / "It Can Happen Any Day"
- 1963: "Shy Girl" / "Because of You" (UK number 28)
- 1963: "Running to You" / "Don't Cry"
- 1963: "It's Almost Tomorrow" / "Music to Midnight" (UK number 12)
- 1964: "The Boy You're Kissin'" / "I Learned a Lot from You"
- 1964: "Only You (And You Alone)" / "It's Love You Want" (Wynter) (UK number 38)
- 1964: "Answer Me" / "I Wish You Everything"
- 1964: "Love Hurts" / "Can't Help Forgiving You" (DeShannon/Sheeley)
- 1964: "Forever and a Day" / "And I Love Her"
- 1965: "Can I Get to Know You Better" / "Am I Living a Dream" (Wynter)
- 1965: "Someday You'll Want Me to Want You" / "Here Comes"

== Filmography ==
Year	Title	Role	Notes
1963	Just for Fun	Mark	
1964	Just for You	Self	
1969	The Haunted House of Horror	Gary Scott	
1976	Red	Troubadour	Short
1978	Superman	Mate	

== See also ==
- List of artists who reached number one on the Australian singles chart
