= Jack Scott (singer) =

Canadian-American singer and songwriter (1936–2019)

Background information
- Born: Giovanni Domenico Scafone Jr. January 24, 1936; Windsor, Ontario, Canada
- Origin: Hazel Park, Michigan, U.S.
- Died: December 12, 2019 (aged 83) Warren, Michigan, U.S.
- Genres: Rockabilly; rock and roll; pop; country; country rock
- Occupations: Musician; songwriter
- Instruments: Guitar; vocals
- Years active: 1957–2019
- Labels: ABC-Paramount; Carlton; London; Top Rank; Capitol; RCA; Jubilee; Groove; Harvest

Jack Scott (born Giovanni Domenico Scafone, Jr.; January 24, 1936 – December 12, 2019) was a Canadian-American singer and songwriter. He was best known for his string of country music and rockabilly hits in the late 1950s and early 1960s. Scott was inducted into the Michigan Rock and Roll Legends Hall of Fame in 2007 and the Canadian Songwriters Hall of Fame in 2011.

== Early life ==
Scott was born in Windsor, Ontario, Canada, to Italian-American parents. He spent his early childhood in Windsor, across the river from Detroit, Michigan. When he was 10, his family moved to Hazel Park, a Detroit suburb. He grew up listening to hillbilly music and was taught to play the guitar by his mother, Laura.

== Career ==
As a teenager, Scott pursued a singing career and recorded as "Jack Scott". At the age of 18, he formed the Southern Drifters. After leading the band for three years, he signed to ABC-Paramount Records as a solo artist in 1957. A songwriter as well as a singer, Scott wrote the vast majority of his hits, though his repetoire also included covers of classic gospel, country and early rock and roll songs.

After recording two good-selling local hits for ABC-Paramount in 1957, he switched to the Carlton record label and had a double-sided national hit in 1958 with "Leroy" (No. 11) / "My True Love" (No. 3). The record sold over one million copies, earning Scott his first gold disc. Later in 1958, "With Your Love" (No. 28) reached the Top 40. In all, six of 12 songs on his first album became hit singles. On most of these tracks, he was backed up by the vocal group the Chantones.

He served in the United States Army during most of 1959, just after "Goodbye Baby" (No. 8) made the Top Ten. 1959 also saw him chart with "The Way I Walk" (No. 35). Most of his Carlton master tapes were believed lost or destroyed until Rollercoaster Records in England released a vinyl EP, "Jack Scott Rocks", and CD, The Way I Walk, which were for the most part mastered from original tapes rather than the disc dubs used for previous reissues.

At the beginning of 1960, Scott again changed record labels, this time to Top Rank Records. He then recorded four Billboard Hot 100 hits – "What in the World's Come Over You" (No. 5), "Burning Bridges" (No. 3) b/w "Oh Little One" (No. 34), and "It Only Happened Yesterday" (No. 38). "What in the World's Come Over You" was Scott's second gold disc winner. Scott continued to record and perform during the 1960s and 1970s. His song "You're Just Gettin' Better" reached the country charts in 1974. In May 1977, he recorded a Peel session for BBC Radio 1 disc jockey John Peel.

Scott released his penultimate album in 1995, a live set recorded with British band the Class of '58 while headlining at the 1994 Rockhouse Festival in the Netherlands.

In 2007, Jack Scott was voted into the Michigan Rock and Roll Legends Hall of Fame. In 2011, he was inducted into the Canadian Songwriters Hall of Fame.

Scott's final album, the studio album Way to Survive was released in 2015.

== Later life and death ==
Scott lived most of his life in Hazel Park, Michigan, before moving to nearby Sterling Heights in his later years. He suffered a heart attack on December 6, 2019, and died six days later at St. John Macomb Hospital in Warren, Michigan, aged 83.

== Discography ==
=== Albums ===
Year	Album
1959	Jack Scott (Carlton 12–107)
1960	I Remember Hank Williams (Top Rank RM319)
1960	What in the World's Come Over You (Top Rank RM326)
1960	What Am I Living For (Carlton 12–122)
1960	The Spirit Moves Me (Top Rank RM348)
1964	Burning Bridges (Capitol T2035)
1995	Jack Scott Live with The Class of '58 (Rockhouse ROCKCD 9504)
2015	Way to Survive (Bluelight BLR 33176)

=== Singles ===
Year	Single (A-side, B-side) Both sides from same album except where indicated	Chart Positions						Album
Year	Single (A-side, B-side) Both sides from same album except where indicated	US	US R&B	US Country	CAN CHUM	CAN Country	UK	Album
1957	"Baby, She's Gone" b/w "You Can Bet Your Bottom Dollar"	—	—	—	—	—	—	What Am I Living For
1957	"Two Timin' Woman" b/w "I Need Your Love"	—	—	—	—	—	—	What Am I Living For
1958	"My True Love" /	3	5	—	1	—	9	Jack Scott
1958	"Leroy"	11	5	—	15	—	—	Jack Scott
1958	"With Your Love" /	28	—	—	18	—	—	Jack Scott
1958	"Geraldine"	96	—	—	—	—	—	Jack Scott
1958	"Goodbye Baby" /	8	—	—	3	—		Jack Scott
1958	"Save My Soul"	73	—	—	3	—	—	Jack Scott
1959	"I Never Felt Like This" /	78	—	—	38	—	—	What Am I Living For
1959	"Bella"	—	—	—	38	—	—	
1959	"The Way I Walk"	35	—	—	31	—	30	Jack Scott
1959	"Midgie"	—	—	—	43	—	—	
1959	"There Comes A Time" b/w "Baby Marie"	71	—	—	44	—	—	What Am I Living For
1960	"What in the World's Come Over You" b/w "Baby, Baby"	5	7	—	2	—	11	What in the World's Come Over You
1960	"Burning Bridges" /	3	5	—	2	—	32	What in the World's Come Over You
1960	"Oh, Little One"	34	—	—	2	—	—	What in the World's Come Over You
1960	"What Am I Living For" b/w "Indiana Waltz" (from Jack Scott)	—	—	—	—	—	—	What Am I Living For
1960	"It Only Happened Yesterday" /	38	—	—	4	—	—	Burning Bridges
1960	"Cool Water"	85	—	—	4	—	—	Burning Bridges
1960	"No One Will Ever Know" b/w "Go Wild Little Sadie"	—	—	—	—	—	—	Non-album tracks
1960	"Patsy" b/w "Old Time Religion" (from The Spirit Moves Me)	65	—	—	18	—	—	Burning Bridges
1961	"Is There Something On Your Mind" b/w "I Found A Woman" (Non-album track)	89	—	—	—	—	—	Burning Bridges
1961	"A Little Feeling (Called Love)" b/w "Now That I" (Non-album track)	91	—	—	—	—	—	Burning Bridges
1961	"My Dream Come True" b/w "Strange Desire" (Non-album track)	83	—	—	—	—	—	Burning Bridges
1961	"Steps One And Two" b/w "One Of These Days" (Non-album track)	86	—	—	—	—	—	Burning Bridges
1961	"If Only" b/w "Green Green Valley"	—	—	—	—	—	—	Non-album tracks
1962	"Cry Cry Cry" b/w "Grizzily Bear"	—	—	—	—	—	—	Non-album tracks
1962	"The Part Where I Cry" b/w "You Only See What You Wanna See"	—	—	—	—	—	—	Non-album tracks
1962	"Sad Story" b/w "I Can't Hold Your Letters (In My Arms)"	—	—	—	—	—	—	Non-album tracks
1963	"Laugh and The World Laughs With You" b/w "Strangers" (Non-album track)	—	—	—	—	—	—	Burning Bridges
1963	"All I See Is Blue" b/w "Meo Myo"	—	—	—	—	—	—	Burning Bridges
1963	"There's Trouble Brewin'" b/w "Jingle Bells Slide"	—	—	—	—	—	—	Non-album tracks
1964	"I Knew You First" b/w "Blue Skies (Moving In On Me)"	—	—	—	—	—	—	Non-album tracks
1964	"What A Wonderful Night Out" b/w "Wiggle On Out"	—	—	—	—	—	—	Non-album tracks
1964	"Thou Shalt Not Steal" b/w "I Prayed For An Angel"	—	—	—	—	—	—	Non-album tracks
1964	"Tall Tales" b/w "Flakey John"	—	—	—	—	—	—	Non-album tracks
1965	"I Don't Believe In Tea Leaves" b/w "Separation's Now Granted"	—	—	—	—	—	—	Non-album tracks
1965	"Don't Hush The Laughter" b/w "Let's Learn To Live and Love Again"	—	—	—	—	—	—	Non-album tracks
1965	"I Hope I Think I Wish" b/w "Looking For Linda"	—	—	—	—	—	—	Non-album tracks
1966	"Before The Bird Flies" b/w "Insane"	—	—	—	—	—	—	Non-album tracks
1967	"My Special Angel" b/w "I Keep Changing My Mind"	—	—	—	—	—	—	Non-album tracks
1970	"Billy Jack" b/w "Mary Marry Me"	—	—	—	—	—	—	Non-album tracks
1973	"May You Never Be Alone" b/w "Face To The Wall"	—	—	—	—	—	—	Non-album tracks
1974	"You're Just Gettin' Better" b/w "As You Take A Walk Through My Mind"	—	—	92	—	—	—	Non-album tracks
1992	"Burning Bridges" (with Carroll Baker)	—	—	—	—	55	—	Non-album tracks

== See also ==
- List of Canadian musicians
- Music of Detroit
