= Jeanne Black =

American country music and pop singer (1937–2014)

- Born: Gloria Jeanne Black; October 25, 1937; Pomona, California, U.S.
- Died: October 23, 2014 (aged 76) Orem, Utah, U.S.
- Genres: Rock and roll, country, pop
- Occupation: Singer
- Instrument: Vocals
- Years active: 1956–late 1960s
- Labels: Capitol Records

Gloria Jeanne Black (October 25, 1937 – October 23, 2014) was an American country music singer.

== Life and career ==
Gloria Jeanne Black was born on October 25, 1937, in Pomona, California.

She first gained wide exposure singing on Cliffie Stone's television program Hometown Jamboree, from 1956 to 1959. Following this, she sang in Nevada, on the Las Vegas Strip and in Tahoe. She signed with Capitol Records in 1960 and released the single "He'll Have to Stay" later that year. The song, which was an answer record to Jim Reeves's hit "He'll Have to Go", was a hit in the US. The song peaked at No. 11 on the R&B Singles chart, No. 6 on the Country chart, and No. 4 on the Billboard Hot 100 chart. The song reached No. 41 in the UK Singles Chart and sold over one million copies globally, earning gold disc status. Black was unable to repeat the success of the single, and is sometimes regarded as a "one-hit wonder."

== Personal life ==
Black was the sister of country music singer Janie Black.

Black was married to actor and director Mark Shipley. Together they had six children; Eric, Laurel, Angela, Jared, Josh and Tannie Shipley.

After her marriage to Shipley, Black married guitarist and songwriter Billy Strange. She died on October 23, 2014, two days before her 77th birthday.

== Discography ==
=== Albums ===
Year	Album	Record label
1960	A Little Bit Lonely	Capitol Records

=== Singles ===
Year	Title	Peak chart positions				Record Label	B-side	Album
Year	Title	US	Country	R&B	UK	Record Label	B-side	Album
1960	"He'll Have to Stay"	4	6	11	41	Capitol Records	"Under Your Spell Again"	A Little Bit Lonely
1960	"Lisa"	43	—	—	—	Capitol Records	"Journey of Love"	A Little Bit Lonely
1960	"You'll Find Out"	—	—	—	—	Capitol Records	"Sleep Walkin'"	
1960	"Oh, How I Miss You Tonight"	63	—	—	—	Capitol Records	"A Little Bit Lonely"	
1961	"Don't Speak to Me"	—	—	—	—	Capitol Records	"When You're Alone"	
1961	"The Commandments of Love"	—	—	—	—	Capitol Records	"Jimmy Love"	
1961	"Heartbreak U.S.A."	—	—	—	—	Capitol Records	"His Own Little Island"	
1962	"Guessin' Again"	—	—	—	—	Capitol Records	"A Letter to Anya"	

== See also ==
- List of 1960s one-hit wonders in the United States
- List of Capitol Records artists
