= A Million to One =

Single by Jimmy Charles and the Revellettes
- B-side: "Hop Scotch Hop"
- Released: May 1960
- Length: 2:28
- Label: Promo (P-1002)
- Songwriter: Phil Medley

Jimmy Charles and the Revellettes singles chronology
"A Million to One" (1960)	"The Age of Love" (1960)

"A Million to One" is a song written by Phil Medley and first recorded by Jimmy Charles and the Revellettes.

== Chart history ==
The single, released by Promo Records (P-1002), peaked at number five on the U.S. Billboard Hot 100 singles chart.

Chart (1960)	Peak position
U.S. Billboard Hot 100	5
U.S. Billboard Hot R&B Sides	8

== Covers ==
"A Million to One" has been covered by many artists and some versions appeared on the Billboard Hot 100 (peak positions indicated below).

- Patti Austin (1967)
- Five Stairsteps (1968) – No. 68
- Brian Hyland (1969) – No. 90
- The Manhattans (1972) - No. 114
- Donny Osmond (1973) – No. 23
- Jermaine Jackson (1973)
- J. R. Bailey (1977)
- Selena (1986)
- New Edition (1986)
