= Jean Dinning =

American musician

- Born: Eugenia Doy Dinning; March 29, 1924; Grant County, Oklahoma, United States
- Died: February 22, 2011 (aged 86); Garden Grove, California, United States
- Occupation: Singer-songwriter
- Spouse(s): Howard Mack (divorced); Red Surrey (divorced); Joel Beasley (widowed 1994)

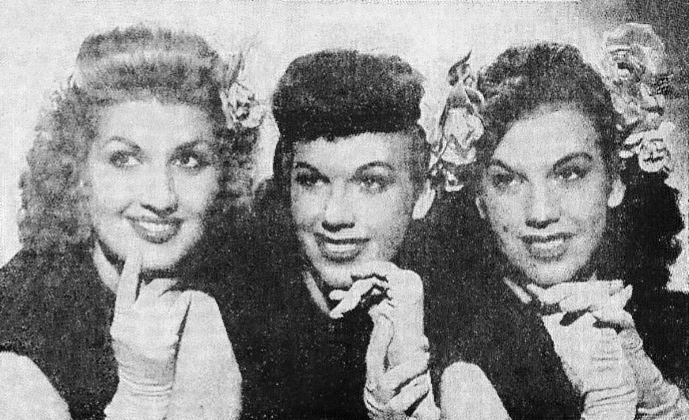
The Dinning Sisters in June 23, 1945 issue of Billboard magazine.

Jean Dinning (March 29, 1924 – February 22, 2011) was an American singer and songwriter, best known for co-writing, with her then-husband, Red Surrey, the 1959 hit song "Teen Angel", the most popular version of which was sung by her brother Mark Dinning.

== Personal life ==
Born Eugenia Doy Dinning, she was one of nine children. In the 1940s, she had several hits as a member of The Dinning Sisters. At the time of her death, she left two surviving Dinning siblings, (Virginia, a.k.a. "Ginger", and Dolores, a.k.a. "Tootsie").

== Death ==
She died on February 22, 2011, aged 86, in Garden Grove, California.
