= Cradle of Love (Johnny Preston song) =

Single by Johnny Preston

from the album Come Rock With Me
- B-side: "City of Tears"
- Released: 1960
- Genre: Rock and roll
- Length: 2:20
- Label: Mercury
- Songwriters: Jack Fautheree & Wayne Gray

Johnny Preston singles chronology
"Running Bear" (1959)	"Cradle of Love" (1960)	"Feel So Fine" (1960)

"Cradle of Love" is a song released in 1960 by Johnny Preston written by Jack Fautheree & Wayne Gray.

== Background ==
The lyrics of "Cradle of Love" quote several well known nursery rhymes with variations that tie them to the song's title. The song's chorus quotes Rock-a-bye Baby, the first verse quotes Jack Be Nimble, the second verse quotes Hey Diddle Diddle, and the third verse quotes Jack and Jill.

== Chart performance ==
- In the US, the song spent 15 weeks on the Billboard Hot 100 chart, peaking at No. 7, and No. 15 on Billboard's Hot R&B Sides.
- Outside the US, it went to No. 2 in the United Kingdom, No. 4 on Canada's CHUM Hit Parade, No. 5 on Norway's VG-lista, No. 7 in Australia, and No. 15 in Japan.

Chart (1960)	Peak position
Australia	7
Canada (CHUM Hit Parade)	4
Flanders	6
Japan	15
Netherlands	19
Norway (VG-lista)	5
UK Record Retailer	2
UK New Musical Express	2
US Billboard Hot 100	7
US Billboard Hot R&B Sides	15
US Cash Box Top 100	6
US Cash Box Records Disc Jockeys Played Most	6
US Cash Box Top Ten Juke Box Tunes	5
Wallonia	10

== Cover versions ==
- Using the name "Bobby Stevens", Ray Pilgrim recorded a version of the song in 1960.
- Ronnie & Robyn (then Detroit-area high-school kids, b. respectively Robert Arquette and JoAnn Casey) recorded a forceful arrangement in 1966 on HBR 489.
