= Larry Verne =

American novelty song artist (1936-2013)

- Born: Larry Vern Erickson; February 8, 1936; Minneapolis, Minnesota, U.S.
- Died: October 8, 2013 (aged 77) Sylmar, California, U.S.
- Genres: Novelty songs
- Occupation: Singer
- Years active: 1960–1963
- Label: Era Records

Larry Vern Erickson (February 8, 1936 – October 8, 2013) was an American novelty song vocalist.

== Biography ==
Verne recorded two U.S. Billboard Hot 100 chart hit singles in 1960, "Mr. Livingston" (No. 75) and "Mr. Custer" (No. 1, and No. 9 R&B). "Mr. Custer" was written by Fred Darian, Al De Lory, and Joe Van Winkle. The record sold over one million copies, earning a gold disc. In the UK, "Mr. Custer" was successfully covered by Charlie Drake. "Mr. Custer" was featured on an album of novelty songs recorded by Verne called Mister... Larry Verne, which was released that same year.

After growing tired of the music industry, Verne quit to become a successful builder of Hollywood film sets, which he did for 35 years before retiring.

== Death ==
Verne died on October 8, 2013, of heart failure in Sylmar, California, at the age of 77. He had long suffered from Alzheimer's disease and had suffered three strokes.

== Discography ==
=== Singles ===
Year	Title	Peak chart positions		Record Label	B-side	Album
Year	Title	US Pop	US R&B	Record Label	B-side	Album
1960	"Mr. Custer"	1	9	Era	"Okeefenokee Two Step"	Mr. Larry Verne
1960	"Mr. Livingston"	75	—	Era	"Roller Coaster"	Mr. Larry Verne
1961	"Abdul's Party"	113	—	Era	"Tubby Tilly"	
1961	"Charlie at the Bat"	—	—	Era	"Pow, Right in the Kisser"	
1961	"The Speck"	—	—	Era	"Beatnick"	
1962	"I'm a Brave Little Soldier"	—	—	Era	"Hoo-Ha"	
1962	"The Coward That Won the West"	—	—	Era	"The Porcupine Patrol"	
1964	"Return of Mr. Custer"	—	—	Era	"Running Through the Forest"	
