= Mark Dinning =

American pop singer (1933–1986)

- Born: Max Edward Dinning; August 17, 1933
- Died: March 22, 1986 (aged 52)
- Genres: Pop

Max Edward "Mark" Dinning (August 17, 1933 – March 22, 1986) was an American pop music singer.

In February 1960, the song "Teen Angel", written by his sister Jean (Eugenia) and her husband Red Surrey, reached number one on the Billboard Hot 100 singles chart. Jean and two of her sisters, Virginia and Lucille, comprised The Dinning Sisters, a popular singing trio in the 1940s. Additionally, Dinning is the uncle of Dean Dinning, bass guitarist for alternative rock band Toad the Wet Sprocket.

== Biography ==
Dinning was born in Manchester, Oklahoma, the youngest of nine children, and was raised on a farm near Nashville, Tennessee, after his family relocated from Kansas. He followed his sisters and pursued a career in country music and, in 1957, record producer Wesley Rose signed him to a recording contract as Mark Dinning.

His recording efforts met with limited success until 1959, when "Teen Angel" became a hit. The lyrics, which told of the death of a teenage girl, were deemed by British radio stations to be too morbid to be aired, but it reached number 37 on the UK Singles Chart. In the U.S., it reached number one on the Billboard charts in early February 1960. It sold over one million copies and was awarded a gold disc. He also was the original artist to record "What Will My Mary Say", a song later popularized by Johnny Mathis in 1963.

Dinning had an alcohol addiction, which restricted his performances, and caused promoters to stop booking him as he faded from public view. Although Dinning never duplicated the success of "Teen Angel", he had three minor hit records in the ensuing years.

Dinning continued performing until his death from a heart attack in Jefferson City, Missouri, at the age of 52 on March 22, 1986.

== Discography ==
=== Albums ===
- Teen Angel (MGM 3828, 1960)
- Wanderin′ (MGM 3855, 1960)

=== Singles ===
Year	Title	US Hot 100	US R&B	UK	AUS	Label
1957	"Shameful Ways"/"A Million Years Ago"	--	--	--	--	MGM 12447
1957	"When You're Tired of Breaking Other Hearts"/"School Fool"	--	--	--	--	MGM 12553
1958	"Do You Know (There's a Someone Who Loves You)"/"You Thrill Me (Through and Through)"	--	--	--	--	MGM 12691
1958	"The Blackeyed Gypsy"/"Secretly in Love with You"	--	--	--	--	MGM 12732
1959	"Cutie Cutie"/"A Life of Love"	--	--	--	--	MGM 12775
1959	"Teen Angel"/"Bye Now Baby"	1	5	37	3	MGM 12845
1960	"A Star Is Born (A Love Has Died)"/"You Win Again"	68	--	--	32	MGM 12888
1960	"The Lovin' Touch"/"Come Back to Me (My Love)"	84	--	--	--	MGM 12929
1960	"She Cried on My Shoulder"/"The World Is Getting Smaller"	--	--	--	--	MGM 12958
1961	"Top Forty, News, Weather and Sports"/"Suddenly (There's Only You)"	81	--	--	17	MGM 12980
1961	"Another Lonely Girl"/"Can't Forget"	--	--	--	--	MGM 13007
1961	"Lonely Island"/"Turn Me On"	--	--	--	--	MGM 13024
1961	"In a Matter of Moments"/"What Will My Mary Say?"	--	--	--	--	MGM 13048
1962	"All of This for Sally"/"The Pickup"	--	--	--	--	MGM 13061
1962	"I Catch Myself Cryin'"/"She's Changed"	--	--	--	--	MGM 13091
1964	"Joey"/"January"	--	--	--	--	Cameo 299
1965	"Dial AL 1-4883"/"I'm Glad We Fell in Love"	--	--	--	--	Hickory 1293
1966	"There Stands a Lady"/"The Last Rose"	--	--	--	--	Hickory 1368
1966	"He Reminds Me of Me"/"Run Opie Run"	--	--	--	--	Hickory 1404
1967	"It's Such a Pretty World Today"/"Atlanta Georgia Stray"	--	--	--	--	United Artists 50169
1968	"Throw a Little Love My Way"/"A Dissatisfied Man"	--	--	--	--	United Artists 50305
