= Johnny Preston =

American rock and roll singer (1939–2011)

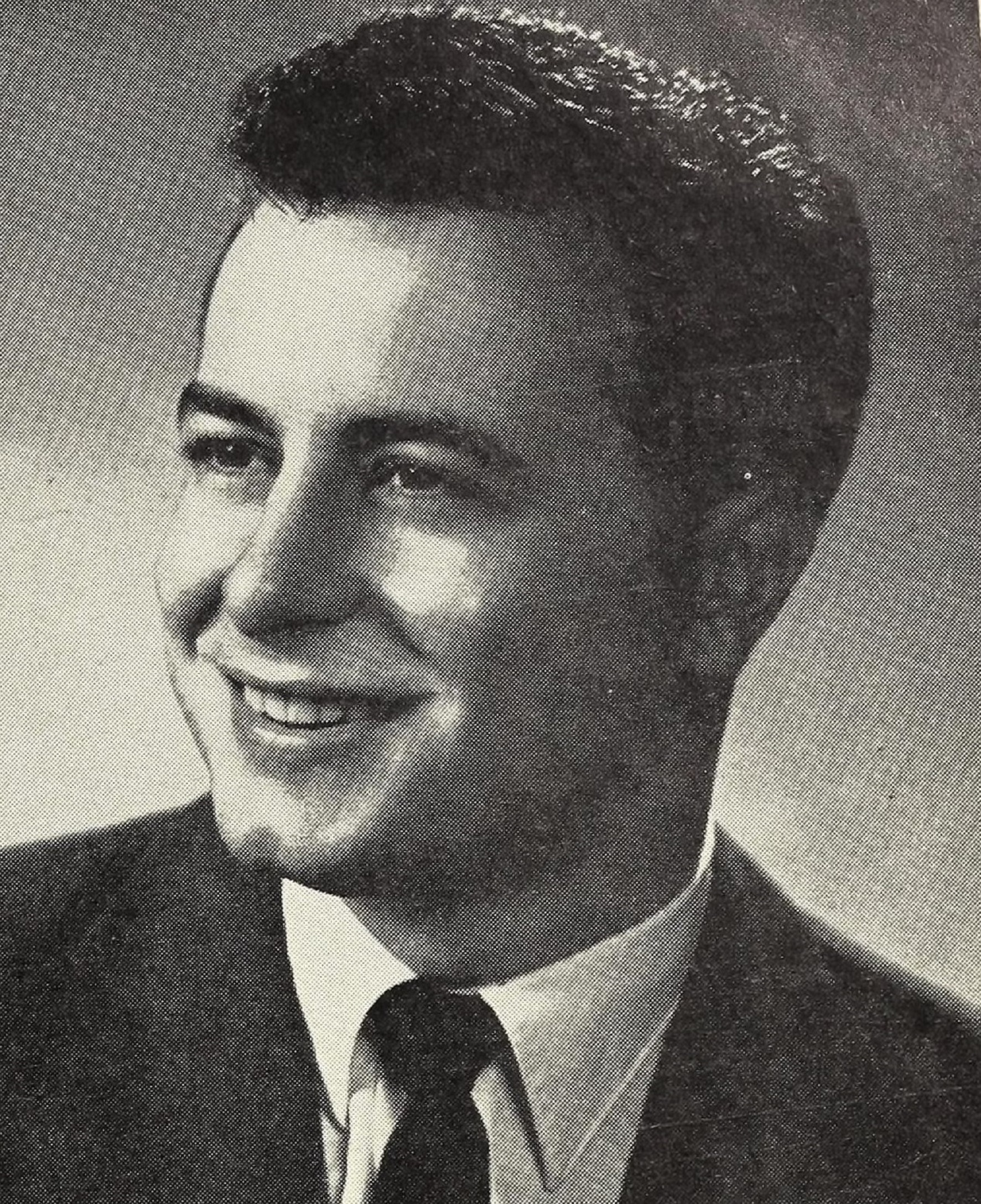
- Preston in 1960

Background information
- Born: John Preston Courville; August 18, 1939; Port Arthur, Texas, U.S.
- Died: March 4, 2011 (aged 71) Beaumont, Texas, U.S.
- Genres: Rock and roll
- Occupation: Singer
- Years active: 1950s–2009
- Labels: Mercury; Imperial; Kapp; TCF Hall; ABC

John Preston Courville (August 18, 1939 – March 4, 2011), known professionally as Johnny Preston, was an American rock and roll singer, best known for his 1959 international number one hit "Running Bear" and his 1960 hit “Cradle of Love”

== Life and career ==
Born in Port Arthur, Texas, of Cajun and German ancestry, Preston sang in high school choral contests throughout the state of Texas. He formed a rock and roll band called the Shades, who were seen performing at a local club by J. P. "The Big Bopper" Richardson.

Richardson offered Preston the chance to record a teenage tragedy song he had written, "Running Bear", which they did in Houston, Texas, in 1958. The "Indian" sounds on the record were performed by Richardson and George Jones. The record was released after the Big Bopper's death in the same plane crash that killed Buddy Holly and Ritchie Valens on February 3, 1959. It entered the U.S. Billboard Hot 100 in October 1959, reaching number one in January 1960 and remaining there for three weeks. It was a transatlantic chart-topper, reaching number one in the United Kingdom in March 1960. The sales of the record exceeded one million copies, earning Preston his first gold disc.

Preston quickly followed up with another hit called "Cradle of Love" (Billboard number 7, UK number 2), and made several other records during the early 1960s that met with modest success. "Cradle of Love" was a hit in both the UK Singles Chart and in Athens, Greece. Preston's "I'm Starting to Go Steady", a song on the flip side of "Feel So Fine", (Billboard number 14, UK number 18) was released in June 1960. "Leave My Kitten Alone", a song later made famous as part of The Beatles Anthology 1, was a minor hit for Preston. He later made appearances on American Bandstand (ABC-TV) and The Milt Grant Show and also The Buddy Deane Show (East Coast, United States).

Preston's pioneering contribution to the genre was recognized by the Rockabilly Hall of Fame. He also performed at Dick Clark's American Bandstand Theater in Branson, Missouri.

Preston had coronary artery bypass surgery in 2010. He died of heart failure in Beaumont, Texas, on March 4, 2011, at the age of 71, after years of heart-related illnesses. He was survived by his wife, Sharon, two sons and two daughters. Preston was buried at Oak Bluff Memorial Park in Port Neches, Texas. A tribute concert was performed on November 5, 2011, featuring guest artists Gene Bourgeois, Johnny Tillotson, Dickey Lee, and Chris Montez, along with Lamar State College - Port Arthur's touring band, under the direction of Aaron Horne.

== Discography ==
=== Albums ===
Year	Album	Record label
1960	Running Bear	Mercury Records
1960	Come Rock with Me	Mercury Records

=== Singles ===
Year	Title	Peak chart positions			Record label	B-side	Album
Year	Title	US	US R&B	UK	Record label	B-side	Album
1959	"Running Bear"	1	3	1	Mercury Records	"My Heart Knows"	Running Bear
1960	"Cradle of Love"	7	15	2	Mercury Records	"City of Tears"	Come Rock with Me
1960	"Feel So Fine"	14	–	18	Mercury Records	"I'm Starting to Go Steady" (UK number 49)	Come Rock with Me
1960	"Up in the Air"	–	–	–	Mercury Records	"Charming Billy" (US number 105, UK number 34)	
1960	"New Baby for Christmas"	–	–	–	Mercury Records	"(I Want A) Rock and Roll Guitar"	
1961	"Leave My Kitten Alone"	73	–	–	Mercury Records	"Token of Love"	Come Rock with Me
1961	"Willy Walk"	–	–	–	Mercury Records	"I Feel Good"	
1961	"Let Them Talk"	–	–	–	Mercury Records	"She Once Belonged to Me"	
1961	"Free Me"	97	–	–	Mercury Records	"Kissin' Tree"	
1962	"Let the Big Boss Man (Pull You Through)"	–	–	–	Mercury Records	"The Day After Forever"	
1962	"Let's Leave It That Way"	–	–	–	Mercury Records	"Broken Hearts Anonymous"	
1963	"This Little Bitty Tear (It's Gonna Dry)"	–	–	–	Imperial Records	"The Day the World Stood Still"	
1964	"All Around the World"	–	–	–	Hall-Way Records	"Just Plain Hurt"	
1965	"The Peddler Man"	–	–	–	Hall Records	"I'm Kicking Myself"	
1965	"Running Bear '65"	–	–	–	Hall Records	"Dedicated to the One I Love"	
1965	"Good Good Lovin'"	–	–	–	TCF Hall Records	"I'm Asking Forgiveness"	
1968	"I'm Only Human"	–	–	–	ABC Records	"There's No One Like You"	

== See also ==
- List of artists who reached number one in the United States
- List of artists who reached number one on the UK Singles Chart
- List of artists who reached number one on the Australian singles chart
- List of stage names
- List of Mercury Records artists
