= Go West Young Man (Bing Crosby album) =

Compilation album by Bing Crosby The Andrews Sisters
- Released: Original LP album: 1950; Original 45 album: 1950
- Recorded: 1945, 1947, 1949, 1950
- Genres: Popular, Western
- Length: 23:40
- Label: Decca

Bing Crosby The Andrews Sisters chronology
Songs from Mr. Music (w/ The Andrews Sisters and Dorothy Kirsten) (1950)	Go West Young Man (1950)	Collectors' Classics (set of 8 albums) (1951)

Go West Young Man is a compilation album of songs on one 10" vinyl record by Bing Crosby and The Andrews Sisters released in 1950 featuring songs that were sung by Crosby and the Sisters with a Western-type genre. This album is one of the first by Crosby to not be released on 78 rpm records before going straight to an LP or set of 45s. The album includes several songs which had already enjoyed Billboard chart success. “Along the Navajo Trail” reached the No. 2 position in 1945 and "One Hundred and Sixty Acres", "Have I Told You Lately That I Love You?" and "Quicksilver" also charted.

== Reception ==
The album itself was not reviewed but Billboard commented favorably on several of the tracks when they were issued as singles.

The tempo for "Along the Navajo Trail" was described by the magazine as being "geared to the slow blues and blending the hillbilly with the breakaway."

Billboard noted that "Go West, Young Man" included a light-hearted lyrical ribbing of the California Chamber of Commerce and "should hardly require a fanfare to make the hit grade." The song was from the film from “Copacabana".

"At the Flying “W”" was seen as a surefire Rhythm novelty whilst "A Hundred and Sixty Acres" brought the comments that the singers do full justice to a tune that is not of the same standard as 'At the Flying "W"'.

"Have I Told You Lately That I Love You" was remembered as being popular a couple of years previously as a hillbilly record and the reviewer says that the vocalists are in top form.

"Lock, Stock and Barrel" was felt to be a bit too sophisticated, but Ask Me No Questions is described as a relaxed harmony version which could be successful in both pop and country markets.

== Track listing ==
These previously issued songs were featured on one 10" LP album, Decca DL 5302. All the songs featured Bing Crosby and The Andrews Sisters with Vic Schoen and His Orchestra.

Side one
No.	Title	Writer(s)	Recording date	Length
1.	"Go West, Young Man"	Bert Kalmar, Harry Ruby	March 26, 1947	2:54
2.	"Along the Navajo Trail"	Dick Charles, Larry Markes, Edgar De Lange	June 29, 1945	2:45
3.	"Quicksilver"	George Wyle, Eddie Pola, Irving Taylor	November 25, 1949	2:45
4.	"Have I Told You Lately That I Love You?"	Scott Wiseman	November 25, 1949	3:16

Side two
No.	Title	Writer(s)	Recording date	Length
1.	"A Hundred and Sixty Acres"	Dave Kapp	December 17, 1947	2:37
2.	"At the Flying 'W'"	Allie Wrubel	December 17, 1947	2:49
3.	"Ask Me No Questions (And I'll Tell You No Lies)"	Robert Wells, David Saxon	February 15, 1950	3:15
4.	"Lock, Stock and Barrel"	Sammy Fain, Paul Francis Webster	February 15, 1950	3:19

== Other releases ==
In 1950, the same selections were released on a 4-disc set of 45 rpm records called Decca 9-152.
