= Don't Fence Me In (film) =

1945 film by John English

- Directed by: John English
- Written by: Dorrell McGowan; Stuart E. McGowan; John K. Butler
- Produced by: Donald H. Brown; Armand Schaefer
- Starring: Roy Rogers; George "Gabby" Hayes; Dale Evans; Robert Livingston
- Cinematography: William Bradford
- Edited by: Charles Craft; Richard L. Van Enger
- Music by: Mort Glickman; Morton Scott; R. Dale Butts
- Production company: Republic Pictures
- Distributed by: Republic Pictures
- Release date: October 20, 1945
- Running time: 71 minutes
- Country: United States
- Language: English

Don't Fence Me In is a 1945 American black-and-white Western film directed by John English and starring the "King of the Cowboys" Roy Rogers and his palomino Trigger, promoted in the production's opening credits and on theater posters as "The Smartest Horse in the Movies". Also featured in the film are Roy's sidekick George "Gabby" Hayes and Rogers' future wife Dale Evans. Produced and distributed by Republic Pictures, Don't Fence Me In is part of a long-running series of singing-cowboy films released by that company to showcase Rogers' musical talents and equestrian skills, as well as Trigger's abilities at performing impressive stunts and tricks.

== Plot ==
The plot is a contemporary one, set in the United States in 1945. Toni Ames (Dale Evans), a "big-city" magazine reporter, is preparing to travel on assignment to the small western town of Twin Wells. Her editor instructs her to gather information and take photographs for an article about "Wildcat" Kelly, a legendary bandit who 35 years earlier was shot and killed for a $50,000 reward and buried in Twin Wells. Toni's boss informs her, however, that the real Wildcat may not have died in 1910. He says an old man named McCoy recently confessed on his deathbed that he and his unnamed partner had collected the large reward for shooting Wildcat, but the man who was killed and buried was not the real outlaw, only someone who looked like him.

Once in Twin Wells, Toni meets dude rancher Roy Rogers and his best friend Gabby Whittaker (George "Gabby" Hayes). She tells them she is a writing a book about western outlaws, not that she is a reporter. Later, when she discovers that Gabby is really the "dead" Wildcat Kelly, Roy implores her not to divulge his secret; it will only cause trouble for Gabby, who has been a model citizen since he faked his death. Despite Roy's pleas, Toni prints her magazine story, along with photographs of Gabby. The news that public funds had been misspent on a phony reward, even so long ago, angers the state's current governor (Paul Harvey), and he orders an investigation of Gabby. The news also prompts an unidentified gunman to shoot the former bandit and then flee. Fortunately, Gabby is only wounded.

Toni now helps Roy to identify Gabby's attacker, Cliff Anson (Marc Lawrence), and to track him to the "Westward Ho Resort" owned by Henry Bennett (Moroni Olsen). Roy, Toni, and their friends take jobs as entertainers there to learn what connection Anson has to Bennett. Anson soon panics when he sees Gabby visiting the resort, and he tells Bennett, who kills Anson and then implicates Gabby for the murder. Running from the police, Gabby, Roy, and Toni soon manage to meet with the local sheriff (Tom London) to explain what truly happened. Gabby recounts how as Wildcat back in 1910, he staged his death so he could begin a constructive, law-abiding life with a new name. A large "sack of sand" was put in his casket to simulate the weight of a corpse; however, Bennett and his accomplice McCoy later substituted a real body for the sand so they could claim the reward for killing Wildcat. As Gabby and Roy continue to talk with the sheriff, Bennett and his gang suddenly arrive; but Roy, Gabby and their allies overpower the bad guys and have them arrested. Months later, the exonerated Gabby discusses his criminal past with the governor. He tells the chief executive that he kept none of the money he stole as an outlaw; instead, he gave most of it to charities, donated some to the governor's own political campaign, and used the rest to buy the available Western Ho Resort to serve as an exclusive vacation site for state employees.

== Cast ==
- Roy Rogers as himself
- Trigger as Rogers' horse
- George "Gabby" Hayes as "Gabby" Whittaker (aka "Wildcat" Kelly)
- Dale Evans as Toni Ames, a reporter
- Robert Livingston as Jack Chandler, Toni's boss
- Moroni Olsen as Henry Bennett (aka Harry Benson)
- Marc Lawrence as Clifford Anson
- Lucile Gleason as Mrs. Prentiss
- Andrew Tombes as Cartwright
- Paul Harvey as Governor Thomas
- Tom London as Sheriff Ben Duncan
- Douglas Fowley as Jack Gordon
- Steve Barclay as Tracy
- Edgar Dearing as the chief of police
- Bob Nolan as Bob

== Release and reception ==
By the time of the release of Don't Fence Me In in 1945, Roy Rogers was already recognized throughout the United States as "The King of the Cowboys". Since his first starring role in Under Western Stars seven years earlier, he had evolved into a major star within the subtype of Westerns known as "singing-cowboy pictures". Republic Pictures, which produced and distributed Don't Fence Me In, would continue to release several of Rogers' films every year until the final months of 1951. Produced on a relatively low budget, with a running time of 71 minutes, Don't Fence Me In—like Rogers' other films in this period—was categorized as a "B"-grade production and presented at theaters as a second feature in double billings or showcased on Saturday mornings and afternoons for Roy's legions of younger fans. Despite that status or secondary grade in perceived "quality" compared to top-billed feature films, Don't Fence Me In attracted greater coverage and more reviews from trade publications and newspapers than other B films due to Roy Roger's extraordinary popularity.

One of the more widely read trade papers in 1945, The Film Daily in New York, described Don't Fence Me In as a well-cast "Knockout Western Musical With All the Qualities For Top Feature Billing":

Republic has a sure-fire box office winner with this one, and should feel mighty proud of having corralled director John English and associate producer Donald H. Brown to handle the job ... The tune title has been perfectly adapted to a swell original screenplay by Dorrell and Stuart E. McGowen, and a new, catchy lyrical tune, "A Kiss Goodnight," has been injected for special delivery by Dale Evans. Despite the fact that Rogers, King of the Cowboys, offers his best performance to date, equal honors must be shared by Gabby Hayes, as Wildcat Kelly, and good-looking Dale Evans for her zippy candid camera reporting.

In another review of Don't Fence Me In in October 1945, the trade weekly Motion Picture Herald complimented the film as entertaining, predicting it would "appeal to a more vast audience than the usual Western." Variety agreed that Rogers' film had broad appeal, which the paper's reviewer credited chiefly to the "lavishness" of the "ultra western" and to John English's expert direction.

== Music ==
Songs are a defining element in all the singing-cowboy films released by Hollywood studios during the 1930s, 1940s, and early 1950s. In its already noted positive review of Don't Fence Me In, the Motion Picture Herald recognized the film's music as "the highlight of the picture." The following songs and instrumental performance of "Lights of Old Santa Fe" are presented at various points in the film by Roy Rogers, Dale Evans, and the Sons of the Pioneers:

- "A Kiss Goodnight"—sung by Dale Evans; written by Freddie Slack, Reba H. Herman, and Floyd Victor.
- "Choo Choo Polka"—sung by Roy Rogers and the Sons of the Pioneers; written by Mike Shores and Zeke Manners.
- "My Little Buckaroo"—sung by Roy Rogers; music by M.K. Jerome; lyrics by Jack Scholl.
- "Don't Fence Me In"—sung by Roy Rogers, Dale Evans, and the Sons of the Pioneers; written by Cole Porter.
- "The Last-Roundup"—sung by the Sons of the Pioneers; written by Billy Hill.
- "Along the Navajo Trail"—sung by Roy Rogers and the Sons of the Pioneers; written by Larry Markes, Dick Charles, and Eddie DeLange.
- "Tumbling Tumbleweeds"—sung by the Sons of the Pioneers; written by Bob Nolan.
- "Lights of Old Santa Fe"—performed by the Sons of the Pioneers as background instrumental; written by Jack Elliot.
