= Songs from Mr. Music =

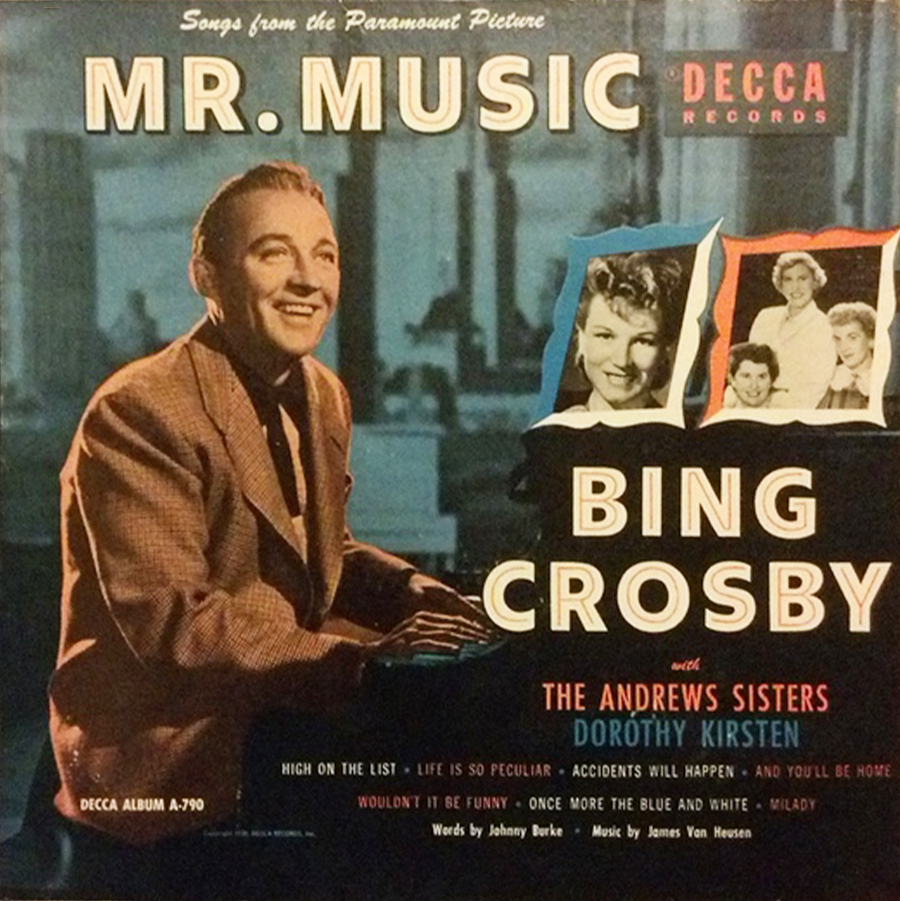

Studio album by Bing Crosby, The Andrews Sisters, Dorothy Kirsten
- Released: 1950
- Recorded: 1950
- Genre: Popular
- Length: 22:09
- Label: Decca

Bing Crosby chronology
Top o' the Morning / Emperor Waltz (1950)	Songs from Mr. Music (1950)	Go West Young Man (w/ The Andrews Sisters) (1950)

Songs from Mr. Music is a Decca Records (catalog number A-790) studio 78 rpm album of phonograph records by Bing Crosby, The Andrews Sisters and Dorothy Kirsten of songs from the film Mr. Music.

== Background ==
In the film, Crosby sang one version of "Life Is So Peculiar" with Peggy Lee but as she was contracted to Capitol Records, that song and "High on the List" was recorded for Decca by Bing and The Andrews Sisters. Additionally, a song called "Milady" is heard in the background in the film, but Decca used Dorothy Kirsten to sing it with Crosby for the commercial release. The song "Wasn’t I There" which Crosby sings briefly in the movie was not recorded commercially. All the songs were written by Jimmy Van Heusen (music) and Johnny Burke (lyrics).

== Reception ==
Variety commented on the album, "Seven numbers from the Paramount pic, "Mr. Music," scored by Johnny Burke and Van Heusen, are included in this strong Decca set. Crosby delivers them all, teaming up with Andrews Sisters on "High on the List." and "Life Is So Peculiar" and with Dorothy Kirsten on "Accidents Will Happen" and "Milady.""

Billboard reviewed some of the songs from Mr. Music when they were issued as singles, saying:

High on the List—Ballad from the coming "Mr. Music" flicker, a Crosby starrer, is done handsomely by Bing and the Andrews. Song’s values stack up for limited appeal.

Life Is So Peculiar—The philosophical rhythm tidbit from the Crosby flicker is handled with ease and beat by Bing and the sisters. It’s a good bid but it’s short of such a predecessor as "Swingin’ on a Star."

Accidents Will Happen—A classy ballad from Bing’s coming "Mr. Music" flicker is warbled richly by Crosby in his best crooning fashion.

And You’ll Be Home—Another high-grade "Mr. Music" ballad with a greater degree of commercial value is treated warmly by Bing and a vocal group. Disking should have added values when the flicker shows around Christmas.

The album itself charted briefly in the No. 10 position in Billboard’s best-selling popular albums list.

== Track listing ==
These songs were featured on a four-disc, 78 rpm album set, Decca Album No. A-790. All music by Jimmy Van Heusen and lyrics by Johnny Burke.

Side	Title	Recording date	Performed with	Time
Disc 1: (27173)
A.	"Life Is So Peculiar"	March 24, 1950	The Andrews Sisters and Vic Schoen and his Orchestra	2:48
B.	"High on the List"	March 24, 1950	The Andrews Sisters and Vic Schoen and his Orchestra	3:01
Disc 2: (27241)
A.	"And You’ll Be Home"	June 21, 1950	Victor Young and His Orchestra, and the Ken Lane Singers	3:08
B.	"Accidents Will Happen"	June 21, 1950	Victor Young and His Orchestra	2:47
Disc 3: (27263)
A.	"Once More the Blue and White"	June 21, 1950	Victor Young and His Orchestra, and the Ken Lane Singers	1:58
B.	"Wouldn’t It Be Funny"	June 21, 1950	Victor Young and His Orchestra	2:49
Disc 4: (27264)
A.	"Accidents Will Happen"	April 11, 1950	Dorothy Kirsten and Jay Blackton and His Orchestra	2:38
B.	"Milady"	April 11, 1950	Dorothy Kirsten and Jay Blackton and His Orchestra	3:00

== Other releases ==
The album was also issued as a 10" vinyl LP in 1950 with the catalogue number DL 5284.

SIDE ONE

1. "High on the List"
2. "Life Is So Peculiar"
3. "Accidents Will Happen" (solo)
4. "And You’ll Be Home"

SIDE TWO

1. "Wouldn’t It Be Funny"
2. "Once More the Blue and White"
3. "Accidents Will Happen" (with Dorothy Kirsten)
4. "Milady" (with Dorothy Kirsten)

A 4-disc 45 rpm album numbered 9-101 was also issued and it too charted briefly at No. 10 in the Billboard list of best-selling 45 rpm albums.
