= Go West Young Man =

"Go West, young man" is a quote often attributed to American author Horace Greeley concerning America's expansion westward.

Go West Young Man may refer to:

== Film and television ==
- Go West, Young Man (1918 film), an American comedy western film directed by Harry Beaumont
- Go West, Young Man (1936 film), an American comedy film starring Mae West
- Go West, Young Man (1980 film), a film directed by Urs Egger and written by Egger and Carel Struycken
- "Go West Young Man" (Only Fools and Horses), an episode of a British television sitcom
- "Go Young, West Man", episode of season 5 of The Fairly OddParents, an American animated television series

== Music ==
- Go West Young Man (Bing Crosby album), 1950
- Go West Young Man (Michael W. Smith album), 1990
- Go West Young Man, Let the Evil Go East, 2008 Greeley Estates album
- "Go West Young Man" (Groucho Marx song), 1940 film song, later a 1950 single by Bing Crosby and the Andrews Sisters
- "Go West Young Man", North America and Japan single release title of "Deep in the Motherlode", a song by Genesis from the album ...And Then There Were Three....

== See also ==
- Go West (disambiguation)
