= Go West Young Man (Groucho Marx song) =

Song by Groucho Marx
- Released: 1940
- Genre: Traditional pop
- Composer: Harry Ruby
- Lyricist: Bert Kalmar

"Go West Young Man" was a 1940 song by Bert Kalmar and Harry Ruby written for the MGM film Go West, originally sung by Groucho Marx, backed by a chorus, who performed solo for the first time in the song. The song was cut from the film. The song was eventually used in the 1947 United Artists film Copacabana when it was sung again by Groucho. He and Bing Crosby dueted on the song on Crosby's Philco Radio Time show on February 12, 1947.

The song was recorded by Bing Crosby and The Andrews Sisters on March 26, 1947 and was the lead track for Bing Crosby's album Go West Young Man. The B-side of the single was "Along the Navajo Trail" by Larry Markes, Dick Charles, and Eddie DeLange.
