= Gone West (disambiguation) =

Gone West was an American country pop group.

Gone West may also refer to:

- Gone West (horse) (1984–2009), American Thoroughbred racehorse
- Gone West (novel), 2012 novel by Carola Dunn

== See also ==
- Gone with the West, 1975 Western film
- Go West (disambiguation)
- Gone (disambiguation)
- West (disambiguation)
