= The Country and Western Sound of Jazz Pianos =

Studio album by Toshiko Akiyoshi, Steve Kuhn
- Released: 5 August 1963
- Recorded: 1963
- Venue: New York City
- Studio: Olmsted Studios
- Genre: Jazz
- Length: 40:22
- Label: Dauntless; DM-4308 / DS-6308

Toshiko Akiyoshi chronology
East and West (1963)	The Country and Western Sound of Jazz Pianos (1963)	Miwaku No Jazz (1963)

Steve Kuhn chronology
The Country and Western Sound of Jazz Pianos (1963)	Three Waves (1966)

Alternative cover / title
- Chiaroscuro release CR 2026

Professional ratings
Review scores
Source	Rating
Allmusic link	3/5 stars
The Penguin Guide to Jazz Recordings	3/4 stars

The Country and Western Sound of Jazz Pianos is an album recorded by jazz pianists Toshiko Akiyoshi and Steve Kuhn in New York City in 1963 and released on the Dauntless label. It was later re-released on the Chiaroscuro label under the title, Together, Steve Kuhn and Toshiko Akiyoshi.

== Track listing ==
LP Side A

1. "Trouble in Mind" (R. Jones) – 4:42
2. "Hang Your Head in Shame" (E. G. Nelson, S. Nelson, F. Rose) – 3:54
3. "May the Good Lord Bless and Keep You" (M. Willson) – 3:20
4. "Someday You'll Want Me to Want You" (J. Hodges) – 4:20
5. "Down in the Valley" (traditional) – 3:40

LP Side B

1. "Beautiful Brown Eyes" (G. Walters) – 4:22
2. "It's No Secret (What God Can Do)" (S. Hamblen) – 4:47
3. "Nobody's Darling but Mine" (J. Davis) – 3:23
4. "Along the Navajo Trail" (D. Charles, E. DeLange, L. Markes) – 3:24
5. "The Foggy Dew" (traditional) – 4:30

== Personnel ==
Arranged & conducted by Ed Summerlin

- Toshiko Akiyoshi – piano, celeste
- Steve Kuhn – piano, harpsichord
- David Izenzon – bass
- John Neves – bass
- Barry Galbraith – guitar
- Pete LaRoca – drums
