= Along the Navajo Trail =

Along the Navajo Trail may refer to:

- Along the Navajo Trail (film) a 1945 American film starring Roy Rogers
- "Along the Navajo Trail" (song), a 1945 song by Dick Charles (pseudonym for Richard Charles Krieg), Larry Markes, and Edgar DeLange
