= Going West (disambiguation) =

Going West (The Going West Books & Writers Festival) is a New Zealand literary festival.

Going West may also refer to:

- "Going West" (The Good Guys), a 1992 television episode
- "Going West", a song by the Members from the 1982 album Uprhythm, Downbeat
- Goin' West, a 1969 album by Grant Green

== See also ==
- Go West (disambiguation)
