= Pennsylvania Polka =

Polka song written in 1942

Song
- Language: English
- Published: 1942
- Songwriters: Lester Lee and Zeke Manners

"Pennsylvania Polka" is a polka song written in the United States in 1942.

The song was written by Lester Lee and Zeke Manners, and published by Shapiro, Bernstein & Co. It became an almost immediate hit for The Andrews Sisters. Frankie Yankovic also made a successful recording of the "Pennsylvania Polka".

The song consists of a chorus and one verse, describing itself as a popular dance craze ("everybody has a mania / to do the polka from Pennsylvania") and joyful event ("while they're dancing, everybody's cares are quickly gone"). The lyrics mention the city of Scranton, Pennsylvania, but no other specific references to Pennsylvania places or culture.

Though Lee and Manners are given credit for writing the song, a former bandleader from Dupont, Pennsylvania, said he had written and played the tune, though without lyrics, in the 1920s. Paul Motiska said his composition, "The Laughing Polka", became a regional favorite after his big band, the Melodions, was featured on a Scranton radio station in 1923. In 1952, The Standard-Speaker newspaper of Hazleton speculated that this was the origin of the lyric "It started in Scranton, it's now No. 1."

Despite its origins in Northeastern Pennsylvania, the song is most associated with Greater Pittsburgh, where it was popular among that region's Polish immigrant community and served as an anthem for the 1970s Super Bowl-winning Pittsburgh Steelers football teams.

In the 1970s and early 1980s, when the Pennsylvania General Assembly repeatedly debated adopting a state song – being one of the few states without one – the "Pennsylvania Polka" was one of the perennial contenders. In 1980, the Evening Herald of Shenandoah, Pennsylvania, editorialized on behalf of "Pennsylvania Polka" for state song, calling it "a happy, catchy tune" and "one that's been familiar to generations of people all over the country since it first swept to the top of the popular music charts way back in the early '40s". Pennsylvania legislators eventually adopted "Pennsylvania" as the official state song in November 1990.

Sesame Street had a spoof of the song called "The Transylvania Polka", sung by the Count.

In 1979, Bobby Vinton added disco stylings to the song to record the single "Disco Polka". Mel Shields of The Sacramento Bee called it "the most incredible (and incredibly bad) mix of styles".

The song is featured repeatedly in the 1993 film Groundhog Day.

The song is also featured in the 2017 Netflix film The Polka King, and is performed by Jack Black.
