= Dorothy Abbott =

American actress (1920–1968)

- Born: December 16, 1920; Kansas City, Missouri, U.S.
- Died: December 15, 1968 (aged 47); Los Angeles, California, U.S.
- Resting place: Rose Hills Memorial Park
- Other name: Dorothy E. Abbott
- Occupation: Actress
- Years active: 1946–1964
- Spouse: Rudy Diaz (m. 1949)

Dorothy Abbott (December 16, 1920 – December 15, 1968) was an American actress.

== Career ==
Born in Kansas City, Missouri, Abbott acted in Little Theater productions to gain experience before she ventured into films.

She appeared in many films between the 1940s and 1960s as an extra. In Las Vegas, she was a showgirl at the Flamingo Hotel and was known as "the girl with the golden arm". She also appeared in guest roles on The Ford Television Theatre, Leave It to Beaver, and Dragnet as Sergeant Joe Friday's girlfriend, Ann Baker. When she could not find work as an actress, she modeled and sold real estate.

== Death ==
Depressed about the end of her marriage to police officer and actor Rudy Diaz, Abbott died by suicide with a firearm in Los Angeles on December 15, 1968, the day before her 48th birthday. Abbott is buried under her married name of Dorothy Diaz in Rose Hills Memorial Park in Whittier, California.

== Filmography ==
Year	Title	Role	Notes
1946	The Razor's Edge	Showgirl	Uncredited
1947	Road to Rio	Show Girl	Uncredited
1948	If You Knew Susie	Model	Uncredited
1948	Beyond Glory	Party Girl	Uncredited
1948	Night Has a Thousand Eyes	Maid	Uncredited
1948	Words and Music	Showgirl	Uncredited
1948	The Paleface	Minor Role	Uncredited
1949	Take Me Out to the Ball Game	Dancer	Uncredited
1949	Little Women	Schoolgirl	Uncredited
1949	Neptune's Daughter	Model	Uncredited
1949	Red, Hot and Blue	The Queen	
1949	Angels in Disguise	Reception nurse	Uncredited
1949	East Side, West Side	Model	Uncredited
1950	Annie Get Your Gun	Carriage Woman	Uncredited
1950	Where Danger Lives	Nurse Clerk	Uncredited
1950	The Petty Girl	December Petty Girl	Uncredited
1950	A Life of Her Own	Model	Uncredited
1950	Copper Canyon	Showgirl	Uncredited
1951	His Kind of Woman	Card player	Uncredited
1951	My Favorite Spy	Pretty girl	Uncredited
1952	The Las Vegas Story	Waitress	Uncredited
1952	Aaron Slick from Punkin Crick	Showgirl	Uncredited
1952	Skirts Ahoy!	WAC	Uncredited
1953	The Caddy	Girl in Dressing Room	Uncredited
1953	A Virgin in Hollywood	Darla Sloan	
1953	Give a Girl a Break	Chorine	Uncredited
1953–1954	Dragnet	Ann Baker	6 episodes
1954	There's No Business Like Show Business	Show Girl	Uncredited
1955	It's a Great Life	1st Dancer	Episode: "The Missing Husband"
1955	Love Me or Leave Me	Dancer	Uncredited
1955	Rebel Without a Cause	Nurse	Uncredited
1956	Pardners	Dance hall girl	Uncredited
1956	Everything but the Truth	Hostess	Uncredited
1956	The Great Man	Stewardess	Uncredited
1956–1960	The Adventures of Ozzie and Harriet	Various roles	4 episodes
1956–1961	The Adventures of Ozzie & Harriet	Various roles	11 episodes
1957	Gunfight at the O.K. Corral	Girl	Uncredited
1957	Jet Pilot	Girl	Uncredited
1957	Jailhouse Rock	Woman in restaurant	Uncredited
1957	The Unholy Wife	Waitress	Uncredited
1958	South Pacific	Nurse in Thanksgiving Show	
1958	Rock-A-Bye Baby	Secretary	Uncredited
1960	The Apartment	Office Worker	Uncredited
1960	Pepe	Girl	Uncredited
1961	Bachelor in Paradise	Minor Role	Uncredited
1961	Lover Come Back	Brackett Receptionist	Uncredited
1962	Sergeants 3	Mrs. Collingwood	Uncredited
1962	That Touch of Mink	Stewardess	Uncredited
1963	Leave It to Beaver	Miss Walker / The Secretary	2 episodes
1963	A Gathering of Eagles	Mrs. Josten	Uncredited
1963	Palm Springs Weekend	Radio Operator	Uncredited
1964	Quick, Before It Melts	Miss Feeley	Uncredited
1964	Dear Heart	Veronica	Uncredited, (final film role)
