= Carola Dunn =

British-born American novelist

- Born: November 14, 1946 (age 79)
- Education: University of Manchester
- Occupation: Writer
- Writing career
- Genres: Regency romance; detective fiction; cosy mysteries
- Website: caroladunn.weebly.com

Carola Dunn (born 14 November 1946) is a British writer of regency romances and detective fiction.

== Life ==
Dunn attended Friends' School, Saffron Walden, and graduated from the University of Manchester. After university, she relocated to the United States and married an American. She has lived in Eugene, Oregon since 1992. She started writing at 33.

== Books ==
Of Dunn’s 59 books (as of 2018), 32 are regency novels and 27 mysteries (of which in turn, 23 are part of the Daisy Dalrymple mystery series, and four belong to the Cornish Mystery series featuring Eleanor Trewynn, a widow and former international charity worker who has retired to Cornwall).

In the Daisy Dalrymple series, the Honourable Daisy Dalrymple, a freelance writer, meets and marries Detective Chief Inspector Alec Fletcher of Scotland Yard over the course of several novels in which they work together to solve murder cases. He tries, unsuccessfully, to keep her out of crime investigations because his superiors at the Yard object to her involvement. The series is set in the 1920s. Like all Dunn's work, the books are "closed-door" romances which are not sexually explicit.

In the Cornish Mysteries, Mrs. Trewynn, an Aikido practitioner, assists her niece, a member of the local constabulary, in solving various local crimes. Dunn has said that she does not hold herself to exact historical accuracy in the Cornish series, "though the series seems to have settled somewhere in the late '60s".

Although she has continued to write the Dalrymple novels, Dunn explained her transition from regencies to cosies to mysteries featuring an older protagonist as being related to her own age: "Regencies generally have young heroines — my oldest was 42. Daisy has been in her 20s for 20 books now. I wanted to write about a protagonist nearer my own age." She has also said that "If Regencies paid enough to live on, I might still be writing them".

== Selected bibliography ==
=== Historical romances ===
- The Miser's Sister (Magna, 1984)
- A Poor Relation (Harlequin, 1990)
- The Frog Earl (Chivers, 1992)
- My Lord Winter (Chivers, 1992)
- Lord Roworth's Reward (Chivers, 1994)
- The Tudor Signet (Kensington, 1994)
- The Babe and the Baron (Chivers, 1997)
- A Lord for Miss Larkin (Mills and Boon, 1997)

=== The Daisy Dalrymple series ===
1. Death at Wentwater Court (1994)
2. The Winter Garden Mystery (1995)
3. Requiem for a Mezzo (1996)
4. Murder on the Flying Scotsman (1997)
5. Damsel in Distress (1997)
6. Dead in the Water (1999)
7. Styx and Stones (1999)
8. Rattle His Bones (2000)
9. To Davy Jones Below (2001)
10. The Case of the Murdered Muckraker (2002)
11. Mistletoe and Murder (2002)
12. Die Laughing (2003)
13. A Mourning Wedding (2004)
14. Fall of a Philanderer (2005)
15. Gunpowder Plot (2006)
16. The Bloody Tower (2007)
17. Black Ship (2008)
18. Sheer Folly (2009)
19. Anthem for Doomed Youth (2011)
20. Gone West (2012)
21. Heirs of the Body (2013)
22. Superfluous Women (2015)
23. The Corpse at the Crystal Palace (2018)

Short stories

- "Unhappy Medium" in Malice Domestic 7 ("available online". Archived from the original on 2 November 2006.)
- "Storm in a Tea Shoppe" in Crime Through Time ("available online". Archived from the original on 2 November 2006.)

=== Cornish Mystery series ===
1. Manna From Hades (2009)
2. A Colorful Death (2010)
3. The Valley of the Shadow (2012)
4. Buried in the Country (2016)
