= Miwaku No Jazz =

Studio album by Toshiko Akiyoshi
- Released: 1963
- Recorded: 1963
- Venue: Tokyo, Japan
- Genre: Jazz
- Label: Victor Japan

Toshiko Akiyoshi chronology
The Country and Western Sound of Jazz Pianos (1963)	Miwaku No Jazz (1963)	Toshiko Mariano and her Big Band (1964)

Miwaku No Jazz (Japanese title, 魅惑のジャズ = Fascinating Jazz) is an album featuring Toshiko Mariano's (Toshiko Akiyoshi's) piano in a small jazz combo setting. It was originally released in Japan in 1963 by Victor Records and was reissued on CD in 2006 by Think! Records.

== Track listing ==
LP side A

1. "After You've Gone"
2. "Going Home"
3. "Love is a Many Splendored Thing"
4. "Lover, Come Back to Me"
5. "Smoke Gets in Your Eyes"
6. "SAIKAI" (再会)

LP side B

1. "It's All Right with Me"
2. "My Melancholy Baby"
3. "La Mer"
4. "I Can't Stop Loving You"
5. "Les Feuilles Mortes"
6. "Bewitched"

== Personnel ==
- Toshiko Mariano – piano
- Charlie Mariano – alto saxophone (except tracks A1, 3, 6, B3)
- Akira Miyazawa (宮沢昭) – tenor saxophone, flute (tracks A1, B5)
- Akira Fukuhara (福原彰) – trumpet (tracks A4, B1)
- Masanaga Harada (原田政長) – bass (tracks A1, 3, 5, B5, 6)
- Yasuo Arakawa (荒川康男) – bass (except tracks A1, 3, 5, B5, 6)
- Takeshi Inomata (猪俣猛) – drums
