= Zeke Manners =

American musician (1911–2000)

- Birth name: Leo Manners
- Born: October 10, 1911
- Origin: San Francisco, California, US
- Died: October 14, 2000 (aged 89)
- Genres: Country
- Occupation: Country artist
- Instrument(s): Fiddle, banjo, piano
- Years active: 1930s – 1980s

Leo "Zeke" Manners (October 10, 1911 - October 14, 2000) was an American country musician.

== Life and career ==
Manners was born in San Francisco but raised in Los Angeles, where he attended Fairfax High School and learned to play fiddle, banjo, and piano. He played in a traveling revue for a time before joining several Western swing groups. In the 1930s he came to lead a group called The Beverly Hill Billies, who were a popular radio attraction long before the TV show of the same name became a hit. Manners's show, featuring himself on accordion and organ, mixed comedy with Western Swing and was broadcast on Los Angeles's KMPC as well as in New York City.

He covered Mr. Ghost Goes to Town which was written in 1936 by Will Hudson, Irving Mills and Mitchell Parish. The Five Jones Boys also performed the song.

The ensemble played for several years together before breaking up, after which Manners put together the group Zeke & the City Fellers. This band played on New York radio and did a tour of Europe shortly before the outbreak of World War II. In the 1940s he hosted his own One Man Variety Show, a comedy/musical routine, and in the 1950s he hosted music programs on Los Angeles's KFWB and New York's WINS.

Later in his career, Manners performed some stand-up comedy and ran his own mail order business. He had cameo roles in the films Real Life and Lost in America, both of which starred his nephew Albert Brooks; he also appeared in the 1987 film Barfly.

Manners was the author of over 100 songs, including "The Pennsylvania Polka" (best known as a hit by The Andrews Sisters and the Frankie Yankovic version, which made frequent appearances in Groundhog Day), "Take My Wife, Please" (a hit for Henny Youngman), and "Los Angeles" (best known in its version by Les Paul). He worked frequently with Buddy Ebsen, who went on to become Jed Clampett on the Beverly Hillbillies show.

== Discography ==
=== Singles ===
Year	Song	US Country
1946	"Sioux City Sue"	2
1946	"Inflation"	5
