= Toshiko Mariano and Her Big Band =

Studio album by Toshiko Akiyoshi
- Released: 1964
- Recorded: 16 July 1964
- Venue: Tokyo
- Genre: Jazz
- Length: 34:10
- Label: Vee Jay / Nippon Columbia

Toshiko Akiyoshi chronology
Miwaku No Jazz (1963)	Toshiko Mariano and Her Big Band (1964)	Lullabies for You (1965)

Alternative cover / title
- Nippon Columbia release

Professional ratings
Review scores
Source	Rating
Allmusic link	4.5/5 stars

Toshiko Mariano and Her Big Band is a jazz album recorded in Tokyo by Toshiko Akiyoshi (then Toshiko Mariano) in July 1964 and released in the US on the Vee-Jay Records label. It was also released on the Nippon Columbia label in Japan under the title, Toshiko and Modern Jazz. In addition to the 4 big band arrangements featuring a full 16 piece jazz orchestra, there are also three smaller combo tracks on this album.

== Track listing ==
LP side A

1. "Kisarazu Jinku" (traditional. Arrangement: Akiyoshi) – 5:10
2. "Lament" (Johnson) – 4:42
3. "The Shout" (Mariano) – 5:45

LP side B

1. "Israel" (Carisi. Arrangement: Mariano) – 4:03
2. "Land of Peace" (Feather) – 4:18
3. "Walkin'" (Carpenter) – 4:53
4. "Santa Barbara" (Mariano) – 5:19

(Track order of the Vee Jay release shown. Track order on the Nippon Columbia release = A3, A2, A1, B4, B2, B3, B1)

== Personnel ==
- Toshiko Akiyoshi – piano
- Paul Chambers – bass
- Jimmy Cobb – drums
- Akira Miyazawa (宮沢昭) – tenor saxophone (all tracks except "Lament")
- Hidehiko "Sleepy" Matsumoto (松本英彦) – tenor saxophone (all tracks except "Lament")
- Hiroshi Okazaki (岡崎広志) – alto saxophone (tracks A1, A3, B1, B4)
- Shigeo Suzuki (鈴木重男) – alto saxophone (tracks A1, A3, B1, B4)
- Tadayuki Harada (原田忠幸) – baritone saxophone (tracks A1, A3, B1, B4)
- Hisao Mori (森寿男) – trumpet (tracks A1, A3, B1, B4)
- Shigeru Takemura (竹村茂) – trumpet (tracks A1, A3, B1, B4)
- Tetsuo Fushimini (伏見哲夫) – trumpet (tracks A1, A3, B1, B4)
- Terumasa Hino (日野皓正) – trumpet (tracks A1, A3, B1, B4)
- Hiroshi Suzuki (鈴木弘) – trombone (tracks A1, A3, B1, B2, B4)
- Mitsuhiko Matsumoto (松本文彦) – trombone (tracks A1, A3, B1, B4)
- Teruhiko Kataoka (片岡輝彦) – trombone (tracks A1, A3, B1, B4)
- Takeshi Aoki (青木武) – trombone (tracks A1, A3, B1, B4)
