= Lullabies for You =

Studio album by Toshiko Akiyoshi
- Released: 10 May 1965
- Recorded: 4, 5 February 1965
- Venue: Tokyo, Japan
- Genre: Jazz
- Length: 39:40
- Label: Nippon Columbia

Toshiko Akiyoshi chronology
Toshiko Mariano and her Big Band (1964)	Lullabies for You (1965)	Toshiko at Top of the Gate (1968)

Alternative cover
- alternative cover

Lullabies for You, also known as Toshiko's Lullabies (トシコの子守唄), is a jazz album of lullabies and children's songs featuring Toshiko Akiyoshi's piano in a trio setting. It was originally released in Japan in 1965 by Nippon Columbia Records.

== Track listing ==
LP Side 'A'

1. "MARI TO TONOSAMA" (毬と殿様) (Nakayama) – 4:30
2. "Children in the Temple Ground" (カンチョロリン節) – 3:48
3. "Three Blind Mice" – 3:20
4. "Cancion De Extremadura" – 2:16
5. "I KEN PIEN TAN" – 3:19
6. "The March" (Saifiddinov) – 3:35

LP Side 'B'

1. "Angel's Lullaby" – 3:37
2. "Frère Jacques" – 2:33
3. "CHŌCHŌ" (ちょうちょう) – 2:32
4. "London Bridge" – 3:08
5. "TUPPEN OCH HONAN" – 3:38
6. "Lullaby For You" (Akiyoshi) – 3:24

All arrangements by Akiyoshi. All compositions are traditional except as indicated.

== Personnel ==
- Toshiko Mariano a.k.a. Toshiko Akiyoshi (秋吉敏子) – piano
- Yasuo Arakawa (荒川康男) – bass
- Kanji Harada (原田寛治) – drums
