= Lester Lee =

American composer (1903–1956)

- Born: November 7, 1903; New York, U.S.
- Died: June 19, 1956 (aged 52); Los Angeles, California, U.S.
- Occupation: Composer
- Spouse: Elpha Lee
- Children: 2

Lester Lee (November 7, 1903 – June 19, 1956) was an American composer. He was nominated for an Academy Award in the category Best Original Song for the film Miss Sadie Thompson. He was also the co-writer of "Pennsylvania Polka".

Lee died in June 1956 of a heart attack in Los Angeles, California, at the age of 52.

== Selected filmography ==
- Miss Sadie Thompson (1953; co-nominated with Ned Washington)
