= Toshiko at Top of the Gate =

Live album by Toshiko Akiyoshi
- Released: 1968
- Recorded: 30 July 1968
- Venue: Top of the Gate club, New York City
- Genre: Jazz
- Length: 39:46
- Label: Nippon Columbia

Toshiko Akiyoshi chronology
Lullabies for You (1965)	Toshiko at Top of the Gate (1968)	Toshiko Akiyoshi in Japan (1970)

Professional ratings
Review scores
Source	Rating
Allmusic link	2.5/5 stars

Toshiko at Top of the Gate is a live jazz (quintet) album by pianist Toshiko Akiyoshi. It was recorded at the Top of the Gate in New York City in July 1968 and was released by Nippon Columbia and Denon Records.

== Track listing ==
LP side A

1. (Introductions) – 0:35
2. "Opus No. Zero" (Akiyoshi) – 8:13
3. "First Night" (Akiyoshi) – 3:21
4. "Phrygian Waterfall" (Akiyoshi) – 3:53
5. "Let's Roll in Sake" (Akiyoshi) – 3:17

LP side B

1. "How Insensitive" (Jobim) – 3:38
2. "Morning of the Carnival" (Bonfá) – 3:17
3. "The Night Song" (Strouse, Adams) – 3:33
4. "Willow Weep for Me" (Ronell) – 2:29
5. "My Elegy" (Akiyoshi) – 7:30

== Personnel ==
- Toshiko Akiyoshi – piano
- Kenny Dorham – trumpet
- Lew Tabackin – tenor saxophone, flute
- Ron Carter – bass
- Mickey Roker – drums

== References / External links ==
- Dryden, Ken. Allmusic (link)
- Nippon Columbia XMS-10008CT
- Denon 32C38-7874
