= KESW =

KESW may refer to:

- King Edward's School, Witley, a school in Wormley, Surrey, England
- KESW-LP, a low-power radio station (106.5 FM) licensed to Whitehall, Montana, United States
