= Vic Schoen =

American musician and composer (1916–2000)

- Born: Victor Clarence Schoen; March 26, 1916
- Origin: Brooklyn, New York, US
- Died: January 5, 2000 (aged 83)
- Genres: Big band; swing; jazz; traditional pop
- Occupations: Arranger, composer, bandleader
- Instrument: Trumpet
- Years active: 1930s–2000
- Labels: Decca; Kapp; Liberty; Mainstream; Mercury; MCA

Victor Clarence Schoen (March 26, 1916 – January 5, 2000) was an American bandleader, arranger, and composer whose career spanned from the 1930s until his death in 2000. He furnished music for some of the most successful persons in show business including Benny Goodman, Glenn Miller, Count Basie, Tommy Dorsey, Harry James, Les Brown, Woody Herman, Gene Krupa, George Shearing, Jimmie Lunceford, Ray McKinley, Benny Carter, Louis Prima, Russ Morgan, Guy Lombardo, Carmen Cavallaro, Carmen Miranda, Gordon Jenkins, Joe Venuti, Victor Young, Arthur Fiedler and the Boston Pops, and his own The Vic Schoen Orchestra.

Schoen arranged and recorded with well-known artists such as The Andrews Sisters, Bing Crosby, Bob Hope, Danny Kaye, Rosemary Clooney, Irving Berlin, Marion Hutton, Betty Hutton, Perry Como, Dick Haymes, Ella Fitzgerald, Al Jolson, Maurice Chevalier, Enzo Stuarti, Lauritz Melchior, Mary Martin, Bob Crosby, The Weavers, Burl Ives, Eddie Fisher, Mildred Bailey, Peggy Lee, Patti Page, the McGuire Sisters, the Sherman Brothers, and Kay Starr.

Schoen wrote TV specials for Jack Carson Show, The Dave King Show, Ethel Merman, The Big Record with Patti Page, The Dinah Shore Show, Shirley MacLaine, Shirley Temple, Andy Williams, and Pat Boone. He is probably best remembered as the musical director and arranger for the Andrews Sisters.

== Early life and education ==
Vic Schoen was born in Brooklyn, New York, to Jewish parents. He is one of the very few composer-arrangers who was self-taught. Early in his life, he learned to play trumpet and would bring music into his high school classes, which annoyed his teachers. Upon noticing that Schoen was not paying attention in class and writing music, his chemistry teacher stopped by his desk and said, "Someone needs this chair more than you do." He eventually dropped out of high school and started playing in nightclubs in New York City and in the bands of Leon Belasco, Gene Kardos, and Billy Swanson. He also learned how to write big band arrangements at this time by "trial and error". During this time Schoen met George Gershwin at a party in New York City in the mid-1930s.

== Career ==
Schoen also wrote many of Count Basie's earlier arrangements in the mid-1930s. He commented on the time when Basie paid him for some of his arrangements: "He owed me some money one night after a gig. I had written several arrangements for him and he paid me one hundred dollars in single dollar bills. I walked out of that Harlem club with the biggest wad of cash in my pocket. I had never been so scared in my life."

Schoen was also extremely impressed with the sound of the Basie band, "There was quite a large difference in the way that the white bands played versus the black bands. When I would show up to Basie's rehearsals to hear my arrangements sometimes I didn't even realize they were playing one of my charts. The unique way they played and phrased was so different than what I was used to hearing."

=== The Andrews Sisters ===
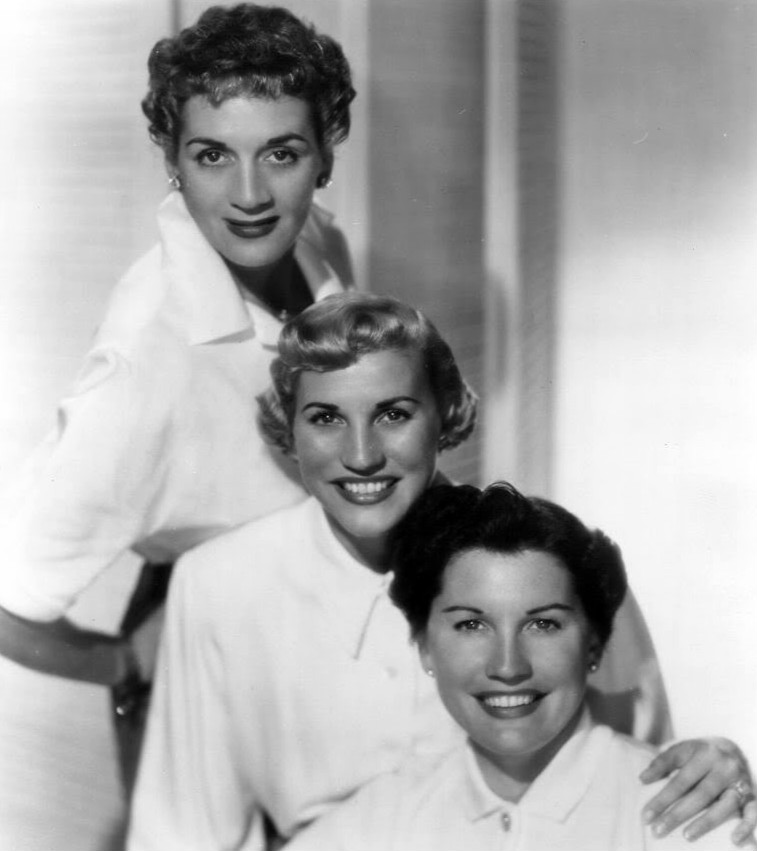
The Andrews Sisters

Schoen met The Andrews Sisters while playing trumpet in Leon Belasco's society orchestra in 1936. The sisters made only one 78 side with Belasco, early in 1937, which was not well received. The girls were packing their bags to go back home to Minneapolis when Schoen, who was then with Billy Swanson's orchestra, invited them to sing on a radio program in New York City. Decca Records A&R vice president Dave Kapp heard the broadcast and invited the sisters to his office. After a short audition he signed them to a contract. They made their first recording for Decca in October 1937 with Schoen arranging for their musical backup. Schoen described the earlier arrangements he wrote for the Andrews Sisters as having a quasi Dixieland feel.

Schoen was backstage at a Yiddish Theatre in New York looking through a large crate of sheet music. He found the song Bei Mir Bist Du Schoen written by Sholom Secunda with Yiddish lyrics by Jacob Jacobs. Schoen was attracted to the song because he liked that his "name was part of the title". After adding his own English lyrics, Schoen arranged the song for the Andrews Sisters and soon they had their first number one hit earning them a Gold Record, the first ever to a female vocal group. Bei Mir Bist Du Schoen, a novelty tune, was originally recorded as a B-side. After the success of the record's release, the Andrews Sisters were asked to sign autographs outside a record store in New York. When Schoen arrived to join in, he noticed lyricist Sammy Cahn next to them also signing his name on the newly released record. Schoen was puzzled and asked a Decca Records producer why Cahn was present. The response was, "We figured that if we put his name down as the lyricist then we'd sell a few more copies."

After the enormous success of the Andrews Sisters, many songwriters sought out Schoen. Don Raye and Hughie Prince were able to convince Schoen to arrange Beat Me Daddy, Eight to the Bar and after the success of that, they followed with a new song Boogie Woogie Bugle Boy. Schoen remembered that the first draft of "Boogie Woogie Bugle Boy" was "a total mess. The harmonies were bad, the song had wrong notes in it. So I re-wrote part of it to make it work." Since Schoen played the trumpet in his orchestra he arranged the song so he could play the iconic opening trumpet solo that heralds off the arrangement. After Schoen became more involved as the conductor, he appeared as a trumpeter less frequently. Bobby Hackett was later hired as the lead trumpet player.

When Schoen was auditioning new band members in the late 1930s for his backup band to the Andrews Sisters, he needed a new drummer. Someone had highly recommended a young man who was new in New York City by the name of "Buddy". Schoen gave the kid a chance at a rehearsal to see if he could play his arrangements. The rehearsal quickly became a disaster after it was obvious that the new drummer could not read music. Schoen was nice enough to meet with the young man afterwards to teach him how to read music. This meeting became very tense and the drummer "ran out of the room." Schoen later commented that "Buddy Rich was terrified about learning to read music." Throughout his lifelong career as a drummer, Buddy Rich never learned to read music.

Schoen once commented that none of the famous big band singers with whom he worked could read music. "They were more known as entertainers than singers. Not one of them could read a note of music." When he worked with the Andrews Sisters, he would sit and play "arranger's piano" next to them. Schoen played the chords on the piano, and the trio matched the chords in three-part harmony. One of the Andrews Sisters' favorite singers to collaborate with was Bing Crosby, with whom they released 47 singles. Patty suggested to Bing that they all should learn how to read music. Bing replied, "What are you crazy? You wanna ruin our careers?"

In the later years, Schoen wanted to add one more trombone and a harp to the band. The record producers at the time objected, as they did not want the sound to change. He had commented that, "Many producers were afraid of change. If something was successful, why change it? Why modify it?" He eventually convinced the producers, and was able to add a few more instruments to his orchestra, which in his opinion improved the sound. Apple Blossom Time starts out with a harp solo. By the early 1940s, the arrangements matured, along with the voices and phrasing of the Andrews Sisters.

Although the Andrews Sisters would occasionally record with established bands and, particularly in their later years at Decca, with Gordon Jenkins, Schoen became the arranger and conductor with whom they most often worked. He formed his own orchestra in 1938 and backed them on stage and on screen, as well as in the studio, for the next decade. Schoen, whose self-taught approach to arranging possibly made him compatible with the Andrews Sisters—only LaVerne could read music—became their closest creative partner, and was an essential part of the trio's sound during their biggest years. Even on songs that he reportedly didn't appreciate, such as Beer Barrel Polka, his arrangements were successful, while on numbers like Boogie Woogie Bugle Boy, which captured his interest, Schoen was downright inspired, even ascending to brilliance. His record of success with the Andrews Sisters quickly established Schoen as a much sought-after arranger and conductor, and the 1940s were extremely busy years for him. His band flourished until the early 1950s. William Studwell, author of the Big Band Reader, said, "For years, the Vic Schoen Orchestra played music that at least approached the beauty and variety of a rainbow, but historically, the ensemble is about as elusive as that phenomenon in the sky."

Schoen scored an animated film for Walt Disney: Little Toot (1948) which used the Andrews Sisters to narrate-sing the storylines.

The concept behind The Andrews Sisters arrangements was a simple formula that Schoen used many times. Whenever the trio was singing in harmony Schoen did not have the big band interfere by playing harmony in the background (e.g. saxes, or trombones). Instead he would arrange for the band to play unison lines. If the Andrews Sisters were singing in unison, then the background musicians would play harmony. Using harmony in the trio as well as the big band caused a lack of clarity in the music. Although there were exceptions to the rule, this basic concept gave his arrangements a coherence, lucidity, and "punch" that was subsequently copied by many big band vocal groups in later years.

In most melodies, there are moments of space. Schoen cleverly used these areas in the song to add a quick fill in the big band between the phrases that the Andrews Sisters sang—never simultaneously with the melody (he felt it would interfere). Schoen also never wrote below the lowest G in the double bass (even though the instrument could play a full fifth of an interval below). To his ears, the double bass in that register "sounded too muddy, tubby, ... unclear." Schoen would also write out all of his bass parts and never put chords over them. He used repeated notes in the bass (which was popular in the 1930s) instead of the constant walking bass, which came later in 1940s big band music.

After the Andrews Sisters settled in California they owned a house in Brentwood. Their parents had moved out to California to live with them. The father built a side room onto the house which stored all of their awards, memorabilia, and Schoen's arrangements. In the 1960s, a fire burned down the house. All of the Andrews Sisters arrangements have been lost (except for transcriptions that were made from recordings). (Incidentally a similar thing happened to the Les Brown Band in the 1960s. When the band was not touring, all of the music was kept at the band manager's house. The band manager was going through a bitter divorce at the time and his wife called the garbage company to come and take all of the "garbage out of the basement". Schoen contributed many arrangements to Les Brown's library and those are lost to this day.)

The partnership between Schoen and the Andrews Sisters lasted for twenty years. He scored and conducted most of their recordings, including such hits as the aforementioned Boogie Woogie Bugle Boy and Bei Mir Bist Du Schoen, as well as Rum and Coca Cola, Apple Blossom Time, I Can Dream Can't I, and I Wanna Be Loved. He also served as their musical director on several films, most notably Buck Pirates, and on television specials and concerts, including the group's concert at the London Palladium. Schoen and the Andrews Sisters met Queen Elizabeth after this concert.

=== 1940s ===
From 1940 to 1957 Schoen lived in Los Angeles and throughout those years was music director in residence for Decca Records, Kapp Records, RCA Records, Liberty Records, and Mainstream Records. He was musical director for Universal Pictures for three years, Paramount Pictures for four years, and was with ABC, NBC, and CBS for eleven years.

Schoen arranged songs for many of the Andrews Sisters movies and Abbott and Costello comedies including Argentine Nights (1940), Buck Privates (1941), In the Navy (1941), Hold That Ghost (1941), What's Cookin'? (1942), Private Buckaroo (1942), Give Out, Sisters (1942), How's About It (1943), Always a Bridesmaid (1943), Swingtime Johnny (1943), Moonlight and Cactus (1944), Follow the Boys (1944), Hollywood Canteen (1944), Her Lucky Night (1945), and Make Mine Music (1946).

He wrote several arrangements for Bob Hope and Bing Crosby's TV specials and movies, including, among others, Road to Zanzibar (1941), Road to Morocco (1942)—Schoen arranged the title song as well as Moonlight Becomes You for Bing Crosby—and Road to Rio (1947). He also provided musical backing for the Donald O'Connor – Peggy Ryan musicals.

Walter Schumann called Schoen in 1942 and asked him "Would you like to stay out of the army?" Irving Berlin was writing songs for the movie This Is the Army, and Schumann was asked to gather additional arrangers for the movie-musical. Schoen arranged the film's most famous song, "This Is the Army Mr. Jones." In 1945 Schoen arranged Ella Fitzgerald's famous scat recording of Flying Home and would later be described by The New York Times as "one of the most influential vocal jazz records of the decade."

Throughout the late 1930s and into the 1940s Schoen wrote an enormous number of stock arrangements for young high school (non-professional) bands to perform. These "stocks" were published by Edward B. Marks, Leeds Music Corp., Harms Music, Clarence Williams Music, and American Academy of Music. During this time, Johnny Warrington, Jack Mason, and Schoen dominated this field. This was easy for Schoen because of the speed with which he wrote. "These type of arrangements had to be kept simple and easy for the high school bands to play, they were kind of vanilla and safe," he remarked.

=== 1950s ===
In 1951, Schoen arranged "On Top of Old Smoky" for The Weavers. For three years (1951–54) he arranged and conducted the Dinah Shore TV series and recordings, and was also the bandleader for the enormously successful Colgate Comedy Hour in 1954. During a live broadcast of the Dinah Shore TV Show, he arrived 20 minutes late. Two of the show's producers greeted him backstage as he arrived. The first producer greeted him at the door, nodded, and said "Mr. Schoen." The second producer also nodded and said, "Mr. Schoen." After a brief pause the first producer said, "That's going to be $22,000 off of your salary." After that, Schoen remarked that he was never late for anything ever again. One of Schoen's background singers in the Dinah Shore Show was a young woman by the name of Virginia "Ginny" O'Connor. Schoen recalled, "A young Henry Mancini was pursuing her at the time. He used to hang out backstage waiting for her." Mancini and O'Connor eventually married. In 1991 Dinah Shore was asked about working with Schoen on her television show, she commented, "I was very lucky to have him as my musical director during those years. He was one of the most sought after arrangers of the time."

Schoen worked with Irving Berlin on the 1954 movie White Christmas where he arranged the songs "Count Your Blessings" and "White Christmas". White Christmas was the highest-grossing film of 1954 by a wide margin. Schoen wrote for Maurice Chevalier's first American tour in 1955 and also arranged for Chevalier's television specials. Schoen composed and arranged for Danny Kaye's 1956 movie The Court Jester – a hugely successful musical-comedy. Film composer Elmer Bernstein was hired as the assistant musical director to Schoen for the film. The Court Jester was an enormous challenge for Schoen at the time because it was his first feature film. He was not officially trained on the mechanisms of how music was synchronized to film. Most of the earlier films he worked on needed vocal arrangements (different from background score) which were recorded before the shooting of the film. Schoen learned on the job how to synchronize 100 minutes of background score and vocal arrangements. Sammy Cahn and Sylvia Fine, who was Danny Kaye's wife, were asked to provide seven songs for the picture. Some pieces in the film (also known as 'cues') were very long and required a great deal of hours for Schoen to finesse. One piece that Schoen was most proud of in his career was the chase music he wrote toward the end of the movie when Danny Kaye's character engages in a sword fight. Schoen wrote a mini piano concerto for this scene.

A pleasant surprise happened during the recording session of The Court Jester. The red "recording in progress" light was illuminated to ensure no interruptions, so Schoen started to conduct a cue but noticed that the entire orchestra had turned to look at Igor Stravinsky, who had just walked into the studio. Schoen said, "The entire room was astonished to see this short little man with a big chest walk in and listen to our session. I later talked with him after we were done recording. We went and got a cup of coffee together. After listening to my music Stravinsky had told me 'You have broken all the rules'. At the time I didn't understand his comment because I had been self-taught. It took me years to figure out what he had meant." In the late 1950s Schoen arranged and conducted music for Danny Kaye at the New York Palace Theatre on Broadway. He arranged "I've Got a Lovely Bunch of Coconuts", "Anatole of Paris", "The Peony Bush", "Madam, I Love Your Crepe Suzette", "I Belong To Glasgow", "Good Old 149", and "Tschaikowsky".

At the height of his fame in the late 1940s and early 1950s, various producers approached Schoen about making him a "TV personality". This was unappealing to him, as it meant he would have less time to devote to writing his music. The producers suggested that he hire another arranger-orchestrator to help write his music, but Schoen, who orchestrated all of his own compositions and arrangements, always declined. He orchestrated all of his own music for The Court Jester, which was unusual at the time because most film composers used an orchestrator to help speed up the process due to the enormous time constraints and amount of music to write. In the 1950s Schoen arranged music for an album that was released on Decca called "Music for a Rainy Night". Johnny Green was so upset about Schoen's arrangement of his 1933 song "I Cover the Waterfront" (which appeared on the album) that he never spoke with Schoen again. Green felt that the arrangement was a disgrace to his song.

In 1956 Schoen became the musical director for Patti Page producing a long string of hits that included "Mama from the Train", "Allegheny Moon", "Old Cape Cod", "Belonging To Someone", and "Left Right Out of Your Heart". Page and Schoen's most challenging project was a new recording of Gordon Jenkins narrative tone poem Manhattan Tower (recorded September 1956). The album was a tremendous success, both artistically and commercially, reaching No. 18 on the Billboard LP chart, the highest ranking of any album she ever made. Schoen's arrangements were far more lively and jazzy than the original Jenkins arrangements. Schoen recalled, "Patti was an alto, but I pushed her to reach notes higher than she had sung before for this album. We always enjoyed working together."

In 1957, Schoen moved to New York City to become the musical director for The Big Record (1957–58), a variety series on CBS hosted by Patti Page. Schoen recalled, "Virtually all of the most famous singers and big bands of the time performed on this show." Schoen also composed and arranged music for numerous Las Vegas productions at the Desert Inn, the Stardust, The Lido in Las Vegas as well as The Lido in Paris (including three world tours).

==== Stereophonic Suite for Two Bands (1959) ====
The following is from the original liner notes:

Stereophonic Suite for Two Bands was first conceived in early 1958 when Vic was musical director for The Big Record TV series hosted by Patti Page. Several bands appeared as guests on The Big Record, but it wasn't until Les Brown, an old friend, was booked that Vic decided to fulfill a long-term desire to write a work for two bands. It turned out to be the finale of the show, and the mail reaction more than justified the battle Vic had experienced to get as much as six minutes for the production. This initial essay was "Ballet In Brass," included in this album. Later in the year, Vic wrote the rest of the work but it was many months before Les Brown's peripatetic band was in New York long enough for the recording to take place. Les, absorbed by the challenge from the beginning, worked hard with Vic in making this set come alive. In fact, Les made his participation in this date a prior condition of his new contract with another label.

The men of both bands were also continuously intrigued at being part of this new experience, instead of wandering outside for a break, they stayed in the studio, listening intently to the playback. Some actually sacrificed more lucrative assignments to be there.

Beginning with "Ballet In Brass", Vic's love for antiphonal interplay becomes evident as does his pleasure in building climaxes by using very clear-cut unpretentious patterns. The trumpets are Dick Collins of the Brown band and Jimmy Nottingham of Vic's.

On "Four Score and Seven," there are the bass of Arnold Fishkin, flutist Alan Ross, and one of the most tantalizing fades on record.

"109 Station Road" (part of Mr. Schoen's address in Great Neck, NY) is notable for section cohesion again.

In "The Sorcerer and the Latin," Vic uses even more variegated colors. The tenor saxophone is Boomie Richman with incisive piccolo by Alan Ross. There's a trombone duel between Chauncey Welsch and Dick Kenney of the Brown band, and an ending during which your wall may seem ablaze with brass.

In "Oh, Those Martian Blues," the pianist is Les Brown's Donn Trenner. The preaching tenor saxophone solo is by Boomie Richman. Dick Collins again jousts for Brown while the trumpets on the right hand side are represented by Joe Wilder and then by Jimmy Nottingham up high.

On "Pipe Dreams," note the relaxed, flowing section work. The precision skill of these men – working for the first time in this challenging full-length context – is impressive throughout.

"The Fire and the Flame" includes an alto saxophone solo by Sam Marowitz and those legions of brass instruments align again.

"The Strange and Stirring Romance of the Inebriated Owl and the Insubordinate Teacup" underlines the timpani wit of Bobby Rosengarden and Vic's humour, which has been evident many other times in the work.

"Symphonie Pour L'Orchestre Americain" features the legitimate clarinet of Alan Ross and indicates more of Vic's diversity approach.

This album, I expect will do a lot toward convincing listeners of just how much more you can hear in stereo. There's certainly bursting excitement in the monophonic version, but in stereo, Vic's conception takes on intensely vivid life and becomes a new recording experience.

As Les Brown said at the end of the date, "This one rates a special award!"

Nat Hentoff, co-Editor, The Jazz Review

Les Brown and His Band of Renown

- Reeds: Butch Stone, Billy Usselton, Matt Utal, Ralph La Polla, Abe Aaron
- Trumpets: Mickey McMahon, Wes Hensel, Dick Collins, Jerry Kadovitz
- Trombones: Stumpy Brown, J. Hill, Roy Main, Dick Kenney

Vic Schoen and His All Star Band

- Reeds: Boomie Richman, Alan Ross, Sam Marowitz, Charlie O'Kane, Leon Cohen
- Trumpets: Bernie Privin, Joe Wilder, Jimmy Maxwell, Jimmy Nottingham
- Trombones: Charlie Small, Chauncey Welsch, Tommy Mitchell

Rhythm Section for Both Bands

- Piano: Donn Trenner – Bass: Arnie Fishkin – Drums: Sol Gubin – Guitar: Art Reyson – Percussion: Bobby Rosengarden

Recording Studio: Ballroom Studio of Fine Recording, New York
Recording Dates: February 23–24, 1959
Producer: Michael Kapp
Engineer: C.R. Fine

Schoen had a relationship with David Kapp (from Decca Records) who released the album on his newly formed label Kapp Records. 1959 saw the release of Stereophonic Suite for Two Bands: The Les Brown Band and Vic Schoen and His Orchestra. Schoen composed and arranged nine compositions for the album, which was groundbreaking at the time. The album featured two full big bands, with a total of eight trumpets, seven trombones, ten saxes, guitar, piano, bass, drums, and a percussionist.

Schoen's concept for the album was to demonstrate the exciting "ping pong effect" of early stereo recording, which was becoming popular in the 1950s. At that time, there was no album that featured two bands playing together. However, Schoen arranged the music in such a way that two bands would alternate playing rather than perform the same music simultaneously, as he felt that the sound would be too loud, distorted, and overbearing. Instead, he composed the music so that Les Brown's band would play a musical idea on the left, and his own band would respond on the right, either answering the idea or introducing a whole new idea (and vice versa). So innovative and exciting was this project that some of the musicians turned down an offer to play on another, better-paying recording just a few miles away.

After the release of Stereophonic Suite for Two Bands, the album quickly became sold out in a particular store in Los Angeles that Dragnet actor Jack Webb could not find a copy. Webb called Schoen on the phone asking how he could receive a copy. Schoen mailed him one.

Count Basie called Schoen and asked him to re-arrange "109 Station Road" as a one-band version for the Basie Band. This piece was named after Schoen's former address in Great Neck, New York.

For many years after the release of Stereophonic Suite for Two Bands, Les Brown tried on many occasions to persuade Schoen to compose more music for a second album. Schoen finally agreed in the mid-1990s, and new music was premiered on November 26, 1995, at the Orange County Musicians' Union's 25th annual "Bash" scholarship benefit at the Red Lion Hotel in Costa Mesa, CA with the Les Brown Band and the Bill Tole Orchestra. The concert featured "Ballet in Brass II", "Smoky Lune", "Cries and Whispers", "Classical Jazz", and some of the original music from the 1959 album.

Of the nine pieces on the 1959 album, the original scores and parts currently exist for only five, the reason being that Schoen would let many people borrow his music over the years, which he sometimes never received back. The album was re-issued on LP four times, sometimes even without Schoen's knowledge. "I was surprised to see it in the record store with a new cover every time they would re-issue it," he remarked. Stereophonic Suite for Two Bands was by far one of Schoen's most successful and famous yet fulfilling recording endeavors.

=== 1960s ===
In June 1960 Schoen moved back to Los Angeles after finishing work on The Big Record with Patti Page and The Dave King Show. In 1961 Schoen orchestrated on the film All Hands on Deck and was musical director for Shirley Temple's Storybook which aired on NBC from 1958 to 1961. In 1962 Schoen served as music director for the Andy Williams TV Show and the Pat Boone TV Show. In 1966, he composed for The Lone Ranger.

In the 1960s Schoen was working on a show in Las Vegas with Shirley Temple. He was injured in a car accident. When Danny Kaye heard about the accident, he immediately flew his own plane (Kaye was an avid pilot) to McCarran Airport to pick up Schoen and bring him back to Los Angeles to guarantee the best medical attention. Kapp Records approached Schoen about a new album called "The Sound of Top Brass: The Peter London Orchestra". Michael Kapp had felt that Schoen's name was so ubiquitous in the public by the early 1960s that they decided to create "Peter London", Schoen's pseudonym. Although his work slowed down in the 1960s, he still continued to compose and arrange. Schoen arranged two "space age-lounge" albums for Bobby Shad's Mainstream label, "Corcovado Trumpets" and "Girls with Brass", which were not as commercially successful as his earlier work from the 1950s.

Schoen decided in the late 1960s (after the public's musical tastes had changed) that he would like to start teaching at USC in Los Angeles. The school would not let him teach music unless he held a bachelor's degree. He started taking classes at a local Junior College in order to obtain the necessary degree, but he later remarked, "I only lasted a few months at the school, it wasn't for me." From 1965 to 1978, while living in Laguna Beach, Schoen served as the musical director for Laguna Beach's Pageant of the Masters, an annual production in which famous works of art are recreated in live tableaux. One show was based on the works of Norman Rockwell. Schoen commented that he greatly enjoyed composing music to accompany his paintings.

=== 1970s – later years ===
Schoen struggled with alcoholism and other demons and found it increasingly difficult to get jobs in the studio world (even selling some rights to his work in order to survive). He finally quit drinking in the mid-1970s and joined Alcoholics Anonymous. He attended meetings regularly until the late 1980s and helped many struggling alcoholics by recounting his anecdotes, funny stories, and life lessons he had learned throughout the years.

In the 1970s Schoen composed a four movement piano concerto entitled The Journey. He wrote the music to serve as a veritable musical journey around the world. Only a recording exists. The music is lost because Schoen thought the work would never be performed again—he tossed the score. Schoen had written so many arrangements throughout his life that he felt it was too much of a chore to store them—he had thrown out or lost almost all of the music he had written. He mentioned that after moving from country to country, coast to coast, it was too big of a job to lug the massive amount of music he had written. He once had a flood in his garage that ruined a huge amount of his library. Often, after a concert was over, Schoen would dispose of the scores and parts (he felt the music would never be played again). In his later years, however, he made more of an effort to hold on to his scores and albums. He began to search record stores and different venues to find his arrangements and recordings.

In 1974 Schoen provided some of the arrangements for the Sherman Brothers Broadway musical Over Here!. The opening night cast included Patty and Maxene Andrews (of the Andrews Sisters) and newcomers John Travolta, Treat Williams, Marilu Henner, Samuel E. Wright, and Ann Reinking, all of whom went on to achieve successful careers. It opened at the Schubert Theatre on March 6, 1974, and ran for 341 performances.

Although he was both an arranger and composer, Schoen moved into the direction of composing in his later years, finding it more rewarding. In 1981 due to financial pressures he and his wife Marion Hutton moved from Irvine, California to Kirkland, WA (a suburb of Seattle). While Schoen worked at home Hutton directed Residence XII, a drug addiction wing at a Kirkland hospital to help alcoholics and addicts (learning from her own experience as a recovered alcoholic).

After establishing himself in Seattle, he arranged and conducted the annual Evening of Pops show in 1982. This was a fundraiser for the drug rehab center Residence XII. In 1983 he arranged and conducted The Most Happy Fella for the Seattle Civic Light Opera. Schoen arranged music for Glenn Miller Remembered, a PBS production video taped in Seattle, 1984, starring Tex Beneke and Marion Hutton. A year later a television interview was aired on Schoen discussing his affiliation with Glenn Miller.

In 1984 Schoen composed "Ballet in Brass II" for two jazz band as well as "Suite For Two Jazz Bands and Concert Piano". The works were premiered at the North Seattle Community College. In 1985, Schoen composed music for a Boeing Company special show as it celebrated the 50th anniversary of its B-17 Flying Fortress. That same year he arranged and conducted Holiday Reunion, a fund-raiser for the Special Olympics performed at the Seattle Opera House. Patti Page and Schoen reunited for a 1986 stage show in Las Vegas.

Schoen was asked by Nico Snel (conductor of the Seattle Philharmonic Orchestra and Port Angeles Symphony) to write many arrangements for his pops concerts. In 1987 he wrote an arrangement for the Seattle Philharmonic combining the famous Claude Debussy piano piece Clair de Lune with Jerome Kern's Smoke Gets in Your Eyes. He called the piece Smoky Lune.

In the mid-1980s Frank Sinatra, Dean Martin, and Sammy Davis Jr. were performing in a traveling show. Upon arriving in Seattle, Sinatra heard that Schoen and Marion Hutton were living in Seattle, and invited them to socialize on the bus after the concert. In 1988 Schoen and Maxene Andrews reunited. Schoen arranged music for her stage show that was performed nationally and abroad. In 1989 the Seattle Philharmonic commissioned Schoen for an orchestral work to celebrate the centennial of the state of Washington. His work "Centennial" was premiered with the Seattle Philharmonic and pianist Joel Salsman. The piece was composed in a rhapsodic style for piano and orchestra. Schoen also re-orchestrated the work for the Tacoma Concert Band.

In 1990 he wrote an evening's worth of jazz arrangements for the Seattle Philharmonic and a full big band to perform at the same time. During this time he was asked to arrange and conduct music for one of George Shearing's concerts in Los Angeles. Shearing was a blind jazz pianist. There was a fermata in the middle of an arrangement where Shearing played a small cadenza. Schoen said to Shearing, "After you finish, I'll look over and nod, then we'll continue." After a brief pause Shearing said, "Actually, why don't I nod."

During his Seattle years Schoen wrote programs and fundraisers for the PBS station KCTS-TV as well as many works for the Seattle Philharmonic, Port Angeles Symphony, Everett Symphony, Tacoma Concert Band, Seattle Men's Chorus (Christmas TV special on KTZZ, with interview), Bellevue Community College, Northwest Winds Quintet, Harry James Band (based in Seattle, ran by Fred Radke), and Shoreline Community College.

After Schoen's wife Marion Hutton died in 1987, he married Sally-Jan Calbeck, an artist from Los Angeles. She moved to Seattle and after two years, they decided to move back to Los Angeles, finally settling in Corona del Mar. He participated in the Los Angeles musical scene and also attended ASMAC meetings.

Schoen met film composer John Williams backstage at a concert in Los Angeles in the 1990s, and Williams commented to him, "I was a big fan of your music when I was a kid." In 1999 Schoen reunited with Patti Page to record a CD for a Chinese label. One of Schoen's favorite singers to work with was Patti Page. She and Schoen had remained close friends and spoke regularly until his death. Schoen's only protégé is Los Angeles composer-arranger Kevin Kaska. Although his gigs were less frequent, Schoen never fully retired from music. "His music would never leave him alone to do that," remarked his fourth wife, Sally-Jan. He was proud of his ability to work in a wide variety of styles and joked that he could "write big band falling out of bed." Schoen died of pneumonia in Corona del Mar, California, in 2000.

== Personal life ==
Schoen was married four times:

- Yvette Agnes Gowdy (1943–48)
  - One son: David Schoen, photographer (born June 20, 1944; Home - davidschoen.com [contains artistic depictions of nudity])
- Kay Starr (1953)
- Marion Hutton (1954–87)
- Sally-Jan Calbeck (1994–2000)

In the 1960s, Schoen's closest personal friends were Pete Rugolo and Milton Berle. They spent a great deal of time together going to many parties and enjoying the social scene in Los Angeles.

== Discography ==
- Music for a Rainy Night, Decca DL8081
- A Letter to Laura, Decca DL8132
- Great Songs from All Over the World, Kapp K-1097-S
- Brass Laced with Strings, RCA Stereo Action LSA-2344
- Stereophonic Suite For Two Bands (later re-issue: Impact! Band Meets Band), Kapp KRL-4504
- A Swingers Holiday, Liberty LST-7018
- Corcovado Trumpets, Mainstream 56036-S/6036
- Girls with Brass, Mainstream MMS 705
