= Road to Rio =

1947 film by Norman Z. McLeod, Jack Rose

- Theatrical release poster
- Directed by: Norman McLeod
- Written by: Edmund Beloin; Jack Rose
- Produced by: Daniel Dare
- Starring: Bing Crosby; Bob Hope; Dorothy Lamour
- Cinematography: Ernest Laszlo
- Edited by: Ellsworth Hoagland
- Music by: Robert Emmett Dolan
- Color process: Black and white
- Production companies: Bing Crosby Productions; Hope Enterprises
- Distributed by: Paramount Pictures
- Release date: December 25, 1947
- Running time: 100 minutes
- Country: United States
- Language: English
- Budget: $2.4 million
- Box office: $4.5 million (US/ Canada rentals)

Road to Rio is a 1947 American musical comedy film directed by Norman Z. McLeod and starring Bing Crosby, Bob Hope, and Dorothy Lamour. Written by Edmund Beloin and Jack Rose, the film is about two inept vaudevillians who stow away on a Brazilian-bound ocean liner. Once in Brazil, they foil a plot by a sinister hypnotist to marry off her niece to a greedy fortune hunter. Road to Rio was the fifth of the "Road to ..." series.

== Plot ==
Musicians Scat Sweeney (Crosby) and Hot Lips Barton (Hope) are refugees from a swing quintet that has disbanded. Meanwhile, Lucia is a glamorous nightclub singer. Scat and Hot Lips join her as backing musicians on clarinet and trumpet.

They travel the United States trying to find work and stay away from girls. After running from state to state, each time retreating because of a girl, they stow away aboard a Rio-bound ship. They then get mixed up with the distraught Lucia, who first thanks them, then unexpectedly turns them over to the ship's captain. Unbeknownst to both of them, Lucia is being hypnotized by her crooked guardian, Catherine Vail. Vail plans to marry Lucia to her brother so she can control both her and a set of important "papers".

A nightclub owner has hired Scat and Hot Lips but he expects the full swing quintet. Scat and Hot Lips recruit three local musicians (the Wiere Brothers, who in the film cannot speak English) and coach them with a few phrases in jive talk, hoping to fool the nightclub owner.

Villainess Vail decides to do away with the boys permanently. She hypnotizes both of them and tries to get them to kill each other in a duel, but it fails. Scat and Hot Lips, finally figuring things out, rush to stop the wedding and catch the crooks. Scat seizes "the papers" and reads them. When Hot Lips asks what they are about, Scat tears them up and looks into the camera, saying, "The world must never know."

Later on, Scat is dismayed to see that Lucia loves Hot Lips and not him, but upon peeking through a keyhole, he sees Hot Lips hypnotizing her.

Hope's frequent sidekick Jerry Colonna has a cameo, leading a cavalry charge to rescue Bing and Bob, as the film cuts away to the galloping horses periodically. All is resolved before he can arrive, leading Colonna to point out: "Whaddaya know? We never quite made it. Exciting, though, wasn't it?"

== Cast ==
- Bing Crosby as Scat Sweeney
- Bob Hope as Hot Lips Barton
- Dorothy Lamour as Lucia Maria de Andrade
- Gale Sondergaard as Catherine Vail
- Frank Faylen as Trigger
- Joseph Vitale as Tony
- George Meeker as Sherman Mallory
- Frank Puglia as Rodrigues
- Nestor Paiva as Cardoso
- Robert Barrat as Johnson
- Stanley Andrews as Capt. Harmon
- Harry Woods as Ship's Purser
- The Wiere Brothers as Three Musicians
- The Andrews Sisters as Themselves
- Jerry Colonna as himself
- Marquita Rivera as Nightclub Performer
- Tor Johnson as Sandor
- Dorothy Abbott as showgirl

== Production and reception ==
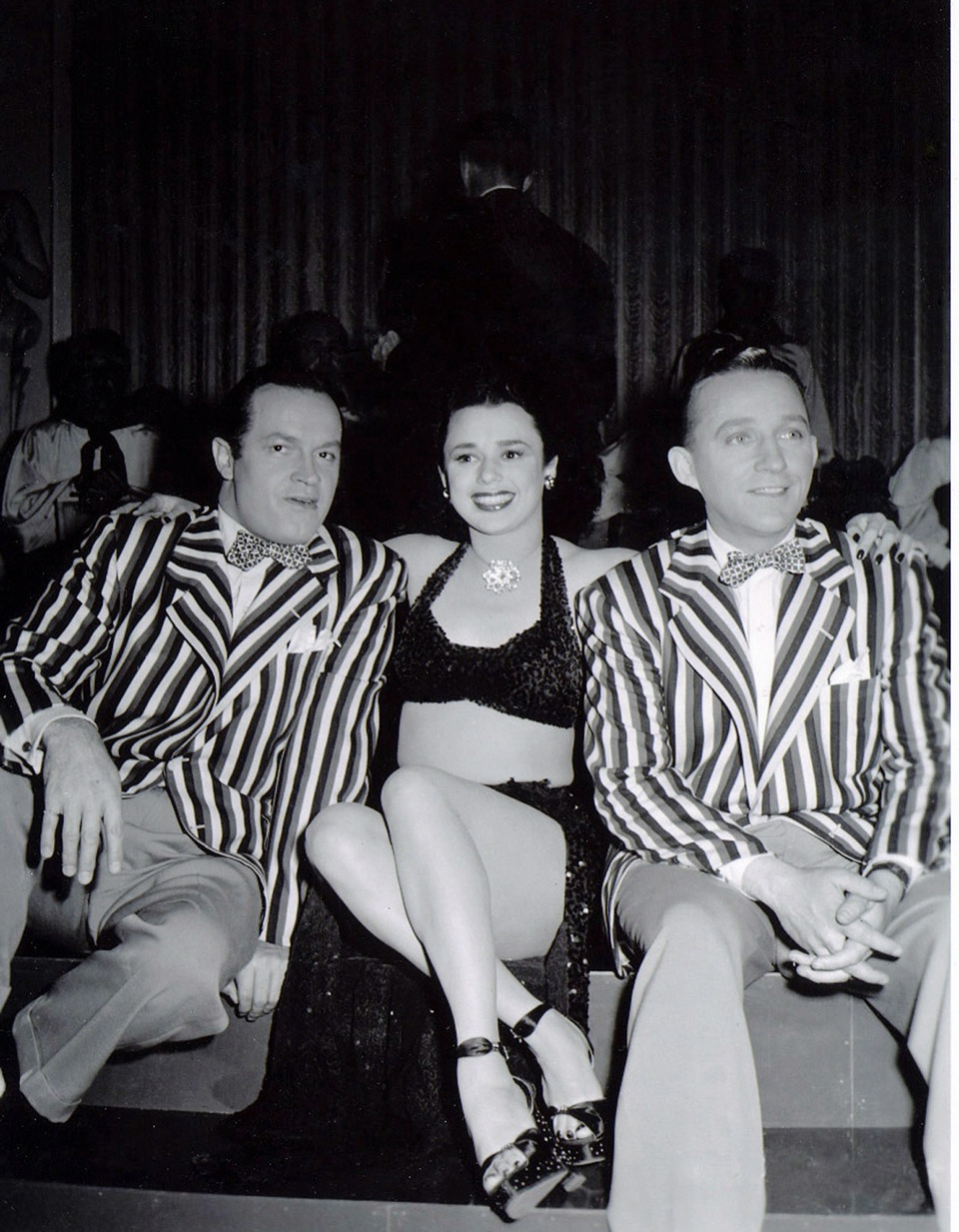
Marquita Rivera with Hope and Crosby during a break from filming

Filmed from January to March 1947, Road to Rio was financed by Crosby and Hope (1/3 share each) and Paramount (1/3 share). Crosby and Hope used the film to promote their latest investment, a soft drink called Lime Cola. The product had been invented in 1915 but the company wasn't incorporated until 1945; its stock rose from $1 to $10 per share within one year, and the bottler declared a 50% dividend in 1946. At this point Crosby and Hope, always on the lookout for worthwhile investments, bought a substantial interest in Lime Cola.

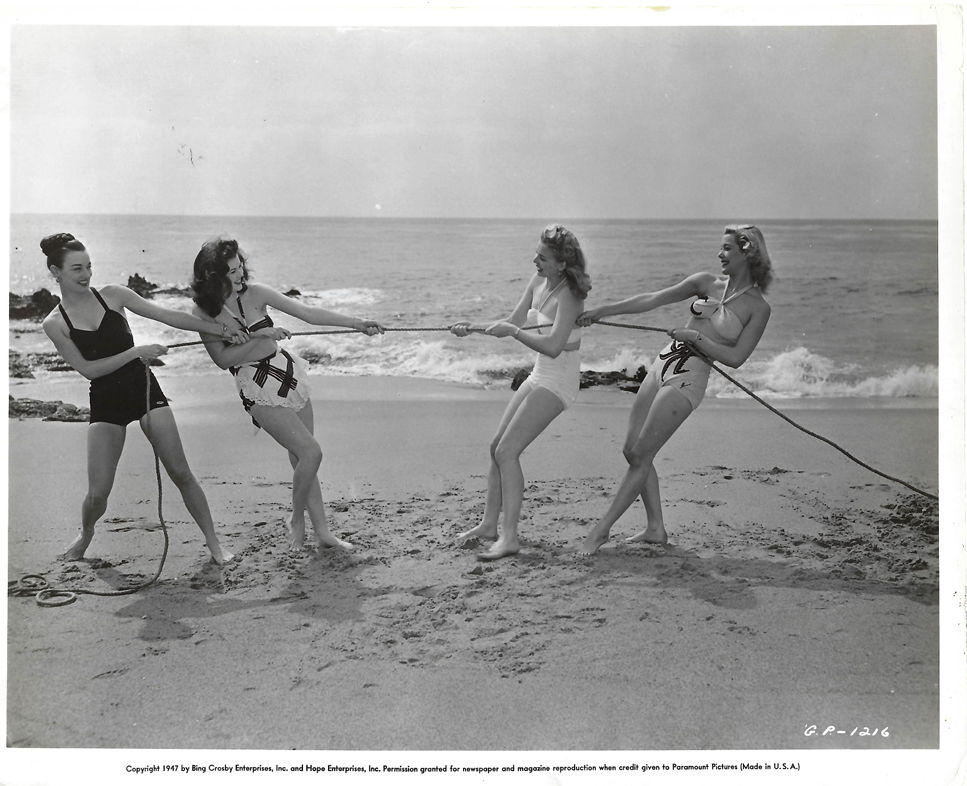
Publicity photo from the movie featuring showgirls Sally Rawlinson, Marliyn Gray, Dorothy Abbott and Kathy Young in a playful tug-of-war

They insisted that signs and posters for Lime Cola must appear in the background throughout Road to Rio. Paramount's president Y. Frank Freeman objected, but because Crosby and Hope were the film's majority owners, the posters stayed in. Crosby and Hope even tried to create interest with an original song in the movie. They wanted the name of a city that included the word "cola", but Florida's Pensacola was too close to soft-drink rival Pepsi-Cola. They settled on Apalachicola, another town in Florida, and in the film's first song number they chanted over and over, "Apalachi-COLA! Apalachi-COLA!"

The blatant plugs went for naught when demand far exceeded supply, and the Lime Cola Company filed for reorganization in April 1948. Crosby and Hope, with heavy interests in the company, lost their considerable investments.

Road to Rio produced $4.5 million in rental income in its initial release period in the United States and was placed sixth in the top-grossing films of 1947. Variety reviewed it at a tradeshow: "This celluloid junket along The Road to Rio should find smooth riding to sturdy box-office. The pattern established by other Paramount Road pictures is solidly followed by Daniel Dare's production to keep the laughs spilling and the paying customers satisfied." Showmen's Trade Review raved: "Hilarity reigns supreme, with Crosby and Hope practically knocking themselves out and apparently having a swell time doing it. Great entertainment. Business should be outstanding in all situations." Thomas M. Pryor of The New York Times was more guarded but still positive: "With Bing Crosby and Bob Hope on the tramp again in Road to Rio, recklessly scattering jokes and rescuing perennial girl friend Dorothy Lamour from dangerous hypnotic trances, there's fun to be had at the Paramount. Maybe this is not the funniest picture ever made; maybe it is not even quite as rewarding as some of those earlier journeys, but there are patches in this crazy quilt that are as good and, perhaps, even better than anything the boys have done before. They are traversing more of a rollercoaster highway than usual this time and so there are some tedious uphill pulls when the huffing and puffing is excessive and the results negligible. However, when they reach the top "Road to Rio" is irresistible... All that matters really is that "Road to Rio" is fairly well loaded with laughs."

Later reception has been more mixed. Clinical psychologist Deirdre Barrett emphasizes the hyper-(un)realistic use of verbal hypnotic induction as a central plot device in Road to Rio as part of her analysis of mid-20th-century tropes and stereotypes of hypnosis in popular culture.

The film was preserved by the UCLA Film & Television Archive.

== Soundtrack ==
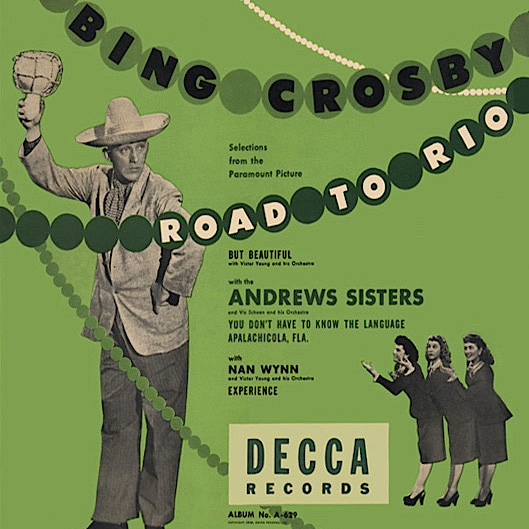
Road to Rio (Decca Records 1948)

- "Apalachicola, Fla" (Jimmy Van Heusen / Johnny Burke) including a few lines from Swanee River and Carry Me Back to Old Virginny, sung by Bing Crosby and Bob Hope.
- "But Beautiful" (Jimmy Van Heusen / Johnny Burke), sung by Bing Crosby
- "You Don't Have to Know the Language" (Jimmy Van Heusen / Johnny Burke): sung by Bing Crosby and the Andrews Sisters
- "Experience" (Jimmy Van Heusen / Johnny Burke), sung by Dorothy Lamour
- "Batuque No Morro" (Russo do Pandeiro / Sá Róris): sung by chorus, with parody lines by Bing Crosby and Bob Hope

Another song, "For What?" by Burke and Van Heusen, was written for the film, but dropped from the released print.

Crosby recorded four of the songs for Decca Records and these were also issued on a 78 rpm album titled Selections from Road to Rio. "But Beautiful" and "You Don't Have to Know the Language" made fleeting appearances in the Billboard charts. Crosby's songs were also included in the Bing's Hollywood series.

Lobby card
