= Go West =

Go West may refer to:

- "Go West, young man", a quote often attributed to American author Horace Greeley concerning America's expansion westward
- A euphemism for death

== Companies ==
- Go West, a division of NZ Bus that operates bus services between Auckland's West and central suburbs

== Film, art and entertainment ==
- Go West (1925 film), a 1925 film by Buster Keaton
- Go West (1940 film), a 1940 Marx Brothers comedy film
- Go West (2005 film), a 2005 Bosnian film directed by Ahmed Imamović
- Go West (exhibition), the Stuckist art show in Spectrum London gallery, 2006
- Go West, a manga by Yu Yagami
- Go West, a 2023 film by the original cast of Studio C

== Music ==
- Go West (band), a British pop band successful through the 1980s and 1990s
  - Go West (Go West album), the band's first album in 1985
- Go West (Village People album), a 1979 album by the Village People

=== Songs ===
- "Go West" (song), a 1979 song by the Village People, covered by Pet Shop Boys in 1993
- "Go West", a song by Liz Phair on the 1994 album Whip-Smart
- "Go West", a song by Chris Spedding on the 1986 album Enemy Within
- "Go West (Crazy Spinning Circles)", a song by The Cult on the 1984 album Dreamtime
- "Go West Young Man (In The Motherlode)", alternative title for the Genesis song "Deep in the Motherlode" for its US single release

== See also ==
- China Western Development, economic policy
- Gone West (disambiguation)
- Go West Young Man (disambiguation)
