= KTZZ =

Radio station in Conrad–Great Falls, Montana

- Conrad, Montana; United States
- Broadcast area: Great Falls, Montana
- Frequency: 93.7 MHz
- Branding: Z93

Programming
- Format: Defunct (was Classic rock)
- Affiliations: Westwood One; Premiere Radio Networks

Ownership
- Owner: Munson Radio
- Sister stations: KEIN

History
- First air date: 1998 (as KEIN-FM)
- Last air date: c. 2017
- Former call signs: KEIN-FM (1997–1999)

Technical information
- Licensing authority: FCC
- Facility ID: 81886
- Class: C1
- ERP: 100,000 watts
- HAAT: 170 meters (560 ft)
- Transmitter coordinates: 47°49′13″N 111°47′56″W

Links
- Public license information: Public file; LMS

KTZZ (93.7 FM, "Z93") was a radio station broadcasting a classic rock format. Licensed to Conrad, Montana, United States, the station served the Great Falls area. The station was owned by Munson Radio and featured programming from Westwood One and Premiere Radio Networks.

== History ==
The station was assigned the call sign KEIN-FM on June 13, 1997. This was changed on December 22, 1999, to KTZZ.

KTZZ's license was canceled by the Federal Communications Commission (FCC) on July 26, 2023. Owner Jeannine Mason disclosed in KTZZ's renewal application in January 2021 that she had lost control of the station's physical assets in March 2017, and was unable to determine the length of any discontinued operation; she did not respond to an FCC letter of inquiry in May 2023.
