= Gone West (novel) =

2012 novel by Carola Dunn

First edition (Minotaur Books)

Gone West (2012) is a work of detective fiction by Carola Dunn, the twentieth in her series about the Honourable Daisy Dalrymple, a woman in 1920s England who solves mysteries, to the consternation of her police chief husband, Alec Fletcher.

== Plot introduction ==
Daisy Dalrymple is invited by Sybil Sutherby, an acquaintance from her school days, to Eyrie Farm in Derbyshire, where Sybil works as the secretary to an author of pulp westerns, Humphrey Birtwhistle. Birtwhistle has been ill for the past two years, and in that time Sybil has taken over the actual writing of his novels. This arrangement has led to increased sales thanks to Sybil's greater gifts for character and dialogue. However, she has come to suspect that someone in the house might be drugging Humphrey to keep him unwell, so that Sybil will continue handling the writing and bringing more money to the farm. Then Humphrey dies and foul play is suspected. Daisy begins to investigate as her husband, Detective Chief Inspector Alec Fletcher, is called up from Scotland Yard to take the case.

== Characters ==
- Daisy Dalrymple, a wife, mother, and stepmother of aristocratic heritage, who is also a freelance writer
- Alec Fletcher, Daisy's husband, a Detective Chief Inspector with Scotland Yard
- Sybil Sutherby, a secretary and old acquaintance of Daisy's
- Humphrey Birtwhistle, an author of westerns who in his younger years travelled the Old West selling "patent nostrums"
- Ruby Birtwhistle, Humphrey's American wife
- Simon Birtwhistle, Humphrey and Ruby's son, an aspiring author
- Norman Birtwhistle, Humphrey's brother, who manages the farm
- Lorna Birtwhistle, who keeps the farmhouse
- Myra Olney, a relative of the Birtwhistles, and their charge
- Neil Carey, Simon's friend and one of Myra's suitors, an Irish playwright
- Walter Ilkton, one of Myra's suitors, an aristocrat
- Dr. Knox, Humphrey's personal physician
