= Larry Markes =

American screenwriter

Lawrence Wolcott Markes (September 24, 1921 – May 19, 1999) was an American comedian, singer and screenwriter.

Markes was born in Brooklyn, New York, and decided at an early age to become a writer. Soon after graduating from the University of Miami, he started setting lyrics to the melody of another young songwriter, Dick Charles. Their first hit was "Mad About Him, Sad About Him, How Can I Be Glad Without Him Blues" (1942), which Dinah Shore recorded successfully for Columbia Records.

During World War II, Markes was in the US Army Air Forces. He left the service in 1945, returning to New York and his songwriting collaboration with Charles. They wrote "Along the Navajo Trail", with Eddie De Lange, which was recorded by Bing Crosby and the Andrews Sisters, Dinah Shore, and the Gene Krupa Band. Other songs included "I Tipped My Hat (and Slowly Rode Away)," "It Takes a Long, Long Train with a Red Caboose to Carry My Blues Away," and "May You Always." But his biggest hit was "I.O.U.," co-written (and sung) by Jimmy Dean, which sold more than a million copies. "I.O.U." is a son's acknowledgment of the debts he owes his mother and is frequently played by radio stations on Mother's Day.

Markes also began writing continuity for radio programmes.

After moving to Los Angeles, California in the 1960s, he turned to screenwriting, including the films For Love or Money (1963), and Wild and Wonderful (1965), which starred Tony Curtis. He also wrote for television series Bonanza, Love American Style, McHale's Navy, The Flintstones, Room for One More, My Three Sons, The Jonathan Winters Show, and I Dream of Jeannie.

During Ronald Reagan's two terms as Governor of California (1966–1974), Markes added humor into his political speeches.

Markes died in Los Angeles in May 1999, at the age of 77.
