= Along the Navajo Trail (song) =

1945 country-pop song

"Along the Navajo Trail" is a country/pop song, written by Dick Charles (pseudonym for Richard Charles Krieg), Larry Markes and Eddie DeLange in 1945, and first recorded by Dinah Shore in May 1945.

== Background ==
It was the title song of the 1945 Roy Rogers film Along the Navajo Trail. It was also used in the 1945 film Don't Fence Me In, when it was sung by Roy Rogers and the Sons of the Pioneers.
Members of the Western Writers of America chose it as one of the Top 100 Western songs of all time.

== Charts ==
Charted versions in 1945 were by Bing Crosby and The Andrews Sisters (recorded June 29, 1945) (No. 2); Gene Krupa (vocal by Buddy Stewart) (No. 7); and Dinah Shore (No. 7).

== Other recordings ==
The song has been recorded by many other artists, including:

- Steve Conway (1946)
- Sam Cooke - included on his album Encore (1958).
- Duane Eddy - included on his album Especially for You (1959).
- Fats Domino (1963)
- Steve Kuhn and Toshiko Akiyoshi on their The Country and Western Sound of Jazz Pianos (1963)
- Riders in the Sky - for their album Riders Go Commercial (1989)
- Bob Wills and the Texas Playboys. From the album The Tiffany Transcriptions Vol. 4: You're From Texas!, released in 1985.
