= The Andrews Sisters =

American vocal group

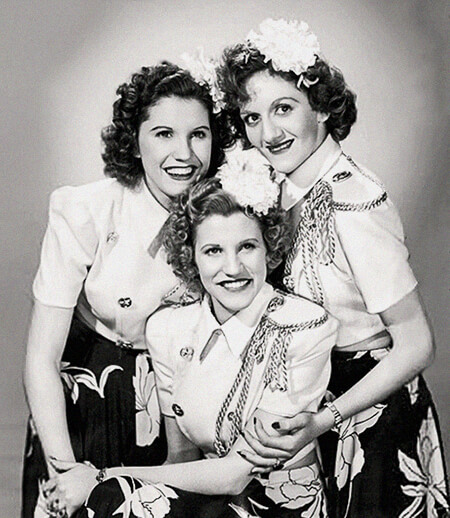
- Maxene (top left), LaVerne (top right), and Patty (center) in October 1943

Background information
- Origin: Minneapolis, Minnesota, U.S.
- Genres: Swing; boogie-woogie
- Years active: 1925–1953, 1956–1966 (trio); 1967–1968, 1973–1974 (Maxene and Patty)
- Past members: LaVerne Andrews; Maxene Andrews; Patty Andrews
- Website: cmgww.com/music/andrews

The Andrews Sisters were an American close harmony singing group of the swing and boogie-woogie eras. The group consisted of three sisters: contralto LaVerne Sophia Andrews (1911–1967), soprano Maxene Anglyn Andrews (1916–1995), and mezzo-soprano Patricia Marie Andrews (1918–2013). The sisters have sold an estimated 80 million records. Their 1941 hit "Boogie Woogie Bugle Boy" can be considered an early example of jump blues. Other songs closely associated with the Andrews Sisters include their first major hit, "Bei Mir Bist Du Schön (Means That You're Grand)" (1937), "Beer Barrel Polka (Roll Out the Barrel)" (1939), "Beat Me Daddy, Eight to the Bar" (1940), "Don't Sit Under the Apple Tree (with Anyone Else but Me)" (1942), and "Rum and Coca-Cola" (1945), which helped introduce American audiences to calypso.

The Andrews Sisters' harmonies and songs are still influential, having been copied and recorded by entertainers such as Patti Page, Bette Midler, Christina Aguilera, The Pointer Sisters, and Pentatonix. The group was among the inaugural inductees to the Vocal Group Hall of Fame upon opening in 1998. Writing for Bloomberg, Mark Schoifet said the sisters became the most popular female vocal group of the first half of the 20th century. They remain widely acclaimed for their close harmonies, and were inducted into the Minnesota Rock/Country Hall of Fame in May 2006.

== Early life ==
The sisters were born to Olga Bergliot "Ollie" (née Sollie; 1886—1948) and Peter Andreas. Peter Andreas (later "Andrews"), (1890—1949) was Greek and his wife Olga Andrews was of Norwegian ancestry raised in the Lutheran faith. The Sollie family disapproved of Olga's marriage, but the relationship was repaired once their first child, LaVerne, was born July 6, 1911. Their second daughter, Anglyn, died at eight months of age on March 16, 1914. Maxene arrived on January 3, 1916, and Patty was born February 16, 1918.

Patty, the lead singer of the group, was 7 when the trio was formed, and 12 when they won first prize at a talent contest at the local Orpheum Theatre in Minneapolis, where LaVerne played piano accompaniment for the silent film showings in exchange for dancing lessons for her and her sisters. Following the collapse of their father's Minneapolis restaurant, the sisters went on the road to support the family. All three attended Franklin Junior High School and North High School, both in Minneapolis.

== Career ==
=== History ===
"Bei Mir Bist Du Schön" (1937)
Sample of the 1937 cover "Bei Mir Bist Du Schön" by the Andrews Sisters.

They started their career as imitators of an earlier successful singing group, the Boswell Sisters, who had been popular until their breakup in 1936. After singing with various dance bands and touring in vaudeville with Leon Belasco (and his orchestra) and comic bandleader Larry Rich, they first came to national attention with their recordings and radio broadcasts in 1937, most notably via their major Decca record hit, "Bei Mir Bist Du Schön" (translation: "To Me, You Are Beautiful"), originally a Yiddish tune, the lyrics of which Sammy Cahn had translated to English and "which the girls harmonized to perfection." They followed this success with a string of best-selling records over the next two years and, by the 1940s, had become a household name.

Instrumental to the sisters' success over the years were their parents, Olga and Peter, their orchestra leader and musical arranger, Vic Schoen (1916–2000), and Jack and David Kapp, who founded Decca Records.

==== World War II ====
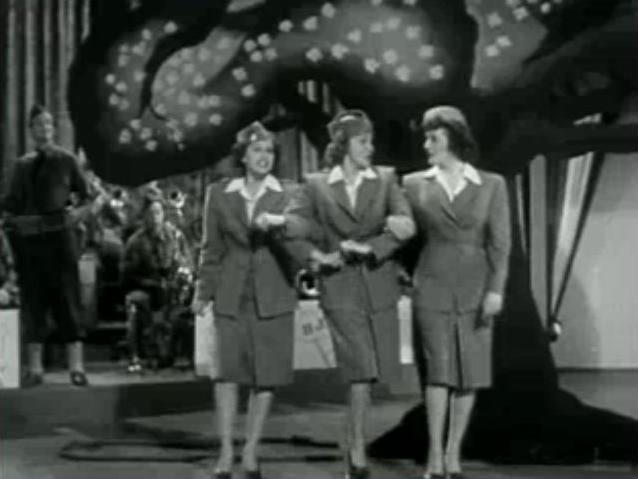
The Andrews Sisters singing 'Don't Sit Under The Apple Tree (With Anyone Else But Me)' in the 1942 film Private Buckaroo

In the years just before and during World War II, the Andrews Sisters were at the height of their popularity, and the group still tends to be associated in the public's mind with the war years. They had numerous hit records during these years, both on their own and in collaboration with fellow Decca Records artist Bing Crosby. Some of these hits had service or military related themes, including "Boogie Woogie Bugle Boy", "Three Little Sisters", "Don't Sit Under the Apple Tree (with Anyone Else but Me)", "A Hot Time In the Town of Berlin" and "Rum and Coca-Cola". The sisters performed their hits in service comedy films, such as Buck Privates and Private Buckaroo.

"Boogie Woogie Bugle Boy" (1941)
Sample of "Boogie Woogie Bugle Boy" by the Andrews Sisters.

During the war, they entertained the Allied forces extensively in Africa and Italy, as well as in the U.S., visiting Army, Navy, Marine, and Coast Guard bases, war zones, hospitals, and munitions factories. They encouraged U.S. citizens to purchase war bonds with their rendition of Irving Berlin's song "Any Bonds Today?". They also helped actress Bette Davis and actor John Garfield found California's famous Hollywood Canteen, a welcome retreat for servicemen where the trio often performed, volunteering their personal time to sing and dance for the soldiers, sailors, and Marines (they did the same at New York City's Stage Door Canteen during the war).

While touring, they often treated three random servicemen to dinner when they were dining out. They recorded a series of Victory Discs (V-Discs) for distribution to Allied fighting forces only, again volunteering their time for studio sessions for the Music Branch, Special Service Division, of the Army Service Forces, and they were dubbed the "Sweethearts of the Armed Forces Radio Service" for their many appearances on shows such as Command Performance, Mail Call, and G.I. Journal.

"Rum and Coca-Cola" (1945)
Sample of the 1945 cover "Rum and Coca-Cola" by the Andrews Sisters.

The sisters' 1945 hit "Rum and Coca-Cola" became one of their most popular and best-known recordings, but also inspired some controversy. Some radio stations were reluctant to play the record because it mentioned a commercial product by name, and because the lyrics were subtly suggestive of local women prostituting themselves to U.S. servicemen serving at the naval base on Trinidad. The song was based on a Trinidadian calypso, and a dispute over its provenance led to a well-publicized court case. The sisters later told biographers that they were asked to record the tune at short notice and were unaware either of the copyright issue or of the implications of the lyrics.

=== Interruption ===
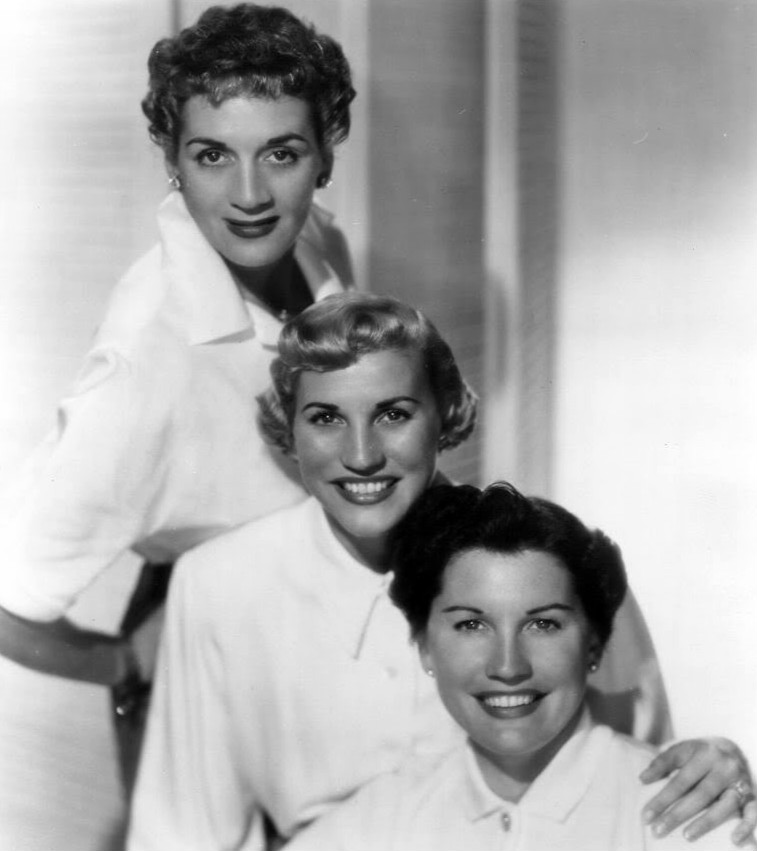
The Andrews Sisters in April 1952, one year before their formal break-up. From top: LaVerne, Patty, Maxene.

An ad in the 1951 Radio Annual showed photos of the Andrews as children, as contemporary singers, and as old women in the then-future year of 1975, although the act would not make it that long. In the 1950s, Patty Andrews decided to break away from the act to be a soloist. She had married the trio's pianist, Walter Weschler, who became the group's manager and demanded more money for Patty. When LaVerne and Maxene learned of Patty's decision from newspaper gossip columns rather than from their own sister, it caused a bitter two-year separation, especially when Patty sued LaVerne for a larger share of their parents' estate. Patty attributed the breakup to the deaths of their parents: "We had been together nearly all our lives," Patty explained in 1971. "Then in one year our dream world ended. Our mother died (in 1948) and then our father (in 1949). All three of us were upset, and we were at each other's throats all the time." The Andrews Sisters formally broke up in 1953.

LaVerne and Maxene tried to continue the act as a duo and met with good press during a 10-day tour of Australia, but a reported suicide attempt by Maxene in December 1954 put a halt to any further tours (Maxene spent a short time in the hospital after swallowing 18 sleeping pills, an occurrence that LaVerne told reporters was an accident). LaVerne and Maxene did appear together on The Red Skelton Show on October 26, 1954, singing the humorous "Why Do They Give the Solos to Patty" as well as lip-synching "Beer Barrel Polka" with Skelton in drag filling in for Patty. This, however, did not sit well with Patty, and a cease-and-desist order was sent to Skelton. The sisters' private relationship was often troubled, and Patty blamed it on Maxene: "Ever since I was born, Maxene has been a problem, and that problem hasn't stopped," she said.

The trio reunited in 1956 and signed a new recording deal with Capitol Records, for whom Patty was already a featured soloist. By this point, however, rock-and-roll and doo-wop were dominating the charts, and older artists were left by the wayside. The sisters recorded a dozen singles through 1959, some of which attempted to keep up with the times by incorporating rock sounds. None of these achieved any major success. In addition, they produced three hi-fi albums, including a vibrant LP of songs from the dancing 1920s with Billy May's orchestra. In 1962, they signed with Dot Records and recorded a series of stereo albums until 1967, both re-recordings of earlier hits which incorporated up-to-date production techniques as well as new material, including "I Left My Heart in San Francisco", "Still", "The End of the World", "Puff the Magic Dragon", "Sailor", "Satin Doll", "Mr. Bass Man", the theme from Come September, and the theme from A Man and a Woman. They toured extensively during the 1960s, favoring top nightclubs in Las Vegas, California, and London, England.

Eldest sister LaVerne died in 1967 at the age of 55 after a year-long bout with cancer, during which she was replaced by singer Joyce DeYoung (May 24, 1926 – March 7, 2014). DeYoung fulfilled concert appearances, including an appearance on The Dean Martin Show on November 30, 1967, but she did not record with Maxene and Patty. LaVerne had founded the original group and often acted as the peacemaker among the three during the sisters' lives, more often siding with her parents, to whom the girls were extremely devoted, than with either of her sisters. Their last appearance together as a trio was on The Dean Martin Show on September 29, 1966.

After LaVerne died, Maxene and Patty continued to perform periodically until 1968, when Maxene became the Dean of Women at Tahoe Paradise College, teaching acting, drama, and speech, and working with troubled teens; and Patty was once again eager to be a soloist.

In 1969, Patty appeared in Lucille Ball's third series Here's Lucy, in the sixth episode of the second season, titled "Lucy and the Andrews Sisters". The episode has Patty enlisting the help of Lucy, her daughter Kim (played by Lucie Arnaz), and her son Craig (Desi Arnaz Jr.) to perform a medley of Andrews Sisters hits for the Andrews Sisters Fan Club reunion. Lucy played LaVerne, Kim (Lucie Arnaz) played Maxene, and Craig (Desi Arnaz Jr.) played Bing Crosby. She also had a cameo as herself, along with many other stars, in the 1970 film The Phynx.

==== Comeback ====
Maxene and Patty's careers experienced a resurgence when Bette Midler covered "Boogie Woogie Bugle Boy" in 1972. The next year, the pair debuted on Broadway in the Sherman Brothers' nostalgic and successful World War II musical: Over Here!, which premiered at the Shubert Theatre. This was a follow-up to Patty's success in Victory Canteen, a 1971 California revue. Over Here! starred Maxene and Patty, with Janie Sell filling in for LaVerne and winning a Tony Award for her performance. It was written with the sisters in mind for the leads. The musical launched the careers of many now notable theater, film, and television stars, including John Travolta, Marilu Henner, Treat Williams, and Ann Reinking. It was the last major tour for the sisters and was cut short due to a conflict with the show's producers over pay for the sisters. This also resulted in the cancellation of an extensively scheduled road tour. Over Here! lasted only a year, and its end marked the last time the sisters would ever sing together.

Patty continually distanced herself from Maxene, until her death, and would not explain her motives regarding the separation. Maxene appealed to Patty for a reunion, personally if not professionally, both in public and in private, but to no avail. Maxene suffered a serious heart attack while performing in Illinois in 1982 and underwent quadruple bypass surgery, from which she successfully recovered. Patty visited her sister while she was hospitalized. Now sometimes appearing as "Patti" (but still signing autographs as "Patty"), she re-emerged in the late 1970s as a regular panelist on The Gong Show. Maxene had a successful comeback as a cabaret soloist in 1979 and toured worldwide for the next 15 years, recording a solo album in 1985 entitled Maxene: An Andrews Sister for Bainbridge Records. Patty started her own solo act in 1980, but did not receive the critical acclaim her sister had for her performances, even though Patty was considered to be the "star" of the group for years. The critics' major complaint was that Patty's show concentrated too much on Andrews Sisters material, which did not allow Patty's own talents as an expressive and bluesy vocalist to shine through.

The two sisters did reunite, albeit briefly, on October 1, 1987, when they received a star on Hollywood's Walk of Fame, even singing a few bars of "Beer Barrel Polka" for the Entertainment Tonight cameras. The 1987 Whittier Narrows earthquake had shaken the area that morning and the ceremony was nearly cancelled, which caused Patty to joke, "Some people said that earthquake this morning was LaVerne because she couldn't be here, but really it was just Maxene and me on the telephone." Besides this, and a few brief private encounters, they remained somewhat estranged for their remaining years.

Shortly after her Off-Broadway debut in New York City in a show called Swingtime Canteen, Maxene suffered another heart attack and died at Cape Cod Hospital on October 21, 1995, making Patty the last surviving Andrews Sister. Not long before she died, Maxene told music historian William Ruhlmann:

I have nothing to regret. We got on the carousel and we each got the ring and I was satisfied with that. There's nothing I would do to change things if I could...Yes, I would. I wish I had the ability and the power to bridge the gap between my relationship with my sister, Patty.

Upon hearing the news of her sister's death, Patty became distraught. Several days later, Patty's husband, Wally, fell down a flight of stairs and broke both of his wrists. As a result, Patty did not attend either the California or New York memorial services for Maxene. Bob Hope said of Maxene's death, "She was more than part of The Andrews Sisters, much more than a singer. She was a warm and wonderful lady who shared her talent and wisdom with others."

=== As musical innovators ===
They found instant appeal with teenagers and young adults who were engrossed in the swing and jazz idioms, especially when they performed with nearly all of the major big bands, including those led by Glenn Miller, Benny Goodman, Buddy Rich, Tommy Dorsey, Jimmy Dorsey, Gene Krupa, Joe Venuti, Freddie Slack, Eddie Heywood, Bob Crosby (Bing's brother), Desi Arnaz, Guy Lombardo, Les Brown, Bunny Berigan, Xavier Cugat, Paul Whiteman, Ted Lewis, Nelson Riddle, and Gordon Jenkins.

=== Many styles ===
While the sisters specialized in traditional pop, swing, boogie-woogie, and novelty hits with their trademark lightning-quick vocal syncopations, they also produced major hits in jazz, ballads, folk, country, seasonal, and religious titles, being the first Decca artists to record an album of gospel standards in 1950. Their versatility allowed them to pair with many different artists in the recording studios, producing Top 10 hits with the likes of Bing Crosby (the only recording artist of the 1940s to sell more records than the Andrews Sisters), Danny Kaye, Dick Haymes, Carmen Miranda, Al Jolson, Ray McKinley, Burl Ives, Ernest Tubb, Red Foley, Dan Dailey, Alfred Apaka, and Les Paul. In personal appearances, on radio and on television, they sang with everyone from Rudy Vallee, Judy Garland, and Nat "King" Cole, to Jimmie Rodgers, Andy Williams, and the Supremes. Some of the trio's late 1930s recordings have noticeable Boswell Sisters vocal influences.

== Marriages, family, and deaths ==
LaVerne Andrews married Lou Rogers, a trumpet player in Vic Schoen's band, in 1948. The two remained together until LaVerne's death from liver cancer on May 8, 1967, at the age of 55. Lou died in 1995.

Maxene Andrews married music publisher Lou Levy in 1941, separating in 1949. They adopted a girl and a boy, Aleda Ann and Peter. Levy was the sisters' manager from 1937 to 1951. Later in life, according to her daughter, Maxene entered a twenty-one year relationship with a woman and spent her latter years (1974-1995) with her manager Lynda Wells as life partners. "To me, being gay was not a central focus of Maxene's life at all," Wells told radio station The Current (KCMP) in a 2019 interview. "Her art was. Her singing was." However, Wells says that their status as companions, and Maxene's health issues as she got older, led Maxene to adopt her as a daughter. "There was no such thing as being married at that time," she said. "During her lifetime, there was no such thing that existed for us." Maxene died October 21, 1995, at age 79; Lynda died May 2, 2026, at age 84. The ashes of LaVerne and Maxene Andrews are interred in the Columbarium of Memory of the Forest Lawn Memorial Park Cemetery in Glendale, California, near the ashes of their parents. The ashes of Patty Andrews were also interred along with the family as well as a memorial plaque in memory of their sister Angelyn (1913-1914).

Patty Andrews married agent Marty Melcher in 1947, but left him in 1949 when he pursued a romantic relationship with Doris Day. She then married Walter Weschler, the trio's pianist, in 1951. They adopted one daughter, Pam Dubois. Patty died of natural causes at her home in Northridge, California, on January 30, 2013, at the age of 94. Weschler, her husband of nearly 60 years, had died on August 28, 2010, at the age of 88.

Joyce DeYoung Murray, who replaced LaVerne from late 1966 to 1968, died in March 2014 at the age of 87.

== Legacy ==
The Andrews Sisters were the most imitated of all female singing groups and influenced many artists, including Mel Tormé, Les Paul and Mary Ford, the Four Freshmen, the Supremes, the Beach Boys, the McGuire Sisters, the Lennon Sisters, the Pointer Sisters, the Manhattan Transfer, Barry Manilow, and Bette Midler. Their style was even emulated internationally; the Harmony Sisters, a popular Finland group that performed from the 1930s to the 1950s, was one such example.

Most of the Andrews Sisters' music has been restored and released in compact disc form. Over 300 of their original Decca recordings, a good portion of which was hit material, has yet to be released by MCA/Decca. Many of their Decca recordings have been used in such television shows and Hollywood movies as Homefront, ER, Agent Carter, The Brink's Job, National Lampoon's Christmas Vacation, Swing Shift, Raggedy Man, Summer of '42, Slaughterhouse-Five, Maria's Lovers, Harlem Nights, In Dreams, Murder in the First, L.A. Confidential, American Horror Story, Just Shoot Me, Gilmore Girls, Mama's Family, War and Remembrance, Jakob the Liar, Lolita, The Polar Express, The Chronicles of Narnia, Molly: An American Girl on the Home Front, Memoirs of a Geisha, and Bon Voyage, Charlie Brown (and Don't Come Back!!). Comical references to the trio in television sitcoms can be found as early as I Love Lucy and as recently as Everybody Loves Raymond. In 2007, their version of "Bei Mir Bist Du Schön" was included in the game BioShock, a first-person shooter that takes place in an alternate history 1960, and later in 2008, their song "Civilization" (with Danny Kaye) was included in the Atomic Age-inspired video game Fallout 3. The 2010 video game Mafia II features numerous Andrews Sisters songs, with "Boogie Woogie Bugle Boy", "Strip Polka" and "Rum and Coca-Cola". The 2011 video game L.A. Noire features the song "Pistol Packin' Mama", where the sisters perform a duet with Bing Crosby. The sisters were again featured in a Fallout game in 2015, when their songs "Pistol Packin' Mama" and "Civilization" were featured in the game Fallout 4.

Christina Aguilera used the Andrews Sisters' "Boogie Woogie Bugle Boy" to inspire her song "Candyman" (released as a single in 2007) from her hit album Back to Basics. The song was co-written by Linda Perry. The London-based trio the Puppini Sisters uses their style harmonies on several Andrews Sisters and other hits of the 1940s and 1950s, as well as later rock and disco hits. The trio have said their name is a tribute to the Andrews Sisters. The National WW2 Museum's Victory Belles pay tribute to the Andrews Sisters, performing their music daily in the Stage Door Canteen in New Orleans. The Manhattan Dolls, a New York City-based touring group, performs both the popular songs sung by the Andrews Sisters and some of the more obscure ones, such as "Well Alright" and "South American Way".

In 2008 and 2009, the BBC produced The Andrews Sisters: Queens of the Music Machines, a one-hour documentary on the history of the Andrews Sisters from their upbringing to the present. The North American premiere of the show was June 21, 2009, in their summer vacation enclave of Mound, Minnesota. In 2008, Mound dedicated "The Andrews Sisters Trail". The sisters spent summers in Mound with their uncles Pete and Ed Solie, who had a grocery store there. Maxene Andrews always said that the summers in Mound created a major sense of "normalcy" and "a wonderful childhood" in a life that otherwise centered on the sisters' careers. The Westonka Historical Society has a large collection of Andrews Sisters memorabilia.

In 2019, the Great American Songbook Foundation held an exhibition titled "The Andrews Sisters: Queens of the Jukebox," which led discussions about the lives and impact of the Andrews sisters' careers on the music industry alongside a collection of archival artifacts and historic memorabilia. The Songbook Library & Archives houses most comprehensive collection of Andrews Sisters memorabilia available today.

The Bronx Zoo acquired three young female Asian Elephants in October 1973, which they named Laverne, Maxine (a slightly different spelling), and Patty in honor of the trio. As of May 2026, 57-year old Patty still resides at the Bronx Zoo today, while the other two elephants, Laverne and Maxine, died in 1982 and 2018, respectively.

== Filmography ==
Patty, Maxene, and LaVerne appeared in 17 Hollywood films. Their first picture, Argentine Nights, paired them with another enthusiastic trio, the Ritz Brothers. Universal Pictures, always budget-conscious, refused to hire a choreographer, so the Ritzes taught the sisters some eccentric steps. Thus, in Argentine Nights and the sisters' next film, Buck Privates, the Andrews Sisters dance like the Ritz Brothers.

Buck Privates, with Abbott and Costello, featured the Andrews Sisters' best-known song, "Boogie Woogie Bugle Boy." This Don Raye-Hughie Prince composition was nominated for Best Song at the 1941 Academy Awards ceremony.

Universal hired the sisters for two more Abbott and Costello comedies and then promoted them to full-fledged stardom in B musicals. What's Cookin'?, Private Buckaroo, Give Out, Sisters (in which they disguise themselves as old women as part of the zany plot) and Moonlight and Cactus were among the team's popular full-length films.

The Andrews Sisters sing the title song as the opening credits roll and also perform two specialty numbers in the all-star revue Hollywood Canteen (1944). They can be seen singing "You Don't Have to Know the Language" with Bing Crosby in Paramount's Road to Rio with Bob Hope, that year's highest-grossing movie. Their singing voices are heard in two full-length Walt Disney features: Make Mine Music, in a segment which featured animated characters Johnny Fedora and Alice Blue Bonnet; and Melody Time, in the segment "Little Toot" (both of which are available on DVD today).

== Stage and radio shows ==
The Andrews Sisters were the most sought-after singers in theater shows worldwide during the 1940s and early 1950s, always topping previous house averages. The trio headlined at the London Palladium in 1948 and 1951. They hosted their own radio shows for ABC and CBS from 1944 to 1951, singing specially written commercial jingles for such products as Wrigley's chewing gum, Dole pineapples, Nash motor cars, Kelvinator home appliances, Campbell's soups, and Franco-American food products. The western-themed The Andrews Sisters' Show (subtitled "Eight-to-the-Bar Ranch"), co-hosted by Gabby Hayes, began in 1944 and featured a special guest every week.

== Setting records ==
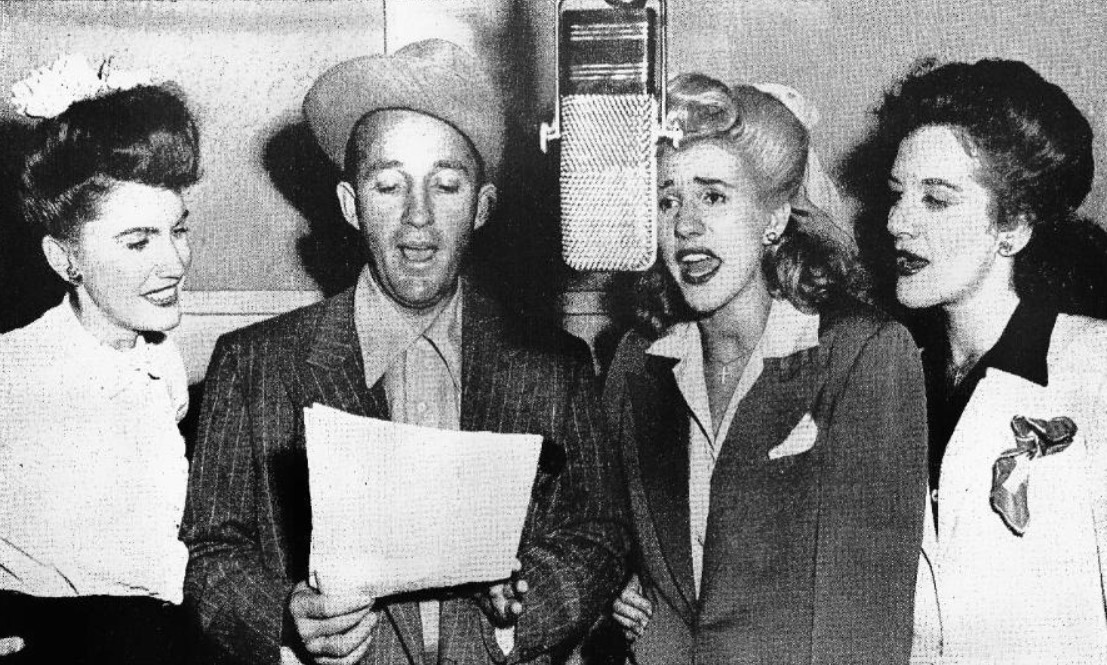
The Andrews Sisters performing with Bing Crosby on October 30, 1943

The trio recorded 47 songs with Bing Crosby, 23 of which charted on Billboard, thus making the team one of the most successful pairings of acts in a recording studio in show business history. Their million-sellers with Crosby included "Pistol Packin' Mama", "Don't Fence Me In", "South America, Take It Away", and "Jingle Bells".

The sisters' popularity was such that after the war, they discovered that some of their records had actually been smuggled into Germany, after the labels had been changed to read "Hitler's Marching Songs". Their recording of "Bei Mir Bist Du Schön" became a favorite of the Nazis, until it was discovered that the song's composers were of Jewish descent. This did not stop concentration camp inmates from secretly singing it, this being most likely because the song was originally a Yiddish song, "Bei Mir Bistu Shein", and had been popularized within the Jewish community before it was recorded as a more successful "cover" version by the Andrews Sisters.

Edward Habib, in the CD liner notes for Songs That Won the War Vol. 2 The Hollywood Canteen, states that the Andrews Sisters' radio transcription of "Elmer's Tune" was "so popular it even played on German radio," noting that "the opposition embraced the Andrews Sisters and their songs in the same way the Allied Forces adopted Lili Marlene."

Along with Bing Crosby, separately and jointly, the Andrews Sisters were among the performers who incorporated ethnic music styles into America's Hit Parade, popularizing or enhancing the popularity of songs with melodies originating in Brazil, Czechoslovakia, France, Ireland, Israel, Italy, Mexico, Russia, Spain, Sweden and Trinidad, many of which their manager chose for them.

The Andrews Sisters became the most popular female vocal group of the first half of the 20th century.

- 75–100 million records sold from a little over 600 recorded tunes
- 113 charted Billboard hits, 46 reaching Top 10 status (more than Elvis Presley or the Beatles)
- 17 Hollywood films (more than any other singing group in motion picture history)
- record-breaking theater and cabaret runs all across America and Europe;
- countless appearances on radio shows from 1935 to 1960 (including their own)
- guest spots on every major television show of the 1950s and 1960s, including those hosted by Ed Sullivan, Milton Berle, Perry Como, Frank Sinatra, Dean Martin, Sammy Davis Jr., Johnny Carson, Joey Bishop, Art Linkletter and Jimmy Dean.

Early comparative female close harmony trios were the Boswell Sisters, the Pickens Sisters, and the Three X Sisters.

== Repertoire ==
=== Discography ===
==== Albums ====
- Don't Fence Me In (with Bing Crosby) (1946, Decca)
- The Andrews Sisters (1946, Decca) (No. 5 on Billboard's albums chart)
- A Collection of Tropical Songs (1947, Decca)
- Selections from Road to Rio (with Bing Crosby) (1948, Decca)
- Irving Berlin Songs (1948, Decca)
- The Andrews Sisters in Hi-Fi (1957, Capitol)
- Fresh and Fancy Free (1957, Capitol)
- The Andrews Sisters Sing the Dancing '20s (1958, Capitol)
- Near You... (1958, Vocalion)
- Greatest Hits (1961, Dot)
- Great Golden Hits (1962, Dot)
- The Andrews Sisters Present (1963, Dot)
- Greatest Hits Vol. 2 (1963, Dot)
- Great Country Hits (1964, Dot)
- The Andrews Sisters Go Hawaiian (1965, Dot)
- Favorite Hymns (1965, Hamilton)
- The Andrews Sisters – Great Performers (1967, Dot)
- Boogie Woogie Bugle Girls (1973, Paramount)
- The Andrews Sisters in Over Here! (1974, Columbia)
- In The Mood (Famous Twinset Series) (1974, Paramount)
- Sixteen Great Performances (1980, MCA)
- 50th Anniversary Collection Volume One (1987, MCA)
- Christmas With The Andrews Sisters (1988, Pickwick)
- All-Time Favorites (10 Best Series) (1991, Cema)
- Their All Time Greatest Hits (1994, MCA)
- 20th Century Masters – The Millennium Collection: The Best of the Andrews Sisters (2000, MCA)

==== Chart records ====
Year	Single	Chart positions		
Year	Single	US	US R&B	US Country
1938	"Bei Mir Bist du Schön (Means That You're Grand)"	1	–	–
1938	"Nice Work If You Can Get It"	12	–	–
1938	"Joseph, Joseph"	18	–	–
1938	"Ti-Pi-Tin"	12	–	–
1938	"Shortenin' Bread"	16	–	–
1938	"Says My Heart"	10	–	–
1938	"Tu-li-Tulip Time"	9	–	–
1938	"Sha-Sha" (with Jimmy Van Heusen and Jimmy Dorsey)	17	–	–
1938	"Lullaby to a Jitterbug"	10	–	–
1939	"Pross-Tchai (Goodbye)"	15	–	–
1939	"Hold Tight, Hold Tight (Want Some Sea Food, Mama?)"	2	–	–
1939	"You Don't Know How Much You Can Suffer"	14	–	–
1939	"Beer Barrel Polka (Roll Out the Barrel)"	4	–	–
1939	"Well All Right (Tonight's the Night)"	5	–	–
1939	"Ciribiribin (They're So In Love)" (with Bing Crosby)	13	–	–
1939	"Yodelin' Jive" (with Bing Crosby)	4	–	–
1939	"Chico's Love Song"	11	–	–
1940	"Say Si Si (Para Vigo Me Voy)"	4	–	–
1940	"The Woodpecker Song"	6	–	–
1940	"Down By the O-Hi-O"	21	–	–
1940	"Rhumboogie"	11	–	–
1940	"Ferryboat Serenade"	1	–	–
1940	"Hit the Road"	27	–	–
1940	"Beat Me Daddy, Eight to the Bar"	2	–	–
1941	"Scrub Me, Mama, With a Boogie Beat"	10	–	–
1941	"Boogie Woogie Bugle Boy"	6	–	–
1941	"I Yi, Yi, Yi, Yi (I Like You Very Much)"	11	–	–
1941	"(I'll Be With You) In Apple Blossom Time"	5	–	–
1941	"Aurora"	10	–	–
1941	"Sonny Boy"	22	–	–
1941	"The Nickel Serenade"	22	–	–
1941	"Sleepy Serenade"	22	–	–
1941	"I Wish I Had a Dime (For Every Time I Missed You)"	20	–	–
1941	"Jealous"	12	–	–
1942	"The Shrine of St. Cecilia"	3	–	–
1942	"I'll Pray For You"	22	–	–
1942	"Three Little Sisters"	8	–	–
1942	"Don't Sit Under the Apple Tree"	16	–	–
1942	"Pennsylvania Polka"	17	–	–
1942	"That's the Moon, My Son"	18	–	–
1942	"Mister Five By Five"	14	–	–
1942	"Strip Polka"	6	–	–
1942	"Here Comes the Navy"	17	–	–
1943	"East of the Rockies"	18	–	–
1943	"Pistol Packin' Mama" (with Bing Crosby)	2	3	1
1943	"Victory Polka" (with Bing Crosby)	5	–	–
1943	"Jingle Bells" (with Bing Crosby)	19	–	–
1943	"Shoo-Shoo Baby"	1	–	–
1944	"Down In the Valley"	20	–	–
1944	"Straighten Up and Fly Right"	8	–	–
1944	"Tico Tico"	24	–	–
1944	"Sing a Tropical Song"	24	–	–
1944	"Is You Is Or Is You Ain't My Baby" (with Bing Crosby)	2	–	–
1944	"A Hot Time In the Town of Berlin" (with Bing Crosby)	1	–	–
1944	"Don't Fence Me In" (with Bing Crosby)	1	9	–
1945	"Rum and Coca-Cola"	1	3	–
1945	"Accentuate the Positive" (with Bing Crosby)	2	–	–
1945	"The Three Caballeros" (with Bing Crosby)	8	–	–
1945	"One Meat Ball"	15	–	–
1945	"Corns For My Country"	21	–	–
1945	"Along the Navajo Trail" (with Bing Crosby)	2	–	–
1945	"The Blond Sailor"	8	–	–
1946	"Money Is the Root of All Evil"	9	–	–
1946	"Patience and Fortitude"	12	–	–
1946	"Coax Me a Little Bit"	24	–	–
1946	"South America, Take It Away" (with Bing Crosby)	2	–	–
1946	"Get Your Kicks On Route 66" (with Bing Crosby)	14	–	–
1946	"I Don't Know Why"	17	–	–
1946	"House of Blue Lights"	15	–	–
1946	"Rumors Are Flying" (with Les Paul)	4	–	–
1946	"Winter Wonderland" (with Guy Lombardo)	22	–	–
1946	"Christmas Island" (with Guy Lombardo)	7	–	–
1947	"Tallahassee" (with Bing Crosby)	10	–	–
1947	"There's No Business Like Show Business" (with Bing Crosby and Dick Haymes)	25	–	–
1947	"On the Avenue"	21	–	–
1947	"Near You"	2	–	–
1947	"The Lady From 29 Palms"	7	–	–
1947	"The Freedom Train" (with Bing Crosby)	21	–	–
1947	"Civilization (Bongo, Bongo, Bongo)" (with Danny Kaye)	3	–	–
1947	"Jingle Bells" (re-entry: see 1943)	21	–	–
1947	"Santa Claus Is Comin' to Town" (with Bing Crosby)	22	–	–
1947	"Christmas Island" (re-entry: see 1946)	20	–	–
1947	"Your Red Wagon"	24	–	–
1947	"How Lucky You Are"	22	–	–
1948	"You Don't Have To Know the Language" (with Bing Crosby)	21	–	–
1948	"Teresa" (with Dick Haymes)	21	–	–
1948	"Toolie Oolie Doolie (The Yodel Polka)"	3	–	–
1948	"I Hate to Lose You"	14	–	–
1948	"Heartbreaker"	21	–	–
1948	"Sabre Dance"	20	–	–
1948	"Woody Woodpecker" (with Danny Kaye)	18	–	–
1948	"Blue Tail Fly" (with Burl Ives)	24	–	–
1948	"Underneath the Arches"	5	–	–
1948	"You Call Everybody Darling"	8	–	–
1948	"Cuanto La Gusta" (with Carmen Miranda)	12	–	–
1948	"160 Acres" (with Bing Crosby)	23	–	–
1948	"Bella Bella Marie"	23	–	–
1949	"Christmas Island" (re-entry: see 1946)	26	–	–
1949	"The Pussy Cat Song (Nyow! Nyot! Nyow!)" (Patty Andrews and Bob Crosby)	12	–	–
1949	"More Beer!"	30	–	–
1949	"I'm Bitin' My Fingernails and Thinking of You" (with Ernest Tubb)	30	–	2
1949	"Don't Rob Another Man's Castle" (with Ernest Tubb)	–	–	6
1949	"I Can Dream, Can't I?"	1	–	–
1949	"The Wedding of Lili Marlene"	20	–	–
1949	"She Wore a Yellow Ribbon" (with Russ Morgan)	22	–	–
1949	"Charley, My Boy" (with Russ Morgan)	15	–	–
1950	"Merry Christmas Polka" (with Guy Lombardo)	18	–	–
1950	"Have I Told You Lately That I Love You" (with Bing Crosby)	24	–	–
1950	"Quicksilver" (with Bing Crosby)	6	–	–
1950	"The Wedding Samba" (with Carmen Miranda)	23	–	–
1950	"I Wanna Be Loved"	1	–	–
1950	"Can't We Talk It Over"	22	–	–
1950	"A Bushel and a Peck"	22	–	–
1950	"Mele Kalikimaka" (with Bing Crosby)	36	–	–
1951	"A Penny a Kiss, a Penny a Hug"	17	–	–
1951	"Sparrow in the Tree Top" (with Bing Crosby)	8	–	–
1951	"Too Young" (Patty Andrews)	19	–	–
1952	"Sing, Sing, Sing"	17	–	–
1955	"Suddenly There's a Valley" (Patty Andrews)	69	–	–

==== Other songs ====
Highest chart positions on Billboard; with Vic Schoen and his orchestra, unless otherwise noted:

- "A Bushel and a Peck" (1950) (No. 22)
- "A Hundred and Sixty Acres" (with Bing Crosby) (1948) (No. 23)
- "A Penny a Kiss-A Penny a Hug" (1950) (No. 17)
- "Aurora" (1941) (No. 10)
- "Bella Bella Marie" (1948) (No. 23)
- "Can't We Talk it Over?" (with Gordon Jenkins and his orchestra and chorus) (1950) (No. 22)
- "Charley, My Boy" (with Russ Morgan and his orchestra) (1949) (No. 15)
- "Chico's Love Song" (1939) (No. 11)
- "Christmas Island" (with Guy Lombardo and his Royal Canadians) (1946: No. 7; 1947: No. 20; 1949: No. 26)
- "Ciribiribin (They're So in Love)" (with Bing Crosby & Joe Venuti and his orchestra) (1939) (No. 13)
- "Coax Me a Little Bit" (1946) (No. 24)
- "Corns for My Country" (1945) (No. 21)
- "Cuanto La Gusta" (with Carmen Miranda) (1948) (No. 12)
- "Down By the O-HI-O" (1940) (No. 21)
- "Down in the Valley (Hear that Train Blow)" (1944) (No. 20)
- "East of the Rockies" (1943) (No. 18)
- "(Everytime They Play the) Sabre Dance" (with The Harmonica Gentlemen) (1948) (No. 20)
- "Heartbreaker" (with The Harmonica Gentlemen) (1948) (No. 21)
- "Here Comes the Navy" (1942) (No. 17)
- "Hit the Road" (1940) (No. 27)
- "How Lucky You Are" (1947) (No. 22)
- "I Don't Know Why (I Just Do)" (1946) (No. 17)
- "I Hate to Lose You" (1948) (No. 14)
- "Have I Told You Lately That I Love You?" (with Bing Crosby) (1950) (No. 24)
- "I'll Pray For You" (1942) (No. 22)
- "I'm Biting My Fingernails and Thinking of You" (with Ernest Tubb and The Texas Troubadors directed by Vic Schoen) (1949) (No. 30)
- "I Wish I Had a Dime (For Ev'rytime I Missed You)" (1941) (No. 20)
- "I Yi, Yi, Yi, Yi (I Like You Very Much)" (1941) (No. 11)
- "Jealous" (1941) (No. 12)
- "The Blue Tail Fly (Jimmy Crack Corn)" (with Burl Ives, vocal and guitar accompaniment) (1948) (No. 24)
- "Joseph! Joseph!" (1938) (No. 18)
- "Lullaby to a Jitterbug" (1938) (No. 10)
- "Merry Christmas Polka" (with Guy Lombardo and his Royal Canadians) (1950) (No. 18)
- "Mister Five By Five" (1942) (No. 14)
- "Money Is the Root of All Evil (Take it Away, Take it Away, Take it Away)" (with Guy Lombardo and his Royal Canadians) (1946) (No. 9)
- "More Beer!" (1949) (No. 30)
- "Oh Johnny, Oh Johnny, Oh!" Decca 2840 (1940)
- "On the Avenue" (with Carmen Cavallaro at the piano), Decca 24102 A (1947) (No. 21)
- "One Meat Ball" (1945) (No. 15)
- "Patience and Fortitude" (1946) (No. 12)
- "Pennsylvania Polka" (1942) (No. 17)
- "Pross Tchai (Goodbye-Goodbye)" (1939) (No. 15)
- "Put That Ring On My Finger" (1945)
- "Quicksilver" (with Bing Crosby) (1950) (No. 6)
- "Rhumboogie" (1940) (No. 11)
- "Get Your Kicks on Route 66" (with Bing Crosby) (1946) (No. 14)
- "Says My Heart" (1938) (No. 10)
- "Scrub Me Mama with a Boogie Beat" (1940) (No. 10)
- "Sha-Sha" (with Jimmy Dorsey and his orchestra) (1938) (No. 17)
- "She Wore a Yellow Ribbon" (with Russ Morgan and his orchestra) (1949) (No. 22)
- "Shortenin' Bread" (1938) (No. 16)
- "Sing a Tropical Song" (1944) (No. 24)
- "Sleepy Serenade" (1941) (No. 22)
- "Sleigh Ride" (1950)
- "Sonny Boy" (1941) (No. 22)
- "Sparrow in the Treetop" (with Bing Crosby) (1951) (No. 8)
- "Straighten Up and Fly Right" (1944) (No. 8)
- "Strip Polka" (1942) (No. 6)
- "Sweet Marie" (with Carmen Cavallaro at the piano), Decca 24102 B (maybe 1947?) (No. ?)
- "Tallahassee" (with Bing Crosby) (1947) (No. 10)
- "Teresa" (with Dick Haymes) (1948) (No. 21)
- "That's the Moon, My Son" (1942) (No. 18)
- "The Blond Sailor" (1945) (No. 8)
- "The Freedom Train" (1947) (No. 21)
- "The House of Blue Lights" (with Eddie Heywood and his orchestra) (1946) (No. 15)
- "The Lady from 29 Palms" (1947) (No. 7)
- "The Nickel Serenade" (1941) (No. 22)
- "The Pussy Cat Song (Nyow! Nyot Nyow!)" (Patty Andrews and Bob Crosby) (1949) (No. 12)
- "The Three Caballeros" (with Bing Crosby) (1945) (No. 8)
- "The Wedding of Lili Marlene" (with Gordon Jenkins and his orchestra and chorus) (1949) (No. 20)
- "The Wedding Samba" (with Carmen Miranda) (1950) (No. 23)
- "The Windmill Song" (with Gordon Jenkins and his orchestra) (1951) (No. ?)
- "The Woodpecker Song" (1940) (No. 6)
- "There's No Business Like Show Business" (with Bing Crosby and Dick Haymes) (1947) (No. 25)
- "Three Little Sisters" (1942) (No. 8)
- "Tico-Tico no Fubá" (1944) (No. 24)
- "Ti-Pi-Tin" (1938) (No. 12)
- "Too Young" (Patty Andrews with Victor Young and his orchestra) (1951) (No. 19)
- "Torero" Capitol F 3965 (recorded on March 31, 1958)
- "Tu-Li-Tulip Time" (with Jimmy Dorsey and his orchestra) (1938) (No. 9)
- "Winter Wonderland" (with Guy Lombardo and his Royal Canadians) (1946) (No. 22)
- "The Woody Woodpecker Song" (with Danny Kaye and The Harmonica Gentlemen) (1948) (No. 18)
- "You Call Everybody Darling" (recorded in London with Billy Ternant and his orchestra) (1948) (No. 8)
- "You Don't Have to Know the Language" (with Bing Crosby) (1948) (No. 21)
- "You Don't Know How Much You Can Suffer" (1939) (No. 14)
- "Your Red Wagon" (1947) (No. 24)

== Film, theatre, and television ==
(partial list)

=== Filmography ===
- Argentine Nights (Universal Pictures, 1940)
- Buck Privates (Universal Pictures, 1941)
- In the Navy (Universal Pictures, 1941)
- Hold That Ghost (Universal Pictures, 1941)
- What's Cookin'? (Universal Pictures, 1942)
- Private Buckaroo (Universal Pictures, 1942)
- Give Out, Sisters (Universal Pictures, 1942)
- How's About It (Universal Pictures, 1943)
- Always a Bridesmaid (Universal Pictures, 1943)
- Swingtime Johnny (Universal Pictures, 1944)
- Moonlight and Cactus (Universal Pictures, 1944)
- Follow the Boys (Universal Pictures, 1944)
- Hollywood Canteen (Warner Brothers, 1944)
- Her Lucky Night (Universal Pictures, 1945)
- Make Mine Music (Walt Disney Studios, 1946) – voices only, as singers of one segment
- Road to Rio (Paramount Pictures, 1947)
- Melody Time (Walt Disney Studios, 1948) – voices only, as singers of one segment
- Brother, Can You Spare a Dime? (1975) – newsreel archive footage only

=== Soundtracks ===
- Breach (background music) (2007)
- Land of the Lost (2009)
- Fallout 3 (2008) (Civilization)
- Fallout 4 (2015) (Civilization-Pistol Packin' Mama)
- Mafia II (2010) [Boogie Woogie Bugle Boy – Rum and Coca-Cola – Straighten Up And Fly Right – Strip Polka – Hot Time in the Town of Berlin (with Bing Crosby) – Victory Polka (with Bing Crosby)]
- Bioshock (2006)
- Fallout 76 (2018)

=== Broadway ===
- Over Here! (1974; Shubert Theater, New York City, 9 months)

=== Dance ===
- Company B (1991); Choreographed by Paul Taylor, Performed by Paul Taylor Dance Company, American Ballet Theatre, Miami City Ballet, The Sarasota Ballet, and Pacific Northwest Ballet.

=== Television ===
- Appearance on The Joey Bishop Show
- They were parodied on Sesame Street as the Androoze Sisters (Muppets), named Mayeeme (Audrey Smith), Pattiz (Maeretha Stewart), and Lavoorrnee (Kevin Clash).
- Patty Andrews appeared in season two, episode six, of Here's Lucy, entitled "Lucy And The Andrews Sisters", in which Lucy, Kim, and Craig help Patty recreate the Andrews Sisters with Bing Crosby for a one-night only performance at a convention of the Sisters' oldest fan club.

== See also ==
- List of best-selling music artists
