= 1960 in music =

This is a list of notable events in music that took place in the year 1960.

== Specific locations ==
- 1960 in British music
- 1960 in Japanese music
- 1960 in Norwegian music

== Specific genres ==
- 1960 in country music
- 1960 in jazz

== Events ==
- January – Art student Stuart Sutcliffe joins the Liverpool band Johnny and the Moondogs and suggests they change their name to the Beatals; after several variations this settles on The Beatles in August.
- January 14 – Elvis Presley is promoted to Sergeant in the United States Army.
- January 25 – The National Association of Broadcasters in the United States reacts to the payola scandal by threatening fines for any disc jockeys accepting money for playing particular records.
- February 6 – Songwriter Jesse Belvin dies in an automobile accident in Los Angeles; he is co-author of "Earth Angel", The Penguins' classic from 1954.
- February 23 – United States Army Old Guard Fife and Drum Corps formed.
- March 5 – Elvis Presley returns home from serving in the U.S. Army in Germany, having stopped off on March 2 at Glasgow Prestwick Airport, his only time in the U.K.
- March 15 – Jussi Björling suffers a heart attack before a performance at the Royal Opera House, Covent Garden, London. He goes on to perform, but dies six months later in Sweden.
- March 29 – The 5th Eurovision Song Contest, held at the Royal Festival Hall, London, is won by France with the song "Tom Pillibi", sung by Jacqueline Boyer.
- Spring – "Skokiaan" by Bill Haley & His Comets becomes the band's final single to make it onto the American sales charts (with the exception of a 1974 reissue of "Rock Around the Clock").
- April 1 – Frank Sinatra, Sammy Davis Jr., Elvis Presley, Dean Martin and Mitch Miller film Sinatra's Timex Special for ABC at Miami, Florida's Fountainbleu Hotel.
- April 2 – The National Association of Recording Merchandisers presents its first annual awards in Las Vegas, Nevada.
- April 4 – RCA Victor Records announces that it will release all pop singles in mono and stereo simultaneously, the first record company to do so. Elvis Presley's single "Stuck on You" is RCA's first mono/stereo release.
- April 17 – Eddie Cochran, Gene Vincent and Cochran's girlfriend Sharon Sheeley are injured in a car accident near Chippenham in England. Cochran dies in a hospital in Bath, Somerset, from severe brain injuries. Police officer David Harman, who attends the incident, starts learning to play the guitar using Cochran's impounded Gretsch, later becoming professional musician Dave Dee.
- April 20 – Elvis Presley returns to Hollywood for the first time since coming home from Germany to film G.I. Blues.
- May 2 – The Drifters' Ben E. King leaves the group and signs a solo record contract with ATCO Records.
- May 20–28 – The Beatles, as the Silver Beetles (uncredited), play their first ever tour, as a backing group for Johnny Gentle on a tour of Scotland. The lineup comprises John Lennon, Paul McCartney, George Harrison, Stuart Sutcliffe and Tommy Moore.
- June 30 – Opening of Lionel Bart's Oliver! in London's West End.
- July – The Shadows' instrumental Apache is released in the U.K.
- July 30 – "Battle of Beaulieu": At an English jazz festival at Beaulieu, Hampshire, fans of trad jazz come to blows with progressives.
- August 17 – The Beatles make their debut under this name in Hamburg, Germany, beginning a 48-night residency at the Indra club. The band at the time comprises John Lennon, Paul McCartney, George Harrison, Stu Sutcliffe on bass and Pete Best on drums.
- August 27 – Last radio broadcast of Louisiana Hayride.
- October – Dion DiMucci splits from Dion and The Belmonts.
- October 16 – A single concert at the Donaueschingen Festival premieres Penderecki's Anaklasis and Messiaen's Chronochromie.
- November 13 – Sammy Davis Jr. marries May Britt.
- December
  - Édith Piaf's recording of "Non, je ne regrette rien" is released in France.
  - Joseph Shabalala forms male vocal group Ezimnyama ("The Black Ones"), predecessor of Ladysmith Black Mambazo, in South Africa.
- The last 78 rpm records are released in the U.S. and the U.K.
- English rock musician Ritchie Blackmore's musical career begins.
- Renato Carosone announces his retirement, at the height of his popularity.
- Dalida and Charles Aznavour share the Grand Prix Award for best Italian song.
- Ian Lake launches the Music of our Time Festival in London for hitherto unknown composers.
- Indian santoor player Shivkumar Sharma records his first solo album.
- 14-year-old Neil Young founds a band called The Jades with Ken Koblun in Winnipeg.

== Albums released ==
- A Date with the Everly Brothers – The Everly Brothers
- A Portrait of Duke Ellington – Dizzy Gillespie
- At Last! – Etta James
- At Newport 1960 – Muddy Waters
- Around Midnight – Julie London
- Around the World with The Chipmunks - Alvin and the Chipmunks
- Bill Haley and His Comets – Bill Haley & His Comets
- Bing & Satchmo – Bing Crosby and Louis Armstrong
- Bo Diddley Is a Gunslinger – Bo Diddley
- Bobby Rydell/Chubby Checker - Bobby Rydell and Chubby Checker
- Bobby Vee Sings Your Favorites - Bobby Vee
- Broadway Playbill – The Hi-Lo's
- The Brothers Four – The Brothers Four
- Change of the Century – Ornette Coleman
- Ella in Berlin: Mack the Knife – Ella Fitzgerald
- Ella Fitzgerald Sings Songs from "Let No Man Write My Epitaph" – Ella Fitzgerald
- Ella Wishes You a Swinging Christmas – Ella Fitzgerald
- Elvis Is Back! – Elvis Presley
- Les enfants du Pirée – Dalida
- Everything Goes!!! – The Four Lads
- Fiorello! – Oscar Peterson
- For the Young at Heart – Perry Como
- For Twisters Only - Chubby Checker
- The Genius Hits the Road – Ray Charles
- G.I. Blues – Elvis Presley
- Giant Steps – John Coltrane
- Haley's Juke Box – Bill Haley & His Comets
- Have Guitar Will Travel – Bo Diddley
- Hello, Love – Ella Fitzgerald
- His Hand in Mine – Elvis Presley
- I Gotta Right to Swing – Sammy Davis Jr.
- It's Everly Time – The Everly Brothers
- Jo + Jazz – Jo Stafford
- Joan Baez – Joan Baez
- Julie...At Home – Julie London
- Just a Closer Walk with Thee – Patti Page
- The Last Month of the Year – The Kingston Trio
- Me and My Shadows – Cliff Richard & The Shadows
- More Italian Favorites - Connie Francis
- More Songs by Ricky – Ricky Nelson
- Nice 'n' Easy – Frank Sinatra
- No Cover, No Minimum – Billy Eckstine
- Now, There Was a Song! – Johnny Cash
- On the Swingin' Side – Vic Damone
- Once More with Feeling – Billy Eckstine
- Pietro Deiro Presents the Accordion Orchestra – Joe Biviano, Carmen Carrozza, John Serry
- Portrait in Jazz – Bill Evans Trio
- Pre Bird – Charles Mingus
- Ride This Train – Johnny Cash
- Rockin' at the Hops – Chuck Berry
- Show Time – Doris Day
- Sketches of Spain – Miles Davis
- Sing Again with The Chipmunks - Alvin and the Chipmunks
- Sings Hank Williams – Johnny Cash
- Sold Out – The Kingston Trio
- String Along – The Kingston Trio
- Swingin' on the Moon – Mel Tormé
- Twist with Chubby Checker - Chubby Checker
- The Two of Us – Brook Benton and Dinah Washington
- This Is...Brenda – Brenda Lee
- The Village of St. Bernadette – Andy Williams
- We Insist! – Max Roach
- What Every Girl Should Know – Doris Day

== Biggest hit singles ==
The following singles achieved the highest chart positions in 1960.

#	Artist	Title	Year	Country	Chart entries
1	Elvis Presley	It's Now Or Never	1960	US	UK 1 – Feb 2005, US BB 1 – Jul 1960, Canada 1 – Jul 1960, Norway 1 – Sep 1960, Australia 1 of 1960, Australia 1 for 7 weeks Feb 1960, South Africa 1 of 1960, US CashBox 2 of 1960, Germany 2 – Jan 1961, RYM 2 of 1960, US BB 9 of 1960, POP 9 of 1960, Italy 17 of 1960, DDD 19 of 1960, Germany 35 of the 1960s
2	Elvis Presley	Are You Lonesome Tonight?	1960	US	UK 1 – Jan 1961, US BB 1 – Nov 1960, Canada 1 – Nov 1960, Australia 1 for 8 weeks May 1960, US BB 3 of 1960, Sweden (alt) 3 – Nov 1980, Norway 3 – Jan 1961, POP 3 of 1960, Germany 4 – Feb 1961, RYM 4 of 1960, US CashBox 6 of 1961, Australia 9 of 1960, South Africa 12 of 1960, Netherlands 15 – Jan 1981, Italy 28 of 1961, DDD 29 of 1960, Global 33 (5 M sold) – 1960, Scrobulate 79 of rock & roll, Germany 215 of the 1960s
3	Chubby Checker	The Twist	1960	US	US BB 1 – Aug 1960, US BB 1 of 1960, US CashBox 1 of 1962, Canada 1 – Aug 1960, POP 1 of 1960, UK 5 – Nov 1975, South Africa 7 of 1961, DDD 9 of 1960, RYM 12 of 1960, RIAA 32, Italy 38 of 1962, Party 46 of 2007, Acclaimed 140, Germany 396 of the 1960s, Rolling Stone 451
4	The Drifters	Save the Last Dance for Me	1960	US	US BB 1 – Sep 1960, Canada 1 – Sep 1960, Australia 1 for 3 weeks Apr 1960, UK 2 – Nov 1960, US CashBox 3 of 1960, Norway 3 – Dec 1960, South Africa 9 of 1960, RYM 9 of 1960, DDD 12 of 1960, Australia 13 of 1960, US BB 20 of 1960, POP 20 of 1960, Germany 46 of the 1960s, Rolling Stone 182, Acclaimed 512
5	Johnny Preston	Running Bear	1960	US	UK 1 – Feb 1960, US BB 1 – Dec 1959, Canada 1 – Dec 1959, Australia 1 for 2 weeks Jul 1959, Norway 2 – Mar 1960, South Africa 3 of 1960, US CashBox 10 of 1960, Australia 16 of 1960, US BB 39 of 1960, POP 39 of 1960, DDD 54 of 1959, RYM 73 of 1959

== Top hits on record ==
- "Alley Oop" – The Hollywood Argyles
- "Angel On My Shoulder" – Shelby Flint
- "Apache" – The Shadows
- "Are You Lonesome Tonight?" – Elvis Presley
- "A Rockin' Good Way (to Mess Around and Fall in Love)" – Brook Benton and Dinah Washington
- "As Long as He Needs Me" – Shirley Bassey
- "Because They're Young" – Duane Eddy
- "Beyond the Sea" – Bobby Darin
- "Burning Bridges" – Jack Scott
- "But Not For Me" – Ella Fitzgerald
- "Calcutta" – Lawrence Welk
- "Cathy's Clown" – The Everly Brothers
- "Chain Gang" – Sam Cooke
- "Cherry Pie" – Skip & Flip
- "Corinna, Corinna" – Ray Peterson
- "Cradle of Love" – Johnny Preston
- "Dance with Me" – The Drifters
- "Donald Where's Your Troosers?" – Andy Stewart
- "Dreamin'" – Johnny Burnette
- "El Paso" – Marty Robbins
- "Everybody's Somebody's Fool" – Connie Francis
- "Exodus" – Ferrante & Teicher
- "Fall in Love with You" – Cliff Richard and The Shadows
- "Feel So Fine" – Johnny Preston
- "Finger Poppin' Time" – Hank Ballard & The Midnighters
- "Georgia on My Mind" – Ray Charles
- "Go, Jimmy, Go" – Jimmy Clanton
- "Good Timin'" – Jimmy Jones
- "Greenfields" – The Brothers Four
- "He'll Have to Stay" – Jeanne Black
- "I Count the Tears" - The Drifters
- "Image of a Girl"
  - The Safaris
  - Mark Wynter
- "I'm Sorry" – Brenda Lee
- "Itsi Bitsi Petit Bikini" – Dalida
- "It's Now or Never" – Elvis Presley
- "Itsy Bitsy Teenie Weenie Yellow Polkadot Bikini" – Brian Hyland
- "I Love the Way You Love" – Marv Johnson
- "I Love You" – Cliff Richard and The Shadows
- "I Want to Be Wanted" – Brenda Lee
- "Jealous of You (Tango della Gelosia) - Connie Francis
- "Kommotion" – Duane Eddy
- "Kookie Little Paradise" – Jo Ann Campbell
- "L'Arlequin de Tolède" – Dalida
- "Les Enfants du Pirée" – Dalida
- "Let the Little Girl Dance" – Billy Bland
- "Lonely Blue Boy" – Conway Twitty
- "Lonely Teenager" – Dion
- "Lonely Winds" - The Drifters
- "Look for a Star"
  - Garry Mills
  - Billy Vaughn and His Orchestra
- "Love You So" – Ron Holden
- "Mama" – Connie Francis
- "Man of Mystery"/"The Stranger" – The Shadows
- "Many Tears Ago" – Connie Francis
- "Mission Bell" – Donnie Brooks
- "Mule Skinner Blues" – The Fendermen
- "My Heart Has a Mind of Its Own" – Connie Francis
- "My Home Town" – Paul Anka
- "My Little Corner of the World" – Anita Bryant
- "New Orleans" – Gary U.S. Bonds
- "Nine Times Out of Ten" – Cliff Richard and The Shadows
- "North To Alaska" – Johnny Horton
- "Only the Lonely" – Roy Orbison
- "Ooh Poo Pah Doo" – Jessie Hill
- "'O sole mio" – Dalida
- "Over You" – Aaron Neville
- "Paper Roses" – Anita Bryant
- "Please Don't Tease" – Cliff Richard and The Shadows
- "Mr. Custer" – Larry Verne
- "Question" – Lloyd Price
- "Robot Man" – Connie Francis
- "Romantica" – Dalida
- "Rubber Ball" – Bobby Vee
- "Running Bear" – Johnny Preston
- "Sandy" – Larry Hall
- "Save the Last Dance for Me" – The Drifters
- "A Scottish Soldier" – Andy Stewart
- "Shazam!" – Duane Eddy
- "She's My Baby" – Johnny O'Keefe
- "Shop Around" – The Miracles
- "Sink the Bismark" – Johnny Horton
- "Sixteen Reasons" – Connie Stevens
- "Sleep" – Little Willie John
- "Starry Eyed" – Michael Holliday
- "Stay" – Maurice Williams and the Zodiacs
- "T'aimer follement" – Dalida
- "Tall Oak Tree" – Dorsey Burnette
- "Teen Angel" – Mark Dinning
- "Tell Laura I Love Her"
  - Ray Peterson
  - Ricky Valance
- "That's All You Gotta Do" – Brenda Lee
- "Theme from The Apartment" – Ferrante & Teicher
- "A Thousand Stars" – Kathy Young with the Innocents
- "Today I Sing the Blues" – Aretha Franklin
- "Today's Teardrops" – Roy Orbison, written by Gene Pitney
- "True Love Ways" – Buddy Holly
- "The Twist" – Chubby Checker
- "Walk, Don't Run" – The Ventures
- "Walking to New Orleans" – Fats Domino
- "Way Down Yonder in New Orleans" – Freddy Cannon
- "What in the World's Come Over You" – Jack Scott
- "Where or When" – Dion and the Belmonts
- "Why" – Frankie Avalon
- "Wild One" – Bobby Rydell
- "Young Emotions" – Ricky Nelson
- "You're Sixteen" – Johnny Burnette
- "You Talk Too Much" – Joe Jones

== Published popular music ==
- "Ain't That a Kick in the Head?" – words: Sammy Cahn, music: Jimmy Van Heusen
- "Alley-Oop" – words and music: Dallas Frazier
- "Apache" – m. Jerry Lordan
- "As Long as He Needs Me" – w.m. Lionel Bart from the musical Oliver!
- "Bonanza!" – w.m. Jay Livingston & Ray Evans
- "Calcutta" – w. Lee Pockriss & Paul Vance m. Heino Gaze
- "Calendar Girl" – w. Howard Greenfield m. Neil Sedaka
- "Camelot" – w. Alan Jay Lerner m. Frederick Loewe. Introduced by Richard Burton in the musical of the same name
- "Cathy's Clown" – w.m. The Everly Brothers
- "Chain Gang" – w.m. Sam Cooke
- "Everybody's Somebody's Fool" – w. Howard Greenfield m. Jack Keller
- "Good Timin'" – w.m. Fred Tobias & Clint Ballard Jr.
- "Goodness Gracious Me" – D. Lee, H. Kretzmer
- "He Will Break Your Heart" – w.m. Jerry Butler, Calvin Carter & Curtis Mayfield
- "Hey, Look Me Over" – w. Carolyn Leigh m. Cy Coleman. Introduced by Lucille Ball in the musical Wildcat
- "I Gotta Know" – w.m. Paul Evans & Matt Williams
- "I Want to Be Wanted" – w. (Eng) Kim Gannon (Ital) A. Testa m. Pino Spotti
- "I'd Do Anything" – w.m. Lionel Bart
- "I'll Be There" – w.m. Bobby Darin
- "I'm Sorry" – w.m. Ronnie Self & Dub Allbritten
- "If Ever I Would Leave You" – w. Alan Jay Lerner m. Frederick Loewe. Introduced by Robert Goulet in the musical Camelot
- "Irma La Douce" – w. (Eng) Julian More, David Heneker & Monty Norman (Fr) Alexandre Breffort m. Marguerite Monnot
- "It's Now or Never" – w.m. adapt. Aaron Schroeder & Wally Gold
- "Itsy Bitsy Teenie Weenie Yellow Polkadot Bikini" – w. Paul Vance & Lee Pockriss m. Brian Hyland
- "Last Date" – m. Floyd Cramer
- "Little Boy Lost" – w.m. Johnny Ashcroft & Tony Withers
- "A Million to One" – w.m. Phil Medley
- "Mister Custer" – w.m. Fred Darian, Al De Lory & Joseph Van Winkle
- "Money (That's What I Want)" – w.m. Janie Bradford & Berry Gordy Jr.
- "Mountain of Love" – w.m. Harold Dorman
- "My Heart Has a Mind of Its Own" – w. Howard Greenfield m. Jack Keller
- "Never on Sunday" – w. (Eng) Billy Towne (Greek) Manos Hadjidakis m. Manos Hadjidakis
- "North to Alaska" – w.m. Mike Phillips
- "Only the Lonely" – w.m. Roy Orbison & Joe Melson
- "Please Don't Tease" – B. Welch, P. Chester
- "Please Help Me, I'm Falling" – w.m. Don Robertson & Hal Blair
- "Poetry in Motion" – w.m. Paul Kauffman & Mike Anthony
- "Puppy Love" – w.m. Paul Anka
- "Rubber Ball" – w.m. Anne Orlowski & Aaron Schroeder
- "Run Samson Run" – w. Howard Greenfield m. Neil Sedaka
- "Sailor" – w. (Eng) Alan Holt (Ger) Fini Busch m. Werner Scharfenberger
- "Save the Last Dance for Me" – w.m. Doc Pomus & Mort Shuman
- "The Second Time Around" – w. Sammy Cahn m. Jimmy Van Heusen. Introduced by Bing Crosby in the film High Time.
- "She Wears My Ring" – w.m. Felice and Boudleaux Bryant
- "Sink the Bismark" – w.m. Tillman Franks & Johnny Horton
- "Sixteen Reasons" – w.m. Bill Post & Doree Post
- "Soon It's Gonna Rain" – w. Tom Jones m. Harvey Schmidt
- "Spanish Harlem" – Jerry Leiber, Phil Spector
- "Stairway to Heaven" – w. Howard Greenfield m. Neil Sedaka
- "Stay" – w.m. Maurice Williams
- "Stuck on You" – w.m. Aaron Schroeder & J. Leslie McFarland
- "A Taste of Honey" – w. Ric Marlow m. Bobby Scott
- "Tell Laura I Love Her" – w.m. Jeff Barry & Ben Raleigh
- "Theme from A Summer Place" – m. Max Steiner
- "Tie Me Kangaroo Down, Sport" – w.m. Rolf Harris
- "Try to Remember" – w. Tom Jones m. Harvey Schmidt
- "The Twist" – w.m. Hank Ballard
- "Walk, Don't Run" – w.m. Johnny Smith
- "Walking to New Orleans" – w.m. Bobby Charles
- "When Will I Be Loved" – w.m. Phil Everly
- "Wild One" – w.m. Bernie Lowe, Kal Mann & Dave Appell
- "Will You Love Me Tomorrow" – Carole King, Gerry Goffin
- "Wings of a Dove" – Robert B. "Bob" Ferguson, Sr.
- "Wooden Heart" – w.m. adapt. Fred Wise, Ben Weisman, Kay Twomey & Bert Kaempfert
- "(In The Summertime) You Don't Want My Love" – w.m. Roger Miller
- "You Talk Too Much" – w.m. Joe Jones & Reginald Hall
- "You're Sixteen" – w.m. Richard M. Sherman & Robert B. Sherman

== Other notable songs ==
- "Al Watan Al Akbar" – w.m. Mohammed Abdel Wahab
- "Dance of the Yi People" (instrumental) by Wang Huiran
- "Et maintenant" – w. Pierre Delanoë m. Gilbert Bécaud
- "Nous les amoureux" – w. Maurice Vidalin m. Jacques Datin
- "Pyar Kiya To Darna Kiya" – w.m. Naushad Ali
- "Saba you rise from the ocean" – w.m. Christina Maria Jeurissen
- "Uno dei tanti" (I Who Have Nothing) – w. Mogol m. Carlo Donida Labati
- "La Vache à mille francs" – w.m. Jean Poiret

== Classical music ==
=== Premieres ===
Sortable table
Composer	Composition	Date	Location	Performers
Arnold, Malcolm	Symphony No. 4	1960-11-02	London	BBC Symphony – Arnold
Barraqué, Jean	... Au delà du hasard	1960-01-26	Théâtre de l'Odéon, Paris	Loriod, Semser, Cahn, Codinas, Rostaing, Jazz Groupe de Paris (dir. Hodeir), Domaine Musical – Boulez
Berio, Luciano	Circles	1960-08-01	Lenox, Massachusetts (Berkshire Festival)	Berberian / members of the Boston Symphony
Berio, Luciano	Momenti	1960-12-01	Hamburg	(electronic sounds on tape)
Carter, Elliott	String Quartet No. 2	1960-03-25	New York City	Juilliard Quartet
Cowell, Henry	Symphony No. 12	1960-03-28	Houston	Houston Symphony – Stokowski
Farquhar, David	Symphony No. 1	1960-08-13	Wellington	New Zealand Symphony Orchestra – John Hopkins
Foss, Lukas	Concerto for Improvising Solo Instruments and Orchestra	1960-07-10	Philadelphia	Lukas Foss Ensemble / Philadelphia Orchestra – Ormandy
Foss, Lukas	Time Cycle	1960-10-20	New York City	Addison, Lukas Foss Ensemble / New York Philharmonic – Bernstein
Ligeti, György	Apparitions	1960-06-19	Cologne (ISCM Festival)	NDR Symphony – Bour
Messiaen, Olivier	Chronochromie	1960-10-16	Donaueschingen (Musiktage)	SWF Symphony – Rosbaud
Penderecki, Krzysztof	Anaklasis	1960-10-16	Donaueschingen (Musiktage)	SWF Symphony – Rosbaud
Shostakovich, Dmitri	String Quartet No. 7	1960-05-15	Leningrad	Beethoven Quartet
Shostakovich, Dmitri	String Quartet No. 8	1960-10-02	Leningrad	Beethoven Quartet
Stockhausen, Karlheinz	Carré for four orchestras and four choirs	1960-10-28	Hamburg (Planten un Blomen)	NDR Symphony Orchestra and Choir – Gielen, Kagel, Markowski, Stockhausen.
Stockhausen, Karlheinz	Kontakte for piano, percussion, and electronic sounds	1960-06-11	Cologne (ISCM Festival)	Tudor, Christoph Caskel, four-channel electronic music.
Stravinsky, Igor	Movements for Piano and Orchestra	1960-01-10	New York City	Weber / (unknown orchestra) – Stravinsky
Walton, William	Symphony No.2	1960-11-19	Edinburgh (Festival)	Royal Liverpool Philharmonic – Pritchard
Weinberg, Mieczysław	Sinfonietta No. 2	1960-11-19	Moscow	Moscow Chamber Orchestra – Barshai

=== Compositions ===
- William Alwyn – Piano Concerto No. 2
- Malcolm Arnold – Symphony No. 4
- Henk Badings – Symphonic Variations
- Luciano Berio
  - Circles for female voice, harp and two percussionists
  - Momenti for tape
- Benjamin Britten – Cello Sonata in C major
- Elliott Carter – String Quartet No. 2
- Mario Davidovsky – Contrastes No. 1 for string orchestra and electronic sounds
- Lukas Foss
  - Concerto, for five improvising instruments
  - Time Cycle, for soprano and orchestra
- Alberto Ginastera – Cantata para América Mágica
- Sofia Gubaidulina – Serenade for solo guitar
- Bernard Herrmann – Psycho (film score)
- Wojciech Kilar – Herbsttag for female voice and string quartet
- Olivier Messiaen – Chronochromie
- Krzysztof Penderecki
  - Anaklasis for 42 string instruments and percussion
  - Threnody for the Victims of Hiroshima
- Walter Piston – Symphony No. 7
- Francis Poulenc – Gloria (written)
- Dmitri Shostakovich –
  - String Quartet No. 7 in E flat major, Op.108
  - String Quartet No. 8 in C minor, Op.110
- Fela Sowande – Folk Symphony for full orchestra
- Karlheinz Stockhausen
  - Carré, for 4 orchestras and choirs
  - Kontakte, for piano, percussion and electronic sounds, or electronic sounds alone
- Igor Stravinsky – Movements, for piano and orchestra
- Virgil Thomson – Missa Pro Defunctis
- William Walton – Symphony No. 2
- Mieczysław Weinberg – Sinfonietta No. 2
- La Monte Young – Compositions 1960

== Opera ==
- Henk Badings – Martin Korda
- Benjamin Britten – A Midsummer Night's Dream (premiered on June 11 at the Aldeburgh Festival; the rôle of Oberon is sung by the countertenor Alfred Deller for whom it is written)
- Du Mingxin – Women Generals of the Yangs
- Lukas Foss – Introductions and Goodbyes (a nine-minute opera, libretto by Gian Carlo Menotti, composed 1959, premiered on May 5, 1960)
- Hans Werner Henze – Der Prinz von Homburg (composed 1958, premiered on May 22, 1960)

== Film ==
- Elmer Bernstein - The Magnificent Seven
- Georges Delerue - Shoot the Piano Player
- Russell Garcia - The Time Machine
- Ernest Gold - Exodus
- Manos Hadjidakis - Never on Sunday
- Bernard Herrmann - Psycho
- Bernard Herrmann - The Three Worlds of Gulliver
- Alex North - Spartacus
- André Previn - Elmer Gantry
- Nino Rota - La dolce vita
- Dimitri Tiomkin - The Alamo

== Musical theater ==
- Beg, Borrow or Steal (Bud Freeman) and (Leon Pober) – Broadway production opened at the Martin Beck Theatre on February 10 and ran for 5 performances.
- Bye Bye Birdie (Lee Adams and Charles Strouse) – Broadway production opened at the Martin Beck Theatre on April 14 and ran for 607 performances
- Camelot (Alan Jay Lerner and Frederick Loewe) – Broadway production opened at the Majestic Theatre on December 3 and ran for 873 performances
- Christine – Broadway production opened at the 46th Street Theatre on April 28 and ran for 12 performances
- Do Re Mi – Broadway production opened at the St. James Theatre on December 26 and ran for 400 performances
- The Fantasticks – Off-Broadway production opened at the Sullivan Street Playhouse on May 3 and runs for 17,162 performances (42 years)
- Flower Drum Song (Rodgers & Hammerstein) – London production opened at the Palace Theatre on March 24 and ran for 464 performances
- From A to Z – Broadway revue opened at the Plymouth Theatre on April 20 and ran for 21 performances
- Greenwillow – Broadway production opened at the Alvin Theatre on March 8 and ran for 97 performances
- Hooray for Daisy – London production opened at the Lyric, Hammersmith on December 20. Starring Eleanor Drew and Robin Hunter.
- Irma La Douce – Broadway production opened at the Plymouth Theatre on September 29 and ran for 524 performances
- Oh, Kay! – Off-Broadway revival opened at the East 74th Street Theater on April 16 and ran for 119 performances. Starring Linda Lavin, Penny Fuller, and Marti Stevens, and with high school student Daniel Lewis working a follow spot in the lighting.
- Oliver! (Lionel Bart) – London production opened at the New Theatre on June 30 and ran for 2618 performances
- Parade – Broadway revue opened at the Players' Theatre on January 20 and ran for 95 performances
- Tenderloin – Broadway production opened at the 46th Street Theatre on October 17 and ran for 216 performances.
- The Unsinkable Molly Brown (Meredith Willson) – Broadway production opened at the Winter Garden Theatre on November 3 and ran for 532 performances
- Valmouth – Off-Broadway production opened at the York Playhouse on October 6 and ran for 14 performances
- Wildcat – Broadway production opened at the Alvin Theater on December 16 and ran for 171 performances

== Musical films ==
- Barsaat Ki Raat Bollywood films starring Madhubala
- Bells Are Ringing (Vincente Minnelli)starring Judy Holliday, Dean Martin and Eddie Foy Jr.
- Can-Can (Walter Lang) starring Frank Sinatra, Shirley MacLaine, Maurice Chevalier, Louis Jourdan and Juliet Prowse
- Cinderfella (Frank Tashlin) starring Jerry Lewis
- G.I. Blues (Norman Taurog) starring Elvis Presley and Juliet Prowse
- High Time (Blake Edwards) starring Bing Crosby, Fabian Forte, Tuesday Weld and Yvonne Craig.
- Let's Make Love (George Cukor) starring Marilyn Monroe, Yves Montand and Frankie Vaughan

== Births ==
- January 3 – Mikuláš Škuta, pianist and composer
- January 4
  - Art Paul Schlosser, singer-songwriter
  - Michael Stipe, lead singer for the rock band R.E.M.
- January 8 – Dave Weckl, jazz fusion drummer
- January 20
  - Scott Thunes, bass player (Frank Zappa band)
  - Jeff "Tain" Watts, jazz drummer
- January 22 – Michael Hutchence, Australian vocalist, songwriter and actor for INXS (d. 1997)
- January 26 – Charlie Gillingham (Counting Crows)
- January 29 – Cho-Liang Lin, Taiwanese-American violinist
- January 31 – George Benjamin, composer
- February 3 – Tim Chandler (Daniel Amos, The Swirling Eddies)
- February 4 – Tim Booth, British rock singer (James)
- February 7 – Steve Bronski, born Steve Forrest, synth-pop keyboardist (d. 2021)
- February 9 – Holly Johnson, singer (Frankie Goes to Hollywood)
- February 18 – Gazebo, singer
- February 20 – Kee Marcello, Swedish rock guitarist (Easy Action, Europe)
- February 27 – Paul Humphreys (Orchestral Manoeuvres in the Dark)
- March 4 – Thierry Pastor, French singer
- March 11 – Tommy Nilsson, Swedish singer and songwriter
- March 12 – Maki Nomiya, Japanese singer (Pizzicato Five)
- March 13 – Adam Clayton, bassist of rock band U2
- March 24 - Nena, German singer-songwriter
- April 4
  - Jane Eaglen, Wagnerian soprano
  - Maribelle, Dutch singer
- April 10 – Fabio Golfetti, Brazilian musician and record producer (Violeta de Outono, Gong)
- April 21 – John Maher, drummer for Buzzcocks, Flag of Convenience, The Invisible Girls
- April 23
  - Steve Clark, English guitarist (Def Leppard) (d. 1991)
  - David Gedge, English musician (The Wedding Present and Cinerama)
- April 26 – Roger Taylor, English rock musician (Duran Duran)
- May 6 – John Flansburgh, American rock musician (They Might Be Giants)
- May 8 – Eric Brittingham, American bass player (Cinderella and Naked Beggars)
- May 10
  - Bono, lead singer of U2
  - Kimmo Nevonmaa, Finnish contemporary music composer (d. 1996)
- May 18 - Page Hamilton, American guitarist, singer and songwriter (Helmet)
- May 19 – Yazz, British singer
- May 27 – Alexander Bashlachev, Russian singer (d. 1988)
- June 1 – Simon Gallup, bassist of The Cure
- June 2 – Tony Hadley, vocalist of Spandau Ballet
- June 6 – Steve Vai, American guitarist (David Lee Roth)
- June 8
  - Mick Hucknall, English vocalist of Simply Red
  - Terje Gewelt, Norwegian bassist
- June 10
  - Mark-Anthony Turnage, composer
  - Thea Austin, American singer-songwriter (Snap!)
- June 14 – Gary Husband, drummer, pianist and composer
- June 20 – John Taylor, bassist of Duran Duran
- June 22 – Alexander Shchetynsky, composer
- June 24 – Siedah Garrett, American singer-songwriter and pianist (Brand New Heavies)
- June 26 – Zachary Breaux, American jazz guitarist (d. 1997)
- July 3 – Vince Clarke, English rock songwriter (Depeche Mode, Yazoo, Erasure)
- July 11
  - Askar Abdrazakov, Russian operatic bass
  - David Baerwald, American singer-songwriter (David & David)
- July 13 – Anthony Doughty, English rock musician (Transvision Vamp)
- July 14 – Kyle Gass, American music singer-songwriter-guitarist/actor
- July 19 – Kevin Haskins, English drummer (Bauhaus, Love and Rockets)
- July 22
  - John Prior, Australian composer-producer-drummer (Matt Finish)
  - Jon Oliva, American vocalist and pianist (Savatage)
- July 23 – Billy Rutherford, Scottish singer-songwriter, musician and record producer (Riders of the Dark)
- August 1 – Chuck D (Public Enemy)
- August 2
  - Neal Morse, American singer and keyboard player (Spock's Beard, Transatlantic, Yellow Matter Custard, and Flying Colors)
  - David Yow, American singer-songwriter (Scratch Acid, The Jesus Lizard, and Qui)
- August 4 – Graham Massey, English record producer, keyboardist and remixer (808 State)
- August 7 – Jacquie O'Sullivan, Bananarama
- August 15 – Karlheinz Essl Jr., Austrian composer, performer, sound artist, improviser, and composition teacher
- August 16
  - Chris Pedersen, American drummer (Camper Van Beethoven, Monks of Doom)
  - Flood, British music producer and engineer
- August 17 – Johnny Wright (music manager), American music manager and a president/CEO of the Wright Entertainment Group (WEG).
- August 23 – Chris Potter, Canadian actor and musician
- August 26 – Branford Marsalis, American saxophonist and composer
- August 30 – Chalino Sánchez, Mexican musician (d. 1992)
- August 31 – Chris Whitley, singer-songwriter (d. 2005)
- September 1 – Joseph Williams, singer and film composer
- September 2 – Ruth Jacott, Dutch singer
- September 4 – Kim Thayil, Soundgarden
- September 5 – Karita Mattila, operatic soprano
- September 8
  - David Steele, Fine Young Cannibals
  - Aimee Mann, American songer-songwriter ('Til Tuesday)
- September 9 – Stefano Righi, Italian singer-songwriter, musician and composer. Righeira
- September 10 – David Lowery, American songer-songwriter (Cracker, Camper Van Beethoven)
- September 15 - Mitch Dorge, Canadian drummer (Crash Test Dummies)
- September 24 – Amy Sky, Canadian singer-songwriter, record producer, theatre actress, and television host.
- September 28 - Jennifer Rush, American singer-songwriter
- September 29
  - Alan McGee, British music industry mogul and musician
  - Nayah, French singer
- October 7 – Kyosuke Himuro, Japanese singer (Boøwy)
- October 13 – Joey Belladonna, born Joseph Bellardini, American thrash metal vocalist (Anthrax)
- October 16 - Bob Mould, American singer/songwriter (Hüsker Dü)
- October 19 – Dan Woodgate, English drummer Madness
- October 22
  - Cris Kirkwood, Meat Puppets
  - Darryl Jenifer, American bassist (Bad Brains, The White Mandingos)
- November 9
  - Joëlle Ursull, French singer
  - Demetra Plakas, American Drummer (L7)
- November 12 – Ismo Alanko, Finnish singer-songwriter (Hassisen Kone, Sielun Veljet, and Ismo Alanko Säätiö)
- November 14 – Tom Judson, American musical theatre actor
- November 15 – Keith Washington, American singer
- November 17 – RuPaul, American singer
- November 18 – Kim Wilde, English pop singer, author, DJ, television presenter and gardener (daughter of Marty Wilde)
- November 19 – Matt Sorum, American drummer (Guns N' Roses, Velvet Revolver, The Cult)
- November 25 – Amy Grant, American Christian singer-songwriter and actress
- November 27 – Vlado Janevski, Macedonian singer
- December 2
  - Rick Savage (Def Leppard)
  - L.V., American singer
- December 3 – Rolf Ellmer, German DJ (Jam & Spoon)
- December 5 – Osvaldo Golijov, composer
- December 22
  - Mark Brydon, English musician (Moloko)
  - Anita, Austrian singer
- December 27 – Fred Hammond, American gospel singer, bass guitar player, and record producer
- date unknown
  - Phil Cunningham, folk musician
  - Greg Flesch (Daniel Amos, The Swirling Eddies)
  - Diane Meredith Belcher, American concert organist, teacher and church musician
  - Priti Paintal, East Indian composer, performer, music producer and promoter

== Deaths ==
- January 2 – Leila Megane, mezzo-soprano, 68
- January 5 – Jakob van Domselaer, composer, 69
- January 18 – Gladys Bentley, blues singer, 52 (pneumonia)
- January 24 – Edwin Fischer, pianist and conductor, 73
- January 25 – Rutland Boughton, composer, 82
- February 2 – Jenő Huszka, composer of operettas, 84
- February 3
  - Ace Brigode, bandleader, 67
  - Fred Buscaglione, Italian singer, musician and songwriter, 38 (car accident)
- February 6 – Jesse Belvin, singer, pianist and songwriter, 27 (car accident)
- February 9 – Ernő Dohnányi, pianist, conductor and composer, 82
- February 12 – Bobby Clark, US comedian and singer, 71
- February 29 – Ottilie Collin, Austrian soprano, 96
- March 4 – Leonard Warren, baritone, operatic baritone (cerebral hemorrhage)
- March 16 – Billy Garland, blues guitarist, singer and songwriter, 41 (car accident)
- March 30 – Fabian Andre, composer, 50
- April 10 – Arthur Benjamin, composer, 66
- April 17 – Eddie Cochran, rock & roll singer, 21 (road accident)
- April 24 – Carl Braun, operatic bass, 73
- May 8 – Hugo Alfvén, violinist, conductor and composer, 88
- May 12 – Cecil Armstrong Gibbs, composer, 70
- May 13 – Gid Tanner, country music star, 74
- May 14 – Lucrezia Bori, operatic soprano, 72
- July 18 – Foster Reynolds, instrument manufacturer, 75 (heart attack at work)
- July 24
  - Hans Albers, actor and singer, 69
  - Louise Gunning, singer, Broadway and vaudeville, 81
- August 9 – Louis Cahuzac, clarinetist and composer, 80
- August 23 – Oscar Hammerstein II, librettist and director of many musicals, 65
- September 1 – Aunt Molly Jackson, folk singer and union activist, c. 80
- September 3 – Joseph Lamb, ragtime composer, 72
- September 5 – Oliphant Chuckerbutty, organist and composer, 75
- September 8 – Oscar Pettiford, American jazz musician and composer, 37
- September 9 – Jussi Björling, operatic tenor, 49 (heart attack)
- September 13 – Leo Weiner, music teacher, 75
- September 24 – Mátyás Seiber, composer, 55 (car accident)
- October 19 – Günter Raphael, composer, 57
- October 20 – Denise Orme, music hall performer, 75
- October 30 – Alfred Hill, composer and conductor, 90
- November 2 – Dimitris Mitropoulos, pianist, conductor and composer, 64
- November 5 – Johnny Horton, American country singer, 35 (car accident)
- December 4 – Walter Goehr, composer, 57
- December 7 – Clara Haskil, pianist, 65
- December 10 – Mado Robin, singer, 41 (cancer)
- Date unknown
  - Lawrence Duhé (b. 1887), jazz musician
  - Lorenzo Herrera (b. 1896), singer and composer
  - Jacobo Rubalcaba (b. 1895), musician and bandleader

== Awards ==
=== Grammy Awards ===
- Record of the Year: "Theme From A Summer Place" – Percy Faith
- Album of the Year: The Button-Down Mind of Bob Newhart – Bob Newhart
- Song of the Year: – "Theme From Exodus" – Ernest Gold, songwriter

=== Eurovision Song Contest ===
- Eurovision Song Contest 1960

=== Pulitzer Prize for Music ===
- Elliott Carter – String Quartet No. 2
