= Shelly Yakus =

American sound engineer

- Born: Sheldon Gershon Yakus; November 1945 (age 80)
- Occupations: Audio engineer; mixer
- Relatives: Milton Yakus (father)

Sheldon Gershon "Shelly" Yakus (born November 1945) is an American audio engineer and mixer. Formerly chief engineer and vice president of A&M Records, he was nominated for induction into the Rock and Roll Hall of Fame in 1999. Yakus is referenced at the end of one of Tom Petty's songs "What're You Doin' In My Life?" As of 2014, Yakus was chief engineer of AfterMaster Audio Labs and Recording Studios, a recording firm he co-founded with Larry Ryckman, who is its CEO. Yakus is also vice president of Studio One Media, Inc.

== Background ==
According to the August 1977 issue of Modern Recording, Shelly Yakus was considered to be one of the premier recording engineers in the business. His father owned Ace Recording in Boston. It was there that he was exposed to the recording technology which included wire recorders, mono, stereo, three-track and then four-track recorders. Settling in New York after being back and forth between New York and Boston many times, he worked at A&R recording studios for three years and then in 1970, he became a fixture at the Record Plant.

Yakus has engineered recordings for many performers, including John Lennon, the Ramones, U2, Tom Petty and the Heartbreakers, Van Morrison, Alice Cooper, the Band, Blue Öyster Cult, Dire Straits, Amy Grant, Don Henley, Madonna, Stevie Nicks, The Pointer Sisters, Raspberries, Lou Reed, Bob Seger, Patti Smith, Suzanne Vega, Warren Zevon, Cutting Crew, Star Radio, Elliott Murphy and Joan Armatrading. He acted as assistant engineer (1967–1969) for recordings by Dionne Warwick, Peter, Paul & Mary, Frankie Valli & The Four Seasons, Count Basie & His Orchestra, and Frank Sinatra.

== Career ==
Yakus engineered the Ain't Got No Time album for The Hamilton Face Band which was released in 1970.

Yakus worked at the Record Plant on Johnny Winter's John Dawson Winter III album that was released in November 1974.

Yakus did the mixing for U2's Under a Blood Red Sky album that was released in 1983.

== Family ==
Yakus is the son of songwriter Milton Yakus, known for composing "Old Cape Cod". Milton, with his brother, Herbert, owned Ace Recording Studios in Boston where Shelly worked in the 1960s before moving on to A & R Recording in New York.
