= The Waltz Queen =

The Waltz Queen may refer to:

- The Waltz Queen (Patti Page 1955 album), a 1955 Patti Page album issued on Mercury Records
- The Waltz Queen (Patti Page 1958 album), a 1958 Patti Page album issued on Wing Records
