= Live at Carnegie Hall: The 50th Anniversary Concert =

Live album by Patti Page
- Released: September 15, 1998
- Recorded: May 31, 1997
- Label: DRG

Patti Page live album chronology
Patti Page in Tokyo (1966)	Live at Carnegie Hall: The 50th Anniversary Concert (1998)

Live at Carnegie Hall: The 50th Anniversary Concert is a live album by Patti Page, released through the record label DRG in 1998. It was issued as a compact disc.

== Reception ==
Professional ratings
Review scores
Source	Rating
Allmusic	4.5/5 stars

The album won the 1999 Grammy Award for Best Traditional Pop Vocal Album.

== Track listing ==
1. "Person Who Used to Be Me/A Brand New Me" (Bell, Cohan, Gamble, Grossman) – 6:45
2. "With My Eyes Wide Open, I'm Dreaming" (Mack Gordon, Harry Revel) – 2:47
3. "It's a Wonderful World" (Adamson, Savitt, Watson) – 1:35
4. "Can You Feel the Love Tonight?" (Elton John, Tim Rice) – 3:46
5. "Ain't No Sunshine/You Are My Sunshine" (Jimmie Davis, Charles Mitchell, Bill Withers) – 2:44
6. Movie Medley: "In the Wee Small Hours" / "The Nearness of You" / "When I Fall in Love"
  (Hoagy Carmichael, Heyman, Hilliard, Mann, Ned Washington, Young) – 6:07
7. "Old Cape Cod" (Allan Jeffrey, Claire Rothrock, Milton Yakus) – 2:58
8. "Release Me" (Eddie Miller, Dub Williams, Robert Yount) – 3:32
9. "Go on Home" (Cochran) – 2:21
10. "Less Than the Song" (Axton) – 3:05
11. "Unchained Melody" (Alex North, Hy Zaret) – 4:46
12. "The More I See You" (Gordon, Harry Warren) – 2:59
13. "Allegheny Moon" (Al Hoffman, Dick Manning) – 2:33
14. "A Foggy Day" (George Gershwin, Ira Gershwin) – 4:03
15. "I Stayed Too Long at the Fair" (Barnes) – 5:49
16. "Detour" (Paul Westmoreland) – 3:54
17. Hits Medley: "(How Much Is That) Doggie in the Window" / "You Belong to Me"
  (Benjamin, Coleman, Darion, David, DeVol, Horton, Pee Wee King, Bob Merrill, Chilton Price, Robinson, Russell, Spina, Redd Stewart, Weiss) – 8:04
18. "Tennessee Waltz" (King, Stewart) – 2:35

== Personnel ==
- John Harris – engineer
- Chuck Hughes – drums
- Allan Jeffrey – composer
- Eric Kohler – design
- Claire Rothrock – composer
- Alan Silverman – mastering
- Milton Yakus – composer
