= String Quartet in F-sharp minor =

String Quartet in F-sharp minor may refer to:

- No. 4 of the String Quartets, Op. 50 (Haydn)
- String Quartet No. 7 (Shostakovich)
