= Arthur Korb =

American songwriter

- Born: June 21, 1909; Boston, Massachusetts, U.S.
- Died: March 16, 2003 (aged 93); San Juan, Puerto Rico
- Occupation: Songwriter

Arthur Korb (June 21, 1909 – March 16, 2003) was an American songwriter of popular music songs.

== Early life and education ==
Korb was born in Boston, Massachusetts. He attended Harvard University, earning the degrees of Bachelor of Arts and Master of Arts there in 1930, and a master's degree in music in 1932.

== Career ==
Among the songs which Korb wrote were "Acres of Diamonds," "Autumn Avenue," "The Fool of the Year," "Go On with the Wedding," "A Man Is Ten Feet Tall," "My Truly True Love," "She's Gonna Be Mine," "Take Me Home," "It Takes Time", and "Tell Me." The song "It Takes Time" was recorded by Louis Armstrong, Doris Day, Benny Goodman and Johnny Mercer among others.

One of his collaborators was Milton Yakus, the owner of the former Ace Recording Studios in Boston, Massachusetts. In 1953 Korb joined ASCAP. He published a book, How to Write Songs that Sell (1949). He wrote a musical, Jack's Cafe, when he was in his nineties.

== Personal life ==
Korb married Rose Levenson and had two children. He died in San Juan, Puerto Rico in 2003, at the age of 93.
