= The Waltz Queen (Patti Page 1957 album) =

Studio album by Patti Page
- Released: October 1957
- Recorded: circa April 1957
- Studio: Mercury Sound Studio, New York City
- Genre: Traditional pop
- Label: Mercury
- Producer: Vic Schoen/Jack Rael

Patti Page chronology
The East Side (1957)	The Waltz Queen (1957)	I've Heard That Song Before (1958)

Professional ratings
Review scores
Source	Rating
Allmusic	4/5 stars

The Waltz Queen is an LP album by Patti Page. The album was originally issued in October 1957 as a vinyl LP.

It was reissued by Universal Records in 2007 in compact disc form under catalog number 9349. It should not be confused with an album of the same name released by Mercury's Wing Records subsidiary in 1960 under catalog numbers MGW-12121 and SRW-16121, with all different songs.

The original mono of The Waltz Queen was issued under the title Waltzes Bring Memories with a different cover as MG-20049. It didn't sell so the new title and cover were created but the same catalog number used. The mono version in its original release included one image of the artist on the cover; in its reissue it featured two images of the artist, the same as the stereo version.

Billboard reviewed the album on March 17, 1958, saying: “Exceptionally strong packaging. The gal has never been better than in this creamy, nostalgic selection of three-beater favorites like “What’ll I Do,” “Till We Meet Again,” “The Boy Next Door”,” etc. Excellent backings by Vic Schoen and ork. Several bands here are worthy of singles exposure and the entire set should set a brisk pace at the counter.”

== Track listing ==
Track listings are different for different pressings. The original pressings included "What'll I Do," "Memories," "Till We Meet Again," "Whispering Winds," "Remember," "Now Is the Hour," "You Always Hurt the One You Love," "The Boy Next Door," "Falling in Love with Love," "Let the Rest of the World Go By," "That's All I'll Ever Ask of You" and "Wondering." Later pressings replaced "Whispering Winds" with "While We're Young." "That's All I'll Ever Ask of You" was replaced by "You Will Find Your Love (in Paris)."

Track number	Title	Songwriter(s)
1	"What'll I Do"	Irving Berlin
2	"Memories"	Egbert Van Alstyne/Gustave Kahn
3	"Till We Meet Again"	Richard A. Whiting/Raymond B. Egan
4	"While We're Young"	Alec Wilder/Morty Palitz/Bill Engvick
5	"Remember"	Irving Berlin
6	"Now Is the Hour"	Maewa Kaihan/Clement Scott/Dorothy Stewart
7	"You Always Hurt the One You Love"	Allan Roberts/Doris Fisher
8	"The Boy Next Door"	Hugh Martin/Ralph Blane
9	"Falling in Love with Love"	Richard Rodgers/Lorenz Hart
10	"Let the Rest of the World Go By"	J. Keirn Brennan/Ernest R. Ball
11	"You Will Find Your Love (In Paris)"	Mack Gordon/La Farge
12	"Wondering"	Jack Schafer
