= Songs for the New Depression =

Studio album by Bette Midler
- Released: January 8, 1976
- Recorded: 1972–76
- Studio: Electric Lady Studios (New York, NY); Mediasound Studios (New York, NY); Secret Sound Studios (New York, NY); Atlantic Recording Studios (New York, NY)
- Genre: Vocal
- Length: 38:47
- Label: Atlantic (SD 18155)
- Producer: Bette Midler, Joel Dorn, Ahmet Ertegün, Arif Mardin, Mark "Moogy" Klingman, Jack Malken

Bette Midler chronology
Bette Midler (1973)	Songs for the New Depression (1976)	Live at Last (1977)

Singles from Songs for the New Depression
- 1. "Strangers in the Night"; 2. "Samedi et Vendredi"; 3. "Old Cape Cod"

Songs for the New Depression is the third studio album by the American singer Bette Midler, released in early 1976 on the Atlantic Records label. The album was released on CD for the first time in 1990. A remastered version of the album was released by Atlantic Records/Warner Music in 1995. A limited edition remastered version of the album was released by Friday Music in 2014.

== Production ==
Professional ratings
Review scores
Source	Rating
AllMusic	4.5/5 stars
Christgau's Record Guide	C+
The Rolling Stone Album Guide	2.5/5 stars

The album which saw her making her debut as a composer ("Mr. Rockefeller" and the French language "Samedi et Vendredi"), as well as co-producer and sound engineer, features contributions from musicians as diverse as soul singer Luther Vandross, Todd Rundgren and Brazilian jazz accordionist Sivuca. Songs for the New Depression includes Midler's version of Tom Waits' "Shiver Me Timbers", a duet with Bob Dylan, "Buckets of Rain", and opens with her discofied take on Frank Sinatra's standard "Strangers in the Night" which became a No. 7 hit on the US dance chart. Two of the tracks, "Old Cape Cod" and "Marahuana", were originally recorded during the sessions for the 1972 debut album The Divine Miss M but remixed three years later by producers Lew Hahn and Arif Mardin for Songs for the New Depression.

== Reception ==
The album peaked at No. 27 on the Billboard albums chart.

Nick Kent of NME said, "This is easily the most infuriating album I've forced myself to co-exist with. I'm openly contemptuous of the motif - that of 'the new depression.' The arrangements are all exquisitely slick and Ms. Midler stays admirably, intimately in tune throughout. I even like parts of it despite my better judgment."

== Track listing ==
=== Side A ===
1. "Strangers in the Night" (Bert Kaempfert, Charles Singleton, Eddie Snyder) - 3:22
2. "I Don't Want the Night to End" (Phoebe Snow) - 3:53
3. "Mr. Rockefeller" (Jerry Blatt, Bette Midler) - 4:05
4. "Old Cape Cod" (Claire Rothrock, Allan Jeffrey, Milton Yakus) - 2:50
5. "Buckets of Rain" (Bob Dylan) - 4:00
6. "Love Says It's Waiting" (Nick Holmes) - 1:41
  - From The Promise Suite

=== Side B ===
1. "Shiver Me Timbers"/"Samedi et Vendredi" (Tom Waits, Midler, Moogy Klingman) - 6:25
2. "No Jestering" (Carlton Malcolm) - 3:59
3. "Tragedy" (Gerald Nelson, Fred Burch) - 3:06
4. "Marahuana" (Arthur Jonston, Sam Coslow) - 2:30
5. "Let Me Just Follow Behind" (Klingman) - 3:36

== Personnel ==
- Bette Midler – lead vocals (all tracks), backing vocals tracks B1–2
- Glaswegians Orchestra – arranged and conducted by Arif Mardin (track A1)
- Dianne Sumler – backing vocals (track A1)
- Luther Vandross – arranger and backing vocals (track A1)
- Norman Pride – conga (track A2)
- John Siegler – bass guitar (tracks A2–3, 5, B2, 5)
- John Wilcox – drums (tracks A2–3, 5, B2, 5)
- Todd Rundgren – guitar (tracks A2, B2), backing vocals (track B5)
- Moogy Klingman – electric piano, musical arranger, musical conductor, string arrangement (track A2), piano, RMI Computer keyboard, Mini Korg synthesizer, arranger and conductor (track A3), piano, harmonica and arranger (track A5)
- Ralph Schuckett – acoustic piano and string arrangement (track A2), clavinet (track A3), arranging assistance, arranger and conductor (track B1), piano, organ, arranger and conductor (track B2), piano (track B3), Sound City piano, electric piano, organ, harmonium, string ensemble, arranger and conductor (track B5)
- David Lasley – backing vocals (track A2)
- David Spinozza – guitar (tracks A3, B5)
- Erin Dickins – backing vocals (tracks A3, B3)
- Annie Sutton – backing vocals (track A3)
- Randy Brecker – horns (track A3), trumpet solo (track B5)
- Michael Brecker – horns (track A3)
- Barry Rogers – horns (track A3)
- Dick Hyman – piano (tracks A4, B4)
- Milt Hinton – acoustic bass (track A4), bass guitar (track B4)
- Teddy Sommer – drums (tracks A4, B4), percussion (track B4)
- Arif Mardin – arranger and conductor (track A4), backing vocals, arranger and conductor (track B4)
- Marty Nelson – vocal arranger (track A4)
- Bob Dylan – vocals (track A5)
- Dave Webster – slide guitar (track A5)
- Eric Weissberg – banjo and mandolin (track B1)
- Barbara Burton – percussion (track B1)
- Don Brooks – harmonica (track B1)
- Dominic Cortese – accordion (track B1)
- Boris Matusewitch – concertina (track B1)
- Steve Gadd – drums (track B1)
- John Miller – acoustic bass (track B1)
- Kenny Kosek – fiddle (track B1)
- John Lissauer – arranger and conductor (track B1), saxes, chimes, arranger and conductor (track B3)
- Mark Rosengarden – drums and percussion (track B1)
- Jack Malken – additional percussion (track B1)
- Sivuca – accordion (track B1)
- Jerry Friedman – guitar (track B2)
- Angel Allende – percussion (track B2)
- David Nadien – strings (track B3)
- Barry Finclair – strings (track B3)
- Raul Poliakin – strings (track B3)
- Tony Posk – strings (track B3)
- Gene Orloff – strings (track B3)
- Harry Lookofsky – strings (track B3)
- Charles McCracken – strings (track B3)
- Jessy Levy – strings (track B3)
- Donny Beard – backing vocals (track B3)
- Charlotte Crossley – backing vocals (tracks A1, B3)
- Leata Galloway – backing vocals (track B3)
- Ben Harney – backing vocals (track B3)
- Rhetta Hughes – backing vocals (track B3)
- Thomas Moore – backing vocals (track B3)
- Ula Hedwig – backing vocals (tracks A1, B3)
- Sharon Redd – backing vocals (tracks A1, B3)
- Ramona Stubblefield – backing vocals (track B3)
- Clifford Townsend – backing vocals (track B3)
- Revelation – backing vocals (track B3)
- Rosie – backing vocals (track B3)
- Mel Davis – trumpet (track B4)
- William Siapin – flute (track B4)
- Harry Lookofsky – violin (track B4)
- Matthew Raimondi – violin (track B4)
- Emanuel Green – violin (track B4)
- Gotham – backing vocals (track B4)
- Rick Derringer – pedal steel guitar (track B5)

== Production ==
- Moogy Klingman – record producer for Moogtown Productions
- Jack Malken – production assistant, recording and remix engineer, engineer (track A5)
- Bette Midler – assistant engineer, producer (tracks A4, B4)
- Deborah Turbville – photography
- Michaele Vollbracht – shopping bag
- Kenn Duncan – poster photos
- Richard Amsel – inner sleeve illustration
- Lew Hahn – recording engineer and remix engineer (track A1)
- Gerry Block – assistant engineer (track A1)
- Dave Wittman – assistant engineer (track A1)
- Arif Mardin – record producer (track A1)
- Ahmet Ertegün – production assistance (track A1)
- Joel Dorn – producer (tracks A4, B4)
- Jan Rathbun – engineer (track A5)
- Recorded and mixed at Secret Sound Studio, New York, N.Y.
- Track A1 recorded at Electric Lady and Mediasound Studios, New York, N.Y.
- Tracks A4 and B4 recorded at Atlantic Recording Studios, New York by Lew Hahn, remixed by Lew Hahn and Arif Mardin

== Charts ==
Chart performance for Songs for the New Depression
Chart (1976)	Peak position
Australian Albums (Kent Music Report)	50
US Billboard 200	27
US Top 100 Albums (Cash Box)	14
US The Album Chart (Record World)	20
