= William Garland =

William or Billy Garland may refer to:

- William Garland (politician) (1856–1901), politician in Manitoba, Canada
- William Foster Garland (1875–1941), Ontario merchant and political figure
- William May Garland (1866–1948), real estate developer in Los Angeles
- William McKinley “Red” Garland Jr. (1923–1984), American jazz pianist
- Billy Garland (1918–1960), American blues musician
- Billy Garland (activist) (born 1949), former Black Panther and biological father of Tupac Shakur
