= Mighty Good =

Single by Ricky Nelson
- A-side: "I Wanna Be Loved"
- Released: November 9, 1959
- Genre: Rock and roll
- Label: Imperial
- Songwriter(s): Baker Knight

Ricky Nelson singles chronology
"Just a Little Too Much" / "Sweeter Than You" (1959)	"Mighty Good" (1959)	"Young Emotions" / "Right by My Side" (1960)

"Mighty Good" is a song written by Baker Knight and performed by Ricky Nelson. The song reached #38 on the Billboard Hot 100 in 1959. The single's A-side, "I Wanna Be Loved", reached #20 on the Billboard Hot 100 and #30 in the UK.
