= Skuta (surname) =

Skuta or Škuta is a surname. Notable people with the surname include:

- Dan Skuta (born 1986), American football player
- Mikuláš Škuta (born 1960), Slovak pianist and composer
