= This Is My Song =

This Is My Song may refer to:

== Albums ==
- This Is My Song (Ray Conniff album) (1967)
- This Is My Song (Patti Page album) (1957)
- This Is My Song (Deniece Williams album) (1998)

== Songs ==
- "This is my song" (1934 song), a song written by Lloyd Stone to the tune of Jean Sibelius' Finlandia
- "This Is My Song" (1951 song), a song written by Dick Charles and popularized in 1953 by Patti Page
- "This Is My Song" (1967 song), a song written by Charles Chaplin and popularized in 1967 by Petula Clark
- "This Is My Song!", a 2004 song by Carbon Lead from Indian Summer
