= Symphony No. 4 (Arnold) =

Symphony by Malcolm Arnold

Cover of the printed score of Malcolm Arnold's Symphony No. 4

The Symphony No. 4, Op. 71 by Malcolm Arnold was finished on 13 July 1960. It is in four movements:

1. Allegro
2. Vivace ma non troppo
3. Andantino
4. Con fuoco

The work was commissioned by William Glock for the BBC. The composer conducted the first performance with the BBC Symphony Orchestra on 2 November 1960 at the Royal Festival Hall.

The composer wrote in 1971 that the symphony was a reaction to the Notting Hill race riots of 1958. He was appalled that such a thing could happen in Britain. And expressed his hope that it might help to spread the idea of racial integration.

== Instrumentation ==
The symphony is scored for the following large orchestra:

Piccolo, 2 flutes, 2 oboes, 2 clarinets, 2 bassoons, contrabassoon, 4 horns, 3 trumpets, 3 trombones, tuba, timpani, bass drum, snare drum, bongos, tom-toms, maracas, tam-tam, marimba, celesta, harp and strings.

== Commercial recordings ==
- 1974 Malcolm Arnold and the BBC Symphony Orchestra on ARIES LP (Bootleg of the 2nd performance in 1960, the credits on the LP are bogus)
- 1990 Malcolm Arnold and the London Philharmonic Orchestra on Lyrita SRCD.200 (Lyrita's first CD only release)
- 1994 Richard Hickox and the London Symphony Orchestra on Chandos Records CHAN 9290
- 1996 Vernon Handley and the Royal Liverpool Philharmonic on Conifer Records 75605-51258-2 (re-released on Decca 4765337)
- 1998 Andrew Penny and the RTÉ National Symphony Orchestra on Naxos Records 8.553739 (recorded 13–14 June 1996, in the presence of the composer)
- 2021: Keith Lockhart and the BBC Concert Orchestra on BBC Music Magazine V29N7 (recorded 14 Oct 2018)
