= Anaklasis =

1960 composition composed by Krzysztof Penderecki

- Music for string orchestra by Krzysztof Penderecki
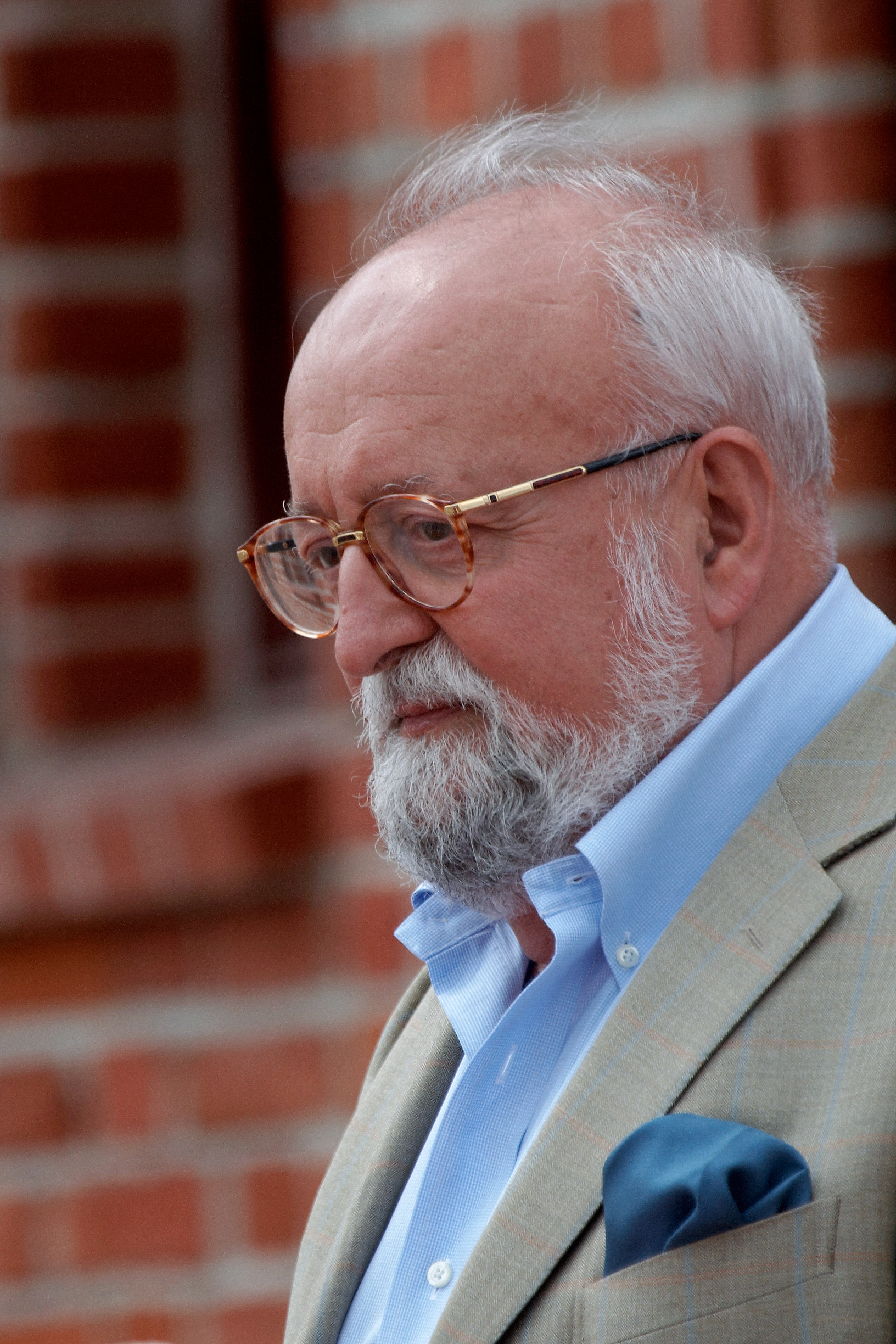
- The composer in 2008
- Composed: 1960
- Dedication: Prince Rainier III
- Performed: 14 August 1960: Donaueschingen Festival
- Publisher: PWM; Schott
- Duration: 7 to 8 min.
- Scoring: 20 violins; 8 violas; 8 cellos; 6 double basses; celesta; harp; piano; large percussion section

Anaklasis is a composition for 42 string instruments and percussion, composed in 1960 by the Polish composer Krzysztof Penderecki. It was first performed at the Donaueschingen Festival in 1960. At this first performance, it was well received by the audience who demanded an encore.

The title of the piece, Anaklasis means "Refraction of Light". This idea is expressed through the continuous modulation of timbre in the piece. Anaklasis is also a metrical term used in Greek poetry. Penderecki's biographer, Wolfram Schwinger noted that, "Penderecki has indeed admitted, in his programme note for Donaueschingen 1960 when Anaklasis was first performed, that this metrical definition inspired the rhythmic procedure of the central section, and led to the ideas of rotation and arhythmical progressions as factors governing the rhythms generally."

== History ==
Anaklasis was first sketched and scored in the winter of 1959/60 during Penderecki's first visit to Italy. Schwinger said of the piece, it is "a document of extreme differentiated and multifarious composition in sound-patterns, a work of the most complicated noise-structures." Penderecki sought "the seamless transformation of sound-qualities, the flexible passage from sound to noise and vice versa." It is one of Penderecki's first pieces to use the special effects and inventive notations for which he is most known. Special effects he uses in the piece include dropping of a pencil on the strings of the piano and stroking the strings with jazz brushes.

== Form ==
The form of the pieces is tripartite, with an A section which is strings alone, a B section which is percussion alone, and a C section which is a mixture of the two. The A section begins with five solo strings which begin and add to a pianissimo tone cluster in sequence starting with a solo viola's a. Larger groups of strings superimpose sforzandi on these entrances. Penderecki uses a large variety of articulations and string techniques to vary the color and texture of the first section which is characterized by continuity of noise and sound. Groups of strings play clusters of pitch, some definite and some indefinite, which contrast in timbre by the use of harmonics, tremolo, vibrato, col legno, pizzicato, and sul ponticello. In addition to timbre, the strings contrast in dynamic and register.

Penderecki carefully transitions into the percussion B section with relative smoothness in opposition to the contrast in timbre. The B section generally has a somewhat smooth and even sound, but this is created by an extremely complex combination of rhythmic microstructures. On a micro scale, the section is characterized by rhythmic cancrizans, canons, and other procedural units. As with the A section, a large variety of timbres are executed through the large number of instruments and playing techniques.

The piece transitions into the C section by reducing the orchestra in sequence until it is only ten violins playing pppp in a tight tone cluster. In this last section, Penderecki blends the strings and percussion with a combination of percussion sounds, string tremolo glissandi, and unconventional piano techniques. The piece ends with a chord played pizzicato on the inside of the piano.

== Scoring and notation ==
The piece is scored for 20 violins, 8 violas, 8 celli, 6 double basses, celesta, harp, piano, and a large percussion section including xylorimba, congas, wooden-drums, vibraphone, bongos, bells, cymbals, glockenspiel, tom-toms, triangle, gong, tam-tam, and timpani to be played by six percussionists. Additionally, the pianist is responsible for playing wooden claves or rumba-sticks.

The tempi in the beginning and end of the piece are noted in durations of seconds. The middle section uses more conventional metronome marks which range from quarter note equals 44 to quarter note equals 80.

== Performances and recordings ==
- First Performance: Southwest German Radio Symphony Orchestra, Hans Rosbaud, conductor, Donaueschingen Festival, 16 October 1960.
- Warsaw Philharmonic Orchestra, Andrzej Markowski, conductor; Polish Gramophone SXL 0260, Wergo 60020
- London Symphony Orchestra, Krzysztof Penderecki, conductor; EMI Electrola SHZE 393
