= I Wanna Be Loved (Ricky Nelson song) =

Single by Ricky Nelson
- B-side: "Mighty Good"
- Released: November 9, 1959
- Genre: Rock and roll
- Length: 2:32
- Label: Imperial
- Songwriter(s): Baker Knight

Ricky Nelson singles chronology
"Just a Little Too Much" / "Sweeter Than You" (1959)	"I Wanna Be Loved" (1959)	"Young Emotions" / "Right by My Side" (1960)

"I Wanna Be Loved" is a song written by Baker Knight and performed by Ricky Nelson. The song reached #20 on the Billboard Hot 100 and #30 in the UK in 1959. The single's B-side, "Mighty Good", reached #38 on the Billboard Hot 100.
