= Ain't Got No Time =

1970 album by The Hamilton Face Band

Studio album by The Hamilton Face Band
- Released: 1970
- Label: Bell 6042
- Producer: Johanan Vigoda

The Hamilton Face Band chronology
| The Hamilton Face Band (1969) | Ain't Got No Time (1970) |

Ain't Got No Time is a 1970 album by The Hamilton Face Band. It met with a positive reception and had some chart success that year.

== Background ==
Ain't Got No Time was released on Bell 6042 in 1970.

The group took eighteen months to prepare for the album. They were produced by Johanan Vigoda, the business attorney who took them to the Bell label. The musicians included Lenny Laks on lead vocals, Ronnie Seldin on lead guitar, Alan Cooper on Bass and Ruth Underwood on drums.

== Reception ==
The album was a Special Merit Pick in the 14 February 1970 issue of Billboard. In addition to singling out the tracks, "United States Atomic Energy" and "Control Plant" as being perfect for underground appreciation, the reviewer also wrote that the Hamilton Face Band was the kind of group that would win friends on both the AM and FM levels, and gave "I Ain't Got No Time" and "Who Did You Fool Today" as good examples.

The album was a Four Star Pick Hit in the 21 February issue of Record World. The reviewer said that the band laid on the hot sounds and for the crowds who delight in this, and they would cotton on to it.

The album was reviewed in the 12 June 1975 issue of the Post Amerikan. It was positive with the jazz elements that were intertwined in with the music being mentioned. Ruth Underwood's fine drumming was also pointed out as well as the tightness of the album.

== Charts ==
For the week of 7 February, Ain't Got No Time debuted at No. 47 in the Record World LP's Coming Up chart. The album peaked at No. 21 for the week of 7 March and held that position for an additional week. It was still in the chart for the week of 21 March.

== Tracks ==
=== Side 1 ===
1. " I Ain't Got No Time"
2. "Trying To Get Up to You"
3. "Chinese Guitar / Michael Gladstone Symphony"
4. "Slippery Sweet"
5. "United States Atomic Energy Control Plant"

=== Side 2 ===
1. "Ghost Of a Highway Child"
2. "Love the Good Guys (Leave Out Space and Time for the Bad Guys)"
3. "No More Blues"
4. " All On Me"
5. "Still Standing Still"
6. "Over And Over Again"
