= Old Cape Cod =

- Sheet music front cover

Single by Patti Page
- B-side: "Wondering"
- Released: April 23, 1957
- Genre: Traditional (classic) pop
- Length: 2:14
- Label: Mercury
- Songwriters: Claire Rothrock; Milton Yakus; Allan Jeffrey
- Producer: Vic Schoen

Patti Page singles chronology
"A Poor Man's Roses (Or a Rich Man's Gold)" (1957)	"Old Cape Cod" (1957)	"I'll Remember Today" (1957)

Audio sample
- "Old Cape Cod": file; help

"Old Cape Cod" is a song written by Claire Rothrock, Milton Yakus and Allan Jeffrey that was published in 1957. The single, as recorded by Patti Page, became a gold record, having sold more than a million copies. Hailed by Cape Cod natives as the "unofficial Cape Cod Anthem, if ever there was one," the song has been credited with "putting the Cape on the map" and helping to establish Cape Cod as a major tourist destination.

== Background ==
The song extols the virtues of Cape Cod as a leisure destination with each verse ending with the line "You're sure to fall in love with old Cape Cod." The nucleus of the song was a poem written by Boston-area housewife Claire Rothrock, for whom Cape Cod was a favorite vacation spot. "Old Cape Cod" and its derivatives would be Rothrock's sole evident songwriting credit. She brought her poem to Ace Studios, a Boston recording studio owned by Milton Yakus, who adapted the poem into the song's lyrics. His associate Allan Jeffrey wrote the music and a demo recording was made at Ace.

If you're fond of sand dunes and salty air,
Quaint little villages here and there,
You're sure to fall in love with old Cape Cod.

— excerpted lyrics to "Old Cape Cod", adapted by M. Yakus from the poem by C. Rothrock

== Patti Page version ==
=== Recording and impact ===
Patti Page had previously had a hit with the Milton Yakus composition "Go on with the Wedding" in 1956. However, according to Page, Claire Rothrock brought "Old Cape Cod" directly to her, approaching Page at a Boston nightclub where the singer was performing. Page says of the song: "I just fell in love with it." She recorded "Old Cape Cod" during a day trip to New York City, enabling her return to Boston in time for that evening's nightclub performance. The song was intended to be the B-side of her next single, "Wondering".

The "Wondering"/"Old Cape Cod" single was released by Mercury Records on April 23, 1957 as catalog number 71101. Both tracks debuted on the Billboard magazine charts for the week ending June 3, and "Old Cape Cod" quickly became the dominant track, peaking at number three on Billboard's Most Played by Jockeys chart, number eight on the Best Sellers In Stores chart and number seven on the Top 100 composite chart for 1957. "Old Cape Cod" spent 18 weeks on the Cash Box magazine Best Selling Singles list, peaking at number eight and holding there for three consecutive weeks. The song was a hit in Australia, peaking at number 14.

=== Legacy ===
Page had never visited Cape Cod until after the song had been released and became a hit. She later recalled her first visit to the Cape, saying:

I could not believe it when I finally did go, because I realized that [the song] had captured something about a place that I had had within me for so many years, but never knew. It's unexplainable to me, because it's so dear to me – I knew I had been here before [although] I hadn't.

— Patti Page, February 27, 2010

Her last visit to Cape Cod was in February 2010, when she attended a ceremony held in her honor at the Cape Cod Chamber of Commerce. Massachusetts state senator Robert O'Leary remarked:

There was something there, in that song – [for] a lot of us who grew up on the Cape, who lived on the Cape, who spent our summers here – [that we] always think of when we think of Cape Cod: we think of you, and that song. So, we really owe you a big 'thank you' for that.

— Massachusetts State Senator Robert O'Leary, February 27, 2010

Symbolizing Page's "contributions in the promotion of Cape Cod through the years and with her music", the ceremony culminated with the O'Leary's dedication and the unveiling of a new street sign, as the road leading to the Chamber of Commerce was renamed Patti Page Way.

Following Page's death on January 1, 2013, the Chamber of Commerce credited the song's success with helping to establish Cape Cod as a major tourist destination:

We think she put the Cape on the map. Before the Kennedys, before our successful marketing ever did it, she did.

— Wendy Northcross, Executive Director, Cape Cod Chamber of Commerce

The song was referenced by Bruce Johnston in the lyrics of "Disney Girls", his nostalgic song about growing up in the 1950s: "Patti Page and summer days on old Cape Cod."

== Other versions ==
- "Old Cape Cod" was the subject of a 1990 lawsuit after a sound-alike song appeared in a 1989 commercial for American Savings Bank. Page sued the advertising agency, alleging that the commercial implied that Page endorsed the bank.
- Bing Crosby performed "Old Cape Cod" on his CBS Radio program in 1957, and the recording was released after his death. Also in 1957, Michael Holliday covered the song for the U.K. market. His version, which featured the Norrie Paramor Orchestra, failed to chart. The Norman Petty Trio also recorded the song in 1957, a version that was originally featured on the Top 12 Vol 4 multi-artist compilation album and subsequently on Songs of New England, a 1962 multi-artist compilation album.
- In 1960, Susan Barrett recorded "Old Cape Cod" for her A Little Travelin' Music album. The track was included on the 1994 multi-artist compilation Capitol Sings Coast to Coast. Also in 1960, instrumentalist Billy Vaughn included the song on his soundtrack album for The Sundowners and as the B-side of the title track's single release, which reached #51.
- Jerry Vale's 1963 version bubbled under the Hot 100, peaking at #118. It was included on his 1965 album Have You Looked into Your Heart. Also in 1963, Bobby Rydell remade "Old Cape Cod" for his Wild (Wood) Days album.
- In 1965 the Four Freshmen recorded a version "Old Cape Cod" as the B-side for their theme for the film Those Magnificent Men in Their Flying Machines. Neither side became a hit, but "Old Cape Cod" did reach #33 on the Easy Listening chart. Also in 1965, recordings of "Old Cape Cod" were made by Robert Goulet for his album Summer Sounds and by Jane Morgan for her album In My Style.
- Tennessee Ernie Ford recorded the song for his 1968 album release Tennessee Ernie Ford's World of Pop and Country Hits. That same year, Dottie West recorded the song for her album Feminine Fancy.
- Bette Midler recorded the song for her 1972 debut album The Divine Miss M, although the track, which was produced by Midler with Joel Dorn, first appeared on 1976's Songs for the New Depression and reached #36 on the adult contemporary chart.
- Anne Murray remade the song for Croonin', a 1993 album consisting of hit songs from the 1950s.
- An instrumental version of "Old Cape Cod" was featured on the 1998 album Matinee Idylls, recorded by Dean Cassell and Milt Reder of Super Genius under the name Four Piece Suit.
- Emile Pandolfi covered an instrumental piano version of the song for his album What a Wonderful World in 1999.
- Mary Duff recorded the song for her 2006 album release Time After Time; the song was the first title in a Patti Page medley that also featured "With My Eyes Wide Open, I'm Dreaming" and "Allegheny Moon."
- In 2007, the Puppini Sisters recorded the song for their album The Rise & Fall of Ruby Woo.

Other artists who have recorded "Old Cape Cod" include:

- Beegie Adair
- Thumbs Carllile
- Wild Bill Davison
- Don Lanphere
- John Prine
- Jimmie Rodgers
- In 2008, a mid-tempo version was recorded by "Buffalo Crooner" Mark Weber.
- A Danish rendering of "Old Cape Cod," entitled "Der er bedst hos dig," was recorded by Ivan Meldgaard & the Four Jacks (da) in 1958. In 1967 Shirley Théroux (fr) recorded "Old Cape Cod" with French lyrics for her self-titled album, and the track appeared as the B-side of her single "Un homme est dans ma vie."
- A sample of Patti Page's recording formed the basis of Groove Armada's 1997 UK hit "At the River". The lines "If you're fond of sand dunes and salty air / Quaint little villages here and there," sung in Page's multi-tracked close harmony, are repeated with the addition of synthesizer bass, slowed-down drums and a bluesy trombone solo to produce a chill-out track.
- American Idol finalist and Cape Cod native Siobhan Magnus released a version in February 2013 honoring Page, who had died earlier in the year, and donating 50% of sales to the United Way.

== Soundtrack appearances ==
- "Old Cape Cod" was featured in the 1990 film Die Hard 2, playing on a phonograph record in a character's airport basement apartment.
- The song plays on the radio in the Donna Deitch film Desert Hearts (1985) when the main character, played by Helen Shaver, moves to a new apartment in Reno, Nevada in the late 1950s.
- In 2006, the song appeared in the Ridley Scott movie A Good Year, starring Russell Crowe and Marion Cotillard.
- On August 8, 2010, the song appeared on AMC's Mad Men Season 4 episode "The Good News."
- In 2021 the song was featured in the ‘Red Tide’ portion of American Horror Stories 10th season, “Double Feature.”
- Featured in a montage towards the end of the 2026 film, Tony. A fictionalization of Anthony Bourdain's beginnings as a chef in the late 1970s and filmed in Provincetown, the film stars Dominic Sessa as Bourdain and Antonio Banderas as "Chef," a mentor of Bourdain's.
