= The Hamilton Face Band =

- Origin: United States
- Genres: Rock music
- Years active: late 1960s - early 1970s
- Labels: Philips, Bell
- Past members: *Alan Cooper; *Ruth Komanoff aka Ruth Romonoff, Ruth Underwood; *Lenny Laks; *Steve Margoshes; *Ronnie Seldin

The Hamilton Face Band was a 5-piece rock band that was formed in the late 1960s. They recorded for the Philips and Bell record labels. Their drummer was Ruth Underwood; her maiden name, Komanoff was rendered as "Romonoff" on the sleeve of their first album. The group had success with their second album.

== Background ==
The group was made up of Lenny Laks on lead vocals, Ronnie Seldin on lead guitar, Alan Cooper on bass, Steve Margoshes on keyboards and Ruth Underwood on drums. Underwood was also a vibraphonist and played that and other percussion instruments on several The Mothers of Invention/Frank Zappa albums.

== Career ==
=== 1969 ===
In early April 1969, the Hamilton Face band performed at the Scene. The review of their performance was published in 12 April issue of Cash Box. According to the reviewer, they saw the band some months prior at the Cafe Au Go Go. They gave up on the band at the time as the singer wasn't up to standard, the female drummer was stiff, and the songs weren't doing it for them. They didn't do a review on that performance. However, a few months later, they caught the band again, this time at the Scene. Mercury staffers, Rick Bolsom (PR) and Anne Tansey (producer) grabbed them and told them to sit down. They were amazed at the transformation and wrote that the group had matured into a small jazz rock band. Drummer Ruth Romonoff (Komonoff) played like a rock drummer instead of a percussionist, Lenny Laks had control over his voice as did Alan Cooper. They were also alternating on bass guitar and trumpet. Keyboardist Steve Margoshes was said to be one of the most promising talents that they had seen for a long time. And Ronnie Seldin's lead guitar was said to be standout. They performed the song from their debut single, "High Why and Die Company" as well as "Speed Song" and "Choirboys / Allright"

Their debut album was also due for immanent release.

==== Debut album and single ====
Their self-titled album which was produced by Anne Tansey was released in April. It was a Special Merit Pick in the 19 April issue of Billboard. Referring to their debut album as auspicious, the reviewer also wrote that with its tight musicianship, it would appeal to underground markets, and it had several winning numbers on it including the first rate instrumental, "Speed Song" and other tracks, "High Why and Die Company" "Trying to Get Up to You" and "Slippery Sweet".

Their single "High Why and Die Company" bw "Banana Song" which was produced by Anne Tansey was released on Philips 40603. It was reviewed in the 19 April issue of Record World, where it was a four star pick. The reviewer wrote that they were getting it all together and playing it like it sells.

==== Further activities ====
On Tuesday 1 July 1969, the Hamilton Face Band played at Ungano's in New York. Fred Kirby's review of their performance was published in the 12 July issue of Billboard. He pointed out that the quintet's line up was the same as credited on their album, but there were some slight changes on duties when it came to them playing live. The less complicated, harder sound that they were said to have changed to was evident in the song, "No More Blues". Some of the better material performed were the album tracks, "High Why and Die Company", a driving song and the more laid back "Steamwhistle". Overall, the review was positive with Kirby finishing off with informing the reader that their new format was closer to today's sound.

=== 1970 ===
The Hamilton Face band played at the Bitter End in New York on 18 February 1970. The review by Fred Kirby was published in the 28 February issue of Billboard. The review was very positive with the drummer now being referred to as Ruth Underwood. The material they covered included songs, "Who Did You Fool Today" and "Ghost of a Highway Child", which were from their Bell album.

==== Ain't Got No Time album ====
Working with producer Johanan Vigoda, the man who took them to Bell Records, the group recorded their album, Ain't Got No Time which by February 1970 was available. It was released on Bell 6042. It included the tracks, "I Ain't Got No Time", "Who Did You Fool Today", "Theme from No Money" and "The High, Why & Die Company".

The album was a Special Merit Pick in the 14 February 1970 issue of Billboard. In addition to singling out the tracks, "United States Atomic Energy" and "Control Plant" as being perfect for underground appreciation, the reviewer also wrote that the Hamilton Face Band was the kind of group that would win friends on both the AM and FM levels, and gave "I Ain't Got No Time" and "Who Did You Fool Today" as good examples.

The album was a Four Star Pick Hit in the 21 February issue of Record World. The reviewer said that the band laid on the hot sounds and for the crowds who delight in this, and they would cotton on to it.

For the week of 7 February, Ain't Got No Time debuted at No. 47 in the Record World LP's Coming Up chart. The album peaked at No. 21 for the week of 7 March and held that position for an additional week. It was still in the chart for the week of 21 March.

==== Further activities ====
The Hamilton Face Band was booked to play at the Electric Circus from 20 to 24 May.

Appearing at the Capitol Theater in Port Chester, New York, The Hamilton Face Band was on the same bill as James Taylor and Jo-Ann Kelly. The performances of the three acts were reviewed in the 30 May issue of Cash Box. The review wasn't complementary and their lack of cohesiveness was given as the reason for them not measuring up to the standards of the other two acts that evening.

=== 1971 ===
The group was pictured on the front page of the 17 March 1971 issue of The Boilermaker.

== Line up ==
- Lenny Laks – vocals, saxophone, trumpet, recorder, bass
- Ronnie Seldin – guitars, bass
- Steve Margoshes – piano, trombone
- Alan Cooper – bass, vocals, trumpet
- Ruth Komanoff aka Ruth Underwood – drums

== Discography ==
=== Single ===
- The Hamilton Face Band - "High Why and Die Company" / "Banana Song" - Philips 40603 - 1969

=== Albums ===
- Hamilton Face Band - Kabbalat Shabbat (Electric Rock Worship Service for a Sabbath Eve) - TJU-1001 - 1968
- The Hamilton Face Band – The Hamilton Face Band - Philips PHS 600-308 - 1969
- The Hamilton Face Band – Ain't Got No Time - Bell BELL 6042 - 1970
