= Chronochromie =

1960 orchestral work by Olivier Messiaen

Chronochromie (Time-Colour) is an orchestral work by French composer Olivier Messiaen, completed in 1960. It consists of seven movements:

1. Introduction
2. Strophe I
3. Antistrophe I
4. Strophe II
5. Antistrophe II
6. Epode
7. Coda

The sixth movement consists of 18 string instruments playing different birdsong. The first performance was in Donaueschingen on 16 October 1960, conducted by Hans Rosbaud.

== Instrumentation ==
The work is scored for the following orchestra:

Woodwinds
4 flutes (doubling piccolo)
3 oboes (doubling cor anglais)
4 clarinets (doubling E♭ clarinet and bass clarinet)
3 bassoons

Brass
4 horns
4 trumpets (doubling piccolo trumpet in D)
3 trombones
1 tuba

Percussion (6 players)
1 glockenspiel
1 xylophone
1 marimba
bells
3 gongs
suspended cymbal
chinese cymbal
tam-tam

Strings
16 Violin I's
16 Violin II's
14 Violas
12 Celli
10 Double basses
