= A Scottish Soldier =

1960 Scottish song

"A Scottish Soldier" is a song written and recorded in 1960 by Andy Stewart, using the tune of "The Green Hills of Tyrol", which was transcribed by John MacLeod during the Crimean War from "La Tua Danza Sì Leggiera", a chorus part in the third act of Gioachino Rossini's 1829 opera Guglielmo Tell (William Tell). The song is about a dying Scottish soldier, wishing to return to the hills of his homeland rather than die in the Tyrol. The song was one of two US chart entries by Andy Stewart. "A Scottish Soldier" reached no. 1 in Canada (3 weeks), Australia, and New Zealand. It spent 36 weeks in the UK Singles Chart in 1961. English singer David Whitfield covered the song.
