= Just a Closer Walk with Thee (album) =

Studio album by Patti Page
- Released: September 1960
- Recorded: November 13, 1959–January 28, 1960, New York City
- Genre: Spirituals
- Label: Mercury
- Producer: Shelby Singleton

Patti Page chronology
3 Little Words (1959)	Just a Closer Walk with Thee (1960)	Sings and Stars in "Elmer Gantry" (1961)

Professional ratings
Review scores
Source	Rating
Allmusic	3/5 stars

Just a Closer Walk with Thee is an LP album of spiritual songs sung by Patti Page, released by Mercury Records. It was released in September 1960 as a vinyl LP.

== Track listing ==
Track number	Title	Songwriter(s)	Recording date	Time
1	Swing Low, Sweet Chariot	Wallis Willis (Adapted by Malcolm Dodds)	November 13, 1959	3:15
2	Steal Away	(Adapted by Malcolm Dodds)	November 13, 1959	3:15
3	Little David	(Adapted by Malcolm Dodds)	January 28, 1960	2:20
4	Nobody Knows	(Adapted by Malcolm Dodds)	November 13, 1959	3:10
5	I Couldn't Hear Nobody Pray	(Adapted by Malcolm Dodds)	November 16, 1959	2:55
6	Motherless Child	Traditional (Adapted by Malcolm Dodds)	November 13, 1959	2:48
7	Just a Closer Walk with Thee	Stuart Hine (Adapted by Malcolm Dodds)	November 16, 1959	3:30
8	My Lord What a Mornin'	H. T. Burleigh (Adapted by Malcolm Dodds)	January 28, 1960	2:30
9	Great Getting Up Mornin'	(Adapted by Malcolm Dodds)	January 28, 1960	3:25
10	Were You There	(Adapted by Malcolm Dodds)	November 16, 1959	3:23
11	Break Bread	(Adapted by Malcolm Dodds)	November 16, 1959	3:25
12	Me! Oh Lord	(Adapted by Malcolm Dodds)	November 13, 1959	2:10
