= The Waltz Queen (Patti Page 1958 album) =

Compilation album by Patti Page
- Released: January 1958
- Genre: Traditional pop
- Label: Wing
- Producer: Vic Schoen

Patti Page compilation album chronology
This Is My Song (1956)	The Waltz Queen (1958)	Golden Hits (1960)

The Waltz Queen is a compilation album by Patti Page. It was released in January 1958 on Wing Records, a subsidiary company of the larger Mercury Records. It was distributed as a vinyl LP.

It should not be confused with an album of the same name released by Mercury in 1955 under catalog numbers MG-20049 and SR-60049. It was issued in two versions, one with 12 tracks and one with only 10. The album was reissued with a similar cover as simply Patti Page because of the confusion in using the same title as a popular full-priced release by the label's top star. The stereo version didn't involve much stereo, as almost all the tracks originated as mono singles. One exception was "Born to Be With You," intended for a single release which never took place.

Vic Schoen and his Orchestra provided the musical accompaniment. He was also the musical director, recording supervisor and engineer.

== Track listing ==
Track number		Title	Songwriter(s)	Time
12-track version	10-track version			
1	1	"Mad About the Boy"	Noël Coward	3:06
2	2	"Born to Be With You"	Don Robertson	2:31
3	3	"The Strangest Romance"	Fay Tishman	2:09
4	4	"That Old Feeling"	Lew Brown, Sammy Fain	
5	5	"Steam Heat"	Richard Adler, Jerry Ross	2:16
6	(absent)	"Croce Di Oro (Cross Of Gold)"	Kim Gannon	2:40
7	6	"Once in a While"	Michael Edwards, Bud Green	2:55
8	7	"My Restless Lover"	Pembroke Davenport	3:00
9	8	"You Don't Know What Love Is"	Gene DePaul, Don Raye	3:11
10	9	"Tomorrow But Not Today"	Tishman	2:58
11	10	"I Wonder Where Oh Where You Are"	Phil Springer, Sid Wayne	2:30
12	(absent)	"You Are the One"	Dorcas Cochran, Henri Contet, Paul Durand, Irving Taylor	2:32
