= Wondering (Patti Page song) =

Song performed by Patti Page

Song by Patti Page
- A-side: "Wondering"
- B-side: "Old Cape Cod"
- Released: 1957
- Genre: Pop
- Label: Mercury Records
- Songwriter(s): Jack Schafer

Patti Page singles chronology
"Wondering" (1957)	"Old Cape Cod" (1957)

"Wondering" is a popular song written by Jack Schafer and recorded by Patti Page .

The recording by Patti Page was released by Mercury Records as catalog number 71101. It first reached the Billboard magazine charts on June 3, 1957. On the Disk Jockey chart, it peaked at #12; on the composite chart of the top 100 songs, it reached #35. The flip side was "Old Cape Cod."
