= Go On with the Wedding =

Song by Patti Page
- Published: 1956
- Songwriters: Arthur Korb, Charlie Purvis, Milton Yakus

"Go On with the Wedding" is a popular song written by Arthur Korb, Charlie Purvis, and Milton Yakus and published in 1954. Its lyrics are reminiscent of another post-Korean War song, "Returned from Missing in Action."

The recording by Patti Page was released by Mercury Records as catalog number 70766 in 1955. It first reached the Billboard magazine charts on January 7, 1956. On the Disk Jockey chart, it peaked at #16; on the Best Seller chart, at #17; on the Juke Box chart, at #12; on the composite chart of the top 100 songs, it reached #11. "Go On with the Wedding" afforded Page a #19 hit in Australia.

The song was also recorded and briefly charted at #39 as a duet by Kitty Kallen and Georgie Shaw in 1956.
