= Post Amerikan =

The Post Amerikan (sometimes Post-Amerikan and sometimes Post) was an alternative newspaper based in Bloomington-Normal, Illinois. The paper was founded in 1972.

The Post Amerikan was staffed entirely by volunteers and was financed through the sale of advertising space and subscriptions along with donations and community fundraisers. The paper was run collectively and had a strongly leftist editorial position. The Post printed news items and opinion pieces in roughly equal measure, with news pieces tending to be advocacy journalism. An early target of the paper was the use of undercover police officers in the Bloomington-Normal area to arrest non-violent drug offenders. The Post ran interviews with arrestees and editorials alleging police brutality and also exposed undercover officers by publishing photographs and sketches of them.

Initially published on a monthly schedule, decreasing numbers of volunteers led to a cutback to bi-monthly publication. The final two members of the collective decided to cease publication of the Post Amerikan in March 2004. Its 32-year publication history was the longest for an underground newspaper in the United States.

== Recurring features ==
- Community News - short news items and press releases covering events and activities in the community's leftist organizations
- Uppers 'n' Downers - blurbs offering "uppers" (praise) or "downers" (opprobrium) to anyone or anything that contributors wished
- Ask Ms. Hippie - tongue-in-cheek advice column
