= Andy Stewart (musician) =

Scottish singer (1933–1993)

Andy Stewart MBE
- Stewart in 1961

Background information
- Born: Andrew Stewart; 30 December 1933; Glasgow, Scotland
- Died: 11 October 1993 (aged 59) Arbroath, Scotland
- Genres: Comedy music Folk music
- Occupations: Singer; comedian; compere; impressionist
- Years active: 1955–1993
- Labels: EMI Top Rank; Capitol (North America)

Andrew Stewart MBE (30 December 1933 – 11 October 1993) was a Scottish singer and entertainer. He presented the BBC TV variety show The White Heather Club throughout the 1960s, and his song "Donald Where's Your Troosers?" was a hit in both 1960 and 1989. Internationally, the song most closely associated with Stewart is "A Scottish Soldier".

== Early life and education ==
Stewart was born in Glasgow, Scotland, in 1933, the son of a teacher. When he was five years old, the family moved to Perth and then, six years later, to Arbroath. Even in early childhood, he loved imitating people and amazed his parents with impersonations of famous singers and actors. He attended Arbroath High School, where his father taught science.

In 1950, at the age of 16, he participated in the Arbroath Abbey Pageant, taking the part of "A Knight in Shining Armour". Up until this time, he had not thought seriously about a career in entertainment, as he had aspirations of becoming a veterinary surgeon. He then decided to train as an actor at the Royal Scottish Academy of Music and Drama in Glasgow, where he studied until 1954. During his first year at the college, he obtained First Prize for Comedy; he also excelled in fencing, particularly at the foil.

== Career ==
Stewart's patriotic wearing of tartan and his use of stereotypical Scottish humour throughout the 1960s, echoed the music hall style and songs of fellow Scot Sir Harry Lauder.

Stewart himself attributed his "breakthrough" onto the international stage to the success of his "A Scottish Soldier" recording, which became a no. 1 hit in Canada, Australia and New Zealand, spent 40 weeks in the UK Singles Chart (1961), reached no. 69 on the US Billboard Hot 100 and also achieved hit status in South Africa and India. His other international hit singles included "Come in-Come in", "Donald Where's Your Troosers?", "Campbeltown Loch", "The Muckin' O' Geordie's Byre", "The Road to Dundee", "The Battle's O'er" (No. 1 on the Australian charts in July 1961), "Take Me Back", "Tunes of Glory", and "Dr. Finlay" (1965). He is also remembered for being the compere of The White Heather Club. This was a BBC Scotland television programme that existed as an annual New Year's Eve party (1957–1968), and also as a weekly early-evening series (1960–1968). At the height of its popularity, the show had a viewership of 10 million.

"Donald Where's Your Troosers?" was a hit in late 1960 and again when reissued in 1989. Stewart is said to have written the song in 10 minutes as he sat, minus trousers, in the lavatory of a recording studio. Stewart included an Elvis Presley impersonation halfway through the song. On the strength of this comedy hit, Stewart toured Australia and appeared on The Ed Sullivan Show in 1968, doing impersonations of Dean Martin. His skill with different accents is also evident on "The Rumour", where the rumour moves across Scotland and into Ireland, with Stewart speaking in a different accent for each place. Stewart's stage shows often included his impersonations of other famous singers, including Tom Jones, Billy Eckstine, Louis Armstrong, Dean Martin, Johnnie Ray, Elvis Presley, Petula Clark and Johnny Cash.

His albums, such as Scottish Soldier, The Best of Andy Stewart and Andy Stewart's Scotland, were also popular internationally. In 1973 he recorded a "live" album in Johannesburg, South Africa, entitled Andy Stewart in South Africa – White Heather Concert, which also featured accordionist Jimmy Blue, singers Alexander Morrison and Anna Desti and pianist Mark Simpson.

His international appeal was well-illustrated by his appearance at the 1964 New York World's Fair, attended by many thousands of people. From the early 1960s to the mid-1980s, he frequently and successfully toured Canada, the US, Australia and New Zealand. He appeared in concert throughout South Africa in 1968, 1971 and 1973. He also performed in Rhodesia (now Zimbabwe) as well as in Singapore and Hong Kong. Coming out of retirement in 1991, he began tours at home and abroad once again.

A prolific lyricist, he penned words to many traditional Scottish tunes, e.g. "Green Hills of Tyrol" (which he called "A Scottish Soldier"), "The Black Bear" ("Tunes of Glory"), and "The Battle is Over" ("The Battle's O'er"). He wrote his first lyric at the age of 14 (to a tune composed by his father) and called the song "My Hameland", which in 1969 (21 years later) became the title track of one of his albums.

Stewart took part in the 1961, 1962 and 1978 Royal Variety Performances and also appeared for the royal family at a Christmas party at Windsor Castle.

Scotch Corner, a Scottish television series (1972–1976) featured Andy Stewart and various guest singers and musicians. Some of the artists included in these broadcasts accompanied Stewart on his international White Heather concert tours during the 1970s. Andy's Party was another popular TV series on Grampian Television in the late 1970s.

He was the subject of This Is Your Life in 1975 when he was surprised by Eamonn Andrews.

From 1973 onward, recurrent ill-health took its toll on his voice and stage vitality. Frequently hospitalised in the 1970s and 1980s, he underwent several heart and stomach operations, including triple heart bypass surgery in 1976 and again in 1991.

== Retirement and death ==
In retirement, he moved back to Arbroath. "Donald Where's Your Troosers" was a surprise hit when reissued in late 1989. Marketed as a novelty song ideal for Christmas parties, it was actively promoted by BBC Radio One DJ Simon Mayo and reached number 4 on the UK Singles Chart. In response, Stewart provided a jingle for Mayo, "Simon, where's your troosers?".

Coming out of retirement in 1991, he began touring once again and recorded two CDs on the Scotdisc label. In 1993 a summer season at the Capitol Moat House Hotel in Edinburgh was cut short because of a back injury. A further long season for the following year was planned at the same venue. Shortly before he died in 1993, he gave a small concert at Arbroath High School for the pupils. He was also due to appear in The "Pride of the Clyde" at Glasgow's Pavilion Theatre and other tours and concerts were planned. A sheltered housing scheme in Arbroath, 'Andy Stewart Court', was named in his memory.

Stewart died the day after a performance at a Gala Benefit Concert for Children's Hospice Association Scotland (CHAS) at Usher Hall in Edinburgh. He suffered a fatal heart attack at his home. His funeral took place at St Andrew's Church (Church of Scotland) in Arbroath on Friday 15 October. His family were joined by many stars and friends from the entertainment world. A large crowd gathered outside the church to pay their respects to "The Tartan Trooper", while a piper played "The Green Hills Of Tyrol" (the bagpipe march on which "A Scottish Soldier" was based) and "The Battle's O'er".

== Awards and family ==
Stewart was awarded an MBE in 1976. He received the Freedom of Angus in 1987.

His son Ewan Stewart is an actor, whose film and television credits include Rob Roy, Titanic, Valhalla Rising, Only Fools and Horses and River City.

Stewart's grandson Harris Beattie played the title role of Billy Elliot in the eponymous West End production. In 2017 Harris won the prestigious Royal Academy of Dance Gold medal at the Genée International Ballet Competition and currently is a dancer with Northern Ballet based in Leeds. Another grandson, Alistair Beattie, toured internationally as a dancer in Matthew Bourne's, Swan Lake (2018-2020).

== Discography ==
=== Albums ===
==== Studio albums ====
Title	Details	UK
A Scottish Soldier	Released in 1961 by EMI	—
Andy Stewart	Released in 1961 by EMI	13
Andy Sings Songs of Scotland	Released in 1963 by EMI	—
Andy the Rhymer Comedy Verse	Released in 1963 by EMI	—
Campbeltown Loch	Released in 1965 by EMI	—
Tunes of Glory	Released in 1966 by EMI	—
I'm Off To Bonnie Scotland	Released in 1966 by EMI	—
Andy Stewart and his Friends of The White Heather Club	Released in 1967 by EMI	—
I Love To Wear The Kilt	Released in 1969 by EMI	—
Andy Stewart Sings Harry Lauder	Released in 1969 by EMI	—
My Hameland	Released in 1970 by EMI & Music for Pleasure	—
Here's Tae You!	Released in 1971 by EMI	—
Andy Stewart Invites You to Scotch Corner	Released in 1973 by EMI	—
Brand New From Andy (with Jimmy Blue and his Band)	Released in 1975 by PYE	—
Country Boy (with Anne Williamson)	Released in 1976 by PYE	—
Andy Stewart's Greatest Hits (with Jimmy Blue and his Band)	Released in 1976 by PYE	—
Scotland is Andy Stewart	Released in 1978 by EMERALD	—
Sing A Song of Scotland	Released in 1979 by Warwick	—
For Auld Lang Syne	Released in 31 December 1981 by EMERALD	—
Come In, Come In	Released in 1983 by LISMOR	—
Back to the Bothy	Released in 1987 by LISMOR	—
Andy Stewart's Scotland	Released in 1992 by Scotdisc	—
Friends of the White Heather Club	Released in 2013 by Vintage Masters Inc.	—
The Jolly Ploughboys	Released on 7 February 2014 by Marylebone	—

==== Compilation albums ====
Title	Details
The Best of Andy Stewart	Released in 1967 by EMI
The Very Best of Andy Stewart	Released in 1975 by EMI
Andy Stewart's Come In, Come In	Released in 1992 by BGS Productions Ltd
20 Scottish Favourites	Released in 1993 by EMI
Andy's Scottish Party	Released in 1995 by BGS Productions Ltd
20 Scottish Favourites (re-issue)	Released in 2001 by EMI
Andy Stewart, Forever In Song	Released in 2003 by Musicbank
Scottish Hits	Released on 3 February 2004 by Essential World Music
My Homeland	Released in 2009 by Music For Pleasure
Andy Stewart Scottish Songs	Released in 2010 by Pickwick Group Ltd
The Scottish Soldier	Released in 2012 by Pickwick Group Ltd
North of the Border	Released on 5 August 2013 by Marylebone

==== Live albums ====
Title	Details
Andy Stewart on Stage	Released in August 1967 by EMI
Andy Stewart in South Africa – White Heather Concert	Released in 1973 by EMI
Andy's Hogmanay Party	Released in 1977 by PYE
Andy's Party	Released in 1993 by Scotdisc

=== Extended plays ===
Title	Details	UK
Andy Sings	Released in May 1960 by Top Rank International	3
Andy Stewart Sings	Released in September 1961 by Top Rank International	12
Andy's Hits	Released in 1963 by His Master's Voice	—
Heather Bells	Released in January 1965 by His Master's Voice	—

=== Singles ===
==== 1960s ====
Title	Year	Peak chart positions					Album
Title	Year	UK	AUS	CAN	NZ	US	Album
"A Scottish Soldier"	1960	19	1	1	5	69	A Scottish Soldier, Andy Stewart Sings, & Andy's Hits
"Donald Where's Your Troosers?"	1960	37	4	1	—	77	Andy Stewart Sings
"The Muckin' O' Geordie's Byre"	1960	—	—	—	—	—	A Scottish Soldier & Andy Stewart Sings
"The Battle's O'er"	1961	28	6	—	—	—	Tunes of Glory & Andy's Hits
"The Road to Dundee"	1961	—	—	—	—	—	Non-album single
"Barren Rocks of Aden"	1962	—	—	—	—	—	Tunes of Glory
"Take Me Back"	1962	—	—	13	—	—	Non-album singles
"I've Never Kissed A Bonnie Lass Before"	1963	—	—	—	—	—	Non-album singles
"Campbeltown Loch"	1963	—	—	—	—	—	Campbeltown Loch & Tunes of Glory
"Tunes of Glory"	1964	—	—	—	—	—	Tunes of Glory
"Dr. Finlay"	1965	43	—	—	—	—	Non-album single
"Soldier Boy (The Sunset Call)"	1966	—	—	—	—	—	I'm Off To Bonnie Scotland
"The Gallant Forty-Twa"	1968	—	—	—	—	—	Non-album singles
"Rainbows Are Back in Style"	1969	—	—	—	—	—	Non-album singles

==== 1970s ====
1972 - "Farewell My Love"

1975 - "Song of Freedom"

1976 - "The Green Crystal Bag;" Album: I Love To Wear The Kilt

==== 1980s ====
Title	Year	UK	Album
"Mcginty's Meal and Ale"	1986	—	Back to the Bothy
"The Muckin' O' Geordie's Byre" (re-issue)	1986	—	A Scottish Soldier & Andy Stewart Sings
"Donald Where's Your Troosers?" (re-issue)	1989	4	Andy Stewart Sings

==== 2010s ====
2018 - "Donald Where's Your Troosers?" (re-issue); Album: Andy Stewart Sings

== DVDs ==
- Andy Stewart's Scotland (1992)
- Andy's Party (1993)
- Andy Stewart and the Scots Dragoon Guards (2010)

== See also ==
- Music of Scotland
- Royal Variety Performance
- List of British Music Hall musicians
- List of artists who reached number one on the Australian singles chart
- List of number-one singles in Australia during the 1960s
- List of Scottish musicians
