= Kimmo Nevonmaa =

Finnish composer

Kimmo Nevonmaa (May 10, 1960 – September 18, 1996) was a Finnish composer of contemporary music. Graduating from Kuopio Conservatory as a teacher of music theory in 1988, he continued his composition studies in Sibelius Academy.

Nevonmaa was born in Savonlinna, and received a diploma in composition in 1994. He was diagnosed with an incurable form of rheumatic fever at the age of 12; he later suffered from severe complications, and he died of a cerebral haemorrhage in Helsinki at the age of 36.

Despite his short career, Nevonmaa managed to create his own, unique style of composing. His main works include the String Quartet (1990), Dolor nascens et effluens for small orchestra (1992), and Lux intima for symphony orchestra (1994).
