= Saba, you rise from the ocean =

Regional anthem of Saba

- Regional anthem of Saba
- Lyrics: Christina Maria Jeurissen, 1960
- Music: Christina Maria Jeurissen, 1960
- Adopted: 1985/2010

Audio sample
- Band instrumental version: file; help

"Saba, you rise from the ocean" is the regional song of the Caribbean island Saba, a special municipality of the Netherlands. The anthem was written and composed by Christina Maria Jeurissen, a Dominican nun, in 1960. It was established by the Island Council on 6 December 1985 and officially ratified on 10 October 2010.

== Lyrics ==
English original

I
Saba, you rise from the ocean,
With Mountain and hillside so steep,
How can we reach you to greet you,
Isle of the sea, rough and deep.
Come, let us look at the rowers
with faces so placid and calm,
Guide us now safe through the breakers,
take us ashore without harm.

Chorus:
Saba, Oh Jewel most precious,
In the Caribbean sea.
Mem'ries will stay of thy beauty,
Though we may roam far from thee.

II
Saba, oh pearl of the ocean,
Friendly and lovely, though small,
Do not forget to be grateful,
To God the creator of all.
He in his goodness will guide you
and bless you in every part,
Making you always most precious
Saba, so dear to my heart.

Chorus

Dutch translation

I
Saba, u stijgt uit de oceaan,
Met Berg en helling zo steil,
Hoe kunnen wij u bereiken om u te begroeten,
Eiland van de zee, ruw en diep.
Kom, laat ons kijken naar de roeiers
met gezichten zo vredig en kalm,
Leid ons nu veilig door de branding,
neem ons aan wal zonder kwaad.

Refrein:
Saba, Oh meest kostbare Juweel,
In de Caraïbische zee.
Herinneringen van uw schoonheid zullen blijven,
Hoewel wij ver van u vandaan kunnen dwalen.

II
Saba, oh parel van de oceaan,
Vriendelijk en behaaglijk, hoewel klein,
Vergeet niet om dankbaar te zijn,
Voor God de schepper van alles.
Hij in zijn goedheid zal u leiden
en u zegenen in elke rol,
U altijd het meest kostbaar makend
Saba, zo dierbaar in mijn hart.

Refrein
