= Wolfram Schwinger =

German director, music writer and music critic

Walter Wolfram Schwinger (14 July 1928 – 17 February 2011) was a German director, music writer and music critic.

== Life and death ==
Born in Dresden, Schwinger was the scion of a family of theologians and had two brothers. He studied musicology in Berlin and worked as a journalist at the same time. He was particularly close to the conductors Erich and Carlos Kleiber.

In 1954 he was awarded his doctorate with a thesis on Hippolyte Chélard at the Humboldt University of Berlin. He also wrote a popular George Gershwin biography at the time. In 1960, he went to Hanover as a critic and in 1964 to Stuttgart.

As editor of the Stuttgarter Zeitung he wrote many articles. He later worked as a presenter of the morning Musikstunde at the SWDR. In 1979 his monograph on Krzysztof Penderecki was published (second edition in 1994).

As director he engaged Achim Freyer, Harry Kupfer, Axel Manthey, Giancarlo del Monaco, Jean-Pierre Ponnelle, Robert Wilson and Götz Friedrich.

Wolfgang Gönnenwein and Klaus Zehelein caused his departure in 1991. He then acted as artistic advisor to the Internationale Bachakademie Stuttgart.

Schwinger died in Stuttgart at the age of 82.
