= Donald Where's Your Troosers? =

- Cover of the 2011 Best Of album which included the song

Single by Andy Stewart

from the album A Scottish Soldier
- Released: 1960, 1989 (reissue)
- Genre: Comic song, Music of Scotland
- Length: 3:17
- Label: EMI Top Rank
- Songwriters: Andy Stewart, Neil Grant
- Producer: Robert Wilson

"Donald Where's Your Troosers?" is a comic song about a Scotsman who wears a kilt rather than trousers in daily life. It was written by Andy Stewart with music by Neil Grant. When performed by Andy Stewart and the White Heather Group, it was a hit in 1960, reaching number 37 in the UK Singles Chart, and number 1 in the Canadian CHUM Charts. When re-released in 1989, it became an even bigger hit, reaching number 4 in the UK.

Stewart wrote the song in 10 minutes while he sat, trouserless, in the lavatory of a recording studio. The song tells of a rustic Scotsman who wears the kilt in defiance of the shock this causes to polite society such as well-spoken ladies on the London Underground. The music supports the theme in its chord progression, which shifts from the double tonic of Scottish music to a V-i cadence more typical of highbrow music. As performed by Andy Stewart, a verse is also performed in the style of Elvis Presley to provide yet another amusing clash of cultures.

The re-release happened when BBC DJ Simon Mayo played the song on The Radio 1 Breakfast Show in November 1989 and then responded to listeners' requests for replays, "We were in the mood for novelty nonsense, so we kept playing it". Sonet Records then quickly arranged a deal with EMI to release the song on the Stone label as a Christmas single – a market in which novelty songs often did well. Mayo continued to give it much airplay and the song was number 4 in the UK Singles Chart at Christmas behind Jason Donovan's "When You Come Back to Me", Jive Bunny's "Let's Party" and Band Aid II's "Do They Know It's Christmas?". Stewart was not expecting this renewed success:

It was a great surprise to me. I was sittin' in the hoose one night and the phone rang. It was another record company, and he said "...they tell me you're aiming for number one at Christmas this year..." - I said: "You're joking?" and I quickly whipped out my diary to make sure it wisnae the 1st of April! It all just happened very suddenly, and very strangely. It's one of these things that happen in showbusiness

— Andy Stewart

The song was ranked 17th in a poll of the UK's favourite comic songs in 2009. It was performed as part of the opening ceremony for the 2014 Commonwealth Games.

== In popular culture ==
- One headline about the furore over allegations of Donald Duck being banned in Finland for not wearing trousers was "Donald, Where Are Your Trousers?"
- The song appeared as one of the options in a detour which contestants in The Amazing Race 33 were invited to perform.
- A slow and somber cover of the song is performed by the characters of John Henry (Garret Dillahunt) and Savannah Weaver (Mackenzie Brooke Smith) in the ending of the penultimate episode of the second season to the TV series Terminator: The Sarah Connor Chronicles.
- Variants of the song were sung by Scotland supporters at the 2026 Football World Cup.
