= Movements for Piano and Orchestra =

1959 composition by Igor Stravinsky

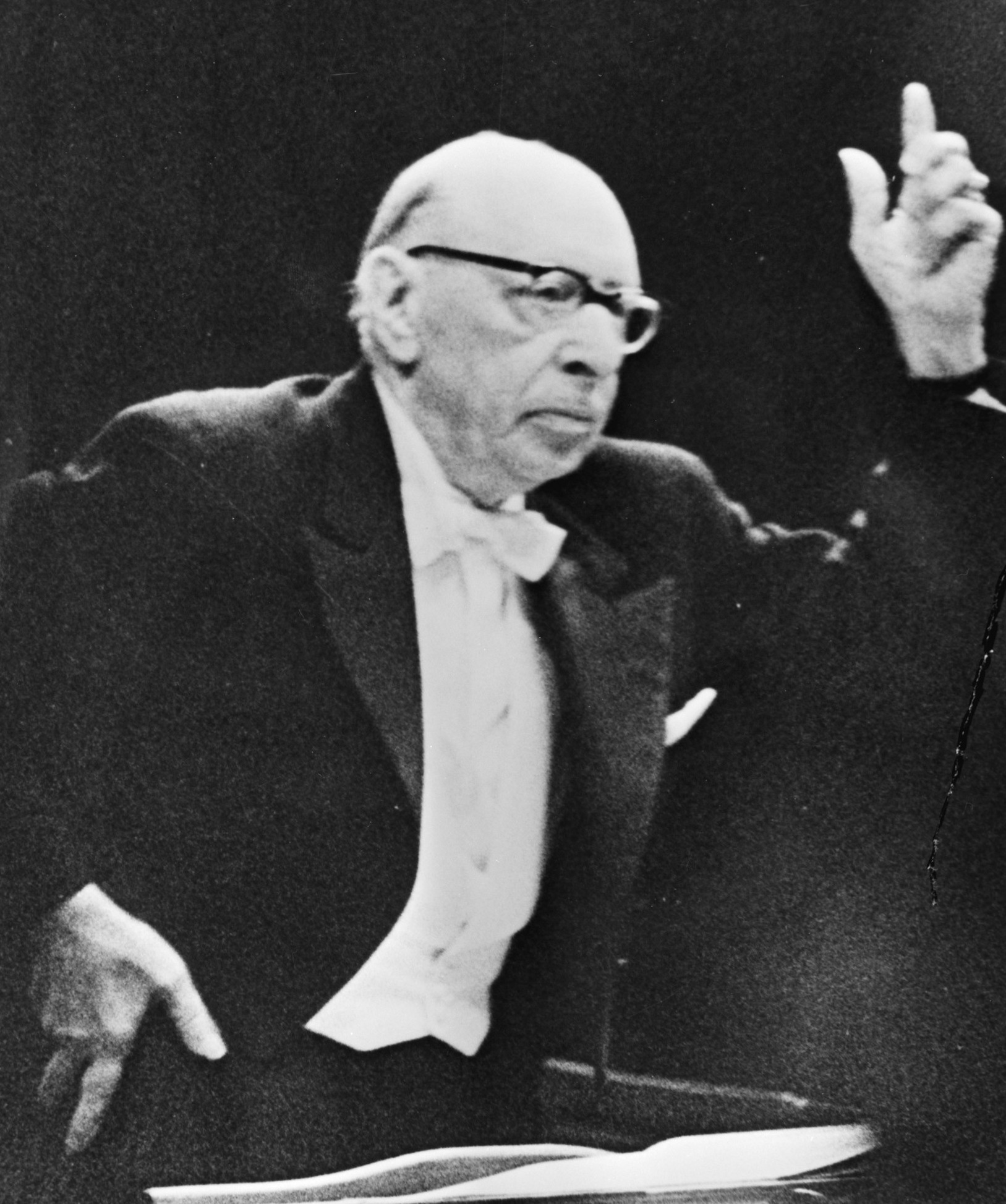
Stravinsky conducting in 1965

Movements is a 1959 five-movement work for piano and orchestra by Igor Stravinsky lasting about ten minutes. It was written during his serial period and shows his dedication to that idiom as well as the influence of Anton Webern.

The piece is scored for 2 flutes (2nd doubling piccolo), oboe, English horn, clarinet, bass clarinet, bassoon, 2 trumpets, 3 trombones, harp, celesta, strings and solo piano.

== Commission and Premiere ==
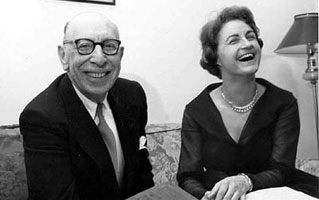
Igor Stravinsky and Margrit Weber discussing Movements, in January 1960.

Stravinsky wrote Movements for pianist Margrit Weber, who premiered it at a Stravinsky Festival in New York's Town Hall on January 10, 1960, with the composer conducting. It was commissioned for $15,000 by Swiss industrialist Karl Weber, Margrit Weber's husband. Weber had asked for a work of between 15 and 20 minutes in length, but Stravinsky initially produced a compressed piece lasting barely half as long. According to a diary entry by biographer/assistant Robert Craft, in response to a letter received from the Webers (17 April 1959) Stravinsky said "I think I will have to add another minute or two of music," to which Vera replied "So much for 'all-encompassing conceptions of form.' The artist simply makes it up as he goes along."

== Analysis ==
Stravinsky breaks the orchestra down into chamber-sized sections with the piano acting as a pivot between these, creating the type of subtle and gestural textures favored by Webern in his Concerto for Nine Instruments (Op. 24) and Variations for Orchestra (Op. 30), the latter a work much admired by Stravinsky.

The highly constructed nature of the twelve-tone idiom he uses draws all its thematic material from one tone-row, which the piano gives in one non-linear gesture right at the opening: E♭ F♭ B♭ A♭ A♮ D C B♮ C♯ F♯ G and F♮.

As it turns out, this tone-row will be presented complete only a couple of times. Mostly it is broken into small bits and served in slightly varied orderings. The technique of Klangfarbenmelodie can thus clearly be heard, particularly in the opening of the piece, whose gestural phrase mimics that of Webern's Op. 24.

Stravinsky himself described the harmonic structure of Movements as "anti-tonal". Traditional references to triadic harmonic structures are banished in favor of a near-total line-based idiom, and conventional ostinati and harmonic considerations are replaced by an atonal contrapuntal texture characterized by gestures, inner unity, and adherence to serial forms more pervasive than before in Stravinsky's career.
