= Thierry Pastor =

French singer and composer (born 1960)

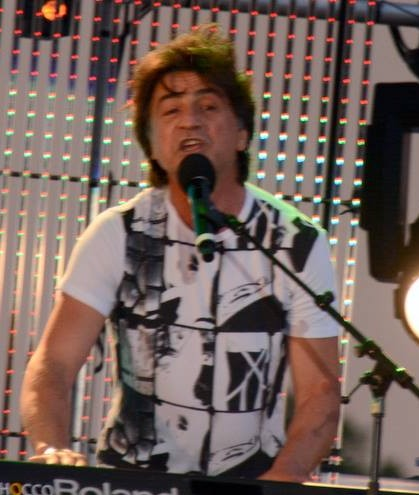
- Thierry Pastor in 2013

Background information
- Born: Thierry Pastor; 4 March 1960 (age 65); French Algeria
- Origin: France
- Genres: Pop
- Occupation(s): Singer, composer
- Years active: 1981–1993

Thierry Pastor (born 4 March 1960) is a French singer and composer known for his 1980s hits "Le Coup de folie" and "Sur des Musiques Noires" (#12 in France). He was also a former musician of Gilbert Montagné and his first single was produced by Roland Magdane.

== Discography ==
=== Albums ===
- 1982 : Le Grand Show
- 1988 : Avec elle
- 1992 : Des Histoires
- 1993 : Passé composé
- 1999 : Coup de folie (best of)

=== Singles ===
- 1981 : "Le Coup de Folie"
- 1982 : "Where Is My Love"
- 1983 : "Magic Music"
- 1985 : "Sur des Musiques Noires" – #12 in France
- 1986 : "Équateur"
- 1987 : "Dernier Matin d'Asie" (charity single recorded by Sampan)
- 1988 : "T'en vas pas"
- 1989 : "Mister T"
