= Art Paul Schlosser =

American singer-songwriter

- Born: Arthur Paul Schlosser; January 4, 1960 (age 65); Chicago, Illinois, U.S.
- Occupation(s): Artist, cartoonist, comedian, journalist, musician, poet, singer-songwriter

Arthur Paul Schlosser (born January 4, 1960) is an American artist, cartoonist, comedian, journalist, musician, poet, singer, and songwriter based in Madison, Wisconsin. He plays humorous novelty, gospel, and political songs and draws cartoons currently for the Madison Street Pulse newspaper, where he also submits poems and interviews people. Schlosser also paints and has participated in various art projects.

Schlosser was named Arthur after his father and grandfather but his grandfather might have originally been named Otto but because of his German accent when he said his name they thought he said Arthur.

== Childhood ==
Schlosser was born in Chicago and grew up listening to novelty musicians like Allen Sherman and Tiny Tim, as well as funny songs by The Beatles and The Monkees. When he was 11, he, his mother, and his sisters moved to Madison, Wisconsin, after his parents got a divorce. As a child in Madison, his mother continued to play weird and funny songs for him, sometimes playing strange sound effects on one recorded player to go with the songs. As a teenager, Schlosser joined a work experience play group that encouraged him to be creative. In this group, there were a couple of fans of The Beatles, one of whom encouraged Schlosser to write lyrics. It was from that time on that Schlosser started to write. He would listen to the Dr Demento radio show as well as other strange records that he discovered at the local library, and then try to write some lyrics he was inspired to write after listening to the songs. Also as a child he was encouraged to draw cartoons by his sister Mary.

== State Street ==
Upon discovering that it is legal to busk on State Street, Schlosser tried it out on a warm day late in February 1986 and received a couple of dollars for his effort. Since then Schlosser has been a street musician and busker as well as an outsider artist on State Street in Madison, Wisconsin.

He usually performs his original songs or parodies on an acoustic guitar and kazoo. He also sometimes plays electronic keyboard or ukulele.

He is best known for his comedy music, especially "Have A Peanut Butter Sandwich", which made the Funny Five of the Dr Demento radio show four times in 2001, and "Vote for Me/It's a Joke" which was on the Funny Five of the Dr Demento radio in 2003. While he sings mostly humorous songs, Schlosser has also written on the topics of politics and religion.

In 2007, Schlosser received a Madison Area Music Award (MAMA) for best compilation for his CD Art Paul Schlosser {The Tribute}. In 2009, he won two more Madison Area Music Awards for Unique Song ("Have A Peanut Butter Sandwich," the remix version, which was remixed by Animalien) and for Unique Album (Leftovers).

== Appearances ==
His music has been played on oddball radio programs, including Greasy Kid Stuff, The Mad Music Hour, Dave's Gone By and the Dr. Demento Show, and he has appeared on his own public-access television show as well as WGN-TV news.

- On April 1, 1994, Schlosser perform with Horace Pinker and Jawbreaker (band) at the Beloit Sports Arena
- On July 30, 2009, Stephen Colbert mentioned Schlosser on the Colbert Report, in order to emphasize that any artist can get their songs on iTunes, no matter what the quality of their work may be.
- On June 27, 2010, Schlosser appeared on the internet radio show The Bastard Den on Infernal Rock Radio at www.infernalrockradio.com. Schlosser performed a few of his original songs and gave a 15-minute interview.
- On June 29, 2010, Schlosser appeared on America's Got Talent appearing under the name Buddy Holly Cheesehead, singing "Eating Cheese." He was X off the show by the three judges.
- On July 30, 2016, Schlosser appeared on Bordello of Horror being interviewed and playing 3-6 Headed.
- On October 23, 2019, The Tonight Show with Jimmy Fallon played Schlosser's song "Have a Peanut Butter Sandwich" as part of the reoccurring bit of songs to "Do Not Play".

== Discography ==
- My Cat Was Taking A Bath & Dead Skunk Perfume plus 23 other songs (1992)
- All the songs from Happy Birthday & Smile Be Happy (1993)
- I Want To Be Madonna ? & Greene plus 41 other songs and jokes (1994)
- I'm A Prince by the Artist Still Known as Art Paul Schlosser (1996)
- Be My Valentine (1997)
- Reinventing Myself (2000)
- They Won't Play This on the Country Western Radio (2001)
- Smile You're on Kandid Kamera (2002)
- The Best of Art Paul Schlosser (2003)
- Art Paul Schlosser Live at the Hog (2003)
- Vote for Me/It's a Joke (2003)
- Art Paul Schlosser & Friends Live at Club De Wash plus the 3 songs at Bob's Apartment Experiment (2003)
- Do You Want To Walk on Water (2003)
- Words of Cheese & Other Parrot Tree (2003)
- The ABCs of Art Paul Schlosser's World (2003)
- Art Paul Schlosser {The Tribute!} by various artist (2006)
- Warning: Listening To This CD could be dangerous to your health (2007)
- It Takes A Whole World by Art Paul Schlosser & Jim Anderson (2007)
- Untitled I & II (2007)
- The Best of Art Paul Schlosser {The Sequel} (2007)
- Scum Always Rises at the Top (2007)
- Songs I forgot that the Elephant Remembered (2007)
- Art Paul Schlosser & Robin Good Our Tribute To Shari Elf
- Art Paul Schlosser living in a Materialistic World
- Songs I Recorded On The Telephone (2008)
- February Album Writing Month (2008)
- Art Paul Schlosser {The Remix Project} by Various Artists (2008)
- Leftovers (2008)
- Art Paul Schlosser Live at MarsCon 2007 & 2008 (2009)
- Let's Be Friends (2009)
- U're The Best (2009)
- Monster (2010)
- If I Was Governor? (2011)
- Live on the Snake (2011)
- Show Me You're Crazy Legs Art Paul Schlosser with David Labedz(2012)
- The Treasure (2013)
- Live 2: On The Snake (WSUM) (2013)
- Something Old, Something New, Something Borrowed & Something Blue Live on WORT 89.9 fm (2013)
- I Bet U've Got a Smile (2013)
- I Want 2 C Your Smile (2014)
- Songs I Recorded At the Library (2015)
- New Experiments in Music (2016)
- Our Song May Not Be Your Thing with Chris Kammer as The Schlosser-Kammer Project (2016)
- Songs I Recorded at the Library (2016)
- We Duet Right by Art Paul Schlosser & Friends(2017)
- Eye Want 2 Bee Viral (2018) *Cartoons by Schlosser & Polar Lay (2019)
- Art Paul Live Doing His Best (2020)
- For Piano Lovers (2020)
- Santa Claus Ran Out Of Coal So He Gave You This CD (Some of Art Paul's Best terrible Xmas Songs) (2020)
- I Wrote The Lyrics (2021)
- The ArtcaPaula Project by Various Artist (2021)
- 67 songs in less than 67 Minutes (2021)
- Have a Better Day (2022)
- The X Y Zs of Art Paul Schlosser (2023)

== Sources ==
- Art Paul Schlosser – Inside Outsider
