= Mikuláš Škuta =

Slovak pianist and composer

Mikuláš Škuta or Miki Skuta (born 3 January 1960) is a Slovak pianist and composer.

== Life ==
Škuta was born on 3 January 1960 in Komárno. He was trained at the Bratislava Conservatory, completing studies in Paris under Claude Helffer. Škuta, a prize-winner at several Czechoslovak and international competitions, was awarded a 3rd prize at the 1983 Maria Callas competition in Athens. He has been active as a concert pianist in Europe.

A free-lance pianist, since the late 80s he has grown involved with jazz and contemporary music.
