= Billy Garland =

American musician (1918–1960)

William Jefferson Garland (June 17, 1918 – March 16, 1960), was an American blues guitarist, singer, and songwriter. Garland was famous for his falsetto singing combined with a gentle guitar playing style. Much of Garland's output was recorded from 1940 until 1950, including 1945's "Got Nothing on Me".

Garland was born in Flowood, Mississippi, and died in 1960 in a car accident in Chicago.

He is not the same Billy Garland (born Mulberry, Arkansas; who released a country music CD in 2002) and who was inducted into the Rockabilly Hall of Fame.
