= String Quartet No. 7 (Shostakovich) =

1960 string quartet by Dmitri Shostakovich

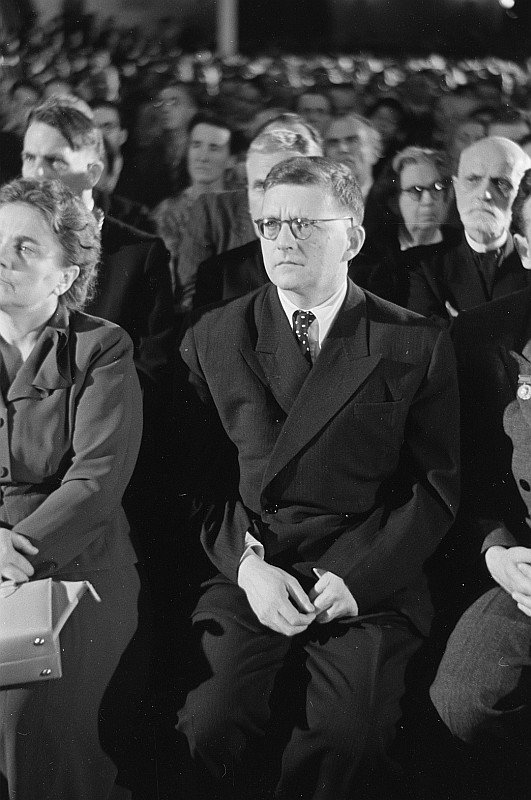
Dmitri Shostakovich in 1950

Dmitri Shostakovich began work on his String Quartet No. 7 in F♯ minor, Op. 108, in May 1959 and completed it in March 1960. He dedicated it to the memory of his first wife Nina Vassilyevna Varzar, who died in December 1954. This piece was composed in the year that would have marked her 50th birthday. This quartet was premiered in Leningrad Glinka Concert Hall by the Beethoven Quartet on May 15, 1960.

Shostakovich wrote many chamber music works; as a result, he founded his characteristic approach to chamber music quite early in his career. Of his many chamber works, the String Quartet No. 7 is Shostakovich's shortest string quartet, with a duration of 13 minutes. The work has a four-movement structure. However the "fourth" movement is not considered as a separate movement, therefore the piece counts as a three-movement work. This quartet also has no break in between movements with the attacca in between all movements that Shostakovich notated.

== Music ==
=== I. Allegretto ===
The first movement begins with a descending line by the first violin that emphasizes the key of F♯ minor as the central of tonality in this movement. The thematic material then gets an answer from a cello with three eight-notes. The counterpoint in this movement can be described as a conversation of two opposite characters starts at the beginning of the movement. In the opening, there are two distinct character through the rhythmic pattern. The first violin has two sixteenth-notes followed by an eight-note while the cello answer it with straight three eight notes in the lower register. The melodic material in the first violin always starts on F♯ until m. 39, when Shostakovich begins it on A♭.

The secondary theme (mm. 46), it introduces a new three eight-notes thematic material on cello. Instead of focusing on F♯ minor, Shostakovich shifted the attention to E♭ minor. Later on, the first violin also has the thematic material in the higher register. In this second theme, the second violin and viola have steady sixteenth-notes throughout the entire section. The recapitulation begins in mm. 106 with the recomposition of the first theme through pizzicato and straight eight-notes. The recapitulation also brings back the F♯ minor tonality again. In addition, Shostakovich also put the second theme in the recapitulation as well with unstable harmony. The coda restores the metric instability in the exposition. The movement ends in the major with one last espressivo on cello.

=== II. Lento ===
The second movement begins with four standalone measures of four-string arpeggiation on the second violin, an accompanimental figure which appears throughout the movement. The first violin enters at measure 5 in its high register; the viola and cello enter in m. 14 with a glissando and hold steady notes. In this movement, Shostakovich lightens the textures in comparison to the outer movements and indicates that the performers use mutes on their instruments.

=== III. Allegro – Allegretto ===
The third movement opens fff, marking a contrast with previous movement. In measure 12, the viola introduces the theme, which also becomes the subject of a fugue throughout all four instruments. This "Allegro" section ends with pizzicato on cello.

The "Allegretto" section that follows is waltz-like in character. The section starts with the first violin introducing a new theme answered by the other instruments. Throughout the movement, the theme from the first movement recurs in-between statements of the "Allegretto" theme. The quartet ends with cello pizzicato leading to an F♯ major triad.
