= Young Emotions =

Single by Ricky Nelson
- B-side: "Right by My Side"
- Released: April 11, 1960
- Genre: Ballad
- Length: 2:30
- Label: Imperial
- Songwriters: Jerry Livingston, Mack David

Ricky Nelson singles chronology
"I Wanna Be Loved" / "Mighty Good" (1959)	"Young Emotions" (1960)	"I'm Not Afraid" / "Yes Sir, That's My Baby" (1960)

"Young Emotions" is a song written by Jerry Livingston and Mack David and performed by Ricky Nelson. The song reached No. 12 on the Billboard Hot 100, No. 28 on the R&B chart, and No. 48 on the UK Singles Chart in 1960. The single's B-side, "Right by My Side", reached No. 59 on the Billboard Hot 100.

The song is ranked No. 85 on Billboard magazine's Top 100 Songs of 1960.
