= Milton Yakus =

American songwriter (1917–1980)

- Born: Milton Yakus; December 25, 1917; Boston, Massachusetts, U.S.
- Died: November 6, 1980 (aged 62) Boston, Massachusetts, U.S.
- Occupations: Composer; record producer

Milton Yakus (December 25, 1917 – November 6, 1980) was an American songwriter and producer of popular music. He is best known as the writer of the Patti Page hits "Go On with the Wedding" and "Old Cape Cod" in the mid-1950s.

== Early life ==
Milton was born in 1917. He trained in audio engineering in the U.S. Navy.

== Career ==
Milton began as an independent writer, producer and engineer for WMEX (AM), Boston and various New York stations. In 1946, Milton with his younger brother Herbert Yakus founded Ace Recording Studios in Boston, Massachusetts, the premiere recording studio in New England. The studio produced hits by artists such the G-Clefs ("Ka-Ding Dong" in 1955) and Freddy Cannon ("Tallahassee Lassie" in 1959) both from Boston.

He wrote the hits "Go on with the Wedding" (1956) and "Old Cape Cod" (1957) that were recorded by Patti Page.

Ace closed in 1980 due to urban renewal. Milton died four months later at an early age of sixty-two.

== Personal life ==
He was married to Martha Gold. Their son Shelly Yakus, was born in 1945, and became a recording engineer. His other sons, Bernie and Joey also had careers in the music business.
