= Jan and Dean discography =

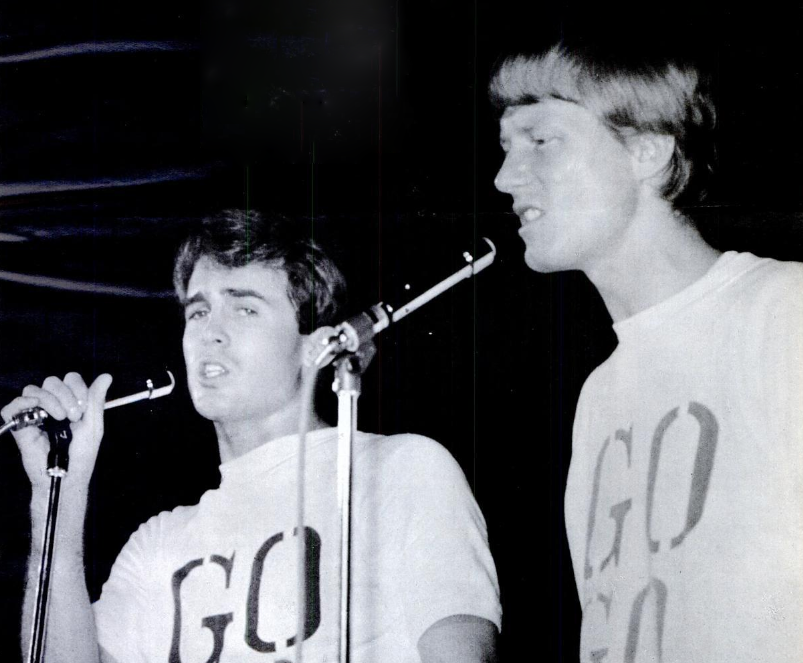
- Jan and Dean circa 1965
- Studio albums: 14
- Live albums: 2
- Singles: 47

This is the discography for American rock duo Jan and Dean.

== Albums ==
=== Studio albums ===
Title	Album details	Peak chart positions	
Title	Album details	US Billboard	US Cashbox
The Jan & Dean Sound	Released: March 1960; Label: Doré (101)	—N/a (Note: The Billboard 200 was first published in August 1963.)	—
Jan & Dean Take Linda Surfin'	Released: April 1963; Label: Liberty (LRP-3294 / LST-7294)	92	—
Surf City and Other Swingin' Cities	Released: July 1963; Label: Liberty (LRP-3314 / LST-7314)	32	21
Drag City	Released: November 1963; Label: Liberty (LRP-3339 / LST-7339)	22	17
Dead Man's Curve / The New Girl in School	Released: April 1964; Label: Liberty (LRP-3361 / LST-7361)	80	42
Ride the Wild Surf	Released: August 1964; Label: Liberty (LRP-3368 / LST-7368)	66	26
The Little Old Lady from Pasadena	Released: September 1964; Label: Liberty (LRP-3377 / LST-7377)	40	40
Folk 'n Roll	Released: November 1965; Label: Liberty (LRP-3431 / LST-7431)	145	87
Jan & Dean Meet Batman Last album released before Jan's car accident	Released: March 1966; Label: Liberty (LRP-3444 / LST-7444)	—	—
Filet of Soul: A "Live" One	Released: April 1966; Label: Liberty (LRP-3441 / LST-7441)	127	—
Save for a Rainy Day	Cancelled 1966 album; Released: 1996 by Sundazed (SC 11035)	—	—
Carnival of Sound	Cancelled 1968 album; Released: 2010 by Rhino (RHM1 521997 / RHM2 521476)	—	—
Port to Paradise	Released: 1986; Label: J&D Records (PTP-111)	—	—
Filet Of Soul Redux: The Rejected Master Recordings	Released: 2017; Label: Omnivore Recordings (OVCD226)	—	—

=== Live albums ===
Title	Album details	Peak chart positions	
Title	Album details	US Billboard	US Cashbox
Command Performance - Live in Person	Released: January 1965; Label: Liberty (LRP-3403 / LST-7403)	33	42
One Summer Night / Live	Released: November 1982; Label: Rhino (RNDA 1498)	—	—

=== Select compilation albums ===
Title	Album details	Peak chart positions			
Title	Album details	US Billboard	US Cashbox	NL	UK
Jan & Dean's Golden Hits	Released: August 1962; Label: Liberty (LRP-3248 / LST-7248)	—N/a	—	—	—
Jan & Dean Golden Hits Volume 2	Released: September 9, 1965; Label: Liberty (LRP-3417 / LST-7417)	107	71	—	—
Popsicle	Released: June 1966; Label: Liberty (LRP-3458 / LST-7458)	—	—	—	—
Jan & Dean Golden Hits, Volume Three	Released: August 1966; Label: Liberty (LRP-3460 / LST-7460)	—	—	—	—
Jan & Dean Anthology Album	Released: November 1971; Label: United Artists (UAS-9961)	—	—	—	—
Jan & Dean - Stars of The 60s	Released: 1973; Label: United Artists (5C 050-94587)	—	—	7	—
Gotta Take That One Last Ride	Released: October 1974; Label: United Artists (UA-LA341-H2 0798)	—	—	—	—
Deadman's Curve	Released: 1979; Label: Liberty (LN-10011)	—	—	—	—
The Jan and Dean Story	Released: 1980; Label: K-tel (NE 1084)	—	—	—	67

=== Solo albums ===
Jan Berry album

- Second Wave—One Way 34524 (1997)
  A Memorial edition of this CD was released in April 2004, after Jan's death

Dean Torrence solo projects

- Rock 'N' Roll City—Realistic – 51-3009 (1983)
  Released for Radio Shack as "Mike & Dean" for Mike Love from the Beach Boys and Dean Torrence from Jan & Dean
- Anthology: Legendary Masked Surfer Unmasked—Varèse Sarabande 3020663492 (2002)
- The Bamboo Trading Company - From Kitty Hawk To Surf City—Steelsurf 10221 (2013)
- The Teammates— Omnivore (2022)

== Singles ==
Jan & Arnie singles

A-side/B-side	Year	Label & number	Peak chart positions					Album
A-side/B-side	Year	Label & number	US	US R&B	US CB	AUS	CAN	Album
"Jennie Lee" b/w "Gotta Getta Date"	1958	Arwin 108	8	4	3	40	2	Non-album tracks
"Gas Money" b/w "Bonnie Lou"	1958	Arwin 111	81	-	-	-	-	Non-album tracks
"The Beat That Can't Be Beat" b/w "I Love Linda"	1958	Arwin 113	-	-	-	-	-	Non-album tracks
"Jennie Lee" b/w "Gotta Getta Date"	1960	Dot 16116	-	-	-	-	-	Non-album tracks

Jan & Dean singles

A-side/B-side Both sides from same album except where indicated	Year	Label & number	Peak chart positions						Album
A-side/B-side Both sides from same album except where indicated	Year	Label & number	US	US Hot R&B Singles	US CB	AUS	CAN	UK	Album
"Baby Talk" b/w "Jeanette, Get Your Hair Done"; First pressings shown as by "Jan & Arnie"	1959	Dore 522	10	28	7	45	8	-	The Jan & Dean Sound
"There's A Girl" b/w "My Heart Sings"	1959	Dore 531	97	-	80	-	-	-	The Jan & Dean Sound
"Clementine" b/w "You're On My Mind"	1959	Dore 539	65	-	88	-	-	-	The Jan & Dean Sound
"White Tennis Sneakers" b/w "Cindy"	1960	Dore 548	-	-	-	-	-	-	The Jan & Dean Sound
"We Go Together" b/w "Rosie Lane" (from Jan & Dean)	1960	Dore 555	53	-	39	-	-	-	Jan & Dean's Golden Hits
"Gee" b/w "Such a Good Night for Dreaming"	1960	Dore 576	81	-	119	-	-	-	Non-album tracks
"Judy's an Angel" b/w "Baggy Pants"	1961	Dore 583	-	-	-	-	-	-	Non-album tracks
"Julie" b/w "Don't Fly Away"	1961	Dore 610	-	-	-	-	-	-	Jan & Dean
"Heart and Soul" b/w "Those Words" (First pressings), "Midsummer Night's Dream" (later pressings); Both B-sides are non-album tracks	1961	Challenge 9111	25	-	16	63	13	24	Jan & Dean's Golden Hits
"Wanted, One Girl" b/w "Something a Little Bit Different"	1961	Challenge 9120	104	-	130	-	-	-	Non-album tracks
"A Sunday Kind of Love" b/w "Poor Little Puppet"	1961	Liberty 55397	95	-	109	-	-	-	Jan & Dean's Golden Hits
"Tennessee" b/w "Your Heart Has Changed Its Mind" (Non-album track)	1962	Liberty 55454	69	-	83	-	35	-	Jan & Dean's Golden Hits
"My Favorite Dream" b/w "Who Put the Bomp" (from Jan & Dean's Golden Hits)	1962	Liberty 55496	-	-	-	-	-	-	Non-album tracks
"Frosty the Snowman" b/w "She's Still Talkin' Baby Talk"	1962	Liberty 55522	-	-	-	-	-	-	Non-album tracks
"Linda" b/w "When I Learn How to Cry"	1963	Liberty 55531	28	-	26	89	-	-	Jan & Dean Take Linda Surfin'
"Surf City" b/w "She's My Summer Girl" (from Popsicle)	1963	Liberty 55580	1	3	1	1	2	26	Surf City and Other Swingin' Cities
"Honolulu Lulu" b/w "Someday (You'll Go Walking By)" (Non-album track)	1963	Liberty 55613	11	-	10	18	25	-	Surf City and Other Swingin' Cities
"Drag City" b/w "Schlock Rod (Part 1)"	1963	Liberty 55641	10	-	10	34	13	-	Drag City
"Dead Man's Curve"/ "The New Girl in School"	1964	Liberty 55672	8; 37	-	9; 26	41	39	-	Dead Man's Curve/The New Girl in School
"The Little Old Lady (from Pasadena)" b/w "My Mighty G.T.O." (from Dead Man's Curve/The New Girl in School)	1964	Liberty 55704	3	-	5	56	1	-	The Little Old Lady from Pasadena
"Ride the Wild Surf"/ "The Anaheim, Azusa & Cucamonga Sewing Circle, Book Review & Timing Association" (from The Little Old Lady from Pasadena)	1964	Liberty 55724	16; 77	-	23; 50	24	11; 31	-	Ride the Wild Surf
"Sidewalk Surfin'" b/w "When It's Over" (from The Little Old Lady from Pasadena)	1964	Liberty 55727	25	-	28	54	12	-	Ride the Wild Surf
"(Here They Come) From All Over the World" b/w "Freeway Flyer" (Non-album track)	1965	Liberty 55766	56	-	50; 114	-	9	-	Command Performance/Live in Person
"You Really Know How to Hurt a Guy" b/w "It's as Easy as 1, 2, 3" (from Dead Man's Curve/The New Girl In School)	1965	Liberty 55792	27	-	42	-	7	-	Jan & Dean Golden Hits, Volume 2
"It's a Shame to Say Goodbye" b/w "The Submarine Races" (from Ride the Wild Surf); Cancelled single	1965	Liberty 55816	-	-	-	-	-	-	Folk 'n Roll
"I Found a Girl" b/w "It's a Shame to Say Goodbye"	1965	Liberty 55833	30	-	39	62	2	-	Folk 'n Roll
"A Beginning from an End" b/w "Folk City"	1965	Liberty 55849	109	-	110	-	22	-	Folk 'n Roll
"Norwegian Wood" b/w "I Can't Wait to Love You" (from Folk 'n Roll); Cancelled single	1966	Liberty 55856	-	-	-	-	-	-	Filet of Soul: A "Live" One
"Batman!" b/w "Bucket T" (from Dead Man's Curve/The New Girl in School); Last single released before Jan's car accident	1966	Liberty 55860	66	-	60	-	13	-	Jan & Dean Meet Batman
"Popsicle" b/w "Norwegian Wood" (from Filet of Soul: A "Live" One)	1966	Liberty 55886	21	-	24	-	3	-	Popsicle
"Fiddle Around" b/w "A Surfer's Dream" (from Ride the Wild Surf)	1966	Liberty 55905	93	-	73	-	71	-	Non-album track
"School Day (Ring! Ring! Goes the Bell)" b/w "The New Girl in School"	1966	Liberty 55923	-	-	-	-	71	-	Dead Man's Curve/The New Girl in School
"Summertime, Summertime" b/w "California Lullaby"	1966	J & D Record Co. 001 (July); Magic Lamp 401 (August); J & D Record Co. 401 (August)	-	-	-	-	-	-	Non-album tracks
"Like a Summer Rain" b/w "Louisiana Man" (from Carnival of Sound, cancelled)	1966	J & D Record Co. 402	-	-	-	-	-	-	Save for a Rainy Day (cancelled)
"Yellow Balloon" b/w "Taste of Rain"	1967	Columbia 44036	111	-	116	-	-	-	Save for a Rainy Day (cancelled)
"Hawaii" b/w "Tijuana" (Non-album track)	1967	Jan & Dean 10	-	-	-	-	-	-	Carnival of Sound (Cancelled)
"Fan Tan" b/w "Love and Hate"	1967	Jan & Dean 11	-	-	-	-	-	-	Carnival of Sound (Cancelled)
"Vegetables" b/w "Snow Flakes on Laughing Gravy's Whiskers"; Shown as by "The Laughing Gravy"	1967	White Whale 261	-	-	-	-	-	-	Non-album tracks
"Only a Boy" b/w "Love and Hate"	1967	Warner Bros. 7151	-	-	-	-	-	-	Carnival of Sound (Cancelled)
"I Know My Mind" b/w "Laurel and Hardy"	1968	Warner Bros. 7219	-	-	-	-	-	-	Carnival of Sound (Cancelled)
"Girl, You're Blowing My Mind" b/w "In The Still of the Night"; Cancelled single	1968	Warner Bros. 7240	-	-	-	-	-	-	Carnival of Sound (Cancelled)
"Jennie Lee" b/w "Vegetables"	1972	United Artists 50859	-	-	-	-	-	-	Jan & Dean Anthology
"Gonna Hustle You" b/w "Summertime, Summertime"; Shown as by "The Legendary Masked Surfers"	1973	United Artists 50958	-	-	-	-	-	-	Non-album tracks
"Summer Means Fun" b/w "Gonna Hustle You"; Shown as by "The Legendary Masked Surfers"	1973	United Artists 270	-	-	-	-	-	-	Non-album tracks
"Fun City" b/w "Totally Wild"	1975	Ode 66111	-	-	-	-	-	-	Non-album tracks
"Sidewalk Surfin'" b/w "Gonna Hustle You"	1976	United Artists 670	107	-	119	-	-	-	Non-album tracks
"Ocean Park Angel" b/w "Blue Moon"; Cancelled single	1982	-	-	-	-	-	-	-	Non-album tracks
"Oh What a Beautiful Morning" b/w "Wa Ishi Nichi Shiow"	1987	Encore Studio	-	-	-	-	-	-	Non-album tracks

=== Solo singles ===
Jan Berry singles

- "Tomorrow's Teardrops"/"My Midsummer Night's Dream"—Ripple 6101 (1960)
  Shown as "Jan Barry"
- "Universal Coward"/"I Can't Wait To Love You"—Liberty 55845 (1965)
  Both tracks from the Jan & Dean album Folk 'n Roll (all other tracks from this list are non-album)
- "Mother Earth"/"Blue Moon Shuffle"—Ode 66023 (1972)
  Jan's first post-accident lead vocal release
- "Blue Moon Shuffle" b/w "Don't You Just Know It" (with Brian Wilson) — Ode 66034 (1973)
- "Tinsel Town (Hitch-a-Ride to Hollywood)"/"Blow Up Music"—Ode 66050 (1974)
- "Sing Sang a Song" b/w "Sing Sang a Song" (Singalong version) -- Ode 66120 (1976)
- "Little Queenie"/"That's the Way It Is"—A&M 1957 (1977)
- "Skateboard Surfin' USA"/"How-How I Love Her"—A&M 2020 (1978)
- "Rock City"/"Its Gotta Be True"—JB (cassette single) (1984)

Dean Torrence related singles

- 1965: "Summertime, Summertime"/"Theme from Leon's Garage"—Brer Bird 001
  Released as "Our Gang" featuring Dean and Gary Zekley
- 1982: "Be True to Your Bud" b/w "Be True to Your Bud" (Instrumental) (with Mike Love; credited as Mike & Dean)
- 1982: "Da Doo Ron Ron" b/w “Baby Talk"—Hitbound Records – HR-101A
  (both with Mike Love; credited as Mike & Dean) Single form their Radio Shack LP album
- 1983: "Jingle Bell Rock" b/w "Let's Party" (both with Mike Love; credited as Mike & Dean)
- 1983: "Jingle Bells" by Paul Revere & the Raiders b/w "Jingle Bell Rock" (with Mike Love; credited as Mike & Dean)
- The Bamboo Trading Company digital EP — "Shrewd Awakening" [lead vocal with Katie & Jillian Torrence]/"Tonga Hut" [intro and backing vocal] (January 21, 2014)
- The Bamboo Trading Company digital EP — "Star Of The Beach" [lead vocal]/"Drinkin' In The Sunshine" [backing vocal]/"Tweet (Don't Talk Anymore)" [lead vocal] (July 4, 2014)

== Reissues ==
Liberty All-Time Hit Series reissues

- "Surf City" / "Honolulu Lulu"—54534
- "Dead Man's Curve" / "Drag City"—54544
- "The Little Old Lady From Pasadena" / "The New Girl In School"—54546
- "You Really Know How To Hurt A Guy" / "It's As Easy As 1,2,3"—54549
- "Batman" / "Popsicle"—54554

United Artists Silver Spotlight Series reissues

All released January 1973

- "Jennie Lee" / "Baby Talk"—XW089
  A-side is a re-recorded version of the Jan & Arnie hit, featured on Jan & Dean's Golden Hits
- "Surf City" / "Ride The Wild Surf"—XW091
- "Dead Man's Curve" / "Drag City"—XW092
- "Honolulu Lulu" / "Sidewalk Surfin'"—XW093
- "The Little Old Lady From Pasadena" / "Popsicle"—XW094

Collectables (CEMA Special Markets) reissues

All released 1993

- "Linda" / "The New Girl In School"—COL 6182
- "Honolulu Lulu" / "Sidewalk Surfin"—COL 6183
- "Popsicle" / "(Here They Come) From All Over The World"—COL 618
