= The Little Old Lady from Pasadena (album) =

Studio album by Jan and Dean
- Released: September 1964
- Genre: Pop rock
- Length: 26:50
- Label: Liberty
- Producer: Jan Berry for Screen Gems, Inc.

Jan and Dean chronology
Ride the Wild Surf (1964)	The Little Old Lady from Pasadena (1964)	Command Performance/Live in Person (1965)

Singles from The Little Old Lady from Pasadena
- 1. "The Little Old Lady (from Pasadena)" Released: June 8, 1964; 2. "The Anaheim, Azusa & Cucamonga Sewing Circle, Book Review and Timing Association" Released: August 26, 1964; 3. "Sidewalk Surfin'" / "When It's Over" Released: October 9, 1964; 4. "It's As Easy as 1, 2, 3" Released: April 16, 1965

Professional ratings
Review scores
Source	Rating
AllMusic	2.5/5 stars

The Little Old Lady from Pasadena is a studio album by Jan and Dean. It was released by Liberty Records in September 1964.

== Background ==
"The Little Old Lady (from Pasadena)" was released as a single on June 8, 1964. The single reached number 3 on the Billboard Hot 100.

On June 15, 1964, Screen Gems and its music publishing division Screen Gems-Columbia Music filed a lawsuit against Lou Adler, Jan Berry, Dean Torrence, and numerous other parties, including Liberty Records, Liberty Records Sales Corporation, Trousdale Music Publishers and Dunhill Productions, for numerous contractual violations. Among the causes of action listed in the lawsuit included Berry stealing master tapes of songs controlled by Screen Gems, (Note: In April 1964, Berry had "absconded" with the master tapes for "Mr. Chan", which was later retitled "Old Ladies Seldom Power Shift", and other songs, which had been stored at United Recording. Recording engineer Bones Howe later confirmed that the theft had occurred.) as well as Berry violating his exclusive songwriting contract by publishing several songs through other companies. When the lawsuit was settled in July of that year, Screen Gems acquired all rights to "The Little Old Lady", "It's As Easy As 1, 2, 3" and "Move Out Little Mustang", among several other songs Berry had contributed to as writer. Berry also gave up "any and all rights or claims he may have had" to the disputed songs. Liberty were obliged to release Jan and Dean's Ride the Wild Surf as the duo's next album as a result of the settlement. Work on the Ride the Wild Surf and The Little Old Lady from Pasadena albums sometimes took place during the same sessions.

"It's As Easy as 1, 2, 3", performed by Berry with Jill Gibson, was originally released on the Dead Man's Curve/The New Girl in School album. "Sidewalk Surfin'" previously appeared on the Ride the Wild Surf album.

== Songs ==
"Memphis" was previously recorded by Jan and Dean for the album Surf City and Other Swingin' Cities. The duo recorded an "updated" version of the song for The Little Old Lady from Pasadena. "When It's Over" was co-written by Don Altfeld's father Horace, who ran the Jan and Dean Fan Club. Horace provided lyrics, while Jill Gibson wrote the music. Gibson recalled that Don Altfeld was not involved in the writing of the song. The track "Horace, the Swingin' School-Bus Driver" was also named for Horace Altfeld.

The instrumental "Old Ladies Seldom Power Shift" was originally titled "Mr. Chan". The track was retitled "Bucket Seats", and was released as the B-side of Rally-Packs' single "Move Out Little Mustang", also produced by Berry, on Liberty's sister label Imperial in April 1964. Although Berry wrote the instrumental, Don Altfeld received writing credit on the single. When the track, now retitled "Old Ladies Seldom Power Shift" was released on Jan and Dean's The Little Old Lady from Pasadena album, it was credited to Berry and Dean Torrence, who received credit for the new title. Torrence said, "Jan went with an instrumental and gave me writer's credit on it because I came up with the title. We were going to try and write a song about it, but we ran out of time."

The title of "The Anaheim, Azusa & Cucamonga Sewing Circle, Book Review and Timing Association" was partially inspired by a running gag on The Jack Benny Program. Part of the song's melody was inspired by the German Christmas carol "Lobt Gott, ihr Christen alle gleich". "Move Out Little Mustang" was originally recorded by P.F. Sloan and Steve Barri as Rally-Packs. Berry arranged, produced, and sang bass vocals on the song. The Rally-Packs' recording was repurposed for The Little Old Lady From Pasadena album as a Jan and Dean track. "Summer Means Fun" was also recorded by Sloan and Barri as the Fantastic Baggys. The Jan and Dean version reused the group's backing track and harmony vocals. "Skateboarding - Part 2" is the follow-up to "Skateboarding - Part 1" on the Ride the Wild Surf album. Jan and Dean's cover of "One-Piece Topless Bathing Suit", previously recorded by Bruce and Terry, modified the song's lyrics to be about a grandmother wearing the bathing suit.

== Artwork ==
Kathryn Minner, who played the role of an old lady driving a stock Dodge in local commercials for Dodge Dealers, appeared on the album cover with Jan and Dean. According to Torrence, the album cover was taken in front of the Studio Five photo studio building. Torrence also helped with the sleeve design, noting "I told the art department to bend the text around the cover ... instead of breaking it up and putting it on separate lines."

== Release and reception ==
In September 1964, Liberty Records released The Little Old Lady from Pasadena in mono and stereo. The album charted at number 40 in both the Billboard Top LPs and Cash Box Top 100 Albums charts.

In 1992, EMI Records USA reissued the album on CD as a two-fer with Ride the Wild Surf, with an alternate take of "The Little Old Lady (from Pasadena)" included as a bonus track. In 1996, One Way Records reissued The Little Old Lady from Pasadena on CD as a two-fer with Filet of Soul: A "Live" One.

Billboard's review stated, "Jan and Dean display the best surfing tradition in this album", and noted the title track, "Memphis", and "Anaheim, Azusa & Cucamonga" as the album's "[s]trongest cuts". Cash Box praised Jan and Dean's "imaginative brand of singing and musicianship" on the album, and highlighted "Memphis", "Sidewalk Surfin'" and "One-Piece Topless Bathing Suit" as examples. Stephen Cook of AllMusic wrote that the album "will please both fans hooked on the group's harmonious innocence [sic] and those looking for a little more in the way of Phil Spector-like studio savvy."

== Track listing ==
Side one
No.	Title	Writer(s)	Length
1.	"The Little Old Lady (from Pasadena)"	Jan Berry; Don Altfeld; Roger Christian	2:27
2.	"Memphis"	Chuck Berry	2:29
3.	"When It's Over"	Jill Gibson; Altfeld; Horace Altfeld	2:15
4.	"Horace, the Swingin' School-Bus Driver"	Phil Sloan; Steve Barri	2:22
5.	"Old Ladies Seldom Power Shift"	Berry; Dean Torrence	1:50
6.	"Sidewalk Surfin'"	Brian Wilson; Christian	2:25
Total length:			13:48

Side two
No.	Title	Writer(s)	Length
1.	"The Anaheim, Azusa & Cucamonga Sewing Circle, Book Review and Timing Association"	Berry; Christian; Altfeld	2:23
2.	"Summer Means Fun"	Sloan; Barri	1:57
3.	"It's As Easy As 1, 2, 3"	Gibson; Altfeld	2:23
4.	"Move Out Little Mustang"	Berry; Wilson; Christian	1:44
5.	"Skateboarding - Part 2"	Berry; Gibson	2:10
6.	"One-Piece Topless Bathing Suit"	Sloan; Barri; Altfeld	2:25
Total length:			13:02 26:50

== Personnel ==
Per Mark A. Moore.

- The Fantastic Baggys (Phil Sloan, Steve Barri) - additional vocalists
- Jill Gibson - vocals (9), spoken vocal (10)

Technical

- Jan Berry - arranger, producer
- Bones Howe - engineer
- Lanky Linstrot - engineer
- Chuck Britz - engineer
- Hal Blaine - conductor
- Studio Five - cover design and photography
- "Little Old Grandpa" - liner notes

== Charts ==
Chart performance for "The Little Old Lady from Pasadena"
Chart (1964)	Peak position
US Billboard Top LPs	40
US Cash Box Top 100 Albums	40
