= Dead Man's Curve / The New Girl in School =

Dead Man's Curve/The New Girl in School

Studio album by Jan and Dean
- Released: April 1964
- Length: 30:08
- Label: Liberty
- Producer: Jan Berry for Screen Gems, Inc.

Jan and Dean chronology
Drag City (1963)	Dead Man's Curve/The New Girl in School (1964)	Ride the Wild Surf (1964)

Singles from Dead Man's Curve / The New Girl in School
- 1. "Dead Man's Curve" / "The New Girl in School" Released: February 7, 1964; 2. "My Mighty G.T.O." Released: June 8, 1964; 3. "It's As Easy as 1, 2, 3" Released: April 1965; 4. "Bucket "T"" Released: January 19, 1966; 5. "School Day (Ring! Ring! Goes the Bell)" Released: October 14, 1966

Dead Man's Curve/The New Girl in School is a studio album by surf duo Jan and Dean. It was released by Liberty Records in April 1964.

== Background ==
In November 1963, "Dead Man's Curve" was originally released on the Drag City album. Jan Berry continued work on the track after it was released. On February 7, 1964, "Dead Man's Curve" was released as a single, with "The New Girl in School" as the B-side. "Dead Man's Curve" charted at number eight on the Billboard Hot 100, while "The New Girl in School" reached number 37.

Berry attempted to circumvent his exclusive songwriting contract with Screen Gems by omitting his writing credits from "Bucket "T"", "Rockin' Little Roadster", "My Mighty G.T.O.", "Barons, West L.A.", and "Hey Little Freshman". All five songs, as well as "It's As Easy as 1, 2, 3" and several other compositions, were copyrighted by Brinkley Music Co., a fictitious entity. (Note: Other titles copyrighted by Brinkley Music Co. included "When It's Over" and "Move Out Little Mustang", which was copyrighted by Trousdale Music and Brinkley Music.) The original copyright registration for "Barons, West L.A." listed Don Altfeld as writer, although Berry had written the song himself. Berry had planned to "eventually assign [the songs] to Lou Adler's Trousdale Music Publishing". Adler managed Jan and Dean.

On June 15, 1964, Screen Gems and its music publishing division, Screen Gems-Columbia Music, sued Adler, Berry, Dean Torrence, Jill Gibson, Altfeld, Roger Christian, Bobby Roberts, Pierre Cossette, Gene Weed, Alvin S. Bennett, Liberty Records, Liberty Records Sales Corporation, Trousdale Music Publishers, and Dunhill Productions, citing numerous contractual and copyright violations, as well as "violation of fiduciary duties, conversion, unfair competition and conspiracy". Among the disputed songs included in the lawsuit (Note: Other songs listed in the lawsuit included "Hey There, It's Yogi Bear" (written by David Gates), "The Little Old Lady (from Pasadena)", "Move Out Little Mustang", and "Bucket Seats".) were the six titles included on the Dead Man's Curve/The New Girl in School album. Screen Gems also asserted that Berry was involved in writing "It's As Easy as 1, 2, 3", although Jill Gibson later stated that she had co-written the song with Altfeld. In a court disposition, Gene Kaye, general manager of Screen Gems-Columbia Music, testified that Weed had written the lyrics to "My Mighty G.T.O." and requested Berry compose the song's music. After Kaye passed the lyrics to Adler, "who was at the time employed by Screen Gems", Kaye stated that Adler published the song with Trousdale Music, and credited Altfeld, Gibson and Christian as co-writers of the song alongside Weed. When the lawsuit was settled in July of that year, Screen Gems acquired all rights to the disputed compositions from Trousdale Music, and Berry was required to give up all claim to the songs, including any writing credits.

== Songs ==
Jan and Dean's cover of "Linda" was previously released on the album Jan and Dean Take Linda Surfin'. "My Mighty G.T.O." was originally titled "Go-Go-Go" and was copyrighted as "Go, Go, Go, Mighty G.T.O.". "It's As Easy as 1, 2, 3" is a duet performed by Berry and Jill Gibson, who was Berry's girlfriend at the time. In August 1964, Gibson also released her own version of the song as a single on Liberty's sister label Imperial. The single reused the backing track from Jan and Dean's version with modified lyrics. The working title for "Hey Little Freshman" was "Little School Girl".

== Release and reception ==
In April 1964, Liberty Records released the Dead Man's Curve/The New Girl in School album in mono and stereo. Liberty's official records specify April 14 as the album's release date, although Mark A. Moore notes that the dates specified "are sometimes at odds with certain session dates". On May 16 of that year, Billboard listed the album in its New Album Releases section. However, a Billboard article from a few months later regarding the Screen Gems lawsuit indicated that the album was released in April. The album reached number 80 on the Billboard Top LPs chart, and number 42 on the Cash Box Top 100 Albums chart.

Cash Box wrote that the album's title tracks "should stir up plenty of sales excitement for this package". Matt Dennis of The Windsor Star called the album "a sure bet for entertainment at any summer party". In the 1993 book The Roots & Rhythm Guide to Rock, an unidentified reviewer highlighted "Bucket "T"" as the "critic's choice, with its great stuttering chorus". The reviewer also praised Hal Blaine's work as conductor on the album.

=== Singles ===
On June 8, 1964, "My Mighty G.T.O." was released as the B-side of "The Little Old Lady (from Pasadena)". In April 1965, "It's As Easy as 1, 2, 3" was released as the B-side of "You Really Know How to Hurt a Guy". On January 19, 1966, "Bucket "T"" was released as the B-side of "Batman!"

On October 14, 1966, "The New Girl in School" was reissued with "School Day" as the B-side, retitled "School Day (Ring! Ring! Goes the Bell)". It was the final Jan and Dean single released on Liberty, as the duo's contract with the label had expired earlier that year. "School Day" reached number 71 in Canada.

== Track listing ==
Writing credits per Mark A. Moore. Track lengths per stereo LP.

Side one: Car Side
No.	Title	Writer(s)	Length
1.	"Dead Man's Curve"	Jan Berry; Roger Christian; Brian Wilson; Artie Kornfeld	2:35
2.	"Three Window Coupe"	Berry; Christian	2:11
3.	"Bucket "T""	Berry; Christian; Don Altfeld	2:17
4.	"Rockin' Little Roadster"	Berry; Christian; Altfeld	2:17
5.	""B" Gas Rickshaw"	Berry	2:32
6.	"My Mighty G.T.O."	Berry; Gene Weed; Jill Gibson; Christian	2:37
Total length:			14:29

Side two: School Side
No.	Title	Writer(s)	Length
1.	"The New Girl in School"	Berry; Wilson; Christian; Bob Norman	2:37
2.	"Linda"	Jack Lawrence	2:26
3.	"Barons, West L.A."	Berry	2:55
4.	"School Day"	Chuck Berry	2:33
5.	"It's As Easy as 1, 2, 3"	Gibson; Altfeld	2:24
6.	"Hey Little Freshman"	Berry; Christian; Altfeld	2:43
Total length:			15:39 30:08

Notes

- Jan Berry was originally uncredited as writer on "Bucket "T"", "Rockin' Little Roadster", "My Mighty G.T.O.", "Barons, West L.A.", and "Hey Little Freshman". His writing credits were restored in 2002.

== Charts ==
Chart performance for "Dead Man's Curve/The New Girl in School"
Chart (1964)	Peak position
US Billboard Top LPs	80
US Cash Box Top 100 Albums	42
