= Ride the Wild Surf (album) =

Studio album by Jan and Dean
- Released: August 15, 1964
- Genre: Pop rock
- Length: 27:51
- Label: Liberty
- Producer: Jan Berry for Screen Gems, Inc.

Jan and Dean chronology
Dead Man's Curve / The New Girl in School (1964)	Ride the Wild Surf (1964)	The Little Old Lady from Pasadena (1964)

Singles from Ride the Wild Surf
- 1. "She's My Summer Girl" Released: May 17, 1963; 2. "Ride the Wild Surf" Released: August 26, 1964; 3. "Sidewalk Surfin'" Released: October 9, 1964; 4. "A Surfer's Dream" Released: July 29, 1966

Professional ratings
Review scores
Source	Rating
AllMusic	2/5 stars

Ride the Wild Surf is a studio album by Jan and Dean. It was released by Liberty Records in August 1964. Although it was released as a tie-in album to the film Ride the Wild Surf and included the duo's title track, it is not a soundtrack album to the film.

== Songs ==
Jan and Dean's version of "Tell 'Em I'm Surfin'" reused the backing track and harmony vocals from the Fantastic Baggys' version of the song. Dean Torrence said, "We were going to school full time, so if somebody came in with a song that was 70% done ... and we liked it ... and it fit thematically ... what the hell, why not?"

"She's My Summer Girl" was originally released as the B-side of the "Surf City" single in May 1963.

"The Restless Surfer" was a reworking of Gary Zekley's 1963 single "Other Towns, Other Girls", which Torrence co-produced. "The Restless Surfer" reused the song's original backing track with modified lyrics.

"Skateboarding – Part 1" adapted a motif from the song "Frère Jacques". Berry had released the track as a single in June 1964, titled "Skateboarding" and credited to the Sidewalk Surfers, without authorization from Screen Gems.

An alternate version of "Walk on the Wet Side" was released as the B-side of the Sidewalk Surfers' "Skateboarding" as "Shoot the Curb".

== Release ==
On August 15, 1964, Liberty Records released the Ride the Wild Surf album in mono and stereo. The album reached number 66 on the Billboard Top LPs chart.

In 1996, One Way Records reissued the album on CD as a two-fer with Jan & Dean Take Linda Surfin'.

=== Singles ===
On August 26, 1964, "Ride the Wild Surf" was released as a single. It reached number 16 on the Billboard Hot 100. On October 9, "Sidewalk Surfin'" was released as a single, peaking at number 25 on the Billboard Hot 100.

On July 29, 1966, "A Surfer's Dream" was released as the B-side of the non-album single "Fiddle Around".

== Critical reception ==
Cash Box wrote that the duo "seem sure to score heavily in the coin dept." with the album. Bruce Eder of AllMusic described the album as "fairly uneven", but called it "a fun, if not a very substantial way to spend 20-some minutes".

== Track listing ==
Side one
No.	Title	Writer(s)	Length
1.	"Ride the Wild Surf"	Jan Berry; Roger Christian; Brian Wilson	2:20
2.	"Tell 'Em I'm Surfin'"	Phil Sloan; Steve Barri	2:00
3.	"Waimea Bay"	Jill Gibson; Don Altfeld; Berry; Christian	2:44
4.	"She's My Summer Girl"	Altfeld; Berry; Wilson	2:59
5.	"The Restless Surfer"	Gary Zekley	2:14
6.	"Skateboarding – Part 1"	Berry; Gibson	2:08
Total length:			14:25

Side two
No.	Title	Writer(s)	Length
1.	"Sidewalk Surfin'"	Berry; Christian	2:15
2.	"Surfin' Wild"	Berry; Christian; Wilson	2:14
3.	"Down at Malibu Beach"	Berry; Christian; Altfeld	2:10
4.	"A Surfer's Dream"	Gibson; Altfeld	2:27
5.	"Walk on the Wet Side"	Berry; Gibson	2:12
6.	"The Submarine Races"	Berry; Christian	2:08
Total length:			13:26 27:51

== Personnel ==
Per Mark A. Moore.

- The Fantastic Baggys (Phil Sloan, Steve Barri) – additional vocalists

Technical

- Jan Berry – arranger, producer
- Bones Howe – engineer
- Lanky Linstrot – engineer
- Chuck Britz – engineer
- Hal Blaine – conductor
- Studio Five – cover design and photography
- Shelley Fabares – liner notes

== Charts ==
Chart performance for Ride the Wild Surf
Chart (1964)	Peak position
US Billboard Top LPs	66
US Cash Box Top 100 Albums	26
