= Filet of Soul: A "Live" One =

1966 live album by Jan and Dean

Live album with studio tracks by Jan and Dean
- Released: April 25, 1966
- Recorded: 1963–March 9, 1966
- Venues: Hullabaloo Night Club, Hollywood, California (December 11–12, 1965)
- Studios: Western; United (Note: Tracking for "Dead Man's Curve".); Wally Heider Studios
- Genre: Pop rock
- Length: 30:25
- Label: Liberty
- Producer: Jan Berry for Screen Gems, Inc.

Jan and Dean chronology
Jan & Dean Meet Batman (1966)	Filet of Soul: A "Live" One (1966)	Popsicle (1966)

Singles from Filet of Soul: A "Live" One
- 1. "Norwegian Wood (This Bird Has Flown)" Released: May 3, 1966

Professional ratings
Review scores
Source	Rating
AllMusic	2.5/5 stars

Filet of Soul: A "Live" One is an album by Jan and Dean. It was released by Liberty Records on April 25, 1966.

== Recording ==
The live tracks were recorded on December 11 and 12, 1965 at the newly opened Hullabaloo Night Club. Jan and Dean were backed by members of the Wrecking Crew. Two full concerts were recorded, although not all songs were used on the album. Songs performed during the concerts, but not featured on the album include versions of "A Taste of Honey", "The Brave Bulls", "Surf City", "I Get Around", "The Little Old Lady from Pasadena", "Dead Man's Curve", "A Beginning from an End", "Cathy's Clown", "The Lonely Bull", and "Yesterday".

On December 18, an unspecified session for a version of "Norwegian Wood (This Bird Has Flown)" took place at Wally Heider Studios. A sweetening session for Jan & Dean, Live from the Hullabaloo in Hollywood took place the following day. An unspecified session for "Hang On" was held on December 26. On January 4, 1966, additional sweetening work on the Hullabaloo Night Club recordings took place at Western Recorders. Sweetening sessions for "Norwegian Wood" took place on March 5, 6 and 9.

In the 2026 book All Summer Long: Conversations with The Beach Boys from Surfin' to SMiLE, Dean Torrence recalled the impetus for the title of the album:

About the same time The Beatles had released Rubber Soul, and all the copycats came along, [mockingly] then we all have to have a "soul" record! The Righteous Brothers did Blue Eyed Soul, and then everybody had to have a soul record. When we were looking at that we started thinking, if we were to do a "soul" record, what was the soul of Jan & Dean? Filet of Soul, of course [laughing]!

— Dean Torrence

The original version of the Filet of Soul album was more humor-oriented and featured overdubbed sound effects and background music. Torrence recalled Liberty rejecting two versions of the album assembled by Jan Berry. Berry was not involved with the final release, which was prepared by Dave Pell. On March 25, an album master for Filet of Soul was assembled at TTG Studios with a track listing similar to that of the final release. The live version of "Norwegian Wood" included on the assembly was later replaced with a studio version, while "Cathy's Clown" was dropped and replaced with "Gonna Hustle You", which had been recorded in 1963 and later rewritten as "The New Girl in School". The final master was assembled on April 4 at TTG.

== Release ==
Liberty released Filet of Soul: A "Live" One in mono and stereo on April 25, 1966, almost two weeks after Jan Berry's near-fatal car accident on April 12. The mono release of the album featured the live version of "Norwegian Wood (This Bird Has Flown)" and an alternate studio version of "Dead Man's Curve", whereas the stereo release featured a studio version of "Norwegian Wood" and the original studio version of "Dead Man's Curve" from the Drag City album. The album peaked at number 127 on the Billboard Top LPs chart. Selections from the original version of the album were released in 1971 on side four of Jan & Dean Anthology Album. Torrence said, "I thought that putting out pieces of an un-released record, that had been deep-sixed by a previous record company because it was too weird, was really interesting.

"Norwegian Wood" was released as the only single from the album on May 3, with "Popsicle" from the Drag City album as the B-side. The single was set for release in January with "I Can't Wait to Love You" as the B-side, but Berry decided to focus on other projects. Liberty released "Norwegian Wood" as a single after repeated urging from Berry's legal team, but instead promoted "Popsicle". Both tracks appeared on the Jan and Dean compilation album Popsicle in June.

The original UK release of the album dropped A "Live" One from the title and contained a completely different track listing, but retained the front and back cover designs.

In 1996, One Way Records re-released Filet of Soul as a two-fer with the duo's The Little Old Lady from Pasadena album on CD.

== Critical reception ==
Cash Box gave Filet of Soul a positive review, which stated "Fans of the pair should find hour upon hour of listening thrills packed into this offering. Watch for quick sales reaction." Billboard described the album as "another sure-shot LP for the teen dance set." In a retrospective review, Bruce Eder of AllMusic wrote that the album was not "a landmark of any kind, but like almost every other Jan & Dean record ever issued, it is lots of fun". John Bush's AllMusic review of the album stated, "Though Jan & Dean['s] versions of "Norwegian Wood", "Lightnin' Strikes", and "Hang on Sloopy" are all fine and good, the brass section completely overpowers their thin, reedy voices on the choruses of the more powerful songs."

== Track listing ==
Track runtimes sourced from the mono release of the album.

Side one
No.	Title	Writer(s)	Length
1.	"Norwegian Wood (This Bird Has Flown)"	John Lennon; Paul McCartney	2:00
2.	"1-2-3"	John Madara; David White; Leonard Borisoff	2:12
3.	"Lightnin' Strikes"	Lou Christie; Twyla Herbert	3:08
4.	"You've Got to Hide Your Love Away"	Lennon; McCartney	2:06
5.	"Let's Hang On"	Bob Crewe; Sandy Linzer; Denny Randell	3:03
6.	"Hang On Sloopy (My Girl Sloopy)"	Bert Russell; Wes Farrell	2:58
Total length:			15:27

Side two
No.	Title	Writer(s)	Length
1.	"Honolulu Lulu"	Jan Berry; Lou Adler	2:12
2.	"Gonna Hustle You"	Berry; Brian Wilson	2:37
3.	"Dead Man's Curve"	Berry; Christian; Artie Kornfeld; Wilson	2:25
4.	"Michelle"	Lennon; McCartney	2:33
5.	"I Found a Girl"	P.F. Sloan; Steve Barri	2:40
6.	"Everybody Loves a Clown"	Thomas Lesslie; Leon Russell; Gary Lewis	2:31
Total length:			14:58 30:25

== Filet of Soul Redux: The Rejected Master Recordings ==
Filet of Soul Redux: The Rejected Master Recordings

Live album by Jan and Dean
- Released: September 1, 2017
- Recorded: December 11–12, 1965
- Venues: Hullabaloo Night Club, Hollywood, California
- Length: 35:12
- Label: Omnivore Recordings
- Producers: Jan Berry, Dean Torrence

Jan and Dean chronology
Carnival of Sound (2009)	Filet of Soul Redux: The Rejected Master Recordings (2017)

On September 1, 2017, Omnivore Recordings released Filet of Soul Redux: The Rejected Master Recordings, which included the original version of the album.

=== Reception ===
Jeff Burger gave a negative review of Filet of Soul Redux, calling it "so light, it floats away, and much of it simply isn't listenable. [...] The result is a record that ranks close to the two I often cite as the worst of the rock era, Lou Reed's Metal Machine Music and Wild Man Fischer's Wildmania."

=== Track listing ===
Filet of Soul Redux: The Rejected Master Recordings track listing
No.	Title	Writer(s)	Length
1.	"Prelude / Honolulu Lulu"	Jan Berry; Lou Adler; Roger Christian	2:25
2.	"Boys Down at the Plant / Cathy's Clown"	Phil Everly; Don Everly	5:23
3.	"Brass Section Introductions / Dead Man's Curve"	Artie Kornfeld; Brian Wilson; Berry; Christian	3:42
4.	"Beatle Part of Our Portion / Rhythm Section Introductions / Michelle / Whistling Dixie"	Paul McCartney	6:15
5.	"We Want Jan & Dean / Norwegian Wood (This Bird Has Flown)"	McCartney	3:16
6.	"1-2-3"	Len Barry; David White; John Madara; Lamont Dozier; Brian Holland; Eddie Holland	2:14
7.	"Lightnin' Strikes"	Lou Christie; Twyla Herbert	3:41
8.	"You've Got to Hide Your Love Away"	John Lennon; McCartney	2:06
9.	"And Now Back to the Show / Let's Hang On Introduction"	Bob Crewe; Denny Randell; Sandy Linzer	2:47
10.	"Hang On Sloopy / Jan & Dean, They'll Be Back"	Bert Berns; Wes Farrell	3:23
Total length:			35:12

=== Notes ===
- John Lennon is not credited as writer on Apple Music for "Norwegian Wood (This Bird Has Flown)" or "Michelle".
- Len Barry is credited twice on "1-2-3" under his stage name and as L. Borisoff on Apple Music.

== Personnel ==
Known credits per Mark A. Moore.

- Jan Berry – vocals
- Dean Torrence – vocals

Additional musicians

- Hal Blaine – drums (1–7, 10–12), (8), (9), contractor (9)
- Chuck Britz – (1)
- Gary Coleman – percussion and assorted (1–7, 10–12)
- Don Peake – guitar (1–7, 10–12)
- Ray Pohlman – bass (1–7, 10–12), (8), (9)
- Tommy Tedesco – 12-string guitar (1–7, 10–12), (9)
- Lou Blackburn – middle trombone (1–7, 10–12)
- Bud Brisbois – trumpet (1–7, 10–12)
- Jim Horn – saxophone (1–7, 10–12)
- Plas Johnson – saxophone (1–7, 10–12)
- Henry Lewy – (1)
- Lew McCreary – bass trombone (1–7, 10–12)
- Jay Migliori – saxophone (1–7, 10–12)
- Ollie Michell – lead trumpet (1–7, 10–12)
- Tony Terran – trumpet (1–7, 10–12)
- Julius Wechter – (1)
- Dave Wells – third trombone (1–7, 10–12)
- Glen Campbell – (8), (9)
- Earl Palmer – (8)
- Bill Pitman – (8), (9)
- Don Randi – (8)
- Billy Strange – (8)
- Jimmy Bond – (9)
- Russell Bridges – (9)
- Al DeLory – (9)
- Steve Douglas – (9)
- Virgil Evans – (9)
- William Hinshaw – (9)
- Tom Scott – (9)
- Brian Wilson – backing vocals (9)
- Gary Usher – backing vocals (9)

Unconfirmed personnel

- Brian Wilson – piano (9)

Production

- Jan Berry – arranger, producer
- George Tipton – arranger
- Woody Woodward – art direction
- Ken Kim – photography
- Dean Torrence – rear cover design, liner notes
- Ray Pohlman – orchestrator (9)

== Charts ==
Chart performance for Filet of Soul: A "Live" One
Chart (1966)	Peak position
US Billboard Top LPs	127
US Record World Top 100 LP's	91
