= Sidewalk Surfin' =

Single by Jan and Dean

from the album Ride the Wild Surf
- B-side: "When It's Over"
- Released: September 1964
- Recorded: July 29, 1964
- Genre: Pop
- Length: 2:40
- Label: Liberty
- Songwriters: Brian Wilson, Roger Christian
- Producers: Jan Berry for Screen Gems, Inc.

Jan and Dean singles chronology
"Ride the Wild Surf" (1964)	"Sidewalk Surfin'" (1964)	"(Here They Come) From All Over the World" (1965)

"Sidewalk Surfin'" is a song with music by Brian Wilson and lyrics by Roger Christian, which was recorded by 1960s American pop singers Jan and Dean. The song was released as a single and also appeared on the 1964 albums Ride the Wild Surf and The Little Old Lady from Pasadena. The B-side of the single is "When It's Over." "Sidewalk Surfin'" reached number 25 on the Billboard Hot 100, and became Jan and Dean's lowest-charting single since early 1963. Jan and Dean were known for their music of the 1960s surf era with songs like "Dead Man's Curve," "Drag City," and "The Little Old Lady from Pasadena."

== Composition ==
Jan Berry, Dean Torrence's partner in the Jan and Dean duo, wanted to write and compose about a sport other than surfing. He came up with the idea to make music about skateboarding. After trying, unsuccessfully, to come up with a song about that sport by himself, he decided to parody the Beach Boys' song "Catch a Wave," a song drawn from the group's 1963 album Surfer Girl. Berry asked the composer, Brian Wilson and Wilson's then-current lyricist associate, Roger Christian, to rewrite it. They complied, and eventually came up with "Sidewalk Surfin'," which is "Catch a Wave" with different lyrics about skateboarding.

== Reissue ==
When the original recording of "Sidewalk Surfin'" got reissued as a single 12 years later, in the summer of 1976, the single got radio attention once again. This time, the single hovered right under the Billboard Hot 100, eventually peaking at #107. It became their first, and only, single to get major radio attention, and came close to a placement on the charts, since 1967.

== Live versions ==
Jan and Dean performed a lip-synchronized version of the song on American Bandstand on August 22, 1964. On December 29, 1964, they performed the selection live at the T.A.M.I. Show.

== Cover versions ==
Jan Berry covered the song by himself as a single in 1976, rewriting some of the lyrics to keep up with the new names and tricks of skateboarding of the 1970s. The lyrics were also easier for Berry to sing after the aphasia Berry sustained from his car accident near Dead Man's Curve, on April 12, 1966.

== Charts ==
Chart (1964)	Peak position
Australia (Kent Music Report)	54
Canada R.P.M. Top 40 & 5	12
U.S. Billboard Hot 100	25
U.S. Cash Box Top 100	28
