= Ride the Wild Surf =

1964 film by Don Taylor

- Directed by: Don Taylor
- Written by: Art Napoleon; Jo Napoleon
- Produced by: Art Napoleon; Jo Napoleon
- Starring: Fabian; Shelley Fabares; Peter Brown; Barbara Eden; Tab Hunter; Susan Hart; James Mitchum
- Cinematography: Joseph F. Biroc
- Edited by: Howard A. Smith; Eda Warren
- Music by: Stu Phillips
- Distributed by: Columbia Pictures
- Release date: August 5, 1964
- Running time: 101 minutes
- Country: United States
- Language: English
- Box office: est. $1,400,000 (US/ Canada)

Ride the Wild Surf is a 1964 American romantic drama film. Unlike the beach party movies of the era, this was a departure from the typical Hollywood approach to surfing as it was a drama, not a comedy. It is known for its exceptional big wave surf footage – a common sight in surf movies of the time, but a rarity in Hollywood films. Likewise, the film has only one pop song – the titular Jan and Dean track, which is heard once, at the end of the film.

Tom Lisanti wrote the movie "stands head and shoulders above all the sixties beach party movies... It makes an honorable attempt to portray surfers and the sport of surfing sincerely and to showcase the big waves of the north shore of Hawaii. There are no singing surfers or goofy motorcycle gang members... [It is] the best Hollywood surf movie of the sixties."

== Plot ==
The story follows surfers Jody Wallis (Fabian), Steamer Lane (Tab Hunter), and Chase Colton (Peter Brown), who come to Hawaii's Oahu Island to ride the world's biggest waves and compete against surfers from all over the world.

Steamer falls in love with Lily Kilua (Susan Hart), whose mother objects to the romance because she considers surfers to be "beach bums," since her husband—a surfer—left home and family to follow the surf circuit. Self-described college dropout and surf bum Jody falls for the demure Brie Matthews (Shelley Fabares), who challenges him to return to college. In the case of the relatively strait-laced Chase, he finds himself pursued by the adventurous Augie Poole (Barbara Eden).

The main story, though, is the challenge to surf the monster waves at Waimea Bay, and fit in among the champion surfers there such as Eskimo (James Mitchum). Despite conflicts, injuries and rocky romances, Wallis, Chase and Steamer prove themselves brave—or crazy—enough to try to be the last one to ride in the highest wave.

== Cast ==
- Fabian as Jody Wallis
- Tab Hunter as Steamer Lane
- Peter Brown as Chase Colton
- Shelley Fabares as Brie Matthews
- Barbara Eden as Augie Poole
- Roger Davis as Charlie
- James Mitchum as Eskimo
- Susan Hart as Lily Kilua
- Catherine McLeod as Mrs. Kilua
- John Anthony Hayes as Frank Decker
- Murray Rose as Swag
- Mark Le Buse as Phil

== Production ==
=== Development ===
The film was written by Jo and Art Napoleon. From late 1963 to early 1964, they traveled with cinematographer Joseph Biroc to Hawaii to shoot surf footage of surfers. They filmed at Haleiwa, Sunset Beach, Pipeline and Waimea Bay. The surfers included Mickey Dora (who doubled for Jody, Fabian's character), Phil Edwards, Rusty Miller, and Mike Hynson. Surfer Greg "Da Bull" Noll was so impressive that the Napoleons created the character Eskimo based on footage featuring him.

They then returned to Hollywood to write the script. They pitched the project to Columbia who agreed to finance. It was originally going to be called Surfing Wild and star Glenn Corbett. The movie is sometimes called a beach party film although it has been argued it is closer to a male Where the Boys Are than the musical Beach Party.

=== Casting ===
Jan and Dean both were scheduled to appear in the film, supporting Fabian, who was borrowed from 20th Century Fox. Jan and Dean were pulled by Columbia after Dean's friend, Barry Keenan, became involved in the kidnapping of Frank Sinatra, Jr. in December 1963. They were replaced by Tab Hunter and Peter Brown.

Hunter made the film after the Broadway flop The Milk Train Doesn't Stop Here Anymore. He later said Ride the Wild Surf "was cut from the same cloth as the movies I made with Natalie [Wood] in the mid-fifties. Only this time it was 'Dad, can I have the big surfboard tonight?' " Hunter drew inspiration for his performance from his brother Walt who was a surfer.

Susan Hart was cast after impressing Mike Frankovich of Hollywood in some TV appearances she had made; she dyed her hair black for her role. Hart was seen by James H. Nicholson of AIP in the film, which led to him signing her to that studio and later marrying her.

Eden was cast in February 1964. Shelley Fabares was known for The Donna Reed Show and this was her first movie.

Fabian had never surfed before and spent three weeks learning. Australian Olympic swimming champion Murray Rose was given a small role.

Locals in the cast included Alan Le Buse of Sea Life Park, John Kernell of KONA-TV, Yankee Chang and David Cadiente.

The surfboards used in this film were by Phil of Downey, California - aka Phil Sauers, the maker of "Surfboards of the Stars." Sauers is portrayed in Ride the Wild Surf as a character, played by Mark LaBuse. Sauers was also the stunt coordinator for the film.

Of the three surfer leads, raven-haired Peter Brown was made into a blonde by makeup artist Ben Lane (to match the hair of Brown's surfing double, Mike Hynson – and to keep all three men from being brunets), which required his girlfriend, the blonde Barbara Eden, to have auburn hair; likewise the dark-haired Shelley Fabares – who is paired with the dark-haired Fabian, became a Scandinavian blonde. Susan Hart’s black hair was sufficiently different from her male counterpart Tab Hunter’s that no change was required.

The stunt surfers were given swim trunks that matched their movie star counterparts, except for star James Mitchum, who was instead given trunks that replicated his stunt double Greg Noll’s famous black & white "jailhouse stripe" boardshorts. Hunter and Brown dyed their hair to match the stuntmen. "A rare case of the stars doubling for the stunt men," wrote Hunter later.

=== Shooting ===
Unlike most of the Hollywood beach movies – whose location was Southern California – Ride the Wild Surf was filmed in Hawaii at a time when environmental conditions created exceptionally large waves. In November and December 1962, Waimea broke often. The jet stream had altered its course temporarily and huge west swell surfs became common all the way through the following February, which was when Columbia arrived to shoot the movie.

Art Napoleon and Fabian arrived in Hawaii in mid February 1964 . Filming started in Waiemea Bay, Hawaii on 28 February 1964 under the direction of Art Napoleon. Production was difficult and plagued with a series of problems. In March 1964 Columbia fired Art Napoleon. The production was shut down and Don Taylor flown out to replace Napoleon. According to some reports, Taylor scrapped all of Napoleon's footage. Locations used included Kawela Bay, Sunset Beach, Haleiwa Bay, and Makaha.

Hedda Hopper reported Hunter "didn't endear himself to the other surfers when he didn't like his dormitory quarters and got himself an apartment" and "they tell me Jim Mitchum is trying to act like his father."

Don Taylor's mother died during the shoot so Phil Karlson took over directing for three days. Tab Hunter had enjoyed working with Karlson on Gunman's Walk and arranged for the schedule to be changed so Karlson could direct a scene where Hunter's character argues with Hart's character's mother. "It was the only half decent scene I had," wrote Hunter. "Karlson was a true pro and I was happy to work with him again, however briefly."

Surfers Miki Dora, Greg Noll and Butch Van Artsdalen performed a large part of the surfing seen in the film.

"It was extremely hard to photograph," said Fabian. "Boats can't ride along with the big waves when they break and how do you hit your mark in the water? Everyone in the cast had coral cuts; live coral is infectious when embedded in the flesh. The scar on my foot will be with me for life."

Hunter said the film "may not have had dialogue by Tennessee Williams but it was work and I was glad to have it. Some of my callow colleagues however had yet to learn how fleeting it all can be. Making a film about the hang loose carefree surfing life was an excuse for some of them to waste time and money clowning around, intentionally screwing up takes." Hunter says he scolded the cast, causing the crew to applaud. "I was now officially the Old Fart on set," he wrote later.

Footage of Hunter, Brown and Fabian on surfboards was shot on the Columbia backlot, using back projection. "It's amazing to think anyone was taken in by this pasted-together version of surfer culture," said Hunter.

== Music ==
The soundtrack was composed by Stu Phillips - it was the third film score he had ever composed. Phillips also founded Colpix Records and produced hits for Nina Simone, The Skyliners and one of Ride the Wild Surf's stars, Shelley Fabares.

The title song was written by Jan Berry, Brian Wilson, and Roger Christian, and recorded by Jan & Dean becoming a Top 20 national hit, reaching number 16 on the Billboard Hot 100.

=== Movie tie-in ===
Although the film featured much music, a short version of "Ride the Wild Surf" was the only credited song in the film. Liberty Records released the Jan & Dean album Ride the Wild Surf in connection with the film. The cover, rendered in a Mondrian style collage, featured a photo of Jan & Dean accompanied by 11 photos from the film, with copy written to make it appear as though it was a soundtrack album: “Jan & Dean Sing the Original Soundtrack Recording of the Title Song from 'Ride the Wild Surf'.” The liner notes on the back cover featured an endorsement written by the film's star, Shelley Fabares. Of the 12 tracks on the LP, only one was from the film: a 2:13-long version of the title song.

== Reception ==
The movie had its world premiere in Honolulu on 29 July 1964. It was released on the mainland in August.

=== Box office ===
Tab Hunter called the film "a big hit" and meant he was associated with beach movies of the 1950s and 1960s even though he only made one "and it's not that hot".

=== Critical ===
The New York Times called it "unexpectedly enjoyable vacation fare". Joan Didion writing in Vogue called it "a first rate surfer" movie adding "there are few other opportunities in a bleak city autumn to spend forty unbroken minutes watching immense translucent combers rise and curl in the sunlight".

The Los Angeles Times called it "wholesome, routine entertainment."

== See also ==
- Blue Crush, a 2002 film about three surfer girls living in Hawaii
- North Shore, a 1987 film about a surfer from Arizona who learns to surf in Hawaii

== Sources ==
- Hunter, Tab (2005). Tab Hunter confidential. Algonquin Books of Chapel Hill. ISBN 9781565124660.
