= Folk 'n Roll =

Studio album by Jan and Dean
- Released: November 1965
- Genre: Pop rock
- Length: 32:53
- Label: Liberty
- Producer: Jan Berry for Screen Gems, Inc.

Jan and Dean chronology
Command Performance/Live in Person (1965)	Folk 'n Roll (1965)	Jan & Dean Meet Batman (1966)

Singles from Folk 'n Roll
- 1. "I Found a Girl" / "It's a Shame to Say Goodbye" Released: September 8, 1965; 2. "The Universal Coward" / "I Can't Wait to Love You" Released: October 29, 1965; 3. "A Beginning From an End" / "Folk City" Released: December 10, 1965

Professional ratings
Review scores
Source	Rating
AllMusic	2/5 stars

Folk 'n Roll is a studio album by Jan and Dean. It was released by Liberty Records in November 1965.

== Background and recording ==
During recording of the album, Dean Torrence joined the Beach Boys in the studio and recorded "Barbara Ann" with the group for the Beach Boys' Party! album. Torrence stated that Liberty Records wanted the duo to sign a release form to appear on the album, or the company would withhold their royalties.

== Songs ==
Jan and Dean's version of "Eve of Destruction" reused the backing track from Barry McGuire's original recording of the song. "Where Were You When I Needed You" was later recorded by the Grass Roots.

Regarding the duo's version of "Yesterday", Torrence said, "Jan did a terrific job in recreating the track; it's a great song. I was fortunate enough to pull it off in a couple of takes because that's all I got." Torrence did not appear on "The Universal Coward", which has been described as Berry's response to the song "Universal Soldier". Author Mark A. Moore described the song as "a spoof of the fledgling anti-war movement, taking everything in the opposite direction from "Eve of Destruction.""

== Release ==
In November 1965, Liberty Records released Folk 'n Roll in mono and stereo. The album charted at number 145 on the Billboard Top LPs chart.

On March 19, 1996, One Way Records reissued the album on CD as a two-fer with Surf City and Other Swingin' Cities.

=== Singles ===
"It's a Shame to Say Goodbye" was set to be issued as a single in July 1965, with "The Submarine Races" as the B-side, but the release was canceled. Jan Berry also planned to release "I Found a Girl" and "It's a Shame to Say Goodbye" as part of a four-track EP, but Liberty rejected the proposal.

"I Found a Girl" was released as a single on September 8, with "I Can't Wait to Love You" as the B-side. It reached number 30 on the Billboard Hot 100. On October 29, Liberty released "The Universal Coward" as a solo Jan Berry single, with "I Can't Wait to Love You" as the B-side. The single failed to chart. The single was Berry's second solo release following his 1961 single "Tomorrow's Teardrops". On December 10, "A Beginning From an End" was released as a single, with "Folk City" as the B-side. The single peaked at number 109 on Billboard's Bubbling Under the Hot 100 chart.

== Critical reception ==
Billboard described the album as "[a] definite chart blockbuster". Cash Box's review of the album stated, "The combination of the boys['] popularity, the potent rock sound and the timely tunes should make this one a biggie." Richie Unterberger of AllMusic described the album as "a rather lame, standard Jan & Dean album in which they occasionally peek into folk-rock material", and wrote that the genre "was not suitable for Jan & Dean, whether in earnest or satire".

== Track listing ==
Side one
No.	Title	Writer(s)	Length
1.	"I Found a Girl"	P.F. Sloan; Steve Barri	2:20
2.	"Hang On Sloopy (My Girl Sloopy)"	Bert Russell; Wes Farrell	3:05
3.	"I Can't Wait to Love You"	Jan Berry; Roger Christian; George Tipton	2:37
4.	"Eve of Destruction"	Sloan	3:28
5.	"It's a Shame to Say Goodbye"	Don Altfeld; Jill Gibson	2:15
6.	"Where Were You When I Needed You"	Sloan; Barri	2:45
Total length:			16:30

Side two
No.	Title	Writer(s)	Length
1.	"A Beginning From an End"	Berry; Christian; Cleve Hermann; Tipton	2:58
2.	"Yesterday"	John Lennon; Paul McCartney	2:20
3.	"The Universal Coward"	Berry; Gibson; Tipton	3:04
4.	"It Ain't Me Babe"	Bob Dylan	2:07
5.	"Folk City"	Berry; Christian	2:25
6.	"Turn! Turn! Turn!"	Pete Seeger	3:29
Total length:			16:23 32:53

== Personnel ==
Per Mark A. Moore.

- Jan Berry - harmony vocals
- Dean Torrence - harmony vocals
- Phil Sloan - harmony vocals
- Steve Barri - harmony vocals
- George Tipton - harmony vocals

Technical

- Jan Berry - arranger, producer
- George Tipton - arranger
- Bones Howe - engineer
- Lanky Linstrot - engineer
- Hal Blaine - conductor
- Woody Woodward - cover design
- Ken Kim - photography
- Dean Torrence - liner notes

== Charts ==
Chart performance for Folk 'n Roll
Chart (1965)	Peak position
US Billboard Top LPs	145
US Cash Box Top 100 Albums	87
