= The Fantastic Baggys =

- Origin: Los Angeles, California, U.S.
- Genres: Pop rock
- Years active: 1964–1965
- Label: Imperial
- Past members: P.F. Sloan; Steve Barri

The Fantastic Baggys were an American surf and hot rod group, created by P.F. Sloan and Steve Barri. The studio group released several unsuccessful singles. They released one album internationally, Tell 'Em I'm Surfin' (1964) on Imperial Records, and several singles and albums only in South Africa, where they proved to be briefly popular.

== History ==
Prior to recording as the Fantastic Baggys, Sloan and Barri recorded "Move Out Little Mustang" as Rally-Packs. The single was produced by Jan Berry of the duo Jan and Dean for Dunhill Productions. Berry also co-wrote and sang the bass vocals on the recording. The single was released by Imperial Records on April 29, 1964 and received positive notices in Billboard and Cash Box, but failed to chart. The B-side was "Bucket Seats", an instrumental Berry produced. Berry chose to go uncredited for his contributions as he was tied exclusively to Screen Gems, which subsequently sued Berry and members of "his creative inner circle" for numerous contractual violations, including the release of "Bucket Seats". Both "Move Out Little Mustang" and "Bucket Seats", retitled "Old Ladies Seldom Power Shift", later appeared on the Jan and Dean album The Little Old Lady from Pasadena, where they were labeled as Jan and Dean tracks. "Move Out Little Mustang" appeared as a bonus track on the 1992 The Best of the Fantastic Baggys: Tell 'Em I'm Surfin' CD compilation.

The Fantastic Baggys were originally known as the Baggys. According to Dawn Eden Goldstein, the "Fantastic" was added when Mick Jagger "responded with facetious wit" with the term after Sloan and Barri's employer Lou Adler played Jagger and Andrew Loog Oldham early demos by the group.

Imperial released the Fantastic Baggys' first single "Tell 'Em I'm Surfin'" on June 5, followed by an album of the same title in July. The single appeared on Record World's 100 Top Pops chart, where it peaked at number 99 on August 15. The album cover showed four members, though Sloan and Barri were the only members of the group.

The Fantastic Baggys were credited as providing additional vocals on the Jan and Dean albums Ride the Wild Surf, The Little Old Lady from Pasadena, and Command Performance/Live in Person. Jan and Dean's versions of "Tell 'Em I'm Surfin'" and "Summer Means Fun" both reused the Fantastic Baggys' backing tracks and harmony vocals, though the latter received additional instrumental overdubs. The group released two non-album singles, "Anywhere the Girls Are" and "It Was I".

The band's music attained popularity in South Africa, and Imperial's local division released two further albums under the Fantastic Baggys name. The 1966 album Ride the Wild Surf featured several outtakes recorded by Sloan and Barri with the remainder by local musicians, while the 1967 album Surfer's Paradise only featured one Sloan and Barri composition, "Only When You're Lonely". In October 1966, Billboard listed the group's single "Tell 'Em I'm Surfin'" on their Hits of the World chart as reaching number two in South Africa. In January 1967, Billboard listed the group's "Papa Do Ron Ron" as reaching number ten in the country.

== Discography ==
=== Singles ===
- 1964: "Tell 'Em I'm Surfin'" b/w "A Surfer Boy's Dream" (Imperial 66047) RW #99, South Africa #2
- 1964: "Anywhere the Girls Are" b/w "Debbie Be True" (Imperial 66072)
- 1965: "It Was I" / "Alone on the Beach" (Imperial 66092)
- 1966: "Papa Do Ron Ron (New Girl in Town)" / "Anywhere the Girls Are" (South Africa-exclusive release) South Africa #10
- 1967: "Four And Twenty Hours" / "Ride the Wild Surf" (South Africa-exclusive release)

=== Singles (backing other musicians) ===
- Shelley Fabares "I Know You'll Be There" b/w "Lost Summer Love" (Vee-Jay VJ 632) - The Fantastic Baggys play (uncredited) backing on Side One
- Jan & Dean "The Little Old Lady (from Pasadena)" b/w "My Mighty G.T.O" (Liberty 55704)
- Jan & Dean "Ride The Wild Surf" b/w "The Anaheim, Azusa & Cucamonga Sewing Circle, Book Review And Timing Association" (Liberty 55724)

=== Albums ===
- Tell 'Em I'm Surfin' (Imperial 12270, Mono, 1964)
- Ride the Wild Surf (1966)
- Surfer's Paradise (1967)

=== Compilation albums ===
- Surfin' Craze (Edsel 118, 1986)
- The Best of the Fantastic Baggys: Tell 'Em I'm Surfin' (Capitol, 1992)
- Anywhere the Girls Are!: The Best of the Fantastic Baggys (Sundazed, 2000)
