= Ride the Wild Surf (song) =

Single by Jan and Dean

from the album Ride the Wild Surf
- B-side: "The Anaheim, Azusa & Cucamonga Sewing Circle, Book Review and Timing Association"
- Released: August 26, 1964
- Recorded: January-August 9, 1964
- Studio: United Recording (Hollywood, California)
- Genre: Pop rock
- Length: 2:19
- Label: Liberty
- Songwriters: Jan Berry; Roger Christian; Brian Wilson
- Producer: Jan Berry for Screen Gems, Inc.

Jan and Dean singles chronology
"The Little Old Lady from Pasadena" (1964)	"Ride the Wild Surf" (1964)	"Sidewalk Surfin'" (1964)

Official audio
- "Ride the Wild Surf" on YouTube

"Ride the Wild Surf" is a song written by Jan Berry, Roger Christian, and Brian Wilson as the title theme for the 1964 film Ride the Wild Surf, and performed by Jan and Dean.

== Background and recording ==
Jan and Dean were originally set to perform the title theme as well as appear in the Columbia Pictures film Ride the Wild Surf. Their roles were cut from the film early in production due to Dean Torrence's connections to Barry Keenan, the main perpetrator in the Frank Sinatra Jr. kidnapping case. However, Jan and Dean's title theme did appear at the end of the finished film.

Author Mark A. Moore wrote that the title song to the film was tracked "sometime in January or early February 1964". On February 16, two vocal sessions were held at United Recording. During the first session, Jan Berry, Dean Torrence, Phil Sloan and Steve Barri overdubbed harmony vocals onto the track. Brian Wilson joined them during the second vocal session, which saw them add "[v]ocal leads and harmonies". Wilson and Berry doubled the lead vocal. Moore notes that Berry sang the lead "by himself" on some takes, with Wilson adding falsetto vocals. On August 9, the track saw further tracking and vocal work in separate sessions, with Barri and Sloan adding more vocals.

== Release and critical reception ==
In August, "Ride the Wild Surf" appeared on the Jan and Dean album of the same name as the first track on side one. Liberty Records released the song as a single on August 26, with "The Anaheim, Azusa & Cucamonga Sewing Circle, Book Review and Timing Association" as the B-side. "Ride the Wild Surf" charted at number 16 on the Billboard Hot 100, while "Anaheim, Azusa & Cucamonga" reached number 77.

Billboard described the song as having a "first-rate surfin' sound". Cash Box listed "Ride the Wild Surf" as the B-side of "Anaheim, Azusa & Cucamonga", and simply described the song as a "jumpin' coupler [...] Watch it, too!". William Ruhlmann of AllMusic wrote that the "arrangement and production [...] were more elaborate than usual", but noted that the song "was still typical of Jan & Dean's output in 1964, their most successful year".

== Charts ==
Chart (1964)	Peak position
Australia (Kent Music Report)	24
Canada R.P.M. Top 40 & 5	11
U.S. Billboard Hot 100	23
U.S. Cash Box Top 100	16
