= I Found a Girl =

I Found a Girl may refer to:

- "I Found a Girl" (Jan and Dean song), 1965
- "I Found a Girl" (The Vamps song), 2016
- "I Found That Girl", a 1970 The Jackson 5 song written by the Corporation (Berry Gordy, Alphonso Mizell, Freddie Perren and Deke Richards)
