= Popsicle (song) =

Single by Jan and Dean

from the album Drag City
- B-side: "Norwegian Wood (This Bird Has Flown)"
- Released: 1966
- Recorded: 1963
- Genre: Pop, Rock
- Length: 2:36
- Label: Liberty Records
- Songwriters: Buzz Cason, Bobby Russell
- Producers: Jan Berry for Screen Gems, Inc.

Jan and Dean singles chronology
"Batman!" (1966)	"Popsicle" (1966)	"Fiddle Around" (1966)

"Popsicle" is a song written by Buzz Cason and Bobby Russell. It was first recorded in 1962 by the Todds. The song was originally released on their 1963 album Drag City.

== Background ==
After Jan Berry's near fatal car accident near Dead Man's Curve in 1966, Dean Torrence had one last effort to save Jan & Dean's name by releasing a new album with "Popsicle" as the title track. The new album consisted of all previously released songs. Popsicle was then released as a single with the B side being a remake of The Beatles' "Norwegian Wood (This Bird Has Flown)".

== Performers ==
- Jan Berry: Lead vocals
- Dean Torrence: Backing vocals and harmony

== Chart performance ==
Chart (1966)	Peak position
Canada RPM 100	3
U.S. Billboard Hot 100	21
U.S. Cash Box Top 100	24
