= The New Girl in School =

Single by Jan and Dean

from the album Dead Man's Curve / The New Girl in School
- A-side: "Dead Man's Curve"
- Released: February 7, 1964
- Recorded: 1963
- Genre: Pop, Rock
- Length: 2:27
- Label: Liberty
- Songwriters: Jan Berry, Roger Christian, Brian Wilson, Bob Norberg
- Producers: Jan Berry for Screen Gems, Inc.

Jan and Dean singles chronology
"Drag City" (1963)	"The New Girl in School" (1964)	"The Little Old Lady from Pasadena" (1964)

"The New Girl in School" is a song written by Jan Berry, Roger Christian, Brian Wilson, and Bob Norberg for the American rock duet Jan and Dean. It was the B-side of their hit single "Dead Man's Curve". Both songs were released on their album Dead Man's Curve / The New Girl In School. "The New Girl From School" charted at number 37 on the Billboard Hot 100. In Canada the song was co-charted with "Dead Man's Curve" and they reached number 39.

== Background ==
The song was initially titled "Gonna Hustle You", but Liberty Records made Jan and Dean change the title and lyrics because the label thought the general public would interpret the song as being too raunchy, insinuated by the word "hustle". Jan and Dean then renamed the song to "Get A Chance With You" and changed some of the lyrics; however, the record company still thought the meaning of the song was too suggestive. Jan & Dean retitled the song to "The New Girl in School" and brought in a fourth songwriter, Roger Christian, to help rewrite the lyrics.

=== Personnel ===
- Jan Berry – lead and backing vocals
- Dean Torrence – lead and backing vocals
- The Honeys – backing vocals
- The Wrecking Crew – instrumentation

== Release history ==
The song was Jan & Dean's best charting B-side. After Jan Berry's near fatal crash near Dead Man's Curve in April 1966, Liberty put out the version "Gonna Hustle You" on Jan and Dean's album Filet of Soul: A "Live" One. In 1973, Dean Torrence released "Gonna Hustle You" as a single, by overdubbing the original lyrics under his band, Legendary Masked Surfers. In 1976, Jan and Dean released "Gonna Hustle You" as a single. In 1996, the version "Get A Chance With You" got an official release on the album, All The Hits From Surf City To Drag City.

== Cover versions ==
- 1975 - The Magnificent Mercury Brothers, Transatlantic Records BIG 532 7"
- 1990 – Peter Stampfel & The Bottle Caps, Smiles, Vibes & Harmony: A Tribute to Brian Wilson (as "Gonna Hustle You")
- 1995 – Alex Chilton, A Man Called Destruction

== Charts ==
Chart (1964)	Peak position
Canada (CHUM Chart Parade)	39
U.S. Billboard Hot 100	37
U.S. Cash Box Top 100	26
