= You Really Know How to Hurt a Guy =

Single by Jan and Dean

from the album Jan & Dean Golden Hits, Volume 2
- B-side: "It's As Easy As 1, 2, 3"
- Released: April 1965
- Genre: Pop
- Length: 3:26
- Label: Liberty
- Songwriters: Jan Berry, Jill Gibson, Roger Christian
- Producers: Jan Berry for Screen Gems, Inc.

Jan and Dean singles chronology
"(Here They Come) From All Over the World" (1965)	"You Really Know How to Hurt a Guy" (1965)	"I Found a Girl" (1965)

"You Really Know How to Hurt a Guy" is a song whose music was composed by Jan Berry, Jill Gibson, and Roger Christian, which was recorded by 1960s American pop singers, Jan and Dean. The song was recorded and released as a single and then appeared on the 1965 album Jan & Dean Golden Hits, Volume 2. The B-side of the single is "It's As Easy As 1,2,3." "You Really Know How to Hurt A Guy" reached up to number 27 on the Billboard Hot 100 on July 10, 1965, which was their highest-charting single of the year on the U.S. Billboard Hot 100, by edging "I Found a Girl" which charted at number 30 later in 1965. Jan and Dean were known for their music of the 1960s surf era with songs like "Dead Man's Curve," "Drag City," and "The Little Old Lady from Pasadena." This single marked the beginning of Jan & Dean getting away from their Surfing roots that they were known for.

== Charts ==
Chart (1965)	Peak position
Canada R.P.M. Play Sheet	7
U.S. Billboard Hot 100	27
U.S. Cash Box Top 100	42
