= Stealing Sinatra =

2003 American television film

- DVD release cover
- Written by: Howard Korder
- Directed by: Ron Underwood
- Starring: David Arquette; William H. Macy; James Russo; Thomas Ian Nicholas
- Music by: John Powell
- Country of origin: United States
- Original language: English

Production
- Producer: Rose Lam
- Cinematography: Brian Pearson
- Editor: Tina Hirsch
- Running time: 96 minutes
- Production companies: Showtime Networks; Ron Ziskin Productions

Original release
- Network: Showtime
- Release: April 22, 2004

Stealing Sinatra is a 2003 American biographical crime comedy-drama film directed by Ron Underwood and starring David Arquette, William H. Macy, Thomas Ian Nicholas, Ryan Browning, and James Russo. The film focuses on the story of the kidnapping of Frank Sinatra Jr. (Nicholas) by Barry Keenan (Arquette), John Irwin (Macy), and Joe Amsler (Browning). Russo portrays Frank Sinatra.

The film was screened at the Sarasota Film Festival on January 24, 2003, and premiered on Showtime in the United States on April 22, 2004. Macy was nominated for a Primetime Emmy Award for his performance.

== Cast ==
- David Arquette as Barry Keenan
- William H. Macy as John Irwin
- Thomas Ian Nicholas as Frank Sinatra Jr.
- Ryan Browning as Joe Amsler
- James Russo as Frank Sinatra
- Sam McMurray as Agent Stamek
- Angelika Baran as Nancy Sinatra Jr.
- Gillian Barber as Mary Keenan
- Catherine Barroll as Nancy Sinatra
- Eric Johnson as Dean Torrance
- Michael Coristine as Jan Berry
- Michael Kopsa as Billy

== Critical reception ==
Richard Roeper of At The Movies gave the film a positive review, calling it an "enjoyable, low-key farce." Ray Richmond of Today praised Macy's "typically sublime" and "bravura" performance, stating that he "steals the show." He also praised Arquette's performance as "memorable." Nathan Rabin of The A.V. Club also praised Macy's performance, and complimented the film's humor.

In contrast, John Leonard of New York Magazine gave the film a negative review, stating that it "just sort of ambles along between the ears, behind the eyes, to nowhere much," although he praised the performances of the cast.

== Accolades ==
| Year | Award | Category | Recipients | Result |
|---|---|---|---|---|
| 2004 | Primetime Emmy Awards | Outstanding Supporting Actor in a Miniseries or a Movie | William H. Macy | Nominated |
| 2004 | Online Film & Television Association | Best Supporting Actor in a Motion Picture or Miniseries | William H. Macy | Nominated |
| 2005 | Satellite Awards | Best Actor in a Supporting Role in a Series, Miniseries or Motion Picture Made for Television | William H. Macy | Nominated |
