= Kathryn Minner =

American actress (1892–1969)

- Kathryn Minner in The Trouble with Angels, 1966
- Born: Kathryn Elizabeth White; January 3, 1892; New York City, U.S.
- Died: May 26, 1969 (aged 77); Van Nuys, California, U.S.
- Occupation: Actress

Kathryn Elizabeth Minner (January 3, 1892 – May 26, 1969), sometimes credited as Katherine Minner, was an American character actress who specialized in playing "little old ladies" in movies, on various television shows, and in a series of television commercials for Southern California Dodge dealers.

== Biography ==
=== Wife and mother ===
Born Kathryn Elizabeth White in New York City to William H. White and his wife Mary, she married Samuel Stephen Minner on June 17, 1914, in Newark, New Jersey. They initially settled in Kearny, New Jersey, where their first son, Samuel Raymond (known as "Raymond"), was born on June 15, 1915. The Minners soon moved to Flemington, New Jersey, where they had two more children, a daughter, Rita Virginia, born on March 14, 1918, and a son, William James, born on April 25, 1919. They remained in Flemington until they moved to California in the mid-1950s to be closer to their son Raymond, who had taken a job with Prudential Insurance Company and was transferred to Los Angeles.

=== Acting career ===
Making her first acting appearance at the age of 65 in a 1957 episode of Dragnet, Minner was best known for her appearances in a series of ten television commercials for Chrysler Corporation's Dodge Division which aired in Southern California from 1964 to 1969, and as the red shawl-wearing little old lady on the cover of the 1964 Jan and Dean album The Little Old Lady from Pasadena.

In the spring of 1964, Minner came to the attention of the Kohner Agency in Hollywood after she answered a casting call wearing a red shawl, black gloves, and a pair of Keds sneakers. She was perfect for the part of the "little old lady", which would be featured in a series of upcoming television commercials for Southern California Dodge dealers, and was hired on the spot. The commercials became one of the most memorable advertising campaigns of the 1960s. Her famous tag line in that Clio Award-winning campaign was "Put a Dodge in your garage, honey!" Minner became a Southern California celebrity for teens, parents, and even bikers. She even made an appearance on The Dating Game, which became their highest-rated show.

=== Death ===
Kathryn's husband of almost 53 years, Sam Minner, died in January 1967 at the age of 80, and a little more than two years later, on May 26, 1969, Kathryn died of a heart attack in Van Nuys, California at the age of 77. Kathryn was buried next to her husband at the San Fernando Mission Cemetery in the Mission Hills community of Los Angeles, California.

== Filmography ==
Film
Year	Title	Role	Notes
1958	The Beast of Budapest	Old Lady	Uncredited
1958	Cole Younger, Gunfighter	Mrs. Nelson	Uncredited
1966	The Trouble with Angels	Old Lady with Bird	Uncredited
1968	Blackbeard's Ghost	Old Lady #3	
1968	The Shakiest Gun In The West	96-Year-Old Woman	Uncredited
1968	The Love Bug	Flower Saleswoman	Uncredited
1969	Angel in My Pocket	Mrs. Williams	(final film role)
Television
Year	Title	Role	Notes
1956-1957	Dragnet	Landlady	1 episode
1966	My Favorite Martian	Mama	2 episodes
1966	Hey, Landlord		1 episode
1966	I Spy	Little Old Lady	1 episode
1966	The Man From U.N.C.L.E.	Old Lady	1 episode
1966	Family Affair	Woman	1 episode
1966	My Three Sons	Old Lady	1 episode
1966	Batman	Old Lady	1 episode
1967	Get Smart	Little Old Lady	1 episode
1968	Petticoat Junction	Old Lady	1 episode
1968	The Wild Wild West	75 year Old woman	1 episode
1969	Gunsmoke	Grandmother	1 episode
