= (Here They Come) From All Over the World =

Single by Jan and Dean

from the album Command Performance/Live in Person
- B-side: "Freeway Flyer"
- Released: February 4, 1965
- Length: 2:47
- Label: Liberty
- Songwriters: P.F. Sloan; Steve Barri
- Producer: Jan Berry for Screen Gems, Inc.

Jan and Dean singles chronology
"Sidewalk Surfin'" (1964)	"(Here They Come) From All Over the World" (1965)	"You Really Know How to Hurt a Guy" (1965)

Official audio
- "Theme From The T.A.M.I. Show (Here They Come From All Over The World) (Live In Sacramento, CA/1964)" on YouTube

"(Here They Come) From All Over the World" is a song written by P.F. Sloan and Steve Barri for the 1964 film T.A.M.I. Show, and performed by the American pop rock duo Jan and Dean.

== Background and composition ==
The song was used in the opening credits of the concert film T.A.M.I. Show, which Jan and Dean hosted. During the intro, they are shown riding skateboards and go-karts. The lyrics erroneously refer to the Rolling Stones as being from Liverpool. An alternate version of the song, titled "Music City", was also recorded, but was not released until 1996, when it appeared on the Jan and Dean CD compilation All the Hits: From Surf City to Drag City. The "Music City" version does not have the error and refers to the Rolling Stones as coming from London.

== Release and critical reception ==
In January 1965, "(Here They Come) From All Over the World" appeared on the Jan and Dean live album Command Performance/Live in Person, with overdubbed audience responses. On February 4, 1965, Liberty Records released "(Here They Come) From All Over the World" as a single, with "Freeway Flyer" as the B-side. Billboard and Cash Box both listed "Freeway Flyer" as the A-side of the single. "(Here They Come) From All Over the World" charted at number 56 on the Billboard Hot 100.

Jan and Dean performed the song on the unaired pilot for the variety series Where the Action Is. On February 27, they performed the song on The Hollywood Palace.

Cash Box described the song as "an infectious hard-driving item".

== Charts ==
Chart (1965)	Peak position
Canada R.P.M. Top 40 & 5	9
U.S. Billboard Hot 100	56
U.S. Cash Box Top 100	50
