= Baby Talk (Jan and Dean song) =

Single by Jan and Dean

from the album The Jan & Dean Sound
- B-side: "Jeanette Get Your Hair Done"
- Released: May 1959
- Recorded: 1959
- Genre: Doo-wop, California Sound
- Length: 2:30
- Label: Doré
- Songwriter: Melvin Schwartz
- Producers: Lou Adler, Herb Alpert

Jan and Dean singles chronology
"Baby Talk" (1959)	"There's a Girl" (1959)

"Baby Talk" is a song was originally released as a single in 1959 by The Laurels on Spring Records, though their version failed to chart. Later in 1959, the song was recorded by Jan and Dean which was a Top 10 hit for them on Doré Records. In 1962, Jan & Dean released a sequel to the song, entitled "She's Still Talking Baby Talk".

== Background ==
Jan Berry worked on the song with friends and Dore Records staffers Lou Adler and Herb Alpert. Alpert recalled recording the song in Jan's garage. While not usually considered part of the "surf pop" genre, it contains many elements of what would become the signature sound of southern California in the early '60s such as the close vocal harmonies combined with falsetto sounds. Original pressings of the single were mislabeled as by "Jan & Arnie"; this was later corrected.

== Chart performance ==
The song spent 12 weeks on the Billboard Hot 100 chart peaking at No. 10, while reaching No. 28 on Billboard's Hot R&B Sides. In Canada, the song reached No. 8 on the CHUM Charts.
