= Jennie Lee (song) =

1958 single by Jan and Arnie

Single by Jan and Arnie
- B-side: "Gotta Getta Date"
- Released: April 1958
- Genre: Pop, California sound
- Length: 2:01
- Label: Arwin
- Songwriters: Jan Berry, Arnie Ginsburg
- Producer: Don Ralke's Music

Jan and Arnie singles chronology
| "Jennie Lee" (1958) | "Gas Money" (1958) |

"Jennie Lee" is a song whose music was composed and written by Jan Berry and Arnie Ginsburg, which was recorded by Jan and Arnie. Jan & Arnie were the precursor to Jan & Dean. The song was recorded and released as the band's first single in April, 1958. The B-side of the single is "Gotta Getta Date". "Jennie Lee" reached No. 3 on the Cash Box charts on June 21, 1958, and No. 8 on the Billboard charts on June 30, 1958. This is generally regarded as the earliest example of elements that would become instrumental in the famous California sound of surf pop in the '60s.

== Composition ==
After being inspired by a poster featuring local Hollywood burlesque dancer Virginia Lee Hicks, who performed as Jennie Lee, the "Bazoom Girl", at the New Follies Burlesk at 548 S. Main Street, Los Angeles, Ginsburg wrote a tribute song, "Jennie Lee", that he brought to Berry and Dean Torrence. Arnold P. Ginsburg, from Wisconsin, grew up in West Los Angeles, and was a school friend of Jan Berry. He is sometimes confused with the Boston radio DJ Arnie "Woo Woo" Ginsburg, but is unrelated.

Berry adapted the Civil War tune "Aura Lea" and arranged the harmonies. After weeks of practice, Berry, Ginsburg, and Torrence planned to make a demo recording in Berry's garage, but Torrence was conscripted into the United States Army Reserve, forcing Berry and Ginsburg to record "Jennie Lee" without Torrence, with Berry's friend and fellow University High student Donald J. Altfeld (born March 18, 1940, in Los Angeles, California) "belting out the rhythm on a children's metal high chair". The next day Berry took their recording to Radio Recorders, a small recording studio, to have it transferred to an acetate disc. Joe Lubin, Vice President and Head of A & R of Doris Day and Martin Melcher's Arwin Records, was impressed and offered to add instruments and to release it through Arwin. In March 1958 the fathers of Berry and Ginsburg signed contracts authorizing Lubin to produce, arrange, and manage their sons.

Berry and Ginsburg, now christened "Jan & Arnie", re-recorded their vocals on a professional recording system. Produced by Lubin, "Jennie Lee" (Arwin 108), backed with "Gotta Get a Date" (credited to Ginsburg, Berry & Lubin), became a surprise commercial success. According to Berry's biographer Mark A. Moore, "The song (with backing vocals, plus additional instruments added by the Ernie Freeman combo) had a raucous R&B flavor, with a bouncing bomp-bomp vocal hook that would become a signature from Jan on future recordings." Distributed by Dot Records, "Jennie Lee" was released in mid-April, entered the charts on May 10, 1958, the same day they appeared on ABC's Dick Clark Show. "Jennie Lee" peaked at No. 3 on the Cash Box charts on June 21, 1958, No. 4 on the R&B charts, and No. 8 on the Billboard charts on June 30, 1958. Billy Ward and his Dominoes's R&B cover of "Jennie Lee" reached No. 55 in the Pop charts in June 1958, while other cover versions including that of Moon Mullican (Coral 9-61994) and Bobby Phillips & the Toppers (Tops 45-R422-49), released in 1958 failed to chart.

== Charts ==
| Chart (1958) | Peak position |
|---|---|
| Australia (Kent Music Report) | 40 |
| U.S. Cash Box Top 100 | 3 |
| US Billboard Hot 100 | 8 |
| U.S. Billboard Most Played By R&B Jockeys | 4 |

== Covers ==
Shortly after Jan and Arnie's version was released, Billy Ward and his Dominoes came out with a cover that charted at number 55 on the US Billboard Hot 100, and placed at 14 on the US R&B charts.

In 1962 Jan & Dean recorded a version of the song on their album Jan & Dean Golden Hits.
