= Don Altfeld =

American songwriter

Donald Jay Altfeld (born 1940, date of death unknown) was an American songwriter. He co-wrote "The Little Old Lady (from Pasadena)" with Jan Berry and Roger Christian.

== Career ==
Originally based in Cleveland, Ohio, Altfeld's family moved to Los Angeles, California in 1956. Altfeld attended University High School, where he became friends with Jan Berry. In 1958, Altfeld co-wrote "Gas Money" with Berry and Arnie Ginsburg, who recorded the song as Jan and Arnie. Altfeld also co-wrote the duo's last single, "The Beat That Can't Be Beat". Berry soon began recording with Dean Torrence as Jan and Dean. Altfeld co-wrote a number of songs with Berry.

In 1964, Altfeld co-wrote the Jan and Dean album track "Bucket "T"" with Berry and Roger Christian. The song was covered by Ronny & the Daytonas, whose version reached number 54 on the Billboard Hot 100 and number five in Canada. In 1966, the Who recorded the song for their EP Ready Steady Who. The group's version of the track reached number one in Sweden.

Altfeld also co-wrote Jan and Dean's 1964 single "The Little Old Lady (from Pasadena)" with Berry and Christian. The song charted at number 3 on the Billboard Hot 100. Berry deliberately omitted his name from the writing credits to avoid contractual obligations with Screen Gems, and subsequently "relinquished any and all rights or claims he may have had" to the song in a lawsuit settlement. In the early 2000s, Altfeld helped to get Berry's writing credits restored to "The Little Old Lady (from Pasadena)" and several other compositions. Altfeld voluntarily assigned half of his 50% royalty share of "Little Old Lady" to Berry.

In November 1967, Altfeld and Steve Zax co-founded Zax-Altfeld & Associates, Inc., which produced and managed recording artists. The company was later renamed Zax-Altfeld-Shapiro, Inc., and eventually became Gulf Pacific Associates after it merged with Horizon Records. In May 1970, Altfeld became production manager and general director of Gulf Pacific's new label Prophesy Records. In September, a special issue of Billboard listed Altfeld as the label's executive vice president. In 1971, Prophesy was purchased by the Roberts-Landers Co., owned by Bobby Roberts and Hal Landers. Altfeld and partner Mickey Shapiro also became co-owners of the company. In 1972, Altfeld co-founded the Mums record label with Roberts and Landers. That same year, Altfeld co-produced Albert Hammond's single "It Never Rains in Southern California".

In 1985, an Associated Press article reported that Altfeld was president of Little Old Lady from Pasadena Enterprises, Inc., and was planning to produce a movie based on "The Little Old Lady (from Pasadena)", starring actress Ethel Sway as the title character. Altfeld was involved in bringing Jan and Dean to China in late 1986, with the duo becoming "the first well-known American rock 'n' roll act to perform" in the country.

Altfeld became involved in the Chinese radio industry in the mid-1980s. In 1988, Altfeld's company ChinAmerica, based in Santa Monica, California, produced The American Music Hour through a partnership with the Chinese government for the China People's Broadcasting Station. The program was intended to introduce American pop music to Chinese audiences. Later, Altfeld founded China USA Entertainment, which signed an exclusive deal with China National Radio in 1994 to provide English-language music programming to mainland China. In 1996, Altfeld's company partnered with The Walt Disney Company to produce the program It's a Small World for China National Radio.

== Personal life ==
In 1962, Altfeld began studying at the California College of Medicine. He graduated from the school in 1966. Altfeld maintained a medical practice in Hawaii until 1979. In 1991, he became licensed to practice in California. Altfeld surrendered his medical license in 2012 after the Medical Board of California alleged that he was filling prescriptions for himself. The board also noted that Altfeld had mental health issues.

During the 1980s, Altfeld resided in Pacific Palisades, California. He was married to Christina Altfeld, and had a son. Altfeld is deceased.

Altfeld's father, Horace E. Altfeld (1915–1964), operated the official Jan & Dean Fan Club, and co-wrote "When It's Over" for the duo.

== Selected discography ==
Songwriting

- "Gas Money" (1958) (with Jan Berry and Arnie Ginsburg) - US #81 for Jan and Arnie
- "Judy Loves Me" (1963) (with Jan Berry and Artie Kornfeld) - US #95 for Johnny Crawford
- "The Little Old Lady (from Pasadena)" (1964) (with Jan Berry and Roger Christian) - US #3 for Jan and Dean
- "One-Piece Topless Bathing Suit" (1964) (with P.F. Sloan and Steve Barri) - US #96 for the Rip Chords
- "The Anaheim, Azusa & Cucamonga Sewing Circle, Book Review And Timing Association" (1964) (with Jan Berry and Roger Christian) - US #50 for Jan and Dean
- "Bucket "T"" (1964) (with Jan Berry and Roger Christian) - US #54, CAN #5 for Ronny & the Daytonas, Sweden #1 for the Who
- "Freeway Flyer" (1965) (with Roger Christian and Jan Berry) - US Cash Box Looking Ahead #14 for Jan and Dean
- "Batman!" (1966) (with Jan Berry and Fred Weider) - US #66 for Jan and Dean
