= Barry Keenan =

American businessman and kidnapper

Barry Keenan (June 26, 1940 – November 13, 2022) was an American businessman, best known as the mastermind behind the 1963 kidnapping of Frank Sinatra Jr.

== Biography ==
At the age of 21, Keenan was already successful in the business world, and was the youngest member of the Los Angeles Stock Exchange. Following a car accident, Keenan became penniless and addicted to painkillers, and he eventually hatched the kidnap-for-ransom scheme and enlisted others to help. Keenan, along with Johnny Irwin and Joe Amsler, conspired to kidnap Frank Sinatra Jr.

Keenan had a psychiatric condition in which he heard voices, and felt that his plan was blessed by God. Since he intended to eventually pay the money back, he did not think the kidnapping was immoral. After successfully abducting Sinatra Jr. from the Harrah's Lodge at South Lake Tahoe, Keenan made contact with Frank Sinatra Sr. to make ransom arrangements.

Sinatra initially offered one million dollars, but Keenan demanded significantly less instead: $240,000. Keenan's demand was equivalent to $2,520,000 in 2025, while Sinatra Sr.'s offer was equivalent to $10,520,000 in 2025. Despite the nature of the crime, Keenan felt that he was bringing the Sinatra family closer together and assisting the Sinatras in other intangible ways.

Sinatra paid the ransom, and the three men released his son. Within days, all three conspirators were apprehended by the FBI. Keenan was sentenced to life plus 75 years in prison for his crimes, but only served four and a half years before he was released, on the grounds that he was legally insane at the time of the crime.

=== Post-release ===
After his release, Keenan became successful as a real estate developer.

The kidnapping was the basis for Stealing Sinatra, a Showtime movie released in 2003 starring David Arquette and William H. Macy. In March 2020, it was announced that Keenan would be played by Grant Gustin in Operation Blue Eyes, a biopic about the kidnapping. The film was to be directed by Joe Mantegna.

Keenan was interviewed about the affair by Ira Glass in a February 2002 episode of the WBEZ radio show This American Life, and by Mike Lanchin in a January 2014 episode of the BBC Radio 4 series Witness.

In 2021, John Stamos released a podcast about the Sinatra kidnappings called Snatching Sinatra, featuring extended interviews with Keenan. Stamos and Keenan became close friends as a result. The following year, Keenan texted Stamos to inform him he was about to kill himself; he died on 13 November 2022. Stamos announced Keenan's death to the world on Instagram, adding:

He was 82. He was in a tremendous amount of physical pain. He's free now... Maybe, wherever he is, he's sitting pretty at the big table with a White Russian in one hand and a Cuban cigar in the other. But Barry, if you see Sinatra Senior at that table, run! He's still pissed at you.
