= I Found a Girl (Jan and Dean song) =

Single by Jan and Dean

from the album Folk 'n Roll
- B-side: "It's a Shame to Say Goodbye"
- Released: September 8, 1965
- Recorded: December 18, 1964-1965
- Studio: Western; United
- Genre: Pop
- Length: 2:20
- Label: Liberty
- Songwriters: P.F. Sloan; Steve Barri
- Producers: Jan Berry for Screen Gems, Inc.

Jan and Dean singles chronology
"You Really Know How to Hurt a Guy" (1965)	"I Found a Girl" (1965)	"A Beginning From An End" (1965)

Official audio
- "I Found a Girl" on YouTube

"I Found a Girl" is a song written by P. F. Sloan and Steve Barri, and recorded by 1960s American pop singers Jan and Dean.

== Background and recording ==
On December 18, 1964, "I Found a Girl" was tracked at Western Recorders. On December 29, brass and woodwind overdubs were added to the track at United Recording. On March 22 and 24, 1965, the song received sweetening at United. P.F. Sloan said he played lead guitar and performed the falsetto vocal.

According to Mark A. Moore, the song was reportedly planned to be included in Jan and Dean's film Easy Come, Easy Go, which began filming on August 4. After one day's shooting, the film was canceled after a train slammed into a moving flatcar on which Jan Berry and members of the film crew were stationed. Berry's leg was nearly severed, and he wore a cast for several months. Berry delivered "I Found a Girl" to Liberty by the end of August.

== Release and reception ==
On September 8, 1965, Liberty Records released "I Found a Girl" as a single, with "It's a Shame to Say Goodbye" as the B-side. An advertisement printed in Cash Box showed an illustration of Berry wearing a cast and saying to Dean Torrence, "I've always wanted to do an original cast record". The single was not issued with a picture sleeve, unlike previous Jan and Dean singles, much to Berry's dismay. Both tracks appeared on the Jan and Dean album Folk 'n Roll in November.

"I Found a Girl" peaked at number 30 on the US Billboard Hot 100. The song was a much bigger hit in Canada, where it reached number two.

Billboard described the single as a "top of the chart contender". Cash Box's review stated that the song had "that money-in-the-bank sound plastered all over it."

== Charts ==
Chart (1965–1966)	Peak position
Australia (Kent Music Report)	62
Canada RPM Top Singles	2
U.S. Billboard Hot 100	30
U.S. Cash Box Top 100	39

== Personnel ==
Known personnel per Mark A. Moore.

=== Additional musicians ===
- Hal Blaine - contractor
- Jimmy Bond
- Russell Bridges
- Glen Campbell
- Roy Caton
- Virgil Evans
- William Hinshaw
- Jules Jacob
- Larry Knechtel
- Lew McCreary
- Bill Pitman
- Tommy Tedesco
- P.F. Sloan - vocals, lead guitar

=== Technical ===
- Jan Berry - arranger, producer

== Other versions ==
P.F. Sloan recorded a version of the song for his 1966 album Twelve More Times.
