= Drag City (song) =

Single by Jan and Dean

from the album Drag City
- B-side: "Schlock Rod (Part 1}"
- Released: November 8, 1963
- Genre: Car song
- Length: 2:34
- Label: Liberty
- Songwriters: Jan Berry, Roger Christian, Brian Wilson
- Producers: Jan Berry for Screen Gems, Inc.

Jan and Dean singles chronology
"Honolulu Lulu" (1963)	"Drag City" (1963)	"Dead Man's Curve" (1964)

Official audio
- "Drag City" on YouTube

"Drag City" is a 1963 song by Jan and Dean, written by Jan Berry, Roger Christian, and Brian Wilson. It describes the narrator's trip to a drag racing strip.

== Release and reception ==
Liberty Records released "Drag City" as a single on November 8, 1963, with "Schlock Rod (Part 1)" as the B-side. Both sides appeared on the album Drag City, which was released on November 27. "Drag City" was the first of the duo's seven hit songs in 1964, and charted in the top ten in January.

Jan and Dean performed "Drag City" on the eighth episode of the TV series Redigo, "Papa-San", which aired on November 12, 1963. The duo re-recorded the song for their appearance on the show.

Billboard gave the song a positive review, calling it "a fast moving roarer with the boys singing against strong beat." Cash Box described the song as "another sock-rock affair loaded with the "Surf City"-"Honolulu Lulu" hit gimmicks. Watch it go." In a retrospective review of the song, William Ruhlmann of AllMusic compared "Drag City" to the duo's "Surf City" and the Beach Boys' "Shut Down", describing the song as "another variation of the same theme" and noting "while "Drag City" is an essential inclusion on any Jan & Dean best-of or compilation of hot rod hits, it has not had much life as a composition independent of time and context."

== Personnel ==
Known personnel per Mark A. Moore and Tony Scherman.

- Brian Wilson - backing vocals
- Earl Palmer - drums

Technical

- Jan Berry - arranger, producer
- Lanky Linstrot - engineer
- Bones Howe - engineer
- Don Kirshner - supervision
- Bones Howe - supervision

== Chart performance ==
Chart (1963–64)	Peak position
Australia (Kent Music Report)	34
Canada (CHUM Chart)	13
US Billboard Hot 100	10
US Cash Box Top 100	10
