= Roger Christian (songwriter) =

American songwriter and disc jockey (1934–1991)

- Born: Roger Val Christian; July 3, 1934; Buffalo, New York, U.S.
- Died: July 11, 1991 (aged 57); Tarzana, California, U.S.
- Occupations: Radio personality, songwriter
- Years active: 1950s–1991

Roger Val Christian (July 3, 1934 – July 11, 1991) was an American radio personality and songwriter from Buffalo, New York. After moving to California, he became a lyricist for the Beach Boys' Brian Wilson. From the early to mid-1960s, they wrote many songs together, mostly about cars, including the singles "Little Deuce Coupe" (1963), "Shut Down" (1963), and "Don’t Worry Baby" (1964).

== Biography ==
Christian was born in Buffalo, New York, United States. Roger Christian began his radio career in Rochester, New York at WSAY and later worked in Buffalo under the name Mike Melody. While working as a lifeguard, Christian got his break in radio after saving a radio executive's wife from drowning in a New York lake in the mid-1950s. In 1959, he moved to California, where he initially worked for a radio station in San Bernardino, KFXM-590AM.

Christian worked as a radio personality in Los Angeles in the 1960s, 1970s and 1980s. He was one of the original "Boss Jocks" when 93/KHJ debuted in 1965. He worked for other radio stations in Los Angeles, including KRLA (AM), KFWB (AM), KBLA, KGBS (AM-FM), KDAY, KRTH-FM, and KIQQ-FM.

Having raced cars until 1955, Christian had a keen interest in hot rods and became known as the "Poet of the Strip". Murry Wilson, father of three of the Beach Boys as well as their manager, heard Christian one night on KFWB explaining the group's hit song "409" to a listener on the air. Realising Christian knew a lot about cars, Murry met Christian and later sent his son Brian Wilson to meet him. Looking at some of Christian's poems about cars, the pair collaborated on "Shut Down", "Little Deuce Coupe" and later "Don't Worry Baby".

He also co-wrote many songs recorded by Jan and Dean, including "Dead Man's Curve", "The Little Old Lady from Pasadena", "Drag City", "Honolulu Lulu", "The New Girl In School", "Ride The Wild Surf", and "You Really Know How to Hurt a Guy" with Christian writing new lyrics for "Catch a Wave" that became "Sidewalk Surfin'" involving skateboarding.

Christian, along with Gary Usher, collaborated on several songs that were either featured in or specifically written for the films Beach Party, Muscle Beach Party, Bikini Beach, Ride the Wild Surf, Beach Blanket Bingo, Ski Party, Beach Ball, and Catalina Caper - including three songs for Dick Dale. Christian also made several appearances in some of these films.

He was one of the writer/narrators on the 1964 Capitol Records documentary LP The Beatles' Story.

Christian is not to be confused with Emerson Stevens, who has long used Roger Christian's name as his on-air pseudonym during his 50 years of broadcasting in Buffalo.

== Death ==
Christian died July 11, 1991, of complications of kidney and liver failure, in Tarzana, California.
