= Jan and Dean =

American musical duo

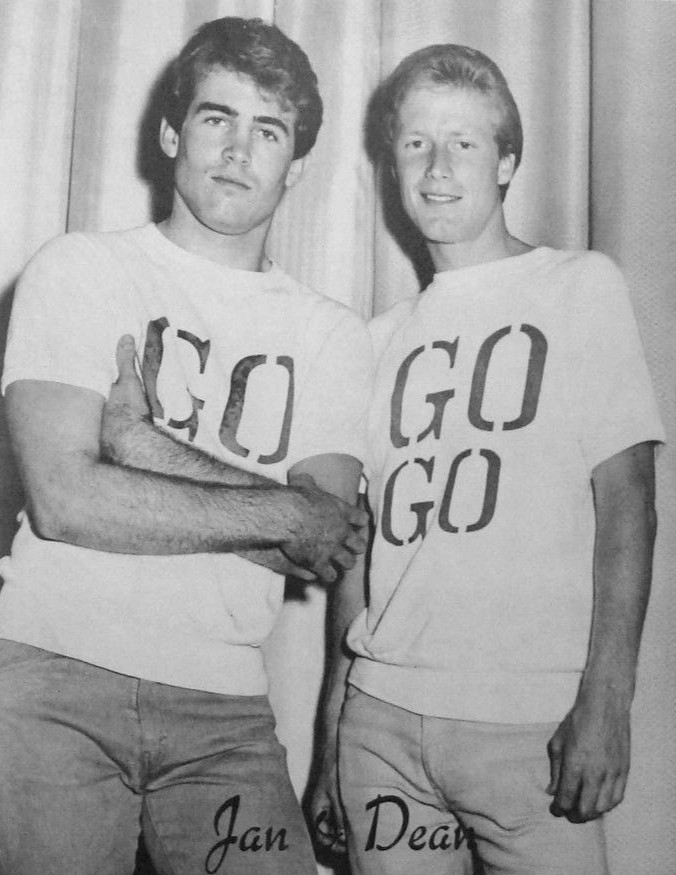
- Jan and Dean in 1964

Background information
- Also known as: Jan and Arnie (1958)
- Origin: Los Angeles, California, U.S.
- Genres: Rock; pop; surf; doo-wop (early); psychedelia (late 60s)
- Years active: 1958–1968; 1973; 1976–2004
- Labels: Arwin; Doré; Ripple; Challenge; Liberty; London; J&D; Jan & Dean; Magic-Lamp; Columbia; Warner Bros.; Brer Bird; White Whale; Sundazed
- Past members: Jan Berry; Arnie Ginsburg; Dean Torrence
- Website: www.surfcityallstars.com/torrence.html

Jan and Dean were an American vocal duo consisting of William Jan Berry (April 3, 1941 – March 26, 2004) and Dean Ormsby Torrence (born March 10, 1940). Initially a doo-wop group, they pivoted towards rock by the early 1960s, and became pioneers of the California sound and vocal surf music styles with contemporaries The Beach Boys.

Among their most successful songs was 1963's "Surf City", the first surf song to reach the number one spot on the Billboard Hot 100 in the US. Their other charting top 10 singles were "Baby Talk" (1959), "Drag City" (1963), "Dead Man's Curve" (1964; inducted into the Grammy Hall of Fame in 2008) and "The Little Old Lady (from Pasadena)" (1964).

In 1972, Torrence won the Grammy Award for Best Album Cover for the psychedelic rock band Pollution's first eponymous 1971 album, and was nominated three other times in the same category for albums of the Nitty Gritty Dirt Band. In 2013, Torrence's design contribution of the Surf City Allstars' In Concert CD was named a Silver Award of Distinction at the Communicator Awards competition.

== Early lives ==
William Jan Berry (April 3, 1941 – March 26, 2004), was born in Los Angeles to Clara Lorentze Mustad (born September 2, 1919, Bergen, Norway – died July 9, 2009) and aeronautical engineer William L. Berry (born December 7, 1909, New York City – died December 19, 2004, Camarillo, California), He was raised in Bel Air, Los Angeles. Jan's father worked for Howard Hughes as a project manager of the "Spruce Goose" and flew on its only flight with Hughes.

Dean Ormsby Torrence (born March 10, 1940 (age 86)) was born in Los Angeles, the son of Natalie Ormsby (April 10, 1911 – August 10, 2008) and Maurice Dean Torrence (December 5, 1907 – November 16, 1997). His father, Maurice, was a graduate of Stanford University, and was a sales manager at the Wilshire Oil Company.

== History ==
=== 1957–1959: formation ===
Berry and Torrence met while both were students at Emerson Junior High School in Westwood, Los Angeles, and both were on the school's football team. By 1957, they were students in the class of 1958 at the nearby University High School, where again they were both on the school's football team, the Warriors. Berry and Torrence had adjoining lockers, and after football practice, they began harmonizing together in the showers with several other football players, including future actor James Brolin.

==== The Barons ====
In order to enter a talent competition at University High School, Berry and Torrence helped form a doo-wop group known as "The Barons" (named after their high school's Hi-Y club, of which they were members), which was composed of fellow University High students William "Chuck" Steele (lead singer), Arnold P. "Arnie" Ginsburg (born November 19, 1939; 1st tenor), Wallace S. "Wally" Yagi (born July 20, 1940; 2nd tenor), John 'Sagi" Seligman (2nd tenor), with Berry singing bass and Torrence providing falsetto.

During its short duration, Sandy Nelson, Torrence's neighbor, played drums, and future Beach Boy Bruce Johnston occasionally sang and played piano. The Barons rehearsed for hours in Berry's parents' garage, where Berry's father provided an upright piano and two two-track Ampex reel-to-reel tape recorders.

In 1958, the Barons performed to popular acclaim at the talent competition at University High School, covering contemporary hits like "Get a Job", "Rock and Roll Is Here to Stay", and "Short Shorts". Following the contest, various members of the Barons drifted away, leaving only Berry and Torrence, who tried to write their own songs.

==== Jan & Arnie ====
After being inspired by a poster featuring a local Hollywood burlesque performer, Virginia Lee Hicks, who was then performing as Jennie Lee, the "Bazoom Girl", at the New Follies Burlesk at 548 S. Main St, Los Angeles, Ginsburg wrote a tribute song, "Jennie Lee", that he brought to Berry and Torrence. Berry adapted the Civil War tune "Aura Lea" and arranged the harmonies. After weeks of practice, Berry, Ginsburg, and Torrence planned to make a demo recording in Berry's garage, but Torrence was drafted into the United States Army Reserve, forcing Berry and Ginsburg to record "Jennie Lee" without Torrence, with Berry's friend and fellow University High student Donald J. Altfeld (born March 18, 1940, in Los Angeles) "beating out the rhythm on a children's metal high chair". The next day Berry took their recording to Radio Recorders, a small recording studio, to have it transferred to an acetate disc. Joe Lubin, Vice President and Head of A & R of Arwin Records, was impressed and offered to add instruments and to release it through Arwin.

In March 1958, the fathers of Berry and Ginsburg signed contracts authorizing Lubin to produce, arrange, and manage their sons.

Produced by Lubin, "Jennie Lee" (Arwin 108), backed with "Gotta Get a Date" (credited to Ginsburg, Berry & Lubin), became a surprise commercial success. According to Berry biographer Mark A. Moore, "The song (with backing vocals, plus additional instruments added by the Ernie Freeman combo) had a raucous R&B flavor, with a bouncing bomp-bomp vocal hook that would become a signature from Jan on future recordings." Distributed by Dot Records, "Jennie Lee" was released in mid-April, entered the charts on May 10, 1958, the same day they appeared on ABC's Dick Clark Show. "Jennie Lee" peaked at No. 3 on the Cash Box charts on June 21, 1958, No. 4 on the R&B charts, and No. 8 on the Billboard charts on June 30, 1958. Billy Ward and his Dominoes's R&B cover of "Jennie Lee" reached No. 55 in the Pop charts in June 1958, while other cover versions including that of Moon Mullican (Coral 9-61994) and Bobby Phillips & the Toppers (Tops 45-R422-49), released in 1958 failed to chart.

In July 1958, Jan & Arnie released their second single, "Gas Money" backed with "Bonnie Lou" (Arwin 111), both written by Berry, Ginsburg, and Altfeld. Like "Jennie Lee", "Gas Money" contained a few elements of what would later become surf music. It entered the Billboard charts on August 24, 1958, and peaked at No. 81 a week later. Jan & Arnie were a featured act on the Summer Dance Party that toured the US East Coast, including Pennsylvania, Massachusetts, and Connecticut in July 1958. By the end of the month, they traveled to Manhattan to appear on The Dick Clark Show.

On August 24, 1958, Jan & Arnie played in a live show hosted by Dick Clark that featured Bobby Darin, the Champs, Sheb Wooley, the Blossoms, the Six Teens, Jerry Wallace, Jack Jones, Rod McKuen and the Ernie Freeman Orchestra in front of nearly 12,000 fans at the first rock-n-roll show ever held at the Hollywood Bowl.

By September 6, 1958, Jan & Arnie's third and final single, "The Beat That Can't Be Beat" backed with "I Love Linda" (Arwin 113), again composed by the Berry, Ginsburg, and Altfeld team, was released. However this single failed to chart, due in part to a lack of distribution. On October 19, 1958, Jan & Arnie performed "The Beat That Can't Be Beat" on CBS's Jack Benny Show.

Arnie Ginsburg recorded a one-off single with a band named the Rituals on the Arwin label. The single, "Girl in Zanzibar" b/w "Guitarro", was released on vinyl in January 1959, preceding Jan and Dean's first single "Baby Talk", released in May 1959. Other than Arnie, the single featured Richard Podolor on guitar, Sandy Nelson on drums, Bruce Johnston on piano, Dave Shostac on sax, Harper Cosby on bass, and Mike Deasy on guitar. It is unclear if the actual single was released for the general public but there are several promotional copies pressed to vinyl in existence.

By the end of the year, when Torrence had completed his six-month stint at Fort Ord, Ginsburg had become disenchanted with the music business. Ginsburg enrolled in the School of Architecture and Design at the University of Southern California and graduated in the field of product design in 1966. After graduation Ginsburg worked for several noted Los Angeles architects, among them Charles Eames, and in December 1973 he was granted a U.S. patent for a table he designed.

Ginsburg moved in 1975 to Santa Barbara, California, where he worked as an architectural designer. designing the innovative Ginsburg House. In September 1976, Ginsburg and Michael W. O'Neill were granted a patent for a portable batting cage.

=== 1959–1962: early records ===
After Torrence returned from a six-month compulsory stint in the US Army Reserve, Berry and Torrence began to make music as "Jan and Dean". With the help of record producers Herb Alpert and Lou Adler, Jan and Dean scored a No. 10 hit on the Dore label with "Baby Talk" (1959) (which was incorrectly labeled as Jan & Arnie when it initially was released), then scored a series of hits over the next couple of years. Playing local venues, they met and performed with the Beach Boys, and discovered the appeal of the latter's "surf sound". By this time Berry was co-writing, arranging, and producing all of Jan and Dean's original material.

During this time Berry co-wrote or arranged and produced songs for other artists outside of Jan and Dean, including the Angels ("I Adore Him", Top 30), the Gents, the Matadors (Sinners), Pixie (unreleased), Jill Gibson, Shelley Fabares, Deane Hawley, the Rip Chords ("Three Window Coupe", Top 30), and Johnny Crawford, among others.

Unlike most other rock 'n roll acts of the period, Jan and Dean did not give music their full-time attention. They were college students, maintaining their studies while writing and recording music and making public appearances on the side. Torrence majored in advertising design in the school of architecture at USC, where he also was a member of the Phi Sigma Kappa fraternity. Berry took science and music classes at UCLA, became a member of Phi Gamma Delta fraternity, and entered the California College of Medicine (now the UC Irvine School of Medicine) in 1963.

=== 1963–1966: peak years ===
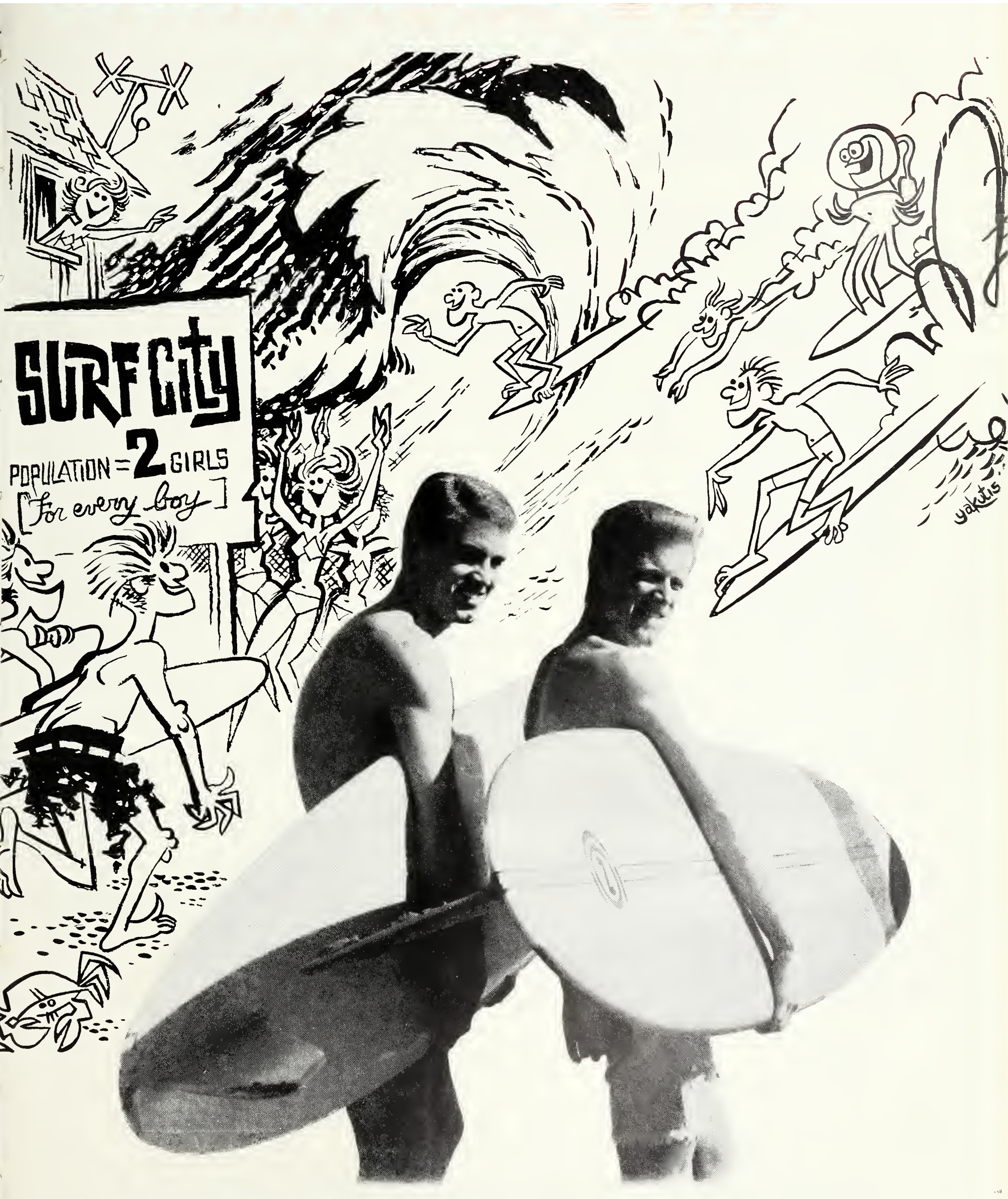
Jan and Dean on the cover of Cash Box; August 3, 1963

Jan and Dean reached their commercial peak in 1963 and 1964, after they met Brian Wilson. The duo scored sixteen Top 40 hits on the Billboard and Cash Box magazine charts, with a total of twenty-six chart hits over an eight-year period (1959-1966). Berry and Wilson collaborated on roughly a dozen hits and album cuts for Jan and Dean, including "Surf City", co-written by Jan Berry and Brian Wilson (number one, 1963). Subsequent top 10 hits included "Drag City" (number 10, 1964), the eerily portentous "Dead Man's Curve" (number 8, 1964), and "The Little Old Lady (from Pasadena)" number 3, 1964).

In 1964, at the height of their fame, Jan and Dean hosted and performed at The T.A.M.I. Show, a historic concert film directed by Steve Binder. The film also featured such acts as the Rolling Stones, Chuck Berry, Gerry & the Pacemakers, James Brown, Billy J. Kramer & the Dakotas, Marvin Gaye, the Supremes, Lesley Gore, Smokey Robinson & the Miracles and the Beach Boys. Also in 1964, the duo performed the title track for the Columbia Pictures film Ride the Wild Surf, starring Fabian Forte, Tab Hunter, Peter Brown, Shelley Fabares, and Barbara Eden. The song, penned by Jan Berry, Brian Wilson and Roger Christian, was a Top 20 national hit. The pair were also to have appeared in the film, but their roles were cut due to their association with Barry Keenan, who had engineered the Frank Sinatra Jr. kidnapping.

Jan and Dean also filmed two unreleased television pilots: Surf Scene in 1963 and On the Run in 1966. Their feature film for Paramount Pictures, Easy Come, Easy Go was canceled when Berry, as well as the film's director and other crew members, were seriously injured in a railroad accident while shooting the film in Chatsworth, California, in August 1965.

After the surfing craze, Jan and Dean scored two Top 30 hits in 1965: "You Really Know How to Hurt a Guy" got up to 27 and "I Found a Girl" got to 30—the latter from the album Folk 'n Roll. During this period, they also began to experiment with cutting-edge comedy concepts such as the original (unreleased) Filet of Soul and Jan & Dean Meet Batman. The former's album cover shows Berry with his leg in a cast as a result of the accident while filming Easy Come, Easy Go.

In 1965, Jan Berry recorded "The Universal Coward", an angry response to Donovan’s anti-war single "Universal Soldier" (originally written by Buffy Sainte-Marie).

=== 1966–1968: Berry's car wreck ===
On April 12, 1966, Berry received severe head injuries in an automobile accident on Whittier Drive, just a short distance from Dead Man's Curve in Beverly Hills, California, two years after the song had become a hit. He was en route to a business meeting when he crashed his Corvette into a parked truck on Whittier Drive, near the intersection of Sunset Boulevard, in Beverly Hills. Berry also had separated from his girlfriend of seven years, singer-artist Jill Gibson, later a member of the Mamas & the Papas for a short time, who also had co-written several songs with him. He was in a coma for more than two months before finally awakening on the morning of June 16.

Berry recovered from brain damage and partial paralysis. He had limited use of his right arm, and had to learn to write with his left hand as well as learning to walk again.

In Berry's absence, Torrence released several singles on the J&D Record Co. label and recorded Save for a Rainy Day in 1966, a concept album featuring all rain-themed songs. Torrence posed with Berry's brother Ken for the album cover photos. Columbia Records released one single from the project ("Yellow Balloon") as did the song's writer, Gary Zekley, with the group the Yellow Balloon.

The album cover to Pollution, designed by Torrence, won a Grammy Award for Best Album Cover in 1971.

Besides his studio work, Torrence became a graphic artist, starting his own company, Kittyhawk Graphics, and designing and creating album covers and logos for other musicians and recording artists, including Harry Nilsson, Steve Martin, the Nitty Gritty Dirt Band, Michael Nesmith, Dennis Wilson, Bruce Johnston, the Beach Boys, Diana Ross and the Supremes, Linda Ronstadt, Canned Heat, the Ventures and many others. Torrence (with Gene Brownell) won a Grammy Award for "Album Cover of the Year" in 1971, for the album Pollution by Pollution on Prophesy Records.

Berry returned to the studio in April 1967, almost one year to the day after his accident. Working with Alan Wolfson, he began writing and producing music again. In December 1967, Jan and Dean signed an agreement with Warner Bros. Records. Warner issued three singles under the name "Jan and Dean", but a 1968 Berry-produced album for Warner Bros., the psychedelic Carnival of Sound, remained unreleased until February 2010, when Rhino Records' "Handmade" label put out CD and vinyl compilations of all tracks recorded for Carnival, along with various outtakes and remixes from the project.

=== Later years ===
In 1971, Jan and Dean released the album Jan & Dean Anthology Album under the label United Artists Records. The album included many of their top hits, starting with 1958's "Jennie Lee" and ending with 1968's "Vegetables".

Berry began to sing again in the early 1970s, touring with his Aloha band, while Torrence began performing with a band called Papa Doo Run Run.

On August 26, 1973, Torrence was scheduled to appear at the Hollywood Palladium as part of Jim Pewter's "Surfer's Stomp" reunion. Torrence had recently released some Jan & Dean songs with new vocal parts by Bruce Johnston (of the Beach Boys) and producer Terry Melcher under the moniker the Legendary Masked Surfers. Torrence arranged with Berry to join him lip-syncing on stage to a pre-recorded track. The two anticipated that the audience would know it was a tape recording, and they decided to make light of it during the performance. That night, they joked around and stopped lip-syncing on stage while the music continued, but the audience became angry and started booing. The duo's first live performance after Berry's accident occurred at the Palomino Nightclub in North Hollywood on June 5, 1976, ten years after the accident, as guests of Disneyland regulars Papa Doo Run Run. Their first actual multi-song concert billed as Jan and Dean took place in 1978 in New York City at the Palladium as part of the Murray the K Brooklyn Fox Reunion Show. This was followed by a handful of East Coast shows as guests of their longtime friends the Beach Boys. Four nationwide J & D headlining tours followed through 1980. Berry was still suffering the effects of his 1966 accident, with partial paralysis and aphasia.

The duo experienced a resurgence after Paul Morantz's "Road back from Deadman's Curve" article appeared in Rolling Stone in 1974, writing the piece after spending extensive time with the two singers, their families, doctors and associates. Morantz first submitted the story to Playboy, who recommended it to Rolling Stone. He then wrote a film treatment from his story which was purchased by CBS.

On February 3, 1978, CBS aired a made-for-TV film about the duo titled Deadman's Curve. The biopic starred Richard Hatch as Jan Berry and Bruce Davison as Dean Torrence, with cameo appearances by Dick Clark, Wolfman Jack, Mike Love of the Beach Boys, and Bruce Johnston (who at that time was temporarily out of the Beach Boys), as well as Berry himself. Near the end of the film he can be seen sitting in the audience, watching "himself" (Richard Hatch) perform onstage. The part of Jan and Dean's band was played by Papa Doo Run Run, which included Mark Ward and Jim Armstrong, who went on to form Jan and Dean and the Bel-Air Bandits. Johnston and Berry had known each other since high school, and had played music together in Berry's garage in Bel Air — long before Jan and Dean or the Beach Boys were formed. Following the release of the film, the duo made steps toward an official comeback that year, including touring with the Beach Boys, and performing with Papa Doo Run Run at Cupertino High School. In the Netherlands the showing on television of the movie by Veronica in August 1979 earned them a huge hit record of the re-recorded "Surf City" and "Deadman's Curve" songs as a double A-sided single record release, and a golden oldies record having "The Little Old Lady From Pasadena" as its flip side reached a lower position in the charts.

In the early 1980s, Papa Doo Run Run left to explore other performance and recording ventures. Berry struggled to overcome drug addiction. In 1979, Berry had performed over 100 concerts of Jan and Dean songs with another front man from Hawaii, Randy Ruff. Torrence also toured briefly as "Mike & Dean", with Mike Love of the Beach Boys. Later, the duo reunited for good. In "Phase II" of their career, Torrence led the touring operation.

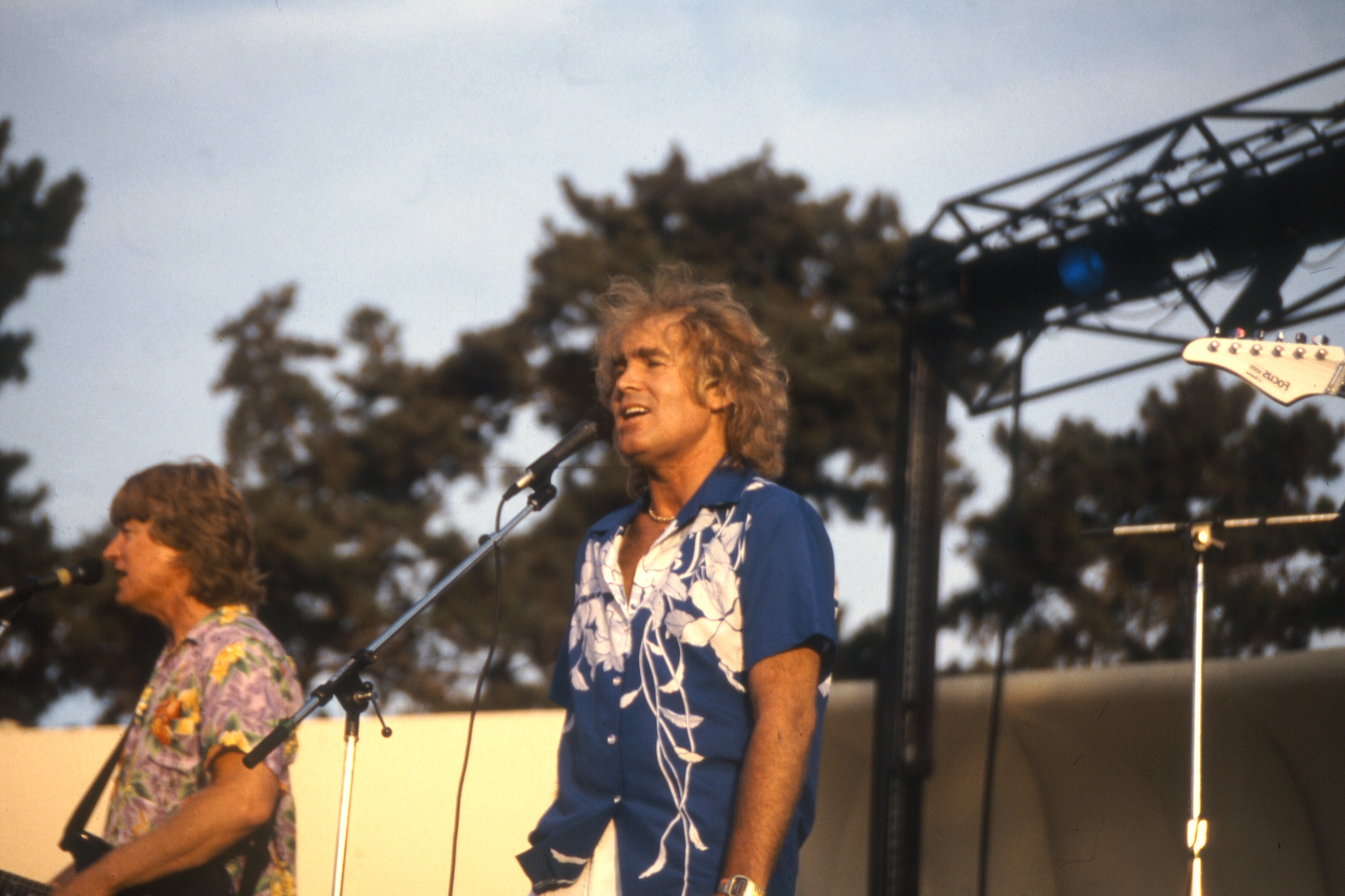
Torrence and Berry in 1985

Jan and Dean continued to tour on their own throughout the 1980s, the 1990s, and into the new millennium – with 1960s nostalgia providing them with a ready audience, headlining oldies shows throughout North America. Sundazed Music reissued Torrence's Save for a Rainy Day in 1996 in CD and vinyl formats, as well as the collector's vinyl 45 rpm companion EP, "Sounds For A Rainy Day", featuring four instrumental versions of the album's tracks.

Between the 1970s and the early 2000s, Torrence issued a number of re-recordings of classic Jan and Dean and Beach Boys hits. A double album titled One Summer Night / Live was issued by Rhino Records in 1982. Torrence released the album Silver Summer with the help of Mike Love in 1985 for Jan & Dean's 25th anniversary. Silver Summer was officially released as a Jan & Dean album, but falsely gives credit to Berry as co-producer and singer; Berry did not contribute to the album. Torrence participated with Berry on Port to Paradise, released as a cassette on the J&D Records label in 1986. In 1997, after many years of hard work, Berry released a solo album called Second Wave on One Way Records. June 11, 2002, Torrence released a solo album titled Anthology: Legendary Masked Surfer Unmasked.

On August 31, 1991, Berry married Gertie Filip at the Stardust Convention Centre in Las Vegas, Nevada. Torrence was Berry's best man at the wedding.

==== Berry's death ====
Berry died on March 26, 2004, as the result of a seizure, at age 62. He was an organ donor and his body was cremated. On April 18, a "Celebration of Life" was held in Berry's memory at the Roxy Theatre on the Sunset Strip in West Hollywood, California. Attendees included Torrence, Lou Adler, Jill Gibson, and Nancy Sinatra, along with many family members, friends, and musicians associated with Jan and Dean and the Beach Boys, including the original members of Papa Doo Run Run.

In February 2010, the Jan and Dean album Carnival of Sound was released on the Rhino Handmade label. The album cover was designed by Torrence. Along with the CD, there was a limited edition (1500 copies), which included a 10-track LP. The album was released in Europe in April 2010 in its original US form.

In 2012, Torrence reunited with Bruce Davison, who portrayed him in the 1978 film Deadman's Curve, to perform with the Bamboo Trading Company on their From Kitty Hawk To Surf City album. The songs were "Shrewd Awakening" and "Tonga Hut", which was featured on the film Return of the Killer Shrews, a sequel to the 1959 film The Killer Shrews and also "Tweet (Don't Talk Anymore)", "Drinkin' In the Sunshine", and "Star Of The Beach". The album also features Dean's two daughters, Jillian and Katie Torrence; the three of them were featured in the music video of "Shrewd Awakening".

After Berry's death, Torrence began touring occasionally with the Surf City All-Stars. He serves as a spokesman for the City of Huntington Beach, California, which, thanks in part to his efforts, is nationally recognized as "Surf City USA". Torrence's website features—among other things—rare images, a complete Jan and Dean discography, a biography, and a timeline of his career with cohort Jan Berry. He currently resides in Huntington Beach, California, with his wife and two daughters.

== Members ==
- Jan Berry – baritone lead & backing vocals (1958–1966, 1967–1968, one off in 1973, 1976–2004; his death)
- Arnie Ginsburg – tenor vocals (1958–1959)
- Dean Torrence – tenor backing & lead vocals, guitar (1958, 1959–1967, one off in 1973, 1976–2004)

== Legacy ==
In 1964, Jan and Dean were signed to host what became the first multi-act rock and roll show that was edited into a motion picture designed for wide distribution. The T.A.M.I. Show became a seminal and original production – in essence one of the first rock videos – on its release in 1964. Using a high-resolution videotape process called Electronovision (transferred from television directly onto 35mm motion picture stock as a kinescope), new sound recording techniques and having a remarkable cast, The T.A.M.I. Show set the standard for all succeeding music film and video work, including many of the early videos shown by MTV 17 years later. The revolutionary technical achievements of The T.A.M.I. Show and the list of performers (including a performance by James Brown that many critics have called the best of his career) marked a high point for Jan and Dean, as they were the hosts and one of the main featured acts as well. They became one of the main faces of mid-1960s music, until Berry's auto accident two years later, through their T.A.M.I. Show appearance.

According to rock critic Dave Marsh, the attitude and public persona of punk rock can be traced to Jan and Dean.

Brian Wilson has cited Berry as having a direct impact on his own growth as a record producer.

In an interview conducted by Jan and Dean fan and historian David Beard for the Collectors' Choice release, Jan & Dean, the Complete Liberty Singles, Dean Torrence stated that he felt the duo should be in the Rock & Roll Hall of Fame: "We have the scoreboard if you just want to compare number of hits and musical projects done. We beat 75 percent of the people in there. So what else is it? I've got to think that we were pretty irreverent when it came to the music industry. They kind of always held that against us. That's okay with me."

Jan and Dean were inducted into the Hollywood Rock Walk of Fame on April 12, 1996, exactly 30 years after Jan Berry had his near fatal car accident.

On January 28, 2023, Jan and Dean were inducted into the California Music Hall Of Fame.

The Who covered Jan and Dean's "Bucket T" on their UK EP Ready Steady Who from 1966, one of only a few songs the group performed where surf fan Keith Moon provided the lead vocals.

Alternative rock group the Red Hot Chili Peppers referenced the duo in their song "Did I Let You Know", on the album I'm with You.

== Discography ==
- The Jan and Dean Sound (1960)
- Jan & Dean Take Linda Surfin' (1963)
- Surf City and Other Swingin' Cities (1963)
- Drag City (1963)
- Dead Man's Curve / The New Girl in School (1964)
- Ride the Wild Surf (1964)
- The Little Old Lady from Pasadena (1964)
- Folk 'n Roll (1965)
- Jan & Dean Meet Batman (1966)
- Filet of Soul: A "Live" One (1966; live/studio)
- Save for a Rainy Day (November 1966; Torrence only)
- Carnival of Sound (2010; recorded 1966–68)
- Port to Paradise (1986)
- Filet of Soul Redux: The Rejected Master Recordings (2017)
