= The Little Old Lady (from Pasadena) =

Single by Jan and Dean

from the album The Little Old Lady From Pasadena
- B-side: "My Mighty G.T.O."
- Released: June 8, 1964
- Recorded: March 21-May 18, 1964
- Studio: United Western (Hollywood, California)
- Genre: Car song
- Length: 2:45
- Label: Liberty
- Songwriters: Jan Berry, Don Altfeld, Roger Christian
- Producers: Jan Berry for Screen Gems, Inc.

Jan and Dean singles chronology
"Dead Man's Curve" (1964)	"The Little Old Lady (from Pasadena)" (1964)	"Ride the Wild Surf" (1964)

"The Little Old Lady (from Pasadena)" is a song written by Don Altfeld, Jan Berry and Roger Christian, and recorded by 1960s American pop singers Jan and Dean.

== Background and recording ==
The origins of "The Little Old Lady (from Pasadena)" stem from a very popular Dodge ad campaign in southern California that launched in early 1964. Starring actress Kathryn Minner, the commercials showed the white-haired elderly lady speeding down the street (and sometimes a drag strip) driving a modified Dodge. She would stop, look out the window and say "Put a Dodge in your garage, Hon-ey!". The song soon followed and Minner enjoyed great popularity until she died in 1969.

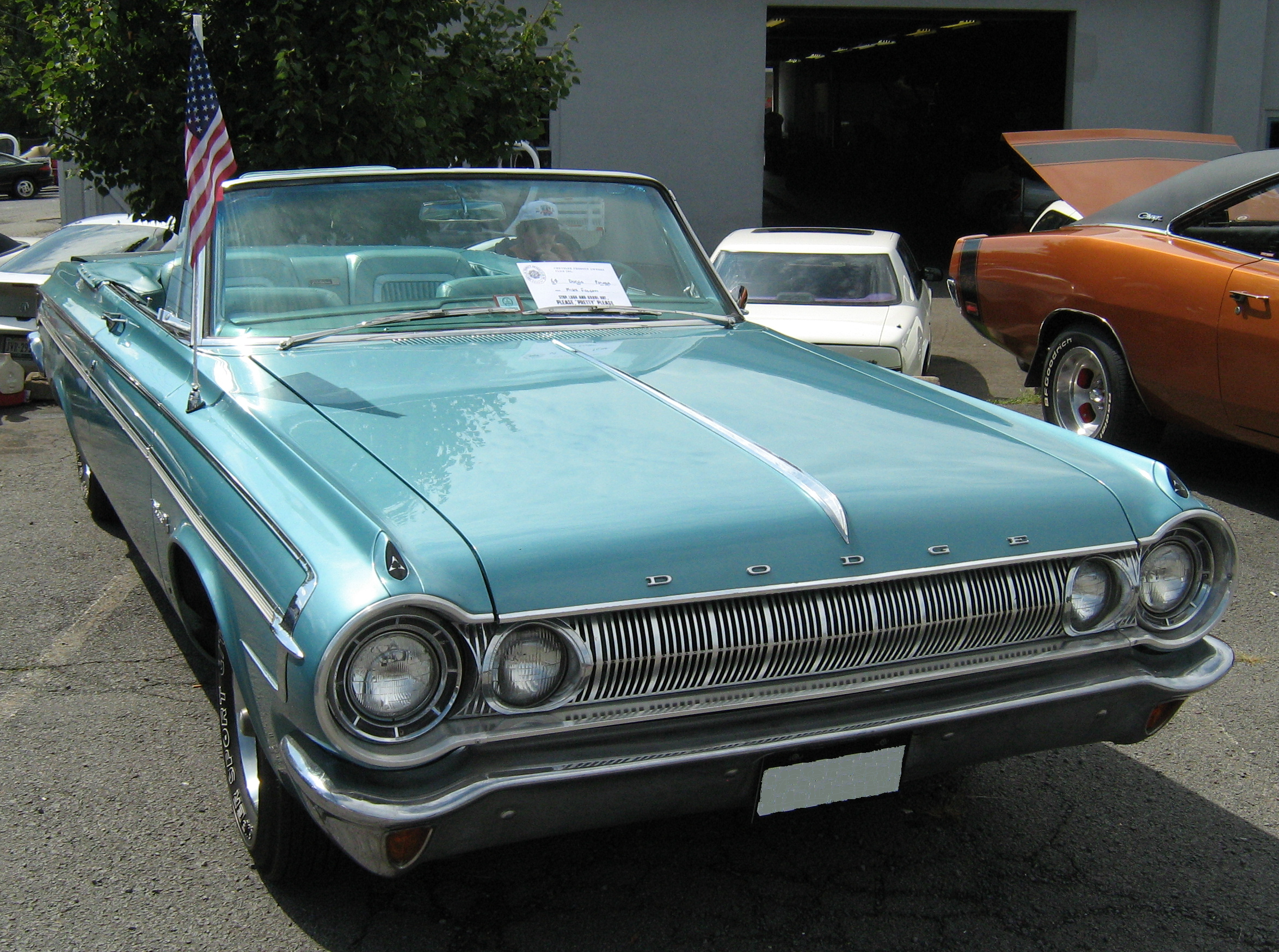
A 1964 Dodge Polara 500 convertible

"The Little Old Lady (from Pasadena)" was a folk archetype in Southern California in the mid-20th century. Part of this lore was that many an elderly man who died in Pasadena would leave his widow with a powerful car that she rarely, if ever, drove, such as an old Buick Roadmaster or a vintage 1950s Cadillac, Ford, Packard, Studebaker or DeSoto. Supposedly, used car salesmen would tell prospective buyers that a vehicle's previous owner was "a little old lady from Pasadena who only drove it to church on Sundays," thus suggesting the car had little wear.

On March 21, 1964, the song's backing track was recorded at Western Recorders. On April 6, Phil Sloan and Steve Barri added falsetto and harmony vocals to the song. On May 14, Jan Berry, Sloan and Barri participated in a vocal overdub session at United Recording. On May 18, Dean Torrence joined Berry, Sloan and Barri at a vocal overdub session, also held at United. During a take, Torrence recorded an unused "experimental lead falsetto". Sloan performed the falsetto lead on the final version. Part of the song's third verse was later replaced by a harmonica solo.

=== Authorship ===
The song was originally published by Lou Adler's company, Trousdale Music, and credited solely to co-writers Don Altfeld and Roger Christian. Jan Berry had an exclusive songwriting contract with Screen Gems, and was not listed as co-writer on the song's copyright registration or its single release. According to Mark A. Moore, Berry had wanted to work with other publishers, and intended to retain ownership of the song via Trousdale Music. Shortly after the song was released, Berry was contacted by Screen Gems regarding the matter, and denied having written the song.

On June 15, 1964, Screen Gems and its music publishing division, Screen Gems-Columbia Music, sued Berry, Adler, Liberty Records and other parties for numerous contractual violations. Screen Gems claimed rights to "The Little Old Lady" and attempted to block distribution of the single. When the lawsuit was settled in July, Screen Gems acquired the rights to "The Little Old Lady" from Trousdale Music, and Berry "relinquished any and all rights or claims he may have had" to the song. Co-writers Altfeld and Christian each shared 50% of the song's royalties. In the early 2000s, Altfeld was involved in getting Berry's writing credits restored to the song, and assigned half of his royalty share to Berry.

== Release and reception ==
Liberty Records released "The Little Old Lady (from Pasadena)" as a single on June 8, 1964, with "My Mighty G.T.O." as the B-side. "The Little Old Lady" charted at number three on the Billboard Hot 100, and reached number one on Canada's RPM Top-Forty 5s chart. In September, "The Little Old Lady" appeared on the album The Little Old Lady from Pasadena.

On September 2, Jan and Dean performed the song on The Lloyd Thaxton Show. Jan and Dean also performed the song in the 1964 concert film T.A.M.I. Show. During the performance, Torrence rode a "Jan & Dean's Sidewalk Surfer"-branded skateboard on stage, which he kept in a guitar case. In January 1965, a live version of the song recorded at the Sacramento National Auditorium appeared on the album Command Performance/Live in Person.

Ritchie Unterberger called "The Little Old Lady (from Pasadena" "[j]ust as giddy and catchy as the Beach Boys' big 1963-1964 hits", and noted that the song had "a clever lyrical twist, almost self-consciously mocking in its tone".

== Other versions ==
The Beach Boys recorded a cover of "The Little Old Lady (from Pasadena)", which was featured on their 1964 album Beach Boys Concert. The group's cover included the complete third verse. In January 1966, the Beach Boys' version charted at number seven in the Philippines. In 1968, Irish group the Freshmen recorded a cover of the song titled "Go Granny Go". The song appeared on the group's first album Movin' On. The Mid-Ulster Mail described the song as a "racy, surfin' number which is bound to get a terrific ballroom reaction". The single reached number 12 on the Irish Singles Chart.

== Legacy ==
In 1967, Jan and Dean recorded "Tijuana", which reused the backing track from "The Little Old Lady (from Pasadena)". The song was released as the B-side of their single "Hawaii". Berry, Glen Campbell, and Tony Minichiello provided vocals. The lyrics contained thinly veiled references to marijuana use. Screen Gems blocked further distribution of the single, as Berry used the "Little Old Lady" backing track without permission. "Tijuana" was to be included on the Jan and Dean album Carnival of Sound, completed in 1968, but unreleased until 2010.

During the mid-1980s, the song's co-writer Don Altfeld founded Little Old Lady From Pasadena Enterprises, Inc. to market the character. Altfeld also trademarked the song's title.

In June 1984, Altfeld crowned actress Ethel Sway as the "official" Little Old Lady from Pasadena. Sway was to appear in a music video for the song. Lenore Woodward was the contest's runner-up. In 1985, Sway was also set to star in a planned film based on the song. In November 1985, Woodward was described as the "likeliest lead" of the film Go, Granny, Go!, to be directed by Jean-Paul Ouellette. Woodward, who had substituted for Sway as the Little Old Lady at some events, later became the "official" Little Old Lady from Pasadena.

== Personnel ==
Per Mark A. Moore.

- Jan Berry - vocals
- Dean Torrence - vocals

Other musicians

- Hal Blaine - contractor
- Jimmy Bond
- Russell Bridges
- Earl Palmer
- Bill Pitman
- Ray Pohlman
- Billy Strange
- Tommy Tedesco
- Phil Sloan - vocals
- Steve Barri - vocals

Production

- Jan Berry - arranger, producer
- Lanky Linstrot - engineer
- Bones Howe - engineer
- Lou Adler - recording manager

== Chart performance ==
Chart (1964)	Peak position
Australia (Kent Music Report)	5
Canada R.P.M. Top Forty-5s	1
New Zealand (Lever Hit Parade)	5
U.S. Billboard Hot 100	3
U.S. Cash Box Top 100	5
