= Billboard Year-End Hot 100 singles of 1963 =

Ranking of recorded music

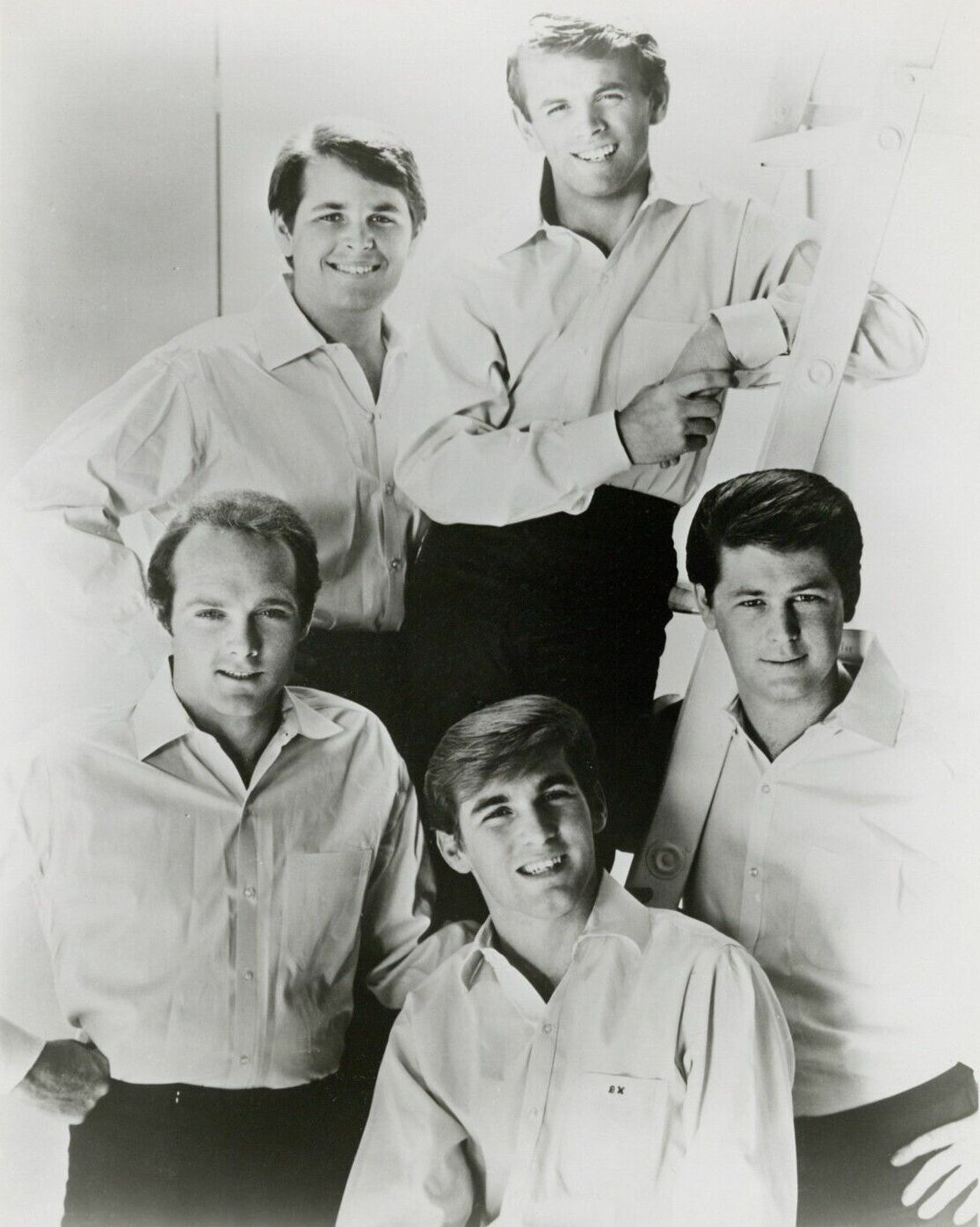
The Beach Boys had two songs on the Year-End Hot 100, including "Surfin' U.S.A.", the number one song of 1963.

This is a list of Billboard magazine's Top Hot 100 songs of 1963, as featured in the December 28, 1963 issue of Billboard.

No.	Title	Artist(s)
1	"Surfin' U.S.A."	The Beach Boys
2	"The End of the World"	Skeeter Davis
3	"Rhythm of the Rain"	The Cascades
4	"He's So Fine"	The Chiffons
5	"Blue Velvet"	Bobby Vinton
6	"Hey Paula"	Paul & Paula
7	"Fingertips – Part 2"	Little Stevie Wonder
8	"Can't Get Used to Losing You"	Andy Williams
9	"My Boyfriend's Back"	The Angels
10	"Sukiyaki"	Kyu Sakamoto
11	"So Much in Love"	The Tymes
12	"Puff, the Magic Dragon"	Peter, Paul and Mary
13	"Blowin' in the Wind"	Peter, Paul and Mary
14	"Wipe Out"	The Surfaris
15	"I Love You Because"	Al Martino
16	"Wild Weekend"	The Rebels
17	"You're the Reason I'm Living"	Bobby Darin
18	"Walk Like a Man"	The Four Seasons
19	"Mockingbird"	Inez and Charlie Foxx
20	"I Will Follow Him"	Little Peggy March
21	"Pipeline"	The Chantays
22	"Surf City"	Jan and Dean
23	"It's My Party"	Lesley Gore
24	"Blame It on the Bossa Nova"	Eydie Gormé
25	"You Can't Sit Down"	The Dovells
26	"Heat Wave"	Martha and the Vandellas
27	"Denise"	Randy & the Rainbows
28	"Walk Right In"	The Rooftop Singers
29	"If You Wanna Be Happy"	Jimmy Soul
30	"If I Had a Hammer"	Trini Lopez
31	"Easier Said Than Done"	The Essex
32	"Ruby Baby"	Dion
33	"Our Day Will Come"	Ruby & the Romantics
34	"Hello Stranger"	Barbara Lewis
35	"Be My Baby"	The Ronettes
36	"South Street"	The Orlons
37	"Days of Wine and Roses"	Henry Mancini
38	"The Monkey Time"	Major Lance
39	"Candy Girl"	The Four Seasons
40	"Sugar Shack"	Jimmy Gilmer and the Fireballs
41	"Still"	Bill Anderson
42	"Blue on Blue"	Bobby Vinton
43	"Cry Baby"	Garnet Mimms & the Enchanters
44	"Two Faces Have I"	Lou Christie
45	"Busted"	Ray Charles
46	"Da Doo Ron Ron"	The Crystals
47	"Foolish Little Girl"	The Shirelles
48	"Memphis"	Lonnie Mack
49	"In Dreams"	Roy Orbison
50	"More"	Kai Winding
51	"I Can't Stay Mad at You"	Skeeter Davis
52	"Losing You"	Brenda Lee
53	"Mean Woman Blues"	Roy Orbison
54	"Our Winter Love"	Bill Pursell
55	"I Wanna Be Around"	Tony Bennett
56	"You've Really Got a Hold on Me"	The Miracles
57	"Sally Go 'Round the Roses"	The Jaynetts
58	"(You're the) Devil in Disguise"	Elvis Presley
59	"Those Lazy-Hazy-Crazy Days of Summer"	Nat King Cole
60	"Baby Workout"	Jackie Wilson
61	"Pride and Joy"	Marvin Gaye
62	"Deep Purple"	Nino Tempo & April Stevens
63	"From a Jack to a King"	Ned Miller
64	"Up on the Roof"	The Drifters
65	"What Will Mary Say"	Johnny Mathis
66	"Mama Didn't Lie"	Jan Bradley
67	"The Night Has a Thousand Eyes"	Bobby Vee
68	"Don't Say Nothin' Bad (About My Baby)"	The Cookies
69	"Ring of Fire"	Johnny Cash
70	"Just One Look"	Doris Troy
71	"Hello Muddah, Hello Fadduh (A Letter from Camp)"	Allan Sherman
72	"Judy's Turn to Cry"	Lesley Gore
73	"Tie Me Kangaroo Down, Sport"	Rolf Harris
74	"Fools Rush In"	Rick Nelson
75	"Washington Square"	The Village Stompers
76	"Donna the Prima Donna"	Dion
77	"That Sunday, That Summer"	Nat King Cole
78	"Another Saturday Night"	Sam Cooke
79	"Painted, Tainted Rose"	Al Martino
80	"Go Away Little Girl"	Steve Lawrence
81	"Take These Chains from My Heart"	Ray Charles
82	"Talk to Me"	Sunny & the Sunglows
83	"Come and Get These Memories"	Martha and the Vandellas
84	"Do the Bird"	Dee Dee Sharp
85	"It's All Right"	The Impressions
86	"Shut Down"	The Beach Boys
87	"One Fine Day"	The Chiffons
88	"Little Town Flirt"	Del Shannon
89	"Fly Me to the Moon"	Joe Harnell
90	"The Reverend Mr. Black"	The Kingston Trio
91	"Hot Pastrami"	The Dartells
92	"Martian Hop"	The Ran-Dells
93	"Wonderful! Wonderful!"	The Tymes
94	"Abilene"	George Hamilton IV
95	"Part Time Love"	Little Johnny Taylor
96	"Maria Elena"	Los Indios Tabajaras
97	"Detroit City"	Bobby Bare
98	"Twenty Miles"	Chubby Checker
99	"Green, Green"	The New Christy Minstrels
100	"Hey Girl"	Freddie Scott

== See also ==
- 1963 in music
- List of Billboard Hot 100 number-one singles of 1963
- List of Billboard Hot 100 top-ten singles in 1963
