= Billboard year-end top 50 R&B singles of 1963 =

Billboard year-end top 50 R&B singles of 1963 is the year-end chart compiled by Billboard magazine ranking the top rhythm and blues singles of 1963. The list was based on charts from the January 6 through the November 23 issues.

"Part Time Love" by Little Johnny Taylor ranked as the year's top R&B single. It was Taylor's only top 40 pop entry, reaching number 19 on the pop chart.

Motown and its affiliated divisions (Tamla and Gordy) emerged as a leading force with six of the year's top 20 R&B singles. Top hits from the Motown group included "Fingertips (Part II)" by Little Stevie Wonder (No. 4), "Heat Wave" (No. 5) and "Come and Get These Memories" (No. 50) by Martha and the Vandellas, "Pride and Joy" by Marvin Gaye (No. 6), "You've Really Got a Hold on Me" by The Miracles (No. 9), "Two Lovers" by Mary Wells (No. 17), and "Mickey's Monkey" by The Miracles (No. 19).

Several singles by white artists were included in the list including "Walk Like a Man" by The Four Seasons (No. 20), "Hey Paula" by Paul & Paula (No. 21), "I Will Follow Him" by Little Peggy March (No. 22), Ruby Baby" by Dion (No. 24), "It's My Party" by Lesley Gore (No. 26), "Sugar Shack" by Jimmy Gilmer and the Fireballs (No. 27), and "My Boyfriend's Back" by The Angels (No. 30).

R&B rank	Peak	Title	Artist(s)	Label
1	1	"Part Time Love"	Little Johnny Taylor	Galaxy
2	2	"Mockingbird"	Inez Foxx	Symbol
3	1	"Baby Workout"	Jackie Wilson	Brunswick
4	1	"Fingertips (Part II)"	Little Stevie Wonder	Tamla
5	1	"Heat Wave"	Martha and the Vandellas	Gordy
6	2	"Pride and Joy"	Marvin Gaye	Tamla
7	3	"The Love of My Man"	Theola Kilgore	Serock
8	1	"Cry Baby"	Garnet Mimms	United Artists
9	1	"You've Really Got a Hold on Me"	The Miracles	Tamla
10	1	"Hello Stranger"	Barbara Lewis	Atlantic
11	3	"Just One Look"	Doris Troy	Atlantic
12	2	"The Monkey Time"	Major Lance	Okeh
13	1	"That's the Way Love Is"	Bobby Bland	Duke
14	1	"Our Day Will Come"	Ruby & the Romantics	Kapp
15	1	"He's So Fine"	The Chiffons	Laurie
16	1	"If You Wanna Be Happy"	Jimmy Soul	S.P.Q.R.
17	1	"Two Lovers"	Mary Wells	Motown
18	1	"Easier Said Than Done"	The Essex	Roulette
19	3	"Mickey's Monkey"	The Miracles	Tamla
20	3	"Walk Like a Man"	The Four Seasons	Vee Jay
21	1	"Hey Paula"	Paul & Paula	Philips
22	1	"I Will Follow Him"	Little Peggy March	RCA Victor
23	4	"South Street"	The Orlons	Cameo
24	5	"Ruby Baby"	Dion	Columbia
25	6	"Call on Me"	Bobby Bland	Duke
26	1	"It's My Party"	Lesley Gore	Mercury
27	1	"Sugar Shack"	Jimmy Gilmer and the Fireballs	Dot
28	2	"Hotel Happiness"	Brook Benton	Mercury
29	1	"Another Saturday Night"	Sam Cooke	RCA Victor
30	2	"My Boyfriend's Back"	The Angels	Smash
31	3	"Busted"	Ray Charles	ABC Paramount
32	3	"Don't Say Nothin' Bad (About My Baby)"	The Cookies	Dimension
33	4	"Frankie and Johnny"	Sam Cooke	RCA Victor
34	8	"Mama Didn't Lie"	Jan Bradley	Chess
35	7	"It's Too Late"	Wilson Pickett	Double L
36	3	"Surf City"	Jan and Dean	Liberty
37	2	"Send Me Some Lovin'"	Sam Cooke	RCA Victor
38	2	"If You Need Me"	Solomon Burke	Atlantic
39	4	"Walk Right In"	The Rooftop Singers	Vanguard
40	4	"So Much in Love"	The Tymes	Parkway
41	4	"Sally Go 'Round the Roses"	The Jaynetts	Tuff
42	7	"Pushover"	Etta James	Argo
43	7	"Rhythm of the Rain"	The Cascades	Valiant
44	6	"Prisoner of Love"	James Brown	King
45	4	"The End of the World"	Skeeter Davis	RCA Victor
46	5	"Don't Make Me Over"	Dionne Warwick	Scepter
47	1	"You Are My Sunshine"	Ray Charles	ABC Paramount
48	4	"Be My Baby"	The Ronettes	Philles
49	6	"Loop de Loop"	Johnny Thunder	Diamond
50	6	"Come and Get These Memories"	Martha and the Vandellas	Gordy
50	5	"Tell Him"	The Exciters	United Artists

== See also ==
- List of Hot R&B Singles number ones of 1963
- Billboard Year-End Hot 100 singles of 1963
- 1963 in music
