= List of Billboard Hot 100 top-ten singles in 1963 =

This is a list of singles that charted in the top ten of the Billboard Hot 100 during 1963.

Bobby Vinton, Lesley Gore, Peter, Paul and Mary, Dion, The Four Seasons, The Beach Boys, and Elvis Presley each had three top-ten hits in 1963, tying them for the most top-ten hits during the year.

== Top-ten singles ==
- (#) – 1963 Year-end top 10 single position and rank

Top ten entry date	Single	Artist(s)	Peak	Peak date	Weeks in top ten
Singles from 1962
December 15	"Go Away Little Girl"	Steve Lawrence	1	January 12	9
December 29	"Hotel Happiness"	Brook Benton	3	January 19	4
December 29	"Zip-a-Dee-Doo-Dah"	Bob B. Soxx & the Blue Jeans	8	January 12	3
Singles from 1963
January 5	"Tell Him"	The Exciters	4	January 19	5
January 5	"Pepino the Italian Mouse"	Lou Monte	5	January 12	3
January 12	"The Night Has a Thousand Eyes"	Bobby Vee	3	February 2	6
January 12	"My Dad"	Paul Petersen	6	January 26	4
January 12	"Two Lovers"	Mary Wells	7	January 19	4
January 19	"Hey Paula" (#6)	Paul & Paula	1	February 9	9
January 26	"Walk Right In"	The Rooftop Singers	1	January 26	7
January 26	"It's Up to You"	Rick Nelson	6	February 2	2
February 2	"Loop de Loop"	Johnny Thunder	4	February 9	3
February 2	"Up on the Roof"	The Drifters	5	February 9	3
February 9	"Walk Like a Man"	The Four Seasons	1	March 2	7
February 9	"Ruby Baby"	Dion	2	February 23	6
February 9	"Rhythm of the Rain" (#3)	The Cascades	3	March 9	9
February 9	"You've Really Got a Hold on Me"	The Miracles	8	February 9	3
February 16	"From a Jack to a King"	Ned Miller	6	February 16	3
February 23	"You're the Reason I'm Living"	Bobby Darin	3	March 16	7
February 23	"Blame It on the Bossa Nova"	Eydie Gormé	7	March 2	5
February 23	"Wild Weekend"	The Rebels	8	March 9	3
March 2	"What Will My Mary Say"	Johnny Mathis	9	March 9	4
March 9	"Our Day Will Come"	Ruby & the Romantics	1	March 23	6
March 9	"The End of the World" (#2)	Skeeter Davis	2	March 23	6
March 16	"He's So Fine" (#4)	The Chiffons	1	March 30	9
March 23	"South Street"	The Orlons	3	April 13	5
March 23	"In Dreams"	Roy Orbison	7	March 30	3
March 30	"Baby Workout"	Jackie Wilson	5	April 13	5
March 30	"Our Winter Love"	Bill Pursell	9	March 30	1
April 6	"Can't Get Used to Losing You" (#8)	Andy Williams	2	April 13	7
April 6	"Young Lovers"	Paul & Paula	6	April 20	4
April 13	"I Will Follow Him"	Little Peggy March	1	April 27	8
April 13	"Puff, the Magic Dragon"	Peter, Paul and Mary	2	May 11	6
April 13	"Do the Bird"	Dee Dee Sharp	10	April 13	2
April 20	"Pipeline"	The Chantays	4	May 4	5
April 20	"Don't Say Nothin' Bad (About My Baby)"	The Cookies	7	April 27	3
April 27	"On Broadway"	The Drifters	9	April 27	2
April 27	"Watermelon Man"	Mongo Santamaría	10	April 27	2
May 4	"If You Wanna Be Happy"	Jimmy Soul	1	May 18	6
May 4	"Surfin' U.S.A." (#1)	The Beach Boys	3	May 25	6
May 11	"Foolish Little Girl"	The Shirelles	4	May 25	3
May 11	"Losing You"	Brenda Lee	6	May 25	4
May 11	"The Reverend Mr. Black"	The Kingston Trio	8	May 18	2
May 18	"I Love You Because"	Al Martino	3	June 1	6
May 25	"It's My Party"	Lesley Gore	1	June 1	7
May 25	"Two Faces Have I"	Lou Christie	6	June 1	3
May 25	"Take These Chains from My Heart"	Ray Charles	8	May 25	1
May 25	"Another Saturday Night"	Sam Cooke	10	May 25	1
June 1	"Sukiyaki" (#10)	Kyu Sakamoto	1	June 15	8
June 1	"Da Doo Ron Ron"	The Crystals	3	June 8	4
June 1	"You Can't Sit Down"	The Dovells	3	June 15	5
June 8	"Those Lazy-Hazy-Crazy Days of Summer"	Nat "King" Cole	6	June 29	4
June 8	"Still"	Bill Anderson	8	June 8	3
June 15	"Blue on Blue"	Bobby Vinton	3	July 6	5
June 15	"Hello Stranger"	Barbara Lewis	3	June 22	5
June 15	"Eighteen Yellow Roses"	Bobby Darin	10	June 15	1
June 22	"One Fine Day"	The Chiffons	5	July 13	4
June 29	"Easier Said Than Done"	The Essex	1	July 6	7
June 29	"Surf City"	Jan and Dean	1	July 20	7
June 29	"Memphis"	Lonnie Mack	5	July 20	5
July 6	"So Much in Love"	The Tymes	1	August 3	7
July 6	"Tie Me Kangaroo Down, Sport"	Rolf Harris	3	July 13	5
July 13	"Wipe Out"	The Surfaris	2	August 10	7
July 20	"Fingertips - Part 2" (#7)	Little Stevie Wonder	1	August 10	7
July 20	"(You're the) Devil in Disguise"	Elvis Presley	3	August 10	6
July 20	"Pride and Joy"	Marvin Gaye	10	July 20	1
July 27	"Blowin' in the Wind"	Peter, Paul and Mary	2	August 17	7
July 27	"Just One Look"	Doris Troy	10	July 27	2
August 3	"Judy's Turn to Cry"	Lesley Gore	5	August 17	5
August 10	"Candy Girl"	The Four Seasons	3	August 24	5
August 10	"More"	Kai Winding	8	August 24	4
August 17	"My Boyfriend's Back" (#9)	The Angels	1	August 31	9
August 17	"Hello Muddah, Hello Fadduh (A Letter from Camp)"	Allan Sherman	2	August 24	6
August 24	"Denise"	Randy & the Rainbows	10	August 24	2
August 31	"If I Had a Hammer"	Trini Lopez	3	September 7	5
August 31	"Mockingbird"	Inez and Charlie Foxx	7	September 7	3
September 7	"Blue Velvet" (#5)	Bobby Vinton	1	September 21	8
September 7	"Heat Wave"	Martha and the Vandellas	4	September 21	6
September 7	"The Monkey Time"	Major Lance	8	September 7	2
September 7	"Hey Girl"	Freddie Scott	10	September 7	1
September 14	"Sally Go 'Round the Roses"	The Jaynetts	2	September 28	6
September 14	"Then He Kissed Me"	The Crystals	6	September 14	4
September 14	"Surfer Girl"	The Beach Boys	7	September 14	2
September 21	"Cry Baby"	Garnet Mimms	4	October 12	6
September 21	"Mickey's Monkey"	The Miracles	8	September 21	2
September 28	"Be My Baby"	The Ronettes	2	October 12	6
September 28	"Wonderful! Wonderful!"	The Tymes	7	September 28	2
October 5	"Sugar Shack"	Jimmy Gilmer and the Fireballs	1	October 12	10
October 5	"Busted"	Ray Charles	4	October 19	6
October 12	"Mean Woman Blues"	Roy Orbison	5	November 2	5
October 12	"Donna the Prima Donna"	Dion	6	October 26	4
October 19	"Deep Purple"	Nino Tempo & April Stevens	1	November 16	7
October 19	"Don't Think Twice, It's All Right"	Peter, Paul and Mary	9	October 26	2
October 26	"Washington Square"	The Village Stompers	2	November 23	7
November 2	"It's All Right"	The Impressions	4	November 9	5
November 2	"Maria Elena"	Los Indios Tabajaras	6	November 16	4
November 2	"I Can't Stay Mad at You"	Skeeter Davis	7	November 2	2
November 9	"I'm Leaving It Up to You"	Dale and Grace	1	November 23	7
November 9	"Bossa Nova Baby"	Elvis Presley	8	November 16	4
November 16	"Everybody"	Tommy Roe	3	December 7	6
November 16	"She's a Fool"	Lesley Gore	5	December 7	4
November 16	"500 Miles Away From Home"	Bobby Bare	10	November 16	1
November 23	"Dominique"	The Singing Nun	1	December 7	9
November 30	"(Down at) Papa Joe's"	The Dixiebelles	9	November 30	1
December 7	"Louie Louie"	The Kingsmen	2	December 14	9
December 7	"You Don't Have to Be a Baby to Cry"	The Caravelles	3	December 21	4
December 7	"Be True to Your School"	The Beach Boys	6	December 21	4
December 7	"Walking the Dog"	Rufus Thomas	10	December 7	2
December 14	"Since I Fell for You"	Lenny Welch	4	December 28	5
December 14	"Drip Drop"	Dion	6	December 28	3

=== 1962 peaks ===
List of Billboard Hot 100 top ten singles in 1963 which peaked in 1962
Top ten entry date	Single	Artist(s)	Peak	Peak date	Weeks in top ten
November 3	"Big Girls Don't Cry"	The Four Seasons	1	November 17	10
November 3	"Limbo Rock"	Chubby Checker	2	December 22	12
November 3	"Return to Sender"	Elvis Presley	2	November 17	10
November 17	"Bobby's Girl"	Marcie Blane	3	December 1	8
December 8	"Telstar"	The Tornados	1	December 22	8

=== 1964 peaks ===
List of Billboard Hot 100 top ten singles in 1963 which peaked in 1964
Top ten entry date	Single	Artist(s)	Peak	Peak date	Weeks in top ten
December 14	"There! I've Said It Again"	Bobby Vinton	1	January 4	9
December 21	"Popsicles and Icicles"	The Murmaids	3	January 11	6
December 28	"Forget Him"	Bobby Rydell	4	January 18	5
December 28	"Talk Back Trembling Lips"	Johnny Tillotson	7	January 4	3

== See also ==
- 1963 in music
- List of Billboard Hot 100 number-one singles of 1963
- Billboard Year-End Hot 100 singles of 1963
