= List of Billboard Hot 100 number-one singles from 1958 to 1969 =

The Billboard Hot 100 chart is the main song chart of the American music industry and is updated every week by the Billboard magazine. During 1958–1969 the chart was based collectively on each single's weekly physical sales figures and airplay on American radio stations.

== Number ones ==
Key
♪ – Number-one single of the year

Note: The year-end number-one singles for 1963, 1965 and 1966 were "Surfin' U.S.A." by The Beach Boys, "Wooly Bully" by Sam the Sham & the Pharaohs, and "California Dreamin'" by The Mamas and the Papas, respectively, which peaked at numbers 3, 2, and 4, also respectively, and thus are not included here.

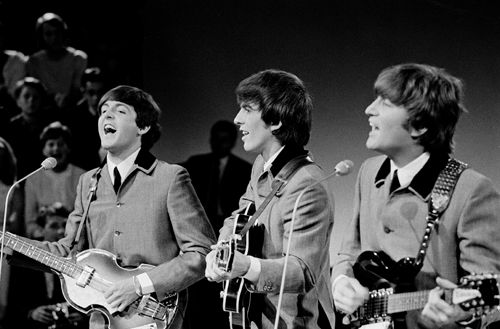
The Beatles earned the most number-one hits (18 songs) and remained the longest at the top of the Billboard Hot 100 chart (55 weeks) during 1958–1969.

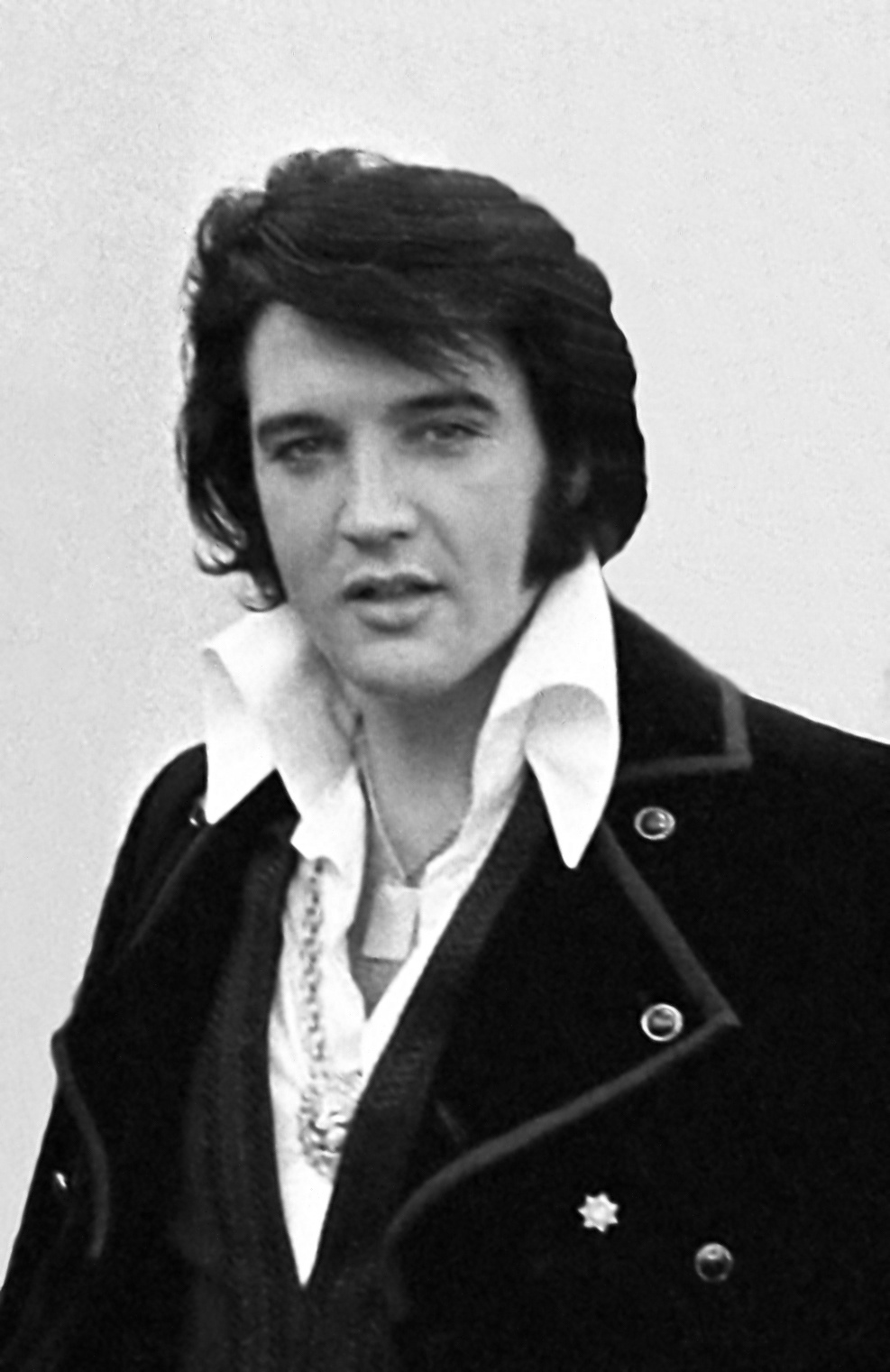
Elvis Presley remained at the top of the Billboard number-one singles chart for 22 weeks during 1958–1969.

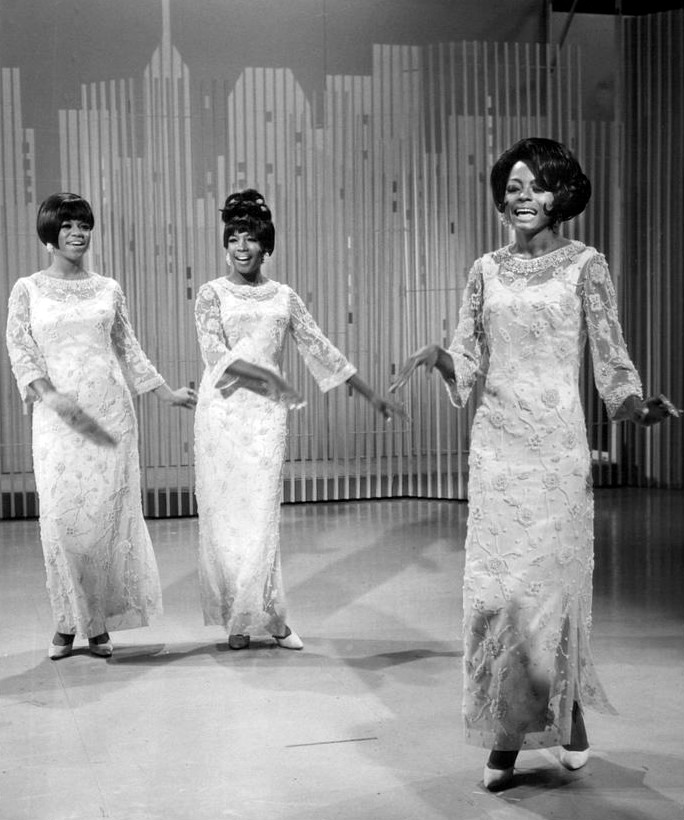
The Supremes scored 12 number-one singles during 1958–1969, spending 22 weeks atop the Billboard Hot 100 chart.

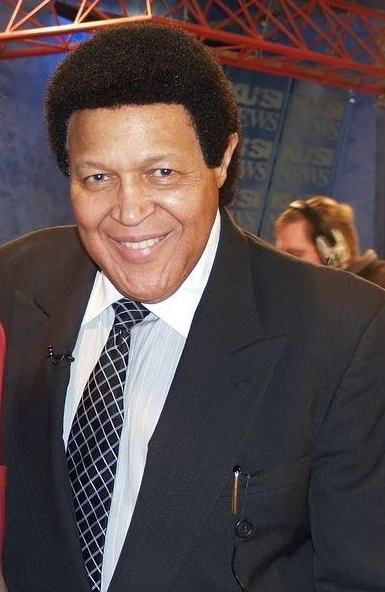
"The Twist" by Chubby Checker topped the chart in two different chart years and ranked as the most successful song in the chart's history, until surpassed by The Weeknd's "Blinding Lights" (2020).

| # | Reached number one | Artist(s) | Single | Record label | Weeks at number one | Ref |
1958
| 1 | August 4, 1958 | Ricky Nelson | "Poor Little Fool" | Imperial | 2 | |
| 2 | August 18, 1958 | Domenico Modugno | "Volare (Nel blu dipinto di blu)"♪ (1958) | Decca | 5 | |
| 3 | August 25, 1958 | The Elegants | "Little Star" | Apt | 1 | |
| 4 | September 29, 1958 | Tommy Edwards | "It's All in the Game" | MGM | 6 | |
| 5 | November 10, 1958 | Conway Twitty | "It's Only Make Believe" | MGM | 2 | |
| 6 | November 17, 1958 | The Kingston Trio | "Tom Dooley" | Capitol | 1 | |
| 7 | December 1, 1958 | The Teddy Bears | "To Know Him Is to Love Him" | Dore | 3 | |
| 8 | December 22, 1958 | The Chipmunks with David Seville | "The Chipmunk Song (Christmas Don't Be Late)" | Liberty | 4 | |
1959
| 9 | January 19, 1959 | The Platters | "Smoke Gets in Your Eyes" | Mercury | 3 | |
| 10 | February 9, 1959 | Lloyd Price | "Stagger Lee" | ABC-Paramount | 4 | |
| 11 | March 9, 1959 | Frankie Avalon | "Venus" | Chancellor | 5 | |
| 12 | April 13, 1959 | The Fleetwoods | "Come Softly to Me" | Dolphin (local), Liberty (nationwide) | 4 | |
| 13 | May 11, 1959 | Dave "Baby" Cortez | "The Happy Organ" | Clock | 1 | |
| 14 | May 18, 1959 | Wilbert Harrison | "Kansas City" | Fury | 2 | |
| 15 | June 1, 1959 | Johnny Horton | "The Battle of New Orleans"♪ (1959) | Columbia | 6 | |
| 16 | July 13, 1959 | Paul Anka | "Lonely Boy" | ABC-Paramount | 4 | |
| 17 | August 10, 1959 | Elvis Presley | "A Big Hunk o' Love" | RCA Victor | 2 | |
| 18 | August 24, 1959 | The Browns | "The Three Bells" | RCA Victor | 4 | |
| 19 | September 21, 1959 | Santo & Johnny | "Sleep Walk" | Canadian-American | 2 | |
| 20 | October 5, 1959 | Bobby Darin | "Mack the Knife" | Atco | 9 | |
| 21 | November 16, 1959 | The Fleetwoods | "Mr. Blue" | Dolton | 1 | |
| 22 | December 14, 1959 | Guy Mitchell | "Heartaches by the Number" | Columbia | 2 | |
| 23 | December 28, 1959 | Frankie Avalon | "Why" | Chancellor | 1 | |
1960
| 24 | January 4, 1960 | Marty Robbins | "El Paso" | Columbia | 2 | |
| 25 | January 18, 1960 | Johnny Preston | "Running Bear" | Mercury | 3 | |
| 26 | February 8, 1960 | Mark Dinning | "Teen Angel" | MGM | 2 | |
| 27 | February 22, 1960 | Percy Faith | "Theme from 'A Summer Place'"♪ (1960) | Columbia | 9 | |
| 28 | April 25, 1960 | Elvis Presley | "Stuck on You" | RCA Victor | 4 | |
| 29 | May 23, 1960 | The Everly Brothers | "Cathy's Clown" | Warner Bros. | 5 | |
| 30 | June 27, 1960 | Connie Francis | "Everybody's Somebody's Fool" | MGM | 2 | |
| 31 | July 11, 1960 | Hollywood Argyles | "Alley-Oop" | Lute | 1 | |
| 32 | July 18, 1960 | Brenda Lee | "I'm Sorry" | Decca | 3 | |
| 33 | August 8, 1960 | Brian Hyland | "Itsy Bitsy Teenie Weenie Yellow Polka Dot Bikini" | Kapp | 1 | |
| 34 | August 15, 1960 | Elvis Presley | "It's Now or Never" | RCA Victor | 5 | |
| 35 | September 19, 1960 | Chubby Checker | "The Twist" | Parkway | 1^{1} | |
| 36 | September 26, 1960 | Connie Francis | "My Heart Has a Mind of Its Own" | MGM | 2 | |
| 37 | October 10, 1960 | Larry Verne | "Mr. Custer" | Era | 1 | |
| 38 | October 17, 1960 | The Drifters | "Save the Last Dance for Me" | Atlantic | 3 | |
| 39 | October 24, 1960 | Brenda Lee | "I Want to Be Wanted" | Decca | 1 | |
| 40 | November 14, 1960 | Ray Charles | "Georgia on My Mind" | ABC-Paramount | 1 | |
| 41 | November 21, 1960 | Maurice Williams and the Zodiacs | "Stay" | Herald | 1 | |
| 42 | November 28, 1960 | Elvis Presley | "Are You Lonesome Tonight?" | RCA Victor | 6 | |
1961
| 43 | January 9, 1961 | Bert Kaempfert | "Wonderland by Night" | Decca | 3 | |
| 44 | January 30, 1961 | The Shirelles | "Will You Love Me Tomorrow" | Scepter | 2 | |
| 45 | February 13, 1961 | Lawrence Welk | "Calcutta" | Dot | 2 | |
| 46 | February 27, 1961 | Chubby Checker | "Pony Time" | Parkway | 3 | |
| 47 | March 20, 1961 | Elvis Presley | "Surrender" | RCA Victor | 2 | |
| 48 | April 3, 1961 | The Marcels | "Blue Moon" | Colpix | 3 | |
| 49 | April 24, 1961 | Del Shannon | "Runaway" | Bigtop | 4 | |
| 50 | May 22, 1961 | Ernie K-Doe | "Mother-in-Law" | Minit | 1 | |
| 51 | May 29, 1961 | Ricky Nelson | "Travelin' Man" | Imperial | 2 | |
| 52 | June 5, 1961 | Roy Orbison | "Running Scared" | Monument | 1 | |
| 53 | June 19, 1961 | Pat Boone | "Moody River" | Dot | 1 | |
| 54 | June 26, 1961 | Gary U.S. Bonds | "Quarter to Three" | Legrand | 2 | |
| 55 | July 10, 1961 | Bobby Lewis | "Tossin' and Turnin'"♪ (1961) | Beltone | 7 | |
| 56 | August 28, 1961 | Joe Dowell | "Wooden Heart (Muss I Denn)" | Smash | 1 | |
| 57 | September 4, 1961 | The Highwaymen | "Michael" | United Artists | 2 | |
| 58 | September 18, 1961 | Bobby Vee | "Take Good Care of My Baby" | Liberty | 3 | |
| 59 | October 9, 1961 | Ray Charles | "Hit the Road Jack" | ABC-Paramount | 2 | |
| 60 | October 23, 1961 | Dion | "Runaround Sue" | Laurie | 2 | |
| 61 | November 6, 1961 | Jimmy Dean | "Big Bad John" | Columbia | 5 | |
| 62 | December 11, 1961 | The Marvelettes | "Please Mr. Postman" | Tamla | 1 | |
| 63 | December 18, 1961 | The Tokens | "The Lion Sleeps Tonight" | RCA Victor | 3 | |
1962
| re | January 13, 1962 | Chubby Checker | "The Twist" | Parkway | 2^{1} | |
| 64 | January 27, 1962 | Joey Dee and the Starliters | "Peppermint Twist" | Roulette | 3 | |
| 65 | February 17, 1962 | Gene Chandler | "Duke of Earl" | Vee-Jay | 3 | |
| 66 | March 10, 1962 | Bruce Channel | "Hey! Baby" | Smash | 3 | |
| 67 | March 31, 1962 | Connie Francis | "Don't Break the Heart That Loves You" | MGM | 1 | |
| 68 | April 7, 1962 | Shelley Fabares | "Johnny Angel" | Colpix | 2 | |
| 69 | April 21, 1962 | Elvis Presley | "Good Luck Charm" | RCA Victor | 2 | |
| 70 | May 5, 1962 | The Shirelles | "Soldier Boy" | Scepter | 3 | |
| 71 | May 26, 1962 | Mr. Acker Bilk | "Stranger on the Shore"♪ (1962) | Atco | 1 | |
| 72 | June 2, 1962 | Ray Charles | "I Can't Stop Loving You" | ABC-Paramount | 5 | |
| 73 | July 7, 1962 | David Rose | "The Stripper" | MGM | 1 | |
| 74 | July 14, 1962 | Bobby Vinton | "Roses Are Red (My Love)" | Epic | 4 | |
| 75 | August 11, 1962 | Neil Sedaka | "Breaking Up Is Hard to Do" | RCA Victor | 2 | |
| 76 | August 25, 1962 | Little Eva | "The Loco-Motion" | Dimension | 1 | |
| 77 | September 1, 1962 | Tommy Roe | "Sheila" | ABC-Paramount | 2 | |
| 78 | September 15, 1962 | The Four Seasons | "Sherry" | Vee-Jay | 5 | |
| 79 | October 20, 1962 | Bobby "Boris" Pickett and the Crypt-Kickers | "Monster Mash" | Garpax | 2 | |
| 80 | November 3, 1962 | The Crystals | "He's a Rebel" | Philles | 2 | |
| 81 | November 17, 1962 | The Four Seasons | "Big Girls Don't Cry" | Vee-Jay | 5 | |
| 82 | December 22, 1962 | The Tornados | "Telstar" | London | 3 | |
1963
| 83 | January 12, 1963 | Steve Lawrence | "Go Away Little Girl" | Columbia | 2 | |
| 84 | January 26, 1963 | The Rooftop Singers | "Walk Right In" | Vanguard | 2 | |
| 85 | February 9, 1963 | Paul & Paula | "Hey Paula" | Philips | 3 | |
| 86 | March 2, 1963 | The Four Seasons | "Walk Like A Man" | Vee-Jay | 3 | |
| 87 | March 23, 1963 | Ruby & the Romantics | "Our Day Will Come" | Kapp | 1 | |
| 88 | March 30, 1963 | The Chiffons | "He's So Fine" | Laurie | 4 | |
| 89 | April 27, 1963 | Little Peggy March | "I Will Follow Him" | RCA Victor | 3 | |
| 90 | May 18, 1963 | Jimmy Soul | "If You Wanna Be Happy" | S.P.Q.R. | 2 | |
| 91 | June 1, 1963 | Lesley Gore | "It's My Party" | Mercury | 2 | |
| 92 | June 15, 1963 | Kyu Sakamoto | "Sukiyaki" | Capitol | 3 | |
| 93 | July 6, 1963 | The Essex | "Easier Said Than Done" | Roulette | 2 | |
| 94 | July 20, 1963 | Jan and Dean | "Surf City" | Liberty | 2 | |
| 95 | August 3, 1963 | The Tymes | "So Much in Love" | Parkway | 1 | |
| 96 | August 10, 1963 | Little Stevie Wonder | "Fingertips" | Tamla | 3 | |
| 97 | August 31, 1963 | The Angels | "My Boyfriend's Back" | Smash | 3 | |
| 98 | September 21, 1963 | Bobby Vinton | "Blue Velvet" | Epic | 3 | |
| 99 | October 12, 1963 | Jimmy Gilmer and the Fireballs | "Sugar Shack"♪ (1963) | Dot | 5 | |
| 100 | November 16, 1963 | Nino Tempo and April Stevens | "Deep Purple" | Atco | 1 | |
| 101 | November 23, 1963 | Dale & Grace | "I'm Leaving It Up to You" | Montel | 2 | |
| 102 | December 7, 1963 | The Singing Nun | "Dominique" | Philips | 4 | |
1964
| 103 | January 4, 1964 | Bobby Vinton | "There! I've Said It Again" | Epic | 4 | |
| 104 | February 1, 1964 | The Beatles | "I Want to Hold Your Hand"♪ (1964) | Capitol | 7 | |
| 105 | March 21, 1964 | The Beatles | "She Loves You" | Swan | 2 | |
| 106 | April 4, 1964 | The Beatles | "Can't Buy Me Love" | Capitol | 5 | |
| 107 | May 9, 1964 | Louis Armstrong | "Hello, Dolly!" | Kapp | 1 | |
| 108 | May 16, 1964 | Mary Wells | "My Guy" | Motown | 2 | |
| 109 | May 30, 1964 | The Beatles | "Love Me Do" | Tollie | 1 | |
| 110 | June 6, 1964 | The Dixie Cups | "Chapel of Love" | Red Bird | 3 | |
| 111 | June 27, 1964 | Peter and Gordon | "A World Without Love" | Capitol | 1 | |
| 112 | July 4, 1964 | The Beach Boys | "I Get Around" | Capitol | 2 | |
| 113 | July 18, 1964 | The Four Seasons | "Rag Doll" | Philips | 2 | |
| 114 | August 1, 1964 | The Beatles | "A Hard Day's Night" | Capitol | 2 | |
| 115 | August 15, 1964 | Dean Martin | "Everybody Loves Somebody" | Reprise | 1 | |
| 116 | August 22, 1964 | The Supremes | "Where Did Our Love Go" | Motown | 2 | |
| 117 | September 5, 1964 | The Animals | "The House of the Rising Sun" | MGM | 3 | |
| 118 | September 26, 1964 | Roy Orbison | "Oh, Pretty Woman" | Monument | 3 | |
| 119 | October 17, 1964 | Manfred Mann | "Do Wah Diddy Diddy" | Ascot | 2 | |
| 120 | October 31, 1964 | The Supremes | "Baby Love" | Motown | 4 | |
| 121 | November 28, 1964 | The Shangri-Las | "Leader of the Pack" | Red Bird | 1 | |
| 122 | December 5, 1964 | Lorne Greene | "Ringo" | RCA Victor | 1 | |
| 123 | December 12, 1964 | Bobby Vinton | "Mr. Lonely" | Epic | 1 | |
| 124 | December 19, 1964 | The Supremes | "Come See About Me" | Motown | 2 | |
| 125 | December 26, 1964 | The Beatles | "I Feel Fine" | Capitol | 3 | |
1965
| 126 | January 23, 1965 | Petula Clark | "Downtown" | Warner Bros. | 2 | |
| 127 | February 6, 1965 | The Righteous Brothers | "You've Lost That Lovin' Feelin'" | Philles | 2 | |
| 128 | February 20, 1965 | Gary Lewis & The Playboys | "This Diamond Ring" | Liberty | 2 | |
| 129 | March 6, 1965 | The Temptations | "My Girl" | Motown | 1 | |
| 130 | March 13, 1965 | The Beatles | "Eight Days a Week" | Capitol | 2 | |
| 131 | March 27, 1965 | The Supremes | "Stop! In the Name of Love" | Motown | 2 | |
| 132 | April 10, 1965 | Freddie and the Dreamers | "I'm Telling You Now" | Tower | 2 | |
| 133 | April 24, 1965 | Wayne Fontana & The Mindbenders | "Game of Love" | Fontana | 1 | |
| 134 | May 1, 1965 | Herman's Hermits | "Mrs. Brown, You've Got a Lovely Daughter" | MGM | 3 | |
| 135 | May 22, 1965 | The Beatles | "Ticket to Ride" | Capitol | 1 | |
| 136 | May 29, 1965 | The Beach Boys | "Help Me Rhonda" | Capitol | 2 | |
| 137 | June 12, 1965 | The Supremes | "Back in My Arms Again" | Motown | 1 | |
| 138 | June 19, 1965 | Four Tops | "I Can't Help Myself (Sugar Pie, Honey Bunch)" | Motown | 2 | |
| 139 | June 26, 1965 | The Byrds | "Mr. Tambourine Man" | Columbia | 1 | |
| 140 | July 10, 1965 | The Rolling Stones | "(I Can't Get No) Satisfaction" | London | 4 | |
| 141 | August 7, 1965 | Herman's Hermits | "I'm Henry VIII, I Am" | MGM | 1 | |
| 142 | August 14, 1965 | Sonny & Cher | "I Got You Babe" | Atco | 3 | |
| 143 | September 4, 1965 | The Beatles | "Help!" | Capitol | 3 | |
| 144 | September 25, 1965 | Barry McGuire | "Eve Of Destruction" | Dunhill | 1 | |
| 145 | October 2, 1965 | The McCoys | "Hang On Sloopy" | Bang | 1 | |
| 146 | October 9, 1965 | The Beatles | "Yesterday" | Capitol | 4 | |
| 147 | November 6, 1965 | The Rolling Stones | "Get Off of My Cloud" | London | 2 | |
| 148 | November 20, 1965 | The Supremes | "I Hear a Symphony" | Motown | 2 | |
| 149 | December 4, 1965 | The Byrds | "Turn! Turn! Turn! (To Everything There Is a Season)" | Columbia | 3 | |
| 150 | December 25, 1965 | The Dave Clark Five | "Over and Over" | Epic | 1 | |
1966
| 151 | January 1, 1966 | Simon & Garfunkel | "The Sound of Silence" | Columbia | 2 | |
| 152 | January 8, 1966 | The Beatles | "We Can Work It Out" | Capitol | 3 | |
| 153 | February 5, 1966 | Petula Clark | "My Love" | Warner Bros. | 2 | |
| 154 | February 19, 1966 | Lou Christie | "Lightnin' Strikes" | MGM | 1 | |
| 155 | February 26, 1966 | Nancy Sinatra | "These Boots Are Made for Walkin'" | Reprise | 1 | |
| 156 | March 5, 1966 | Barry Sadler | "The Ballad of the Green Berets"♪ (1966) | RCA Victor | 5 | |
| 157 | April 9, 1966 | The Righteous Brothers | "(You're My) Soul And Inspiration" | Verve | 3 | |
| 158 | April 30, 1966 | The Young Rascals | "Good Lovin'" | Atlantic | 1 | |
| 159 | May 7, 1966 | The Mamas & the Papas | "Monday, Monday" | Dunhill | 3 | |
| 160 | May 28, 1966 | Percy Sledge | "When A Man Loves A Woman" | Atlantic | 2 | |
| 161 | June 11, 1966 | The Rolling Stones | "Paint It Black" | London | 2 | |
| 162 | June 25, 1966 | The Beatles | "Paperback Writer" | Capitol | 2 | |
| 163 | July 2, 1966 | Frank Sinatra | "Strangers In The Night" | Reprise | 1 | |
| 164 | July 16, 1966 | Tommy James and the Shondells | "Hanky Panky" | Roulette | 2 | |
| 165 | July 30, 1966 | The Troggs | "Wild Thing" | Atco | 2 | |
| 166 | August 13, 1966 | The Lovin' Spoonful | "Summer in the City" | Kama Sutra | 3 | |
| 167 | September 3, 1966 | Donovan | "Sunshine Superman" | Epic | 1 | |
| 168 | September 10, 1966 | The Supremes | "You Can't Hurry Love" | Motown | 2 | |
| 169 | September 24, 1966 | The Association | "Cherish" | Valiant | 3 | |
| 170 | October 15, 1966 | Four Tops | "Reach Out I'll Be There" | Motown | 2 | |
| 171 | October 29, 1966 | ? & the Mysterians | "96 Tears" | Cameo | 1 | |
| 172 | November 5, 1966 | The Monkees | "Last Train to Clarksville" | Colgems | 1 | |
| 173 | November 12, 1966 | Johnny Rivers | "Poor Side Of Town" | Imperial | 1 | |
| 174 | November 19, 1966 | The Supremes | "You Keep Me Hangin' On" | Motown | 2 | |
| 175 | December 3, 1966 | The New Vaudeville Band | "Winchester Cathedral" | Fontana | 3 | |
| 176 | December 10, 1966 | The Beach Boys | "Good Vibrations" | Capitol | 1 | |
| 177 | December 31, 1966 | The Monkees | "I'm a Believer" | Colgems | 7 | |
1967
| 178 | February 18, 1967 | The Buckinghams | "Kind of a Drag" | USA | 2 | |
| 179 | March 4, 1967 | The Rolling Stones | "Ruby Tuesday" | London | 1 | |
| 180 | March 11, 1967 | The Supremes | "Love Is Here and Now You're Gone" | Motown | 1 | |
| 181 | March 18, 1967 | The Beatles | "Penny Lane" | Capitol | 1 | |
| 182 | March 25, 1967 | The Turtles | "Happy Together" | White Whale | 3 | |
| 183 | April 15, 1967 | Nancy Sinatra and Frank Sinatra | "Somethin' Stupid" | Reprise | 4 | |
| 184 | May 13, 1967 | The Supremes | "The Happening" | Motown | 1 | |
| 185 | May 20, 1967 | The Young Rascals | "Groovin'" | Atlantic | 4 | |
| 186 | June 3, 1967 | Aretha Franklin | "Respect" | Atlantic | 2 | |
| 187 | July 1, 1967 | The Association | "Windy" | Warner Bros. | 4 | |
| 188 | July 29, 1967 | The Doors | "Light My Fire" | Elektra | 3 | |
| 189 | August 19, 1967 | The Beatles | "All You Need Is Love" | Capitol | 1 | |
| 190 | August 26, 1967 | Bobbie Gentry | "Ode to Billie Joe" | Capitol | 4 | |
| 191 | September 23, 1967 | Box Tops | "The Letter" | Mala | 4 | |
| 192 | October 21, 1967 | Lulu | "To Sir With Love"♪ (1967) | Epic | 5 | |
| 193 | November 25, 1967 | Strawberry Alarm Clock | "Incense and Peppermints" | Uni | 1 | |
| 194 | December 2, 1967 | The Monkees | "Daydream Believer" | Colgems | 4 | |
| 195 | December 30, 1967 | The Beatles | "Hello, Goodbye" | Capitol | 3 | |
1968
| 196 | January 20, 1968 | John Fred & His Playboy Band | "Judy in Disguise (With Glasses)" | Paula | 2 | |
| 197 | February 3, 1968 | The Lemon Pipers | "Green Tambourine" | Buddah | 1 | |
| 198 | February 10, 1968 | Paul Mauriat | "Love Is Blue" | Philips | 5 | |
| 199 | March 16, 1968 | Otis Redding | "(Sittin' On) The Dock of the Bay" | Volt | 4 | |
| 200 | April 13, 1968 | Bobby Goldsboro | "Honey" | United Artists | 5 | |
| 201 | May 18, 1968 | Archie Bell & the Drells | "Tighten Up" | Atlantic | 2 | |
| 202 | June 1, 1968 | Simon & Garfunkel | "Mrs. Robinson" | Columbia | 3 | |
| 203 | June 22, 1968 | Herb Alpert | "This Guy's in Love with You" | A&M | 4 | |
| 204 | July 20, 1968 | Hugh Masekela | "Grazing in the Grass" | Uni | 2 | |
| 205 | August 3, 1968 | The Doors | "Hello, I Love You" | Elektra | 2 | |
| 206 | August 17, 1968 | The Rascals | "People Got to Be Free" | Atlantic | 5 | |
| 207 | September 21, 1968 | Jeannie C. Riley | "Harper Valley P.T.A." | Plantation | 1 | |
| 208 | September 28, 1968 | The Beatles | "Hey Jude"♪ (1968) | Apple | 9 | |
| 209 | November 30, 1968 | Diana Ross & the Supremes | "Love Child" | Motown | 2 | |
| 210 | December 14, 1968 | Marvin Gaye | "I Heard It Through the Grapevine" | Tamla | 7 | |
1969
| 211 | February 1, 1969 | Tommy James and the Shondells | "Crimson and Clover" | Roulette | 2 | |
| 212 | February 15, 1969 | Sly and the Family Stone | "Everyday People" | Epic | 4 | |
| 213 | March 15, 1969 | Tommy Roe | "Dizzy" | ABC | 4 | |
| 214 | April 12, 1969 | The 5th Dimension | "Aquarius/Let the Sunshine In" | Soul City | 6 | |
| 215 | May 24, 1969 | The Beatles with Billy Preston | "Get Back" | Apple | 5 | |
| 216 | June 28, 1969 | Henry Mancini | "Love Theme from Romeo and Juliet" | RCA Victor | 2 | |
| 217 | July 12, 1969 | Zager and Evans | "In the Year 2525" | RCA Victor | 6 | |
| 218 | August 23, 1969 | The Rolling Stones | "Honky Tonk Women" | London | 4 | |
| 219 | September 20, 1969 | The Archies | "Sugar, Sugar"♪ (1969) | Calendar | 4 | |
| 220 | October 18, 1969 | The Temptations | "I Can't Get Next To You" | Gordy | 2 | |
| 221 | November 1, 1969 | Elvis Presley | "Suspicious Minds" | RCA Victor | 1 | |
| 222 | November 8, 1969 | The 5th Dimension | "Wedding Bell Blues" | Soul City | 3 | |
| 223 | November 29, 1969 | The Beatles | "Come Together"/"Something" | Apple | 1 | |
| 224 | December 6, 1969 | Steam | "Na Na Hey Hey Kiss Him Goodbye" | Fontana | 2 | |
| 225 | December 20, 1969 | Peter, Paul & Mary | "Leaving on a Jet Plane" | Warner Bros. | 1 | |
| 226 | December 27, 1969 | Diana Ross & the Supremes | "Someday We'll Be Together" | Motown | 1 | |

Notes
^{1} Across two separate chart runs (1960, 1962), "The Twist" has accumulated three total weeks at number-one. It was the only song in the history of the Hot 100 to achieve number-one in two separate chart runs, until "All I Want for Christmas Is You" by Mariah Carey accomplished the same feat in 2020.

== Statistics by decade ==
=== By artist ===
The following artists achieved four or more number-one hits during 1958–1969. A number of artists had number-one singles on their own as well as part of a collaboration.

| Artist | Number-one hits |
|---|---|
| The Beatles | 18 |
| The Supremes | 12 |
| Elvis Presley | 7 |
| The Rolling Stones | 5 |
| Bobby Vinton | 4 |
| The Four Seasons | 4 |

=== Artists by total number of weeks at number-one ===
The following artists were featured in top of the chart for the highest total number of weeks during 1958–1969.

| Artist | Weeks at number-one |
|---|---|
| The Beatles | 55 |
| The Supremes | 22 |
| Elvis Presley | 22 |
| The Four Seasons | 15 |
| The Rolling Stones | 13 |
| Bobby Vinton | 12 |
| The Monkees | 12 |
| The (Young) Rascals | 10 |

=== Songs by total number of weeks at number-one ===
The following songs were featured in top of the chart for the highest total number of weeks during 1958–1969.

| Weeks at number one | Song | Artist(s) |
|---|---|---|
| 9 | "Mack the Knife" | Bobby Darin |
| 9 | "Theme from A Summer Place" | Percy Faith |
| 9 | "Hey Jude" | The Beatles |
| 7 | "Tossin' and Turnin'" | Bobby Lewis |
| 7 | "I Want to Hold Your Hand" | The Beatles |
| 7 | "I'm a Believer" | The Monkees |
| 7 | "I Heard It Through the Grapevine" | Marvin Gaye |
| 6 | "It's All in the Game" | Tommy Edwards |
| 6 | "The Battle of New Orleans" | Johnny Horton |
| 6 | "Are You Lonesome Tonight?" | Elvis Presley |
| 6 | "Aquarius/Let the Sunshine In" | The 5th Dimension |
| 6 | "In the Year 2525" | Zager and Evans |

== See also ==
- List of UK Singles Chart number ones of the 1960s
- List of Billboard number-one singles
- 1960s in music
