= List of Cash Box Top 100 number-one singles of 1963 =

These are the songs that reached number one on the Top 100 Best Sellers chart in 1963 as published by Cash Box magazine.

Issue date	Song	Artist
January 5	Telstar	The Tornadoes
January 12	Telstar	The Tornadoes
January 19	Go Away Little Girl	Steve Lawrence
January 26	Go Away Little Girl	Steve Lawrence
February 2	Walk Right In	Rooftop Singers
February 9	Hey Paula	Paul & Paula
February 16	Hey Paula	Paul & Paula
February 23	Hey Paula	Paul & Paula
March 2	Hey Paula	Paul & Paula
March 9	Walk Like A Man	The Four Seasons
March 16	Walk Like A Man	The Four Seasons
March 23	Our Day Will Come	Ruby & The Romantics
March 30	He's So Fine	The Chiffons
April 6	He's So Fine	The Chiffons
April 13	He's So Fine	The Chiffons
April 20	He's So Fine	The Chiffons
April 27	Can't Get Used to Losing You	Andy Williams
May 4	I Will Follow Him	Little Peggy March
May 11	I Will Follow Him	Little Peggy March
May 18	I Will Follow Him	Little Peggy March
May 25	If You Wanna Be Happy	Jimmy Soul
June 1	It's My Party	Lesley Gore
June 8	It's My Party	Lesley Gore
June 15	Sukiyaki	Kyu Sakamoto
June 22	Sukiyaki	Kyu Sakamoto
June 29	Sukiyaki	Kyu Sakamoto
July 6	Sukiyaki	Kyu Sakamoto
July 13	Easier Said Than Done	The Essex
July 20	Easier Said Than Done	The Essex
July 27	Surf City	Jan and Dean
August 3	Fingertips (pt. 2)	Little Stevie Wonder
August 10	Fingertips (pt. 2)	Little Stevie Wonder
August 17	Fingertips (pt. 2)	Little Stevie Wonder
August 24	Fingertips (pt. 2)	Little Stevie Wonder
August 31	Hello Muddah, Hello Faddah! (A Letter From Camp)	Allan Sherman
September 7	My Boyfriend's Back	The Angels
September 14	My Boyfriend's Back	The Angels
September 21	Blue Velvet	Bobby Vinton
September 28	Blue Velvet	Bobby Vinton
October 5	Blue Velvet	Bobby Vinton
October 12	Be My Baby	The Ronettes
October 19	Sugar Shack	Jimmy Gilmer & The Fireballs
October 26	Sugar Shack	Jimmy Gilmer & The Fireballs
November 2	Sugar Shack	Jimmy Gilmer & The Fireballs
November 9	Deep Purple	Nino Tempo & April Stevens
November 16	Deep Purple	Nino Tempo & April Stevens
November 23	I'm Leaving It Up To You	Dale & Grace
November 30	Dominique	The Singing Nun
December 7	Dominique	The Singing Nun
December 14	Dominique	The Singing Nun
December 21	Dominique	The Singing Nun
December 28	Dominique	The Singing Nun

== See also ==
- 1963 in music
- List of Hot 100 number-one singles of 1963 (U.S.)
