= List of Hot R&B Singles number ones of 1963 =

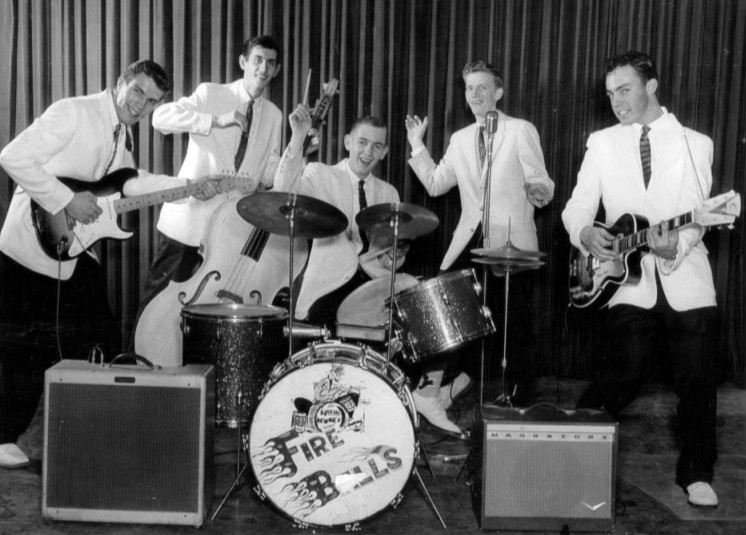
Jimmy Gilmer and the Fireballs had the last number one before the chart was discontinued.

In 1963, Billboard published the Hot R&B Singles chart ranking the top-performing songs in the United States in rhythm and blues (R&B) and related African American-oriented music genres; the chart has undergone various name changes over the decades to reflect the evolution of such genres and since 2005 has been published as Hot R&B/Hip-Hop Songs. During 1963, 21 different singles topped the chart through the issue dated November 23, based on playlists submitted by radio stations and surveys of retail sales outlets. After that issue, Billboard discontinued the chart, which did not return until the issue dated January 30, 1965. No official explanation has ever been given as to why Billboard ceased producing R&B charts. Chart historian Joel Whitburn has contended that "there was so much crossover of titles between the R&B and pop singles (Hot 100) charts that Billboard considered the charts to be too similar".

In the issue of Billboard dated January 5, Esther Phillips moved up to number one with her version of "Release Me", displacing the final chart-topper of 1962, "You Are My Sunshine" by Ray Charles, but Charles's version of the country song returned to the top of the chart the following week. The year's longest-running number one was "Fingertips (Part 2)" by Little Stevie Wonder, which spent six consecutive weeks in the top spot in August and September. Wonder, who would go on to become one of the biggest stars not only in R&B but across all genres, was only 12 years old when the live performance was recorded earlier in the year.

The final number one before Billboard stopped publishing the Hot R&B Singles chart was "Sugar Shack" by Jimmy Gilmer and the Fireballs, which moved into the top spot in the final chart to be published, in the issue dated November 23. The song had previously spent five weeks at number one on the Hot 100. Songs by Wonder, Paul & Paula, Ruby & the Romantics, the Chiffons, Little Peggy March, Jimmy Soul, Lesley Gore, and the Essex also topped both charts in 1963. The majority of the acts who topped the R&B chart in 1963 did so for the first time: Paul & Paula, Ruby & the Romantics, the Chiffons, March, Soul, Gore, Barbara Lewis, the Essex, Wonder, Martha and the Vandellas, Garnet Mimms & the Enchanters, Little Johnny Taylor, the Impressions, and Gilmer and the Fireballs all made their first appearance in the peak position during the year. Although it only spent one week at number one, Taylor's "Part Time Love" was ranked number one on Billboard's year-end R&B chart for 1963.

== Chart history ==
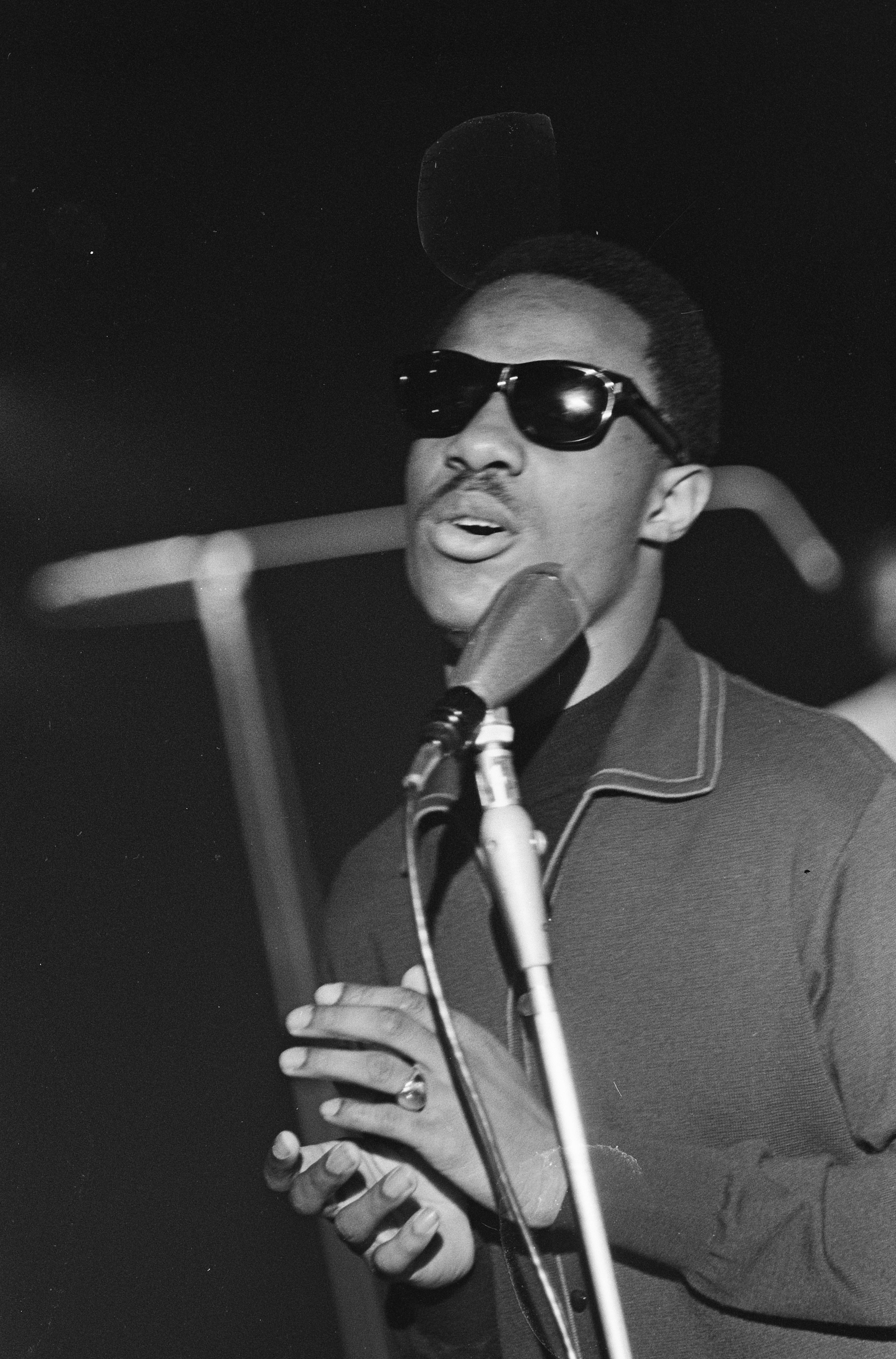
Stevie Wonder had the year's longest-running number one with "Fingertips (Part 2)", recorded live when he was 12 years old.

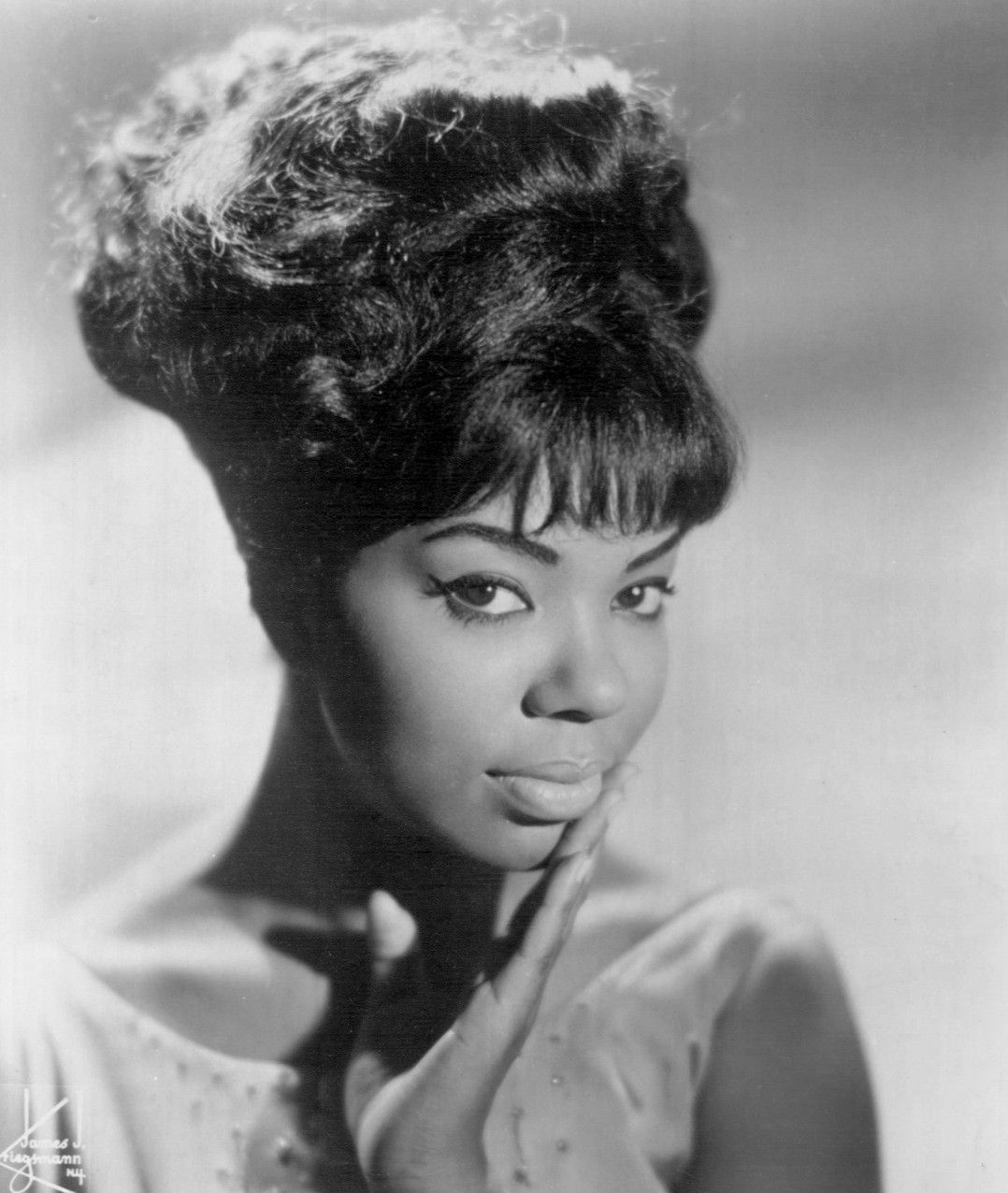
Mary Wells spent four weeks at number one with "Two Lovers".

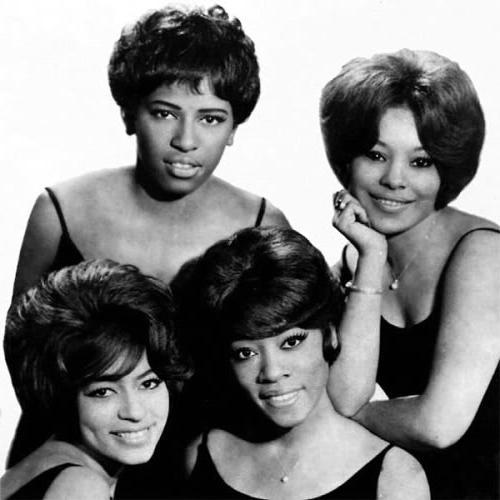
"He's So Fine" was a chart-topper for the Chiffons.

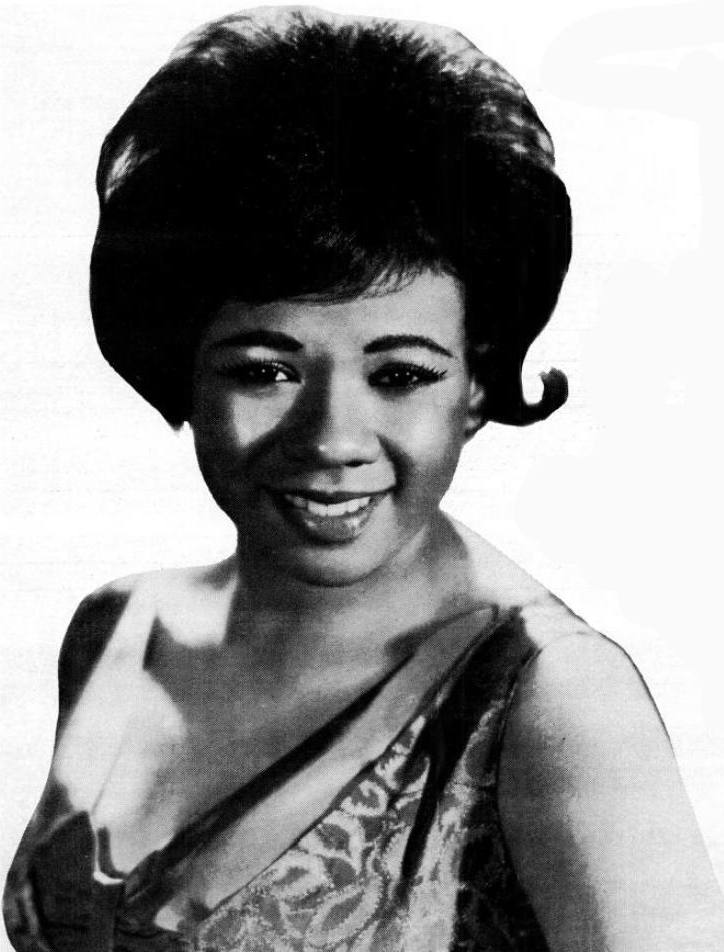
Barbara Lewis gained her only number one in 1963 with "Hello Stranger".

Key
†	Indicates number one on Billboard's year-end R&B chart for 1963

Chart history
Issue date	Title	Artist(s)	Ref.
January 5	"Release Me"	Esther Phillips ("Little Esther")	
January 12	"You Are My Sunshine"	Ray Charles	
January 19	"Two Lovers"	Mary Wells	
January 26	"Two Lovers"	Mary Wells	
February 2	"Two Lovers"	Mary Wells	
February 9	"Two Lovers"	Mary Wells	
February 16	"You've Really Got a Hold on Me"	The Miracles	
February 23	"Hey Paula"	Paul & Paula	
March 2	"Hey Paula"	Paul & Paula	
March 9	"That's the Way Love Is"	Bobby Bland	
March 16	"That's the Way Love Is"	Bobby Bland	
March 23	"Our Day Will Come"	Ruby & the Romantics	
March 30	"Our Day Will Come"	Ruby & the Romantics	
April 6	"He's So Fine"	The Chiffons	
April 13	"He's So Fine"	The Chiffons	
April 20	"He's So Fine"	The Chiffons	
April 27	"He's So Fine"	The Chiffons	
May 4	"Baby Workout"	Jackie Wilson	
May 11	"Baby Workout"	Jackie Wilson	
May 18	"Baby Workout"	Jackie Wilson	
May 25	"I Will Follow Him"	Little Peggy March	
June 1	"If You Wanna Be Happy"	Jimmy Soul	
June 8	"Another Saturday Night"	Sam Cooke	
June 15	"It's My Party"	Lesley Gore	
June 22	"It's My Party"	Lesley Gore	
June 29	"It's My Party"	Lesley Gore	
July 6	"Hello Stranger"	Barbara Lewis	
July 13	"Hello Stranger"	Barbara Lewis	
July 20	"Easier Said Than Done"	The Essex	
July 27	"Easier Said Than Done"	The Essex	
August 3	"Fingertips (Part 2)"	Little Stevie Wonder	
August 10	"Fingertips (Part 2)"	Little Stevie Wonder	
August 17	"Fingertips (Part 2)"	Little Stevie Wonder	
August 24	"Fingertips (Part 2)"	Little Stevie Wonder	
August 31	"Fingertips (Part 2)"	Little Stevie Wonder	
September 7	"Fingertips (Part 2)"	Little Stevie Wonder	
September 14	"Heat Wave"	Martha and the Vandellas	
September 21	"Heat Wave"	Martha and the Vandellas	
September 28	"Heat Wave"	Martha and the Vandellas	
October 5	"Heat Wave"	Martha and the Vandellas	
October 12	"Cry Baby"	Garnet Mimms & the Enchanters	
October 19	"Part Time Love" †	Little Johnny Taylor	
October 26	"Cry Baby"	Garnet Mimms & the Enchanters	
November 2	"Cry Baby"	Garnet Mimms & the Enchanters	
November 9	"It's All Right"	The Impressions	
November 16	"It's All Right"	The Impressions	
November 23	"Sugar Shack"	Jimmy Gilmer and the Fireballs	
