= List of Billboard Hot 100 number ones of 1963 =

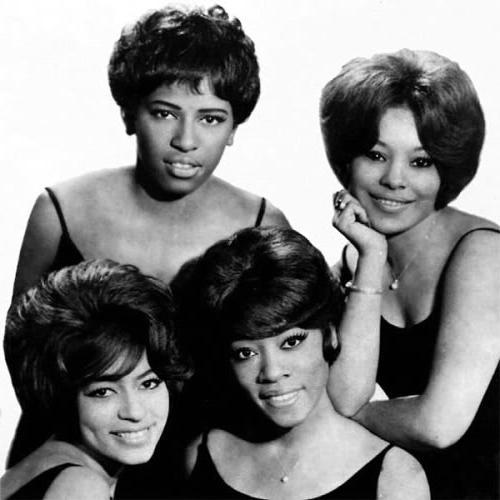
"He's So Fine" was the only Hot 100 number one for the Chiffons.

The Billboard Hot 100 is a chart published since August 1958 by Billboard magazine which ranks the best-performing singles in the United States. In 1963, it was compiled based on a combination of sales and airplay data sourced from surveys of retail outlets and playlists submitted by radio stations respectively, and 21 different singles spent time at number one.

In the issue of Billboard dated January 5, the Tornados were at number one with "Telstar", retaining the top spot from the final chart of 1962. Of the 20 subsequent singles to occupy the peak position during 1963, 18 were by acts which had never previously reached number one, either on the Hot 100 or on the separate sales and airplay charts which Billboard had published prior to launching the consolidated listing. Only the Four Seasons, who reached number one in March with "Walk Like a Man", and Bobby Vinton, who topped the Hot 100 with "Blue Velvet" in September, had achieved a previous chart-topper. Some of the year's chart-topping acts experienced very short runs of success. Jimmy Soul, who spent two weeks atop the Hot 100 with "If You Wanna Be Happy", his second single to enter the chart, not only never reached number one again, but in fact never achieved any subsequent entries at all. "Dominique", which spent the final four weeks of the year at number one, was the only Hot 100 entry which the Singing Nun ever achieved. In June, the Japanese singer Kyu Sakamoto reached number one with "Sukiyaki"; it was the first, and until 2020, the only song by an artist from Asia to top the chart. Originally released in Japan as "Ue o Muite Arukō", it was covered in 1962 by the British jazz band leader Kenny Ball and retitled after an item of Japanese food as it was felt that the original title would be too unusual for Western audiences. Sakamoto's original version was then released in the United States under the same title; as of the 21st century, it remains the only Japanese-language song to top the Hot 100.

Of the 18 acts to reach number one for the first time in 1963, only Little Stevie Wonder would go on to top the Hot 100 again. The singer and multi-instrumentalist, who was only 13 years old when "Fingertips (Part II)" spent three weeks in the peak position in 1963, reached number one a further nine times between 1973 and 1986 after dropping "Little" from his stage name. "Sugar Shack" by Jimmy Gilmer and the Fireballs was the year's longest-running chart-topper, spending five weeks at number one. As no act had more than one number one during the year, the group also had the highest total number of weeks in the top spot during 1963. "Sugar Shack" was also the final number one on Billboard's Hot R&B Singles chart before that listing was discontinued; it eventually returned to the magazine a little over a year later. No official explanation has ever been given as to why Billboard ceased producing R&B charts. Chart historian Joel Whitburn contended that "there was so much crossover of titles between the R&B and pop singles (Hot 100) charts that Billboard considered the charts to be too similar". Eight other singles also topped both charts in 1963.

== Chart history ==
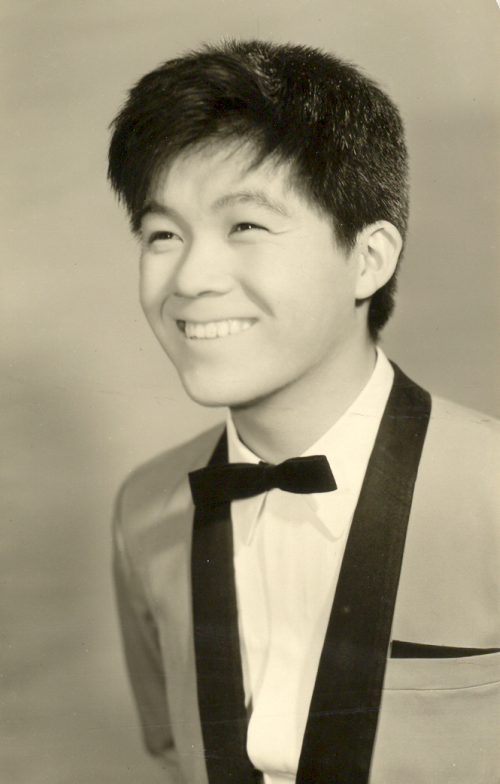
The Japanese singer Kyu Sakamoto reached number one in 1963 with his song "Ue o Muite Arukō", which was released under the title "Sukiyaki" in the U.S.

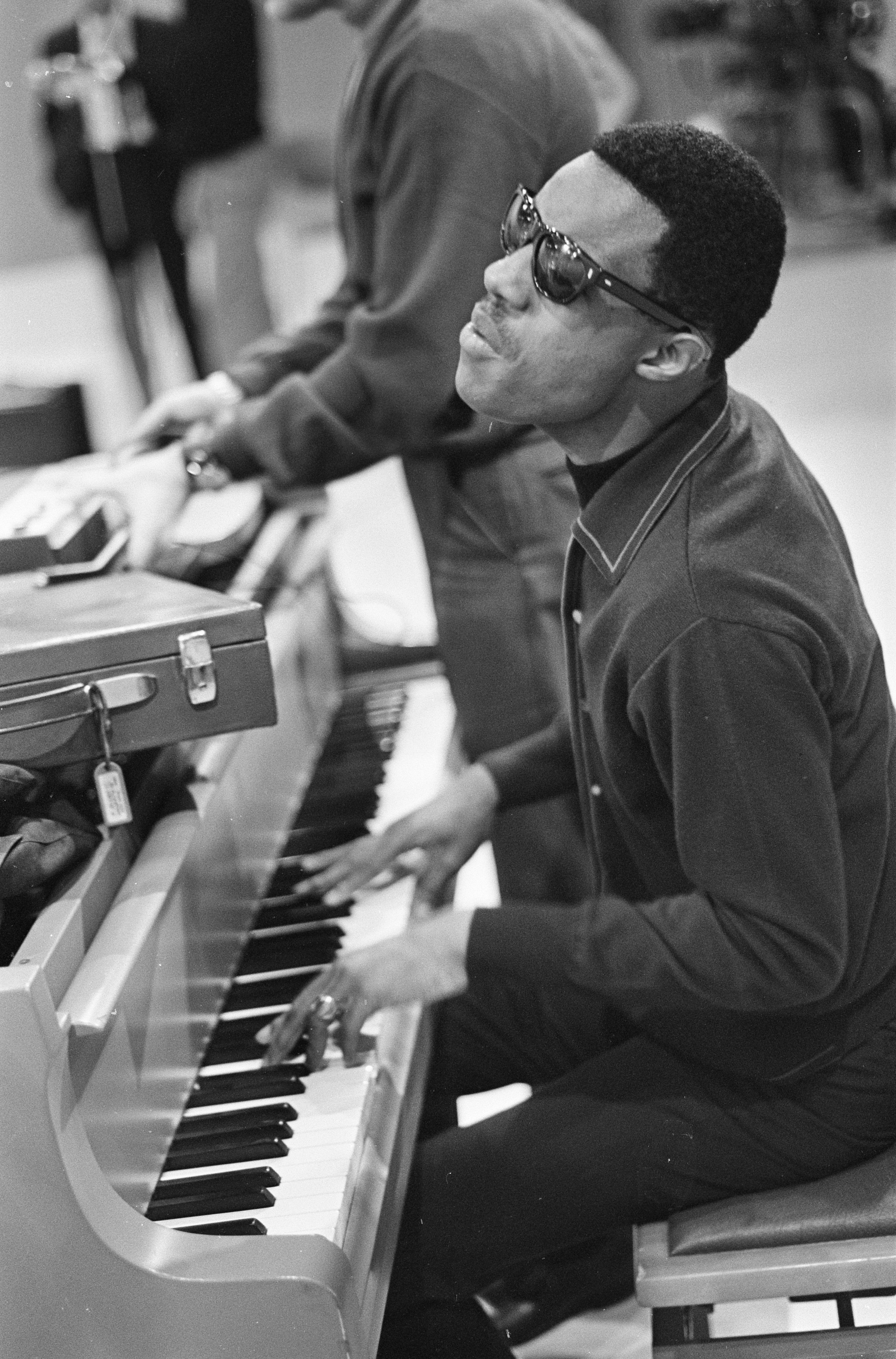
Stevie Wonder, then known as Little Stevie Wonder, had his first number one in 1963 at the age of 13.

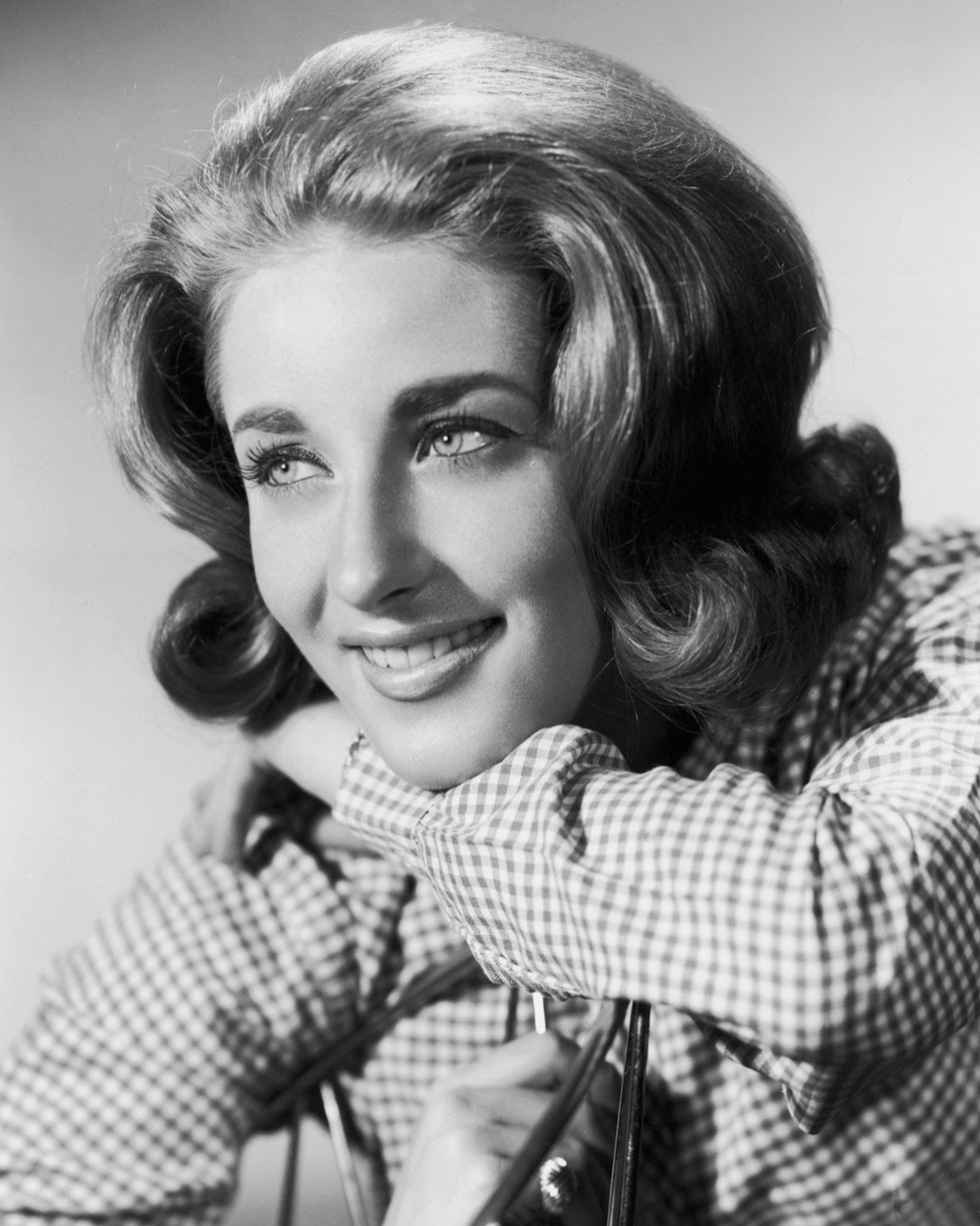
Lesley Gore topped the chart with "It's My Party".

Chart history
No. (Note: The "No." column indicates the numerical sequence of number ones in Hot 100 history.)	Issue date	Title	Artist(s)	Ref.
82	January 5	"Telstar"	The Tornados	
83	January 12	"Go Away Little Girl"	Steve Lawrence	
83	January 19	"Go Away Little Girl"	Steve Lawrence	
84	January 26	"Walk Right In"	The Rooftop Singers	
84	February 2	"Walk Right In"	The Rooftop Singers	
85	February 9	"Hey Paula"	Paul & Paula	
85	February 16	"Hey Paula"	Paul & Paula	
85	February 23	"Hey Paula"	Paul & Paula	
86	March 2	"Walk Like a Man"	The Four Seasons	
86	March 9	"Walk Like a Man"	The Four Seasons	
86	March 16	"Walk Like a Man"	The Four Seasons	
87	March 23	"Our Day Will Come"	Ruby & the Romantics	
88	March 30	"He's So Fine"	The Chiffons	
88	April 6	"He's So Fine"	The Chiffons	
88	April 13	"He's So Fine"	The Chiffons	
88	April 20	"He's So Fine"	The Chiffons	
89	April 27	"I Will Follow Him"	Little Peggy March	
89	May 4	"I Will Follow Him"	Little Peggy March	
89	May 11	"I Will Follow Him"	Little Peggy March	
90	May 18	"If You Wanna Be Happy"	Jimmy Soul	
90	May 25	"If You Wanna Be Happy"	Jimmy Soul	
91	June 1	"It's My Party"	Lesley Gore	
91	June 8	"It's My Party"	Lesley Gore	
92	June 15	"Sukiyaki"	Kyu Sakamoto	
92	June 22	"Sukiyaki"	Kyu Sakamoto	
92	June 29	"Sukiyaki"	Kyu Sakamoto	
93	July 6	"Easier Said Than Done"	The Essex	
93	July 13	"Easier Said Than Done"	The Essex	
94	July 20	"Surf City"	Jan and Dean	
94	July 27	"Surf City"	Jan and Dean	
95	August 3	"So Much in Love"	The Tymes	
96	August 10	"Fingertips (Part II)"	Little Stevie Wonder	
96	August 17	"Fingertips (Part II)"	Little Stevie Wonder	
96	August 24	"Fingertips (Part II)"	Little Stevie Wonder	
97	August 31	"My Boyfriend's Back"	The Angels	
97	September 7	"My Boyfriend's Back"	The Angels	
97	September 14	"My Boyfriend's Back"	The Angels	
98	September 21	"Blue Velvet"	Bobby Vinton	
98	September 28	"Blue Velvet"	Bobby Vinton	
98	October 5	"Blue Velvet"	Bobby Vinton	
99	October 12	"Sugar Shack"	Jimmy Gilmer and the Fireballs	
99	October 19	"Sugar Shack"	Jimmy Gilmer and the Fireballs	
99	October 26	"Sugar Shack"	Jimmy Gilmer and the Fireballs	
99	November 2	"Sugar Shack"	Jimmy Gilmer and the Fireballs	
99	November 9	"Sugar Shack"	Jimmy Gilmer and the Fireballs	
100	November 16	"Deep Purple"	Nino Tempo & April Stevens	
101	November 23	"I'm Leaving It Up to You"	Dale & Grace	
101	November 30	"I'm Leaving It Up to You"	Dale & Grace	
102	December 7	"Dominique"	The Singing Nun	
102	December 14	"Dominique"	The Singing Nun	
102	December 21	"Dominique"	The Singing Nun	
102	December 28	"Dominique"	The Singing Nun	

== Number-one artists ==
List of number-one artists by total weeks at number one
Weeks at No. 1	Artist
5	Jimmy Gilmer and the Fireballs
4	The Chiffons
4	The Singing Nun
3	Paul & Paula
3	The Four Seasons
3	Little Peggy March
3	Kyu Sakamoto
3	Little Stevie Wonder
3	The Angels
3	Bobby Vinton
2	Steve Lawrence
2	The Rooftop Singers
2	Jimmy Soul
2	Lesley Gore
2	The Essex
2	Jan and Dean
2	Dale & Grace
1	The Tornados
1	Ruby & the Romantics
1	The Tymes
1	Nino Tempo & April Stevens

== See also ==
- 1963 in music
- List of Billboard number-one singles
- List of Billboard Hot 100 top-ten singles in 1963
- List of Billboard Hot 100 number-one singles from 1958 to 1969
