= Surf City and Other Swingin' Cities =

Studio album by Jan and Dean
- Released: July 22, 1963
- Genre: Surf rock
- Length: 30:28
- Label: Liberty
- Producer: Jan Berry

Jan and Dean chronology
Jan & Dean Take Linda Surfin' (1963)	Surf City and Other Swingin' Cities (1963)	Drag City (1963)

Singles from Surf City and Other Swingin' Cities
- 1. "Surf City" Released: May 17, 1963; 2. "Honolulu Lulu" Released: August 9, 1963

Professional ratings
Review scores
Source	Rating
The Encyclopedia of Popular Music	3/5 stars
The Rolling Stone Album Guide	3/5 stars

Surf City and Other Swingin' Cities is the second studio album by the American surf rock and pop duo Jan and Dean. It was released on July 22, 1963 by Liberty Records.

== Background ==
"Surf City" was released as a single on May 17, 1963, with "She's My Summer Girl" as the B-side. "She's My Summer Girl" later appeared on Jan and Dean's 1964 album Ride the Wild Surf. On July 20, the single topped the Billboard Hot 100 and peaked at number 3 on Billboard's Hot R&B Singles chart.

On June 12, 1963, "Detroit City" and "I Left My Heart in San Francisco" were tracked at Radio Recorders. On June 13, two tracking sessions were held at Western Recorders. "Soul City" and "Kansas City" were tracked during the first session, while "Memphis, Tennessee", "Tallahassee Lassie", and "Honolulu Lulu" were tracked during the second. On June 19, "Manhattan", "Way Down Yonder in New Orleans", and "You Came a Long Way from St. Louis" were tracked at Western. On June 23, "Philadelphia, PA" was tracked at Radio Recorders. Strings were overdubbed at an unknown date.

== Release and reception ==
Liberty released Surf City and Other Swingin' Cities in mono and stereo on July 22, 1963. The album reached number 32 on the Billboard Top LPs chart. "Honolulu Lulu" was released as a single on August 9 with "Someday (You'll Go Walking By)" as the B-side. The single reached number 11 on the Billboard Hot 100.

Writing for AllMusic, Bruce Eder called Surf City and Other Swingin' Cities a "musical travelogue of the United States that didn't seem too inspired as a concept even in 1963", noting that "there is something to recommend almost all of it". Cashbox wrote in their review that "The musical bill-of-fare here includes a melodic amalgam of evergreens and newies", noting that "The arrangements are first-rate and the boys handle them with ease." The writers of Billboard gave it a positive review.

== Track listing ==
Side one
No.	Title	Writer(s)	Length
1.	"Surf City"	Brian Wilson and Jan Berry	2:24
2.	"Memphis, Tennessee"	Chuck Berry	2:33
3.	"Detroit City"	Danny Dill and Mel Tillis	2:56
4.	"Manhattan"	Lorenz Hart (lyrics) and Richard Rodgers (music)	2:20
5.	"Philadelphia, PA"	Don Altfeld, Bones Howe, Lou Adler, Dean Torrence and Jan Berry	2:15
6.	"Way Down Yonder in New Orleans"	Joe Turner Layton and Henry Creamer	2:45

Side two

No.	Title	Writer(s)	Length
1.	"Honolulu Lulu"	Jan Berry	2:17
2.	"Kansas City"	Jerry Leiber and Mike Stoller	2:33
3.	"I Left My Heart in San Francisco"	George Cory (music) and Douglass Cross (lyrics)	2:34
4.	"You Came a Long Way from St. Louis"	John Benson Brooks (music) and Bob Russell (lyrics)	2:18
5.	"Tallahassee Lassie"	Bob Crewe, Frank Slay and Frederick Picariello	2:10
6.	"Soul City"	Bob Finiz and Joe Wissert	3:05
Total length:			30:28

== Personnel ==
Per Mark A. Moore.

- Jan Berry – harmony vocals
- Dean Torrence – harmony vocals

The Matadors

- Tony Minichiello – harmony vocals
- Vic Diaz – harmony vocals
- Manuel Sanchez – harmony vocals

Other musicians

- Hal Blaine – drums
- Earl Palmer – drums
- Glen Campbell – guitars
- Bill Pitman – guitars
- Billy Strange – guitars
- Tommy Tedesco – guitars
- Ray Pohlman – basses
- Jimmy Bond – basses
- Leon Russell – piano
- Jay Migliori – horns
- Steve Douglas – horns
- Roy Caton – horns
- Tom Scott – horns
- Sid Sharp – string section
- Don Altfeld – hand clappers
- Bones Howe – hand clappers
- Don Wood – hand clappers
- Richard Lieber – hand clappers

Production

- Jan Berry – arranger, producer
- Don Kirshner – supervision
- Lou Adler – album coordination
- Bones Howe – engineer
- Lanky Linstrot – engineer
- Dave Wiechman – engineer
- Studio Five – cover design and photography
- Bill Ballance – liner notes

== Charts ==
Chart performance for Surf City and Other Swingin' Classics
Chart (1963)	Peak position
US Billboard Top LPs	32
US Cashbox Top 100 Albums	21
