= Tom Shannon (broadcaster) =

American broadcaster (1938–2021)

Thomas Shannon (August 11, 1938 – May 26, 2021) was an American broadcaster from Buffalo, New York.

Shannon was born in Buffalo, New York, and graduated from Bishop Timon – St. Jude High School in 1956 and Buffalo State College in 1960. He held several radio positions, beginning his career as a newsman at WXRA and ending as an oldies jockey at WHTT in the same city. Shannon most notably served as a top-40 disk jockey at WKBW in Buffalo and CKLW in Windsor, Ontario during their peaks as internationally popular radio stations. He served two stints at each station. He also worked at WGR and WKBW-TV in Buffalo, KHOW, KLZ, and KWGN-TV in Denver, and WMJC and WXYZ-TV in Detroit, Michigan. Shannon, along with Phil Todaro, wrote the hit song "Wild Weekend" as his personal theme song, which later became an instrumental hit by The Rockin' Rebels.

Shannon died in hospice care of pancreatic cancer in Salinas, California, on May 26, 2021, at the age of 82.
