= Teddy and the Twilights =

- Also known as: The Deckers, The Buddies
- Origin: Philadelphia
- Genres: R&B
- Years active: 1950s–1963
- Labels: NAR, Yeadon, Swan
- Past members: Curtis Barnes; Fred "Weasel" Cohen; Sam Conners; Ben Hart; John Williams; Larry Williams

Teddy and the Twilights were a R&B quintet from Philadelphia, United States.

== History ==
The group began in the early 1950s in Philadelphia. By 1953 it had acquired the name "The Deckers". They made their first recordings in 1957 for NAR Records. Within the span of just over a year, they made further recordings for Yeadon Records (a label formed for the group), and then signed to Swan Records as "The Buddies." A change in lead singer was arranged by the group's attorney, and they acquired Fred "Weasel" Cohen from The Mohawks. The group changed their name to "Teddy & The Twilights"

With Cohen as the lead singer, the group had one charting song entitled "Woman Is A Man's Best Friend" written by Claridge. The single, Swan catalog #4102, reached #59 on the Billboard charts in 1962.

The group disbanded in 1963.

== Members ==
- Fred "Weasel" Cohen (lead)
- Ben Hart (bass)
- John Williams (1st Tenor)
- Larry Williams (2nd Tenor)
