= Honolulu Lulu =

Single by Jan and Dean

from the album Surf City and Other Swingin' Cities
- B-side: "Someday (You'll Go Walking By)"
- Released: August 9, 1963
- Recorded: 1963
- Genre: Pop rock
- Length: 2:14
- Label: Liberty Records
- Songwriters: Jan Berry, Roger Christian, Lou Adler
- Producers: Jan Berry for Screen Gems, Inc.

Jan and Dean singles chronology
"Surf City" (1963)	"Honolulu Lulu" (1963)	"Drag City" (1963)

"Honolulu Lulu" is a song written by Jan Berry, Roger Christian, and Lou Adler for the American rock duo Jan and Dean from the 1963 album Surf City and Other Swingin' Cities.

== Release and reception ==
Liberty Records released "Honolulu Lulu" on July 22, 1963, where it appeared as the first track on side two of Surf City and Other Swingin' Cities. The single was released on August 9 with "Someday (You'll Go Walking By)" as the B-side. The single charted at number 11 on the Billboard Hot 100. A live version of "Honolulu Lulu" appeared on Jan and Dean's 1966 album Filet of Soul: A "Live" One.

The song has been compared to the duo's previous single "Surf City". Billboard gave "Honolulu Lulu" a positive review, and described the song as "a bright and cheery side with a beat that should have the teen set dancing from the Oahu beaches to the New Jersey shore". Cash Box called the single "a thumpin' rock-a-teen delight". In a retrospective review of the song, Richie Unterberger praised how the chorus "makes a pleasing sweep through unpredictable melodic shifts and keys", and also noted, "All parties involved did their level best to dress up the formula with interesting production bits".

== Personnel ==
- Jan Berry: Lead vocals
- Dean Torrence: Backing vocals and harmonies

== Chart performance ==
Chart (1963–64)	Peak position
Australia (Kent Music Report)	18
Canada CHUM Chart	25
US Billboard Hot 100	11
US Cash Box Top 100	10
