= The Dartells =

American rock band

The Dartells were an American early 1960s rock band from Oxnard, California, United States.

The group formed in 1962 while its members were teens, and won local attention under the umbrella of manager/record producer Tom Ayers. They released a single in 1962 entitled "Hot Pastrami", which was a takeoff of Nat Kendrick & the Swans' "Mashed Potatoes". Dot Records picked the song up for national distribution, and it peaked at No. 11 on the US Pop and No. 15 on the Hot R&B Singles chart in 1963. The single was successful, and a Hot Pastrami album was released, which hit No. 95 on the Billboard 200. Subsequent singles fared less well: "Dance Everybody Dance" peaked at No. 99 Pop, and the third single, "Clap Your Hands" (not to be confused with the Beau-Marks record with the same title), failed to chart. The group split up shortly thereafter.

Lead singer Doug Phillips later played in New Concepts and Cottonwood, neither of which enjoyed sustained success. Some of the group's members later joined the short-lived late 1960s group, Rain.

== Members ==
- Doug Phillips - vocals, bass
- Dick Burns - guitar
- Gary Peeler - drums
- Randy Ray - organ
- Rich Piel - saxophone
- Corky Wilkie - saxophone
- Galen Mills - guitar
