= Swan Records =

American record label

Swan Records was a mid-20th century United States–based record label, founded in 1957 and based in Philadelphia, Pennsylvania. It had a subsidiary label called Lawn Records.

== History ==
Swan Records had enjoyed chart success with several U.S. artists but came into the spotlight after EMI, a prestigious British music company headquartered in London, leased the Beatles' recording of "She Loves You" backed with "I'll Get You" and, as catalogue number Swan 4152, it became an American number 1 hit on March 21, 1964. This followed the decision made by EMI's American subsidiary Capitol Records not to exercise its option to release the Beatles singles in the U.S.

Swan also assumed the rights to the German version of "She Loves You", "Sie Liebt Dich" which peaked at No. 97 in 1964.

The success of the "She Loves You" single kept Swan going while other small record labels were snowed under by the British Invasion, but it finally closed filing bankruptcy in 1967.

The company was initially built on the strength of staff producer/writers Bob Crewe and Frank Slay.

Outside of "She Loves You", Swan's most remembered hit was "Palisades Park" in 1962, written by Chuck Barris, and performed by the most successful artist on the label, Freddy Cannon, who also scored hits with "Tallahassee Lassie" and "Way Down Yonder in New Orleans" before moving to Warner Brothers in 1964. Another hit for Swan was a release of The Rockin' Rebels' lone hit, the instrumental "Wild Weekend" which was reissued in 1962 after Buffalo WKBW radio disc jockey Tommy Shannon, partner in ShanTodd records, issued his night show theme of "Wild Weekend". The group also released "Rockin' Crickets" as a follow up. Syracuse disc jockey Jimmy O'Brien used it as his theme on WNDR in Syracuse, New York, attracting the attention of Swan. The re-release on Swan became a national hit. Originally released on the Masters Releasing label Mar-Lee in 1960, Link Wray, best remembered for his classic 1958 instrumental "Rumble", had a modest hit at Swan with "Jack The Ripper".

Swan was co-owned by Bernie Binnick and Tony Mammarella, with Dick Clark reported to having a financial investment in it. When the payola scandals of the early 1960s broke, Clark divested himself of all of his outside interests to avoid conflict of interest. The label was distributed by fellow Philadelphian record company Cameo-Parkway Records, which at the time was the hottest label for teenage dance crazes ("The Twist", "Limbo Rock", "(Do) The Bird", "Wah-Watusi", "Mashed Potato Time", "Gravy (For My Mashed Potatoes)", "Hully Gully Baby", "Bristol Stomp", "(Do the) New Continental").

One of the first hits for the Swan label was "Click Clack" by Dickie Doo and the Don'ts, a studio recording produced by Gerry Granahan under the pseudonym that was actually the nickname Dick Clark called his infant son, Dick Clark, Jr. It reached the top 30 on the Billboard charts in February 1958. But another release by Billy & Lillie had already done much better: "La Dee Dah" reached #9 in January 1958, becoming Swan Records' first top-10 hit.

In 1958, Mary Swan recorded "My Heart Belongs to Only You" #S4016B, and in 1959, she had a moderate hit with "Prisoner of Love", Swan #4028.

The Three Degrees had a moderate hit with a cover version of the Five Keys' "Close Your Eyes", but scored better on Roulette with their remake of the Chantel's "Maybe" and "When Will I See You Again" on Kenny Gamble and Leon Huff's Philadelphia International Records.

In 1973 Masters Releasing, Inc. (Corsican, Mar-Lee, Thunderbird, Sahara record labels) purchased from the bankruptcy Trustee all the sound recording rights of Swan including the master tapes. Masters Releasing was owned at the time by record executives Steve Brodie and Leonard "Lenny" Silver, who later formed Amherst Records. In addition, Freddy Cannon currently has complete control and ownership of his Swan recordings from Masters Releasing, as well as those released by Warner Bros. Records. In the 1980s Freddy Cannon released a single on Amherst Records.

The Swan label bears the message "Don't drop out" on many releases to encourage kids to stay in school.

In 2007, Bruce Spizer released the book The Beatles Swan Song: 'She Loves You' & Other Records. It contains a detailed account of the records of The Beatles on the Swan label, as well as United Artists, Decca, Atco, MGM and Polydor, plus a section about the Capitol releases from the '70s and '80s.

== Swan Records artists ==
- The Beatles ("She Loves You")
- Billy & Lillie
- Buena Vistas
- Freddy Cannon
- Mary Swan
- The Cobras
- Wayne Crawn
- Danny & The Juniors
- Dickey Doo & The Don'ts (Gerry Granahan)
- Sheila Ferguson
- Little Jimmy Rivers and the Tops
- The Sapphires
- Teddy & The Twilights
- The Three Degrees
- Mark Valentino
- Mickey Lee Lane
- Link Wray
- The Rockin' Rebels
- Don Wayne
- Freddy Faulkner

== See also ==
- List of record labels
