= Wild Weekend (instrumental) =

Single by The Rockin' Rebels

from the album Wild Weekend
- B-side: "Wild Weekend (Cha Cha)"
- Released: November 1962
- Genre: Surf rock
- Length: 2:15
- Label: Swan
- Songwriters: Phil Todaro, Tom Shannon

The Rockin' Rebels singles chronology
"Theme from The Rebel" (1961)	"Wild Weekend" (1962)	"Rockin' Crickets" (1963)

"Wild Weekend" is an instrumental written by Phil Todaro and Tom Shannon and performed by The Rebels, later known as The Rockin' Rebels.

The tune was originally heard in a theme song for Shannon's radio show on WKBW in Buffalo, New York. The words "Wild Weekend" are not found in the song's lyrics (Shannon's show aired on weekdays).

The Russ Hallett Trio recorded the original theme for radio airplay by Shannon in 1958. Buffalo band The Rebels reworked it as an instrumental that was released as "Wild Weekend" on the Marlee label in 1960 without national chart success.

In November 1962 the Rebels' single was re-released on the Swan label. The band name was changed to The Rockin' Rebels, apparently to avoid confusion with Duane Eddy And The Rebels. It entered Billboard's national Hot 100 at the end of December with its chart run continuing into 1963 when it peaked at #8, and at #28 on the U.S. R&B chart. The song ranked #22 on Billboard magazine's Top 100 singles of 1963.

"Wild Weekend" was featured on the 1963 Rockin' Rebels album Wild Weekend.

== Other versions ==
- Bill Justis released a version of the song on his 1963 album Bill Justis Plays 12 Instrumental Smash Hits.
- Disc jockey Joey Reynolds (who had worked with Shannon at WWKB) added lyrics to make this the theme song for his nightly show on WPOP, Hartford, 1963.
- The Surfaris released a version of the song on their 1963 album Wipe Out.
- The Thunderbirds from Melbourne, Australia, charted locally with their version in 1961 and upon re-release in 1963.
- Kim Fowley released a version of the song on his 1968 album Born to Be Wild.
- Andy Mackay released a version of the song as a single in 1974 in the UK, but it did not chart. It was featured on his album In Search of Eddie Riff.
- Jon and the Nightriders released a version of the song on their 1987 album Stampede!
- NRBQ released a version of the song as a single in 1989 with lyrics entitled "It's a Wild Weekend", but it did not chart.
- Euphoria's Id released a live version of the song on their 2003 compilation album Mastering the Art of French Kissing.
- The Ventures released a version of the song on their 2009 compilation album with The Fabulous Wailers entitled Two Car Garage (50 Years of Rock 'N Roll).
- The Offbeats on the compilation LP, Do You Wanna Dance - The Best of Frank's Bandstand: Arc Records A669 - a band from Halifax featuring future world class producer, Brian Ahern.
- Beaver Brown released a live version of the song on their 2017 album Live at the Bottom Line 1980.
