= The Rebels (surf band) =

American rock band

The Rebels (also known as The Rockin' Rebels) were a band from Buffalo, New York, known for their instrumental "Wild Weekend". The original members were Jim Kipler (Guitar), Mick Kipler (Saxophone), Tom Gorman (Drums) and Paul Balon (Bass/Guitar).

== "Wild Weekend" ==
"Wild Weekend"

Single by The Rebels
- Released: 1961
- Recorded: 1961
- Genre: Surf rock
- Length: 2:15
- Label: Swan
- Songwriter(s): Tom Shannon, Phil Todaro

The Rebels singles chronology
| "Wild Weekend" (1961) | "Rockin' Crickets" (1962) |

"Wild Weekend" was written by radio entertainer Tom Shannon and Phil Todaro as a theme song for Shannon's WKBW weekend radio show. The lyrics were: "Top tunes, news and weather, so glad we can get together... on the Tom Shannon show... KB radio... KB Radio." It was recorded with vocals and music by the Russ Hallet trio.

A local band, the Buffalo Rebels – or just Rebels – who asked Shannon to play at a record hop also asked if they could play an instrumental-only version of his theme song. They did, and Shannon and Todaro thought there was something to it. They moved the group to a recording studio in the same building where they had a production office. The record came out locally and was a hit, but since it wasn't on a major label, the song did not go any further. It came out on Marlee Records (ML0094) and Casino Records (1307).

Two years later the track was re-issued on Swan Records (Swan 4125). It sold more than 1 million copies, peaked at No. 8 on the Billboard charts and earned an appearance for the band on Dick Clark's "American Bandstand" TV show. The Rockin' Rebels were inducted into the Buffalo Music Hall of Fame in 2002.

To avoid confusion with Duane Eddy and his Rebels, the Rebels became the Rockin' Rebels. Swan pressings can be found with either name; the British Stateside pressings had "Rockin'". The band's 1963 LP uses the name "The Rockin' Rebels".

While the instrumental is the best-known version, the original lyrics were, as mentioned above, a promo for the Shannon radio show. Shannon would tweak the lyrics when he moved to WHTT many years later.

Paul Balon died of heart disease on December 17, 2003, at age 61.

Tom Gorman died; however, no information about his death is available.

Shannon retired in 2005. He died May 26, 2021, in California, following a brief illness. Shannon was 82.

== Discography ==
=== Singles ===
| Year | Title | Peak chart positions | | Record Label | B-side | Album |
| Year | Title | US Pop | US R&B | Record Label | B-side | Album |
|---|---|---|---|---|---|---|
| 1962 | "Wild Weekend" | 8 | 28 | Swan | "Wild Weekend Cha-Cha" | Wild Weekend |
| 1963 | "Rockin' Crickets" | 87 | — | Swan | "Hully Gully Rock" | Wild Weekend |
| 1963 | "Happy Popcorn" | — | — | Swan | "Another Wild Weekend" | |
| 1963 | "Monday Morning" | — | — | Swan | "Flibbity Jibbit" | |
| 1964 | "Bongo Blue Beat" | — | — | Stork | "Burn Baby Burn" | |

== Sources ==
- Osborne Enterprises & Jellyroll Productions
- In the year 1958, several important instrumental acts arrived on the scene from Collectors Universe
- History, from colorradio
- Play the record at YouTube
