= I'm Leaving It Up to You =

1963 single by Dale & Grace

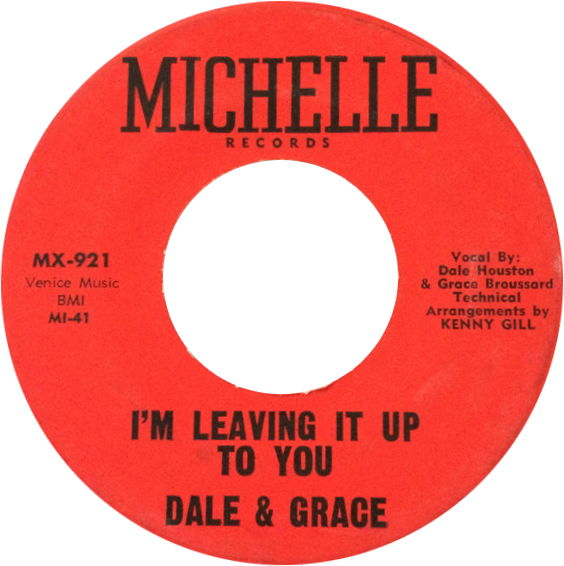
- US single (Michelle) of Dale & Grace recording

Single by Dale & Grace

from the album I'm Leaving It Up to You
- B-side: "That's What I Like About You"
- Released: September 1963
- Recorded: 1963
- Genre: Doo-wop
- Length: 2:13
- Label: Montel
- Songwriters: Don F. Harris, Dewey Terry
- Producer: Sam Montel

Dale & Grace singles chronology
"I'm Leaving It Up to You" (1963)	"Stop and Think It Over" (1964)

"I'm Leaving It Up to You" is a song written by and originally performed by Don Harris and Dewey Terry in 1957. It was later popularized in 1963 by the American duo Dale and Grace, who took it to #1 on the Billboard Hot 100 chart. In 1974, Donny and Marie Osmond reached the top five on the US Hot 100 chart and peaked at #1 on the Billboard Hot Adult Contemporary chart with their cover.

== Dale and Grace version ==
"I'm Leaving It Up to You" first became popular when recorded by the duo Dale and Grace in 1963. Their version became a #1 hit in the United States on the Billboard Hot 100 for two weeks in late 1963, replacing "Deep Purple" by Nino Tempo & April Stevens but ending up one position lower than that record on the 1963 end-of-the-year chart.

The single also spent two weeks atop the easy listening chart. It was the #1 song on the Billboard Hot 100 chart when President John F. Kennedy was assassinated in Dallas, Texas. Dale and Grace were in Dallas on the day of the murder. The duo was scheduled to perform that night as part of Dick Clark's Caravan of Stars (with Bobby Rydell, Jimmy Clanton, and Brian Hyland) and had waved to the president's motorcade from a vantage point near their hotel, moments before the assassination. As a consequence of the assassination, the Dallas Caravan of Stars concert was cancelled, as was the following night's concert in Oklahoma.

=== Weekly charts ===
Chart (1963–64)	Peak position
Canada (CHUM Hit Parade)	2
New Zealand Lever Hit parade	2
US Billboard Hot 100	1
US Billboard Easy Listening	1
US Cash Box Top 100	1

=== Year-end charts ===
Chart (1963)	Rank
US Billboard Hot 100	20

Chart (1964)	Rank
US Cash Box Top 100	27

== Donny and Marie Osmond version ==
"I'm Leaving It (All) Up to You"
- US single of the Donny and Marie recording

Single by Donny and Marie Osmond

from the album I'm Leaving It All Up to You
- B-side: "The Umbrella Song"
- Released: July 1974
- Recorded: Country pop, bubblegum pop
- Length: 2:51
- Label: MGM
- Songwriters: Don F. Harris, Dewey Terry
- Producer: Mike Curb

Donny and Marie Osmond singles chronology
"I'm Leaving It (All) Up to You" (1974)	"Morning Side of the Mountain" (1974)

In 1974, "I'm Leaving It Up to You" (released and noted as "I'm Leaving It (All) Up to You") again became a chart-topping hit in the US when brother and sister duo Donny and Marie Osmond covered it in September, it reached #4 on the Hot 100 and #1 on the easy listening chart. It also reached #2 in the UK. Their version became a gold record, as did the album from which the title track was taken.

=== Weekly charts ===
Chart (1974)	Peak position
Australia (Kent Music Report)	14
Canada RPM Top Singles	4
Canada RPM Adult Contemporary	3
Canada RPM Country	7
France (IFOP)	41
Ireland (IRMA)	3
Netherlands (Single Top 100)	4
UK	2
US Billboard Hot 100	4
US Billboard Easy Listening	1
US Billboard Country	17
US Cash Box Top 100	7

=== Year-end charts ===
Chart (1974)	Rank
Australia (Kent Music Report)	98
Canada RPM Top Singles	62
Netherlands	21
UK	23
US Billboard Hot 100	81
US Billboard Easy Listening	34
US Cash Box Top 100	74

=== Certifications ===
Region	Certification	Certified units/sales
United States (RIAA)	Gold	1,000,000^{^}
^{^} Shipments figures based on certification alone.

== Other versions ==
- A Spanish version, written by Leslie Royal and Héctor Romero of Mexican group Los Jets de Nogales, was recorded by them in 1963 as "Decídelo tú", and by Mexican group Yndio in 1972, under the name "Sin tu amor", with the song's new name used as title for Yndio's album.
- Johnny and Jonie Mosby's version reached #21 on Canada's Country Charts, June 20, 1970.
- Freddy Fender's version reached #20 on Canada's Country Charts, December 16, 1978.
- The Mavericks included it on their 2019 Play the Hits release of favorite covers.

== See also ==
- List of Hot 100 number-one singles of 1963 (U.S.)
- List of number-one adult contemporary singles of 1963 (U.S.)
- List of number-one adult contemporary singles of 1974 (U.S.)
