= Little Johnny Taylor =

American blues and soul singer (1943–2002)

- Born: Johnny Lamont Merrett; February 11, 1943; Gregory, Arkansas, U.S.
- Died: May 17, 2002 (aged 59); Conway, Arkansas
- Occupation: Singer
- Notable work: "Part Time Love", "Everybody Knows About My Good Thing", "Open House at My House"

Little Johnny Taylor (born Johnny Lamont Merrett; February 11, 1943 – May 17, 2002) was an American blues and soul singer. He made recordings throughout the 1960s and 1970s, and continued public performances through the 1980s and 1990s.

== Biography ==
Born in Gregory, Arkansas, United States, he is frequently confused with his contemporary and near namesake Johnnie Taylor, especially since the latter made a cover version of the song that Little Johnny Taylor was most famous for, "Part Time Love" (1963), and the fact that both men began their careers as gospel singers.

Little Johnny Taylor moved to Los Angeles in 1950, and sang with the Mighty Clouds of Joy before moving into secular music. Influenced by Little Willie John, he first recorded as an R&B artist for the Swingin' record label.

However, he did not achieve major success until signing for San Francisco-based Fantasy Records' subsidiary label, Galaxy. His first hit was the mid-tempo blues "You'll Need Another Favor," sung in the style of Bobby Bland, with arrangement by Ray Shanklin and produced by Cliff Goldsmith. The follow-up, "Part Time Love", written by Clay Hammond and featuring Arthur G. Wright on guitar, became his biggest hit, reaching number 1 in the U.S. Billboard R&B chart, and number 19 on the pop chart, in October 1963. However, follow-ups on the Galaxy label were much less successful.

By 1971, Taylor had moved to the Ronn subsidiary label of Jewel Records in Shreveport, Louisiana, where he had his second R&B Top 10 hit with "Everybody Knows About My Good Thing". The following year, he had another hit with "Open House at My House". While at Ronn, Taylor also recorded some duets with Ted Taylor (also unrelated).

Though he recorded only sparingly during the 1980s and 1990s (mostly for Ichiban Records), he remained an active performer until his death, at the age of 59, in May 2002 in Conway, Arkansas, where he lived.

In 2016 The Rolling Stones covered "Everybody Knows About My Good Thing" on their album Blue And Lonesome.

== Chart singles ==
Year	Single	Chart Positions	
Year	Single	US Pop	US R&B
1963	"You'll Need Another Favor"	-	27
1963	"Part Time Love"	19	1
1964	"Since I Found A New Love"	78	*
1966	"Zig Zag Lightning"	-	43
1971	"Everybody Knows About My Good Thing Pt.1"	60	9
1972	"It's My Fault Darling"	-	41
1972	"Open House At My House (Part 1)"	-	16
1973	"I'll Make It Worth Your While"	-	37
1974	"You're Savin' Your Best Loving For Me"	-	83
