= Dale and Grace =

American music duo (1963–1965)

Dale & Grace
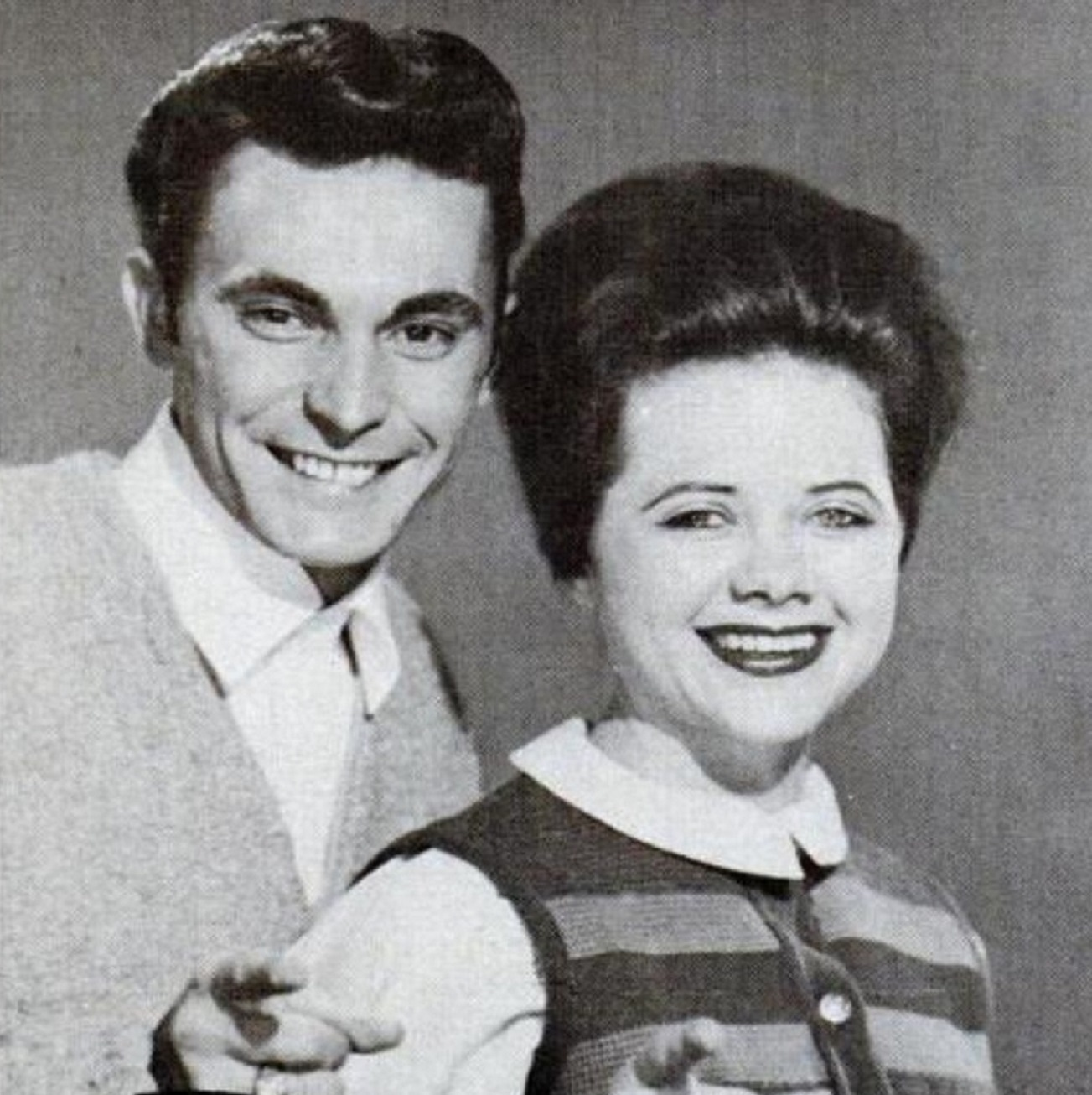
- Dale & Grace, 1963

Background information
- Origin: USA
- Genres: Swamp pop, Rock and roll
- Years active: 1963 - 1965
- Labels: Montel, Michelle
- Past members: Dale Houston; Grace Broussard

Dale & Grace was an American singing duo consisting of Dale Houston (April 23, 1940 – September 27, 2007) and Grace Broussard (born February 5, 1939). They had two Billboard chart hits. The first was the No. 1 gold record "I'm Leaving It Up to You" in 1963. "Stop and Think It Over" reached No. 8 in 1964. The duo broke up in 1965, but they reunited onstage on several occasions. Their recordings are highly regarded examples of the Louisiana-Texas style known as "Swamp Pop".

== Biography ==
=== Early years ===
Robert Dale Houston was born to Claude and Essie (née Walters) Houston in Seminary, a small town in Covington County, Mississippi. He was delivered by a midwife on the family's kitchen table. The Houstons thereafter moved to nearby Collins, the county seat, where Claude Houston entered the Christian ministry. Young Dale began piano lessons in sixth grade, but family financial difficulties halted his training after three months and he was self-taught from then on, honing his skills by playing and singing in church.

At age 18, he recorded "Lonely Man", "(Big Bad) City Police" and "Big Time Operator" on Rocko Records, which became a regional hit. In 1960, while he was performing in Baton Rouge, record executive Sam Montel (Sam Montalbano) caught his act in a local bar. Montel declared him "a pretty good writer" and signed him to compose exclusively for his label. Houston then wrote and recorded "Lonely Man", "Bird with a Broken Wing", and "That's What I Like About You."

Grace Broussard, a year senior to Houston, was born in Prairieville, Louisiana located in south of Baton Rouge in 1939. Her brother was a renowned singer Van Broussard (who later released an album on the Bayou Boogie label), and she had been singing with him since she was sixteen. In 1960, she released a single "Feel So Good" (b/w "Young Girls") with him under the name Van & Grace on Montel Records.

=== Forming the duo ===
In 1963, Houston was working in a bar in Ferriday, Louisiana, a town near Natchez, Mississippi. Montel approached him about teaming up with Grace Broussard. Both had been singing in area bistros for several years.

The two met and practiced on Montel's home piano for four hours. When Houston began to play a song written and recorded in 1957 by African-American performers Don and Dewey--"I'm Leaving it Up to You"—Montel, asleep in the next room, woke up screaming: “Play it again! That's a hit!” The song was soon recorded and released locally on Montel's Michelle label. According to The Billboard Book of Number One Hits by Fred Bronson, the song broke at Top 40 radio station KNUZ in Houston, where it was unanimously voted the "pick hit of the week" by the station's panel of seven deejays. Montel wanted to change the arrangement of the violins, but was persuaded by the KNUZ deejays to leave it as it was. It was nationally distributed as Montel #921 by Philadelphia's Jamie/Guyden Records after negotiations by producer Huey Meaux.

Montel's prophecy was vindicated when "I'm Leaving It Up to You" reached No. 1 on the U.S. chart, where it remained for two weeks. Dale and Grace performed on tour with another Louisiana singer, Jay Chevalier. The song was No. 1 during the week that Kennedy was assassinated and also reached No. 1 on the Billboard Adult Contemporary chart.

The duo appeared on Dick Clark's American Bandstand in August 1964. In autumn 1963, they toured with his Caravan of Stars. The group, which also included Brian Hyland and Bobby Vee, was standing on a street corner on Main Street in Dallas waving at John F. Kennedy on that fateful day. Moments later, the presidential limousine turned right onto, ironically, Houston Street, then left onto Elm Street, where the president was killed and Governor John B. Connally was seriously wounded. The stars had gone back to their hotel rooms after waving to Kennedy and did not hear about the assassination until several hours later.

In 1964, the duo released their debut album I'm Leaving It Up to You and 11 Other Hit Songs.

=== Breaking up ===
The popularity of The Beatles, combined with personal problems between the two performers, Broussard's homesickness, and a serious illness which landed Houston in the hospital, caused the duo to separate in 1965. Grace returned to singing with her brother.

=== Death of Dale Houston ===
Houston died on September 27, 2007, of heart failure at the Wesley Medical Center in Hattiesburg, Mississippi, at the age of 67. At his funeral, his friend Troy Shondell gave a musical tribute, and interment was in Smyrna Cemetery in Collins, Mississippi.

=== Honors ===
In 1995, Dale and Grace, having been reunited, were honored in Mississippi through resolutions of the Covington County Board of Supervisors and the Town of Seminary. In 2000, Houston received the 'Louisiana Living Legends Award' from the Public Broadcasting Service. Earlier, he was inducted into the Texas Music Hall of Fame and the Gulf Coast Music Hall of Fame, both in 1998.

In 2007, newly elected Louisiana Secretary of State Jay Dardenne announced that Houston and Broussard, along with John Fred and the Playboys, were being named to the Delta Music Museum Hall of Fame. To garner such an honor, one must have national or international recognition, said the museum director, Judith Bingham. Dale and Grace performed at the festival in Ferriday, where Houston had attended the ninth and tenth grades decades earlier at Ferriday High School. In October 2007, Dale and Grace were inducted into the Louisiana Music Hall of Fame.

== Dale & Grace discography ==
=== Albums ===
- 1964 I'm Leaving It Up to You and 11 Other Hit Songs - U.S. Billboard No. 109

=== Singles ===
- 1963 "I'm Leaving It Up to You" - U.S. Billboard No. 1 for two weeks; CAN CHUM No. 2
- 1964 "Stop and Think It Over" - U.S. Billboard No. 8; CAN CHUM No. 33
- 1964 "The Loneliest Night" - U.S. Billboard No. 65
- 1964 "Darling It's Wonderful" - U.S. Billboard No. 114
- 1964 "What's Happening to Me" - U.S. Cash Box No. 91
- 1965 "Cool Water" - U.S. Cash Box No. 123

== Sources ==
- Shane K. Bernard, Swamp Pop: Cajun and Creole Rhythm and Blues (Jackson: University Press of Mississippi, 1996), ISBN 978-0878058754
