= Part Time Love =

Single by Little Johnny Taylor

from the album Little Johnny Taylor
- B-side: "Somewhere Down the Line"
- Released: 1963
- Genre: R&B
- Length: 3:16 (single); 3:48 (album)
- Label: Galaxy
- Songwriter: Clay Hammond
- Producer: Cliff Goldsmith

Little Johnny Taylor singles chronology
"You'll Need Another Favor" (1963)	"Part Time Love" (1963)	"Since I Found a New Love" (1963)

"Part Time Love" is a 1963 R&B song written by Clay Hammond and first recorded by Little Johnny Taylor. It was his second release and his most successful on the US Billboard R&B chart. "Part Time Love" was number one on that chart for one week, and was also Taylor's only top 40 entry, reaching number 19.

== Cover versions ==
- Ann Peebles recorded a version in 1970, which reached number seven on the R&B chart and number 45 on the Billboard Hot 100 chart.
- Isaac Hayes recorded an 8:30 version for his 1971 double album, Black Moses.
