= Surf City (song) =

- US picture sleeve

Single by Jan and Dean

from the album Surf City and Other Swingin' Cities
- B-side: "She's My Summer Girl"
- Released: May 17, 1963
- Recorded: March 20, 1963
- Studio: United Western (Hollywood)
- Genre: Vocal surf
- Length: 2:36
- Label: Liberty
- Songwriters: Brian Wilson, Jan Berry
- Producer: Jan Berry

Jan and Dean singles chronology
"Linda" (1963)	"Surf City" (1963)	"Honolulu Lulu" (1963)

Audio sample
- file; help

"Surf City" is a 1963 song recorded by the American music duo Jan and Dean about a fictitious surf spot where there are "two girls for every boy". Written by Brian Wilson and Jan Berry, it was the first surf song to become a national number-one hit.

== Background ==
The first draft of the song, with the working title "Goody Connie Won't You Come Back Home", was written by Brian Wilson of the Beach Boys. While at a party with Jan Berry and Dean Torrence, Wilson played "Surfin' U.S.A." for them on the piano. Berry and Torrence suggested that they do the song as a single, but Wilson refused, as "Surfin' U.S.A." was intended for the Beach Boys. Wilson then suggested that the duo record "Surf City" instead, demoing the opening, verse, and chorus. Wilson had lost interest in the song and believed he was never going to complete it himself. Berry later contributed additional writing to the song, while Torrence also contributed several phrases, but never insisted that he be given writing credit.

== Recording ==
Hal Blaine, Glen Campbell, Earl Palmer, Bill Pitman, Ray Pohlman and Billy Strange are identified as players for the single per the American Federation of Musicians contract. According to Beach Boys historian Andrew G. Doe and Jan & Dean historian Mark A. Moore, Brian Wilson also sang on this song.

== Release ==
Released in May 1963, two months later it became the first surf song to reach number one on national record charts, remaining at the top of the Billboard Hot 100 for two weeks. The single crossed over to the Billboard R&B Chart where it peaked at number 3. It also charted in the UK, reaching number 26. Before the single, Jan and Dean made music which was largely inspired by East Coast black vocal group records. The success of "Surf City" gave them a unique sound and identity which would be followed by five more top ten hits inspired by Los Angeles surf or hot rod life.

The Beach Boys' manager and Wilson's father Murry was reportedly irate about the song, believing that Brian had wasted a number one record which could have gone to his group, the Beach Boys. Brian later told Teen Beat, "I was proud of the fact that another group had had a number 1 track with a song I had written ... But dad would hear none of it. ... He called Jan a 'record pirate'."

The single's picture sleeve featured a photo of Jan and Dean with future actress Linda Gaye Scott. (A different photo from the same session appeared on the cover of their "Jan And Dean Take Linda Surfin'" album.)

== Legacy ==
In 1991, after moving to Huntington Beach, California, Dean Torrence helped convince elected officials that the town be officially nicknamed Surf City. In 2006, the official trademark of "Surf City USA" was registered to Huntington Beach with the U.S. Patent & Trademark Office after an extended legal challenge from merchants in Santa Cruz. As of 2024, more than 90 businesses in the city included "Surf City" as part of their name.

== In popular culture ==
The song was one of many California related songs played throughout "Sunshine Plaza" in the original Disney California Adventure.

The song is used in the 2015 city-building game Cities: Skylines's Gold F.M. radio.

== Chart performance ==
Chart (1963)	Peak position
Australia (Kent Music Report)	1
Canada (CHUM Chart)	2
UK Singles (The Official Charts Company)	26
US Billboard Hot 100	1
US Billboard Hot R&B Singles	3

== Other versions ==
- 1963 – The Delltones, single
- 1964 - The Rip Chords, Three Window Coupe
- 1966 - The Brackets (South African band), single
- 1986 – The Meteors, Surf City
- 1989 – Sonic Surf City, Let's Go Surfin
- 1993 – Ramones, Acid Eaters
- 2001 - The Go-Go's, An All-Star Tribute to Brian Wilson (DVD)
