= If You Wanna Be Happy =

1963 single by Jimmy Soul

Single by Jimmy Soul

from the album If You Wanna Be Happy
- B-side: "Don't Release Me"
- Released: January 1963
- Genre: Doo-wop
- Length: 2:14
- Label: S.P.Q.R.; London
- Songwriters: Rafael de Leon; Joseph Royster; Carmella Guida; Frank Guida

Jimmy Soul singles chronology
"My Baby Loves to Bowl" (1962)	"If You Wanna Be Happy" (1963)	"Treat 'Em Tough" (1963)

"If You Wanna Be Happy" is a 1963 song recorded by Jimmy Soul, written by Rafael de Leon and adapted by Joseph Royster, Carmella Guida and Frank Guida.

== Background ==
"If You Wanna Be Happy" is based on the song "Ugly Woman" by the Trinidadian calypsonian Roaring Lion (writing credited to his real name, Rafael de Leon), recorded in 1934. It hit #1 on the Hot 100 on May 18, 1963, as well as on the R&B singles chart. It was issued on Frank Guida's S.P.Q.R. label and distributed by London Records, and in the United Kingdom on EMI's Stateside label, the same month "Please Please Me" by The Beatles put EMI on the map.

== Releases ==
The single was released in New Zealand on the Allied International label.

== Cover versions ==
- Claude François covered the song in French under the title "Si tu veux être heureux" in 1963. The song hit number 1 in France and number 5 in Wallonia, the French-speaking region of Belgium.
- Joe Dolce's cover of the song in 1981 charted in Australia and New Zealand.
