= The Essex =

American R&B vocal group

The Essex was an American R&B vocal group formed in 1962. They are best known for their 1963 song "Easier Said Than Done".

== Career ==
Founding members Walter Vickers (guitar) and Rodney Taylor (drums) were members of the United States Marine Corps stationed in Okinawa, Japan. After being transferred to Camp LeJeune in North Carolina, they enlisted fellow Marines Billy Hill (aka Billy Proctor) and Rudolph Johnson as group members. Next they added a female lead singer, Anita Humes, another Marine.

The band was signed to a recording contract in 1963 after submitting a demo to Roulette Records. "Easier Said Than Done" was written by Larry Huff and William Linton. Released as the B side of their first single, the song reached the top of the U.S. Billboard Hot 100 chart. The track sold over one million records and received a gold disc award from the R.I.A.A. "Easier Said Than Done" charted at No. 41 in the UK Singles Chart in August 1963.

Rudolph Johnson left the group, and the Essex became a quartet. Three months after "Easier Said Than Done" reached No. 1 in July 1963, the group had a No. 12 Billboard hit with the follow-up song, "A Walkin' Miracle" in September 1963. On the label of this single, the group name appeared as The Essex Featuring Anita Humes. "She's Got Everything", their next single, written by Jimmy Radcliffe and Oramay Diamond, was a Billboard No. 56 hit. Being Marines made it hard for the group to take advantage of their hits; for example, before long, Johnson was posted to Okinawa. Rodney Taylor was killed in 1966 in New York City during an attempted mugging. He was buried at Oak Hill Cemetery in Gary, Indiana. All of his former bandmates attended his funeral.

Humes released several solo singles for Roulette, but had no chart success. She died on May 30, 2010, in Harrisburg, Pennsylvania, aged 69. In the 1970s, Hill headed up a group called the Courtship.

== Band member origins ==
- Walter Vickers - New Brunswick, New Jersey
- Rodney Taylor - Gary, Indiana
- Rudolph Johnson - New York
- Willie "Billy" Hill - Princeton, New Jersey
- Anita Humes - Harrisburg, Pennsylvania

== Discography ==
=== Albums ===
Year	Album	Label	US 200
1963	Easier Said Than Done	Roulette Records	119
1963	A Walkin' Miracle	Roulette Records	—
1964	Young & Lively - Featuring Anita Humes with the Essex	Roulette Records	—
1994	The Best of the Essex	Sequel Records	—
"—" denotes releases that did not chart.

=== Singles ===
Year	Title	Peak chart positions		
Year	Title	US Pop	US R&B	UK
1963	"Easier Said Than Done"	1	—	41
1963	"A Walkin' Miracle"	12	11	―
1963	"She's Got Everything"	56	―	―
1964	"Curfew Lover" (with Anita Humes)	―	―	―
1966	"The Eagle"	―	―	―
1967	"Everybody's Got You (For Their Own)" (with Anita Humes)	―	―	―
"—" denotes releases that did not chart or were not released in that territory.

== See also ==
- List of artists who reached number one in the United States
- List of artists who reached number one on the Billboard R&B chart
- List of R&B musicians
