= Easier Said Than Done (The Essex song) =

1963 single by the Essex

Single by the Essex

from the album Easier Said Than Done
- A-side: "Are You Going My Way"
- Released: May 1963
- Genre: Pop
- Length: 2:08
- Label: Roulette
- Songwriters: William Linton, Larry Huff
- Producers: George Goldner, Henry Glover

The Essex singles chronology
| "Easier Said Than Done" (1963) | "A Walkin' Miracle" (1963) |

"Easier Said Than Done" is a popular song sung by The Essex that was a number-one song in the United States during 1963. It topped the Billboard Hot 100 singles chart on July 6, 1963, and remained there for two weeks. The song was written by William Linton and Larry Huff.

The Essex were active-duty members of the United States Marine Corps at the time, as was Linton, who wrote the song at the request of Essex member Walter Vickers. Linton said the song's rhythm was inspired by the sound of the Teletype machines in the communications office at Camp Lejeune. The group was not thrilled with the composition, but recorded it for use as the B-side of their debut single, "Are You Going My Way". The B-side recording was unusually short, and editing was used to repeat part of the recording; even so, the song ran only a little over two minutes. It was the A-side, "Are You Going My Way", that was officially released in May 1963, but "Easier Said Than Done" quickly emerged as the more popular side. It became a major hit with broad appeal, reaching number 1 on both the pop and rhythm and blues charts. The song became the title track of the group's first album, which reached number 113 on the Billboard album chart, becoming their only charting album.

== Chart history ==
=== Weekly charts ===
| Chart (1963) | Peak position |
|---|---|
| Canada (CHUM Hit Parade) | 4 |
| New Zealand (Lever Hit Parade) | 1 |
| UK | 41 |
| US Billboard Hot 100 | 1 |
| US Billboard R&B | 1 |
| US Cash Box Top 100 | 1 |

=== Year-end charts ===
| Chart (1963) | Rank |
|---|---|
| US Billboard Hot 100 | 39 |
| US Cash Box Top 100 | 20 |
