= Jimmy Soul =

American singer (1942–1988)

Background information
- Born: James Louis McCleese; August 24, 1942; Weldon, North Carolina, United States
- Died: June 25, 1988 (aged 45) Spring Valley, New York, United States
- Genres: Pop, soul
- Occupation: Singer

Jimmy Soul (born James Louis McCleese; August 24, 1942 – June 25, 1988) was an American vocalist. He is best remembered for his 1963 number one hit, "If You Wanna Be Happy."

== Background ==
Born in Weldon, North Carolina, he became a preacher at the age of seven and performed gospel music as a teenager. He acquired his performing name, "Soul", from his congregation.

Soul took to the road and toured the Southern United States as a member of various gospel groups. During this time he became popular around the Norfolk, Virginia area. It was here that Soul was scouted by Frank Guida and recruited to sing songs handpicked for one of Guida's other hit artists, Gary U.S. Bonds.

== Success ==
Soul had two top-40 hit singles, both of which were refused by Bonds. They were on the SPQR label, distributed by London Records. The first was "Twistin' Matilda", which peaked at No. 22 on the Billboard Hot 100 for the week ending May 26, 1962, while peaking three weeks later at No. 20 on the Billboard Hot R&B Singles chart. The other was "If You Wanna Be Happy", which was the No. 1 hit for the week ending May 18, 1963. The single was released in New Zealand on the Allied International label. The latter, which also hit No. 1 on the Hot R&B Singles chart, was based on the calypso "Ugly Woman", by Roaring Lion.

"If You Wanna Be Happy" sold over one million records, earning gold disc status. It had two spells in the UK Singles Chart, peaking at No. 39 (1963) and No. 68 (1991).

== Later years ==
Soul's next single, "Treat 'Em Tough", peaked at No. 8 on the Bubbling Under Hot 100; his last appearance on a Billboard chart. After unsuccessfully trying to follow up the success of those songs with one more album, Soul gave up his career as a musician and joined the United States Army.

Later in life, Soul fell into a drug habit, and on January 9, 1986, was sentenced to four-and-a-half to nine years in prison as a second felony offender, convicted of criminal sale of a controlled substance in the third degree and criminal possession of a controlled substance in the third degree. The sentence was affirmed upon appeals on October 26, 1987, and March 22, 1988.

Soul died of a heart attack on June 25, 1988, aged 45.

== Discography ==
=== Singles ===
Year	Title	Peak chart positions			Record Label	B-side	Album
Year	Title	US Pop	US R&B	UK	Record Label	B-side	Album
1961	"Twistin' Matilda (And the Channel)"	22	20	—	S.P.Q.R.	"I Can't Hold Out Any Longer"	If You Wanna Be Happy
1962	"When Matilda Comes Back"	—	—	—	S.P.Q.R.	"Some Kinda Nut?"	If You Wanna Be Happy
1962	"My Baby Loves to Bowl"	—	—	—	S.P.Q.R.	"Guess Things Happen That Way"	
1963	"If You Wanna Be Happy"	1	1	39	S.P.Q.R.	"Don't Release Me"	If You Wanna Be Happy
1963	"Treat 'Em Tough"	108	—	—	S.P.Q.R.	"Church Street in the Summertime"	If You Wanna Be Happy
1963	"I Wish I Could Dance"	—	—	—	20th Century-Fox	"Respectable"	
1963	"Go 'Way Christina"	—	—	—	S.P.Q.R.	"Everybody's Gone Ape"	
1963	"I Hate You Baby"	—	—	—	S.P.Q.R.	"Change Partners"	
1964	"A Woman Is Smarter in Every Kinda Way"	—	—	—	S.P.Q.R.	"My Girl - She Sure Can Cook"	
1964	"Take Me to Los Angeles"	—	—	—	S.P.Q.R.	"You Can't Have Your Cake"	
1964	"Twistin' Matilda (And the Channel)"	—	—	—	S.P.Q.R.	"Treat 'Em Tough"	
1965	"My Little Room"	—	—	—	S.P.Q.R.	"Ella Is Yella"	
