= Teenage Tragedies =

Compilation album by Various artists
- Released: 1984
- Recorded: 1958–83
- Genre: Teenage tragedy song
- Label: Rhino Records

Teenage Tragedies (a.k.a. Teenage Tragedy) is a compilation album of teen tragedy songs released on Rhino Records in 1984.

== Release data ==
The album was conceived and compiled by Rhino Records co-founder Richard Foos. Boasting some "of the bossest splatter platters ever recorded," the album collects 10 examples of the teenage tragedy song including parodies of the genre. Most are from the late 1950s and early 1960s, with one track from the MTV era. Chart positions for each song, noted next to the track listing on the back cover, list eight of the selections as Top 10 hits (two of which went to No. 1) at the time of their original release. The grisly "I Want My Baby Back" (also included on The Rhino Brothers Present the World's Worst Records in 1983) made the lower reaches of the Billboard Hot 100 in 1965. The last song on the album, Julie Brown's "Homecoming Queen's Got a Gun," was first independently released as a B-side in late 1983 and never officially charted; the following year, it was included on Goddess in Progress, a Rhino EP (catalog no. RNEP610) that immediately preceded this album (RNEP611) and became one of Rhino's biggest sellers of the mid-'80s.

The compilation was first issued as a vinyl LP, titled "Teenage Tragedies" on the spine and "Teenage Tragedy" in the cover art and on the labels. Following Rhino's distribution deal with Capitol/EMI in 1986, EMI Distribution released a budget-line cassette version in October 1989. The album has not been reissued on compact disc.

== Packaging ==
At the time of the album's release, Rhino, founded in 1975, was still very much a novelty label, and the album cover bears the legend "The Rhino Brothers Present A Specially Priced Collection Of Dream-Date Discs With A Death Wish."

The cover art by Scott Shaw parodies, and is an homage to, romance comics of the 1950s such as Teen-Age Romances. Shaw's Teenage Tragedy comic book cover reflects the maudlin content of the songs within, with "Torrid Tunes of Terminal Teens" and a cover story teaser for "Prom Night of the Living Dead." The LP sleeve's back cover is die-cut, with a faux-3D image of a box of tissues, and one paper tissue glued into the packaging. (The tongue-in-cheek nature of the release extends to a back-cover testimonial by one Morey Jay, allegedly a DJ on Milwaukee AM station "KILH" – fake call letters that are unrelated to FM station WKLH, which began broadcasting in Milwaukee two years later, in 1986.)

== Reception ==
Chicago Tribune music critic Tom Popson, reviewing the LP in 1985, wrote that the album reflects "a genre that had its heyday 20 to 25 years ago" and "is filled with the sad, shabby stories of young lovers who suffered the utmost in heart-wrenching, garment-rending, maximum-melodrama agony.”

In SPIN’s November 1988 issue, writer Legs McNeil noted the compilation's appeal – “This LP makes us here at SPIN nostalgic for great slaughtered-teen tear-jerkers and gives us pause to wonder why there are not modernized versions of the genre”. For a related contest, McNeil invited readers, “in the interest of resurrecting this vital aspect of rock’n’roll lore,” to submit ideas for “Teen Tragedy Update: Song Titles We’d Like to See.” The magazine offered as prizes five copies of the LP that inspired the contest.

== Track listing ==
Side A

1. "Endless Sleep"* – Jody Reynolds
2. "Teen Angel" – Mark Dining (sic)
3. "Tell Laura I Love Her" – Ray Peterson
4. "Leader of the Pack" – The Shangri-Las
5. "Patches" – Dickie Lee (sic)

Side B

1. "Last Kiss" – J. Frank Wilson
2. "Dead Man's Curve"* – Jan & Dean
3. "I Can Never Go Home Anymore" – The Shangri-Las
4. "I Want My Baby Back" – Jimmy Cross
5. "Homecoming Queen's Got a Gun" – Julie Brown

* = denotes re-recorded version
