= Teenage tragedy song =

Style of ballad

A teenage tragedy song is a style of sentimental ballad in popular music that peaked in popularity in the United States in the late 1950s and early 1960s. Lamenting teenage death scenarios in melodramatic fashion, these songs were variously sung from the viewpoint of the dead person's romantic interest, another witness to the tragedy, or the dead or dying person. Examples of the style are also known as "tear jerkers", "death discs" or "splatter platters", among other names coined by DJs that passed into the vernacular.

Notable examples of teenage tragedy songs include "Teen Angel" by Mark Dinning (1959), "Tell Laura I Love Her" by Ray Peterson (1960), "Ebony Eyes" by the Everly Brothers (1961), "Last Kiss" by Wayne Cochran (1961), "Dead Man's Curve" by Jan and Dean (1964), "Leader of the Pack" by the Shangri-Las (1964). The genre's popularity faded around 1965 amid the British Invasion, but the form has inspired many similar songs and parodies since.

== Origins and format ==
By the mid-1950s, postwar youth culture in the United States was embracing rock and roll, and the folk revival was also approaching its zenith—the narrative style of many teenage tragedy songs would have similarities to folk ballads. Prison ballads (such as the Kingston Trio's "Tom Dooley", based on a folk song about a real murder) and gunfighter ballads (such as Johnny Cash's "Don't Take Your Guns to Town" and Marty Robbins' "El Paso") were also popular during the teenage tragedy song's heyday; "El Paso" was followed at #1 by two consecutive teenage tragedy songs, "Running Bear" and "Teen Angel".

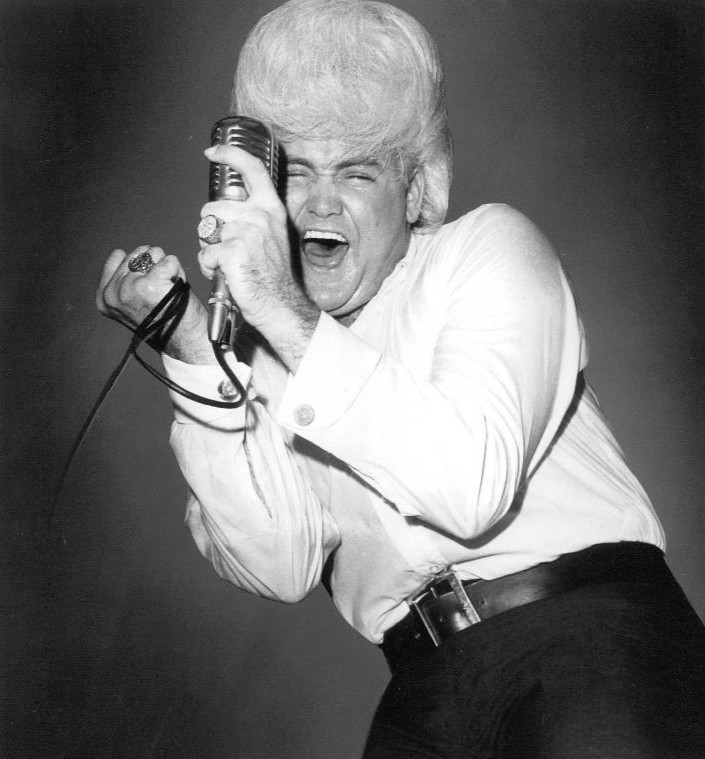
Wayne Cochran first performed the song "Last Kiss" which would later be recorded by J Frank Wilson, Wednesday, and Pearl Jam in 1964, 1974 and 1999 respectively).

The teenage tragedy genre's popular era began with "Black Denim Trousers and Motorcycle Boots" by the Cheers, written by Jerry Leiber and Mike Stoller. Released just before James Dean's death in an automobile accident in the fall of 1955, it climbed the charts immediately afterward. Teenage tragedies featured specific thematic tropes such as star-crossed lovers, reckless youth, eternal devotion, suicide, and despair over lost love, along with lyrical elements that teens of the time could relate to their own lives such as dating, motorcycles and automobiles, and disapproving parents or peers. Contemporary girl groups borrowed the genre's melodramatic template and use of sound effects, orchestration, and echo for other story-songs.

Ethnomusicologist Kirsten Zemke considers these songs as forming a strictly musical genre that was bound by common themes, musical style, and production elements, and as being particularly of their time. As for their popularity, she writes:

They sold well in their time, and the style has persisted throughout the decades in various forms. And … they have an interesting history. The question some writers have asked is "why?". Some of the reasons suggested for this genre’s macabre popularity are:

These were the ultimate teen rebellion songs. The only way out of parents' (and/or societal) control and expectations was death.
They were a natural extension of the "unrequited love" song, facilitated by the obvious rhyming of: good bye, cry and die.

Zemke also speculates that the popularity of teenage tragedy songs may be due in part to the many publicized deaths of young musicians and actors during their period of prominence, including those of Sam Cooke, Johnny Ace, Eddie Cochran, Buddy Holly, Ritchie Valens, and the Big Bopper.

== Examples ==
Title	Original artist	Year	Songwriter(s)	Synopsis	Notes
"Black Denim Trousers and Motorcycle Boots"	The Cheers	1955	Jerry Leiber, Mike Stoller	Motorcyclist ignores his girlfriend's plea to not ride that night and collides with speeding train, presumed dead but never found.	U.S. #6.
"Endless Sleep"	Jody Reynolds	1958	Jody Reynolds, Dolores Nance	Man believes his girlfriend has drowned, goes to the sea to do the same but finds and saves her.	Precursor of the genre. The song's original ending was to have the man's girlfriend die, but it was changed at the request of the record company to give the song a happy ending. U.S. #5.
"The Grave"	Tony Casanova	1958	Tony Casanova	Boyfriend laments the death of his girlfriend, cause of death unspecified.	
"Running Bear"	Johnny Preston	1959	J. P. Richardson (The Big Bopper)	Star-crossed Native Americans from rival tribes are separated by a raging river; they swim through said river, embrace each other and drown.	The chart success followed Richardson's own death in a plane crash along with Buddy Holly and Ritchie Valens. U.S. #1.
"The Ballad of Angel"	Bobby Swanson	1959	Bobby Swanson	Narrator's girlfriend has died, cause unspecified.	
"Teen Angel"	Mark Dinning	1959	Jean Dinning, Red Surrey	Couple's car stalls on railroad track; boyfriend pulled girl out in time but she ran back to get his ring and died. He later watches her burial.	U.S. #1.
"Tell Laura I Love Her"	Ray Peterson	1960	Jeff Barry, Ben Raleigh	Protagonist dies in an automobile racing accident while trying to win the $1,000 prize money to buy an engagement ring.	Cover by Ricky Valance was #1 in the UK. U.S. #7.
"The Water Was Red"	Johnny Cymbal	1960	Stanley Wagner	Narrator meets girl on the beach, then she dies in a shark attack. Devastated, the narrator picks up a knife and sets off to kill the shark in retribution.	
"Ebony Eyes"	The Everly Brothers	1961	John D. Loudermilk	Protagonist's fiancée dies in a plane crash on the way to the wedding.	U.S. #8, UK #1, Can. #2
"The Prom"	Del Shannon	1961	Del Shannon	Narrator is on his way to the high school prom, sees his date fatally injured in a car accident.	
"Moody River"	Pat Boone	1961	Gary D. Bruce	Singer's girlfriend commits suicide by drowning.	U.S. #1.
"Johnny Remember Me"	John Leyton	1961	Geoff Goddard	Protagonist's girlfriend died a year ago, cause unspecified, he still misses her.	Produced by Joe Meek; later covered by psychobilly band The Meteors. UK #1.
"Last Kiss"	Wayne Cochran & the C.C. Riders	1961	Wayne Cochran	Narrator and his girlfriend are in an automobile accident; she dies in his arms.	The J. Frank Wilson and the Cavaliers cover was a 1964 U.S. #2; Cover by Pearl Jam was a 1999 U.S. #2.
"Jimmy Love"	Cathy Carroll	1961	Jody Reynolds, Bert Carroll	Narrator walks home with her fiance, lightning strikes a tree, a branch breaks off and kills him.	
"Star Crossed Lovers"	The Mystics	1961	T. Cooper & E. Zolas	Young couple elope, die in car crash.	B-side of "Goodbye Mr Blues".
"The Ballad of Billy Brown"	Mort (Doc) Downey, Jr.	1961	Mort Downey Jr.	Boyfriend has unexpectedly died, cause unspecified.	
"A Thousand Feet Below"	Terry Tyler	1961	C. Miller-Munn & J.W. Foster	Girlfriend commits suicide, boyfriend blames himself but does not specify why, decides to do it too.	
"Leah"	Roy Orbison	1962	Roy Orbison	Protagonist thinks he is drowning while diving for pearls to give as love tokens, wakes and realizes it is a dream about his "lost love." Whether that means she had died or left him is unclear.	U.S. #25, Can. #7
"Call Me Lonesome"	Arthur Alexander	1962	Arthur Alexander	At a party another man dances with protagonist's girlfriend; when challenged, he stabs protagonist to death.	Unreleased until 1987; early version of "Lonely Just Like Me"
"Patches"	Dickey Lee	1962	Barry Mann, Larry Kolber	Patches commits suicide by drowning; her boyfriend follows suit.	U.S. #6.
"Echo"	The Emotions	1962	The Emotions, Henry Boye	Narrator reminisces about the time he crashed a car and his girlfriend died.	
"Chapel Bells Ringing"	Gene Summers	1962	M. Torver	Protagonist's fiancée has died, cause unspecified.	
"Oh, Susie Forgive Me"	Kenny Karen	1962	Barry Mann & Cynthia Weil	Reckless boyfriend crashes car leaving girlfriend paraplegic; he robs a store to fund her surgery, gets shot by cops and lies dying at her feet as he realises she can walk after all.	
"The Pickup"	Mark Dinning	1962	Helen Carter	Narrator on a first date feels overwhelmed by his strength of feeling for the girl, is embarrassed so says he does not want to see her again; she swiftly kills herself and he is sad.	B-side of "All of This for Sally".
"Tragic Honeymoon"	Cody Brennan & the Temptations	1962	Tony Lindauer	Narrator recalls his friends; newlyweds get distracted while driving, crash and die.	
"Teenage Honeymoon"	Kenny Ancel	1962	Buddy Mize	Newlyweds killed in a car crash.	
"A Tear for Jesse"	Jody Reynolds	1963	George R Brown, Dennis Hardesty	Couple try to elope but her parents catch them; she commits suicide.	
"The Girl From King Marie"	Jody Reynolds	1963	Jody Reynolds	Singer's girlfriend dies after being struck by lightning.	
"A Young Man Is Gone"	The Beach Boys	1963	Bobby Troup, Mike Love	Man dies in car crash.	Though it does not mention him by name, it appears to refer to James Dean.
"B.J. the D.J."	Stonewall Jackson	1963	Hugh X. Lewis	Country music radio DJ gets little sleep and drives a poorly maintained car, with fatal results.	U.S. Country #1
"Dead Man's Curve"	Jan and Dean	1964	Jan Berry, Roger Christian, Brian Wilson, Artie Kornfeld	Narrator takes a dare to street race along a dangerous curve; his opponent dies and he is hospitalized.	U.S. #8.
"Terry"	Twinkle	1964	Lynn Ripley (Twinkle)	Couple have an argument, boy leaves on his motorcycle and fatally injures himself; unclear if it was deliberate.	UK #4
"Leader of the Pack"	The Shangri-Las	1964	George "Shadow" Morton, Jeff Barry, Ellie Greenwich	Jimmy, the titular motorcycle gang leader, rides off recklessly and is killed in a motorcycle crash after his girlfriend (the singer) breaks up with him at her father's insistence.	U.S. #1, Can. #3.
"The Hero"	Bernadette Carroll	1964	B. Nosal, P. Maheu	Protagonist's fiance is a high school football player, his team bus crashes and kills everyone aboard.	A regional airplay hit in North Carolina (#1), Florida, West Virginia and elsewhere
"Down Where the Woodbine Twineth"	Jody Reynolds	1964	Jody Reynolds	Singer breaks up with girlfriend; later changes his mind and returns only to find that she has hanged herself.	
"Laurie (Strange Things Happen)"	Dickey Lee	1965	Milton Addington, Cathie Harmon	Narrator recounts a tale similar to the story of Resurrection Mary.	U.S. #14, Can. #6.
"Give Us Your Blessings"	The Shangri-Las	1965	Jeff Barry, Ellie Greenwich	When a girl's parents do not approve of her boyfriend, the couple elopes and both die in a car crash with an unspecified cause. (Vision impeded by tears is suggested.)	U.S. #29, Can. #11
"I Can Never Go Home Anymore"	The Shangri-Las	1965	George "Shadow" Morton	Following an argument with her mother, the narrator runs away only to regret it when her mother dies of a broken heart.	U.S. #6, Can. #2.
"A Young Girl of Sixteen"	Noel Harrison	1965	Charles Aznavour, Oscar Brown Jr., Robert Chauvigny	Rich girl elopes with a man who eventually leaves her; she dies in an unspecified manner.	From a French song recorded by Aznavour in 1959 and by Edith Piaf in 1951. U.S. #51, Can. #5.
"Nightmare"	Lori Burton/ The Whyte Boots	1966	Pam Sawyer, Lori Burton	Girl's boyfriend goes off with another girl; goaded on by her friends, she attacks the other girl and accidentally kills her.	"The Whyte Boots" were a fabricated girl group; Burton sang lead and the track is on her 1967 LP Breakout
"Ode to Billie Joe"	Bobbie Gentry	1967	Bobbie Gentry	Local boy jumps off a bridge to his death; narrator's family is somewhat indifferent. Preacher comments that narrator had been with the boy throwing an unidentified object off the same bridge not long before he jumped.	U.S. #1, Can. #1
"Condition Red"	The Goodees	1968	Don Davis, Freddie Briggs	Girl's parents disapprove of her boyfriend; he leaves on his motorcycle and immediately fatally crashes into a car.	U.S. #46, Can. #14
"Sweet Rosie Jones"	Buck Owens	1968	Buck Owens	Protagonist's girlfriend falls for another man; she says she would 'rather die than hurt you', but it is unclear if she actually does die; either way, he plans to drown himself in response.	Title track from Owens' album of the same name. #2 US Country, #4 CAN Country.
"D.O.A."	Bloodrock	1971	Jim Rutledge, Lee Pickens, Ed Grundy, Chris Taylor, Stevie Hill, Rick Cobb	Airplane pilot crashes with something in mid-air and survives only long enough to describe his maimed state and last recollections to paramedics.	U.S. #36
"Seasons in the Sun"	Terry Jacks	1974	Jacques Brel, Rod McKuen	Young adult man dictates to his father, best friend and daughter his last words before dying from something alcohol-related.	English-language adaptation of Brel's "Le Moribond". CAN #1, US #1, UK #1
"Emma"	Hot Chocolate	1974	Errol Brown, Tony Wilson	Teen sweethearts get married; some time later the wife kills herself due to failure to be a film star.	U.S. #8, U.K. #3
"Run Joey Run"	David Geddes	1975	Paul Vance & Jack Perricone	Protagonist gets his girlfriend pregnant; her father goes after him with a gun; girlfriend pleads with father for mercy; father accidentally shoots daughter; angels sing.	US Billboard #4, Cash Box #1; Canada #12
"Hello, This Is Joanie"	Paul Evans	1978	Paul Evans, Fred Tobias	Protagonist had a drunken argument with titular girlfriend and she left in anger and died in a car crash; he consoles himself by listening to the outgoing message on her answering machine.	UK #6
"Bat Out of Hell"	Meat Loaf	1978	Jim Steinman	Protagonist is a speeding motorcyclist who takes a curve too fast and crashes to the sound of drums and guitar. The biker lies fatally injured and can feel his "heart still beating." The refrain "I'll be gone when the morning comes" becomes a double entendre, signaling both leaving his lover and his impending death. Inspired by "Leader of the Pack", "Terry" and "Tell Laura I Love Her", Steinman has said he wanted to write the "most extreme crash song of all time".	UK #8

== Deathless themes ==
As popular music and the society it mirrored changed from the late 1960s onward, the themes of teenage tragedy songs carried on in different forms and styles. Songs and spoken-word productions about the dangers of drug abuse ranged from three-minute morality plays to lamentations on the generation gap. These include "Once You Understand" by Think (U.S. #23, 1971) and radio and TV host Art Linkletter's Grammy-winning single "We Love You, Call Collect" (U.S. #42, 1969). Recorded before his daughter Diane's apparent suicide in 1969, the record also included Diane speaking the reply, "Dear Mom and Dad". Into the 1970s, as the Vietnam War continued, hit ballads of youth and death included Terry Jacks' No. 1 hit "Seasons in the Sun" (1974), their protagonists of indeterminate age, or slightly older than teens. A song that was thought to have referenced the Civil War was Paper Lace's 1974 hit "Billy Don't Be a Hero", made a bigger hit in the U.S. by Bo Donaldson and the Heywoods. Hard-rock acts recorded vehicular death scenarios such as "D.O.A." (Bloodrock, 1971), "Detroit Rock City" (Kiss, 1976), and "Bat Out of Hell" (Meat Loaf, 1977).

Teenage tragedy themes would continue to chart through the 1970s. In 1979, the Boomtown Rats' "I Don't Like Mondays", inspired by the Grover Cleveland school shooting in San Diego earlier that year, reached No. 1 in the U.K., and No. 4 in Canada. The Smiths' 1987 song "Girlfriend in a Coma" also took inspiration from teenage tragedy songs. Some songs merely updated the sound of the previous era, such as "Racing Car" by Dutch group Air Bubble (1976), while others used the melodic and stylistic tropes of teen tragedy in tougher, grittier settings, as in the Ramones' "You're Gonna Kill That Girl" (1977) and "7-11" (1981), and the Misfits' "Saturday Night" (1999). "Teen Idle" by Marina and the Diamonds (2012), evoking an archetype of disenfranchised youth, is a thematic heir to the original teen tragedy oeuvre.

== Parodies ==
Notable parodies of teenage tragedy songs over the decades have included:

- "Let's Think About Living" (1960), with Bob Luman mocking then-current musical trends, and trying to steer listeners away from the fascination with teenage death songs and gunfighter ballads.
- "Valerie", a 1961 doo-wop styled teen tragedy spoof by the Mark III, a young folk trio.
- "All I Have Left is Johnny's Hubcap" on the 1962 parody album, Mad “Twists” Rock ’n’ Roll, produced in association with Mad magazine.
- "Surfin' Tragedy" (1963) by the Breakers, in which a surfer careens "90 miles an hour" into a Malibu pier, killing him instantly. It is included on The Rhino Brothers Present the World's Worst Records.
- "Leader of the Laundromat" by the Detergents (1964), a parody of "Leader of the Pack" written by Paul Vance and Lee Pockriss. The Detergents were a studio group that included singer Ron Dante, later of the Archies.
- Jimmy Cross's "I Want My Baby Back" (1965), a novelty record about a fatal head-on collision with the title character of "Leader of the Pack". The single made the Billboard Hot 100 (reaching #92), and became a cult classic years later from airplay on Dr. Demento's syndicated radio show. It was included on the World's Worst Records compilation and on Rhino's 1984 compilation LP Teenage Tragedies.
- In a 1965 episode of The Lucy Show, "Lucy in the Music World", Lucille Ball tried to appeal to teenagers with a song about a boyfriend whose "surfboard came back by itself." She had been advised that youth today "aren't happy unless they're miserable."
- "Death Cab for Cutie" by the Bonzo Dog Doo-Dah Band (1967), the inspiration for the band of the same name.
- Randy Newman's song "Lucinda", on his 1970 album 12 Songs, concerns a girl who falls asleep on the beach in her graduation gown, and is killed and buried by a beach cleaning machine.
- In John Entwistle's "Roller Skate Kate", from his 1973 album Rigor Mortis Sets In, the heroine is killed while skating in the high-speed lane of the motorway.
- 10cc's 1973 song "Johnny Don't Do It" is a parody of teenage tragedy songs.
- "Pizza Man", a parody of "Leader of the Pack", sung by Alice Playten as part of the National Lampoon Lemmings stage show and subsequent album in 1973.
- Gilda Radner, Jane Curtin, and Laraine Newman recorded a song for season 2 of Saturday Night Live entitled "Chevy, Chevy", a parodic teenage tragedy song presenting Chevy Chase as a teen idol.
- On The Rich Little Show of March 8, 1976, Tom Bosley and "Sweathogs" Lawrence Hilton-Jacobs, Robert Hegyes, and Ron Palillo sang a parody of the genre called "Pizza Death", in which the simple-minded driver of a pizzeria delivery van crashed, affording the by-standers an opportunity for free pizza.
- Aaron Fechter's "Wolf Pack 5" animatronic show in 1978 featured the song "Dragstrip in the Sky", a tribute to the genre involving a girl's boyfriend who is killed during a drag race accident when his car's rear axle breaks. A revised version of the song was performed by Mitzi Mozzarella in Aaron's more well-known animatronic show, The Rock-afire Explosion.
- "My Baby's the Star of a Driver's Ed Movie", a 1983 song by Blotto.
- "The Homecoming Queen's Got a Gun" by comedian and singer Julie Brown. Released nationally in 1984, the song (along with an accompanying video in heavy MTV rotation) was both a parody of the genre, and a satire of valley girl culture.
- "Don't go in the water" a 1990 song by Australian band Ratcat, in which a girl drowns in front of her boyfriend.
- Tom Chapin and Michael Mark wrote a parody of a teenage tragedy song called "The Battle Beast and Barbie" for Chapin's 1994 album So Nice To Come Home. Written in the parodic style of a '60s girl group tragedy ballad, it involves two plastic toys who "met by accident and fell in love", only for Battle Beast to be shot down by "Ken" at the school prom.
- The MST3K treatment of the 1996 film Werewolf included a sketch in which Mike and the bots dressed up as a girl group to sing "Where, O Werewolf", about "Suzy" (Mike) in a doomed relationship with her werewolf boyfriend.
- After the final song on the 2007 Broadway cast album for the 1960s-set musical Hairspray is a hidden track, an upbeat number about the dangers of drunk driving.
- "Road Man" by Smash Mouth, in which a roadie is hit by a train while rushing to get the band's gear to a show.
- Rilo Kiley, with lead singer Jenny Lewis, recorded "Teenage Love Song", a genre parody in which the singer laments being abandoned by her boyfriend after having sex in a motel room.
- In "The Living End" by the Jesus and Mary Chain, a leather-clad biker in love with himself ends up crashing into a tree.

== See also ==
- Murder ballad
- Obituary poetry
- Star-crossed lovers
- Tragedy
