= The Edge (TV series) =

- Genre: Variety; Comedy
- Created by: David Mirkin
- Written by: Julie Brown; Jasper Cole; Charlie Coffey; Ken Keeler; David Mirkin; Charlie Kaufman; Nancy Neufeld Callaway; Steve Tompkins and others
- Directed by: Peter Baldwin; Steve Klayman; David Mirkin; Rob Schiller
- Starring: Julie Brown; Jennifer Aniston; Tom Kenny; Wayne Knight; Carol Rosenthal; James Stephens III; Jill Talley
- Narrated by: Edd Hall
- Theme music composer: Christopher Tyng (pilot); Stephen Graziano (episodes 2–12, 18); Boris Blank; Dieter Meier (original songwriters, episodes 2–12, 18); Steve Hampton (episodes 13–17)
- Opening theme: "Si Señor the Hairy Grill" performed by Stephen Graziano (episodes 2–12, 18)
- Composers: Stephen Graziano; B.C. Smith; Christopher Tyng
- Country of origin: United States
- Original language: English
- No. of seasons: 1
- No. of episodes: 18

Production
- Executive producer: David Mirkin
- Producers: Julie Brown; Charlie Singer
- Running time: 30 mins.
- Production companies: Mirkinvision; TriStar Television

Original release
- Network: Fox
- Release: September 19, 1992 – May 2, 1993

The Edge is an American sketch comedy television series created by David Mirkin that was produced by Mirkinvision and TriStar Television that aired on Fox for a single season from September 19, 1992, to May 2, 1993.

== Synopsis ==
The series features an ensemble cast headed by comedian Julie Brown. The other cast members were Jennifer Aniston, Tom Kenny, Wayne Knight, Carol Rosenthal, James Stephens III, and Jill Talley. Other regulars of the series included Rick Overton, Paul Feig, and Alan Ruck.

The show features sketches that revolve around original characters, such as a gun-toting All-American family and a cowboy known as Cracklin' Crotch. The series would also skewer pop culture. One notable episode spoofed TV sweeps by promising ratings-grabbing events such as a birth, a wedding, and a death.

Similar to other sketch comedy shows, such as The Ben Stiller Show, which premiered at the same time, the show adopted a format in which every episode would feature at least one flagship sketch that would be divided into different segments that would play over the course of a single episode. For example, one episode featured interviews with the four swimsuit models of Illustrated Sports in which each interview segment would play at different points in the episode. Another episode featured a parody of Rescue 911 that showed the fictitious history and origins of the 911 emergency telephone number in a series of segments that were shown throughout the episode.

The series also features a running gag in which the entire cast would get killed off in various ways in each episode before the first sketch. One episode featured the cast getting hit by a bus; another had the set falling apart and crushing them; others involved explosions, decapitations, immolation, hangings, and impalement by arrows; one episode had the troupe being sucked into a vortex. In addition to sketches, Bill Plympton cartoons were used as bumpers between the sketches.

Guest appearances were made on the Illustrated Sports parody by Kim Walker and Shari Shattuck.

== Cast ==
=== Main ===
- Julie Brown
- Jennifer Aniston
- Tom Kenny
- Wayne Knight
- Carol Rosenthal
- James Stephens III
- Jill Talley

=== Supporting ===
- Edd Hall
- Rick Overton
- Alan Ruck
- Paul Feig
- Larry Cedar

=== Special Guest Stars ===
- Kevin Nealon
- Kathy Ireland
- George Wendt

== Recurring segments and characters ==
Segment	Actor	Description
What (_____) is doing RIGHT THIS MINUTE	Edd Hall & various cast members	A sequence where Edd Hall, in voiceover, described what a celebrity, historical figure, politician, character from pop-culture (such as Mister Ed, Oscar the Grouch, ALF or Flipper), inanimate object or fictional person with an odd quirk was doing "RIGHT THIS MINUTE" (for example, "What a man with a nervous twitch who likes to attend auctions is doing RIGHT THIS MINUTE"). This would usually segue into the next sketch.
People Not Connected 2 Reality	Edd Hall & various cast members	Similar to What (____) is doing RIGHT THIS MINUTE, these segments would show a series of characters acting delusional about their situation.
Armed Family	Wayne Knight, Carol Rosenthal, Jennifer Aniston & Tom Kenny	The members of a seemingly typical suburban nuclear family are actually all trigger-happy handgun carriers who are constantly firing their guns brazenly and recklessly at anyone they come into contact with, including each other.
Barb Douglas from Minnesota	Julie Brown	A middle-aged housewife from Minnesota with a wholesome Minnesota Nice personality who clashes with the raunchy and risqué situations she found herself in such as working at a phone sex line or at an escort service.
Charmaine and Feather	Julie Brown & Carol Rosenthal	Two hairdressers, who speak with stereotypical New York accents, are shown getting into wacky predicaments with their customers such as accidentally leaving solution on a customer's scalp for a prolonged period of time resulting in her death. Feather would often attempt to tell an off-putting story or provide an elaborate description with unsavory details and would get interrupted by Charmaine saying the catchphrase, "Feather, don't take me there!"
Shasta and Carla, the Guns N' Roses Groupies	Julie Brown & Jennifer Aniston	Two dimwitted groupies of the band Guns N' Roses are frequently spurned by the band and are looking for ways to win their approval such as writing a song for them or by shipping themselves to Japan inside luggage in order to join them on their tour.
Talk Chat	Tom Kenny & Julie Brown	A talk show host interviews celebrities Madonna and Demi Moore, both played by Brown, who skewers their personalities in an over-the-top fashion.
¡Viva Glamor!	Julie Brown	A Latin-themed talk show hosted by the flamboyant, libidinous and highly excitable Carmen.
Grendela the Troll	Julie Brown	A troll, with an appearance inspired by the troll dolls, is depicted in a series of absurd situations, such as dating a human boy and being pitted against two home invaders à la Home Alone.
Andy the Exterminator	Wayne Knight	An exterminator engages in hi-jinks while making house calls to various customers.
Woody Allen & Mia Farrow	Tom Kenny & Jill Talley	The marriage between Allen and Farrow in light of Allen's relationship with his stepdaughter Soon-Yi Previn is parodied in two sketches, one of which is a parody of the film Misery.

== Production ==
The show was created by David Mirkin and Julie Brown; the two were in a relationship at the time. It was developed for NBC following the failure of the pilot The Julie Show. NBC passed on the show, but it was picked up by Fox. The Edge was canceled at the end of the 1992–93 U.S. television season by Fox.

Music was provided by Steve Hampton (theme song composer), Stephen Graziano, B.C. Smith, and Christopher Tyng among others. Edd Hall provided the show's voiceovers.

== Controversy ==
Producer Aaron Spelling threatened to sue the show over its lampoons of his TV show Beverly Hills 90210. He objected to its "completely tasteless" humor, which included an impersonation of his daughter, an actress on the show, Tori Spelling exclaiming "I can do that because it's Daddy's show." The show's production company TriStar Television refused to apologise, while Mirkin responded: "The thing about these parodies is they don't hurt a show. It's only cross-promotion. The viewers who like the show always come back the next week. What's upsetting to me is it shows absolutely that Mr. Spelling has no sense of humor."

According to the Pittsburgh Post-Gazette, executive producer Mirkin was "forced off the show" due to this negative reaction of Spelling and others. However, in 2012, Mirkin stated that he in fact left the series after refusing to accept a substantially reduced budget. The show's producers, Sony, failed to persuade him to stay, but he returned to the series to produce its final "Best Of" compilation.

== Episodes ==
No.	Title	Directed by	Original release date	Prod. code
1	"Episode 1"	David Mirkin	September 19, 1992	101
2	"Episode 2"	David Mirkin	September 26, 1992	102
3	"Episode 3"	David Mirkin	October 3, 1992	103
4	"Episode 4"	David Mirkin	October 10, 1992	104
5	"Episode 5"	David Mirkin	October 24, 1992	105
6	"Episode 6"	David Mirkin	October 31, 1992	106
7	"Episode 7"	David Mirkin	November 7, 1992	107
8	"Episode 8"	David Mirkin	November 21, 1992	108
9	"Episode 9"	David Mirkin	November 28, 1992	109
10	"Episode 10"	David Mirkin	December 5, 1992	110
11	"Episode 11"	David Mirkin	December 19, 1992	111
12	"Episode 12"	David Mirkin	January 9, 1993	112
13	"Episode 13"	Rob Schiller	February 7, 1993	113
14	"Episode 14"	Rob Schiller	March 7, 1993	114
15	"Episode 15"	Rob Schiller	March 7, 1993	115
16	"Episode 16"	Rob Schiller	March 28, 1993	116
17	"Episode 17"	Steve Klayman	April 11, 1993	117
18	"Episode 18"	David Mirkin	May 2, 1993	118

== Reception ==
Howard Rosenberg of Los Angeles Times found The Edge to be "disappointing" and full of "mostly sophomoric sketches", though he did praise the premiere episode's closing skit noting the series "does save the best for last". Ken Tucker of Entertainment Weekly was more positive in his review of the series, calling it "edgy" and giving the show a B− grade.

Early ratings for the show were described as "respectable" by Variety.
