= The Homecoming Queen's Got a Gun =

Song by Julie Brown
- A-side: "I Like 'Em Big And Stupid"
- Released: November 9, 1983
- Recorded: 1983
- Genre: Doo-wop; synth-pop; novelty
- Label: Bulletz Records
- Songwriters: Julie Brown, Charlie Coffey, Ray Colcord, Terrence E. McNally
- Producer: Julie Brown

"The Homecoming Queen's Got a Gun" is a song by American singer–comedian Julie Brown. It appeared as the B-side to her 1983 single "I Like 'em Big and Stupid". Brown's satire of valley girl culture also parodies 1950s–1960s "teen tragedy" songs.

== Description ==
The song and its music video, directed by Tom Daley, begins as a satire of a 1950s doo-wop song, recounting the homecoming dance in which her best friend, Debbie, is crowned queen. Once that happens, the tone changes to 1980s synthpop as Debbie unexpectedly pulls out a weapon and begins indiscriminately killing classmates and teachers at the parade (the singer, in keeping with the Valley Girl stereotype of being oblivious and self-absorbed, shows remarkable lack of sympathy for the deaths of the entire glee club and the math teacher). In the end, the police fire a warning shot at Debbie, which strikes her behind the ear and fatally wounds her. Debbie's last words to the singer are "I did it for Johnny", leaving the singer puzzled as to who she meant.

== Production ==
The original 2 songs "I Like 'Em Big & Stupid" and "The Homecoming Queen's Got a Gun" were produced & arranged by L.A. based musician/producer Steve Thoma. Recorded in just 2 days @ Kitchen Sync Studios in Hollywood, Michael Hamilton & Steve Thoma-engineers; then mixed @ Alpha Studios, Burbank by Gary Brandt & Steve Thoma. Musicians include: Chuck Berkinshaw-drums; Jeff Steele-bass; Danny Grenier-guitars; Chris Mostert-Saxophones; Nancy Buche', Leslie Livrano, Julie Brown & Charlie Coffey-background vocals; Steve Thoma, all keyboards & Linn drum programming. These 2 songs got plenty of radio airplay, and the video for "Queen" was a hit on MTV.

== Releases ==
The song first appeared as a B-side to Brown's 1983 self-released single "I Like 'em Big and Stupid", and took off after frequent play on The Dr. Demento Show led to radio airplay around the US. It would become what music critic Jonathan Taylor called "one of the most delightfully silly singles and videos of the past few years."

"The Homecoming Queen's Got A Gun" was re-released (along with its A-side) on Brown's 1984 EP Goddess in Progress on Rhino Records (RNEP610). It also appears on the novelty label's subsequent release – the compilation Teenage Tragedies (RNEP611) – packaged with nine other songs, original '50s and '60s "death discs" of the type her song parodies. It was also included in Brown's 1987 album Trapped in the Body of a White Girl, and appears on the 1991 Rhino compilation Dr. Demento 20th Anniversary Collection. A re-recorded dance version appeared as a B-side to Brown's 2005 single "I Want to Be Gay".

In October 2008, Brown released a re-written version, "The Ex-Beauty Queen's Got a Gun," parodying Republican vice presidential candidate Sarah Palin during Palin's bid for election with John McCain. Available digitally only, the low-budget recording has Brown singing new lyrics over a previously released karaoke version of the original song. As such, the prerecorded backing vocals sing words that do not match the new lyrics.

== Reception ==
At least one reviewer cited the song as evidence of a sea change in novelty songs, observing: "The songs got sicker and more nihilistic. In 1960, a pretty girl wore an 'Itsy Bitsy Teenie Weenie Yellow Polka Dot Bikini'; in 1985, a pretty girl in Julie Brown's cult classic "The Homecoming Queen's Got a Gun" grabs a machine gun and does a Rambo on most of the senior class."

The song was ranked No. 488 in the KROQ Flashback 500 of 1988 and No. 324 in the KROQ-FM Flashback 500 of 1996. It was included in a special by the Australian national radio station Triple J on school songs in 2001.

Brown admitted in a July 2000 interview that after the Columbine High School massacre, she no longer felt comfortable performing "Homecoming Queen", even though the circumstances of the song were quite different from the real-life events, and it had been comic at the time of its debut. "I can be very sensitive about whether I am doing something that will hurt people," Brown said. "So you are always drawing the comedy line of what you will or won't do."
