= Jimmy Cross =

American musician (1938–1978)

- Born: 17 November 1938; United States
- Died: 8 October 1978 (aged 39)
- Occupation(s): Singer, radio producer
- Labels: Tollie Records, Red Bird, Chicken, Philips

Jimmy Cross (November 17, 1938 – October 8, 1978), also known as Jimmie Cross, was an American radio producer and singer who attained a minor hit with the novelty song "I Want My Baby Back" in 1965.

== Life and radio career ==
Jimmy Cross was born on November 17, 1938, in Dothan, Alabama, and became the producer of the syndicated radio series Country Concert.

== Musical career ==
Cross' single "I Want My Baby Back" was originally issued on the Tollie Records label and reached #92 on the Billboard Hot 100 in February 1965. A parody of teenage tragedy songs of that period, it has since become a cult classic as a result of frequent airplay on the Dr. Demento radio show.

The singer narrates a traffic crash similar to the one described in J. Frank Wilson's 1961 hit "Last Kiss", which is later revealed to be the same incident depicted in the Shangri-Las' 1964 hit "Leader of the Pack". The singer's girlfriend is fatally dismembered in the accident. After months of grief, he digs up her grave, entering the coffin to sing a final chorus of "I Got My Baby Back".

In 1977, British radio DJ Kenny Everett named "I Want My Baby Back" #1 in his list of the "Bottom 30" songs after a public vote, winning the title of "The World's Worst Record". It was released for the first time in the UK on Everett's compilation album The World's Worst Record Show the following year, and was later included on the 1983 Rhino Records compilation The Rhino Brothers Present the World's Worst Records.

Cross went on to record "The Ballad of James Bong" (Tollie), "Hey Little Girl" (Red Bird Records), and "Super-Duper Man" (Red Bird).

== Death ==
Cross died of a heart attack in Hollywood on October 8, 1978, aged 39. He is buried at Forest Lawn Memorial Park in Glendale, California.
