= Trapped in the Body of a White Girl =

Studio album by Julie Brown
- Released: 1987
- Recorded: 1986–1987
- Genre: Pop; synth-pop; electronic; comedy
- Label: Sire; Warner Bros.
- Producer: Julie Brown; Terrence E. McNally

Julie Brown chronology
Goddess in Progress (1984)	Trapped in the Body of a White Girl (1987)	Smell the Glamour (2010)

Professional ratings
Review scores
Source	Rating
AllMusic	3.5/5 stars

Trapped in the Body of a White Girl is a studio album by American comedian Julie Brown, released in 1987.

Brown independently re-released the CD in 2007 via her own pressing and available through her website. The rights to the album were sold in a larger deal to the Noble Rot label, which re-released it officially in 2010.

Though Brown is a comedian, not all of the songs are strictly comedic in nature. The singles "I Like 'Em Big and Stupid", "Trapped in the Body of a White Girl" and "Girl Fight Tonight!" were released. "Homecoming Queen" was a B-side to "Stupid" and was far more successful and popular, but did not feature on a single of its own. Brown did not release another music recording until 2005.

== Track listing ==
Side one

1. "Trapped in the Body of a White Girl" – 3:58
2. "I Like 'Em Big and Stupid" – 3:49
3. "Shut Up and Kiss Me" – 3:08
4. "Inside Every Girl" – 3:40
5. "Time Slips Away" – 4:14

Side two

6. "Callin' Your Heart" – 3:49
7. "Boys 'R a Drug" – 3:41
8. "Girl Fight Tonight!" – 3:42
9. "Every Boy's Got One" – 3:25
10. "The Homecoming Queen's Got a Gun" – 4:40
