= I Like 'em Big and Stupid =

"I Like 'Em Big and Stupid"

Single by Julie Brown
- Released: November 9, 1983
- Recorded: 1983
- Genre: Pop, comedy
- Label: Bulletz Records
- Songwriters: Julie Brown, Charles Coffey, Terrence McNally
- Producer: Julie Brown

Julie Brown singles chronology
"I Like 'Em Big and Stupid" (1983)	"Trapped in the Body of a White Girl" (1987)

"I Like 'Em Big and Stupid" was the debut single by comedian and singer Julie Brown. It was self-released by Brown in 1983 in 12-inch and 7-inch vinyl record formats. The song is a 1980s-style pop song with comedic lyrics about the protagonist's desire for a handsome, hunky muscle-stud who is not very bright (or as she sings, "Superman with a lobotomy"). The 12-inch version contained an extended dance mix and the B-side on all releases, "The Homecoming Queen's Got a Gun", was played on The Dr. Demento Show, and received airplay on Top 40 and Modern Rock stations around the US in 1984. Both songs appeared that year on Brown's next release, Goddess in Progress.

Brown re-recorded the song for her 1987 album Trapped in the Body of a White Girl, and it was filmed for inclusion in Earth Girls Are Easy, but this sequence was ultimately removed from the movie (the scene is included in the DVD extras) though it is heard playing in the background during a scene in the film. Additionally, Brown performed the song in the stage version of Earth Girls.

The cover of the single is a pastiche of the back cover of Madonna's Like a Virgin record. Brown would go on to be known for making fun of Madonna, particularly in her mockumentary Medusa: Dare to Be Truthful.
