= Earth Girls Are Easy =

1988 film by Julien Temple

- Theatrical release poster
- Directed by: Julien Temple
- Written by: Julie Brown; Charlie Coffey; Terrence E. McNally
- Produced by: Tony Garnett
- Starring: Geena Davis; Jim Carrey; Damon Wayans; Jeff Goldblum; Julie Brown
- Cinematography: Oliver Stapleton
- Edited by: Richard Halsey
- Music by: Nile Rodgers
- Production company: Kestrel Films
- Distributed by: Vestron Pictures (United States); Odyssey Distributors (International)
- Release dates: September 9, 1988 (TIFF); May 12, 1989 (United States)
- Running time: 100 minutes
- Country: United States
- Language: English
- Budget: $10 million (est.)
- Box office: $3.9 million

Earth Girls Are Easy is a 1988 American science fiction musical romantic comedy film that was directed by Julien Temple. The film stars Geena Davis, Jeff Goldblum, Jim Carrey, Damon Wayans, Julie Brown, Charles Rocket and Michael McKean. The plot is based on the song "Earth Girls Are Easy" from Brown's 1984 EP Goddess in Progress.

== Plot ==
In the San Fernando Valley, Valerie Gail works as a manicurist at the Curl Up & Dye salon. Dissatisfied with the lack of sexual interest from her fiancé, Dr. Ted Gallagher, she receives a makeover from her friend and the salon manager, Candy Pink. That night, Valerie sets out to seduce Ted, but instead, he arrives home with Robin, a nurse. Heartbroken and angry, Valerie kicks him out and destroys his belongings.

Meanwhile, three furry aliens—Mac, Zeebo, and Wiploc—from planet Jhazalla are traveling in a spaceship. It has been a long time since they have had female companionship, and they receive a broadcast showing human females. They are titillated by these "hairless", shapely creatures. A fight between Zeebo and Wiploc causes the spaceship to plummet toward Earth, and they crash land into Valerie's swimming pool while she sunbathes. Valerie is frightened at first, but then she invites the aliens into her home. She calls her surf bum friend Woody to come over and drain the pool so the aliens can repair their ship. Despite a language barrier, the aliens prove to be quick learners and absorb American pop culture and language by watching television.

Ted tries to call Valerie and leaves a message informing her that he will return home later that night. Fearing Ted's reaction, Valerie takes Mac, Zeebo, and Wiploc to the salon. Although initially scared, Candy agrees to help the aliens blend into their surroundings. After having their fur shaved off, the aliens turn out to be human-looking and attractive. The group decides to go out and party at a local nightclub, where the aliens' looks, athleticism, and incredibly long tongues soon catch the eyes of every woman in the place. Valerie and Mac begin to fall for each other.

Ted arrives home and, finding Valerie missing, calls the police. She soon arrives with the aliens, claiming she won an MTV contest to spend the weekend with a rock band. Ted angrily demands that the aliens leave, but when two police officers arrive, Valerie tells them that Ted is attacking her guests. As the officers escort Ted away, he calls off the wedding. Despondent, Valerie retreats to her bedroom and Mac goes in to console her. They discover that they are anatomically compatible and have sex.

The next day, the pool is fully drained, and Zeebo and Wiploc are working on their ship when Woody stops by and offers to take them to the beach. They agree, and after accidentally holding up a convenience store, Zeebo and Wiploc are soon driving down a freeway the wrong way, in reverse, with the police in pursuit. Mac discovers his crew mates are in trouble and goes to help, but gets arrested along with Woody in a case of mistaken identity. Valerie smashes the police vehicle to get arrested, too, so she can go with Mac.

The police pursuit ends in a crash, and Zeebo and Wiploc are taken to the emergency room. There, they are examined by Ted, who discovers they have two hearts. While he is envisioning achieving fame and fortune from his discovery, Valerie and Mac elude the police and enter the emergency room disguised as a doctor and a nurse; they manage to convince Ted he is delusional. They then escape back to Valerie's house where work continues on the spaceship. Meanwhile, Valerie and Ted reconcile and plan to elope to Las Vegas immediately.

Mac is heartbroken and prepares the ship for takeoff. Valerie goes to say goodbye to her alien friends, followed by Ted, who discovers the ship. While struggling to keep him from calling the authorities, Valerie realizes that Mac is the one she truly loves. She boards the spaceship and they take off.

== Cast ==
- Geena Davis as Valerie Gail
- Jeff Goldblum as Mac
- Damon Wayans as Zeebo
- Jim Carrey as Wiploc
- Julie Brown as Candy Pink
- Michael McKean as Woody
- Charles Rocket as Dr. Ted Gallagher
- Larry Linville as Dr. Bob
- Rick Overton as Dr. Rick
- Diane Stilwell as Nurse Robin
- Stacey Travis as Tammy
- Angelyne as Gas Girl
- Helen Infield Siff as Mamie
- Nedra Volz as Lana
- Samuel J. Hanson as Alien Number 7

== Production ==
After the release of Julie Brown's 1984 EP Goddess in Progress, Warner Bros. Pictures began writing a musical comedy based on the song "Earth Girls Are Easy", starring Brown. The film was to have a screenplay written by Brown, Terrence E. McNally and Charlie Coffey. The film was originally slated to go into production in 1986, but the studio lost confidence in the project when director Julien Temple's previous film, Absolute Beginners (1986), proved to be a dismal box-office failure. The role of Valerie Gail was offered to some of the era's box-office draws such as Madonna and Molly Ringwald, but when they rejected it, Warner Bros. dropped the project. Several other studios expressed interest in producing the film, but none wanted Temple to direct. Ultimately, French bank Crédit Lyonnais agreed to finance the film with Temple at the helm (if $4 million was shaved off of the film's estimated $14 million budget) and the De Laurentiis Entertainment Group agreed to distribute it.

Principal photography was finally underway in late 1987. Temple brought his own ideas to the project, including peppering the background with then-modern-sounding pop songs, featuring an homage to The Nutty Professor (1963), and using media personality Angelyne in a brief cameo (the director declared her "the patron Saint of Los Angeles"). However, Temple's studious eye for detail caused delays on the set, and according to producer Tony Garnett, "The first cut we had of the picture was a problem." The film underwent more than five months of post-production tinkering, including the removal of numerous scenes and the production number "I Like 'em Big and Stupid" (a different version of the song plays in the club scene; the deleted sequence appears on the DVD extras) and reshoots later commenced (the song "Cause I'm a Blonde" was injected into the film late in production), by which time the De Laurentiis Entertainment Group had filed for bankruptcy.

The finished print of the film had several very positive previews, which captured the interest of potential distributors Nelson Entertainment, New World, MGM/UA, Carolco Pictures, Lorimar Studios and 20th Century Fox, but ultimately Vestron Pictures acquired the distribution rights. The film debuted at the Toronto Festival of Festivals in September 1988 and was slated to be released the following February, but legal entanglements delayed its release until May 1989.

== Reception ==
=== Box office ===
Box office returns were low, with the film earning only a little more than a third of its $10 million production cost.

The film grossed £172,880 in the United Kingdom.

=== Critical response ===
On the review aggregator website Rotten Tomatoes, the film holds an approval rating of 68% based on 38 reviews, with an average rating of 5.6/10. The website's critics consensus reads, "Earth Girls Are Easy is messy, silly, and not particularly bright – qualities it comes by honestly and deliberately." Metacritic, which uses a weighted average, assigned the film a score of 66 out of 100, based on 16 critics, indicating "generally favorable" reviews.

Roger Ebert of The Chicago Sun-Times gave the film 3 out of 4 stars and concluded, "Earth Girls Are Easy is silly and predictable and as permanent as a feather in the wind, but I had fun watching it." Leonard Maltin's Movie Guide called it an "[i]nfectiously goofy musical" and went on to cite "some good laughs" and "an endearing performance by Davis". George Anderson of the Pittsburgh Post-Gazette gushed over the absurdity of the story, and how fun the film was, saying it "is so cheerful about so many stupid things that you cannot, in good conscience, endorse it, but you may be tempted to adopt it." Chris Hicks of the Deseret News criticized the film for being "less a movie than a stretched-out, padded [music] video."

== Accolades ==
Year	Award	Category	Recipient(s)	Result
1990	Fantasporto	Best Film	Julien Temple	Nominated
1990	Golden Raspberry Awards	Worst Supporting Actress	Angelyne	Nominated
1990	Independent Spirit Awards	Best Cinematography	Oliver Stapleton	Nominated

== Soundtrack ==
The accompanying soundtrack album was released on vinyl, cassette and CD by Sire Records on May 9, 1989. Most of the songs on the album are different mixes than were heard in the film, several songs from the film were omitted altogether and Geena Davis' song "The Ground You Walk On" was replaced with a rendition by Jill Jones.

Royalty's song "Baby Gonna Shake" was issued as a single (available in several formats with numerous remix variations) and Hall & Oates' rendition of "Love Train" was released as a single backed with the film's title song, performed by The N.

No.	Title	Writer(s)	Performer	Length
1.	"Love Train"	Kenny Gamble; Leon Huff	Hall & Oates	3:45
2.	"Baby Gonna Shake"	Stephen Bray; Linda Mallah	Royalty	4:24
3.	"Hit Me"	Paul Robb	Information Society	5:08
4.	"The Ground You Walk On"	Billy Steinberg; Tom Kelly	Jill Jones	4:15
5.	"Earth Girls Are Easy"	Julie Brown; Charles Coffey; Terrence McNally; Sterling Smith	The N	3:43
6.	"(Shake That) Cosmic Thing"	Kate Pierson; Cindy Wilson; Fred Schneider; Keith Strickland	The B-52's	3:51
7.	"Route 66" (The Nile Rodgers Mix)	Bobby Troup	Depeche Mode	4:09
8.	"Who Do You Love?"	Ellas McDaniel	The Jesus and Mary Chain	4:04
9.	"Throb"	Stewart Copeland	Stewart Copeland	2:09
10.	"Brand New Girl"	Brown; Coffey; Dennis Poore	Julie Brown	3:42
11.	"'Cause I'm a Blonde"	Brown; Coffey; Poore	Julie Brown	2:15

== Legacy ==
The film served as inspiration for the music video for the 2015 song "Pretty Girls" by American singer Britney Spears and Australian rapper Iggy Azalea.

== Stage show ==
Beginning on September 16, 2001, there were several staged readings/performances of a musical play version of the film. Based on the film's screenplay and written by Charlie Coffey and Michael Herrmann, Brown reprised her role as Candy Pink, Kristin Chenoweth took over the role of Valerie, Marc Kudisch assumed the role of Dr. Ted Gallagher and Hunter Foster was cast as Mac. Although costumes and props were utilized, there were no sets and the actors carried their scripts around the stage—these stagings were merely devised to find investors for the show.

The play did not feature any original songs; the performers sang renditions of 1980s pop songs along with several numbers from the film. The play followed the film's story and scenes pretty closely, but a lot of new dialogue was written, a few characters were omitted, and there were some other slight deviations. Audio and video recordings of the September 30, 2002, staging are circulating, and several video clips from this performance have surfaced on YouTube.

Despite positive reaction, the timing of the initial staging came days after the September 11 attacks and even after subsequent readings, the show never attained the investors needed to become a full-blown production.

=== Cast ===
- Kristin Chenoweth as Valerie Gail
- Julie Brown as Candy Pink
- Marc Kudisch as Dr. Ted Gallagher
- Hunter Foster as Mac
- Deven May as Wiploc
- Lisa Capps as Nurse Robin/Ensemble
- Roxanne Barlow as Security Guard/Ensemble
- Steve Wilson as Security Guard/Ensemble

=== Musical numbers ===
Act I

- "(Shake That) Cosmic Thing" – The B-52's (heard on radio)
- "Earth Girls Are Easy" – The N (heard on radio)
- "Eternal Flame" – Valerie
- "Brand New Girl" – Candy, Valerie & Ensemble
- "(Let's Get) Physical" – Ted and Nurse
- "Heart of Glass" – Valerie
- "California Girls" (partial) – Mac and Wiploc
- "Funkytown" – Ensemble
- "I Like 'em Big and Stupid" – Candy

Act II

- "True Colors" – Mac
- "Atomic" – Valerie
- "Roam" – Entire Cast
- "Just Like Fred Astaire" – Mac & Valerie
- "'Cause I'm a Blonde" – Candy
- "Should Have Known Better" – Ted
- "Moonblind" – Mac and Valerie
- "Scary Kisses" – Valerie, Mac & Cast
