= Endless Sleep =

Single by Jody Reynolds
- B-side: "Tight Capris"
- Released: March 1958
- Recorded: 1957
- Genre: Pop, rockabilly
- Label: Demon FF-1507
- Songwriters: Jody Reynolds, Dolores Nance

"Endless Sleep" is a "teenage tragedy" pop song written and originally recorded by rockabilly singer Jody Reynolds in 1957.

== Background ==
Reynolds wrote the song in 1956, after listening to Elvis Presley's "Heartbreak Hotel", and first performed it soon afterwards at a performance in Yuma, Arizona. The song told the story of a teenager whose girlfriend had gone missing after a row:

The night was black, rain fallin' down
Looked for my baby, she's nowhere around
Traced her footsteps down to the shore
Afraid she's gone for ever more

Although record companies initially rejected the song as too depressing, Reynolds eventually had a demo accepted by Demon Records in Los Angeles, who agreed that Reynolds record it provided that he changed the song's ending so that the protagonist saved the girl from drowning.

I looked at the sea and it seemed to say
“You took your baby from me away"
My heart cried out “She's mine to keep"
I saved my baby from an endless sleep.

The song was recorded with echo-drenched vocals, and with Al Casey and Howard Roberts on guitars. The record label credited the songwriting to Reynolds and the fictitious "Dolores Nance", in order to make it appear to have been written by a 'professional' songwriting team.

== Chart performance ==
Reynolds' recording reached the number 5 position on the U.S. Billboard Hot 100 chart on July 7, 1958, sold over one million copies, and inspired a trend of "teen tragedy" songs. The song was reissued in 1979 reaching number 66 on the UK singles chart. Reynolds' recording also went to number 5 on the Most Played R&B By Jockeys chart. A re-recorded version by Reynolds appears the 1984 Rhino compilation LP Teenage Tragedies.

== Other versions ==
- British act Marty Wilde and His Wildcats covered the song in 1958 and reached #4 on the UK singles chart, becoming their first chart hit.
- Hank Williams, Jr. covered the song in 1964, an early-career release that was his third charting single. It peaked at #46 on the Country chart and #90 on the Billboard Hot 100 chart.
- Marc Bolan performed a glam version on his short-lived eponymous show Marc in 1977 and recorded it as a b-side to ″Sing Me A Song″ in 1981.
- Danny Kortchmar performed the song in duet with Linda Ronstadt for his 1980 album Innuendo.
- American country music duo The Judds recorded a cover in 1984, which was released on their first album, Why Not Me in 1984. It was not released as a single.
- In 1990, English punk/rocker Billy Idol recorded a cover that was true to Reynolds's rockabilly original. It was released on his Platinum record, Charmed Life.
- American singer/songwriter and ex-Creedence Clearwater Revival frontman John Fogerty covered the song as one of the tracks of 1997 album Blue Moon Swamp.
