= Drag City (album) =

Studio album by Jan and Dean
- Released: November 27, 1963
- Studios: Western; United
- Genre: Pop rock
- Length: 30:34
- Label: Liberty
- Producer: Jan Berry

Jan and Dean chronology
Surf City and Other Swingin' Cities (1963)	Drag City (1963)	Dead Man's Curve / The New Girl in School (1964)

Singles from Drag City
- 1. "Drag City / "Schlock Rod (Pt. 1)" Released: November 8, 1963; 2. "Popsicle" Released: May 3, 1966

Professional ratings
Review scores
Source	Rating
AllMusic	2.5/5 stars

Drag City is the fourth studio album by Jan and Dean. It was released by Liberty Records on November 27, 1963.

== Recording and production ==
On September 13, 1963, the tracks "I Gotta Drive" and "Sting Ray" were tracked at Western Recorders. Covers of the Beach Boys' "Shut Down" and "Little Deuce Coupe" were also tracked at Western on September 17, although Jan and Dean's version of the former song was left unreleased. On October 23, "horn and string overdubs" were added to "I Gotta Drive" at United Recording. On November 14, "Dead Man's Curve", "Hot Stocker", "Surf Route 101", and "Drag Strip Girl" were tracked at United Recording.

The recording of "I Gotta Drive", on which Jan Berry sang lead, was also released by the Matadors as a single on Colpix Records in December. Berry's girlfriend Jill Gibson performed the spoken intro on the Matadors' version. The Matadors also contributed backing vocals to the Drag City album. "Drag Strip Girl" was a reworking of "That's All I Want From You". In his 2016 autobiography Surf City: The Jan & Dean Story, Dean Torrence stated that the original title of "Schlock Rod" was "Bean Wagon", and that he and Berry "improvised most of the song".

The mono version of the album was mastered on November 22, 1963. Engineer Lanky Linstrot recalled he and Berry discovering that President John F. Kennedy had been assassinated during the session.

== Release ==
Liberty released Drag City on November 27, 1963 in mono and stereo. The title track, backed with "Schlock Rod (Part One)", was released as a single on November 8, where it peaked at number ten on the Billboard Hot 100. After the album was released, Berry continued further work on "Dead Man's Curve". The second version of the song was released as a single in early 1964, and peaked at number eight. "Popsicle Truck" was retitled "Popsicle" when it was released as a single on May 3, 1966. It was Jan and Dean's last major hit, charting at number 21.

On March 19, 1996, One Way Records released Drag City on CD as a two-fer with the Bel-Aire Pop Orchestra's album Jan & Dean's Pop Symphony No. 1.

== Critical reception ==
Cash Box gave the album a positive review, stating "The boys have been consistent chart-riders and this session should go the same success route. The hot rod sound is catching on just as surfin' did and their handling of these tunes is first rate." In a retrospective review, Bruce Eder of AllMusic described the album as a "made-to-order effort", but praised the work of the ssession musicians involved.

Dean Torrence referred to Drag City as "one of my favorite albums".

== Track listing ==
Side one
No.	Title	Writer(s)	Length
1.	"Drag City"	Jan Berry; Roger Christian; Brian Wilson	2:15
2.	"I Gotta Drive"	Christian; Barry Mann	2:30
3.	"Drag Strip Girl"	Berry; Artie Kornfeld	2:27
4.	"Surfin' Hearse"	Berry; Christian	2:40
5.	"Dead Man's Curve"	Berry; Christian; Kornfeld; Wilson	2:53
6.	"Schlock Rod (Part 1)"	Don Altfeld; Berry; Christian; Dean Torrence	2:37
Total length:			15:22

Side two
No.	Title	Writer(s)	Length
1.	"Schlock Rod (Part 2)"	Berry; Christian; Torrence	2:56
2.	"Popsicle Truck"	Buzz Cason; Bobby Russell	2:40
3.	"Surf Route 101"	Berry; Christian; Wilson	2:06
4.	"Sting Ray"	Bones Howe; Jean Sharp	2:12
5.	"Little Deuce Coupe"	Christian; Wilson	2:09
6.	"Hot Stocker"	Berry; Christian; Kornfeld	3:09
Total length:			15:12 30:34

== Personnel ==
List of known personnel per Mark A. Moore.

- Jan Berry – harmony vocals
- Dean Torrence – harmony vocals

The Matadors

- Tony Minichiello – harmony vocals
- Vic Diaz – harmony vocals
- Manuel Sanchez – harmony vocals

Additional musicians

- Hal Blaine – (2, 3, 5, 9, 10,, 11, 12), contractor (3, 5, 9, 12)
- Russell Bridges – (2, 3, 5, 9, 10, 12), contractor (11)
- Glen Campbell – (2, 3, 5, 9, 10, 11, 12)
- Roy Caton – (2)
- Al DeLory – (2, 3, 5, 9, 10, 11, 12)
- Steve Douglas – (2, 3, 5, 9, 12)
- Jesse Ehrlich – (2)
- Virgil Evans – (2, 3, 5, 9, 12)
- Elliott Fisher – (2)
- David Gates – (2, 10, 11)
- Leonard Malarsky – (2)
- Jay Migliori – (2)
- Alexander Neiman – (2)
- Wilbert Nuttycombe – (2)
- Earl Palmer – (2, 10)
- William Peterson – (2)
- Bill Pitman – (2, 3, 5, 9 10, 11, 12)
- Ray Pohlman – (2, 3, 5, 9, 10,, 11,, 12)
- Sid Sharp – (2)
- Tommy Tedesco – (2, 3, 5, 9 10, 12)
- William Hinshaw – (3, 5, 9, 12)
- Jimmy Bond – (3, 5, 9, 12)
- Tom Scott – (3, 5, 9, 12)
- Billy Strange – (11)
- Jill Gibson – vocals (9)
- Brian Wilson – backing vocals (1,, 5)
- Gary Usher – backing vocals (5)

Unconfirmed personnel

- Brian Wilson – piano (3, 5, 9, 12)

Production

- Jan Berry – arranger, producer
- Ray Pohlman – arranger (2), orchestrator (3, 5, 9, 12)
- Don Kirshner – supervision
- Lou Adler – supervision
- Bones Howe – engineer
- Lanky Linstrot – engineer
- Studio Five – cover design and photography
- C. Kreiger – rear cover album art
- Roger Christian – liner notes

== Charts ==
Chart performance for Drag City
Chart (1964)	Peak position
US Billboard Top LPs	22
US Cashbox Album Charts	17
