= J. Frank Wilson and the Cavaliers =

American band

- Origin: United States
- Labels: Tamara, Josie Records
- Past members: Alton Baird; Lewis Elliott; Roland "Snake" Atkinson; Mike Hodges; Sid Holmes; Ray Smith; J. Frank Wilson; Rob Zeller; Neil Sheckles

J. Frank Wilson and the Cavaliers were an American 1960s group best remembered for their 1964 million-selling song, "Last Kiss".

== Career ==
The Cavaliers formed around 1955 with leader and guitarist Sid Holmes, bassist Lewis Elliott, saxophonist Rob Zeller, drummer Ray Smith, and vocalist Alton Baird. Baird was drafted shortly after the group formed and the band brought in J. Frank Wilson, after his discharge from Goodfellow Air Force Base (San Angelo, Texas) and Sid Holmes's subsequent mental deterioration in 1962.

Sonley Roush became the manager of the group. He brought to them a song originally recorded by Wayne Cochran called "Last Kiss". Duly recorded by the group, it was first released on Le Cam (722) and then on Tamara (761), before it became a hit in June 1964 on Josie Records (Josie 923). It reached the top 10 in October that year, eventually reaching number two on the Billboard Hot 100, sold over one million copies, and was awarded a gold disc.

While driving in Ohio later that year, Roush fell asleep at the wheel, and they collided head-on with another vehicle. Roush was killed and Wilson was injured to the extent that he was on crutches for the American Bandstand performance a short time later. While J. Frank Wilson and the Cavaliers recorded more songs, and "Last Kiss" was subsequently covered successfully by Wednesday and Pearl Jam, the band charted with only one other song, "Hey, Little One", which reached number 85.

Various band member changes ensued as the Cavaliers eventually continued without Wilson. Elliott took over leadership of the group, and James Thomas came in as the new vocalist, while Buddy Croyle filled Holmes' vacancy. Shortly after that, Zeller and Smith left and were replaced by Snake Atkinson and Mike Hodges. In late 1964, Lewis Elliott recruited an Oklahoma guitarist, Dave Erkin, who was an airman on active duty at Goodfellow AFB and who continued with the Cavaliers up to December 31, 1965, when he was transferred to Alaska.

Wilson, with or without the Cavaliers, continued to release records until 1978. Still touring up to that point, Wilson died on October 4, 1991, at the age of 49, from alcoholism and complications from diabetes.

Lewis Elliott (born August 28, 1937) died after a lengthy illness on June 21, 2022, at age 84.
