= Goddess in Progress =

EP by Julie Brown
- Released: 1984
- Genre: Pop, comedy
- Length: 16:34
- Label: Rhino
- Producer: Steve Thomas, Dan Lawson

Julie Brown chronology
Goddess in Progress (1984)	Trapped in the Body of a White Girl (1987)

Goddess in Progress is a 1984 EP (labeled as a "Specially Priced Mini LP") by Julie Brown, released on Rhino Records on 12" vinyl and cassette. The two tracks on side one first appeared on Brown's independently released 1983 single "I Like 'Em Big And Stupid"; and two of the three tracks on side two were later included on the soundtrack of Earth Girls Are Easy, a film starring Brown and Geena Davis and based on the song of the same name.

== Tracks ==
Side One

1. "I Like 'Em Big and Stupid" (Julie Brown, Charlie Coffey, Terrence McNally, Ray Colcord) Stymie Music 2:39
2. "The Homecoming Queen's Got a Gun" (Brown, Coffey, McNally, Colcord) Stymie Music 4:37

Side Two

3. "Will I Make It Through the Eighties?" (Brown, Coffey) Stymie Music 2:20
4. "'Cause I'm a Blonde" (Brown, Coffey, Dennis Poore) Stymie Music 2:14
5. "Earth Girls Are Easy" (Brown, Coffey, McNally, Sterling Smith) Stymie Music/Hedgeapple Music 4:44

=== 2007 re-release ===
In late 2007, Brown purchased the rights to the EP and re-released it on CD format. She included six previously unreleased tracks recorded between 1984 and 1987. The cover art was a slightly altered version of the original.

Track listing:

1. Will I Make It Through the Eighties 2:47
2. ‘Cause I’m a Blonde 2:19
3. I Like 'Em Big and Stupid 2:44
4. The Homecoming Queen's Got a Gun 4:46
5. Earth Girls Are Easy 4:52
6. Too Much Girl 3:28
7. Call Me for a Good Time 3:44
8. Back in the Back Seat 3:20
9. Surf’s Up, So What 1:46
10. Fallin’ (At the Speed of Love) 3:02
11. Kiss & Tell 2:35

== Back cover ==
The back of the album cover is designed to look like a newspaper front page.
