= Dead Man's Curve (song) =

Coordinates: 34°4′37.29″N 118°25′16.41″W

Single by Jan and Dean

from the album Drag City
- B-side: "The New Girl In School"
- Released: December 4, 1963
- Recorded: November 27, 1963
- Genre: Car song; surf pop; teen tragedy
- Length: 2:57
- Label: Liberty
- Songwriters: Jan Berry, Roger Christian, Brian Wilson, Artie Kornfeld
- Producers: Jan Berry for Screen Gems, Inc.

Jan and Dean singles chronology
"Drag City" (1963)	"Dead Man's Curve" (1963)	"The Little Old Lady from Pasadena" (1964)

"Dead Man's Curve" is a song by the American vocal duo Jan and Dean. Released as a single in December 1963, the song details a teen street race gone awry. It reached number eight on the Billboard Hot 100 singles chart and number 39 in Canada. The song was written and composed by Brian Wilson, Artie Kornfeld, Roger Christian, and Jan Berry at Wilson's mother's house in Santa Monica. It was part of the teenage tragedy song phenomenon of that period, and one of the most popular such selections of all time. "Dead Man's Curve" was added to the Grammy Hall of Fame in 2008.

== Premise ==
The singer goes out for a leisurely drive one night in his Corvette Sting Ray, when a driver pulls up alongside in his Jaguar XKE and challenges him to a drag race. According to the song, the race starts at Sunset and Vine, traveling westbound on West Sunset Blvd., passing North La Brea Ave., North Crescent Heights Blvd., and North Doheny Dr. The original Schwab's Pharmacy was located just east of Crescent Heights on Sunset. The North Whittier Drive curve, a nearly 90° right turn traveling west on Sunset Boulevard just past North Whittier Drive, may have been the "dead man's curve" in the song, but there is debate on the actual location of the curve. Coincidentally, Jan and Dean's Jan Berry would himself later be involved in a near-fatal incident in 1966, when he crashed his own Sting Ray into a parked truck on North Whittier Drive near (though not on) Dead Man's Curve.

The song ends with the singer relating his last memories of the ill-fated race to a doctor. Sound effects of screeching tires and crashing are also heard in the song. Deadman's Curve was used as the title for the 1978 biographical nationally televised movie about Jan and Dean, starring Richard Hatch and Bruce Davison respectively portraying Berry and Torrence.

== Versions ==
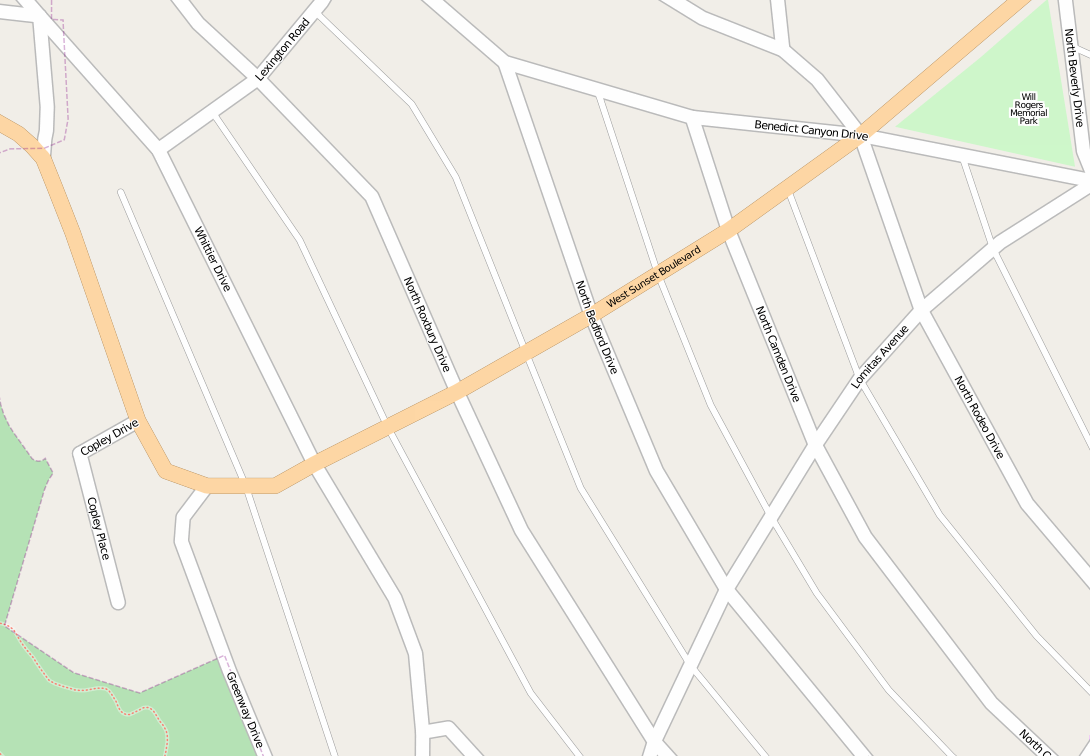
Overhead map view of Dead Man's Curve, an almost ninety-degree right turn traveling west on Sunset Boulevard just past North Whittier Drive near 9901 Sunset Blvd, Beverly Hills, CA 90210

Three versions of "Dead Man's Curve" were released:

- Version #1: Original version from the 1963 Drag City album
- Version #2: Single "hit" version with added horns, strings, additional backing vocals, and sounds of a car skidding and crashing; from the 1964 Dead Man's Curve/The New Girl In School LP
- Version #3: An earlier rejected studio mix from the 1966 Filet of Soul album.

Live versions appear on the 1965 Command Performance, 1971 Anthology, and 2017 Filet of Soul Redux albums.

There are a few minor lyrical differences between versions #1 and 3 and version #2 listed above:

- Versions #1 & 3 – "my frenched tail lights", "the strip was deserted", and "pulled her out and there I was"
- Version #2 – "my six tail lights", "the street was deserted", and "pulled her out and there we were"

There are two basic versions:

Version one: Lead and backing vocals: Jan Berry Background vocals: Jan Berry, Brian Wilson, Gary Usher. Released: on Drag City LP, Liberty LST 7339, Jan and Dean Jan. 6, 1964 Side one, cut five – 3:01

Also on Filet of Soul LP, Liberty LST 7441, Jan and Dean, April 25, 1966, Side two, cut three – 3:01

Version two: Jan Berry, Roger Christian, Artie Kornfeld, Brian Wilson Jan Berry: Lead and backing vocals. Dean Torrence: Backing vocals Released February 17, 1964 Liberty 55672 45 RPM (B-side: "New Girl in School") – 2:28 (2:21 listing on actual disk—Wiki says 2:27) Released May 4, 1964 "Dead Man's Curve"/"The New Girl in School" LP Liberty LST 7361, Jan and Dean Side one, cut one – 2:28 Also re-released on several compilations (the 1984 Rhino LP Teenage Tragedies lists the song as a "re-recorded version"), anthologies, and 45 RPM records (some timed 2:39)

At least one version of the song features The Honeys on backing vocals.

== Cover versions ==
The song was covered by The Carpenters as part of their oldies sequence on their album Now & Then.

The B-side "The New Girl In School" was covered by Alex Chilton on his 1995 album, A Man Called Destruction.

The song was covered by the Belljars, whose version plays over the closing credits of the 1998 film, The Curve AKA Dead Man's Curve.

This song has also been covered by Cleveland proto-punk band electric eels, Blink-182, and Canadian musician Nash the Slash.
