= Tell Laura I Love Her =

American teenage tragedy song

Single by Ray Peterson
- B-side: "Wedding Day"
- Released: 1960
- Genre: Pop
- Length: 2:50
- Label: RCA Victor
- Songwriters: Jeff Barry; Ben Raleigh
- Producer: Hugo & Luigi

Ray Peterson singles chronology
"Goodnight My Love (Pleasant Dreams)" (1959)	"Tell Laura I Love Her" (1960)	"Answer Me" (1960)

"Tell Laura I Love Her"

Single by Ricky Valance
- B-side: "Once Upon a Time"
- Released: 1960
- Genre: Pop
- Label: Columbia/EMI
- Songwriters: Jeff Barry, Ben Raleigh
- Producer: Frank Barber

"Tell Laura I Love Her" is a teenage tragedy song written by Jeff Barry and Ben Raleigh. It was a US top ten popular music hit for singer Ray Peterson in 1960 on RCA Victor Records, reaching No. 7 on the Billboard Hot 100 chart. Later that same year, it was recorded and released by Ricky Valance in the United Kingdom, where it went to the No. 1 spot on the UK singles chart. The song has been a hit in 14 countries, and has sold over seven million copies.

== Content ==
The song tells the tragic story from a witness' perspective of a young man named Tommy who is in love with Laura and wants to marry her, so he enters a stock car race, despite being the youngest and most inexperienced driver, hoping to win and use the prize money to buy Laura a wedding ring. The second verse tells how his car overturns and bursts into flames, although nobody knows what had happened. Tommy is fatally injured and his last words are "Tell Laura I love her... My love for her will never die". In the final verse, Laura prays inside the chapel, where a church organ is heard, and where she can still hear Tommy's voice intoning the title one more time, before it fades out.

== Recording history ==
The lyrics of "Tell Laura I Love Her" originally concerned a rodeo, not an automobile race, as composer Jeff Barry was an aficionado of cowboy culture. However, at RCA's instigation, Barry rewrote the song, in order to more closely resemble the No. 1 hit "Teen Angel". The personnel on the original recording included Al Chernet, Charles Macy, and Sebastian Mure on guitars; Lloyd Trotman on bass; Andrew Ackers on organ; Bob Burns on sax; and Bunny Shawker on drums. Decca Records in England decided not to release Ray Peterson's 1960 recording on the grounds that it was "too tasteless and vulgar" and destroyed about twenty-five thousand copies that had already been pressed. A cover by Ricky Valance, released by EMI on the Columbia label, was No. 1 on the UK Singles Chart for three weeks. Valance's version was initially banned by the BBC; it was considered to be in "bad taste" and expressed concern for copycat activity.

The Peterson single was re-released in 1962, following the success of Valance's recording.

In 1967, the song was covered by Italian strong-voiced singer Michele. Unusually for covers released in Italy in the Sixties, Mogol's lyrics were quite faithful to the original, although Tommy was renamed Tony and recast as a pop singer who scores a hit with a song he wrote for Laura. However, he meets the same fate as the original Tommy in a car accident. In Michele's final verse, Tony's record plays on a record player in Laura's home. Michele's recording was a local hit.

== Chart history ==
=== Weekly charts ===
Chart (1960)	Peak position
Australia	7
Canada (CHUM Hit Parade)	4
New Zealand (Lever Hit Parade)	3
U.S. Billboard Hot 100	7
U.S. Cash Box Top 100	5

Ricky Valance

Chart (1960)	Peak position
UK Singles (Official Charts)	1

Johnny T. Angel

Chart (1974)	Peak position
Canada Top Singles (RPM)	79
U.S. Billboard Hot 100	94
U.S. Cash Box Top 100	80

=== Year-end charts ===
Chart (1960)	Rank
U.S. Billboard Hot 100	67

== Other versions ==
In the U.S. a recording by Johnny T. Angel (a.k.a. Bill Gilliland) on Bell Records peaked at No. 94 on June 22, 1974.

In 1973, Dutch singer Albert West released his 7" version which reached No. 8 on the Dutch Top 40 and No. 1 in Austria.

In 1973, New Zealand band Creation released a rendering which peaked at No. 3 on the New Zealand charts and at No. 20 in the Australian charts the following year.

== Answer song versions ==
An answer song, "Tell Tommy I Miss Him" was released by Marilyn Michaels in 1960. It was originally released by RCA Victor Records as a single and is included on the 2007 compilation album The Answer to Everything - Girl Answer Songs of the '60's. In 1961, country singer Skeeter Davis released the same song on her album Here's the Answer. British singer Laura Lee with orchestra directed by Johnny Keating also recorded a version, released by Triumph Records as a single in the UK in August 1960.
