= Edd Hall =

American television personality

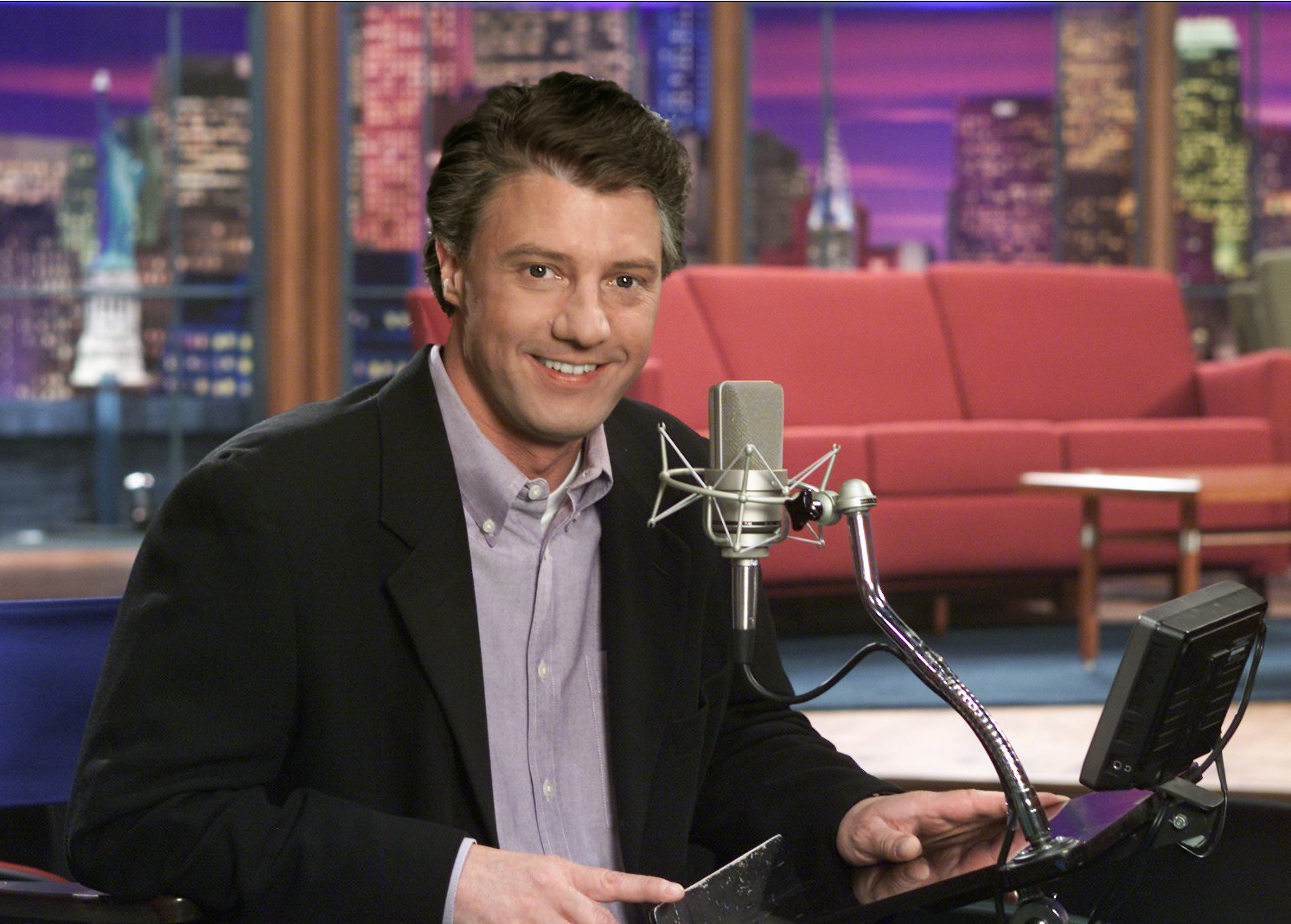
- Hall in 2004
- Born: December 7, 1958 (age 67); Boston, Massachusetts, U.S.
- Occupations: Announcer; actor
- Years active: 1980–present

Edd Hall (born December 7, 1958) is an American television personality and announcer. He was Jay Leno's announcer on The Tonight Show from 1992 to 2004, replacing Tonight Show announcer Ed McMahon after Johnny Carson's retirement. Hall introduced himself by saying, "...And me, I'm Edd Hall." He left the show in October 2004.

== Early career ==
Hall was born in Boston, Massachusetts. Best known as Jay Leno's announcer on The Tonight Show with Jay Leno for 12 years, Hall started in show business at an early age. As a child and teenager, he worked as a magician, clown, fire-eater, and radio announcer. Hall's first network TV job was for Saturday Night Live as an NBC page in January 1979. He went on to work in NBC's Guest Relations Department. He made his first network TV appearance performing an impression of Tom Snyder on The Tomorrow Show in March 1980 as part of the program's "NBC Talent Show" special, after being encouraged to audition by Robert Morton who was Snyder's talent coordinator.

In June 1980, Hall began working as a production assistant for The David Letterman Show, David Letterman's short-lived morning show on NBC, where Morton was a segment producer. In 1982, he became Letterman's visuals producer on Late Night with David Letterman. He remained with Letterman until 1990, often appearing in or lending his voice to comedy sketches on the show. Soon after leaving Letterman in 1990, Hall moved to Los Angeles where he designed the Worldwide Pants logo and animation for Letterman's company. He also wrote an episode of and performed voiceovers for Chris Elliott's show, Get A Life in 1990 and 1991. Some of his other pre-Tonight Show credits include appearances and voiceovers on such TV shows as Saturday Night Live, Married... with Children, Murphy Brown, and Blossom.

== The Tonight Show with Jay Leno ==
Unlike his predecessors on The Tonight Show (i.e., McMahon with Carson, and Hugh Downs with Jack Paar), Hall did not serve as the only sidekick for Jay Leno during his time on Leno's incarnation of The Tonight Show. Hall did, however, appear in hundreds of sketches during his 12-year tenure. He often played the "stooge" to host Leno. Some of his most memorable sketches included vehicles running him over in the studio parking lot, getting "attacked" by actors in large animal costumes, or Leno's discovering Hall "missing" from the studio and after searching for him eventually finding Edd in some ridiculous place or situation.

== After The Tonight Show ==
Soon after leaving The Tonight Show in 2004, Hall appeared as himself in the movie Comic Book: The Movie, directed by Mark Hamill.

During the 2007–2008 TV season, Hall was the announcer for the TV game show Merv Griffin's Crosswords.

Some of his other credits include The Young and the Restless, Sullivan & Son and Kim Possible, among others. He has done voiceover work for commercials for Volkswagen, Google, Alzheimer's Association, Burger King, Old Navy, Buick, Panda Express, and Mazda. In 2013, he was the tournament announcer and narrator of the Netflix documentary The Short Game. In 2015, Hall played a baseball announcer on the NBC series Crowded. From 2016 to 2018, Hall continued to voice commercials on radio and TV as well as a number of TV shows, including episodes of The Thundermans on Nickelodeon, Days of Our Lives on NBC, and Behind the Mask on Hulu.

Some of his recent work includes the voice of Harry, a hardboiled egg/cop in the award winning 2022 animated short, "Hardboiled". (Tribecca Film Festival, WInner - 2022 Hollywood ShortsFest and Winner - 2022 Toronto Shorts International Film Festival.)

In 2023, Edd appeared as himself (voiceover) on an episode of Comedy Central's "Stephen Colbert Presents Tooning Out the News".

Hall has done some theatre since leaving The Tonight Show. He has played Ebenezer Scrooge in A Christmas Carol every year since 2007 at the Thousand Oaks Civic Arts Plaza and played the title role in the 2005 Cabrillo Music Theatre production of The Wizard of Oz. In 2006, he reprised the role of the Wizard for the Starlight Theatre in San Diego.

== Notes ==
Media offices
Preceded by Ed McMahon	The Tonight Show announcer 1992–2004	Succeeded by John Melendez
