= Ray Peterson =

American singer (1935–2005)

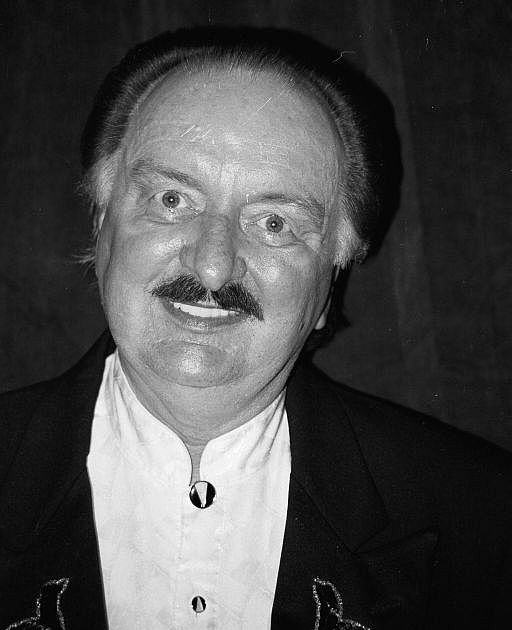
- Peterson in 1998

Background information
- Birth name: Ray T. Peterson
- Born: April 23, 1935; Denton, Texas, U.S.
- Died: January 25, 2005 (aged 69); Smyrna, Tennessee, U.S.
- Genres: Traditional pop, country, rock and roll, rockabilly
- Occupation: Singer
- Instrument: Vocals
- Years active: 1958–2004
- Labels: RCA Victor, Dunes Records

Ray Peterson (April 23, 1935 – January 25, 2005) was an American pop singer who is best remembered for singing "Tell Laura I Love Her". He also scored numerous other hits, including "Corrine, Corrina" and "The Wonder of You".

== Life and career ==
Ray T. Peterson was born in Denton, Texas on April 23, 1935. At the time of his death, sources gave 1939 as his year of birth. As a boy he had polio. Having a four-octave singing voice, Peterson moved to Los Angeles, California, where he was signed to a recording contract with RCA Victor in 1958. He recorded several songs that were minor hits until "The Wonder of You" made it into the Top 40 of the Billboard Hot 100 chart on June 15, 1959. The song also did well in Australia, stopping at No. 9 on its chart. The song would later be recorded by Elvis Presley, with whom Peterson became friends. Peterson scored a Top 10 hit with the teenage tragedy song, "Tell Laura I Love Her". In the UK, Decca Records made the decision not to release the latter recording on the grounds that it was "too tasteless and vulgar," and destroyed about twenty thousand copies that had already been pressed. A cover version by Ricky Valance, released by EMI on the Columbia label, was Number One on the UK Singles Chart for three weeks.

In 1960, Peterson created his own record label with his manager Stan Shulman, called Dunes Records, and enlisted the help of record producer Phil Spector with "Corrine, Corrina". Peterson's dramatic ballad, "I Could Have Loved You So Well", written by Barry Mann and Gerry Goffin and produced by Spector, only reached No. 57 on the U.S. chart. He then tried another death disc, "Give Us Your Blessing", but this time the record only made No. 70 in the Hot-100. (The later song was covered by the Shangri-Las five years later and became a Top 30 hit.)

His last charting US-Top-30 hit was "Missing You". By the mid-1960s he had become something of a phenomenon on the west coast of the United States, appearing live in numerous concerts with Keith Allison.

His performances at the Sacramento Memorial Auditorium, produced by Fred Vail, beginning in 1963 helped fuel a revival of "The Wonder of You", as well as launching his new relationship with MGM Records, an alliance that produced two albums: The Very Best of Ray Peterson which featured most of the Dunes singles, and The Other Side of Ray Peterson, which included many of his nightclub songs. He later moved to Nashville, Tennessee, and by the 1970s when the hit records stopped coming, Peterson became a Baptist Church minister and occasionally played the classic hits music circuit. In 1981 he released a Christian folk rock album called Highest Flight, which was also released as My Father's Place.

Peterson was inducted into the Rockabilly Hall of Fame.

Peterson died of colon cancer on January 25, 2005, in Smyrna, Tennessee, aged 69. He left a widow, four sons, and three daughters. For publicity reasons, he had shaved four years off his age, leading many sources to list his age as 65. He was interred in the Roselawn Memorial Gardens cemetery in Murfreesboro, Tennessee.

== Discography ==
=== Singles ===
Year	Single	Chart Positions					Label
Year	Single	US	US AC	UK	AU	CAN	Label
1958	"Shirley Purley"	-	-	-	-	33	RCA Victor
1959	"The Wonder of You"	25	-	23	9	-	RCA Victor
1959	"Goodnight My Love (Pleasant Dreams)"	64	-	-	63	-	RCA Victor
1959	"Come and Get It"	-	-	-	96	-	RCA Victor
1960	"What Do You Want To Make Those Eyes At Me For?"	104	-	-	-	-	RCA Victor
1960	"Tell Laura I Love Her"	7	-	-	7	4	RCA Victor
1960	"Answer Me"	-	-	47	-	-	RCA Victor
1960	"Corinna, Corinna" ("Corrine, Corrina" in UK)	9	-	41	10	3	Dunes
1961	"Sweet Little Kathy"	100	-	-	-	-	Dunes
1961	"Missing You"	29	7	-	16^{[A]}	6	Dunes
1961	"I Could Have Loved You so Well"	57	-	-	35	-	Dunes
1963	"Give Us Your Blessing"	70	-	-	-	-	Dunes
1964	"The Wonder of You"	70	--	-	-	23	Dunes
1965	"Across The Street (Is a Million Miles Away)"	106	-	-	16	-	M.G.M
1970	"Oklahoma City Times"	111	-	-	-	-	UNI

- A Charted as a double A-side in Australia, backed with "You Thrill Me".

== See also ==
- List of San Antonio, Texas people
- List of poliomyelitis survivors
