= Wayne Cochran =

American singer (1939–2017)

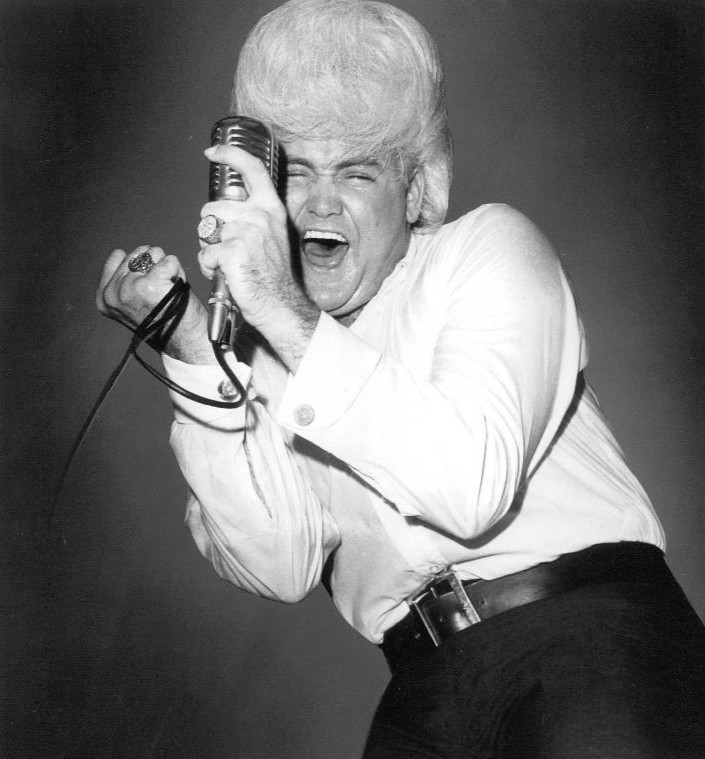
- Cochran in 1969

Background information
- Also known as: White Knight of Soul
- Born: Talvin Wayne Cochran; May 10, 1939; Thomaston, Georgia, U.S.
- Died: November 21, 2017 (aged 78) Miramar, Florida, U.S.
- Genres: R&B; blue-eyed soul; rock and roll
- Occupations: Musician, songwriter, record producer, preacher
- Instrument: Vocals
- Labels: Chess Records, King Records, Epic Records, Raven Records
- Formerly of: Wayne Cochran and the C.C. Riders, Jaco Pastorius
- Website: Official website of Wayne Cochran & The C.C. Riders

Talvin Wayne Cochran (May 10, 1939 – November 21, 2017) was an American singer, known for his outlandish outfits and platinum blond pompadour hairstyle. He was sometimes referred to as The White Knight of Soul. Cochran is best known today for writing the song "Last Kiss", which he performed with the C.C. Riders.

== Biography ==
Talvin Wayne Cochran was born on May 10, 1939, in Thomaston, Georgia, to Talvin A. Cochran, a cotton mill worker, and the former Mini Lee Starley, who came from a farming family.

Influenced by the country and rhythm and blues music he heard on the radio, Cochran fronted his first band - a group called the Rockin' Capris - as a teenager, and eventually left high school to pursue music as a full-time career. He moved to Macon, Georgia, where he befriended the soul singer Otis Redding (playing bass guitar on Redding's early recording of "Shout Bamalama" and its B-side "Fat Girl") and recorded his first single, "The Coo", attracting the attention of King Records, which signed him to a record deal. Cochran became close friends with King labelmate James Brown, whose stage show and road band influenced his own performing style and inspired him to assemble his own soul revue, the C.C. Riders, which occasionally featured as many as 14 musicians plus two female backing vocalists, the Sheer Delights.

Although his single recordings for King (including "Goin' Back to Miami", a song which became a signature tune for the singer) were not commercially successful beyond local markets in the south, Cochran's energetic performances, rigorous touring schedule and appearances on television talk shows, as well as The Jackie Gleason Show helped to make the C.C. Riders a popular attraction. In the mid-1960s, Cochran made Las Vegas his base of operations and played residencies at several hotels, casinos and theatres. During this time, he met and befriended Elvis Presley, from whom he borrowed elements for his own Las Vegas period, adopting jump suits similar to Presley's wardrobe.

Cochran recorded an album for Chess Records titled Wayne Cochran! in 1967, which featured the blue-eyed soul and rhythm and blues style he had perfected on the road with his revue, but backed by session musicians for most of the cuts instead of his touring band. This was followed by a return to King and two further LPs, Alive & Well & Living... In a Bitch of a World and the instrumental High & Ridin', both in 1970. These albums saw the C.C. Riders' guitarist and musical director Charles Brent take an important creative role, and featured a jazz-influenced sound comparable to the Chicago Transit Authority or Blood, Sweat & Tears. Cochran also recorded a "live" album (actually a "live in the studio" record) for King sometime between 1967 and 1969, but not released until 2014 and included in an Ace Records compilation Goin' Back to Miami: The Soul Sides 1965-1970.

Cochran recorded a final album, titled Cochran, for Epic Records in 1972, then toured and made television appearances. He retired from music to become an evangelist minister in Miami, Florida. He died on November 21, 2017, in Miramar, Florida, from cancer at the age of 78.

== Legacy ==
Cochran is best known today for writing the song "Last Kiss", which he performed with the C.C. Riders. Although it was not a success for him, contemporary covers by J. Frank Wilson and the Cavaliers in 1964, Wednesday in 1974, and a much later take by Pearl Jam became hits. It was the best-known hit of the Venezuelan musical group Los 007, formed in Caracas in 1965, that covered the song in Spanish, and spent 20 consecutive weeks in first place on the Venezuelan music charts in 1966. In Mexico, Polo and The Americans covered the song in Spanish. Cochran and his revue also influenced Dan Aykroyd and John Belushi's Blues Brothers musical venture; Cochran is referenced in the 1980 film The Blues Brothers and a cover of his song "Going Back to Miami" is featured on the live album Made in America.

Cochran appeared and sang in the 1970 movie C.C. and Company as himself. The movie trailer, featuring a scene with Cochran and his band The C.C.Riders performing the song "I Can't Turn You Loose", was later used in the 2019 Quentin Tarantino movie Once Upon a Time in Hollywood.

== Discography ==
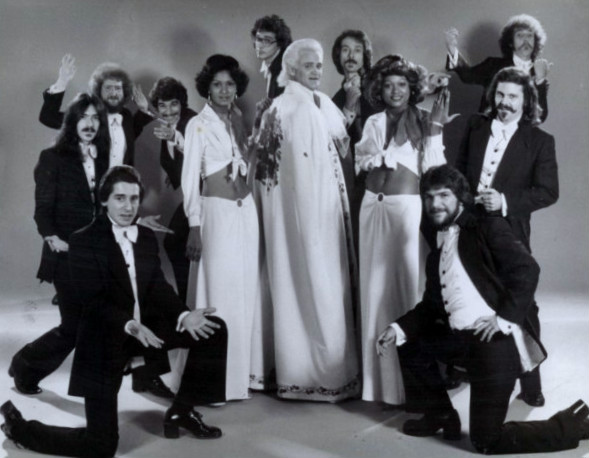
Cochran (in white cape) with the C.C Riders (male backup group) and the Sheer Delights (female backup group), 1977.

=== Albums ===
- Wayne Cochran! (Chess, 1967; reissue: Sundazed, 2014) #167 Billboard 200 Albums
- Alive & Well and Living In...A Bitch of a World (King, 1970)
- High and Ridin' (Bethlehem, 1970)
- Cochran (Epic, 1972)

==== Compilations ====
- Get Down With It! The White Knight of Soul 1959–72 (Raven, 2005)
- Love Strikes Again (Jukebox Entertainment, 2010)
- Goin' Back to Miami: The Soul Sides 1965–1970 (Ace, 2014)

=== Singles ===
| Year | Title | US BB | Label |
|---|---|---|---|
| 1959 | "The Coo" | – | Scottie |
| 1961 | "Last Kiss" | – | Gala |
| 1962 | "Cindy Marie" | – | Aire |
| 1965 | "Harlem Shuffle" | 127 | Mercury |
| 1966 | "Goin' Back to Miami" | – | Mercury |
| 1967 | "Some-A' Your Sweet Love" | – | Chess |
