= J. Frank Wilson =

American singer

- Born: John Frank Wilson; December 11, 1941; Lufkin, Texas, U.S.
- Died: October 4, 1991 (aged 49) Lufkin, Texas, U.S.
- Genres: Rock and roll, R&B
- Occupation: Singer
- Instrument: Vocals
- Years active: 1960s–1991
- Label: Various

John Frank Wilson (December 11, 1941 – October 4, 1991) was an American singer, the lead vocalist of J. Frank Wilson and the Cavaliers. He was inducted into the West Texas Music Hall Of Fame.

== Early life ==
Born in Lufkin, Texas, the son of a railroad engineer. He graduated from the local highschool in 1960 and joined the airforce.

== Career ==
Wilson joined the Cavaliers after his discharge from Goodfellow Air Force Base in San Angelo, Texas, in 1962. The band has formed in 1955 and with Wilson they moved to Memphis for two years before returning to Texas.

The Cavaliers' first chart hit was "Last Kiss", a song written by Wayne Cochran, who had based the song on a car accident in Barnesville, Georgia, near where he lived. The song, while only garnering minor success for Wayne Cochran and the C.C. Riders, found major success for the Cavaliers. "Last Kiss" became a hit in June 1964, it reached the top 10 in October of that year, eventually reaching number two on the Billboard Hot 100. It sold over one million copies, and was awarded a gold disc. In Canada it also reached number two.

In October 1964, the British music magazine NME reported that Wilson had himself been involved in an auto accident near Lima, Ohio, in which his 27-year-old record producer, Sonley Roush, was killed, and Wilson was seriously injured.

While J. Frank Wilson and the Cavaliers recorded several other songs, and "Last Kiss" was subsequently covered successfully by Wednesday and Pearl Jam, the band charted with only one other song, "Hey, Little One", which reached number 85, and number '42' in Canada.

Wilson's solo song "Six Boys" reached number 25 in Canada in February 1965.

Wilson continued to release records until 1970 after which he left the music business and returned to Lufkin.

Wilson died on October 4, 1991, at the age of 49, from alcoholism and complications from diabetes.
