= Jody Reynolds =

American rockabilly singer-songwriter and guitarist (1932–2008)

- Reynolds, ca. 1958

Background information
- Born: Ralph Joseph Reynolds; December 3, 1932; Denver, Colorado, U.S.
- Died: November 7, 2008 (aged 75) Palm Desert, California, U.S.
- Genres: Rockabilly; rock and roll
- Occupations: Singer, songwriter, guitarist
- Instruments: Guitar, vocals
- Years active: 1954–1978
- Labels: Demon, London
- Formerly of: The Storms

Ralph Joseph "Jody" Reynolds (December 3, 1932 – November 7, 2008) was an American rock and roll singer, guitarist, and songwriter whose song "Endless Sleep" was a major U.S. top-ten hit in the summer of 1958. His follow-up single, "Fire of Love", peaked at just No. 66 on the Billboard chart, but the song went on to become a blues-punk proto punk-garage rock classic after being covered by the MC5 and the Gun Club : the song “The Fire of Love” appears on the MC5’s “Live in Saginaw” album and was recorded by punk blues-punk rock band The Gun Club for their Miami (The Gun Club album), released in 1982 on Animal Records.

Reynolds was a regular on the "oldies" circuit and a successful businessman in the U.S. Southwest. Beginning in the 1980s several compilations of his music were issued in the U.S. and Europe, and he enjoyed modest acclaim as a pioneer of rockabilly music.

In 1999, Reynolds was honored with both a Golden Palm Star on the Palm Springs Walk of Stars in Palm Springs, California, and induction into the Rockabilly Hall of Fame.

== Life and career ==
Ralph Joseph Reynolds was born in Denver, Colorado, United States, and was raised in the small town of Shady Grove, Oklahoma. Inspired by Western Swing and artists such as Bob Wills, Hank Thompson, and Eddy Arnold, who he heard on the radio, Reynolds took up guitar at age 14. He began playing rockabilly in Texas in the mid-1950s after hearing performers such as Elvis Presley, Carl Perkins, and Roy Orbison.

While performing in San Diego, California, Reynolds met music publisher Herb Montei. Montei rejected several songs offered by Reynolds, but after hearing his composition "Endless Sleep", got him signed to Demon Records and began managing him.

Inspired by the haunting sound of Elvis Presley's "Heartbreak Hotel", Reynolds wrote "Endless Sleep" while in Yuma, Arizona for a gig, and played it onstage the same night. Though a proficient guitarist himself, the studio recording of the song featured Al Casey and Howard Roberts on guitars. It had been written solely by Reynolds, but Demon Records credited it to Reynolds and the fictitious "Dolores Nance", to make it appear to have been written by a 'professional' songwriting team. With spooky, reverb-laden vocals, "Endless Sleep" tells the story of a young man desperately searching for his girlfriend, who, after an argument, has flung herself into the ocean. The label persuaded a reluctant Reynolds to change the lyrics to give the song a happy ending.

The song reached the No. 5 position on the U.S. Billboard Hot 100 chart on July 7, 1958, sold over one million copies, and inspired a trend of "teen tragedy" songs. Reynolds performed on American Bandstand and other TV shows, and was featured on concert tours organized by the disc jockey/promoter Alan Freed. "Endless Sleep" would later be covered by the Judds, John Fogerty, Nick Lowe and Billy Idol; Marty Wilde had a major hit with it in the UK, and Hank Williams, Jr.'s version was a modest country music chart success.

Reynolds' self-penned follow up single, "Fire of Love", became a rock and roll classic years later, after being revived by the MC5 and the Gun Club, but only reached No. 66 on the Billboard chart when released in August 1958, and was his last song to reach the Billboard Hot 100. Unlike "Endless Sleep, "Fire of Love" is credited as being co-written by Reynolds, and his first wife, Sonja Sturdivant.

Reynolds recorded several more singles, both with Demon and other labels, including duets with Bobbie Gentry, two songs written by Marty Cooper and Lee Hazlewood, and two hot instrumentals released under the name "The Storms" (Reynolds' backing band). By the mid-1960s he had settled in Palm Springs, where he focused on raising a family and working as a realtor; however, he retained his lifelong love of music, writing and recording songs in a small home studio, occasionally performing in "oldies" shows, and opening a music store.

Col. Tom Parker, Elvis Presley's manager, signed Reynolds to his Boxcar Publishing Co., thinking Presley might be interested in some of his songs, though Presley died in 1977 before recording any of them. Reynolds included one of the songs he had written for Presley, "Yesterday and Today", on a 1978 album.

Starting in the late 1970s, "Endless Sleep" and other of Reynolds' songs were re-released in Europe and America; the rockabilly revival beginning in the mid-1970s (Hank Mizell's "Jungle Rock" hit the UK top ten in 1976) saw a further increase of interest in his music.

Reynolds was married to his wife of 47 years, Judy. They were parents to two daughters and a son. Reynolds died of liver cancer on November 7, 2008, in Palm Desert, California, at age 75.

== Recordings ==
- Demon Records
  - 1507 "Endless Sleep" / "Tight Capris" – March 1958
  - 1509 "Fire of Love" / "Daisy Mae" – July 1958
  - 1511 "Closin' In" / "Elope With Me" – November 1958
  - 1515 "Golden Idol" / "Beaulah Lee" – March 1959
  - 1519 "The Storm" / "Please Remember Me" – August 1959
  - 1523 "The Whipping Post" / "I Wanna Be With You Tonight" – April 1960
  - 1524 "Stone Cold" / "(The Girl With The) Raven Hair" – June 1960
- Sundown Records
  - 114 "Thunder" / "Tarantula" – January 1959
- Indigo Records
  - 127 "Thunder" / "Tarantula" – August 1961
- Emmy Records
  - 1011 "Dusty Skies" / "Brandy" 1962
- Smash Records
  - 1810 "Don't Jump" / "Stormy" – February 1963
- Brent Records
  - 7042 "The Girl From King Marie" / "Raggedy Ann" – April 1963
- Titan Records
  - 1734 "A Tear For Jesse" / "Devil Girl" – 1965
  - 1736 "Stranger in the Mirror" / "Requiem For Love" (with Bobbie Gentry) – 1965
- Pulsar Records
  - 2419 "Endless Sleep" / "My Baby's Eyes" – 1969
- Gusto Records
  - 0026 "Endless Sleep" / [unknown] 1976
- Tru Gems Records
  - LP 1002 Endless Sleep 1978
- Gee Dee Music
  - 270106 Endless Sleep (CD) (Germany, 1994)
  - 270142 Endless Sleep (CD) (Germany, 1998)
- Ace Records LTD
  - CDCHD 1474 - The Complete Demon & Titan Masters (England, 2016)
