= Last Kiss =

1961 single by Wayne Cochran

Single by Wayne Cochran
- B-side: "Funny Feeling"
- Released: September 1961
- Recorded: July 1961 (original version); 1963 (Macon, Georgia) (re-recorded version)
- Studio: UGA Campus (Athens, Georgia) (original version)
- Genre: Pop
- Label: Gala (original version); King (re-recorded version)
- Songwriter: Wayne Cochran

Wayne Cochran singles chronology
"The Coo" (1959)	"Last Kiss" (1961)	"Cindy Marie" (1962)

"Last Kiss" is a song written by Wayne Cochran and first recorded by Cochran in 1961 for the Gala label. Cochran's version failed to do well on the charts. Cochran re-recorded his song for the King label in 1963. It was revived by J. Frank Wilson and the Cavaliers, who took it to number two on the Billboard Hot 100 charts. Wednesday, Pearl Jam, and several international artists also covered the song, with varying degrees of success.

== Content ==
The singer borrows his father's car to take his girlfriend out on a date, and comes upon a stalled car in the road. Unable to stop, the singer swerves to the right to avoid it, loses control, and crashes violently, knocking his girlfriend and himself unconscious. The singer regains consciousness in the midst of a rainstorm, and finds several people at the scene of the collision. While partially blinded by the blood flowing from his injuries, the singer finds his girlfriend, still lying unconscious. When he cradles his girlfriend lovingly in his arms, she regains partial consciousness, smiles, and asks the singer to "hold me, darling, for a little while." The singer then gives her a last kiss as she dies.

In the song's chorus, the singer vows to be a good person so that he may reunite with his love when he dies, believing she has made it into Heaven.

== Background and inspiration ==
Wayne Cochran was initially inspired to write "Last Kiss" after having lived near a dangerous stretch of two-lane rural highway where several collisions occurred yearly. He began writing the song in 1956 or 1957, coming up with the chord progression, first verse, and chorus, but became stuck and abandoned the song for several years.

Cochran has claimed he was inspired to finish the song when he heard that a friend of a friend, 16-year-old Vera Janette "Jennie" Clark, had died in an automobile collision while on her first date. However, Clark's death occurred in December 1962, over a year after Cochran recorded the song, and five years after he says he finished writing it.

== Original version ==
In the summer of 1961, Wayne Cochran traveled to the University of Georgia in Athens, Georgia, to record "Last Kiss". Cochran (vocals), Joe Carpenter (guitar), Bobby Rakestraw (bass), and Jerry Reppert (drums) recorded the song for the Gala label, a small label based in Vidalia. Carpenter's obituary claims that he contributed lyrics to the song.

Cochran re-recorded the song for release on Aire Records (1962), in a slightly different tempo, with some changes to the lyrics and for re-release on King Records in 1963. In all, Cochran recorded four versions of the song: the original, Gala #117, Boblo Records #101, King Records #5856, and Aire Records #150, released as "Last Kiss" b/w "Edge of the Sea", with Cochran sharing vocals with an unnamed male vocalist. The Aire disc has heavy reverb and a staccato drumbeat. Aire Records, located in Dublin, Georgia, credited the song to Perry Music, as did the Gala recording. The Boblo disc credited "Last Kiss" to Macon Music, while the King record cited Boblo-BMI. The Boblo record featured "Last Kiss II" b/w "Hey! Baby" (Boblo 101-A), produced by Bobby Smith, offering another take on the song, with different lyrics, a faster tempo, and different instrumentation. A fifth version of the song was cobbled from the Boblo recording, rechanneled for stereo, on Radical Musik Records, probably around 1973.

On September 18, 1961, Billboard Music Week printed a review of the song "Last Kiss" and gave it three stars. Billboard gave four stars to the B-side, "Funny Feeling", which was written by Joe Carpenter and Milt "Pete" Skelton. The reviewer said, "Blues, chanted in relaxed style, with a funky guitar backing. Derivative but a good job." None of the records charted.

== J. Frank Wilson and the Cavaliers version ==
"Last Kiss"
- Danish vinyl single

Single by J. Frank Wilson and the Cavaliers

from the album Last Kiss
- B-side: "That's How Much I Love You"
- Released: June 1964
- Recorded: 1964
- Studio: Accurate Sound Co. (San Angelo, Texas)
- Genre: Pop, teen tragedy
- Length: 2:25
- Label: Josie
- Songwriter: Wayne Cochran
- Producers: Sonley Roush; Ron Newdoll

J. Frank Wilson and the Cavaliers singles chronology
"Last Kiss" (1964)	"Summertime" (1964)

"Last Kiss" was recorded in August 1964 by the Cavaliers of San Angelo, Texas, with J. Frank Wilson as singer. The record was first released locally, on Le Cam Records (#722), then on Tamara Records (#761), becoming a local hit. After being released on Josie Records (#923), a subsidiary of a semi-major label Jubilee Records, the record became a national hit in the fall of 1964, becoming one of the last hit teen tragedy songs in America, as The Beatles' debut on The Ed Sullivan Show earlier that year ushered in the British Invasion and put an end to many of the existing fads in American music.

Released on September 5, 1964, Josie 923 spent 15 weeks on the charts, reaching number two on November 7, right behind "Baby Love" by The Supremes. "Last Kiss" spent eight weeks in the top 10; the record sold over one million copies, earning the band a gold record. The Le Cam #722-A disc running time is 2:14, while both the Tamara Records #761 release and the Josie Records #923 platter have a time of 2:25.

On a concert trip to Ohio, the band had just left Parkersburg, West Virginia, heading to Lima, Ohio, for a performance at the Candy Cane Club. At about 5:15 am, the band's manager Sonley Roush fell asleep at the wheel. The car drifted across the centerline and rammed head-on into a trailer truck. Roush was killed, but Wilson, sitting in the front seat, and Bobby Wood (vocalist/piano) from Memphis, sitting in the back, survived with serious injuries, including broken ribs and a broken ankle. Wilson went on with the tour, though, taking only a week off. He came out on the stage on crutches to sing "Last Kiss" and "Hey, Little One". The collision had a curious effect on record sales, nevertheless, pushing the song to number two (it had previously stalled at number three) on the national charts.

The Last Kiss album cover shows Wilson kneeling over a young woman portraying the dying girl. Supposedly, first printings of the cover showed blood trickling down the girl's face, but it was air-brushed out by the record company for fear that alienating parents would limit sales of the album.

Wilson, with or without the Cavaliers, continued to record until 1978. He died on October 4, 1991, due to alcoholism. He was 49 years old.

=== Weekly charts ===
Chart (1964–1965)	Peak position
Canada (RPM)	2
New Zealand (Lever)	1
US Billboard Hot 100	2
US Cash Box Top 100	1

Chart (1973–1974)	Peak position
US Billboard Hot 100	92
US Cash Box Top 100	74

=== Year-end charts ===
Chart (1964)	Rank
US Billboard Hot 100	9

== Wednesday version ==
"Last Kiss"

Single by Wednesday

from the album Last Kiss
- B-side: "Without You"
- Released: November 1973
- Genre: Pop
- Label: Ampex
- Songwriter: Wayne Cochran
- Producer: John Dee Driscoll

Wednesday singles chronology
"Hang On Girl" (1971)	"Last Kiss" (1973)	"Teen Angel" (1974)

In 1973, "Last Kiss" was covered by the Canadian group Wednesday. Their version reached number two in Canada and number 34 in the United States. It is ranked as the 27th-biggest Canadian hit of 1973. Their version climbed up the charts very slowly, and spent three weeks longer on the American charts than the Cavaliers' much bigger hit.

As a result of the popularity of Wednesday's rendition, the Cavaliers' version was re-released (Virgo 506) at the end of 1973. It reached number 92 in January 1974, spending five weeks on the Billboard Hot 100. The original hit version recharted five weeks after the version by Wednesday entered the charts. Wednesday's version was an instant hit throughout the U.S. While growing up, Eddie Vedder first heard Wednesday's version, which he took an instant liking to. Later, when he came across the original recording at an antique mall, it reaffirmed his interest in the song, so much so that he decided to later record it with Pearl Jam.

=== Charts ===
==== Weekly charts ====
Chart (1973–1974)	Peak position
Australia (Kent Music Report)	68
Canada RPM Top Singles	2
US Billboard Hot 100	34
US Billboard Canada	1
US Cash Box Top 100	45
US Record World Singles	33

==== Year-end charts ====
Chart (1973)	Rank
Canada	27

Chart (1974)	Rank
Australia	194

== Pearl Jam version ==
"Last Kiss"

Single by Pearl Jam

from the album No Boundaries: A Benefit for the Kosovar Refugees
- B-side: "Soldier of Love"
- Released: June 8, 1999
- Recorded: 1998
- Venue: Constitution Hall (Washington, D.C.)
- Genre: Alternative rock
- Length: 3:16
- Label: Epic
- Songwriter: Wayne Cochran
- Producer: Pearl Jam

Pearl Jam singles chronology
"Wishlist" (1998)	"Last Kiss" (1999)	"Nothing as It Seems" (2000)

"Last Kiss" was also covered by American rock band Pearl Jam for the 1999 charity album No Boundaries: A Benefit for the Kosovar Refugees. It would later appear on the group's 2003 rarities album Lost Dogs. This version was successful, especially in Australia, where it topped the ARIA Singles Chart for seven weeks. It also reached number one in Iceland for six weeks and peaked at number two in the United States, making it the band's highest-charting single there.

=== Origin and recording ===
The idea to cover "Last Kiss" came about after vocalist Eddie Vedder found an old record of the song at the Fremont Antique Mall in Seattle, Washington. He convinced the rest of the band to try out the song, and it was performed a few times on the band's 1998 tour. The band eventually recorded the song at a soundcheck at Constitution Hall in Washington, D.C., and released it as a 1998 fan club Christmas single. The band spent only a few thousand dollars mixing the song. Bassist Jeff Ament said, "It was the most minimalist recording we've ever done."

=== Release and reception ===
In 1998, the cover of "Last Kiss" began to be played by radio stations and was ultimately put into heavy rotation across the US. By popular demand, the cover was released to the public as a single on June 8, 1999. The proceeds went to the aid of refugees of the Kosovo War. The cover was featured on the 1999 charity compilation album, No Boundaries: A Benefit for the Kosovar Refugees. The song helped earn about $10 million for Kosovo relief.

The cover reached number two on the US Billboard Hot 100, giving Pearl Jam their highest-peaking song on the Billboard Hot 100. It peaked at number four on the Top 40 Mainstream chart. The song reached number five on the Billboard Mainstream Rock Tracks chart and number two on the Billboard Modern Rock Tracks chart. The "Last Kiss" single has been certified gold by the RIAA.

Outside the United States, the song reached number two on the Canadian RPM 100 Tracks chart and number one on the Canadian Singles Chart, becoming the band's highest-charting song in Canada. It later charted on the RPM Rock Report, where it reached number four and stayed there for two weeks. In Europe, "Last Kiss" reached number 42 in the United Kingdom and number 77 in the Netherlands. In Australasia, "Last Kiss" peaked atop the Australian ARIA Singles Chart for seven weeks and became a top-20 success in New Zealand. It also reached number one in Iceland, staying at the summit for six weeks.

Christopher John Farley of Time said, "It's a spare, morose song with Vedder's voice warbling lovelorn over a straight-ahead drum beat. Going back to basics has put Pearl Jam back on top." Regarding the cover, guitarist Stone Gossard said, "You can try album after album to write a hit and spend months getting drum sounds and rewriting lyrics, or you can go to a used record store and pick out a single and fall in love with it." Pearl Jam included "Last Kiss" on the 2003 B-sides and rarities album, Lost Dogs, and on the 2004 greatest hits album, rearviewmirror (Greatest Hits 1991–2003).

=== Live performances ===
Pearl Jam first performed its cover of "Last Kiss" live at the band's May 7, 1998, concert in Seattle, at ARO.space. Live performances by Pearl Jam of "Last Kiss" can be found on various official bootlegs and the Live at the Gorge 05/06 box set. In 2022, Post Malone would cover Pearl Jam’s version of the song at his Live in Rome concert.

=== Track listing ===
CD, 7-inch, and cassette single

1. "Last Kiss" (Wayne Cochran) – 3:15
2. "Soldier of Love" (Buzz Cason, Tony Moon) – 2:54

=== Personnel ===
Personnel are taken from the Lost Dogs album booklet.

- Pearl Jam – production
  - Eddie Vedder – vocals
  - Stone Gossard – guitar
  - Mike McCready – guitar
  - Jeff Ament – bass
  - Matt Cameron – drums
- Brett Eliason – engineering, mixing

=== Charts ===
==== Weekly charts ====
Chart (1999)	Peak position
Australia (ARIA)	1
Belgium (Ultratip Bubbling Under Flanders)	6
Canada (Nielsen SoundScan)	1
Canada CHR (Nielsen BDS)	1
Canada Top Singles (RPM)	2
Canada Adult Contemporary (RPM)	16
Canada Rock/Alternative (RPM)	4
Costa Rica (Notimex)	1
Iceland (Íslenski Listinn Topp 40)	1
Netherlands (Dutch Top 40 Tipparade)	19
Netherlands (Single Top 100)	77
New Zealand (Recorded Music NZ)	19
Scottish Singles Sales (Official Charts)	43
UK Singles (Official Charts)	42
UK Rock & Metal (Official Charts)	2
US Billboard Hot 100	2
US Adult Alternative Airplay (Billboard)	5
US Adult Pop Airplay (Billboard)	5
US Alternative Airplay (Billboard)	2
US Mainstream Rock Airplay (Billboard)	5
US Pop Airplay (Billboard)	4
US Top 40 Tracks (Billboard)	6

==== Year-end charts ====
Chart (1999)	Position
Australia (ARIA)	4
Canada Top Singles (RPM)	23
Canada Adult Contemporary (RPM)	96
Canada Rock/Alternative (RPM)	22
US Billboard Hot 100	23
US Adult Top 40 (Billboard)	28
US Mainstream Rock (Billboard)	29
US Mainstream Top 40 (Billboard)	31
US Modern Rock Tracks (Billboard)	15
US Triple-A (Billboard)	40

Chart (2001)	Position
Canada (Nielsen SoundScan)	61

Chart (2002)	Position
Canada (Nielsen SoundScan)	99

==== Decade-end charts ====
Chart (1990s)	Position
Canada (Nielsen SoundScan)	17

=== Certifications ===
Region	Certification	Certified units/sales
Australia (ARIA)	3× Platinum	210,000^{^}
Brazil (Pro-Música Brasil)	Gold	30,000^{‡}
New Zealand (RMNZ)	2× Platinum	60,000^{‡}
United States (RIAA)	Gold	800,000
^{^} Shipments figures based on certification alone.^{‡} Sales+streaming figures based on certification alone.

=== Release history ===
Region	Date	Format(s)	Label(s)	Ref(s).
United States	December 1998	Fan club 7-inch vinyl	Epic	
United States	June 7, 1999	Hot adult contemporary; modern adult contemporary radio	Epic	
United States	June 8, 1999	Contemporary hit radio	Epic	
United States	June 8, 1999	CD; cassette	Epic	
Japan	June 23, 1999	CD	SME	
United Kingdom	August 2, 1999	7-inch vinyl; CD	Epic	

== Other cover versions ==
The song has a long tradition in Latin American popular music. The most popular version was recorded in 1965 by Mexican singer Polo (ex-member of Los Apson) with the title of "El Último Beso" in Spanish, translated by Mexican TV director and tennis teacher Omero Gonzalez, this Spanish version has been covered by several bands, notably by singer Alci Acosta who had a hit in 1967 in Colombia, as well as José "Joseíto" Martínez in 1990, the song with which he won a Congo de Oro in the Barranquilla Carnival. Mexican singer-songwriter Gloria Trevi released her version of the song in 1989, peaking at number 36 on the Billboard Hot Latin Songs chart. The song was covered by Canadian singer-songwriter Cœur de pirate in 2014 as part of the soundtrack to the Canadian drama series Trauma. The song was also covered by American rapper, singer, songwriter, and record producer Post Malone in Italy during his "One Night In Rome" performance on YouTube in June 2022.
