= Julie Brown =

American actress and television personality (born 1958)

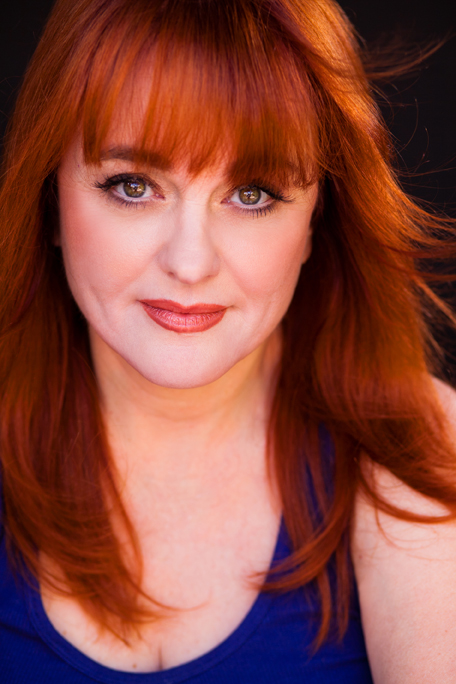
- Brown in 2012
- Born: Julie Ann Brown; August 31, 1958 (age 68); Van Nuys, California, U.S.
- Education: Van Nuys High School
- Occupations: Actress; comedian; singer; writer; director
- Years active: 1980–present
- Known for: Clueless; Earth Girls Are Easy
- Spouses: Terrence E. McNally (m. 1983; div. 1989) Ken Rathjen (m. 1993; div. 2007)
- Children: 1

Julie Ann Brown (born August 31, 1958) is an American actress, comedian, singer, writer, and director.

== Early life ==
Brown was born in Van Nuys, California, the daughter of Celia Jane (née McCann) and Leonard Francis Brown. Her father worked at NBC in the advertising scheduling department and her mother was a secretary at the same studio complex. Both of Brown's grandfathers had worked in the film business. Her great-grandfather was character actor Frank O'Connor.

She attended a Catholic elementary school as a child, and later Van Nuys High School. After attending Los Angeles Valley College, she enrolled in the American Conservatory Theater.

== Career ==
Brown began her career performing in nightclubs. She was a contestant on the game show Whew! (as Annie Brown). She started working on television with a guest spot on the sitcom Happy Days. She also appeared in the 1981 cult film Bloody Birthday. Following a small role in the Clint Eastwood comedy film Any Which Way You Can, comedian Lily Tomlin gave her a part in her 1981 film The Incredible Shrinking Woman. She made subsequent appearances on Laverne & Shirley, Buffalo Bill, The Jeffersons, and Newhart.

In 1984, Brown released her first EP, a five-song album called Goddess in Progress. The album parodies popular '80s music combined with her valley-girl personality. The songs "'Cause I'm a Blonde" and "The Homecoming Queen's Got a Gun" received international radio airplay.

In 1987, Brown released her first full-length album, Trapped in the Body of a White Girl. The album's music videos received airplay on MTV. In 1989, she created and starred in the MTV comedy and music-video show Just Say Julie. She played the role of a demanding, controlling, and pessimistic glamour-puss from the valley, making fun of popular music acts, while at the same time introducing their music videos. Her run on MTV overlapped with that of Downtown Julie Brown, causing confusion and dismay. “She’s kind of a loon. The only thing we had in common was our names and that we were on MTV at the same time,” Julie Brown later said of Downtown. “This is my new idea: When people look at me and go, ‘Are you Downtown Julie Brown?’—and they’re obviously not seeing a Black woman—I think I should go ‘Yes.’”

In 1989, CBS commissioned a pilot titled Julie Brown: The Show, featuring Brown as the hostess of a talk show. She would interview celebrity guests, interspersed with scripted scenarios. The pilot was aired, but the show was not picked up.

Brown's film career began in 1988 with the release of the film Earth Girls Are Easy, written by, produced by, and featuring Brown. It was based loosely on a song by the same name from her debut EP. The film also starred Jeff Goldblum, Geena Davis, and then-unknown comedians Jim Carrey and Damon Wayans. In 1990, she appeared in the film The Spirit of '76.

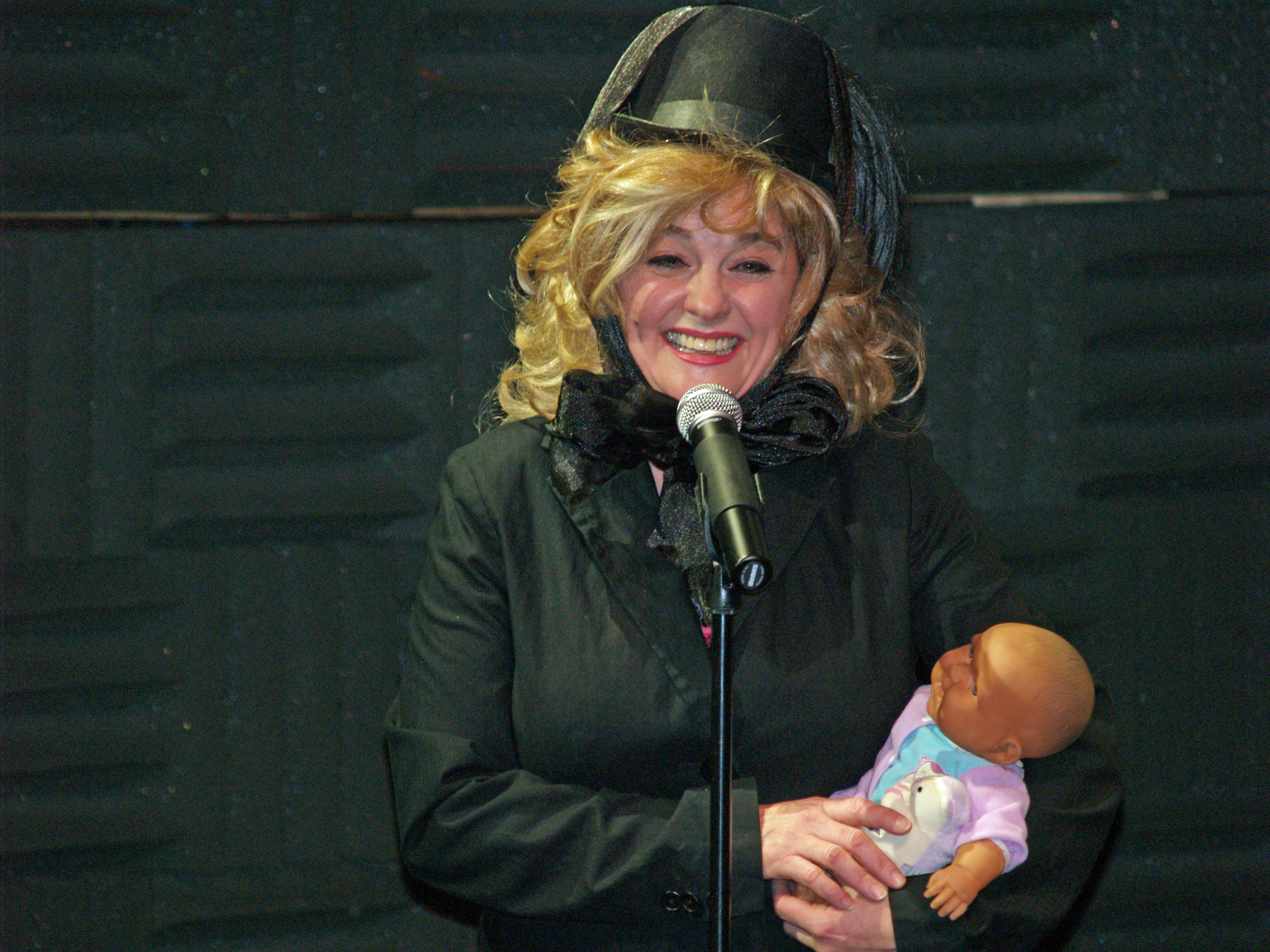
Brown performing in 2008 at The Public Theater in New York City

In 1991, NBC commissioned a half-hour comedy pilot titled The Julie Show. Created by Brown, Charlie Coffey, and director and executive producer David Mirkin, it followed actress Julie Robbins (Brown), who goes to great lengths to land an interview with teen singer Kiki (Kim Walker) in the hopes of getting hired as a tabloid-TV celebrity journalist. Developed under the working title The Julie Brown Show, it starred Marian Mercer as Julie's mother, June; DeLane Matthews as Debra Deacon, a reporter on the fictional series Inside Scoop; Susan Messing as Julie's roommate Cheryl; and Kevin O'Rourke as Inside Scoop producer Tony Barnow. Brown also served as producer and performed the theme song.

In 1992, Brown starred on the Fox sketch comedy show The Edge. The same year, she released the Showtime television film Medusa: Dare to Be Truthful, a satire about Madonna and her backstage documentary, Truth or Dare. She followed with another satire, Attack of the 5 Ft. 2 In. Women, which lampooned the violence of ice skater Tonya Harding toward rival Nancy Kerrigan, as well as that of widely publicized mutilator Lorena Bobbitt.

Brown has contributed voices to various cartoons, including Animaniacs as the voice of Minerva Mink, Aladdin as Saleen, and as the original voice of Zatanna in Batman: The Animated Series. She guest-starred on Tiny Toon Adventures as Julie Bruin, a cartoon bear version of herself, in which she guest-starred in her own segment "Just Say Julie Bruin", a reference to her music video show.

Brown appeared as Coach Millie Stoeger in the 1995 film Clueless, reprising the role on ABC's 1996–1999 spin-off television series, for which she also served as a writer, producer, and director. In 1998, Brown appeared in the parody film Plump Fiction. In 2000, she created the series Strip Mall for Comedy Central network.

Since 2004, Brown has been a commentator for E! network specials, including 101 Reasons the '90s Ruled, 101 Most Starlicious Makeovers, 101 Most Awesome Moments in Entertainment, and 50 Most Outrageous TV Moments. In 2005, Brown purchased the rights to her Trapped album from the record label and reissued it herself. She also self-released a single, "I Want to Be Gay". The single was originally released on Compact Disc only in a cardboard sleeve and made available exclusively through her website, or through eBay (via her own sales representative). It later became available for digital download. In 2007, she also purchased the rights to her 1984 E.P. Goddess in Progress and re-released it as a full-length record with compiled unreleased tracks. Later that year, she began touring with her one-woman show, Smell the Glamour.

In 2008, Brown co-wrote and appeared as Dee La Duke in the Disney Channel television film Camp Rock. The same year, she joined the cast of the Canadian television series Paradise Falls, and began releasing one-track digital singles. In 2011, she released an album called Smell the Glamour, which features satires of Lady Gaga and Kesha, and updated versions of her Medusa songs.

Beginning in 2010, Brown began a recurring role as Paula Norwood, a neighbor and friend of the Heck family, on the ABC sitcom The Middle. From 2010 to 2015, she was a writer for Melissa & Joey, and played a gym teacher in one episode of the show. In 2012, she appeared with Downtown Julie Brown as a guest judge on RuPaul's Drag Race.

== Personal life ==
In 1983, Brown married writer and actor Terrence E. McNally. They co-produced her first single, "I Like 'Em Big and Stupid". They divorced after six years. In 1994, Brown married Ken Rathjen, and together they have one son. She said in 2007 that she had recently divorced for the second time.

== Filmography ==
=== Film ===
Year	Title	Role	Notes
1980	Any Which Way You Can	Candy	
1981	The Incredible Shrinking Woman	TV Commercial Actress	
1981	Bloody Birthday	Beverly Brody	
1984	Dark Seduction	Tammy	
1985	Police Academy 2: Their First Assignment	Chloe	
1988	Earth Girls Are Easy	Candy Pink	
1990	The Spirit of '76	Ms. Liberty	
1991	Timebomb	Waitress at Al's Diner	Uncredited
1991	Shakes the Clown	Judy	
1992	Nervous Ticks	Nancy Rudman	
1992	The Opposite Sex and How to Live with Them	Zoe	
1995	A Goofy Movie	Lisa	Voice
1995	Clueless	Ms. Stoeger	
1995	Out There	Joleen McGillicuddy	
1997	Plump Fiction	Mimi Hungry	
1999	Wakko's Wish	Minerva Mink	Voice, direct-to-video
2000	Daybreak	Connie Spheres	
2002	The Trip	Receptionist	
2002	Like Mike	New Age Mother	
2006	Fat Rose and Squeaky	Squeaky	
2007	Boxboarders!	Anny Neptune	
2015	Mothers of the Bride	Peg	
2016	Christmas with the Andersons	Aunt Katie	

=== Television ===
Year	Title	Role	Notes
1980	Happy Days	Suzy Simmonds	Episode: "Ah! Wilderness"
1982	Laverne & Shirley	Secretary, Patti	2 episodes
1983	Scarecrow and Mrs. King	Barbie	Episode: "If Thoughts Could Kill"
1983	The Jeffersons	Cherry	Episode: "Who's the Fairist"
1983	We Got It Made	Didi West	Episode: "Sexiest Bachelor"
1985–88	Yogi's Treasure Hunt	Coinnie Kindly	Voice, episode: "Yogi Bear on the Air"
1986–88	Newhart	Buffy Denver	2 episodes
1990	Quantum Leap	Bunny O'Hare/Thelma Lou Dickey	Episode: "Maybe Baby (March 11, 1963)"
1990	Get a Life	Connie Bristol	Episode: "Terror on the Hell Loop 2000"
1990	Monsters	Wendy	Episode: "Small Blessings"
1991	Tiny Toon Adventures	Julie Bruin	Voice, episode: "Tiny Toon Music Television"
1992–93	Batman: The Animated Series	Lily, Zatanna	Voice, 2 episodes
1992–93	The Edge	Various	Main role; 19 episodes
1993	The Addams Family	Camp Counselor D.I. Holler	Voice, episode: "Camp Addams"
1994–95	Aladdin	Saleen	Voice, 2 episodes
1995	Band of Gold	Liz	2 episodes
1996	Tracey Takes On...	Mrs. Lynn Heiner	Episode: "Family"
1996	Quack Pack	Nelly the dragon	Voice, episode: "Leader of the Quack"
1993–97	Animaniacs	Minerva Mink	Voice, 6 episodes
1997	Murphy Brown	Secretary #88	Episode: "From the Terrace"
1998	Pinky and the Brain	Danette Spoonabello, Minerva Mink	Voice, 2 episodes
1999	Happily Ever After: Fairy Tales for Every Child	Lottie Bologna	Voice, episode: "The Three Little Pigs"
1996–99	Clueless	Coach Millie Deimer	15 episodes
1999–00	The New Woody Woodpecker Show	Judge, Customer	Voice, 4 episodes
2000–01	Strip Mall	Tammi Tyler	Main role; 22 episodes
2000	The Sylvester & Tweety Mysteries	Veterinarian #2	Voice, episode: "Dial V for Veterinarian"
2001	Oh Yeah! Cartoons	Mom	Voice, episode: "Elise: Mere Mortal"
2002	Family Affair	Ms. Felicity Robbins	Episode: "No Small Parts"
2005	Six Feet Under	Sissy Pasquese	Episode: "Time Flies"
2008	CSI: Crime Scene Investigation	Connie Dellaquilla	Episode: "Bull"
2008	Paradise Falls	Mimi Van Lux	5 episodes
2008	Wizards of Waverly Place	Miss Anna Marinovich	Episode: "Art Museum Piece"
2011	Big Time Rush	Rona	Episode: "Big Time Contest"
2012	Melissa & Joey	Coach Dalman	Episode: "Mother of All Problems"
2010–17	The Middle	Paula Norwood	13 episodes
2014	From Here on OUT	Gina	Episode: "The OUT Cover-(Up)"
2014	TMI Hollywood	Various	Episode: "Getting Down with Brown"
2019	Spirit Riding Free	Mrs. Dawn Hungerford	Voice

=== Television film ===
Title	Year	Role	Notes
Jane Doe	1983	Reporter	
Carol Leifer: Gaudy, Bawdy & Blue	1992	Rhona	
Attack of the 5 Ft. 2 In. Women	1994	Tonya Hardly/Lenora Babbitt	
Out There	1995	Joleen	
Alien Avengers II	1998	Rhonda	
Camp Rock	2008	Dee La Duke	Disney Channel Original Movie
The Wish List	2010	Wedding Planner	
My Santa	2013	Susie	
Gusty Frog	2013	Frankie's Mom	

=== Other work ===
Title	Year	Notes
Olivia Newton-John: Hollywood Nights	1980	Writer; television special
Earth Girls are Easy	1988	Writer
Just Say Julie	1989	Writer; co-producer
Quantum Leap	1990	Writer — "Maybe Baby (March 11, 1963)"
The Julie Show	1991	Creator; writer; producer
Medusa: Dare to Be Truthful	1992	Director; writer; executive producer
The Edge	1992–93	Writer — 20 episodes; producer — 20 episodes
Attack of the 5 Ft. 2 In. Women	1994	Director; writer
Rude Awakening	1998	Writer — "An Embarrassment of Ritch's"
Clueless	1996–99	Director — 1 episode; writer — 8 episodes; producer — 24 episodes; co-producer — 36 episodes
Strip Mall	2000	Executive producer
The Big House	2004	Writer — episode: "A Friend in Need"; consulting producer
Camp Rock	2008	Writer
Camp Rock 2: The Final Jam	2010	Based on characters
Melissa & Joey	2011	Writer — episode: "Do As I Say, Not As I Did"
Gusty Frog	2013	Writer; television film

== Discography ==
- Goddess in Progress (1984)
- Trapped in the Body of a White Girl (1987)
- Smell the Glamour (2010)

== Singles ==
- "I Like 'Em Big and Stupid" (w. B-side "The Homecoming Queen's Got a Gun")
- "Trapped in the Body of a White Girl"
- "Girl Fight Tonight!"
- "I Want to Be Gay" (sometimes titled "I Wanna be Gay")
- "The Homecoming Queen's Got a Gun"
- "The Art of Being Fabulous"
- "Another Drunk Chick" (a parody of the Kesha song "Tik Tok")
- "Big Clown Pants" (a parody of the Lady Gaga song "Bad Romance")
