= Terrence E. McNally =

American actor (born 1948)

- Born: May 29, 1948 (age 78); United States
- Occupations: Writer, actor, radio host
- Years active: 1977–2006
- Spouse: Julie Brown (m. 1983; div. 1989)

Terrence E. McNally (born May 29, 1948) is an American actor and radio host. He has appeared in such films and television shows as Star Trek: The Next Generation, Dallas, Knots Landing, Nine to Five, Taking Care of Business, Looker and Battle Beyond the Stars.

McNally produced the film Earth Girls Are Easy, which he co-wrote with and featured his then-wife, actress/singer Julie Brown. He also worked with her on a number of her early recordings.

For more than 15 years, McNally has hosted Free Forum on Pacifica Radio stations KPFK and WBAI. In 2013 he also hosted Cinema Interruptus at the Conference on World Affairs.

== Filmography ==
Year	Title	Role	Notes
1980	Battle Beyond the Stars	Gar	
1980	9 to 5	Policeman	
1981	Looker	Technician in Scanning Room	
1988	Earth Girls Are Easy	Soap Opera Doctor	
1989	Tap	Bob Wythe	
1990	Taking Care of Business	Hamilton	
1993	When the Party's Over	David Berryman	
2006	Two Weeks	Gerald Corwin	
