= Wednesday (Canadian band) =

Canadian pop vocal group (1971–1981)

- Also known as: Wenzday
- Origin: Oshawa, Ontario, Canada
- Genres: Pop
- Years active: 1971–1981
- Labels: Skyline, Celebration, Sussex
- Past members: Mike O'Neil; Paul Andrew Smith; John (Jose) Dufek; Randy Begg; Jeremy Thornton

Wednesday was a pop vocal group from Oshawa, Ontario, Canada. They scored a hit single on the U.S. Billboard Hot 100 in 1974 with their cover of the song "Last Kiss", which peaked at No. 34. That same year, they were nominated for the Canadian Juno Award for Most Promising Group. The single reached No. 2 in Canada and No. 1 on the Canadian Billboard 100. A follow-up single, a remake of "Teen Angel", was their final charting single in America. The parent album, entitled Last Kiss, was released on Ampex Records in Canada, Sussex Records in the U.S., and A&M Records throughout the rest of the world.

The group continued with success in Canada, before and after changing their name to Wenzday in 1976. They scored their second biggest hit with an Elton John cover, "Loving You Baby" which reached No. 6 in Canada.

The band reunited briefly in 2003 and 2017 for a few successful concerts. Paul Andrew Smith went on to record several solo albums - A Stranger in My Own World, Above the Stars, AGO, Masks and Mummeries, Time, and The Power of Schnoz on Moondog Records under Black Violet Project.

In September 2022, Wednesday was inducted into the OMA Hall of Fame with a lifetime achievement award presented to them at the event by their long-time producer John Driscoll.

On December 20, 2022, drummer Randy Begg died of a heart attack in his home, at the age of 71.

== Members ==
- Mike O'Neil - guitar, lead vocals, banjo
- Paul Andrew Smith - guitar, backing and lead vocals, keyboards
- John (Jose) Dufek - bass, backing vocals, harmonica, percussion
- Randy Begg - drums, backing and lead vocals, guitar (died December 20, 2022)
- Jeremy Thornton - keyboards

== Discography ==
=== Albums ===
- 1974 - Last Kiss - Ampex AC-10152
- 1976 - Loving You Baby - Skyline SKY 10160
- 1977 - Nearly Made It (as Wenzday) - Skyline SKY 10164-V
- 2003 - The Singles - Moondog Records EMC 0403
- 2003 - Limited Edition Moondog Records EMC 0402
- 2004 - The Singles - collection of single releases including all charted material
- 2017 - Afterlight - best of compilation

=== Singles ===
- 1971 - "Hang On Girl" / "Velvet Colours" - Ampex AC-1304
- 1973 - "Last Kiss" / "Without You" - Ampex AC-1325 [CAN #2, US #34, AUS #68]
- 1974 - "Teen Angel" / "Taking Me Home" - Ampex AC-1355 [CAN #15, US #79]
- 1974 - "Roses Are Red" / "Ride" - Ampex AC-1362 [CAN #43]
- 1974 - "Fly Away" / "Good Time Girl" - Ampex AC-1365 [CAN #21]
- 1975 - "She's a Woman" / "Good Time Girl" - Ampex AC-1370
- 1975 - "Here Today Gone Tomorrow" / "What's on My Mind" - Skyline SKY 001X [CAN #49]
- 1975 - "Loving You Baby" / "Don't Let Me Wait Too Long" - Skyline SKY 003X [CAN #6]
- 1976 - "Doing the Best That I Can" / "Could You Refuse Her" - Skyline SKY 006X [CAN #52]

as Wenzday:

- 1976 - "Ruby Baby" / "Melody Moon" - Skyline SKY 011X [CAN #36]
- 1977 - "Fancy Pants" / "Through Your Head" - Skyline SKY 012X
- 1977 - "Ride Me" / "Nearly Made It" - Skyline SKY 014X [CAN #47]
- 1977 - "Now You're a Lady" / "Dream Queen" - Skyline SKY 016X
- 1981 - "Eleanor" / "Sheila"
