= Ace (disambiguation) =

An ace is a playing card.

Ace, Aces, ACE or ACES may also refer to:

== Arts, entertainment and media ==
=== Gaming ===
- ACE (video game), a 1985 flight simulator
- Another Century's Episode, a 2005 video game
- Ace Online, a flight-based online role-playing game

=== Music ===
==== Groups ====
- Ace (band), a 1970s British rock group
- The Aces (blues band), a 1950s–1970s American group
- The Aces (indie pop band), a 2010s American group
- The Aces (Jamaican group), a 1965–1980s group, associated with Desmond Dekker
- A.C.E (South Korean band), a boy group
- The Aces (rock and roll band), a British group formed in the 1950s

==== Labels ====
- Ace Records (United Kingdom)
- Ace Records (United States)

==== Albums and songs ====
- Ace (Bob Weir album), 1972
- Ace (Ian Van Dahl album), 2002
- Ace (Madison Cunningham album), 2025
- Aces (album), by Suzy Bogguss, 1991
  - "Aces" (song)
- Ace (Scooter album), 2016
- Ace (EP), by Taemin, 2014
- "Aces", by Fall Out Boy, 2026

=== Other uses in arts, entertainment and media ===
- ACE Awards, now CableACE Award
- Ace Comics, a 1937-1959 comic book series
- Aces: A Story of the First Air War, a 1993 Canadian historical drama film
- Ace (film), a 2025 Indian Tamil-language comedy
- ACE (magazine) (Advanced Computer Entertainment), a British computer and video game magazine
- Ace (musical), by Robert Taylor and Richard Oberacker, 2006
- Ace the Dog, a sandstone sculpture in Warsaw, Poland
- Ace (book), a 2020 book about asexuality by Angela Chen
- Aces, a class of fictional characters in the Wild Cards books and short stories

== Businesses and organizations ==
=== Manufacturers ===
- Ace Aircraft Manufacturing Company, in Wichita, Kansas, US, from 1929
- Ace Motor Corporation, a 1919–1927 American motorcycle company
- Ace Tone (Ace Electronic Industries Inc.), a musical instrument company
- ACeS, an Indonesian satellite-telecommunications company
- Aberdeen Community Energy, a micro hydro scheme in Scotland
- Action Computer Enterprise, an American computer company 1978–1990
- Action Construction Equipment, an Indian material handling and construction equipment manufacturing company
- Aircraft Engineering Corporation, founded in New York in 1919
- Alternative Chassis Engineering, an English vehicle manufacturer

=== Media companies ===
- Accelerated Christian Education, an educational products company
- Ace Books, an American publisher of science fiction and fantasy
- Ace Cinemas, an Australian cinema chain
- ACE Gallery, a contemporary art gallery in Los Angeles, US
- Ace Magazines, a 1940-1956 a comic-book and pulp-magazine publishing company
- Ace Radio, an Australian media company
- Aces Studio, a former video game company
- ACE Team, a Chilean video game company
- Ace TV, an American family-oriented television network
- ACE TV, a former community television channel in Adelaide, South Australia

=== Other businesses ===
- ACE Aviation Holdings, former parent company of Air Canada
- ACE Freighters, a defunct airline
- Ace Hardware, an American retailers' cooperative
- Ace Hotel, a chain of hotels headquartered in Los Angeles and New York City, US
- ACE Limited, a property and casualty insurer that acquired Chubb Limited
- ACE Scotland, a defunct airline
- ACES Colombia (Aerolíneas Centrales de Colombia), a defunct airline

=== Educational organisations ===
- Alternative Center for Excellence, a school at the Joseph W. Pepin Memorial Building Danbury, Connecticut, US
- American College of Education, an online college based in Indianapolis, Indiana, US
- American Council on Education, a higher education association
- Australian College of Educators, an Australian professional association
- Aviation Centre of Excellence, a department of Confederation College in Ontario, Canada

=== Business and professional associations ===
- ACES: The Society for Editing, formerly American Copy Editors Society
- Alliance for Creativity and Entertainment, an anti online-piracy coalition
- American Cinema Editors, an honorary society of film editors
- American College of Epidemiology, an American professional association
- Association for Consultancy and Engineering, a British business association

=== Other organizations ===
- ACE Electoral Knowledge Network, a web portal with information on elections
- Advisory Committee of Experts on Slavery, a committee of the League of Nations
- Agriculture in Concert with the Environment, a program of the US Environmental Protection Agency
- Alliance of Confessing Evangelicals, an organization of Christian individuals
- Alternatives for Community and Environment, an American environmental justice organization
- American Coaster Enthusiasts, a non-profit organization
- Animal Charity Evaluators, an American non-profit organization
- Anime Contents Expo, a Japanese trade fair
- Arts Council England
- Association for Consciousness Exploration, an American organization
- Association of European Cinematheques (Association des Cinémathèques Européennes), an affiliation of European film archives
- Association of Latin Entertainment Critics (Spanish: Asociación de Cronistas de Espectáculos de Nueva York)
- Assyria Council of Europe, a lobbying organization based in Brussels
- Astronaute Club Européen, a French space tourism association

== Military ==
- Ace (military), a successful military professional who has accumulated a meaningfully measurable statistic
  - Flying ace, credited with shooting down a set number of enemy aircraft
  - Panzer ace, a successful German tank commander
- ACES Meet, a multilateral air exercise
- Allied Command Europe, central command of NATO forces in Europe
- IWI Galil ACE, a series of rifles
- HMS Ace, a British submarine
- M9 armored combat earthmover, a tracked vehicle
- United States Army Corps of Engineers (USACE)
- Aviation Combat Element, the aviation component of the US Marine Air-Ground Task Force

== People and fictional characters ==
- Ace (name), including a list of people and fictional characters with the given name, nickname, surname, ring name or stage name
  - Ace (gamer), American professional Halo player
  - Ace (musician), guitarist with Skunk Anansie

== Places ==
- Ace, Texas, US
- Ace, ancient name of Acre, Israel
- ACE Basin, the estuaries of the Ashepoo, Combahee and Edisto Rivers in South Carolina, US
- Aces (parish), Candamo, Spain
- Aces (river), a river of Asia in Ancient Greek writing

== Science and technology ==
=== Aerospace ===
- Adaptive cycle engine, or variable cycle engine, a jet engine design
- Advanced Composition Explorer, a NASA satellite mission
- Advanced Crew Escape Suit, an astronaut suit
- Advanced Cryogenic Evolved Stage, a proposed rocket 2nd stage by United Launch Alliance
- Atmospheric Chemistry Experiment, a project of the Canadian satellite SCISAT-1
- Atomic Clock Ensemble in Space, a European Space Agency project
- Edel Ace, a South Korean paraglider design

=== Biology, chemistry and medicine ===
- ACE inhibitor, a drug that lowers blood pressure
- ACE mixture, an historical anesthetic
- ACE unit (Acute care of elderly), a type of hospital facility
- ACES (buffer), one of Good's buffers
- ACES (nutritional supplement), containing vitamins A, C, E and selenium
- Acepromazine, an antipsychotic drug used primarily in animals
- Addenbrooke's Cognitive Examination, neuropsychological tests
- Adverse childhood experiences
- Angiotensin-converting enzyme, involved in controlling blood pressure

=== Computing ===
- ACE (compressed file format)
- Ace (editor), a code editor written in JavaScript
- ACE (editor), a desktop-based collaborative editor
- ACE (genomic file format), for storing data about genomic contigs
- ACES (computational chemistry), a software package
- Access-control entries in an access-control list in computer security
- Adaptive Communication Environment, an open-source network-programming framework
- Advanced Computerized Execution System, a NASDAQ subscription service
- Advanced Computing Environment, a 1990s initiative for commodity computing hardware
- Agent-based computational economics
- Anti-Cheat Expert, a game security product by Tencent
- Arbitrary code execution, In computer security
- ASCII Compatible Encoding, a prefix related to internationalized domain names
- Asynchronous Compute Engine, a component defined in AMD's Graphics Core Next for ATI-type products
- Automatic Computing Engine, an early British computer design by Alan Turing
- Automatic content extraction, a research program for developing advanced information extraction technologies
- Jupiter Ace, a 1980s British computer

=== Other uses in science and technology ===
- Ace (quark model), an obsolete term for quark
- ACE experiment, the Antiproton Cell Experiment hosted at CERN
- Academy Color Encoding System, a color image encoding system
- Accumulated cyclone energy, a metric to compare tropical cyclones
- Africa Coast to Europe (cable system), a submarine communications cable
- Aggregative Contingent Estimation Program, a program of the US Intelligence Advanced Research Projects Agency
- Alternating conditional expectations, an algorithm in nonparametric regression
- Attempto Controlled English, a controlled natural language from the University of Zurich

== Sports ==
=== Terminology ===
- Ace (baseball), a team's best starting pitcher
- Ace (golf), a hole in one
- Ace (pickleball), a serve that is not returned by the receiver
- Ace (tennis), a point won by the server without contest
- Ace formation, in American football

=== Teams ===
- Alaska Aces (ECHL), an American ice hockey team
- Alaska Aces (PBA), a Philippine basketball team
- Alexandria Aces, a defunct American baseball team in Louisiana
- Asheville Aces, a defunct American ice hockey team
- Belle Vue Aces, an English motorcycle speedway team
- Cornwall Aces, a Canadian ice hockey team 1993-1996
- Dallas Aces, an American professional bridge team
- Evansville Purple Aces, sports teams of the University of Evansville
- Las Vegas Aces, an American basketball team in the Women's National Basketball Association
- Las Vegas Aces (ABA), an American basketball team in the American Basketball Association
- Lower Merion High School Aces, the athletic teams at the school in Philadelphia, US
- Melbourne Aces, an Australian baseball team
- Northeast League Aces, a 2004 baseball team
- Quebec Aces, a Canadian ice hockey team 1928-1971
- Reno Aces, an American baseball team in Nevada
- Victoria Aces, an Australian baseball team

== Transportation ==
=== Air ===
- Lanzarote Airport in Canary Islands, Spain, IATA airport code ACE

=== Roads and vehicles ===
- AC Ace, a 1953-1963 British sports car
- Ace (1913 automobile), a British car
- Ace (1920 automobile), an American car
- Atlantic City Expressway, in New Jersey, US
- Tata Ace, a model of mini truck by Tata Motors

=== Rail ===
- Altamont Corridor Express, a commuter rail service in California, US
- Atlantic City Express Service, a former New York–New Jersey rail service
- Atlantic Coast Express, an express passenger train in England
- EMD SD70ACe, an American diesel-electric locomotive commonly referred to as an "Ace"
- Kintetsu 22600 series "Ace", a Japanese train type

== Other uses ==
- Ace Cinema, a building in the London Borough of Harrow
- Ace, a colloquial term for an asexual person
- Action for Climate Empowerment, a term adopted by the United Nations Framework Convention on Climate Change
- Ace, a brand in South America and elsewhere of laundry detergent Tide
- Ace, a series of Rockman musical technology products by Scholz Research & Development, Inc.
- Acehnese language, ISO 639 language code ace
- American Clean Energy and Security Act (ACES), 2009 US legislative bill
- Automation of Central Excise and Service Tax, a Central Excise Mission Mode Project in India

== See also ==
- (includes ACE)
- (includes ACES)
- Ace of aces (disambiguation)
- Ace1 (disambiguation)
- Ace 2 (disambiguation)
- Ace K, or acesulfame potassium, an artificial sweetener
- IND Eighth Avenue Line, New York City Subway line served by the A, C, and E trains
