= Accel =

Accel may refer to:

- Accel (interbank network), an American payment network
- Accel Animation Studios, an Indian animation studio
- Accel Energy, Australian electricity generator
- Accel (company), an American venture capital company formerly known as Accel Partners
- Altium, formerly Accel Technologies a former San-Diego–based CAD vendor
- Accel TET, trade name for Disulfiram, a drug used to treat alcoholism
- Accel Transmatic, an Indian research and development company
- Rolls-Royce ACCEL, a protypal airplane

== See also ==
- Accell NV, Dutch bicycle company
- Accel World, a 2009 Japanese light-novel series written by Reki Kawahara and illustrated by HiMA
  - Accel World: Infinite Burst, a Japanese animated film based on the novel series, released July 2016
- Acceleration (disambiguation)
- Accelerator (disambiguation)
- Accelerate (disambiguation)
- ACELL (disambiguation)
- Acel (disambiguation)
