= Acel =

Acel or variation, may refer to:

== People ==
- Acel (surname)
  - Ervin Acél (disambiguation)
- Acel Bisa (born 1976) aka Acel Van Ommen, Philippine singer-songwriter
- Acel Moore (1940-2016), American journalist

== Places ==
- al-Acel, Syria; a village involved in the Battle of Tabqa (2017)

== Other uses ==
- Association of Luxembourg Student Unions (ACEL; founded 1984; French: Association des cercles d'étudiants luxembourgeois)
- Association of Christian Educators of Louisiana, an American football sports league, see List of Louisiana state high school football champions

== See also ==
- Accell NV, Dutch bicycle company
- CEL (disambiguation)
- ACELL (disambiguation)
- Accel (disambiguation)
- Acei (disambiguation)
- Ace1 (disambiguation)
