= ACELL =

ACELL may refer to:

- Advancing Chemistry by Enhancing Learning in the Laboratory, an Australian chemistry teaching project
  - Australasian Chemistry Enhanced Laboratory Learning, of the Royal Australian Chemical Institute
- ACell Incorporated, an American biotechnology company specializing in regenerative medicine
- Federació Catalana d'Esports per a Disminuïts Psíquics (abbreviated "ACELL"; formerly Associació Catalana d'Esports i Lleure), a Spanish sports federation for the mentally challenged in Catalonia; a component federation of the Sports Federation Union of Catalonia

== See also ==
- Accell NV, Dutch bicycle company
- Cell (disambiguation)
- Ace 2 (disambiguation)
- Accel (disambiguation)
- Acel (disambiguation)
