= AKES =

Akes or AKES may refer to:

- Akes (river)
- Akes, Georgia, US
- Aga Khan Education Services
