= SLSB =

SLSB may refer to:

- Capitán Germán Quiroga Guardia Airport, Bolivia, ICAO airport code SLSB
- School of Life Science and Biomedical at Notre Dame University Bangladesh
- Sri Lanka Savings Bank
- Société lyonnaise des schistes bitumineux, at Les Télots Mine, France
- SLSB, a Luxembourg Student Union in Great Britain
