= Accelerator =

Accelerator may refer to:

== In science and technology ==
=== In computing ===
- Download accelerator, or download manager, software dedicated to downloading
- Hardware acceleration, the use of dedicated hardware to perform functions faster than a CPU
  - Graphics processing unit or graphics accelerator, a dedicated graphics-rendering device
    - Accelerator (library), a library that allows the coding of programs for a graphics processing unit
  - Cryptographic accelerator, performs decrypting/encrypting
- Web accelerator, a proxy server that speeds web-site access
- Accelerator (Internet Explorer), a form of selection-based search
- Accelerator table, specifies keyboard shortcuts for commands
- Apple II accelerators, hardware devices designed to speed up an Apple II computer
- PHP accelerator, speeds up software applications written in the PHP programming language
- SAP BI Accelerator, speeds up online analytical processing queries
- SSL/TLS accelerator, offloads public-key encryption algorithms to a hardware accelerator
- TCP accelerator, intermediate communications processor
- Keyboard shortcut, a set of key presses that invoke a software or operating system operation
- Accelerator or AFU (Accelerator Function Unit): a component of IBM's Coherent Accelerator Processor Interface (CAPI)

=== In physics and chemistry ===
- Accelerator (chemistry), a substance that increases the rate of a chemical reaction
- Araldite accelerator 062, or Dimethylbenzylamine, an organic compound
- Cement accelerator, an admixture that speeds the cure time of concrete
- Particle accelerator, a device which uses electric and/or magnetic fields to propel charged particles to high speeds
  - Accelerator-driven system (ADS), a nuclear reactor coupled to a particle accelerator
  - Accelerator mass spectrometry (AMS), a form of mass spectrometry
- Tanning accelerator, chemicals that increase the effect of ultraviolet radiation on human skin
- Vulcanizing accelerators, chemical agents to speed the vulcanization of rubber

=== Firearms ===
- .22 Accelerator or Remington Accelerator, a type of .224 caliber bullet
- Electricothermal accelerator, a weapon that uses a plasma discharge to accelerate its projectile
- Magnetic accelerator gun, a weapon that converts magnetic energy into kinetic energy for a projectile
- Ram accelerator, a device for accelerating projectiles using ramjet or scramjet combustion
- Produce accelerators, cannons which use air pressure or combustion to launch large projectiles at low speed

=== Other technologies ===
- Accelerator pedal or gas pedal, the foot pedal-controlled throttle on an automobile that controls its engine power
- Accelerator Coaster, a roller coaster that uses hydraulic acceleration

== In entertainment ==
- The Accelerators, US rock band
- Accelerator (Royal Trux album), their seventh studio album, released in 1998
- Accelerator (The Future Sound of London album), released in 1992
- "Accelerator", a 1993 single by Gumball
- "Accelerator", a song by band The O.A.O.T.'s, on their album Typical
- "Accelerator", a song by the band Primal Scream from their album XTRMNTR
- "Accelerator", a song by the band Blusher
- XLR8R (pronounced "accelerator"), a magazine and website that covers music, culture, style, and technology
- Accelerator (To Aru Majutsu No Index), a fictional character in the light novel series A Certain Magical Index and the manga series A Certain Scientific Accelerator
- Accelerator (Universal Studios Singapore), a whirling twirling ride that spins guests around
- PC Accelerator, a personal computer game magazine
- The Accelerators (comics), a comic book created by Ronnie Porto and Gavin Smith

== Other uses ==
- Seed- or startup-accelerator, an organization that offers advice and resources to help small businesses grow
- Accelerator effect, economic stimulus to private fixed investment due to growth in aggregate demand
- Saskatoon Accelerators, a professional soccer team based in Saskatoon, Canada
- Accelerationism, critical and social theory

== See also ==
- Accelerant
- Acceleration (disambiguation)
- Accelerate (disambiguation)
