= Ace (name) =

Name list

Ace is a given name, nickname, and surname. Notable people and fictional characters with the name include:

== People with the given name ==
- Ace Adams (1910–2006), American Major League Baseball relief pitcher
- Ace Andres (born 1958), American guitarist, songwriter, vocalist, and political activist
- Ace Atkins (born 1970), American crime reporter and author
- Ace Loomis (1928–2003), American National Football League player
- Ace Mahbaz (born 1986), Iranian actor and writer
- Ace Norton (born 1982), Japanese-American filmmaker and artist
- Ace Reese (born 2005), American baseball player
- Ace Rusevski (born 1956), Macedonian retired boxer who represented Yugoslavia at the 1976 Summer Olympics
- Ace Vergel (1952–2007), Filipino actor
- Ace Von Johnson, American guitarist

== People with the nickname ==
- Alfredo Aceves (born 1982), Major League Baseball relief pitcher
- Jim Adams (lacrosse) (c. 1929–2019), American retired lacrosse coach, member of the National Lacrosse Hall of Fame
- Ace Bailey (1903–1992), Canadian National Hockey League player
- Garnet Bailey (1948–2001), Canadian National Hockey League player and scout who died in 9/11 attacks
- Ace Barbers (born 1969), Filipino politician
- Ace Bhatti (born 1970), British actor
- Ace Brigode (1893–1960), American dance band leader and musician
- Ace Cannon (1934–2018), American saxophonist
- Ace Custis (born 1974), American basketball player and coach
- Austin Dillon (born 1990), American racing driver nicknamed "The Ace"
- Ace Durano (born 1970), Filipino politician
- Ace Enders (born 1982), America lead singer and guitarist of the band The Early November
- Rich Franklin (born 1974), American MMA fighter
- Ace Frehley (1951–2025), rock and roll guitarist and member of the rock band Kiss
- Leo Gottlieb (1920–1972), American basketball player
- Ace Gruenig (1913–1958), American basketball player
- Ace Gutowsky (1909–1976), American National Football League player
- Ace Harris (1910–1964), American jazz pianist
- Ace Herman (1913–1971), American film editor and producer
- Ace Kefford (born 1946), English rock bass guitarist
- Ace Khuse (born 1968), South African retired association football player and current interim coach
- James Lyons (admiral) (1927–2018), United States Navy admiral
- Ace Magashule (born 1959), South African politician
- Ace Mumford (1898–1962), African-American college football head coach
- Patrick Ntsoelengoe (1952–2006), South African footballer
- Ace Parker (1912–2013), American National Football League quarterback and Major League Baseball player and coach, member of Pro Football Hall of Fame
- Ace Powell (1912–1978), American painter, sculptor, and etcher
- Ace Reid (1925–1991), American cartoonist
- Ace Sanders (born 1991), American National Football League player
- Ace Stewart (1869–1912), Major League Baseball player in 1895
- Judd Trump (born 1989), snooker player nicknamed "The Ace"
- Ace Williams (1917–1999), American Major League Baseball pitcher
- Ace Young (born 1980), American singer, songwriter, and actor

== People with the stage name or pen name ==
- Ace (gamer) (born 1993), American Halo player Aaron Elam
- Ace and Vis, British radio presenters
- Ace Backwords (born 1956), underground cartoonist
- Ace Hood (born 1989), American rapper Antoine McColister
- Ace Wilder (born 1982), Swedish singer Alice Gernandt
- Buddy Ace (1936–1994), American blues singer James Lee Land
- Johnny Ace (1929–1954), American singer John Marshall Alexander Jr.
- Mellow Man Ace (born 1967), American rapper Ulpiano Sergio Reyes

== People with the ring name ==
- Ace Austin (born 1997), American professional wrestler Austin Highley
- Ace Darling (born 1974), American professional wrestler Charleston Diggler
- Ace Hood (born 1988), American rapper Antoine McColister
- Ace Romero (born 1990), American professional wrestler Justin Romero
- Ace Steel (born 1973), American professional wrestler Christopher Guy
- Ace Wilder (born 1982), Swedish singer and songwriter Alice Gernandt
- Johnny Ace (born 1962), American professional wrestler John Laurinaitis
- Ace Felistas (born 2002), Zimbabwean Chief Accountant

== People with the surname ==
- Goodman Ace (1899–1982), American humorist, radio writer and comedian, television writer, and magazine columnist born Goodman Aiskowitz
- Jane Ace (1897–1974), American radio performer, wife of Goodman Ace
- Juliet Ace (born 1938), British dramatist, playwright and radio and television writer

== Fictional characters ==
- Ace, a Reptool in the animated series Dinotrux
- Ace (Doctor Who)
- Ace (G.I. Joe)
- Ace, a character by Warren Furman in 1992 British TV series Gladiators
- Ace, a member of the Royal Flush Gang in the DC Animated Universe
- Ace, a race car in Thomas & Friends
- Ace Blackwell, in Half & Half
- Ace Bunny, in Loonatics Unleashed
- Ace Drummond, the title character of the comic strip Ace Drummond
- Rory Gilmore, from Gilmore Girls – nicknamed Ace by Logan Huntsburger
- Ace Lightning, in Ace Lightning
- Acelin Ace McDougal, character in Get Ace
- John "Ace" Merrill, the main antagonist of Stephen King's The Body
- Ace Riker, from the animated series M.A.S.K.
- Ace Rimmer, an alter ego of Arnold Rimmer in Red Dwarf
- Ace Ventura, in Ace Ventura media
- Acid Ace, a supporting character in Mega Man Star Force 3
- Portgas D. Ace, in One Piece
- Ultraman Ace, from the Japanese television drama of the same name
- Eight Ace, from the British adult comic Viz
- Ace Copular, the leader of the Gangreen Gang from The Powerpuff Girls show
- Ace, a jock bird character in the Animal Crossing series
- Ace, an editable character in the challenge mode of the game Street Fighter EX3
- Ace, alter-ego of Dexter, the main protagonist of the 1984 video game Space Ace
- Ace, a playable character in Square Enix's action role-playing game Final Fantasy Type-0
- Ace, a duck in the English-language version of the animated film Leafie, A Hen into the Wild
- Ace, a female costume character in the video game Fortnite
- Ace, a yellow anthropomorphic car in the British preschool TV series Thomas & Friends
- Ace Visconti, a lucky gambler and playable Survivor in the video game Dead by Daylight
- Ace Rothstein, a mobster based on Frank Rosenthal in the movie Casino
- Ace Sorensen, a character in Paw Patrol
- Ace Ukiyo, the protagonist of the tokusatsu series Kamen Rider Geats
- Ace, a Warrior in The Warriors
- Ace Cooper "Magician", protagonist of the French cartoon The Magician
- Ace McCloud, the Daring Air Operations Expert from The Centurions
- Ace Yu, the detective protagonist of the Muppets special Dog City
- Ace Hart, the detective protagonist of the animated spin-off series Dog City
- Ace the Bat-Hound, a canine crime-fighting partner of Batman
- Ace the Warhawk, the mascot for the Louisiana–Monroe Warhawks of the University of Louisiana at Monroe
- Ace the Wonder Dog, a canine actor active in the 1930s and 1940s

== See also ==
- Ace (disambiguation)
