= Acei =

Acei or variation, may refer to:

- ACE inhibitor (ACEI) Angiotensin-converting-enzyme inhibitors
- Pseudotropheus sp. "acei" (fish), the acei, a cichlid
- Association for Childhood Education International
- Association for Cultural Economics International
- Canadian Internet Registration Authority (ACEI; French: Autorité canadienne pour les enregistrements Internet), a bilingual authority in bilingual Canada
- Automobile Central Enterprise, Inc., a subsidiary of Philippine company AC Industrials

== See also ==
- CEI (disambiguation)
- Ace1 (disambiguation)
- Acel (disambiguation)
