= Deuce (nickname) =

Deuce or The Deuce is a nickname for:

== Deuce ==
- Mike Archie (born 1972), American former National Football League running back
- Paul Begley (fl. 2000-present), Gaelic footballer from Ireland
- Clint Dempsey (born 1983), American soccer player
- Danielle Downey (1980–2014), American golfer
- Reuben Fatheree II (born 2002), American football player
- Deuce Alexander (born 2005), American football player
- Deuce Bailey (born 2007), American football player
- Deuce Knight (born 2006), American football player
- Deuce Lutui (born 1983), Tongan former National Football League player
- Deuce McAllister (born 1978), American retired National Football League player
- Deuce Vaughn (born 2001), American football player
- Duece Watts (born 1999), American football player

== The Deuce ==
- David Palmer (American football) (born 1972), American former National Football League player
- Henry Ford II (1917–1987), or "Hank the Deuce", an American automotive businessman

== See also ==
- Deuce (disambiguation)
- Ace (name)
- Trey (disambiguation)
