= Typical =

Typical may refer to:

- Typical (album), Peter Hammill
- "Typical" (song), song by MuteMath
- "Typical", song by Frazier Chorus from Sue, 1987
- Typical, story collection by Padgett Powell, 1991
- Typical, song by Raven-Symoné from This Is My Time, 2004

== See also ==
- Typical Rick, an American Comedy Central television series
