= CEI =

CEI may refer to:

== Organizations ==
- Central European Initiative, a forum of regional cooperation in Central and Eastern Europe
- Clean Energy Institute, a renewable energy research institute at the University of Washington, in Seattle, Washington, US
- Cleveland Electric Illuminating Company, a defunct American utility company
- College of Eastern Idaho, a public community college in Idaho Falls, Idaho, US
- Commission électorale indépendante (Democratic Republic of the Congo) or Independent Electoral Commission, former name of the Independent National Electoral Commission
- Commission électorale indépendante (Ivory Coast) or Independent Electoral Commission, body that oversees elections in Ivory Coast
- Competitive Enterprise Institute, an American libertarian think tank
- Conferenza Episcopale Italiana or Episcopal Conference of Italy, conference of Roman Catholic bishops
- Council of Engineering Institutions, later the Engineering Council, a British regulatory authority
- Creative Engineering, Inc., American company
- Cycle Engineers' Institute, a screw thread pattern, see British Standard Whitworth

== Other uses ==
- Chicago and Eastern Illinois Railroad
- Child exploitation imagery, a category of illegal or harmful online content
- Common Electrical I/O, interoperability agreements
- Comparably efficient interconnection
- Corporate Equality Index of US businesses regarding LGBT people
- IATA code for Chiang Rai International Airport, Thailand

== See also ==
- Cei (surname)
