= Ace1 =

Ace1, ACE-1, ace 1, or variation, may refer to:

- Angiotensin-converting enzyme 1 (ACE1)
- Samsung Galaxy Ace 1 (cellphone) 2011 smartphone
- Air Combat Emulator 1 (video game) (ACE 1), 1985
- ACE 1.x versions of ACE (compressed file format), the only freely available compression versions
- ancestral coatomer elements type 1 (ACE1), alpha solenoid type structural Nucleoporins

== See also ==
- Ace (disambiguation)
- Ace 2 (disambiguation)
- acel (disambiguation)
- acei (disambiguation)
- ACER1 (alkaline ceramidase 1)
