= Jill Gibson =

American singer, songwriter, photographer (born 1942)

- Born: June 18, 1942 (age 83); Los Angeles, California, U.S.
- Genres: Folk, pop, rock
- Occupations: Vocalist, songwriter, photographer, painter
- Instrument: Vocals
- Years active: 1962–present
- Label: Liberty Records Imperial Records Dunhill Records
- Website: gibsonarts.com

Jill Gibson (born June 18, 1942) is an American singer, songwriter, photographer, painter and sculptor. She is mostly known for her collaboration work with Jan & Dean and for having briefly been a member of the successful 1960s rock group the Mamas and the Papas. She was also one of the main photographers at the historic Monterey Pop Festival in 1967.

== Early life and education ==
Jill Gibson was born in Los Angeles, California on June 18, 1942. She is half-English. Gibson attended University High School in Los Angeles. She is a former model.

== Career ==
=== Association with Jan & Dean ===
Jill Gibson was studying at University High School in Los Angeles, California when she met Jan Berry of Jan & Dean fame in 1959. The two were an item for the next seven years. Together they wrote over a dozen songs and through Berry, Gibson got more involved with the music scene. Eventually she began composing songs with other known songwriters such as Don Altfeld, George Tipton and Roger Christian, a Los Angeles-based disc jockey who also wrote with Brian Wilson of The Beach Boys.

In 1962 Jan Berry decided to create a female answer to Jan & Dean called Judy & Jill, featuring Gibson with Dean Torrence's girlfriend Judy Lovejoy. Demo recordings such as "Come On Baby" (written by Gibson and Lovejoy), "Eleventh Minute" (written by Gibson and Altfeld), "Just For Tonight", and "Baby What's It Gonna Be" were cut and produced by Berry for Liberty Records. Gibson performed most of the leads on these unreleased demos. Nothing major happened with the Judy & Jill recordings, however, and Gibson switched to providing background vocals on several Jan & Dean album tracks. Meanwhile, she studied visual arts at the University of California at Los Angeles.

In 1963, Gibson appeared on the Jan & Dean track "Surf Route 101", and the next year she performed backing harmony on a song she wrote with Don and Horace Altfeld called "When It's Over" for a Jan & Dean album. She then recorded two vocal duets with Berry that she had written with Don Altfeld that year, "It's As Easy As 1,2,3" and "A Surfer's Dream". The tracks appeared on two different 1964 Jan & Dean albums.

In November 1963 ABC television aired a one-hour special called Celebrity Party hosted by Dick Clark and Donna Loren that included performances and/or appearances by Jill Gibson, Jan & Dean, The Beach Boys, Shelley Fabares, James Darren, Connie Francis, George Hamilton, Nancy Sinatra, The Challengers, Johnny Crawford, Deborah Walley, among others. It was sponsored by Dr Pepper.

Gibson released her first solo recording in 1964, a cover version of her own song "It's As Easy As 1,2,3" backed with "Jilly's Flip Side", written by P.F. Sloan with Steve Barri and issued on Imperial Records. Jan Berry produced and arranged both tracks. She also sang backup on Jan & Dean's hit "Ride the Wild Surf." Gibson co-wrote the B-side single "He Don't Love Me" for Shelley Fabares' More Teenage Triangle LP in 1964 with Berry.

In July 1965, a hit song Gibson had co-written with Berry and Roger Christian, called "You Really Know How to Hurt a Guy", peaked at number 27 for Jan & Dean on the Billboard Hot 100 singles chart.

By the time Gibson sang vocals on Jan & Dean's last studio album, Jan & Dean Meet Batman, in 1966, her personal relationship with Berry was ending; they had gone their separate ways by the album's March 1966 release but remained friends. Shortly after their breakup, Berry was involved in a serious motor-vehicle accident on April 12, 1966, which he survived. Gibson often visited in the hospital during his long, difficult recovery. Later Gibson dated Lou Adler, whom she had known since 1959 when he was the executive producer and manager of Jan Berry and Dean Torrence. Adler had recently separated from his wife, actress and singer Shelley Fabares.

"Eleventh Minute" was briefly released in 1997 as the B-side of a 45 rpm record on the Maltshop Records label. The licensed recording was soon withdrawn from sale (300 of the 500 red vinyl copies subsequently destroyed) due to questionable ownership of copyright and mechanical rights, as well as numerous label inaccuracies – most notably the performing artists are identified on the label of Maltshop 2 as "Jody & Jill". Furthermore, the A-side recording, "Come On Baby", was not the ballad demo offered to Liberty Records, but an up-tempo surf rocker by an unknown male singer and band.

On April 18, 2004, Jill Gibson was one of 400 invited guests who gathered at The Roxy Theatre in Hollywood, California, to celebrate Jan Berry's life and music at a tribute called "Jan Berry: A Celebration of Life". Other guests included Judy Lovejoy (her former singing partner), Dean Torrence, Don Altfeld (her former songwriting partner), Ann Marshall, Ryan O'Neal, Nancy Sinatra, Lou Adler, Lloyd Thaxton, Diane Rovell and Ginger Blake of The Honeys. The night featured live performances of Jan & Dean songs performed by artists who had once worked with Berry in the 1960s. The event had been planned by Berry's widow, Gertie, and Al Nassar.

In 2008, Jill Gibson recorded the duet ballad "When It's Over" with Cameron Michael Parkes for the Berry tribute album Encomium In Memoriam Vol. 1. The song "When It’s Over" was originally written and recorded by Gibson with Jan Berry in 1964 that was issued as the B-side of Jan & Dean's hit single "Sidewalk Surfin’."

=== The Mamas & the Papas ===
It was through Adler that Gibson met the rock group The Mamas & the Papas, a highly successful band Adler produced in the late 1960s. Occasionally, Gibson would visit Lou Adler in the studio while he was producing the band, who had just begun work on a new album. Gibson found herself in the right place at the right time when the leader of the group, John Phillips, fired his wife, Michelle Gilliam Phillips, from the band on Saturday, June 4, 1966, for having had an affair with Gene Clark of The Byrds. Instead of the group breaking up, they asked Jill Gibson to join The Mamas & the Papas as their newest member "Mama Jill". Shortly after joining the band, The Mamas & the Papas, along with Lou Adler, left for Europe for several weeks to begin working together.

Arriving in London, England, Gibson, Cass Elliot, John Phillips, Denny Doherty, and Lou Adler rented the top half of a large house in Berkeley Square to work in (the downstairs part was rented to Mick Jagger and model Chrissie Shrimpton). Over the next three weeks Gibson rehearsed with the group in London for the recording of the band's upcoming second album and for a few live shows. While in England, the band had a series of business meetings, but still made time to party with John Lennon, Paul McCartney, Keith Richards, Brian Jones, and Mick Jagger at Dolly's, the private London rock club that catered to the stars. Upon returning to the United States, the group, their manager Bobby Roberts, their attorney Abe Somer, and their label Dunhill Records officially fired Michelle Phillips on Tuesday, June 28, 1966. Jill Gibson was hired two weeks earlier, just before the band left for England.

Beginning in early July and continuing through part of August 1966, Gibson, Cass Elliot, Denny Doherty, John Phillips and Lou Adler recorded the band's second LP at Western Studios in Los Angeles, California with Bones Howe as the engineer. Fourteen tracks were recorded for the proposed second album, with twelve making the final cut. The first single "I Saw Her Again" was issued in late June but was recorded before Gibson was hired. The single peaked at number 5 on the Billboard Hot 100 on July 30, 1966, while Jill Gibson was a member of the band. The group had been in the middle of recording their sophomore album when Michelle Phillips was fired. Once Gibson was hired they re-recorded the songs and also recorded new tracks with her at Western Studios. It was decided the album would be called Crashon Screamon All Fall Down and was scheduled for a late August release. The American record-buying public had already ordered more than half a million advance copies of this album before it came out, and it was said to have been the most eagerly awaited record of that year.

Prior to Michelle Phillips having been fired, the band was photographed for the cover of their second LP inside the window frame of an abandoned house in the desert. That was soon changed by their label Dunhill Records, which asked the original photographer, Guy Webster, to photograph Jill Gibson alone in exactly the same pose as Michelle and then superimpose Gibson's image over Phillips'. The record label was not satisfied with the finished product and therefore ordered Webster to shoot a totally new album cover. Webster's new cover showed Gibson, John Phillips, Denny Doherty, and Cass Elliot with a fan, in a field of grass beside a white picket fence. The label was pleased with the new cover and it was used to promote the new LP in music trade papers, as well as on large billboards across the country.

A promotional campaign to introduce Gibson as the newest Mama soon followed, with articles in such publications as Newsweek magazine, which featured an article on the group referring to Gibson as "skeletal, modish, blonde and beautiful". Another article called "New Mama is definitely Jill" was published in Melody Maker, followed by a cover story on Gibson that was featured in KRLA Beat with the headline reading "Brand New Mama". The new Mama also made several television show appearances with The Mamas & The Papas to promote their latest single, "I Saw Her Again".

The Mamas & the Papas hit the road with Gibson for a few concert dates, beginning on July 1 in Dallas, Texas (the Dallas show was supposed to be on June 18 but was postponed until July 1) and ending in Phoenix, Arizona. Other dates included Forest Hills, New York and Denver, Colorado. Simon & Garfunkel opened for the band on some of these dates. According to Gibson, things had gone smoothly. The fans seemed to have accepted her, she was comfortable performing on stage with the group, and she enjoyed singing all of the songs in the band's 40-minute set. However, according to John Phillips and other sources, the chemistry within the group was not there with Gibson. In late August 1966, he decided it would be best to let Gibson go and to reinstate his wife Michelle Phillips. Michelle Phillips later admitted that Gibson had sung well and had done a very good job as a member of The Mamas & The Papas.

According to Jill Gibson, fans did not scream out for Mama Michelle during every live concert with her. It occurred only once, at a show in Forest Hills, New York, when a male fan shouted out, "Where's Michelle?" Billboard magazine, which reviewed the August 6, 1966 Forest Hills concert, said there were a number of hecklers in the audience.

Gibson was relieved to be free of the chaos that followed the supergroup, but she also felt betrayed by John Phillips. She had been told that her position in the group was permanent. The band and their label Dunhill Records gave Gibson an undisclosed lump sum for her three-month stint as Mama Jill. The album the group recorded with Gibson was pulled by the label to accommodate the return of Michelle Phillips. No copies of Crashon Screamon All Fall Down featuring Jill Gibson were officially released to the public, with only pre-release copies being circulated. The copies with Gibson are valuable collectibles today, and it is believed that anywhere from ten to twenty thousand were issued. The promo copies have the Crashon Screamon All Fall Down cover photo with the band and white picket fence.

With Michelle Phillips back in the mix, several tracks were re-recorded for the second album. The LP was renamed simply as The Mamas & the Papas and it hit the stores in September 1966, with Michelle Phillips' image on the cover. In 2002, Jill Gibson claimed that she recorded ten of the tracks for the second album, while Lou Adler claimed that same year she recorded only six of the songs, one being "Trip, Stumble and Fall". Session sheets of the recording dates note that Jill Gibson recorded seven songs. In 2006, Gibson said she still believed her voice remained on many of the songs. Michelle Phillips claimed she had no idea who sang on the album, while author Matthew Greenwald confirmed in his book that Jill Gibson recorded part of the LP and did, in fact, appear on several tracks on the final released version. The LP was certified Gold and peaked at number 4 on the Billboard 200 Albums Chart without Gibson receiving a Gold copy herself. A second single (not featuring Gibson), "Words of Love", was released from the LP and peaked at number 5 on the Billboard Hot 100 in late 1966. The third single "Dancing in the Street" also did not feature Gibson. The fourth and final single from the album was "Dancing Bear", featuring Gibson, and peaked at number 51 on the Billboard Hot 100. "Dancing Bear" was released in 1967, a year after it was recorded.

After having been ejected from The Mamas & the Papas, Gibson wrote the songs "I've Got a Feeling for Love" and "How Can I Be Down" with producer Gary Zekley for the psychedelic band The Yellow Balloon, and she performed background vocals for the band's one eponymous record. In 1966, she and Don Altfeld co-produced a cover version of the Bo Diddley song "Who Do You Love?" for the blues-rock group The Woolies.

In 2002, Gibson's past as a singing former Mama came briefly full circle when she recorded a cover version of "California Dreamin'" with San Francisco singer-guitarist Ace Andres for his Cowboy Hat Blues album. On that version of her former band's pop hit, the song was turned into a hard rock song.

=== Photographer ===
Around her time with the Mamas & the Papas, Gibson returned to photography, which she had begun to take seriously back in 1965 when she met photojournalist Ralph Gibson (no relation). During this same period, Gibson studied with Edmund Teske, a photographer working with the technique of solarization.

In June 1967 Gibson attended the first ever Monterey International Pop Festival with Lou Adler, where she was an invited member of the press. Over this three-day period in sunny Monterey, California, she photographed nearly every act on the bill, and her photographs of celebrities such as Jimi Hendrix, Janis Joplin, Jefferson Airplane, the Mamas & Papas, and Brian Jones have been published around the world. One of Gibson's photos of Jimi Hendrix made the front cover of Rolling Stone magazine. Gibson can be seen twice in the film version of this festival, Monterey Pop, by D.A. Pennebaker.

Jill Gibson took the photographs for the psychedelic rock group Fever Tree's self-titled debut album cover and its liner pictures for the band's 1968 LP released on Uni Records.

=== Painter ===
Gibson and Adler would break up as a couple in late 1967. After briefly dating Elmer Valentine, owner of the Whisky a Go Go in Los Angeles, Gibson went to New York City to study art at the Art Student's League with classical artist Frank Mason. After two years there, and a short stint in New Mexico, she left for Florence, Italy in 1970. For the next five and a half years Gibson painted while living in the Tuscan hills, studying briefly at The Simi Studio in Florence before returning briefly to California in 1973. On that return visit Jill Gibson made her American debut as a painter where her art was showcased for the first time at the DeVorzon Gallery in Hollywood for a week, and such guests as Jack Nicholson, Roman Polanski, Lou Adler, and Michelle Phillips were in attendance. Lou Adler purchased an original Gibson painting for $450 at the time while Nicholson also purchased two originals.

Jill Gibson's developing style as an artist is influenced by her interest in Renaissance art, nature, and the feminine. Many of her original art works are in the private collections of Max Factor, Guy Webster, Michael Savage, Jack Nicholson, and a fifteen-foot photo montage in The Los Angeles Free Clinic. She has her own studio, Gibson Artworks, in Marin County, California.

== Personal life ==
In 1975, she gave birth to a son, Mattia Borrani, who followed his mother's pursuit of a career in music and is the lead singer and rhythm guitarist for the indie rock group Oslo.
