= Cei =

Cei is a surname, and may refer to:

- Giuseppe Cei (1889–1911), Italian aviation pioneer
- Giuseppe Cei (bishop) (1640–1704), Roman Catholic prelate
- Idilio Cei (1937–1996), Italian football goalkeeper
- Luca Cei (born 1975), Italian racing cyclist
- Pina Cei (1904–2000), Italian stage, film and television actress

== See also ==
- CEI (disambiguation)
- Kay (Arthurian legend), a fictional knight whose name is also spelt Cei.
