= Acel (surname) =

Acel or Acél is a surname. Notable people with the surname include:

- Ervin Acel (1888–1958), Hungarian-born American Olympic fencer
- Ervin Acél (1935–2006), Romanian conductor
