= AMAN (naval exercise) =

Exercise hosted by the Pakistan Navy

- Native name: امن
- Date: March 2007 – present
- Location: Arabian Sea
- Also known as: Peace exercise
- Type: Naval exercise
- Theme: Together For Peace
- Motive: Promote image of Pakistan; maintain peace and stability; improve relations with allied navies
- Organized by: Pakistan Navy
- Participants: multinational
- Website: aman.paknavy.gov.pk

AMAN (Urdu: امن, 'Peace') is a series of multilateral naval exercises hosted by the Pakistan Navy, with amiable regional and international navies to improve communication and cooperation. The biennial event includes professional exercises and seminars, social events, and sports matches between participating nations.

One of the Pakistan Navy's biggest events, the exercise is performed every two years to demonstrate its commitment to making waters safe for the benefit of human activity, while at the same time inviting navies from inside and outside the area.

== Exercise objectives ==
The exercise is planned with focused objectives that include:

- Promoting Pakistan's image as a nation that helps to maintain peace and stability in the region.
- Strengthening the Pakistan Navy's standing in the local maritime industry.
- Improving communication between regional and extra regional fleets, serving as a link between them.
- Demonstrating Pakistan's shared will to combat maritime crimes and terrorism.

== Editions ==
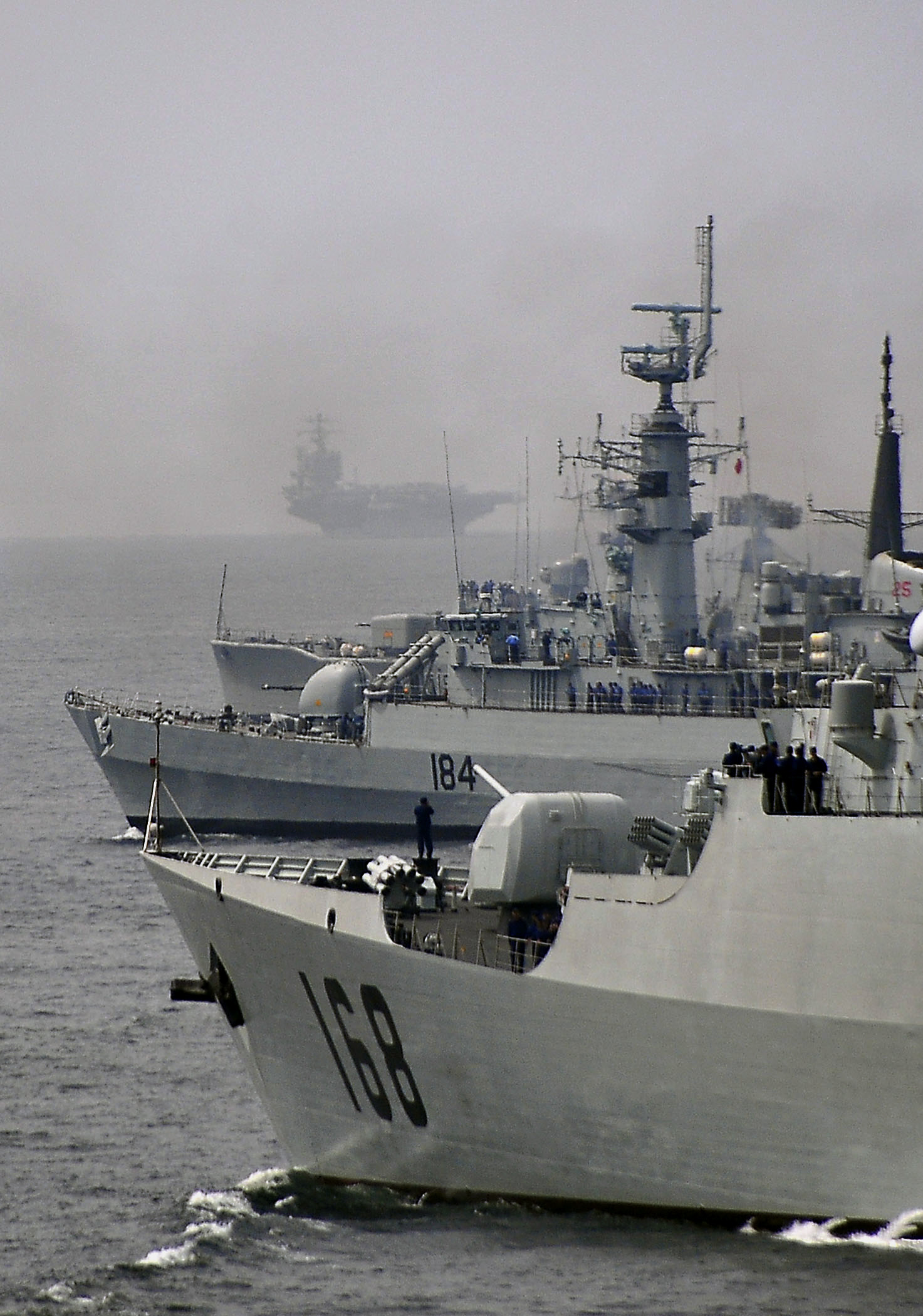
People's Liberation Army Navy destroyer Guangzhou (168), Pakistan Navy frigate PNS Badr (D-184), and an unidentified third vessel during AMAN-09. United States Navy aircraft carrier USS Theodore Roosevelt (CVN-71) is visible in the distance.

AMAN was first held in March 2007. Since then, the event has been held biennially except for 2015.

=== AMAN-07 ===
The first exercise, AMAN-07, took place in March 2007. 28 nations took part with naval assets and 29 observers, while 14 ships each from China, the United Kingdom, Italy, France, Malaysia, and Bangladesh attended the exercise. Special operations forces (SOF) and explosive ordinance disposal (EOD) units from Bangladesh, the United States, and Turkey also took part.

=== AMAN-09 ===
The second AMAN series exercise took place in March 2009. 34 observers and 24 nations participated in the exercise, which included 14 ships from China, the United States, the United Kingdom, France, Malaysia, Australia, and Bangladesh, as well as two P-3C Orion aircraft from Japan. SOF and EOD units from China, the United States, Turkey, Nigeria, and Bangladesh also took part in the exercise.

=== AMAN-11 ===
The third exercise in the AMAN series took place from March 2011. 28 nations participated in the exercise with 43 observers and naval assets. A total of 11 ships from Australia, China, France, Indonesia, Italy, Malaysia, Saudi Arabia, and the United States participated. During the exercise, three aircraft from Australia and Japan, as well as three marine, SOF, and EOD teams from China, Turkey and the United States took part.

=== AMAN-13 ===
AMAN-13, the fourth exercise in the AMAN series, took place 4 – 8 March 2013. A total of 29 countries participated in the exercise, which included 12 foreign ships, two Japanese P-3Cs, nine SOF and EOD teams, five senior officers from participating navies, and 36 observers.

=== AMAN-17 ===
AMAN-17 was carried out in February 2017, with 12 ships participating in the exercise. Participants included Australia, China, Indonesia, Russia, Sri Lanka, Turkey, the United Kingdom, and the United States. The exercise also included participation from two P-3Cs from Japan and ten SOF, EOD, and marine units from China, Indonesia, Malaysia, Maldives, Russia, Sri Lanka, Turkey, and the UK. 67 observers and 33 countries in total took part in the exercise.

=== AMAN-19 ===
Carried out in February 2019, 11 ships from Australia, China, Italy, Malaysia, Oman, Sri Lanka, Turkey, United Kingdom, and the United States participated in the exercise, along with one ship and two P-3C aircraft from Japan. Also taking part in the exercise were 15 SOF, EOD, and marine units from China, Indonesia, Italy, Malaysia, Nigeria, Poland, Sri Lanka, Turkey, the UK, and the U.S. In total, 115 observers and 46 nations took part in the exercise.

=== AMAN-21 ===
The Pakistan Navy conducted AMAN-21, the seventh in the Multinational Exercise AMAN series, from 11 to 16 February 2021. This exercise included participation from ships, planes, SOF, EOD, and marine units, and observers from 43 different nations' navies.

There were two phases to the exercise: a harbor phase and a sea phase. The flag hoisting ceremony, international maritime conference, seminars, roundtable discussions, ship-to-ship visits, call-ons, maritime anti-terrorism demonstration, and international band display were all included in the harbor phase. The operational plans and operations that were finalized during the harbor phase were put into practice during the sea phase.

=== AMAN-23 ===
On 10 February 2023, an opening ceremony for the joint exercise was held at the Pakistan Navy Dockyard in Karachi, and consisted of two phases: a harbor phase (10 – 12 February) and a sea phase (13 – 14 February). The participating fleets prepared for the five-day drills with seminars, operational debates, and professional demonstrations before engaging in tactical maneuver, anti-piracy, counterterrorism, search and rescue, live fire shooting, and air defense exercises.

The exercise, with the theme "Together for Peace", involved approximately 50 nations, including China, the United States, Saudi Arabia, Indonesia, Italy, Japan, Malaysia, Sri Lanka, Lebanon, France, Azerbaijan, Oman, Kuwait, Bangladesh, and several African Union countries, with ships, aircraft, SOF units, EOD units, and observers. Its purpose was to improve the participants' interoperability in the face of potential threats and instabilities in the Indian Ocean and to protect crucial international sea communication routes and the China–Pakistan Economic Corridor.

In addition, the National Institute of Maritime Affairs (NIMA) also organized the Pakistan International Maritime Exhibition and Conference (PIMEC). Admiral Niazi and Pakistan's foreign minister Bilawal Bhutto Zardari attended the PIMEC opening, which was a Pakistan Navy initiative to highlight the potential of the country's maritime industry to contribute to the growth of the country's blue economy.

=== AMAN-2025 ===
AMAN-2025, the ninth edition of the biennial exercise, took place from 7–11 February 2025 in two phases in Karachi, Pakistan, and the Arabian Sea. With the theme "Together for Peace", it marked the largest iteration to date, involving over 60 countries (up from 50 in 2023), including naval assets from China, Saudi Arabia, the United States, Japan, Türkiye, Russia, and African Union nations. The exercise emphasized collaborative maritime security and introduced the inaugural AMAN Dialogue, a strategic conference addressing global maritime challenges.

The first phase of the Harbor Phase lasted until February 9, showcasing conventions, exchange of views, operational presentations, international cultural events, and sports activities. In the Sea Phase, the second phase, scheduled for February 10 and 11, the exercise aimed at holding practical exercises, including anti-piracy and anti-terrorism exercises, search and rescue operations, international fleet review and live firing exercises.

== See also ==
- ACES Meet
- Pakistan military exercises
- Pakistan Marines
- Pakistan Naval Academy
- Special Service Group (Navy)
