= Acceleration (disambiguation) =

Acceleration, in physics, is the rate at which the velocity of a body changes over time.

Acceleration may also refer to:

- Acceleration (biology), the speeding up of some part of embryonic development, a form of heterochrony
- Acceleration (differential geometry), the rate of change of velocity of a curve with respect to a given linear connection
- Acceleration (human), in developmental biology
- Acceleration (law), a shortening of the time period in which something is to take place
- Academic acceleration, the rapid advancement of students
- Cardiotocographic acceleration, an apparent abrupt increase in fetal heart rate
- Vehicular acceleration, usually controlled by a throttle such as an accelerator pedal in a car
- The sensation of a change in speed
- Series acceleration, in mathematics, a sequence transformation for improving the rate of convergence of a series
- Acceleration (album)
- Acceleration (film), 2019 American action film
- Accelerations Waltz (1860) by Johann Strauß
- Uskorenie, a slogan used by Mikhail Gorbachev that translates to acceleration

== In systems thinking and social sciences ==
- Accelerating change, the exponential nature of the rate of technological change in recent history
- Accelerationism, critical and social theory
- Social acceleration

== See also ==
- Accelerate (disambiguation)
- Accelerator (disambiguation)
