= Deuce =

Deuce, Deuces, or The Deuce may refer to:

== Arts and entertainment ==
=== Fictional characters ===
- Deuce, in the Danger Girl comic book series
- Deuce, a character in Shake It Up
- Deuce, in the Wild Cards science fiction universe
- Deuce Bigalow, in Deuce Bigalow: Male Gigolo (1999) and Deuce Bigalow: European Gigolo (2005)
- Deuce Cooper, in the film Ed
- Deuce Loosely, in The Sifl and Olly Show
- Deuces, a gang in the film South Central

=== Gaming ===
- Deuce (dice), the side of a die showing 2
- Deuce (playing card), the playing card with the highest value in German card games
- Deuces (solitaire), a card game
- Deuces or Big two, a card game

=== Music ===
- Deuce (band), a British mid-1990s pop band

==== Albums ====
- Deuce (Rory Gallagher album), 1971
- Deuce (Kurtis Blow album), 1981
- Deuce (The D.O.C. album), 2003
- Deuce (Beautiful Creatures album), 2005
- Deuce (video), a video album by Korn, 2002
- Deuces (album), a 2007 album by Charlie Daniels
- The Deuce, a 2011 album by Stripper's Union

==== Songs ====
- "Deuce" (song), by Kiss, 1974
- "Deuce", a cover version by The 69 Eyes from the 1994 album Motor City Resurrection
- "Deuce", a song by The Cardigans from the 1998 soundtrack The X-Files: The Album
- "Deuces" (song), by Chris Brown featuring Tyga and Kevin McCall, 2010
- "Deuces", a 2008 song by Achozen
- "The Deuce", a song by Eagles of Death Metal from the 2015 album Zipper Down

=== Other uses in arts and entertainment ===
- Deuces (film), 2017 American crime drama written and directed by Jamal Hill
- Deuce (play), by Terrence McNally, 2007
- The Deuce (TV series), American period drama, 2017–2019

== Military ==
- Convair F-102 Delta Dagger, or Deuce, a 1950s American interceptor aircraft
- 502nd Infantry Regiment (United States), nicknamed The Deuce
- Marine Wing Headquarters Squadron 2, United States Marine Corps, nicknamed The Deuce
- Browning M2 (Ma Deuce) .50 heavy machine gun
- GMC CCKW 2½-ton 6×6 truck, nicknamed Deuce and a Half, or just Deuce.
- M35 series 2½-ton 6×6 cargo truck, Ditto, inherited its predecessor's nickname.

== People ==
- Deuce (nickname), including a list of people with the nickname
- Deuce (musician) (Aron Erlichman, born 1983), American music producer and rapper
- Deuce (wrestler) (James Wiley Smith Thomas Reiher Snuka, born 1971), American professional wrestler

== Places ==
- 42nd Street (Manhattan), New York City, nicknamed "the Deuce"
- Ann Arbor, Michigan, nicknamed "the Deuce"

== Sports ==
- "Deuce", a score of 40–40 in tennis
- "Deuce", a curveball, or a double play, in baseball

== Transportation and vehicles ==
- Deuce or FXSTD, a version of the Harley-Davidson Softail (FXST) motorcycle built 2000 to 2007
- Bakeng Deuce, a homebuilt airplane of the early 1970s
- Deuce Coupe, a version of the Ford Model B (1932)
- The Deuce (transit bus service), serving the Las Vegas metropolitan area

== Other uses ==
- English Electric DEUCE, a British commercial computer of the 1950s

== See also ==
- Duce (disambiguation)
