= Ervin Acél =

Ervin Acél is the name of:

- Ervin Acél (conductor) (1935–2006), Romanian conductor
- Ervin Acel (fencer) (1888–1958), Hungarian-born American Olympic fencer
