= Accelerate (disambiguation) =

To accelerate is to have acceleration: the rate of change of velocity of an object with respect to time.

Accelerate may also refer to:

== Music ==
- "Accelerate" (Christina Aguilera song), a song from her album Liberation (2018)
- Accelerate (Jump5 album), a 2003 pop album
- Accelerate (Peter Andre album), a 2010 pop album
- Accelerate (R.E.M. album), a 2008 alternative rock album; also the title track

== Other ==
- ACCELERATE, a leadership program for Indigenous creatives run by the Australia Council and British Council, 2009–2016
- Accelerate (horse), an American thoroughbred racehorse
- USS Accelerate (ARS-30), a salvage ship

== See also ==
- Accelerationen, Waltz by Strauss
- Acceleration (disambiguation)
- Accelerator (disambiguation)
