= SAP BI Accelerator =

In computing, the SAP BW Accelerator is a computer appliance - preinstalled software on predefined hardware - which is used to speed up OLAP queries. The software was initially known as the BI Accelerator.

SAP BW Accelerator includes indexes that are vertically inverted reproductions of all the data included in InfoCubes (i.e., fact and dimension tables as well as master data). Note that there is no relational or other database management systems in BW Accelerator. There is only a file system, and indexes are essentially held as flat files. The second primary component of SAP BW Accelerator is the engine that processes the queries in memory - it uses the SAP TREX search engine. The software is running on an expandable rack of blade servers. The operating system used for BW Accelerator is 64-bit SUSE Linux Enterprise Server (SLES).

== Hardware partners ==
The software is optimized for specific hardware and operating system combinations.

The list of partners which deliver the appliance is:

- IBM BW Accelerator solution
- HP
- Fujitsu Siemens Computers
- Sun BI Accelerator Offering
