= Sri Lanka Savings Bank =

Sri Lankan licensed specialised bank

- Industry: Bank
- Founded: 2006
- Headquarters: Sri Lanka
- Subsidiaries: National Savings Bank

Sri Lanka Savings Bank Limited is a Sri Lankan licensed specialised bank. It is a subsidiary of the parent organisation National Savings Bank.

== Corporate history ==
The Sri Lanka Savings Bank was established in July 2006 as a private limited company under the Banking Act No. 30 of 1988. It was incorporated under the provisions of the Companies Act. The bank obtained license to operate as a specialised bank from the Central Bank of Sri Lanka.

In October 2019, the National Savings Bank confirmed that it had officially taken over the Sri Lanka Savings Bank as a fully owned subsidiary. In March 2021, the ICRA Lanka Limited reaffirmed the credit rating of Sri Lanka Savings Bank to BBB− with immediate effect.

Sri Lanka Savings Bank generated a profit after tax amounting to Rs. 445 million for the financial year ending 31 December 2022. The bank recorded a significant increase in profit after tax by 74 percent from the previous financial year. The bank reported a profit after tax of Rs. 255 million for the financial year ending 31 December 2021.

In 2023, Dushayanta Basnayake was appointed as the chairman of the Sri Lanka Savings Bank. In 2023, according to a report by the Daily FT, Sarvodaya Development Finance had reportedly expressed keen interest in acquiring Sri Lanka Savings Bank, as the latter was deemed to be struggling with operational inefficiencies and financial instability. However, the reports about the potential acquisition of Sri Lanka Savings Bank by Sarvodaya Development Finance were brushed off by the Sri Lankan Savings Bank.

== See also ==
- List of banks in Sri Lanka
