= Duce (disambiguation) =

Duce is an Italian title.

Duce may also refer to:

- Benito Mussolini (1883–1945), Fascist Prime Minister of Italy during World War II, known as Il Duce ("the leader")
- Duce Chestnut (born 2002), American football player
- Duce Staley (born 1975), American former National Football League running back
- Adam Duce (born 1972), American heavy metal bass guitarist
- Robert Duce (born 1935), American chemist and professor
- Sharon Duce (born 1948), British actress
- Eldon Hoke (1958–1997), American drummer and singer nicknamed "El Duce"
- Duće, Croatia, a village
- Dar es Salaam University College of Education, Tanzania

== See also ==
- Deuce (disambiguation)
- Dulcie
