= Ace of aces =

Ace of aces is an informal title for the top pilot in a branch of military service. It also may refer to:

== Books ==
- Ace of Aces, the title of several biographies of Dick Bong
- Ace of Aces, the title of Teddy Suhren's memoirs
- Ace of Aces, the title of Rene Fonck's autobiography
- Ace of Aces, the title of a biography of Marmaduke Pattle
- Ace of Aces, the title of a biography of Eddie Rickenbacker

== Films ==
- Ace of Aces (1933 film), an American World War I film starring Richard Dix
- Ace of Aces (1982 film), a French-German comedy starring Jean-Paul Belmondo

== Games ==
- Ace of Aces (picture book game), based on World War I aerial warfare
- Ace of Aces (video game), a computer game based on World War II aerial warfare

== Other ==
- Ace of Aces (horse)

== See also ==
- Ace (disambiguation)
