= Ace the Dog =

Sandstone sculpture located in Warsaw, Poland

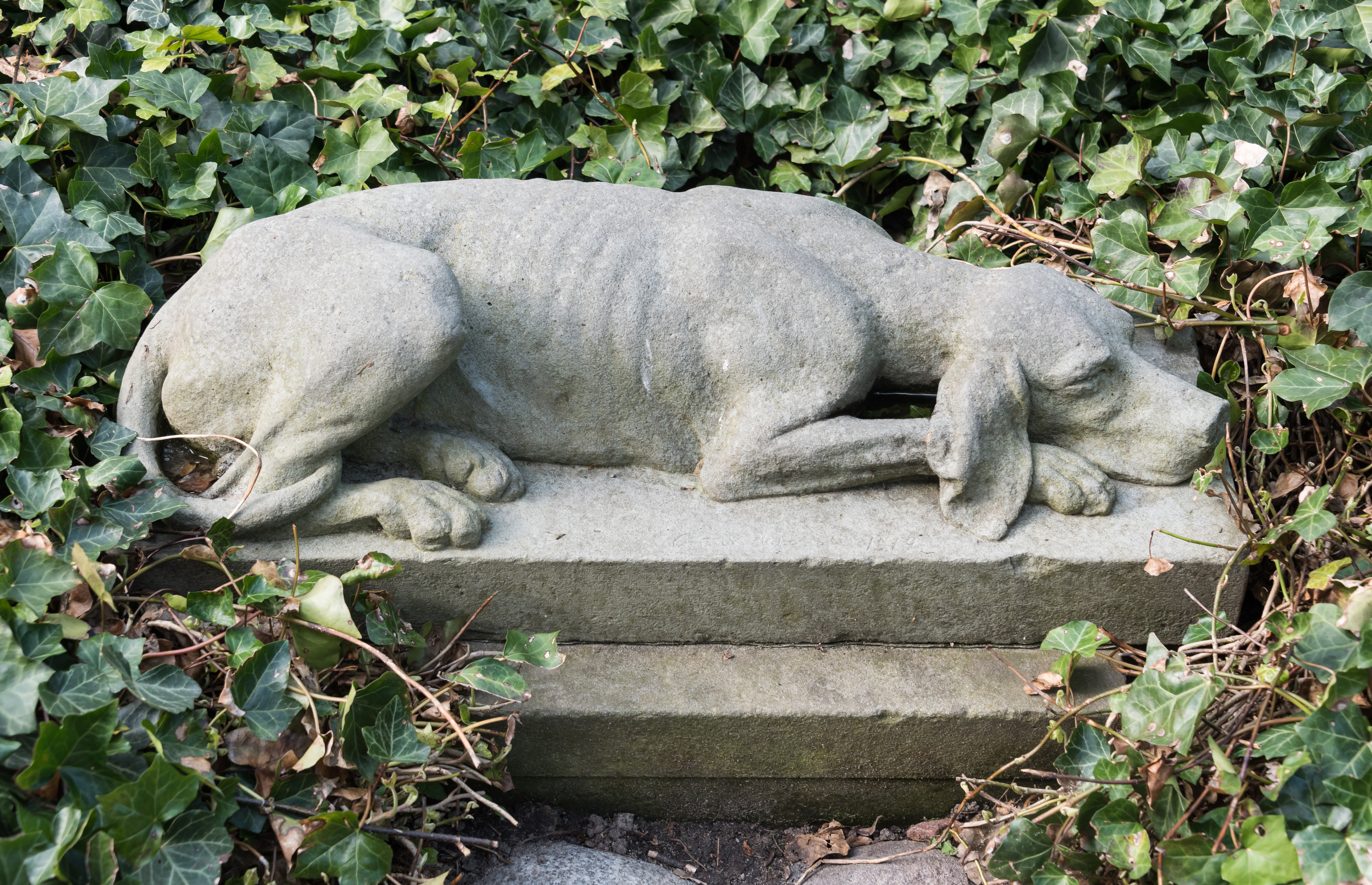
- The sculpture in 2021.
- Interactive map of Ace the Dog
- Location: Royal Baths Park, Warsaw, Poland
- Coordinates: 52°13′00.5088″N 21°01′50.2421″E
- Designer: Czesław Makowski
- Type: Statue
- Material: Sandstone
- Length: 87 cm (34 in)
- Width: 25 cm (9.8 in)
- Height: 33 cm (13 in)
- Completion date: 1919

Ace the Dog (Polish: Pies As) is a 1919 sandstone sculpture by Czesław Makowski. It is located in Warsaw, Poland, within the neighbourhood of Ujazdów in the Downtown district. The sculpture is placed in the Royal Baths Park, near the Old Orangery, in the location of the burial of guard dogs of the Royal Baths Museum. The sculpture depicts a fictional pointing dog Ace (Polish: As), a main character in the 1896 novel As by Adolf Dygasiński. It is a stone replica of a bronze sculpture by Makowski form 1903.

== History ==
The sculpture Ace the Dog was created in 1919 by Czesław Makowski. It is a stone replica of his 1903 bronze sculpture, which was part of the tombstone of Adolf Dygasiński at the Powązki Cemetery. Its name comes from the titular canine character of Dygasiński's 1896 novel As. The sculpture was placed in Royal Baths Park, near the Old Orangery, in the location of the burial of guard dogs of the Royal Baths Museum.

== Characteristics ==
The statue depicts a sleeping pointing dog. Its dimensions are 87 × 25 × 33 cm (34 × 9.8 × 13 in).

== Gallery ==
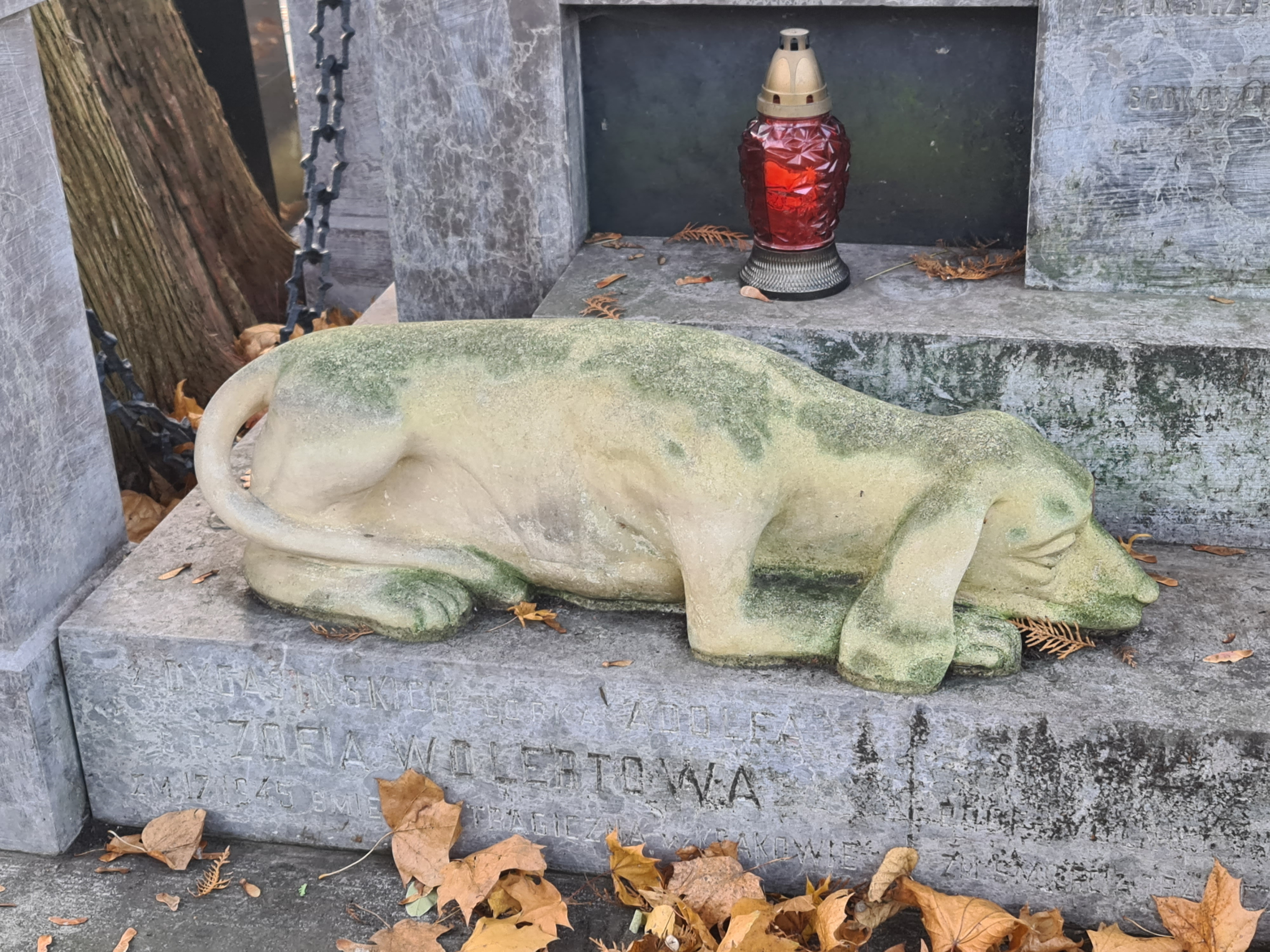
The original 1903 bronze sculpture by Czesław Makowski on the tombstone of Adolf Dygasiński at the Powązki Cemetery.
