= ACE TV =

Former community TV channel in Adelaide, South Australia

- Country: Australia
- Broadcast area: Adelaide

Programming
- Language(s): English
- Picture format: Analogue 4:3

Ownership
- Owner: Adelaide Community and Educational Television Incorporated

History
- Launched: May 1994; 30 years ago
- Closed: December 2002; 22 years ago
- Replaced by: Channel 44 (Adelaide)

Availability

Terrestrial
- Analogue: UHF 31

ACE TV was a free-to-air community television channel in Adelaide, South Australia which broadcast from May 1994 to December 2002. ACE TV was cancelled in 2002 due to breaching of licence conditions. The last ACE TV broadcast on-screen was in May 2002. ACE TV was superseded by C31 Adelaide, which was launched on 23 April 2004.

== Controversy ==
In 1994, the station courted controversy over its plans to air a documentary film, A Search for Truth in History. The Executive Council of Australian Jewry expressed its "strongest possible objection to having your station serve as a vehicle for the broadcast of what appears to be neo-Nazi propaganda.” The film, which featured Holocaust denier, David Irving was ultimately dropped by the station, saying that the film is "a denigration of the Holocaust" and that it would not air the film and risk the chance to "incite racial acrimony."
