= Sarvodaya Development Finance =

Sri Lankan finance company

Sarvodaya Development Finance PLC is a Sri Lankan public limited company and functions as a licensed finance company. It is a listed company in the Colombo Stock Exchange. It is considered as the first development finance company in Sri Lanka. It is also the financial services provider of the Sarvodaya Movement.

== Corporate history ==
The Sarvodaya Development Finance was incorporated on 1 January 2010 under the provision of Companies Act No. 07 of 2007. It received the license from the Monetary Board of the Central Bank of Sri Lanka under the Finance Business Act No. 42 of 2011. The company has set the core philosophy revolving around the principles of development finance, with a strong emphasis on community development projects and long-term investment opportunities. The company has inculcated an agriculture-based business model and follows the footprint of parent organisation Sarvodaya Movement. The profits generated by the Sarvodaya Development Finance are transferred to the Sarvodaya Movement and the Sarvodaya Movement redistributes the money to the wellbeing of rural and vulnerable communities by conducting various social development and poverty alleviation programs.

Sarvodaya Development Finance has also signed an exclusive memorandum of understanding with prominent local agricultural equipment suppliers, including Dimo and Hayleys, to facilitate domestic farmers gain access to modern farming equipment. In 2020, the company launched “Nena Diriya” Micro Leasing Loan scheme with the intention to uplift the education of children residing in rural and underdeveloped areas of Sri Lanka by providing laptops.

On 14 December 2021, the shares of Sarvodaya Development Finance began trading in the Colombo Stock Exchange following the successful implementation of company's Initial public offering. The company witnessed an oversubscription of its initial public offering on the first day of its offer. The company commenced its initial public offering by selling 30 percent stake of the company in order to raise 1 billion rupees. As of 2021, around 52 percent of the Sarvodaya Development Finance was owned by Sarvodaya Economic Enterprises Development Services (SEEDS) Limited, meanwhile 22 percent of SDF is owned by Sarvodaya Movement related entities and 12 percent of SDF's ownership is held by the Japanese Gentosha Total Asset Consulting Incorporation.

The total income generated by Sarvodaya Development Finance for the six-month period ending September 2022 eventually surpassed $1 billion. The company generated total income amounting to $1.18 billion for the six-month period ending September 2022, which turned out to be a massive leap for the company with a growth of 44.8 percent from September 2021.

In 2023, according to a report by the Daily FT, Sarvodaya Development Finance expressed its keen interest in acquiring Sri Lanka Savings Bank, as the latter was deemed to be struggling with operational inefficiencies and financial instability. However, the reports about the potential acquisition of Sri Lanka Savings Bank by Sarvodaya Development Finance were brushed off by the Sri Lankan Savings Bank in response to the Daily FT article.
