= Ace (book) =

2020 non-fiction book by Angela Chan

Ace: What Asexuality Reveals About Desire, Society, and the Meaning of Sex
- Author: Angela Chen
- Publisher: Beacon Press
- Publication date: September 15, 2020
- ISBN: 978-0807013793

Ace: What Asexuality Reveals About Desire, Society, and the Meaning of Sex is a 2020 non-fiction book by journalist Angela Chen about asexuality.

== Summary ==
The book includes critical analyses on subjects such as compulsory sexuality, medicalisation of asexuality, and the asexual spectrum, interviews with aces (asexual people) from various backgrounds, and insights into Chen's own experiences as an asexual woman of color.

== Reception ==
The book was included in NPR's Best Books of 2020 list.

Kathleen McCallister of Library Journal noted the text's inclusion of interviews from diverse aces, including of aces of various genders, aces of color, and disabled aces, further describing chapters analyzing how stereotypes about race and disability can intersect with asexuality as the "most thought-provoking" elements of the text. The review concluded that the book was "most likely to appeal readers of any [sexual] orientation."

In contrast, Publishers Weekly commented that although the book would be relatable to asexual readers, it would likely have difficulty being understood by allosexual (non-asexual) readers, describing it as "well-intentioned yet muddled."

Sarah Neilson of The Washington Post dubbed the book "a fantastic starting point for dismantling harmful sexual narratives and reimagining human connection as a broader, more equitable, enjoyable and free experience." In a review of the book also by Neilson on Them, Neilson noted how in addition to asexuality, the book covers "society, and society’s rules and norms and expectations around sex, sexuality, and all forms of relationships."

Ace was also reviewed in the Journal of Popular Romance Studies.

== In popular culture ==
Ace appears in the 2022 TV series Heartstopper, where Isaac Henderson, an aromantic asexual high school boy, is shown reading the book during the final episode of the second season.
