= Ace (1913 automobile) =

The Ace was a British car built between 1912 and 1916 in Burton upon Trent, Staffordshire. It was an 8 hp light car, with a 748 cc, four-cylinder water-cooled monobloc engine with Stethnos carburettor, it had a 2-speed gearbox and chain-drive built by the same manufacturer as the Salmon and Baguley cars, and sold for £100 to £125.

== Technical data ==
- 56 mm (2.2 in) x 76 mm (3.0 in) bore and stroke
- Kerb weight: 380 kg (838 lb)
- Wheelbase: 2,135 mm (84.1 in)
- Track: 1,143 mm (45.0 in)
- Length: 3,200 mm (126.0 in)
- Width: 1,270 mm (50.0 in)
- Tyre size: 700 x 65

Suspension was by ½-elliptic springs front and rear.
