= Akes, Georgia =

Unincorporated community in Georgia, U.S.

Coordinates: 33°58′02″N 85°19′05″W

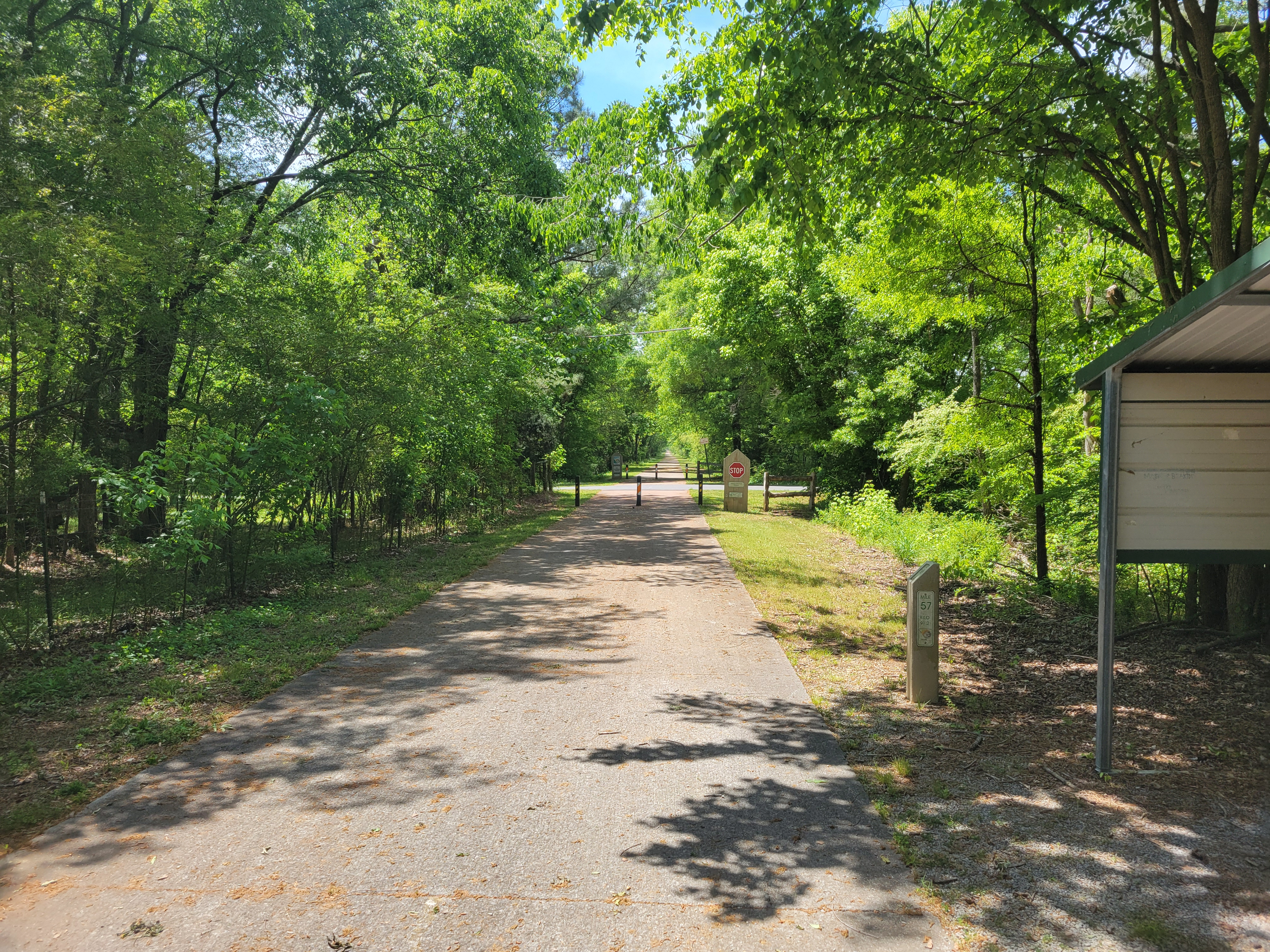
Silver Comet Trail at Akes Station Road

Akes is an unincorporated community in Polk County, in the U.S. state of Georgia.

== History ==
Variant names were "Akes Station" and "Berry". A post office called Berry was established in 1884, and remained in operation until 1912. In 1900, the community had 46 inhabitants.
