= Cameron Michael Parkes =

American composer

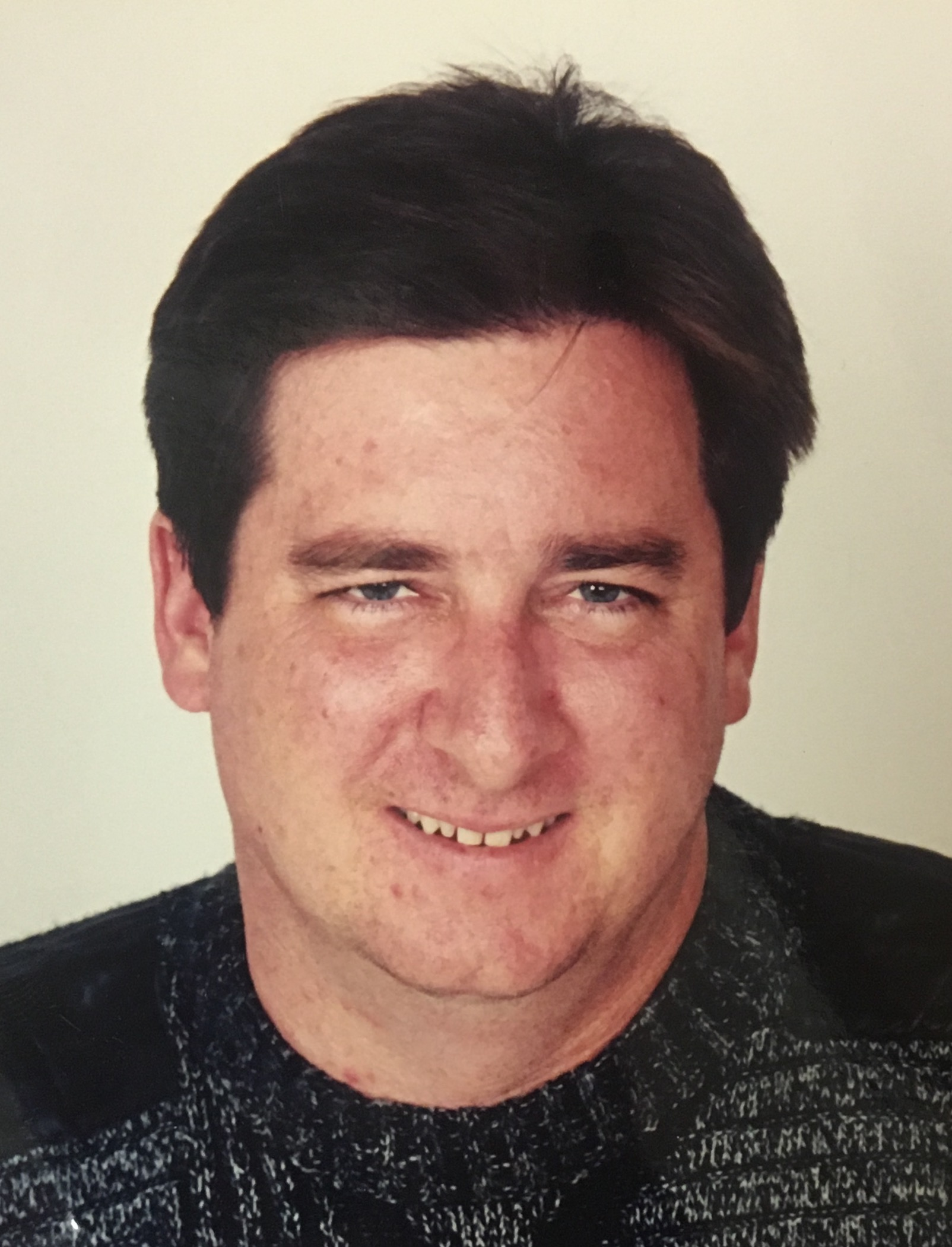
- Born: May 19, 1958 (age 68)
- Occupations: Composer, Lyricist, Musician, Orchestrator, Producer
- Writing career
- Subject: Music
- Website: www.boxoclox.com

Cameron Michael Parkes (born May 19, 1958) is an American composer known primarily for his work in Film and Television. He is a graduate of the film scoring program at UCLA and a member of ASCAP, S.C.L. (The Society of Composers and Lyricsts) and The Dramatist Guild.

== Awards ==
- Telly Award (2004)
- The Videography Awards (2004) - Best Use Of Music ("Baaba Maal" Title Song)
- ASCAP (Fred Karlin Award)

Parkes' concert works, "Gettysburg Address", "Mississippi River Reflections" and "Gershwinesque" (as well as two vocal selections from his score to the musical, Happy Birthday, Mr. President), received their national premieres in concerts broadcast as part of the "Sundays At Four" radio series. Parkes contributed both music and lyrics to the musicals Happy Birthday, Mr. President (about Marilyn Monroe) and Tanzi. The latter received the Drama-Logue Award for best musical of the 1984 Season. As a record producer, Parkes is best known for the 2004 release of the critically acclaimed "A Tribute To Brian Wilson" (Varèse Sarabande / Universal Music). In addition, Parkes is the founder of Cinecam Music Productions.

Parkes also collaborated with the late Jan Berry, as a vocal arranger and singer, on the Jan & Dean album Port to Paradise, released in 1986.

== Albums ==
- A Tribute to Brian Wilson – Varèse Sarabande (arranger, producer, and performer, 2004)
- Encomium In Memoriam Vol. 1 – Jan Berry Of Jan & Dean (arranger, producer, performer) 2008
- Maelstrom Beach with Box O' Clox – Cinecam (arranger, producer, performer) 2008
- The Quickening with Box O' Clox – Cinecam (arranger, producer, and performer, 2004)
- The String Quartet Tribute to Shania Twain – Vitamin Records (arranger and producer, 2004)
- The Little Witch of Wichita – (cast album, producer, 2002)

== Film ==
- Village Voices (2013)
- Ivy Roots (Short, 2008)
- Midnite Matinee (2007)
- Japanese Soup Torture (2007)
- Soiled Love (2007)
- Nerve Endings (Short, 2006)
- The Tulpa (Short, 2005)
- My Bad Dad (2004)- (co-contributor)
- Blind Sight (Feature, 2001)
- Hijinx (Feature, 2001)
- No Dialogue (Short)
- The Far Corner (Feature)

== Television (partial list) ==
- "Famous" Various Cues (Biography Channel)
- "Jan & Dean: The Other Beach Boys" (A&E Television Networks, Biography, 2002)
- The Killer Within (PBS)
- Teachers Only (ABC pilot, American Broadcasting Company)
- The Global Challenge (cable)
- Diseases in Children (CNBC)
- Barbara's POV (cable)
- The Accidental Host (2021) (PBS)
- Composer for SCORE KEEPERS & PRIMETIME MUSIC LIBRARIES (Discovery Channel, A&E, History Channel Etc...)

== Theater ==
- Happy Birthday Mr. President (music, lyrics, and book / additional lyrics and book by Paul Levine) Leo S. Bing Theater (1997), Barnsdall Theater (1998), New American Renegade Theater (1999).
- Tanzi (contributed music) – Drama-Logue's Best Musical Award – 1984 Season—Cast Theater (1983), Roxy Theater (1984)
- A Far better Place (music, lyrics, and book)
- Bah! Humbug! (music, lyrics, and book)

== Concert music ==
- "Mississippi River Reflections" for Orchestra, Premiere: November 27, 1992, SUNDAYS AT FOUR broadcast(KUSC).
- "Gettysburg Address" for Speaker & Orchestra, Premiere: November 27, 1992, SUNDAYS AT FOUR broadcast (KUSC).
- "The Unknown Soldier" (for French Horns and Trunpets) (1993)
- "Gershwinesque" Premiere: June 23, 1991, SUNDAYS AT FOUR broadcast (KUSC).
- Happy Birthday, Mr. President (Two Vocal Selections from The Musical)

Premiere: December 12, 1996, SUNDAYS AT FOUR broadcast (KUSC).

- "Our Eagle Flies Free" for orchestra (2026)

== Miscellaneous ==
- Brian Wilson (reissue) Warner Bros. Records / Rhino Archives – credit in liner notes
- Ennio Morricone Film Music Anthology (BMG/VIRGIN) / Consultant – credit in liner notes
- KABC Talk Radio (theme music)
