= Giuseppe Cei =

Italian aviation pioneer

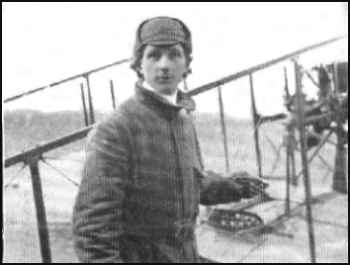
Giuseppe Cei

Giuseppe Cei (January 25, 1889 – March 28, 1911) was an Italian aviation pioneer.

He was born in Càscina, Tuscany, and showed a precocious talent for mechanics from a very early age. He also obtained good results as a fencer, winning the sabre prize in the International Contest held at Milan in 1908.

In late 1909, he moved to Paris, France. He studied in the Roche School for Aeronautics and Mechanic Constructions, graduating in engineering. In the same period he started to fly planes at the Issy-les-Moulineaux airfield.

On January 1, 1911 he received the 35th piloting license in Italy. Later his aerobatic performances in Paris, riding a Farman biplane, led the French President Armand Fallières to declare him Le roi de l'air ("The King of the Air").

Cei died on March 28 of that year when his plane crashed on Rotschild Island near Puteaux. His funeral was attended by a large crowd in Paris. Later his body was buried in his native city.
