= Advancing Chemistry by Enhancing Learning in the Laboratory =

Advancing Chemistry by Enhancing Learning in the Laboratory (ACELL) is a project for improving the teaching of Chemistry in the laboratory.

== History ==
The ACELL project began as APCELL (Australian Physical Chemistry Enhanced Laboratory Learning) in the late 1990s. Initially funded by the Australian Government through its Committee for University Teaching and Staff Development (CUTSD) program, the aim of APCELL was to build a database of tested, educationally sound undergraduate-level experiments in physical chemistry. APCELL ran several workshops at which experiments were tested at Australian universities by staff and students.

To be accepted into the APCELL database, an experiment had to be tested in a third-party laboratory (such as at a workshop), be judged to be educationally sound, and complete a peer review process. The educational analyses of experiments that completed this process were published in the Australian Journal of Education in Chemistry.

Additional funding was received from the Department of Education, Science and Training (Australia) through its Higher Education Innovation Program (HEIP) to enable the project to be extended to all areas of chemistry, which is the reason for the name change from APCELL to ACELL.

While the ACELL project is run with the active support of its many contributors, the management team is spread across four universities: Macquarie University, the University of Adelaide, the University of Sydney, and Curtin University of Technology.

In February 2006, ACELL ran a workshop hosted by the University of Sydney. This 3-day workshop was attended by 33 staff delegates and 31 students from 27 universities around Australia and New Zealand.

At this workshop staff and students reviewed 33 experiments submitted by the different participating universities. After completing the activities, debrief sessions were held in the evenings. All those who completed experiments also completed surveys on the experiment and the documentation behind it.

Another (smaller) workshop was run in February 2007 as a satellite activity of the Royal Australian Chemical Institute (RACI) Joint Organic and Physical Chemistry Division Conference OPC07.

== See also ==
- Royal Australian Chemical Institute (RACI)
- Computational chemistry
