= Accel Animation Studios =

Indian animation studio

- Industry: Digital animation
- Founded: 2006
- Parent: Accel Transmatic Limited
- Website: Official website

Accel Animation Studios is an Indian animation studio that provides 2D, 3D animation, visual effects and gaming services to companies in India and overseas. It is a division of Chennai-based technology services company, Accel Transmatic Limited and was formed in 2006.

== History ==
Accel Animation Studios was founded in 2006 in Chennai. It is a part of Accel Transmatic Limited and has facilities spanning across Chennai and Thiruvananthapuram. The company has over 80 animators working in its offices in Thiruvananthapuram. In 2013, Accel Animation set up its subsidiary in Kerala called Mocap Studio.

== Locations ==
Accel Animation Studios has production facilities at two locations in India - Chennai and Trivandram. As of 2011, both the facilities enjoy promotional duty and tax exemptions as animation industry is considered a new venture by the government of India. The infrastructure includes a Windows-based computer cluster, quad-core workstations and high-speed connectivity using Cisco Catalyst 4500 'E' series switch. It also includes a 32 Camera Motion Capture System, on site audio recording and editing suite.

Outside India, the company has operations in California, United States.

== See also ==
- Technicolor India
