= USS Accelerate =

Salvage ship of the United States Navy

History

United States
- Name: USS Accelerate
- Builder: Kyle & Purdy, New York
- Launched: 1921
- Acquired: 2 April 1942
- Commissioned: 15 March 1945
- Stricken: 7 February 1947
- Fate: Sold as surplus, 1948; Deleted 1999

General characteristics
- Type: Salvage ship
- Displacement: 400 long tons (406 t)
- Length: 129 ft 6 in (39.47 m)
- Beam: 32 ft (9.8 m)
- Draft: 14 ft (4.3 m)
- Speed: 12 knots (22 km/h; 14 mph)
- Armament: 2 × 6-pounder (2.7 kg) guns

USS Accelerate (ARS-30) was a salvage ship in the service of the United States Navy.

It was originally built as the steam-propelled mooring tender Toteco by Kyle & Purdy, for International Petroleum. Either late in 1929 or early 1930, the vessel was renamed Walling.

== Service history ==
=== World War II, 1942–1946 ===
After the United States entered World War II, the Navy acquired her at New York City on 2 April 1942, classified her as a salvage vessel, ARS-30, on 11 April 1943, and simultaneously renamed her Accelerate. No conversion was deemed necessary to prepare it for Navy use. Between these last two events, it may have been used privately by the Merritt, Chapman, Scott Co. because the Navy accepted her back from the company on 5 September 1946.

Records on the ship's naval career are scarce and in some matters confusing, if not contradictory. It appears that Accelerate was assigned to the 3rd Naval District throughout her service in the Navy. It was apparently operated under contract with the Navy by the Merritt, Chapman, and Scott Co. in waters near New York City. Some evidence exists indicating that the salvage vessel was placed in commission on 15 March 1945, but, if so, no logs of its service have been found, and no record of her decommissioning has survived.

=== Disposal and sale ===
The Navy declared the vessel surplus in February 1946 and its name was stricken from the Navy List on 7 February 1947. On 28 August 1947, the ship was transferred to the War Shipping Administration of the United States Maritime Commission for disposal.

The ship was sold in 1948 to C. Pateras and G. Glyptis of Venezuela. Soon renamed Marigo, it served several owners under the Venezuelan flag, bearing the names Marigo and George. In the late 1970s, it was registered as George and owned by Maritima Venezolana de Navegacion, S.A.
