= Advanced Computerized Execution System =

NASDAQ subscription service

The Advanced Computerized Execution System (ACES) is a NASDAQ subscription service paid for by market makers that allows order-entry firms trading in Nasdaq Capital Market and Nasdaq global market stocks access to a market maker's internal trading system to route to them using the ACES "Pass-Through". The market maker then executes the order internally, and sends a confirmation and trade report back through ACES to the order entry firm.

ACES acts as an order-routing interface between a firm entering orders, of any security, and a market maker's order management system. ACES is a voluntary service for which market makers must register. Once officially registered, market makers can then authorize their order entry customers to send them an order flow. Securities are designed as specified for automatic execution.

ACES automatically sends the trade information to Automated Confirmation Transaction Service (ACT) for reporting.

Part of the evolution of ACES includes the elimination of the execution function in 1998 with the introduction of new order handling rules. These rules encouraged Nasdaq participants to manage their order file internally rather than on ACES. The choice to keep the 'E' in ACES was merely because the acronym was not complete without it.
