= Ace Andres =

American musician and political activist

- Ace Andres

Background information
- Born: June 22, 1958 (age 68)
- Origin: Stockton, California, U.S.
- Genres: Hard rock rockabilly
- Instrument: Danica Ibanez Jem7wh
- Years active: 1960–present
- Label: Urban Camo Music

Ace Andres (born June 22, 1958) is an American guitarist, songwriter, vocalist, and political activist. The Wave Magazine of Silicon Valley, referred to Ace Andres' music in its October 2005 issue as "fast, loud, unapologetically confrontational rock." The Wave Magazine went so far as to refer to Ace as a Guitar god. In a later issue (April 2006), The Wave Magazine would use Ace Andres as a synonym for a guitar virtuoso.

== Biography ==
He was born in Stockton, California to parents that were in the restaurant/nightclub business. Ace was born in the same hospital (Dameron Hospital) around the same time as singer Chris Isaak. Both would attend A.A.Stagg Highschool while living in North Stockton California. Chris was Ace's Highschool President.

In the summer of 1968, Ace Andres was introduced to politics. His neighbor was California congressman and House Majority Whip John J. McFall (D)CA. Ace worked in the congressman's re-election headquarters. In 1972 Ace became a volunteer team leader for the "George McGovern for President" campaign. Ace followed his brother's footsteps and enlisted in the Navy a year later towards the end of the Vietnam War. It was in the US Navy that Ace founded his first professional band, a power trio called Sky High (Kerry Henry/bass and Toby Woodard/drums) that performed in Japan in 1976.

After leaving the Navy with an honorable discharge in 1977, Ace returned to the San Francisco Bay Area and recorded his first single "Still Waiting" and "I can't love you no more".

In the late 1970s Ace met then presidential candidate and former actor Ronald Reagan. This had an effect on the musician that planted the seeds of conservatism in him. In 1980 he registered as a republican.

In 1995 Ace publicly confronted incumbent congressman William P. Baker (R)CA in a debate over "affirmative action legislation". Ace exposed congressman Baker's liberal viewpoint on affirmative action in a town hall meeting in Castro Valley, California which might have contributed to his defeat by the moderate "Ellen Tauscher (D)CA. The next day Ace was interviewed on the "Savage Nation" by best-selling author Michael Savage on the radio station KSFO.

In 2002 Ace recorded his first album, Cowboy Hat Blues which received warm reviews. Former female singer Jill Gibson recorded on the cover version of "California Dreamin'". Gibson was a member of the super group The Mamas and the Papas, the original group that recorded the song. Ace Andres and indie actress Parker Posey were the featured artists in the December 2002 issue of Preview magazine,(published by the Mediea News Group)

In 2003 Dave Kaffenetti of Spinal Tap joined Ace Andres as his only keyboardist. Kaffenetti was preceded by Tubes drummer Doug Friedman. Tom Bowers of Johnny and the Doorslammers has been Ace's long-time bassist.

In 2005 Ace would expose his political bias in the album American Infidel. The song "Talk Radio" would be used by conservative talk show hosts across the country as "bumper" music. In addition, the song "Save Me" (also bumper music) would reflect the pain the country went through at the time of Terri Schiavo's death. In 2007 Andres released the "Save Me" video that would share his pro-life POV. The video would be used by pro-life groups such as Abortion Clinic 911 and also by the Terri Schindler Schiavo Foundation.

In October 2008, Ace, in an interview with Lou Dobbs, was asked about the chance of Obama winning the election, Ace replied; "after 8 years of George Bush, any sock monkey with a jackass lapel pin should be able to win". October 2008 also brought Andres' 4th solo Album 7 Secret Vibrations.

In February 2009 Ace Andres' album 7 Secret Vibrations was featured on syndicated radio host Hugh Hewitt's KRLA show in front of a national audience.

In October 2010 Ace Andres appeared on Travel Channel's "No Reservations" featuring author and chef Anthony Bourdain.

== Discography ==
=== Singles ===
- I can't love you no more b/w Still Waiting (1978)
- A Terry Anderson Song (2004)

=== Albums ===
- Cowboy Hat Blues , Urban Camo Records (2002)
- Hunka Gyrations, Urban Camo Records (not available, 2004)
- American Infidel, Urban Camo Records (2005)
- 7 Secret Vibrations, Urban Camo Records (2008)

=== DVDs ===
- Ace Live ~ Stanford Research Institute (2003)
- The Hard Rock Gourmet ~ pilot cooking show for The Food Network (2004)

=== Videos ===
- 7 Secret Vibrations (2008)
  1. "Rocket Of Desire ~ Attitude of Gratitude"
  2. "Ho' Oponpono"
  3. "7 Secret Habits, Music for clearing limiting beliefs"
- Ace Live (2003)
  1. "Bad Woman"
  2. "OH Well"
  3. "2 A.M. in Texas"
- American Infidel (2005)
  1. "Save Me"
  2. "California Sun"
  3. "Road Runner"
  4. "I NEED A BEER"
  5. "Sleep Walk"
  6. "Lucille"
- Hunka Gyrations (2004)
  1. "Viva Las Vegas"
  2. "Crying"
  3. "Not Fade Away"
  4. "Come On Let's Go"
- Cowboy Hat Blues (2002)
  1. "Can't Stop Lookin'"
- Miscellaneous
  1. "A Terry Anderson Song"
  2. "Ubangi Stonp"
