= Accelerator (library) =

Accelerator is a data parallel library being developed by Microsoft Research. It allows data parallel programs to be written that run on the GPU. It utilizes the DirectX runtime and shader programs to communicate with the GPU. The public API of the library is exposed using managed code.
