= Automatic content extraction =

Automatic content extraction (ACE) is a research program for developing advanced information extraction technologies convened by the NIST from 1999 to 2008, succeeding MUC and preceding Text Analysis Conference.

== Topics and exercises ==
Given a text in natural language, the ACE challenge is to detect:

1. entities mentioned in the text, such as: persons, organizations, locations, facilities, weapons, vehicles, and geo-political entities.
2. relations between entities, such as: person A is the manager of company B.
3. events mentioned in the text, such as: interaction, movement, transfer, creation and destruction.

The program relates to English, Arabic and Chinese texts.

The ACE corpus is one of the standard benchmarks for testing new information extraction algorithms.
