= ACES Meet =

International air exercise

- Type: Air force exercise
- Planned by: Pakistan Air Force
- Objective: Enhance combat readiness, provide realistic training in air combat and counter-terrorism operations
- Date: October 2017 – present

ACES Meet is an international air exercise hosted and organised by the Pakistan Air Force, which aims to improve the combat preparedness of air forces by providing them with realistic training in air combat and counterterrorism operations. Participants in the exercise include contingents from several air forces throughout the world, including combat pilots and ground support troops with their fighter aircraft.

== Background ==
During ACES Meet, air forces from many nations may share knowledge and expertise in counterterrorism operations, improving their operational readiness and fighting capability. The exercise strengthens the links of comradeship and professional competence among the participating air forces by encouraging friendship and collaboration.

== ACES Meet-2017 ==
With participation from the Turkish Air Force and the Royal Saudi Air Force, the first ACES Meet-2017 sought to mimic modern air combat strategies while leveraging contemporary training aids.

== ACES Meet 2021-2 ==
ACES Meet 2021–2, in which the Pakistani and Turkish air forces actively engaged while the British and Uzbek air forces watched from the sidelines.

== See also ==
- AMAN (naval exercise)
