= ACE Freighters =

British cargo airline

- Founded: 1964
- Commenced operations: 1 March 1964
- Ceased operations: 23 September 1966
- Hubs: London Gatwick Airport
- Subsidiaries: ACE Scotland
- Fleet size: 5

ACE Freighters Ltd., registered trading name of Aviation Charter Enterprises Ltd., was a British cargo airline from 1964 to 1966.

== History ==
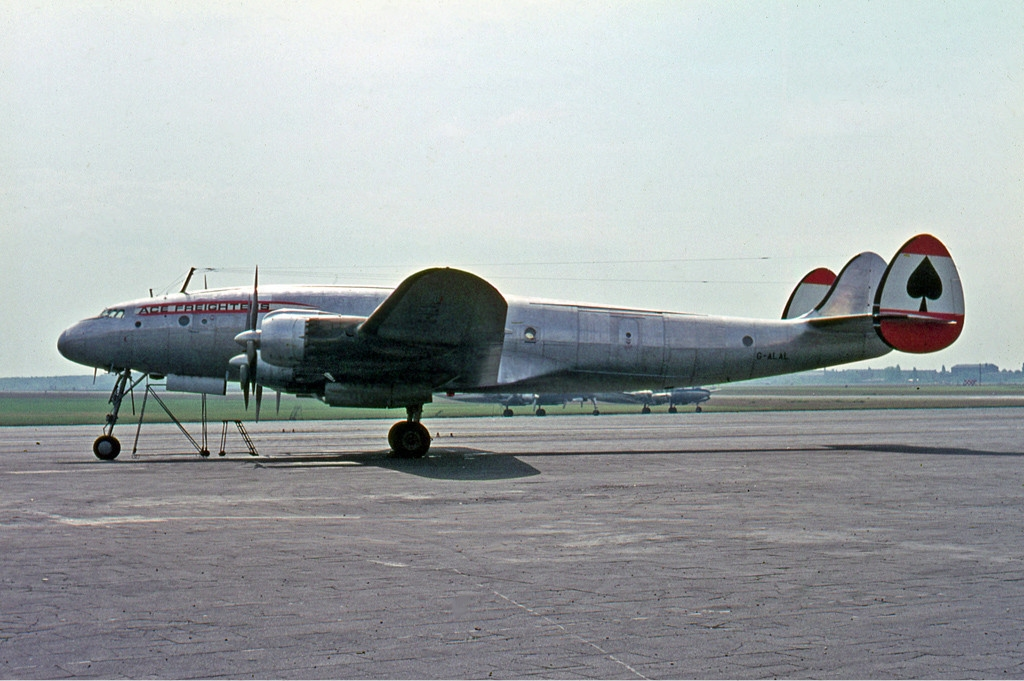
ACE Freighters, Lockheed L-749A Constellation, G-ALAL.

The airline was established in September 1962 and started operations during March 1964 with one Lockheed Constellation. and three more were acquired in August 1965. The airline was awarded an "E" Licence in January 1964 to carry out non-scheduled all-freight operations from the UKs Air Transport Licensing Board (ATLB). An application in February 1965 for permission to operate scheduled all-cargo services on a London-Middle East-Far East-Australia route was rejected by the ATLB in May 1965.

ACE carried out worldwide ad hoc charters from London Gatwick Airport. During 1965 some sub-charter freight flights were flown within Europe for British European Airways. A large number of regular charters were operated on British Ministry of Defence of contracts to the Middle and Far East. Routes flown were particularly RAF Lyneham to Malta, Cyprus, RAF El Adem (Libya) and onwards to Singapore. After leasing a Douglas DC-4, this was bought and another DC-4 acquired.

During the 1966 UK docks strike many freight charters were flown from Southend and Gatwick to Amsterdam, Paris and Rotterdam. In May 1966, for example, G-ALAL flew up to five return flights a day from Southend to Rotterdam. Freight charters were operated into Heathrow for Aer Lingus, Swissair and United Arab Airlines.

On 16 September 1966 all operations were halted. and on 23 September, the airline was placed in liquidation after having run up large debts for fuel, and the aircraft fleet was stored until sold.

== ACE Scotland ==
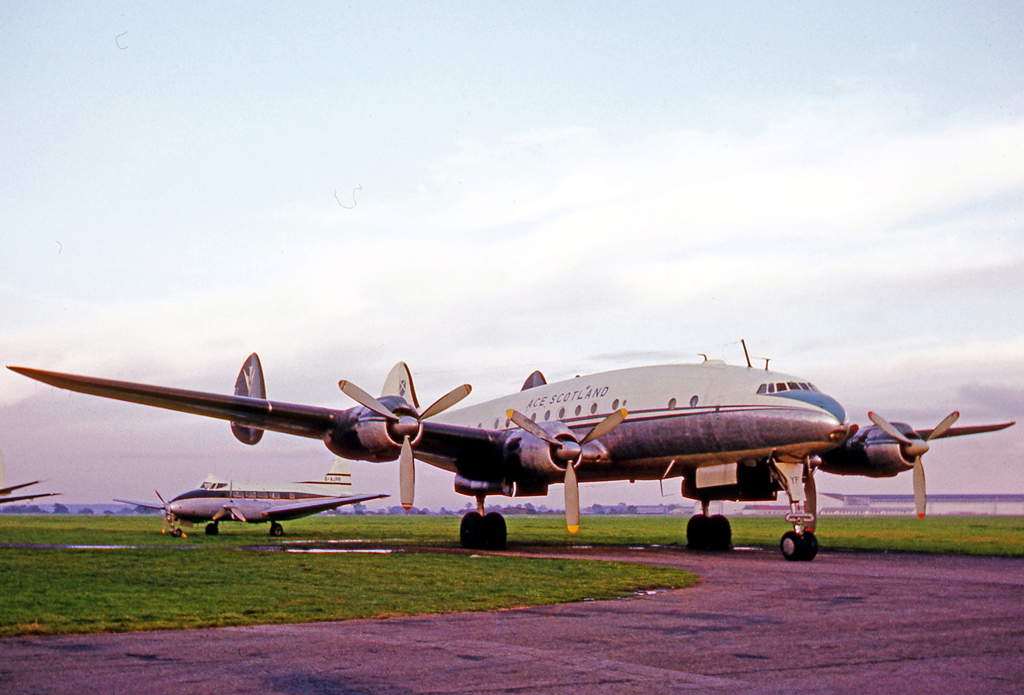
ACE Scotland's only aircraft Lockheed L-749A Constellation G-ASYF at Coventry Airport in 1966

In December 1965 a subsidiary company, Aviation Charter Enterprises (Scotland) Ltd., trading as ACE Scotland, was formed. Revenue earning operations commenced on 16 July 1966 with an inclusive tour holiday flight from the ACE Scotland base at Abbotsinch Glasgow to Barcelona and Palma. The airline was equipped with one ex-South African Airways L-749A Constellation. Thereafter regular flights were made from Glasgow to other European destinations including Rome and other flights were made from Gatwick. Ad hoc charter flights took the Constellation to Athens, Jeddah and Tours.

The airline was forced to cease operations on 23 September 1966 in parallel with the liquidation of the parent company. The last commercial passenger service was flown on 10 September 1966 from Palma to Abbotsinch, followed by the last freight charter from Gatwick to Düsseldorf and Heathrow on 11 September 1966.

== Fleet ==
- Douglas DC-4
- Lockheed Constellation model L-749A

== See also ==
- List of defunct airlines of the United Kingdom
