= Comparably efficient interconnection =

Equal-access concept in telecommunications

In telecommunications, a comparably efficient interconnection (CEI) is an equal-access concept developed by the FCC stating that, "...if a carrier offers an enhanced service, it should be required to offer network interconnection (or colocation) opportunities to others that are comparably efficient to the interconnection that its enhanced service enjoys. Accordingly, a carrier would be required to implement CEI only as it introduces new enhanced services."
