= Clean Energy Institute =

Research institute at the University of Washington

Coordinates: 47°39′15.8″N 122°18′35.4″W

- Type: Research Institute
- Established: 2013
- Director: Daniel T. Schwartz
- Location: Seattle, Washington, US
- Website: Official website

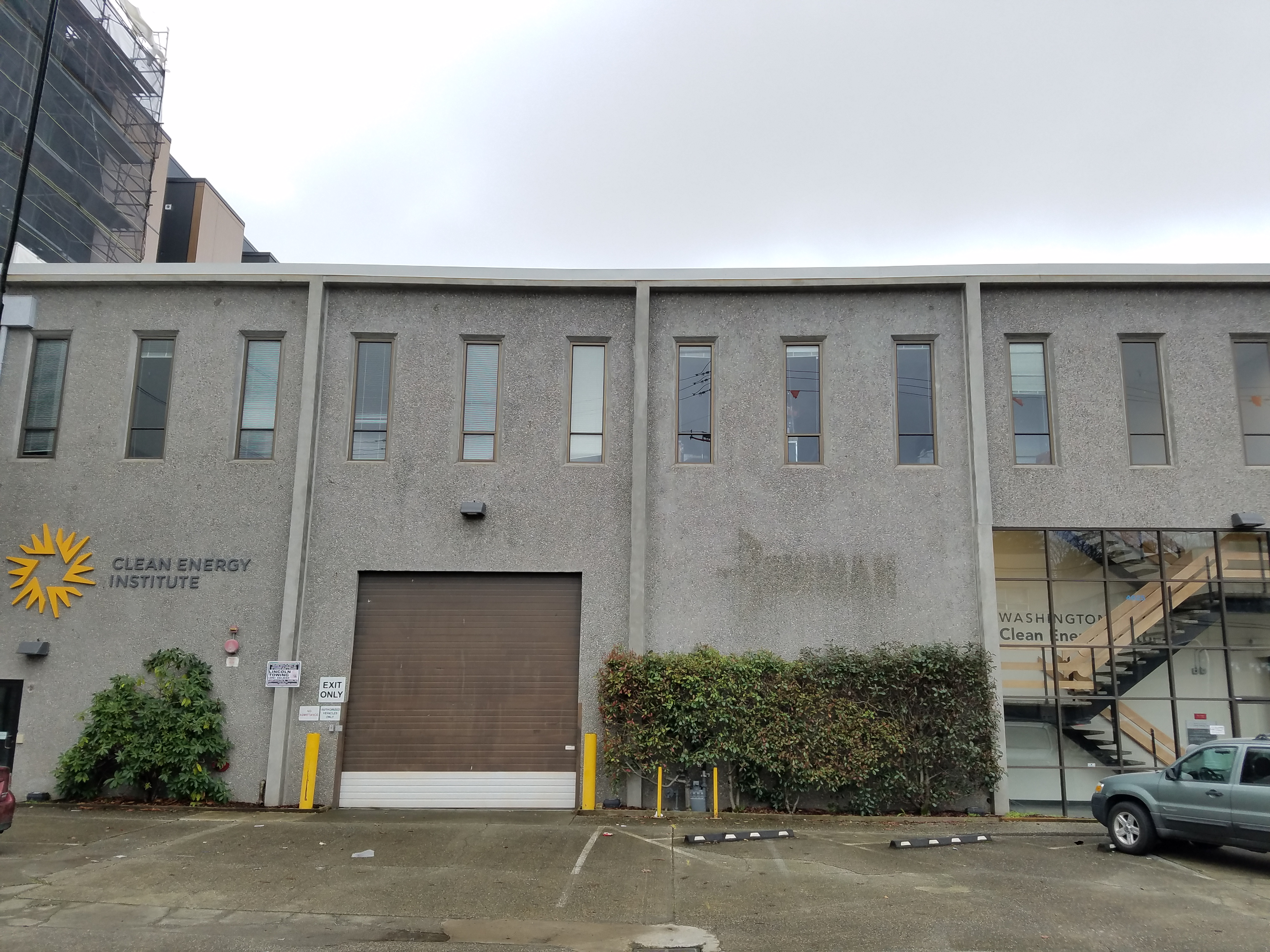
Washington Clean Energy Testbeds, the institute's main research facility

The Clean Energy Institute (CEI) is a research institute at the University of Washington. Founded in 2013, the institute maintains several facilities across the university's Seattle campus and supports renewable energy technology research, education, entrepreneurship, and outreach. The institute is under the direction of Daniel T. Schwartz.

== History and operations ==
The Clean Energy Institute is based in the Molecular Engineering and Sciences building at the University of Washington's Seattle campus. It was founded in 2013 with a $6 million grant from the state of Washington for the purposes of supporting solar power and energy storage research and development. This includes research projects led by the university's own academic labs, private companies, and the government.

The institute's primary research facility is the Washington Clean Energy Testbeds (WCET), which opened in 2017 and was funded by an additional $8 million state grant approved by governor Jay Inslee. Located next to University Village near the main campus, the 15,000 square foot (1,400 m^{2}) facility allows both academic and private sector users to rent lab space, utilize testing equipment, and consult staff for assistance in their research projects. Equipment at the WCET include battery device testers, solar simulators and solar cell testers, a systems integration lab where users can test devices under real-time or simulated power grids to evaluate energy generation and storage strategies, and a roll-to-roll printer which GeekWire described as "one of the most advanced roll-to-roll systems in the world."

The institute also maintains the Research Training Testbed, which is located in the Nanoengineering and Sciences Building on the university's main campus.

== Research ==
The Clean Energy Institute's main research areas include battery and solar photovoltaic technology as well as grid management. The institute has supported projects relating to perovskites, which have often focused on improving the material properties of thin-film perovskite cells as well as exploring the use of high-throughput manufacturing processes for producing such devices.

== Future expansion ==
In 2018, the state of Washington allocated $20 million to construct a new 340,000 square foot (32,000 m^{2}) building on the west side of the UW's Seattle campus called the Center for Advanced Materials and Clean Energy Technologies (CAMCET). The CAMCET building will ultimately house the Clean Energy Institute and the Washington Clean Energy Testbeds as well as the Northwest Institute for Materials Physics, Chemistry, and Technology, and it will include lab and office space for research and collaboration. Construction is scheduled to begin in late 2020, and the building is expected to open by the year 2023.
