= Ace (gamer) =

American professional esports player (born 1993)

Personal information
- Name: Aaron Elam
- Born: April 2, 1993 (age 33); Florence, KY
- Nationality: American

Current team
- Team: TeamMETA
- Game: Halo

Career information
- Playing career: 2006–present

Team history
- 2006–2008: Various Teams
- 2008: Breaking Point
- 2009–2011, 2013: Status Quo
- 2012: Shady Halo Kids
- 2012: Dynasty
- 2013: Believe the Hype
- 2014: eXcellence Gaming
- 2014–2015: OpTic Gaming
- 2015–2016: Team Liquid
- 2016–2022: OpTic Gaming
- 2023-Present: TeamMETA

Aaron Elam (born April 2, 1993), known by his video game moniker Ace, is an American professional Halo player who currently plays for TeamMETA. Elam is best known for winning the Halo 4 Global Championship FFA after beating Justin "iGotUrPistola" Deese in the finals, where he won $200,000. He is well known for his time on team Status Quo and Team Liquid.

== Accolades ==
- Halo 4 Global Championship FFA

=== Team Liquid ===
- 5-8th - X Games Aspen 2016
