= Aces (river) =

Aces (Ancient Greek: Ἄκης), is a river of Asia, flowing through a plain surrounded by mountains, respecting which a story is told by Herodotus. Geographers are not agreed as to the locality. It seems to be somewhere in Central Asia, east of the Caspian. Geographers agree, however, that the Aces of Herodotus is not the Indian river Acesines (modern Chenab).
