= Typical (album) =

Live album by Peter Hammill
- Released: April 1999
- Recorded: 1992
- Genre: Art rock
- Length: 130:13
- Label: Fie! Records
- Producer: Peter Hammill

Peter Hammill chronology
This (1998)	Typical (1999)	None of the Above (2000)

Professional ratings
Review scores
Source	Rating
Allmusic	3/5 stars

Typical is a live album by Peter Hammill, recorded in 1992 and released in 1999. It is a double CD and was released on Hammill's own Fie! Records label. The album was recorded at nine concerts in Austria, Germany, the Netherlands and Italy.

"Afterwards", "Darkness (11/11)" and "Central Hotel" are hidden tracks within The Future Now song and are not mentioned on release.

== Track listing ==
All tracks are written by Peter Hammill, except where noted.

Disc one
No.	Title	Length
1.	"My Room"	7:30
2.	"Curtains"	6:06
3.	"Just Good Friends"	4:55
4.	"Too Many Of My Yesterdays"	4:23
5.	"Vision"	4:32
6.	"Time To Burn"	5:08
7.	"The Comet, The Course, The Tail"	9:12
8.	"I Will Find You"	3:55
9.	"Ophelia"	4:14
10.	"Given Time"	4:46
11.	"Modern"	9:30

Disc two
No.	Title	Writer(s)	Length
1.	"Time For A Change"	Chris Judge Smith, Steve Robshaw	4:14
2.	"Patient"		8:43
3.	"Stranger Still"		5:51
4.	"Our Oyster"		5:46
5.	"Shell"		4:44
6.	"A Way Out"		9:06
7.	"Traintime"		6:10
8.	"The Future Now"		4:17
9.	"The Future Now" ((silence))		1:58
10.	"The Future Now" (Afterwards)		6:42
11.	"The Future Now" (Darkness (11/11))		4:50
12.	"The Future Now" ((silence))		2:33
13.	"The Future Now" (Central Hotel)		6:12

== Personnel ==
- Peter Hammill – guitar, electric guitar, keyboards, vocals
- Paul Ridout – live mixing, mixing
