= Ervin Acel (fencer) =

American fencer

Personal information
- Full name: Erwin Starhemberg Acel
- Nationality: Hungarian-American
- Born: December 18, 1888 Kisvárda, Austria-Hungary
- Died: February 24, 1958 (aged 69) Poughkeepsie, New York, United States

Sport
- Country: USA
- Sport: Fencing
- Club: New York Athletic Club

Ervin Starhemberg Acel (December 18, 1888 – February 24, 1958) was a Hungarian-born American fencer. He competed in the team sabre event at the 1928 Summer Olympics.

Abel was born in Hungary and gained his PhD in law from the University of Berlin before moving to the US. After his sporting career, he became an authority on migrant worker law, wrote articles on Eastern European politics for The New York Times, and worked as a secretary for the Amateur Fencers League of America.
