= Association of Luxembourg Student Unions =

Roofing bond

- Motto: De Studentevertrieder
- Location: 2, avenue de l'Université L-4365 Esch-sur-Alzette
- Established: 1984
- President: Ann Bertemes
- Members: over 40 student unions
- Website: Internet site ACEL

The Association of Luxemburg Student Unions, (French: Association des cercles d'étudiants luxembourgeois) abr. ACEL, founded in 1984 is the roofing bond of Luxembourgish student unions and represents more than 40 student unions, all spread across Europe. Therefore, ACEL is representing more than 10000 Luxembourgish students. It is hence considered as the most important student representative in Luxemburg. ACEL is politically non-committed, it represents no party opinion. Claiming to be the representative of all Luxembourgish students, this is particularly important to function properly.

== Description ==
The major part of Luxembourgish Students study abroad, as the studies offered in Luxemburg are limited and do not cover all academic fields of study. This situation is unique and has several benefits, including the foundation of Luxembourgish Student Unions across various European cities. The student unions constitute the active members of ACEL, covering 9 countries; Austria, Belgium, France, Germany, Great Britain, Luxemburg, The Netherlands, Switzerland and the United States. These student unions receive and unite fellow Luxembourgish students during their academic studies. Besides ACEL counts 9 specific student unions among its members (Medicine, Economics, Law, Psychology, Literature, Engineering, History, Communication and BTS students ).

Since its foundation, ACEL has defined its own purposes:

- The Information of the Luxembourgish students and the future students
- The Pooling of Luxembourgish Students, abroad or in Luxemburg
- The Representation of the Luxembourgish students and defense of their rights on national as well as on international political stage

== Student Unions ==
=== Specific ===
- ALEM Medical students
- ALEP Psychology students
- ANEIL Engineering students
- ANELD Association nationale des Etudiants luxembourgeois en Droit
- ANESEC Association nationale des Etudiants en Sciences Econmiques
- elSiC Etudiants luxembourgeois en Sciences de l'Information et de la Communication
- Historic.ul Association des Etudiants en Histoire de l'Université du Luxembourg
- Jonk BAD Librarianship students

=== Countries ===
==== Austria ====
- LSI Innsbruck
- LSW Vienna

==== Belgium ====
- CELB Brussels
- CELBas Bastogne
- LESTLE Liège
- GDL Louvain-la-Neuve

==== France ====
- AELP Paris
- ALUS Strasbourg
- CELM Montpellier
- ELAN Nancy
- Letz'Aix Aix-en-Provence

==== Germany ====
- AELK Karlsruhe
- ALESONTIA Bonn
- AVL Aachen
- LSB Bingen
- LSC Cologne
- LSD Düsseldorf
- LSH Heidelberg
- LSK Kaiserslautern
- LSM Munich
- LSS Saarbrücken
- LST Treves
- LSWü Würzburg
- SLUF Freiburg
- VLIB Berlin

==== Great-Britain ====
- SLSB Students in Great Britain

==== Luxemburg ====
- LSS Luxembourg

==== Netherlands ====
- RLA Amsterdam
- LSMaas Maastricht

==== Switzerland ====
- AELL Lausanne
- Friblëtz Fribourg
- LSSG St. Gallen
- LSZ Zurich

==== United States ====
- LUAM Miami University, Oxford

==== Others ====
- aAcel Alumni of ACEL
- REEL Organisational committee of the REEL

== Information ==
One of the main goals of ACEL is to inform the students. In order to do so, ACEL publishes yearly its Guide of the future Graduate, which aims to facilitate student's entry onto the job market. Furthermore, ACEL also tries to inform the future students and this via its Guide of the future Student. Published first in 1987, it appears yearly in September and delivers practical information on the different cities and their universities. It is realized together with ACEL's different member unions and tries to answer questions related to housing, registration and what to look out for in general as a student. The Guide of the future Graduate, published first in 1999, pools all the necessary information for a successful entry upon the job market. It is published annually in the autumn with the Guide of the future student. Both guides are free and retrievable from ACEL itself and the CEDIES.

Besides the 2 Guides, ACEL also publishes its Zoom, which is published yearly for the Student fair. This publication consists of a review of the ongoing academic year and the activities of ACEL. Within one encounters the experiences and the different projects of the member student unions, as well as information concerning the latter.

ACEL presents itself is an informational booklet on the different activities of ACEL and its main goals.

Besides its publications, ACEL participates in the different study fairs organized by the Luxembourgish secondary schools and tries to answer the pupils' questions regarding their future academic studies.

Furthermore, ACEL also organizes yearly its Student for one day. During these day trips to different cities and their universities, which are organized together with ACEL's member unions, pupils get the chance to have a first hands on experience of the different cities, the universities, the student unions as well as the various fields of studies. The choices taken by the pupils during their last year of secondary school may define their future and ACEL tries to give them a deep insight into the life as a student during the Student for one day.

== Pooling ==
The information and the political representation of the Luxembourgish students are ACEL's defining goals, but those two wouldn't be achievable without the aid of its member unions. In order to maintain the positive relation between ACEL and its members, the pooling pillar tries to regroup Luxembourgish students as well in Luxemburg as abroad. This goal is achieved via different events throughout the academic year

=== De Studentebal ===
The Students' Ball is unique in its nature. Thanks to its organizational form, it has established itself as the biggest open air student ball in Luxemburg. Together with ACEL, more than 20 of its member unions are present and propose the different typical drinks of their cities of study in a creatively designed environment. The event enables the Luxembourgish student, who throughout the academic year are spread across Europe, to get together. The different member unions participate in the raising and the truing of the site and the benefice is fairly divided among the participating students unions. With the generated profit the different student unions are able to propose different activities to their members in the following year.

=== Tournoi de Noël / Christmas Tournament ===
During the Christmas Holiday, the different member unions of ACEL compete each other in a sports tournament, which includes football, basketball and volleyball. The ranks on the campus Geesseknäppchen in Luxemburg-city are always filled. Even if the competing teams always give their fullest, amusement and sportsmanship are the most important traits of the tournament. ACEL takes care of the organizational aspects of the championship and the LASEL ( the Luxembourgish secondary school sports federation ) organizes the athletic aspects of the tournament. The generated profit is contributed as donation to a good cause.

=== Intercercles and balls ===
Throughout the academic year, the student unions organize various events with different activities. During an event, a so-called intercercle, the organizing student union offers for example a cultural activity or a culinary one for which it invites the other student unions of ACEL to join. The background idea is to create get-togethers for students. ACEL offers sponsoring to the organizing student unions.

== Representation ==
As important as the information and the pooling of the students is their political representation and the defence of their rights on the national as well as on an international level. Within this political context, ACEL fosters a constant dialogue with the responsible Ministries, as for example the Ministry of higher education. ACEL also represents its members among the Council on higher education and the Financial Aid Committee.

For several years ACEL invests itself into a constructive dialogue with the Luxembourgish political powers to discuss the themes most mattering for students. It is in this context that ACEL has been able to achieve in 2016 an increase of the financial aid given to the Luxembourgish students by the government.

Furthermore, ACEL has managed to achieve that Luxembourgish students pursuing their studies in France or Germany are freed of paying fees such as the GEZ in Germany or the taxe d'habitation in France.
