= Ace 2 =

Ace 2 may refer to:

- Angiotensin-converting enzyme 2 (ACE2)
- ACE 2 (video game), Air Combat Emulator II, a video game released in 1987
- Samsung Galaxy Ace 2, a smartphone

== See also ==
- Ace (disambiguation)
