= Donald Goerke =

American businessman (1926–2010)

- Goerke with his most famous product SpaghettiOs
- Born: Donald Edward Goerke; August 8, 1926; Waukesha, Wisconsin United States
- Died: January 10, 2010 (aged 83)
- Education: Carroll College
- Occupation: Business executive

Donald Edward Goerke (August 8, 1926 – January 10, 2010) was an American business executive and food developer. While working for the Franco-American division of the Campbell's in 1965, he invented SpaghettiOs, and was thereafter known as "The Daddy-O of SpaghettiOs."

== Biography ==
Born in Waukesha, Wisconsin, Goerke played for the Waukesha South High School basketball team that won the Wisconsin state championship in 1944. He served in the U.S. Army Air Force during World War II and received a bachelor's degree from Carroll College after the war. He also received an M.B.A. from the University of Wisconsin.

Goerke began his career as a market researcher for Blatz Brewery in Wisconsin. He worked for the Campbell Soup Company for 35 years from 1955 until 1990.

In the early 1960s, Goerke was marketing research director of Campbell's Franco-American division when he was tasked with developing a canned pasta that would appeal to children. Goerke's team reportedly considered and rejected pasta and sauce in the shapes of baseballs, cowboys, spacemen and stars. Goerke settled on the "O" shape to make the pasta more resilient to canning and reheating, provide easier consumption using a spoon, and minimize the mess associated with children eating long pasta.

The product, promoted in commercials with Jimmie Rodgers singing the jingle, "The neat, round spaghetti you can eat with a spoon: Uh-oh, SpaghettiOs," became a major success. Goerke attributed the product's enduring popularity with mothers and children to the fact that "it was 'spoonable' and didn't make a mess." Goerke earned the nickname the "Daddy-O of SpaghettiOs", and served as a goodwill ambassador for the Campbell Soup Company. He appeared on the television program "What's My Line?". and "hobnobbed with celebrities" including President Ronald Reagan and Martha Stewart. He would occasionally autograph a can of SpaghettiOs and appeared on The Today Show to celebrate the 30th anniversary of SpaghettiOs.

In his 35 years with Campbell Soup Company, Goerke also created the company's "Chunky" soup line. He later served as the president of Campbell's Champion Valley Farms division that produced Recipe Dog Food, the sponsor of the Lassie television series.

Goerke died from heart failure at his home in Delran Township, New Jersey, in January 2010.
