= Al Goodhart =

American composer (1905–1955)

Al Goodhart (January 26, 1905 – November 30, 1955) was an American songwriter, composer, pianist, radio announcer, writer, talent agent, and vaudeville entertainer.

== Life and career ==
Al Goodhart born in New York City on January 26, 1905. He was educated at DeWitt Clinton High School. He worked in a variety of careers during his lifetime; earning a living as variously a vaudeville pianist, radio announcer, writer, composer, and talent agent.

Beginning in the early 1930s, Goodhart's career turned towards working as a composer of music for songs. A member of ASCAP, he first gained success as a tune smith working in collaboration with the already established songwriter Al Hoffman with "I Apologize", "Auf wiederseheh'n, My Dear", "Happy Go Lucky You and Broken Hearted Me", "In the Dim Dawning", "I Saw Stars", "Who Walks In", and "Fit as a Fiddle" being the most successful songs produced from their collaboration. The latter song was featured later in the 1952 film Singin' in the Rain and its subsequent stage adaptation.

In 1934 Goodhart, along with Hoffman, relocated to England to join the composing staff of the music department of the British division of the French film company Gaumont. He wrote music there from 1934 to 1937. With collaborators Hoffman and Maurice Sigler, Goodhart scored music for the stage and screen, particularly musical films starring Jessie Matthews. During WWII, Goodhart travelled with the USO, entertaining troops in the United States and abroad.

His other chief collaborators included Mann Curtis, Sammy Lerner, Ed Nelson, Kay Twomey and Allan Roberts.

He died in 1955, aged 50.

== Songs ==
1930:

- Dangerous Nan McGrew (film)

1931:

- "I Apologize" (written with Al Hoffman and Ed G. Nelson)

1932:

- "Auf Wiedersehen, My Dear" (written with Milton Ager, Al Hoffman and Ed G. Nelson)
- "Happy-Go-Lucky-You"
- "Fit as a Fiddle" (written with Arthur Freed and Al Hoffman)
- "It's Winter Again"

1933:

- "Roll Up the Carpet"
- "Meet Me in the Gloaming"
- "Two Buck Tim from Timbuctoo"

1934:

- "I Saw Stars" (written with Al Hoffman and Maurice Sigler)
- "Jimmy Had a Nickel"
- "Who Walks in When I Walk Out?" (written with Ralph Freed and Al Hoffman)
- "Why Don't You Practice What You Preach?"
- "Your Guess Is Just as Good as Mine"

1935:

- "Black Coffee" (written with Al Hoffman and Maurice Sigler)

1936:

- (This'll Make You Whistle - British stage show): "Crazy With Love"
- "I'm in a Dancing Mood" (written with Al Hoffman and Maurice Sigler)
- "There Isn't Any Limit to My Love" (written with Al Hoffman and Maurice Sigler)
- "My Red Letter Day" (written with Al Hoffman and Maurice Sigler)
- (She Shall Have Music - British film): "She Shall Have Music" (written with Al Hoffman and Maurice Sigler)
- "My First Thrill"
- (First a Girl - British film): "Everything's in Rhythm With My Heart"
- "Say the Word and It's Yours" (written with Al Hoffman and Maurice Sigler)
- "I Can Wiggle My Ears"
- (Jack of All Trades - British film): "Where There's You, There's Me"
- (Come Out of the Pantry - British film) - "Everything Stops for Tea" (written with Al Hoffman and Maurice Sigler)
- "There's Always A Happy Ending"

1937:

- (Gangway - British film): "Gangway" (written with Al Hoffman and Sammy Lerner)
- "Lord and Lady Whoozis" (written with Al Hoffman and Sammy Lerner)

1939:

- "Romance Runs in the Family" (written with Al Hoffman and Manny Kurtz)

1942:

- "Johnny Doughboy found a Rose in Ireland" (written with Allan Roberts and Kay Twomey)
- "Better Not Roll Those Blue, Blue Eyes"

1947:

- "Serenade of the Bells" (written with Kay Twomey and Alfred J. Urbano)
- "Who Were You Kissing?"

1948:

- "In a Little Book Shop"

1949:

- "Festival of Roses" (written with Dick Manning)

1950:

- "The Place Where I Worship" (written with Florence Tarr)

== Other songs ==
- "Black Eyed Susan Brown" (written with Al Hoffman and Herbert Magidson)
- "I Was Watching a Man Paint a Fence" (written with Ed G. Nelson and Harry Pease)
- "I Wish I Had a Record" (written with Hal David and Arthur Altman)
- "May All Your Troubles Be Little Ones"
- "Smith and Jones" (written with Kay Twomey)
- "Stop the Music" (written with Art Harry Berman)
- "Those Things Money Can't Buy" (written with Ruth Poll)
- "Watching The Trains Go By" (written with Tot Seymour)
- "With a Hey Nonny Nonny" (written with Ralph Freed and Al Hoffman)

== Notable performers of his songs ==
- "Auf Wiedersehen, My Dear" (Ray Anthony, Comedy Harmonists, Vera Lynn, Tony Martin, Jerry Vale)
- "Fit as a Fiddle" (Doris Day, Donald O'Connor, Champ Butler)
- "I Apologize" (Billy Eckstine, Bing Crosby, Engelbert Humperdinck, Jackie Gleason, Al Hirt, Artie Shaw, Bobby Vinton, Dinah Washington)
- "I Saw Stars" (Billy Butterfield, Teddi King, Marion McPartland)
- "I'm in a Dancing Mood" (Dave Brubeck, Tommy Dorsey)
- "Johnny Doughboy Found a Rose in Ireland" (Kenny Baker, Dennis Day, Sammy Kaye, Kay Kyser, Guy Lombardo)
- "The Place Where I Worship" (Red Foley, Sons of the Pioneers, Gene Autry)
- "Serenade of the Bells" (Gene Autry, Ray Coniff, the Fleetwoods, Jo Stafford, Sammy Kaye)
- "Those Things Money Can't Buy" (Nat King Cole)
- "Watching the Trains Go By" (Perry Como)
- "Who Walks In When I Walk Out?" (Louis Armstrong, Ella Fitzgerald)
- "Romance Runs in the Family" (Kay Kyser)
- "Ya Got Love" (Bennie Moten)
