= First a Girl =

1935 British comedy film

- Film poster
- Directed by: Victor Saville
- Written by: Marjorie Gaffney
- Based on: an original screenplay by Reinhold Schünzel
- Produced by: S. C. Balcon; Michael Balcon
- Starring: Jessie Matthews
- Cinematography: Glen MacWilliams
- Edited by: Al Barnes
- Music by: songs: M. Sigler; A.Goodhart; A. Hoffman musical director: Louis Levy
- Production company: Gaumont British Picture Corpn. Ltd.
- Distributed by: Gaumont British
- Release dates: 7 November 1935 (London, England)
- Running time: 94 minutes
- Country: England
- Language: English

First a Girl is a 1935 British comedy film directed by Victor Saville and starring Jessie Matthews. First a Girl was adapted from the 1933 German film Viktor und Viktoria written and directed by Reinhold Schünzel. It was remade as the 1982 American musical comedy Victor/Victoria starring Julie Andrews.

== Plot ==
In 1930's London, Elizabeth, an aspiring singer, quits her menial job in a posh luxury fashion shop. Caught in a rainstorm, she ducks into a crowded coffeehouse, where she finds herself sitting opposite an actor named Victor. Though he dreams of performing Shakespeare, Victor poses in drag in a music-hall act called 'Victoria'. He accompanies her to his boarding house, where he finds a message asking him to perform that evening. Unfortunately, he has laryngitis, due to the storm. Then Victor has an idea: Elizabeth could stand in for him and sing as a female impersonator. That night, Elizabeth's first performance is a huge success, prompting big-time promoter McLintock to come backstage and offer Elizabeth a contract. Thus, with Victor as her manager, Elizabeth tours Europe as female impersonator 'Bill' using Victor's stage name 'Victoria'.

One evening, Princess Mironoff and her fiancé Robert attend one of 'Bill's' performances. Robert finds he is attracted to the woman on stage. But when she takes off her wig to reveal boyishly cropped hair, he is shocked and embarrassed. At a nightclub after the show Victor attempts to charm the Princess with Shakespeare recitations as Robert has a manly chat with 'Bill'. Elizabeth is forced to smoke a cigar and drink large whiskeys as she attempts to maintain the pretense that she is a man. Later, when the Princess finds a feminine hair comb under 'Bill's' chair, she suspects 'Bill' is indeed a woman. She and Robert invite their new friends to travel with them to the South of France with the intention of tricking 'Bill' into revealing his true gender. The three 'men' are forced to share a room in a guesthouse for a night, but Elizabeth manages to maintain her disguise.

At the villa she has rented with Victor, Elizabeth revels in the chance to wear women's clothes again. Swimming in the sea, she nearly drowns when Robert surprises her; he has to use lifesaving techniques to get her back to shore. In a tight fitting swimsuit, there is no doubt that she is a woman. Robert, slightly embarrassed, apologizes and swims away. Tired of pretending to be a man, Elizabeth tells the Princess she is in love with Robert. However, Victor, who has designs on the Princess, must explain to all that he and Elizabeth are just good friends. Meanwhile, a nosy newspaper reporter glimpses 'Bill' in women's clothing and threatens to expose her deception. But Victor saves the day by posing as 'Bill' performing in drag to amusing effect. The Princess pledges to fund Victor in Shakespearean theater, and despite Elizabeth having a man's passport, she is waved across the French border to begin her new life with Robert.

== Cast ==
- Jessie Matthews as Elizabeth
- Sonnie Hale as Victor
- Anna Lee as Princess Mironoff
- Griffith Jones as Robert
- Alfred Drayton as Mr. McLintock
- Constance Godridge as Beryl
- Eddie Gray as Goose Trainer
- Martita Hunt as Madame Seraphina
- Donald Stewart as Singer

== Critical reception ==
BFI Screenonline wrote, "Of all the Matthews/Hale collaborations, this one seems the most polished and even-handed. A huge success at the time it was released, First a Girl is possibly the quintessential Jessie Matthews musical and certainly the most enduringly amusing for a modern audience."
