= Takes two to tango =

Takes two to Tango may refer to:

- "Takes Two to Tango" (song), a 1952 popular song first recorded by Pearl Bailey in 1952
- Takes two to tango (idiom), an idiomatic expression which US President Ronald Reagan made famous in a 1982 quip relating to détente in international affairs
