= Milton Samuels =

American pianist, composer, and music publisher (1904-1990)

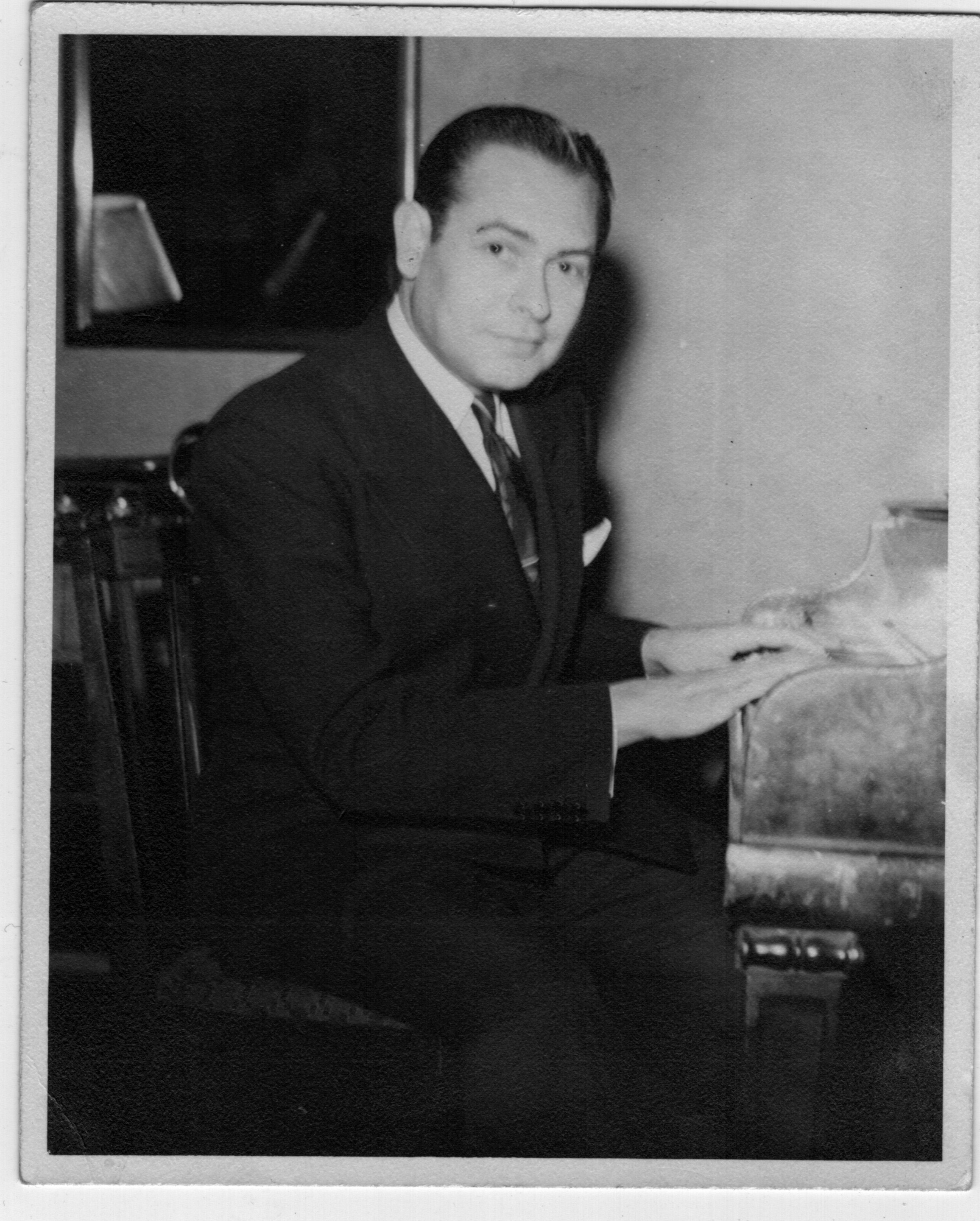
- Milton Samuels circa 1950
- Born: Isadore Milton Samuels; January 28, 1904; Denver, Colorado, U.S.
- Died: January 29, 1990 (aged 86); Studio City, Los Angeles, California, U.S.
- Occupation: Composer Lyricist Music publisher
- Years active: 1920–1980
- Children: 2

Isadore Milton Samuels (January 28, 1904 – January 29, 1990) was an American pianist, composer, and music publisher.

== Early life ==
Samuels was born January 28, 1904, in Denver, Colorado, to Russian-Jewish Immigrants Elias Samuels and Rachel Samuels (nee Varchavsky). Elias was the first rabbi and cantor at Temple Beth Medrosh Hagadol in Denver. Samuels showed an early proclivity to music, and his father hoped he would also choose a career as a cantor. Samuels, however, was far more interested in popular music and jazz.

== Musical career ==
Samuels got his first job at 13 playing piano in a local bordello and played there until he was 19 when he formed his own touring dance band. He entered the music publishing business in 1926 working as a pianist and song plugger. He continued to work as a music publisher, first in Chicago during the 1930s and early 1940s, and then in Hollywood from 1943 until the late 1960s. He worked the longest as the Hollywood manager for the publishing firm Bregman, Vocco, & Conn from 1949 until 1967.

Samuels was a prolific songwriter throughout his entire life, writing popular songs in a variety of genres, production pieces, music for film, and ad jingles. He began writing popular songs early in his life. He was just 22 years old when he wrote "Countin' the Days", which was recorded by Emil Seidel, followed over the next year with three more hit songs, "Don't You Remember Sally?" recorded by the house orchestra for Columbia Records The Columbians, "Smilin' Skies" recorded by numerous artists of the late 1920s, and "Sweet Liza", recorded by Ben Pollack and others. His most well known later songs include the standard "Jim", first recorded in 1941 by Jimmy Dorsey and Dinah Shore; "Angeline" recorded by Dick Todd and others; the country music song "Tennessee Blues", recorded by Tex Ritter and others; and "I'm Moody" recorded by Jack Jones. Samuels collaborated with a number of other composers and lyricists, including Johnny Mercer, Caesar Petrillo, Art Kassel, and Charley Straight.

Samuels also wrote songs under the pseudonyms Edward Ross and Jay Spector.

== Personal life ==
Samuels was married to Esther Samuels (née Spector) from 1927 until her death in 1970. They had two children, pianist and composer Lorelei Samuels Trepper, and the pianist, composer, and conductor Eddy Samuels. Samuels lived in Los Angeles until his death in 1990 at the age of 86.

== Selected works ==
- "A Friend of Man I'll Be" (Samuels/Ashley) – Joe Feeney
- "Andante Felicio" -- (Samuels/Felice) – Ernie Felice
- "Angeline" (Edward Ross [Samuels] /Si Rothman) – Wayne King, Art Kassel, Dick Todd
- "Countin' the Days" (Samuels/ Walter Hirsch) – Emil Seidel
- "Don't You Remember Sally" (Samuels/Bernie Grossman/Hirsch) – The Columbians
- "Fill the Cup to Overflowing" (Samuels) – Wesley Tuttle
- "Fountain in the Rain" (Samuels/Johnny Mercer/Charles Hale) – Pete Fountain
- "Honky Tonk Mountain" (Samuels/Lenny Adelson) – Molly Bee
- "I Hate Music" (Samuels) – Jerry Colonna
- "I'm Moody" (Samuels) – Jack Jones
- "Jim" (Samuels (or Edward Ross)/Ceasar Petrillo/Nelson Shawn) – Jimmy Dorsey, Dinah Shore, Billy Holliday, Ella Fitzgerald, Sarah Vaughan, Aretha Franklin, Etta Jones, Peggy Lee, Oscar Peterson, Ray Brown, Earl Hines, Samara Joy, Helen O'Connell, Maria Del Mar Bonet, Big Maybelle, Anita Ellis, Joan Chamorro, Viktoria Tolstoy, Dave McKenna, Sara Lazarus, Olga Román, and many others.
- "My Hawaii" (Samuels/Kassel) – Art Kassel & His Orchestra
- "Sergeant Can You Spare a Girl?" (Ross [Samuels]/Petrillo/Shawn) – Prairie Ramblers
- "Sweet Liza" (Samuels/Hirsch) – Ben Pollack, George Belshaw
- "Smilin' Skies" (Samuels/Charley Straight /Hirsch) – Benny Meroff, Coon Sanders Nighthawk Orchestra; Charleston Chasers; Verne Buck
- "Tennessee Blues" (Jay Spector [Samuels]) – Tex Ritter; Hardrock Gunter; Dinning Sisters; Owen Bradley; Eileen Wilson
- "The Echo Says No" -- (Ross [Samuels] /Rothman) – Wayne King
- "Virginia Lee" -- Samuels /Nat Miles /Frank Sylvano) – Jimmy Noone
- "You Ain't Got No Romance" -- Ross [Samuels] /Kassel /Gallop – Art Kassel
