= Down Yonder =

1921 popular song

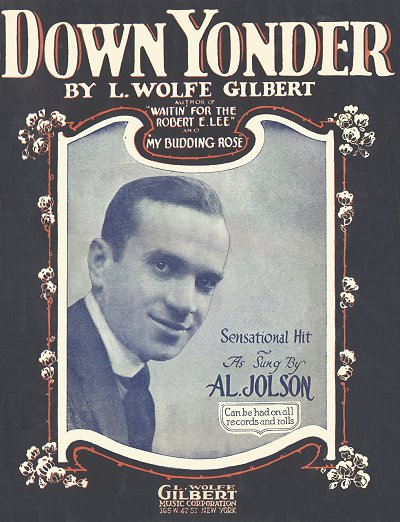
- Sheet music cover, 1921

Song
- Published: 1921
- Songwriter: L. Wolfe Gilbert

Down Yonder is a popular American song with music and lyrics by L. Wolfe Gilbert. It was first published in 1921, and was introduced in the same year at the Orpheum Theater, New Orleans.

Gilbert had written the lyrics for the 1912 song "Waiting for the Robert E. Lee" (for which Lewis F. Muir wrote the music). In "Down Yonder," Gilbert brought back four of the characters from the earlier song — Daddy, Mammy, Ephram and Sammy. However, the lyrics of "Down Yonder" are seldom heard because the song has usually been performed as an instrumental, especially on the piano or organ.

"Down Yonder" is an expression meaning "down there" in a geographic sense, referring to a place that is considerably lower in elevation or farther south. In the sense of the song's lyrics, it means "in the American South."

== Recorded versions ==
=== Before 1951 ===
"Down yonder" as performed by the American Quartet.

Recordings by Ernest Hare & Billy Jones, and by the Peerless Quartet were very popular in 1921.
In 1934, the instrumental version by Gid Tanner & His Skillet Lickers sold over one million copies, and was awarded a gold disc by the RIAA.

=== 1951 ===
Versions that charted in 1951 included those by Del Wood, Joe "Fingers" Carr, Champ Butler, Lawrence (Piano Roll) Cook, the Freddy Martin orchestra, by the Frank Petty Trio, and Ethel Smith.

Charting singles (1951)
| Artist | Company | Chart date | Weeks | Peak |
|---|---|---|---|---|
| Del Wood | Tennessee Records 775 | 8/24/51 | 25 | 4 |
| Joe "Fingers" Carr | Capitol Records 1777 | 10/12/51 | 17 | 14 |
| Champ Butler | Columbia Records 39533 | 9/21/51 | 16 | 18 |
| Lawrence (Piano Roll) Cook | Abbey Records 15053 | 9/21/51 | 2 | 23 |
| Freddy Martin | RCA Victor Records 20-4267 | 10/12/51 | 4 | 24 |
| Frank Petty Trio | MGM Records 11057 | 11/9 | 1 | 26 |
| Ethel Smith (Juke Box chart) | King Records 986 | 10/27 | 1 | 16 |

On the Cash Box charts, where all versions were combined, the song got even higher, making No. 1 for one week, December 15, 1951.

=== After 1951 ===
- 1960: An instrumental version by Johnny and The Hurricanes and released on Bigtop Records as catalog number 45-3036, backed with "Sheba". The record charted at 48 on the Billboard chart, and reached number 8 in the UK.
- 1973: Bill Monroe & Friends, on Bill Monroe's Brown County Jamboree
- 1975: Willie Nelson's sister Bobbie, on the piano, for his album The Red-Headed Stranger.
- 1975, 1989: Bill Monroe & His Blue Grass Boys.
