= It takes two to tango =

Idiom

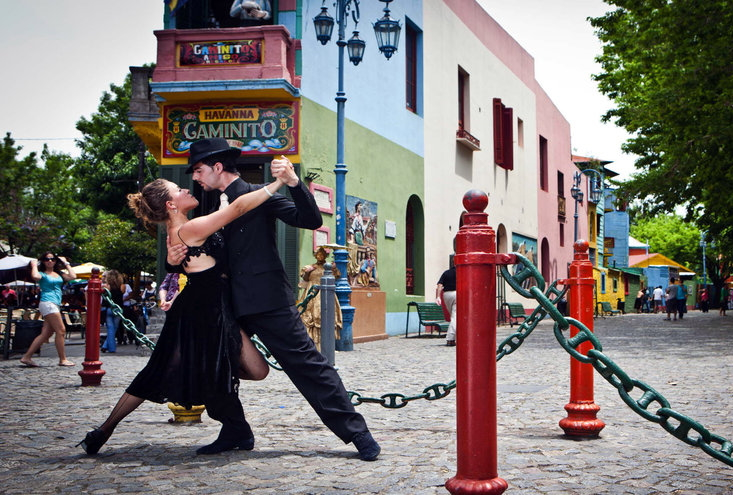
Two people dancing a tango in Buenos Aires

It takes two to tango is a common idiomatic expression which suggests something in which more than one person or other entity are paired in an inextricably-related and active manner, occasionally with negative connotations.

The tango is a dance which requires two partners moving in relation to each other, sometimes in tandem, sometimes in opposition. The meaning of this expression has been extended to include any situation in which the two partners are by definition understood to be essential—as in, a marriage with only one partner ceases to be a marriage.

== History ==
The phrase originated in a song, Takes Two to Tango, which was written and composed in 1952 by Al Hoffman and Dick Manning. The lyrics and melody were popularized by singer Pearl Bailey's 1952 recording.

The phrase was reported widely in the international media when Ronald Reagan quipped about Russian-American relations during a 1982 presidential news conference. Reagan stated: "For ten years détente was based on words by them [the Russians] and not any words to back them up. And we need some action that they—it takes two to tango—that they want to tango also." Since that time, the tango metaphor has appeared regularly in the headline of the international press. The phrase has gained currency as a proverb in loan translation in other languages.

This expression has become a familiar proverbial expression; and it has also found its way into American legal writing, as in:

- "It takes at least two to tango for conspiracy purposes."—U.S. v. Morgan, 835 F.2d 79 (5th Cir. 1987).
- "This is a situation where it takes more than two to tango"—Gant v. Aliquippa Borough, 612 F.Supp. 1139 (W.D. Penn. 1985).

More generally in instances involving a dubious transaction, like a bribe, conventional wisdom in America and in the United Kingdom presumes that if one is guilty, both are.

== Meaning ==
The lyric from which the phrase originated lists a variety of things one is able to do alone, then contrasting them with performing a tango dance, which requires a partner.

You can sail in a ship by yourself,
Take a nap or a nip by yourself.
You can get into debt on your own.
There are lots of things that you can do alone.
(But it)
Takes two to tango (repeat).

The open-ended possibilities of the idiomatic expression are available for a wide range of prospective applications.

=== It takes two to cooperate ===
"It takes two to tango" may be used to mean that some things need the active cooperation of two parties in some enterprise—for example, as in the following comment:

- "We'll never pass this bill unless both parties work out a compromise—it takes two to tango.

=== It takes two to make a bargain ===
"It takes two to tango" may be used to mean "an agreement or a consensual bargain requires the assent of both parties for the deal to be deemed successful—for example, as in the following exchange:

- "We decided you should make dinner tonight." and
- "No, we didn't decide anything—you made that decision by yourself and I had no part in it because you walked out the door before I could say anything one way or the other and it takes two to tango."

=== It takes two to make a quarrel ===
"It takes two to tango" may be used to mean "a quarrel requires two disputing parties," is an expression which is often used in situations in which both partners in the dispute should or could be said to share responsibility, or when one person is being blamed, but two are actually at fault. For example, in the following observation:

- "Love, affection and honesty are the main bases for a stable and loving parent-child relationship. Fights are rarely the fault of one alone—it takes two to tango."

== In popular culture ==
Comedian George Carlin observed: "It takes two to tango. Sounds good, but simple reasoning will reveal that it only takes one to tango. It takes two to tango together, maybe, but one person is certainly capable of tangoing on his own."

== See also ==
- Takes Two to Tango (song)
- Two-way street
- It Takes Two to Tango, 2025 French film

== General and cited references ==
- Ammer, Christine (1997). The American Heritage Dictionary of Idioms. New York: Houghton Mifflin Harcourt. ISBN 978-0-395-72774-4.
- Brooks, Peter and Paul Gewirtz (1998). Law's Stories: Narrative and Rhetoric in the Law. New Haven, Conn.: Yale University Press. ISBN 978-0-300-07490-1.
- Carlin, George (1998). Brain Droppings. New York: Hyperion. ISBN 978-0-7868-8321-9.
- Coleman, David and Stewart Levine (2008). Collaboration 2.0: Technology and Best Practices for Successful Collaboration in a Web 2.0 World. Cupertino, California: Happy About. ISBN 978-1-60005-071-8. OCLC 188535764.
- Dolgopolov, Yuri (2004). A Collection of Confusable Phrases: False 'Friends' and 'Enemies' in Idioms and Collocations. Coral Springs, Florida: Media Creations. ISBN 978-1-59526-334-6. OCLC 56012159.
- Mieder, Wolfgang and George B. Bryan (1985). "Zum Tango gehoren zwei," in Sprichwort, Redensart, Zitat: Tradierte Formelsprache in der Moderne (in German). Bern, Switzerland: Peter Lang. ISBN 978-3-261-04009-1. OCLC 13122327.
- Mieder, Wolfgang (1997). The Politics of Proverbs: From Traditional Wisdom to Proverbial Stereotypes. Madison, Wis.: University of Wisconsin Press. ISBN 978-0-299-15454-7. OCLC 35593844
- Mieder, Wolfgang (2004). Proverbs: A Handbook. Westport, Connecticut: Greenwood Publishing. ISBN 978-0-313-32698-1. OCLC 54960019.
- Thompson, Robert Farris. Tango: The Art History of Love. New York: Pantheon Books. ISBN 978-0-375-40931-8.
