= Air Lane Trio =

American music trio

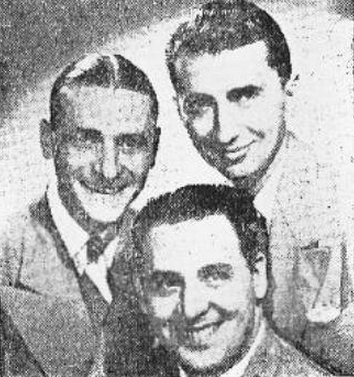

Background information
- Genres: Traditional Pop
- Labels: DeLuxe

The Air Lane Trio was a musical group active in the 1940s and 1950s. Popular over several years as a nightclub act, the group achieved minor chart success in 1947 with their recording of My Guitar Is My Sweetheart on the DeLuxe label. This recording's top chart position was #23. This song featured vocals by Ted Martin.

== History ==
The group was organized sometime around late 1942, and was led by guitarist Tony Alessi, also known as Tony Lane. Described as a "cocktail combo", in addition to guitar the group featured Arlo Hultz on organ and Ralph Pierce (real name Ralph Principe) on accordion or piano. Despite being recently formed, the trio obtained a booking at the Dixie Hotel, and soon appeared on the Mutual Radio Network. In their first year, they also appeared at Park Lane in Buffalo and Jack Dempsey's in New York. They regularly appeared on WJZ in the mid-1940s. By 1951 they were appearing on the ABC Radio network.

== Recordings ==
Although the group itself was instrumental, it often was paired with a featured vocalist or vocalists, such as Ted Martin or the Elm City Four.

=== Discography ===
(incomplete)

Credited Artist	Catalog #	A-side	B-side	Date	Notes
Vera Massey and the Air Lane Trio	DeLuxe 1015	You're Gonna Hate Yourself In The Morning	Harriet	-	
The Air Lane Trio	DeLuxe 1018	Josephine, Please No Lean on the Bell	If I Had My Way	-	
Ted Martin and the Air Lane Trio	DeLuxe 1019	My Dreamland for Two	Blonde Sailor	-	
Ted Martin and the Air Lane Trio	DeLuxe 1020	Meet Me on the Corner	Johnny on a Pony	-	
Ted Martin and the Air Lane Trio	DeLuxe 1021	Shame On You	Someday	-	
The Air Lane Trio	DeLuxe 1022	Happy Birthday Medley	Wedding March	-	
The Air Lane Trio	DeLuxe 1023	Schubert's Serenade	Chanson Bohemiene	-	
The Air Lane Trio	DeLuxe 1049	Brahms's Lullaby	Serenade From "The Student Prince"	-	
Ted Martin and the Air Lane Trio	DeLuxe 1050	All Alone	Mandy	-	
Judith Arlen and the Air Lane Trio	DeLuxe 1051	What'll I Do	Piccolino	-	
Ted Martin and the Air Lane Trio	DeLuxe 1052	Remember	Cheek To Cheek	-	
Ted Martin and the Air Lane Trio	DeLuxe 1068	Heartaches	If I Had My Life To Live Over	-	
Ted Martin and the Air Lane Trio	DeLuxe 1070	The Freckle Song	I Wonder, I Wonder, I Wonder	-	
Air Lane Trio and the Elm City Four	DeLuxe 1092	Red Head	Va-Zap-Pa	-	
Air Lane Trio and the Elm City Four and Larry Stewart	DeLuxe 1094	As Years Go By	Wedding Ring	-	
Ted Martin and the Air Lane Trio	DeLuxe 1095	Kate	Object Of My Affection	-	
The Air Lane Trio	DeLuxe 1119	Bubbles in the Wine	Mickey	-	
The Air Lane Trio	DeLuxe 1126	Bubbles in the Wine	Eleanor	-	
Tony Mango accompanied by The Air Lane Trio and the Abbeyaires	Abbey 15039	Stella	The Bridal Waltz	-	

== Film ==
The Air Lane Trio appeared in at least four "soundies" featuring burlesque girls. At least one of these films depicted the trio as female performers instead of the actual instrumentalists.

=== Filmography ===
- The Sparkle Strut (1945)
- Captain Kid (1946)
