= Singin' in the Rain (soundtrack) =

Soundtrack album by Gene Kelly, Donald O'Connor and Debbie Reynolds
- Released: 1952
- Label: MGM

Professional ratings
Review scores
Source	Rating
AllMusic	(2002 reissue)

The original soundtrack to the 1952 film Singin' in the Rain was released by MGM Records in the same year in three formats: as a set of four 10-inch 78-rpm shellac records, as a set of four 7-inch EPs, and as a 10-inch long-play record. It contained songs performed by Gene Kelly, Donald O'Connor and Debbie Reynolds.

The album reached number 2 on Billboard's both "Best Selling Pop Albums" charts: Best Selling 33⅓ R.P.M. and Best Selling 45 R.P.M.

== Track listing ==
10-inch long-play record (MGM Records E-113)

Side 1
No.	Title	Artist(s)	Length
1.	"Singin' in the Rain"	Gene Kelly
2.	"Make 'Em Laugh"	Donald O'Connor
3.	"You Were Meant for Me"	Gene Kelly
4.	"All I Do Is Dream of You"	Debbie Reynolds
5.	"Fit as a Fiddle (And Ready for Love)"	Gene Kelly and Donald O'Connor

Side 2
No.	Title	Artist(s)	Length
1.	"Moses"	Gene Kelly and Donald O'Connor
2.	"All I Do Is Dream of You"	Gene Kelly
3.	"Good Morning"	Gene Kelly, Donald O'Connor and Debbie Reynolds
4.	"You Are My Lucky Star"	Gene Kelly with an assist By Debbie Reynolds

== Charts ==
Chart (1952)	Peak position
US Billboard Best Selling Pop Albums – Best Selling 33⅓ R.P.M.	2
US Billboard Best Selling Pop Albums – Best Selling 45 R.P.M.	2
