= Oh-Oh, I'm Falling in Love Again =

1958 single by Jimmie Rodgers

Single by Jimmie Rodgers

from the album His Golden Year
- B-side: "The Long Hot Summer"
- Released: 1958
- Genre: Traditional Pop
- Label: Roulette Records

Jimmie Rodgers singles chronology
"Kisses Sweeter than Wine" (1957)	"Oh-Oh, I'm Falling in Love Again" (1958)	"Secretly" (1958)

"Oh-Oh, I'm Falling in Love Again" is a popular song written by Al Hoffman, Dick Manning, Hugo Peretti and Luigi Creatore and published in 1958. The best-known recording of the song was done by American pop singer Jimmie Rodgers, charting in 1958. It debuted on the charts in February, and spent 11 weeks on the charts that spring, peaking at No. 13 on the US Cash Box Top 100 and No. 7 on the Billboard Hot 100. It became a gold record.

== Charts ==
Chart (1958)	Peak position
Canada (CHUM Chart)	19
UK Singles (OCC)	18
US Billboard Hot 100	7
US C&W Best Sellers in Stores (Billboard)	5
US R&B Sellers in Stores (Billboard)	19
US Cash Box Top 100	13

== Other recordings ==
- Marty Wilde and The Wildcats (1958)
- Little Peggy March recorded it on her album. I Will Follow Him (1963)

== Popular culture ==
The Jimmie Rogers recording of the song was later adapted (around 1965) to advertise SpaghettiOs, and Rodgers sang the jingle in the original television ads.
