= Come Out of the Pantry =

1935 British film by Jack Raymond

- British song sheet tie in
- Directed by: Jack Raymond
- Written by: Austin Parker; Douglas Furber
- Based on: novel by Alice Duer Miller play by A.E. Thomas
- Produced by: Herbert Wilcox
- Starring: Jack Buchanan; Fay Wray
- Cinematography: Freddie Young
- Edited by: Frederick Wilson
- Music by: Harry Perritt and his Orchestra
- Production company: Herbert Wilcox Productions (for) British and Dominions
- Distributed by: United Artists (UK)
- Release dates: 25 November 1935 (London, UK)
- Running time: 71 minutes
- Country: United Kingdom
- Language: English

Come Out of the Pantry is a 1935 British musical film directed by Jack Raymond and starring Jack Buchanan, Fay Wray, James Carew and Fred Emney. It was written by Austin Parker and Douglas Furber based on the 1916 novel of the same name by Alice Duer Miller, and features musical numbers by Al Hoffman, Al Goodhart and Maurice Sigler.

== Plot ==
A British aristocrat, Lord Robert Brent, travels to New York City to sell some paintings. He deposits the money from the sale in a bank, but when the bank collapses, he finds himself stranded in America with no money and many bills. By chance, Robert meets the old family butler, Eccles, who is now working in New York for the wealthy Beach-Howard family. Eccles helps Roberts to take up employment as a footman in the Beach-Howard household. Robert becomes romantically involved with the young niece, Hilda Beach-Howard. She begins to suspect his true identity. Robert's elder brother arrives in New York to find out what has happened to his sibling. The bank that holds Robert's money reopens, and Robert proposes marriage to Hilda whilst serving dinner. She accepts his proposal.

== Cast ==
- Jack Buchanan as Lord Robert Brent
- Fay Wray as Hilda Beach-Howard
- James Carew as Mr Beach-Howard
- Fred Emney as Lord Axminster
- Olive Blakeney as Mrs Beach-Howard
- Kate Cutler as Lady Axminster
- Ronald Squire as Eccles
- Maire O'Neill as Mrs Gore
- Ethel Stewart as Rosie
- Ben Welden as Tramp
- W.T. Ellwanger as Porteous

== Production ==
Come Out of the Pantry was the first British film to star Fay Wray, three years after her appearance in King Kong (1933). She reportedly commented that she felt a certain resentment from the British cast and crew against the presence of an American star. Wray went on to make three more films in Britain, including When Knights Were Bold (1936), also with Jack Buchanan.

== Critical reception ==
Come Out of the Pantry is one of many comedy films that feature aristocratic protagonists who pose as servants, and comparisons have been drawn with the films In the Soup (1936), Ball at Savoy (1936) and Mr Cinders (1934), a retelling of the classic fairy tale Cinderella. The theme of the "aristocrat in disguise" as a member of the lower classes, and the scenario of romance between members of different social classes became popular tropes in fiction of the interwar period, and Come Out of the Pantry has also been compared to Jack Buchanan's other films in this genre such as A Man of Mayfair and Goodnight, Vienna (both 1932).

Writing for The Spectator in 1935, Graham Greene was critical of the film's portrayal of British social class, and criticised the film as a typical example of the "snobby" and classist English film whose subtle social humour "would be quite meaningless to any but an English audience".

TV Guide called it an "entertaining musical."

== Songs ==
The film includes the following songs:

- "Everything Stops for Tea", by Al Hoffman, Al Goodhart and Maurice Sigler, sung by Jack Buchanan
- "From One Minute to Another", by Al Hoffman, Al Goodhart and Maurice Sigler

A version of "Everything Stops for Tea" was later recorded by blues singer John Baldry on his 1972 album Everything Stops for Tea, produced by Elton John and Rod Stewart. The song was later rewritten (except for the chorus) by chap hop artist Professor Elemental in his 2012 album, Father of Invention.

== See also ==
- Come Out of the Kitchen (1919)
- Honey (1930)
- Spring in Park Lane (1948)
