= The Windmills of Your Mind (disambiguation) =

"The Windmills of Your Mind" is a 1968 song by Noel Harrison, covered by Dusty Springfield and José Feliciano.

The Windmills of Your Mind or Windmills of Your Mind may also refer to:

- The Windmills of Your Mind (Ed Ames album), 1969
- The Windmills of Your Mind (Paul Motian album), 2011
- The Windmills of Your Mind, a 1969 Billy Vaughn album
- Windmills of Your Mind (Jimmie Rodgers album), 1969
- Windmills of Your Mind (Bud Shank album), 1969
