= SpaghettiOs =

American brand of canned pasta

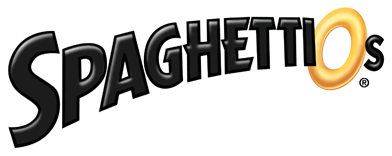
- Logo since 1995

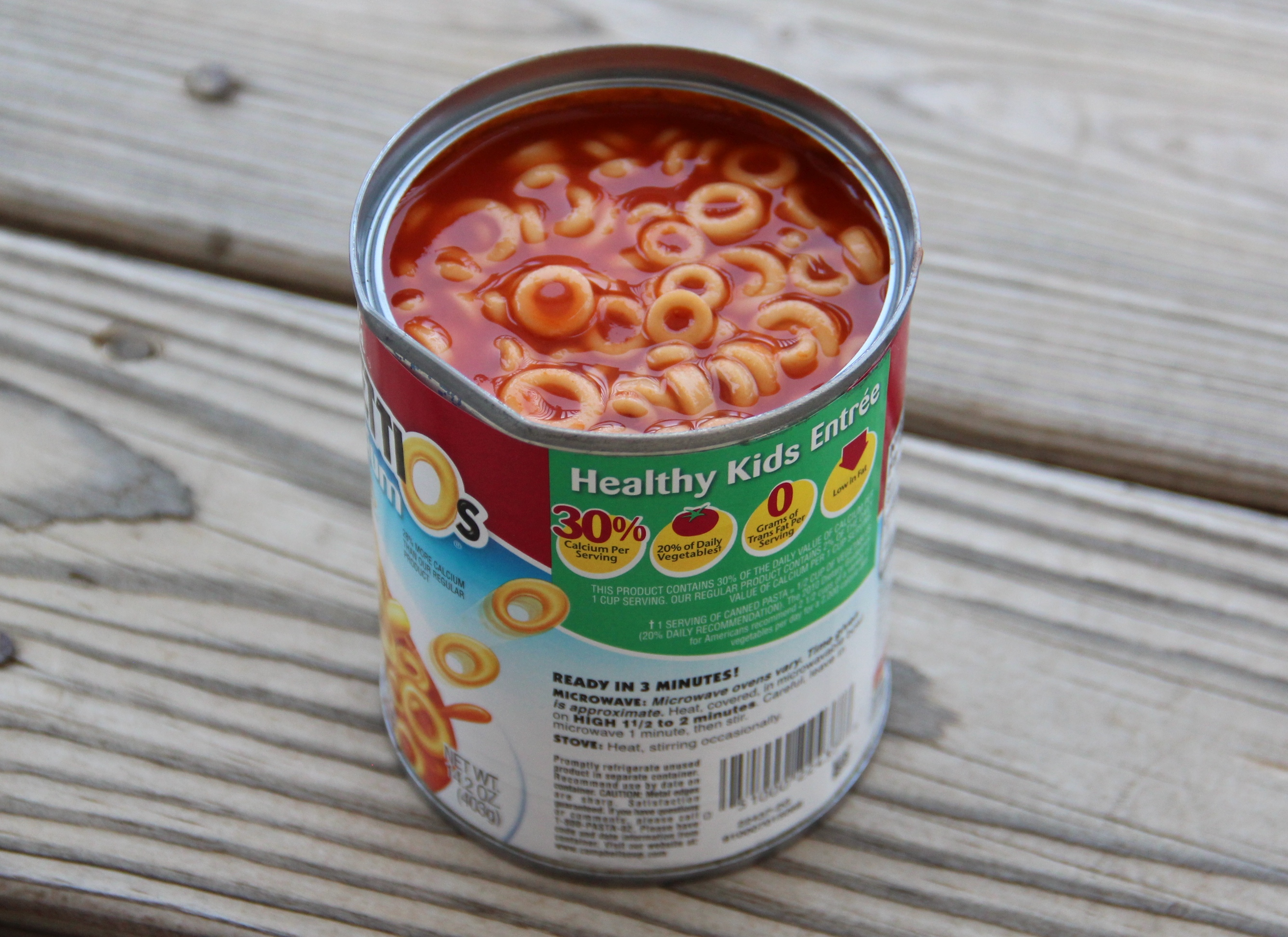
- Opened can of SpaghettiOs
- Product type: Canned pasta
- Current owner: Campbell's
- Country: United States
- Introduced: 1965; 61 years ago
- Website: campbells.com/spaghettios

SpaghettiOs are a brand of canned ring-shaped pasta in tomato sauce. They are marketed for children as "less messy" than regular spaghetti. More than 150 million cans of SpaghettiOs are sold each year. SpaghettiOs are sold in tomato sauce and with additions including meatballs, pieces of processed meat resembling hot dog slices, beef-filled ravioli, and calcium-fortified spaghetti.

While SpaghettiOs is a trade name, the equivalent prepared dish made by various manufacturers is available in many countries as 'spaghetti hoops', 'spaghetti loops', or 'spaghetti rings'.

== History ==
Canned spaghetti—short lengths in tomato sauce—was available long before rings were introduced. Ring-shaped canned pasta was introduced in 1965 by the Campbell Soup Company under the Franco-American brand, by marketing manager Donald Goerke, nicknamed "the Daddy-O of SpaghettiOs", as a pasta dish that could be eaten without mess. Other shapes considered included cowboys, Indians, astronauts, stars, and sports-themed shapes. Goerke created over 100 products during his 35 years with Campbell, including the Chunky line of soups. SpaghettiOs were introduced nationally without test marketing and with television advertising using the tag line "the neat round spaghetti you can eat with a spoon" and the jingle "Uh-Oh! SpaghettiOs" (these six notes are based on the earlier "Franco-American" jingle) sung by Jimmie Rodgers (loosely based on his 1950s song "Oh-Oh, I'm Falling in Love Again"). Other companies rapidly produced their own spaghetti hoops.

Campbell's introduced SpaghettiOs with meatballs and SpaghettiOs with sliced franks the following year in 1966.

In June 2010, Campbell recalled 15 million lbs (6.8 million kg) of SpaghettiOs with Meatballs (all that had been produced since December 2008 minus the large fraction that had already been consumed) due to the malfunction of a cooker at one of the company's Texas plants. No reports of illnesses associated with the product and no customer complaints were recorded at the time of the recall.

On the 72nd anniversary of the Japanese attack on Pearl Harbor in 2013, SpaghettiOs' Twitter account posted a lighthearted message that was criticized as disrespectful. Various parodies were posted mocking it. SpaghettiOs removed the tweet in question and apologized for any offense.

Campbell's launched Spicy Original SpaghettiOs featuring Frank's RedHot in 2023, designed to appeal to millennials, calling it a "hot, more mature twist on a classic offering that our adult consumers grew up enjoying" according to one company executive. One reviewer found the product mild compared to spicy chili but ill-suited for younger children. She enjoyed the brighter red color compared to the original product and said "good vibes are guaranteed".

== Nutrition ==
Ingredients of SpaghettiOs Original are: water, tomato puree (water, tomato paste), enriched pasta (wheat flour, niacin, ferrous sulfate, thiamine mononitrate, riboflavin, folic acid), high-fructose corn syrup, contains less than 2% of: salt, enzyme modified cheddar cheese (cheddar cheese [cultured milk, salt, enzymes, calcium chloride], water, disodium phosphate, enzymes), vegetable oil (corn, canola, and/or soybean), enzyme modified butter, skim milk, beta carotene for color, citric acid, paprika extract, flavoring. Potential allergens: wheat and milk.

== See also ==
- Alphabet pasta
- Chef Boyardee
- Filipino spaghetti
