= Vernon Brown (musician) =

American jazz trombonist

- Born: January 6, 1907; Venice, Illinois, U.S.
- Origin: St. Louis, Missouri, U.S.
- Died: May 18, 1979 (aged 72); Los Angeles, California, U.S.
- Genres: Jazz
- Instruments: Trombone

Vernon Brown (January 6, 1907 – May 18, 1979) was an American jazz trombonist that was the trombonist with Benny Goodman for 21 years, and helped participate in several major songs, such as Sing, Sing, Sing and One O'Clock Jump.

== Career ==
Brown played in St. Louis with Frankie Trumbauer in 1925–26, and moved through a variety of groups in the late 1920s and 1930s, including those of Jean Goldkette (1928), Benny Meroff, and Mezz Mezzrow (1937). Brown joined Benny Goodman's orchestra in 1937 and remained there until 1940; while he only soloed occasionally with Goodman, he became particularly well known through this association. Following this he worked with Artie Shaw (1940–41), Jan Savitt, Muggsy Spanier (1941–42), and the Casa Loma Orchestra.

In the 1940s, Brown switched focus from swing to Dixieland, playing often in studio recordings and working with Sidney Bechet.

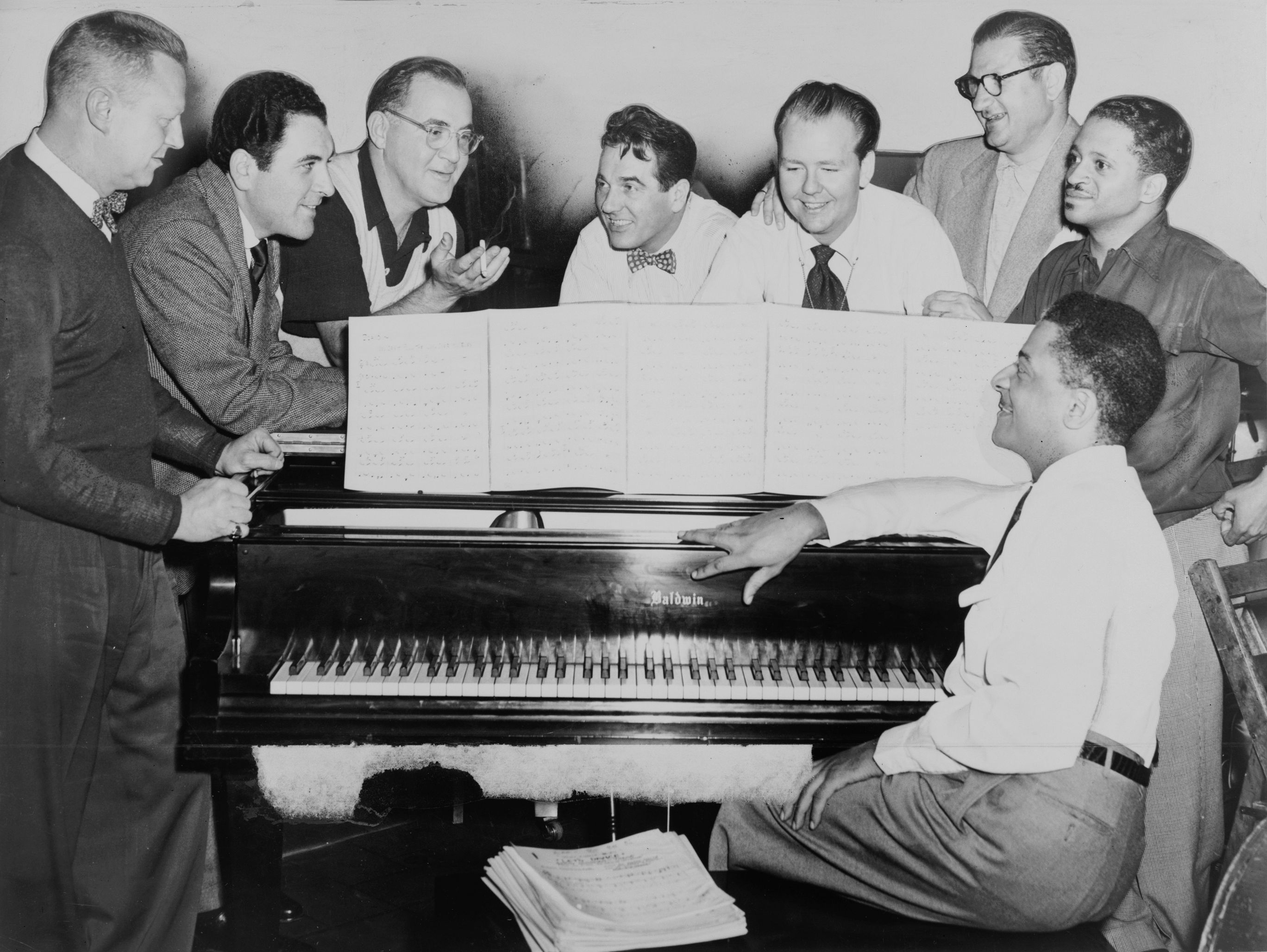
Vernon Brown (left) with Benny Goodman (third from left) and some of Goodman's former musicians in 1952. Left to right: Brown, George Auld, Goodman, Gene Krupa, Clint Neagley, Ziggy Elman, Israel Crosby and Teddy Wilson (at piano)

Brown performed with Louis Armstrong and his All Stars for the ninth Cavalcade of Jazz concert held at Wrigley Field in Los Angeles. The concert was produced by Leon Hefflin, Sr. on June 7, 1953. Also featured that day were Roy Brown and his Orchestra, Don Tosti and His Mexican Jazzmen, Earl Bostic, Nat "King" Cole, and Shorty Rogers and his Orchestra.

He led his own band in the Pacific Northwest in 1950 and did reunion tours with Goodman in that decade. He worked with Tony Parenti in 1963, and remained a studio musician into the early-1970s.

== Personal life ==
Later in his life, Brown lived in Roslyn Heights, New York. He died in Los Angeles in 1979.
