= Jimmie Rodgers (pop singer) =

American singer (1933–2021)

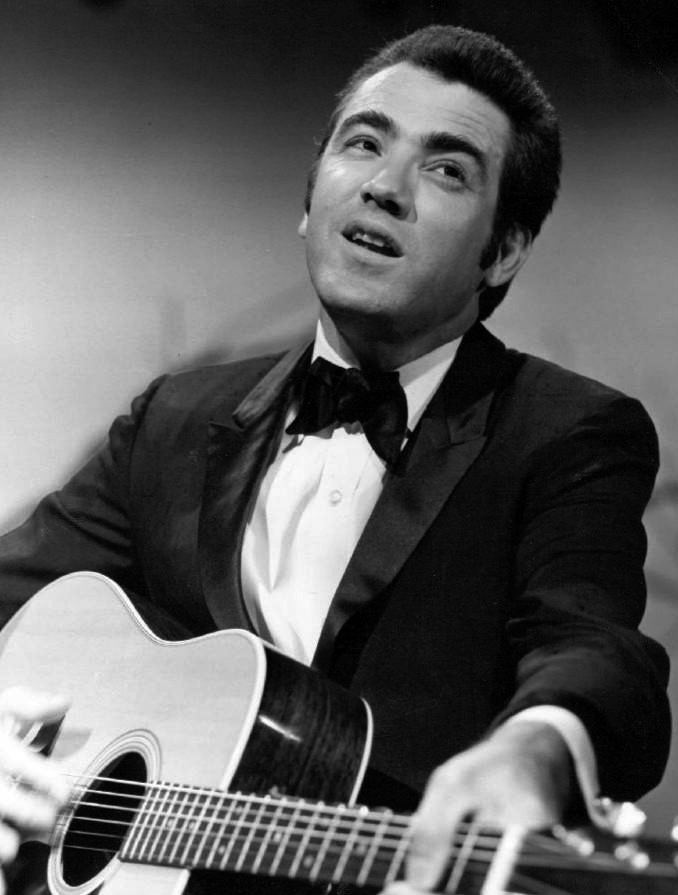
- Rodgers in 1968

Background information
- Also known as: Jimmie F. Rodgers (credited as)
- Born: James Frederick Rodgers; September 18, 1933; Camas, Washington, U.S.
- Died: January 18, 2021 (aged 87) Palm Desert, California, U.S.
- Genres: Folk; traditional pop; rock and roll; rockabilly; country
- Occupations: Singer; musician; songwriter
- Instruments: Vocals; guitar; piano
- Years active: 1957–2021
- Labels: Roulette; Dot; A&M

James Frederick Rodgers (September 18, 1933 – January 18, 2021) was an American pop singer. In the 1950s and 1960s, Rodgers had a run of hits and mainstream popularity. His string of crossover singles ranked highly on the Billboard Pop Singles, Hot Country and Western Sides, and Hot Rhythm and Blues Sides charts; in the 1960s, Rodgers had more modest successes with adult contemporary music.

He was not related to country music pioneer Jimmie C. Rodgers (1897–1933), who died the same year the younger Rodgers was born. Among country audiences, and in his official songwriting credits, the younger Rodgers, Jimmie Frederick, was often credited as Jimmie F. Rodgers to differentiate the two.

== Career ==
=== Early years ===
Rodgers was born in Camas, Washington. He was the second son of Archie and Mary Rodgers. His mother, a piano teacher, taught him music and he began performing as a child, first entertaining at a Christmas show when he was only five. He learned to play the piano and guitar and performed locally.

After attending Camas High School, he briefly took courses at Clark College in Vancouver, Washington. He later went to work at the Crown Zellerbach paper mill in Camas. Although he loved music, he was uncertain whether he could turn it into a career. He was drafted and served in the United States Air Force during the Korean War.

=== 1950s ===
While in the Air Force, Rodgers joined a band named The Melodies, started by violinist Phil Clark. During his service, he was transferred to Nashville, Tennessee, where he was stationed at Sewart Air Force Base from 1954 to 1956. It was during this time that he began expanding his musical repertoire. While he was in Nashville, he first heard "Honeycomb," the song that became his first hit.

Like several other entertainers of the era, he was one of the contestants on Arthur Godfrey's talent show on CBS television, winning $700. Producers Hugo Peretti and Luigi Creatore saw Rodgers perform and signed him to a recording contract with Morris Levy's company, Roulette Records.

In the summer of 1957, Rodgers recorded his version of "Honeycomb," written by Bob Merrill and recorded by Georgie Shaw three years earlier. The tune was Rodgers' biggest hit, staying at the top of the charts for four weeks. It sold over 1 million copies and was awarded a gold disc by the RIAA. Over the following year, he had several other hits that reached the top 10 on the charts: "Kisses Sweeter than Wine," "Oh-Oh, I'm Falling in Love Again," "Secretly," and "Are You Really Mine?." Other hits include "Bo Diddley," "Bimbombey," "Ring-a-ling-a-lario," "Tucumcari," "Tender Love and Care (T.L.C)," and a version of Waltzing Matilda as a film tie-in with the apocalyptic movie On the Beach in 1959.

In the United Kingdom, "Honeycomb" reached number 30 in the UK Singles Chart in November 1957, and "Kisses Sweeter than Wine" climbed to number 7 the following month. Both "Kisses Sweeter than Wine" and "Oh-Oh, I'm Falling in Love Again" were million sellers.

The success of "Honeycomb" earned Rodgers guest appearances on numerous variety programs during 1957, including the "Shower of Stars" program, hosted by Jack Benny, on October 31, 1957, and the Big Record with Patti Page, on December 4, 1957. Rodgers also made several appearances on the Ed Sullivan Show, including on September 8, 1957, when he was seen by 48,500,000, the largest television audience of his entire career and on November 3, 1957. In 1958, he appeared on NBC's The Gisele MacKenzie Show. Also in 1958, he sang the opening theme song of the film The Long, Hot Summer, starring Paul Newman, Joanne Woodward and Orson Welles. He then had his own short-lived televised variety show on NBC in 1959.

=== 1960s ===
In 1960, Rodgers' "Wreck of the John B" was a number 1 hit in Canada, and reached No. 64 on the U.S.charts. His biggest hit of the decade in the UK was "English Country Garden", a version of the folk song "Country Gardens", which reached number 5 in the chart in June 1962. In 1962, he moved to the Dot label, and four years later to A&M Records. He also appeared in some films, including The Little Shepherd of Kingdom Come and Back Door to Hell, which he helped finance.

In 1966, a long dry spell ended for Rodgers when he re-entered the Top 40 with "It's Over" (later to be recorded by Eddy Arnold, Elvis Presley, Glen Campbell, Mason Williams, Scott Walker, and Sonny James). In 1967, he changed record labels, signing with A&M Records. It was with that label that Rodgers had his final charting Top 100 single, "Child of Clay", written by Ernie Maresca (of "Shout! Shout! (Knock Yourself Out)" fame). He performed the song on several television variety shows, including The Smothers Brothers Comedy Hour, but never became a big hit; it reached number 31 on the Billboard charts.

=== Later career ===
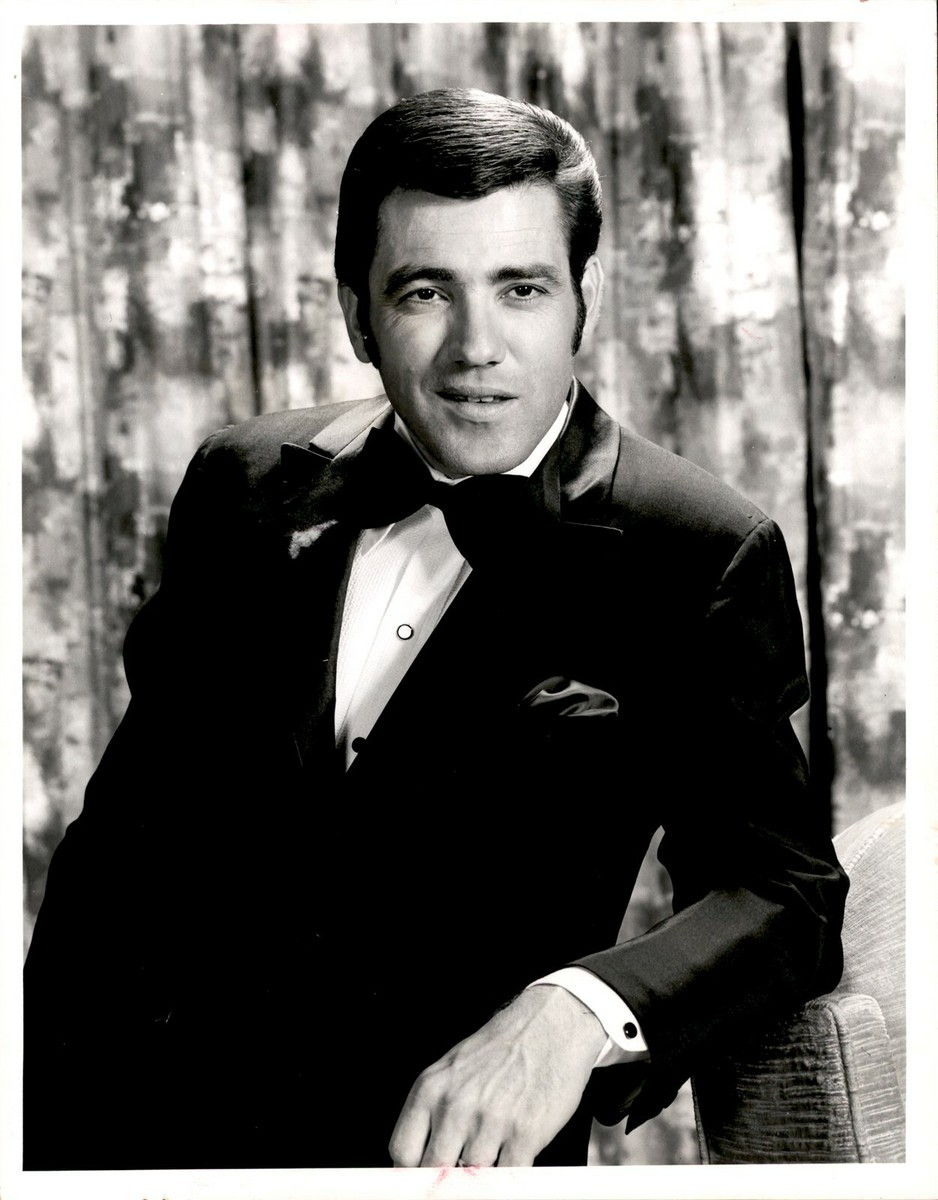
Rodgers as headliner for his summer show on KFRE-TV, June 15, 1969

Recovery from injuries sustained mysteriously on a highway in 1967 caused an approximately year-long period in which Rodgers ceased to perform. Meanwhile, his voice was still being heard: Several of his earlier hits were used in jingles in the 1970s, one for SpaghettiOs and another for Honeycomb breakfast cereal. And Rodgers' songs continued to make the Billboard Country and Easy Listening charts until 1979. During the summer of 1969, he briefly returned to network television with a summer variety show on ABC (which later bought the rights to Rodgers' Dot Records releases, now owned by Universal Music Group). It was not until the early 1980s that he began doing limited live appearances again. Among the earliest was a series of shows in late February 1983: he performed at Harrah's Reno Casino Cabaret. He also performed a few shows in other cities, including at a nightclub named Mister Days in Fort Lauderdale, Florida, in late 1983.

Rodgers appeared in the 1999 video Rock & Roll Graffiti by American Public Television, along with about 20 other performers. Nevertheless, he tried "Honeycomb," and he mentioned that he had a show in Branson, Missouri.

Rodgers returned to his hometown of Camas, Washington, in 2011 and 2012, performing to sell-out crowds. In 2013, his neighbors successfully got a street named after him in the neighborhood where he grew up.

In 2010, Rodgers wrote and published his autobiography, Dancing on the Moon: The Jimmie Rodgers Story.

== Head injuries ==
On December 1, 1967, Rodgers suffered traumatic head injuries after the car he was driving was stopped by an off-duty police officer near the San Diego Freeway in Los Angeles. He was found unconscious in his car by his conductor Eddy Samuels, who became worried when Rodgers failed to meet him at Rodgers’ home as planned. Rodgers had a fractured skull and required several surgeries. Initial reports in the newspapers attributed his injuries to a severe beating with a blunt instrument by unknown assailants. Rodgers had no specific memory of how he had been injured, remembering only that he had seen blindingly bright lights from a car pulling up behind him.

A few days later, the Los Angeles Police Department (LAPD) stated that off-duty LAPD officer Michael Duffy (at times identified in the press as Richard Duffy) had stopped him for erratic driving, and that Rodgers had stumbled, fallen and hit his head. According to the police version, Duffy then called for assistance from two other officers, and the three of them put the unconscious Rodgers into his car and left the scene. That account was supported by the treating physicians, who had first blamed the skull fracture on a beating, but by the latter part of December, they concluded that Rodgers had fallen and that this had caused his injuries.

=== Lawsuits ===
The following month, Rodgers filed an $11 million lawsuit against the City of Los Angeles, claiming that the three officers had beaten him. The police and the L.A. County District Attorney rejected these claims, although the three officers (identified in the press as Michael T. Duffy, 27; Raymond V. Whisman, 29, and Ronald D. Wagner, 32) were given two-week suspensions for improper procedures in handling the case, particularly their leaving the injured Rodgers alone in his car. (He was later found by a worried friend.) Duffy had had a previous four-day suspension for using unnecessary force; he had used a blackjack on a juvenile.

The three officers and the LA Fire and Police Protective League filed a $13 million slander suit against Rodgers for his public statements accusing them of brutality.

Neither suit came to trial; the police slander suit was dropped, and in 1973, Rodgers elected to accept a $200,000 settlement from the Los Angeles City Council, which voted to give him the money rather than to incur the costs and risks of further court action. Rodgers and his supporters still believe that one or more of the police officers beat him, although other observers find the evidence inconclusive. In his 2010 biography Me, the Mob, and the Music, singer Tommy James wrote that Morris Levy, the Mafia-connected head of Roulette Records, had arranged the attack in response to Rodgers' repeated demands for unpaid royalties he was due by the label. All of Rodgers' most successful singles had been released by Roulette, which was notorious for not paying its artists for their record sales.

In 1993, Raymond Virgil Whisman, one of the three officers who were alleged to have assaulted Rodgers, was arrested for assaulting his wife and threatening to kill her. The arrest occurred after sheriff's deputies stormed his house after being informed that he was holding his wife at gunpoint. Deputies found 11 rifles, four shotguns, and two handguns in the home. Whisman was charged with two counts of assault and two counts of making terroristic threats.

== Personal life ==
Rodgers and his first wife, Colleen (née McClatchey), divorced in 1970; she died on May 20, 1977. They had two children, Michael and Michele. He married Trudy in the same year: they had two sons, Casey and Logan, and divorced in the late 1970s. He married Mary: they were still married when he died. They had a daughter, Katrine, born in 1989.

Rodgers suffered from spasmodic dysphonia for several years, during which period he could hardly sing. After a 2012 concert, he returned home for open heart surgery following a heart attack he had suffered three weeks earlier.

Rodgers died from kidney disease on January 18, 2021, at the age of 87.

== Discography ==
=== Albums ===
Year	Album	Chart positions			Label
Year	Album	US	US CB	CAN	Label
1957	Jimmie Rodgers	15	12	—	Roulette
1958	The Number One Ballads	—	—	—	Roulette
1958	Jimmie Rodgers Sings Folk Songs	—	—	—	Roulette
1959	Jimmie Rodgers… His Golden Year	—	16	—	Roulette
1959	Jimmie Rodgers TV Favorites, Volume 1	—	—	—	Roulette
1959	Twilight on the Trail	—	—	—	Roulette
1959	It's Christmas Once Again	—	—	—	Roulette
1960	When the Spirit Moves You	—	—	—	Roulette
1960	At Home with Jimmie Rodgers	—	—	—	Roulette
1961	The Folk Song World of Jimmie Rodgers	—	—	—	Roulette
1961	15 Million Sellers	—	—	—	Roulette
1962	No One Will Ever Know	—	—	—	Dot
1963	Jimmie Rodgers in Folk Concert	—	—	—	Dot
1963	My Favorite Hymns	—	—	—	Dot
1963	Honeycomb & Kisses Sweeter Than Wine	—	—	—	Dot
1963	The World I Used to Know	—	—	—	Dot
1964	12 Great Hits	—	—	—	Dot
1965	Deep Purple	—	—	—	Dot
1965	Christmas with Jimmie Rodgers	—	—	—	Dot
1966	The Nashville Sound	—	—	—	Dot
1966	Country Music 1966	—	—	—	Dot
1966	It's Over	145	—	—	Dot
1967	Love Me, Please Love Me	—	—	—	Dot
1967	Golden Hits	—	—	—	Dot
1967	Child of Clay	162	100	—	A&M
1969	Windmills of Your Mind	183	—	92	A&M
1970	Troubled Times	—	—	—	A&M
1978	Yesterday/Today	—	—	—	Scrimshaw

=== Singles ===
==== 1950s ====
Year	Single (A-side, B-side) Both sides from same album except where indicated	Chart positions						Album
Year	Single (A-side, B-side) Both sides from same album except where indicated	US	US Country	US R&B	US CB	CAN	UK	Album
1956	"I Always Knew" b/w "I Won't Sing Rock and Roll"	—	—	—	—	—	—	Non-album tracks
1957	"Honeycomb" b/w "Their Hearts Were Full of Spring" (Non-album track)	1	7	1	1	1	30	Jimmie Rodgers
1957	"Kisses Sweeter than Wine" b/w "Better Loved You'll Never Be"	3	6	8	5	6	7	Jimmie Rodgers
1958	"Oh-Oh, I'm Falling In Love Again" /	7	5	19	13	19	18	His Golden Year
1958	"The Long Hot Summer"	77	—	—	49	43	—	His Golden Year
1958	"Secretly" /	3	5	7	4	8	—	His Golden Year
1958	"Make Me a Miracle"	16	flip	7	31	15	—	His Golden Year
1958	"Are You Really Mine?" /	10	13	—	14	14	—	His Golden Year
1958	"The Wizard"	45	—	—	—	14	—	His Golden Year
1958	"Bimbombey" b/w "You Understand Me" (Non-album track)	11	—	—	11	10	—	His Golden Year
1959	"Because You're Young" /	62	—	—	30	17	—	His Golden Year
1959	"I'm Never Gonna Tell"	36	—	—	39	17	—	His Golden Year
1959	"Ring-a-Ring a Lario" /	32	—	—	38	20	—	15 Million Sellers
1959	"Wonderful You"	40	—	—	—	—	—	Just for You
1959	"Tucumcari" b/w "The Night You Became Seventeen" (from Just for You)	32	—	—	34	32	—	15 Million Sellers
1959	"Wistful Willie" b/w "It's Christmas Once Again" (from It's Christmas Once Again)	112	—	—	—	—	—	Non-album tracks
1959	"T.L.C. Tender Love and Care" /	24	—	—	27	13	—	Non-album tracks
1959	"Waltzing Matilda"	41	—	—	—	—	—	Jimmie Rodgers Sings Folk Songs

==== 1960s ====
Year	Single (A-side, B-side) Both sides from same album except where indicated	Chart positions					Album
Year	Single (A-side, B-side) Both sides from same album except where indicated	US	US AC	US CB	CAN	UK	Album
1960	"Just a Closer Walk with Thee" b/w "Joshua Fit The Battle O' Jericho"	44	—	55	2	—	When the Spirit Moves You
1960	The Wreck of the "John B." b/w "Four Little Girls in Boston"	64	—	50	1	—	At Home with Jimmie Rodgers - An Evening of Folk Songs
1960	"Woman from Liberia" b/w "Come Along Julie" (from At Home with Jimmie Rodgers)	—	—	—	—	18	The Best of Jimmie Rodgers Folk Songs
1961	"When Love Is Young" b/w "The Little Shepherd of Kingdom Come"	—	—	—	—	—	Non-album tracks
1961	"Everytime My Heart Sings" b/w "I'm on My Way"	—	—	—	—	—	Non-album tracks
1961	"I'm Goin' Home" b/w "John Brown's Baby"	—	—	—	—	—	Non-album tracks
1961	"A Little Dog Cried"/	71	16	—	—	—	The Best of Jimmie Rodgers Folk Songs
1961	"English Country Garden"	—	—	—	—	5	Non-album tracks
1962	"You Are Everything to Me" b/w "Wand'rin Eyes"	—	—	—	—	—	Non-album tracks
1962	"No One Will Ever Know" b/w "Because"	43	14	50	—	—	No One Will Ever Know
1962	"Rainbow at Midnight" b/w "Rhumba Boogie"	62	16	62	32	—	Non-album tracks
1963	"I'll Never Stand in Your Way" b/w "Afraid"	—	—	—	—	—	Non-album tracks
1963	"Face in a Crowd" b/w "Lonely Tears" (from It's Over)	129	—	—	—	—	Non-album tracks
1963	"(I Don't Know Why) I Just Do" b/w "Load 'Em Up (An' Keep on Steppin')"	—	—	—	—	—	Non-album tracks
1963	"I'm Gonna Be the Winner" b/w "Poor Little Raggedy Ann" (Non-album track)	—	—	—	—	—	No One Will Ever Know
1964	"Two-Ten, Six-Eighteen (Doesn't Anybody Know My Name)" b/w "The Banana Boat Song" (from Honeycomb & Kisses Sweeter Than Wine)	78	—	70	—	—	Town and Country
1964	"Mama Was a Cotton Picker" b/w "Together" (Non-album track)	131	—	—	—	—	Town and Country
1964	"The World I Used to Know" b/w "I Forgot More Than You'll Ever Know" (from 12 Great Hits)	51	9	61	32	—	Town and Country
1964	"Someplace Green" b/w "Water Boy"	—	—	—	—	—	Town and Country
1965	"Two Tickets" b/w "The Bell Witch"	—	—	—	—	—	Non-album tracks
1965	" (My Friends Are Gonna Be) Strangers" b/w "Bon Soir, Mademoiselle"	—	—	—	—	—	Deep Purple
1965	"Careless Love" b/w "When I'm Right You Don't Remember"	—	—	—	—	—	Non-album tracks
1965	"Beachcomber (Are You Going My Way)" b/w "Little School Girl"	—	—	—	—	—	Non-album tracks
1965	"Hollow Words" b/w "Bye, Bye Love"	—	—	—	—	—	The Nashville Sound
1965	"The Chipmunk Song (Christmas Don't Be Late)" b/w "In the Snow" (from The Nashville Sound)	—	—	—	—	—	Christmas with Jimmie Rodgers
1966	"A Fallen Star" b/w "Brother Where Are You" (Non-album track)	—	—	—	—	—	12 Great Hits
1966	"It's Over" b/w "Anita, You're Dreaming" (from Country Music 1966)	37	5	55	29	—	It's Over
1966	"Young Ideas" b/w "Morning Means Tomorrow" (from It's Over)	—	—	—	—	—	Non-album track
1966	"Love Me, Please Love Me" b/w "Wonderful You"	—	—	—	—	—	Love Me, Please Love Me
1967	"Time" b/w "Yours and Mine" (Non-album track)	—	—	—	—	—	It's Over
1967	"I'll Say Goodbye" b/w "Shadows" (Non-album track)	—	20	—	—	—	Child of Clay
1967	"Child of Clay" b/w "Turnaround"	31	21	30	—	—	Child of Clay
1967	"What a Strange Town (The People Had No Faces)" b/w "If I Were the Man" (from Child of Clay)	—	—	—	—	—	Non-album track
1968	"I Believed It All" b/w "You Pass Me By"	—	25	—	—	—	Child of Clay
1968	"Today" b/w "The Lovers"	104	19	90	80	—	Child of Clay
1968	"How Do You Say Goodbye" b/w "I Wanna Be Free" (from Child of Clay)	—	—	—	—	—	Windmills of Your Mind
1969	"Tomorrow Is My Friend"^{A} b/w "Cycles" (from Windmills of Your Mind)	—	39	—	—	—	Non-album track
1969	"The Windmills of Your Mind" b/w "L.A. Breakdown (And Let Me In)"	123	—	—	—	—	Windmills of Your Mind
1969	" (Without Her) Father Paul" b/w "Me About You" (from Windmills of Your Mind)	—	—	—	—	—	Non-album track

- ^{A}"Tomorrow Is My Friend" also peaked at No. 28 on RPM Adult Contemporary.

==== 1970s ====
Year	Single (A-side, B-side) Both sides from same album except where indicated	Chart positions		Album
Year	Single (A-side, B-side) Both sides from same album except where indicated	US Country	US AC	Album
1970	"Troubled Times" b/w "The Dum Dum Song"	—	—	Troubled Times
1972	"Froggy's Fable" b/w "Daylight Lights the Dawning"	—	30	singles only
1972	"Kick the Can" b/w "Go on By"	—	—	singles only
1977	"A Good Woman Likes to Drink with the Boys" b/w "Everybody Needs Love"	67	—	Yesterday -- Today
1978	"Everytime I Sing a Love Song" b/w "Just a Little Time"	74	—	Yesterday -- Today
1978	"When Our Love Began"; B-side unknown	—	—	Yesterday -- Today
1978	"Secretly" b/w "Shovelin' Cole Missouri" (from Yesterday -- Today)	65	46	Non-album tracks
1979	"Easy to Love" /	89	—	Non-album tracks
1979	"Easy" (featuring Michele Rodgers)	flip	—	Non-album tracks

== Films ==
Rodgers parlayed his singing fame into a brief movie career with lead performances in:

- The Little Shepherd of Kingdom Come (1961)
- Back Door to Hell (1964)

Jimmie sang the song titled "Half Sung Song" in the 1977 comedy film The Billion Dollar Hobo, starring Tim Conway.

== Television ==
TV appearances included performances on American Bandstand, Kraft Music Hall, and Hootenanny, as well as the following:

- Hee Haw — Himself (2 episodes, November 25, 1979, and November 3, 1980)
- The George Burns Show — Himself; Jimmie Rodgers Moves in with Ronnie (1 episode, March 3, 1959). When Jimmie Rodgers moves in with Ronnie, the apartment is suddenly overrun with pretty young groupies, so a jealous Judi turns to George for help.
- The Mike Douglas Show — Himself (2 episodes, May 15 and May 21, 1970)
- The Merv Griffin Show — Himself (1 episode, May 5, 1970)
- The Andy Williams Show — Himself (1 episode, January 24, 1970)
- House Party, a.k.a. Art Linkletter's House Party — Himself (1 episode, August 24, 1964)
- The Ford Show, Starring Tennessee Ernie Ford — Himself (Several appearances, 1959–1960)
- Sunday Showcase, aka NBC Sunday Showcase — The Jimmy Durante Show (1959) — Himself (1 episode, 1959)
- The Steve Allen Show, a.k.a. The Steve Allen Plymouth Show (U.S.: new title) — Himself — Singer (2 episodes, Nos 4.31/4.4 — 1958–1959)
- Toast of the Town, a.k.a. The Ed Sullivan Show — Himself (4 episodes, Nos. 0.50/11.6/11/18/11.36 — 1957–1958)
- The 30th Annual Academy Awards (1958) — Himself — Performer
- Shower of Stars — Himself (1 episode, Comedy Time — 1957)
- The Jimmie Rodgers Show (1959 TV series), a.k.a. Carol Burnett Presents the Jimmie Rodgers Show (1969 TV series)

In the mid-1960s, he re-recorded (with altered tunes and words referring to the products) two of his best-known songs, for use in television advertisements:

- "Honeycomb" was adapted for a Post Cereals product named "Honeycomb".
- "Oh-Oh, I'm Falling in Love Again" was adapted for one of Franco-American's pasta products: "Uh-Oh, SpaghettiOs!"
