= Bear Down, Chicago Bears =

Song by Jerry Downs
- Language: English
- Published: 1941
- Genre: Fight song
- Songwriter(s): Jerry Downs (a.k.a. Al Hoffman)

"Bear Down, Chicago Bears" is the fight song of the Chicago Bears of the National Football League. It was written in 1941 by Al Hoffman under the pseudonym Jerry Downs, though Hoffman appeared to have little connection to Chicago. The song was written during the early stages of the "Monsters of the Midway" Era of the early 1940s, and was adopted the year after the Bears had shocked the professional football world by defeating the Washington Redskins in the league championship game by the score of 73-0, which remains the largest win margin in any game in the history of the NFL.

At home games, a version of the song recorded in 1993 by Bill Archer and the Big Bear Band is played every time the Bears score.

The lyrics are as follows:

Bear down, Chicago Bears! Make every play clear the way to victory.
Bear down, Chicago Bears! Put up a fight with a might so fearlessly.
We'll never forget the way you thrilled the nation with your T-formation.
Bear down, Chicago Bears, and let them know why you're wearing the crown.
You're the pride and joy of Illinois! Chicago Bears, bear down!

After the Bears' Super Bowl XX win during the 1985 season, the Chicago Symphony Orchestra and Chorus performed and recorded the song for London Records.

The song was featured in Madden NFL 11's soundtrack.
