= Papa Loves Mambo =

Single by Perry Como
- B-side: "The Things I Didn't Do"
- Released: September 1954
- Recorded: August 31, 1954
- Genre: Mambo
- Length: 2:38
- Label: RCA Victor
- Songwriters: Al Hoffman; Dick Manning; Bix Reichner
- Producer: Joe Reisman

Perry Como singles chronology
| "Hit and Run Affair" (1954) | "Papa Loves Mambo" (1954) | "(There's No Place Like) Home for the Holidays" (1954) |

"Papa Loves Mambo" is a popular song written by Al Hoffman, Dick Manning, and Bix Reichner and released in 1954.

The best-known version was recorded by Perry Como with Mitchell Ayres's orchestra in New York City on August 31, 1954. The U.S. release peaked at No. 4 on the Billboard chart in January 1955. The recording was part of a wave of popular mambo music in the U.S. alongside songs like "They Were Doin' the Mambo" and "Mambo Italiano".

== Other recordings ==
- Bing Crosby also recorded the song in 1954 for use on his radio show and it was subsequently included in the CD El Senor Bing [Deluxe Edition] issued in 2013.
- Johnnie Ray – a single release for Columbia Records (1955).
- Nat King Cole – a single release for Capitol Records (1954).

== In popular culture ==
- The Perry Como version was originally planned to be used in the 1985 movie Back to the Future as the song that played when Marty McFly enters the 1955 version of Hill Valley, but was scrapped by the producers in favor of The Four Aces' version of "Mister Sandman". Instead, "Papa Loves Mambo" plays on Biff Tannen's car radio as he drives to the Enchantment Under the Sea dance in the 1989 sequel Back to the Future Part II.
- The Como recording was featured in the Season 8 episode of The Middle titled "The Par-Tay."
- The Nat King Cole version was featured in the first episode of Season 2 of Only Murders in the Building. The episode was titled "Persons of Interest" and was telecast on June 28, 2022.
- The Como version was featured in the 2007 action game Bioshock.
- The Como record was heard during the credits of the 2010 film Red.
- A snippet of Como's recording is found during a montage of failed attempts in the 2001 film Ocean's Eleven.
- The song briefly plays (anachronistically) in the background (starting about 52:40) in the 2026 Netflix movie The Swedish Connection that depicts events leading up to the Rescue of the Danish Jews.

== Chart positions ==
| Chart (1954/1955) | Peak position |
|---|---|
| Belgium (Ultratop 50 Flanders) | 1 |
