= Sweet September =

Single by The Lettermen

from the album More Hit Sounds of The Lettermen
- B-side: "I Believe"
- Released: 1965
- Label: Capitol
- Songwriter(s): Bill McGuffie, Phyllis Kasha, Stanley Mills

The Lettermen singles chronology
"Secretly" (1965)	"Sweet September" (1965)	"You'll Be Needin' Me" (1966)

"Sweet September" is a song written by Bill McGuffie, Phyllis L. Kasha, and Stanley Mills. The song was first released as a single by Artie Butler in 1963.

== Other versions ==
- Pete Jolly (for his 1963 album Pete Jolly Trio and Friends),
- Freda Payne (for her 1964 album After the Lights Go Down Low and Much More!!!). Payne's version was also released as a single on the Impulse Records label, but it failed to garner much success.
- The Lettermen (for their 1966 album More Hit Sounds of The Lettermen), In 1965, this version was a hit on the Easy Listening chart when released as a single, peaking at #24.
- Howard Roberts (for his 1966 album Whatever's Fair!)
- Joe Pass (for his 1965 album A Sign of the Times)
- Sylvia Syms.
