= Eddy Samuels =

American composer (1933–1986)

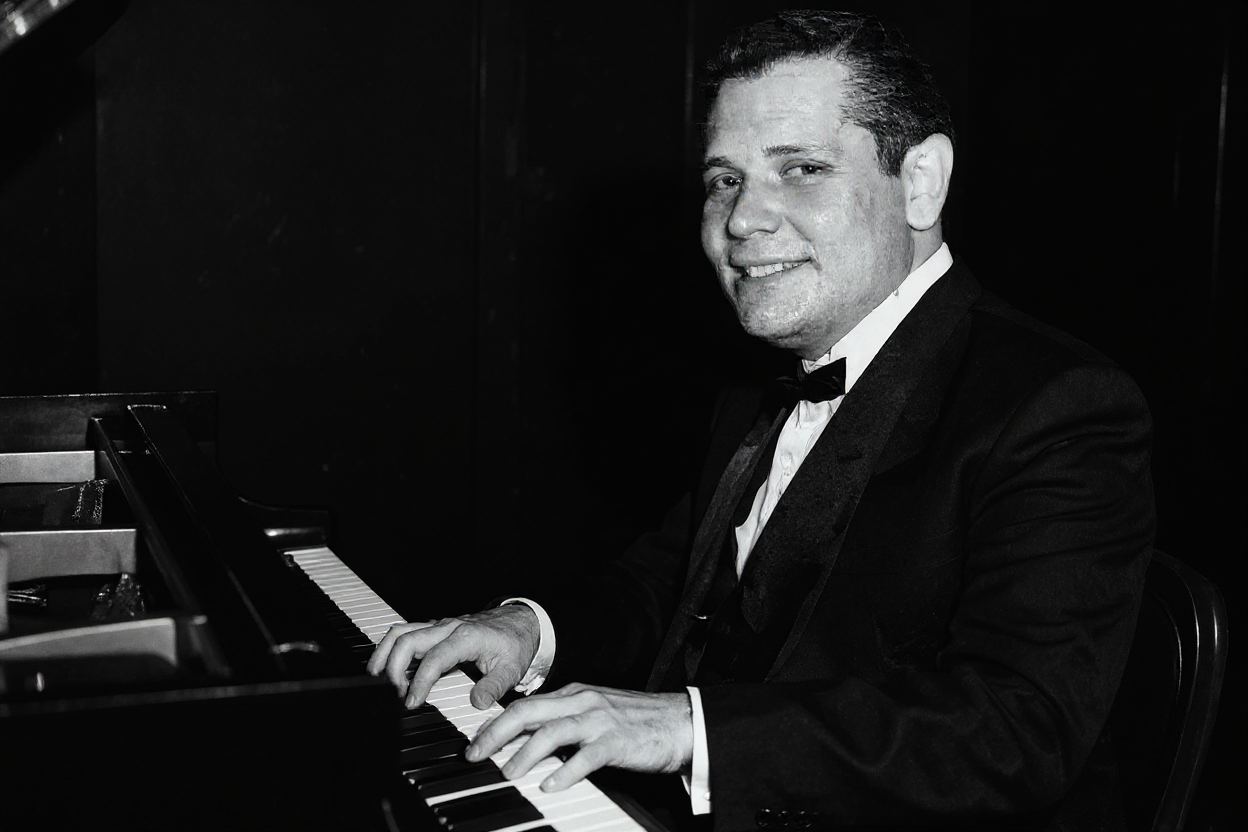
- Eddy Samuels at the Piano, circa 1952
- Born: Edward Ross Samuels; September 22, 1933; Chicago, Illinois, U.S.
- Died: September 16, 1986 (aged 52); Town and Country, Missouri, U.S.
- Occupations: Conductor, pianist, accompanist, composer, arranger
- Years active: 1936–1986
- Spouse: Judith Berman (m. 1962–1966) Sandy Lawson (m. 1980)
- Children: 4

Eddy Samuels (born Edward Ross Samuels; September 22, 1933 – September 16, 1986) was an American pianist, musical director, arranger, and composer, known for his work with major entertainers such as Eddie Fisher, Jimmie Rodgers, Shecky Greene, Shirley Bassey, and Peggy King. His career spanned radio, television, film, and international stage performance for five decades.

== Early life ==
Samuels was born in Chicago, Illinois, into a musical family. His grandfather Elias Samuels was a rabbi and cantor in Denver, CO, and his father was the songwriter and music publisher Milton Samuels. Samuels began performing at the age of three on the Morris B. Sachs Amateur Hour, and by four had his own sponsored radio program. A musical prodigy, the three year old Samuels initially taught himself to play by ear, replicating almost note for note the classical music played by his older sister, herself a prodigy in classical piano. When the family moved to Hollywood in 1943, Samuels began began instruction with the renowned Hollywood piano teacher Harry Fields.

== Career ==
By his early teens Samuels was active around the major studios of Los Angeles. In 1947, when he was just 14 years old, Samuels was hired into Metro‑Goldwyn‑Mayer's music department as a young vocal coach and then a music director along with another young prodigy André Previn. He accompanied and coached well‑known performers during this period, including Judy Garland, Debbie Reynolds, with whom he had a life-long friendship, and Peggy King, with whom he worked as her accompanist, arranger, and conductor. During that time, he and a young vocalist from the studio, Kay Brown, had a local Los Angeles television show. In 1949, when he was 16, Samuels had his own radio show in Los Angeles on KIEV where he played piano and interviewed celebrity guests.

Samuels became nationally known in the 1950s as Peggy King's accompanist and arranger. He was regularly featured alongside King on television programs including The George Gobel Show. King credited him with shaping her sound and arrangements. Their collaboration continued well into the 1970s, with regular concert and nightclub appearances, along with recording collaborations.

In 1956, Samuels was introduced to Eddie Fisher by his friend Debbie Reynolds, and then spent the next eighteen years as Fisher's pianist, conductor, and musical director, touring internationally and working on Fisher's television material. He helped modernize Fisher's act, introducing medleys and new repertoire for live audiences. Although during this period he also accompanied and conducted for other headliners such as Danny Thomas, Shirley Bassie, Jimmie Rodgers, and Shecky Greene, he continued to work with Fisher.

In the late 1960s, Samuels began working as Jimmie Rodgers' accompanist, arranger, and conductor. Samuels helped Rodgers update his material and develop a new nightclub act. In 1967 he also began working with Rodgers on a movie musical The World Through the Eyes of Children, with music by Samuels and lyrics by Rodgers. While the movie was finally completed in 1974, after a long delay due to Rodgers' traumatic brain injury, it was never distributed.

On December 1, 1967, while on his way home from a party, Rodgers suffered traumatic head injuries after the car he was driving was stopped by an off-duty police officer near the San Diego Freeway in Los Angeles. Samuels, who had attended the party with Rodgers and who was driving his own car back to Rodgers' home, became concerned when Rodgers did not return to his home. Samuels then retraced the route and found Rodgers unconscious and severely injured. He had a fractured skull, required several surgeries, and lived with a plate in his head the rest of his life. While Rodgers after a number of years was able to return to performing, he never recovered the level of success that he once had.

In 1974 Samuels began working with the comedian Shecky Greene. For the next eight years, Samuels served as his accompanist. arranger, and conductor for Greene's shows, often singing duets and trading quips.

In 1980, Samuels married his second wife and semi-retired to St. Louis, MS, stating "I loved the road, but after 32 years I'm ready to settle down." He soon began performing with his own trio in at St. Louis show cubs, was a voice artist work for local and national commercials, and was a staff announcer at KPLR TV in St. Louis.

== Personal life ==
Samuels was married twice: first to Judith Berman (1962–1966), and later to Sandy Lawson (1980–until his death). He had two children with Berman and was step-father to the two children of Lawson and her late husband.

Samuels died of cancer on September 16, 1986, in Town and Country, MO. He was 52 years old.

== Selected Compositions and Artists ==
- "Calla Calla (The Bride)" (Samuels/Adelson/Almeda) — Vic Damone
- "Waltz to the Blues" (Samuels/Adelson) — Margaret Whiting
- "I Long to Belong to Someone" (Samuels/Adelson) — Dick Kallman
- "Jamie" (Samuels) — Jane Powell
- "The Way of Life" (Samuels) — Jane Powell
- "Mary Christmas" (Samuels/Eddie Fisher) — Eddie Fisher
- "The Life That I Love" (Samuels/Schwimmer) — Eddie Fisher
- "The World Through the Eyes of Children" (Samuels/Jimmy Rodgers) — Jimmy Rodgers
- "Oh What a Memory We Made" (Samuels/Johnny Mercer) — Peggy King
