= Are You Really Mine? =

"Are You Really Mine?" is a popular song. It was written by Al Hoffman, Dick Manning, and Hugo Peretti and Luigi Creatore and accompanied by With Hugo Peretti & His Orchestra. The best-known recording of the song was done by Jimmie Rodgers, charting at number 10 on the U.S. Billboard chart in 1958 and number 15 in Canada.
