= Secretly =

1958 single by Jimmie Rodgers

Single by Jimmie Rodgers

from the album Jimmie Rodgers . . . His Golden Year
- B-side: "Make Me a Miracle"
- Released: May 1958
- Length: 2:37
- Label: Roulette
- Songwriters: Al Hoffman, Dick Manning, Hugo Peretti, Luigi Creatore

Jimmie Rodgers singles chronology
"The Long Hot Summer" (1958)	"Secretly" (1958)	"Make Me a Miracle" (1958)

"Secretly"

Single by The Lettermen

from the album More Hit Sounds of The Lettermen
- B-side: "The Things We Did Last Summer"
- Released: September 1965
- Length: 2:16
- Label: Capitol
- Songwriters: Al Hoffman, Dick Manning, Hugo Peretti, Luigi Creatore

The Lettermen singles chronology
"Theme from A Summer Place" (1965)	"Secretly" (1965)	"Sweet September" (1965)

"Secretly" is a song written by Al Hoffman, Dick Manning, Hugo Peretti, and Luigi Creatore, and published in 1958. The best-known recording of the song was done by Jimmie Rodgers, which was a gold record.

== Chart performance ==
The Jimmie Rodgers recording charted in 1958, reaching number three on the US Billboard Hot 100 and number five on the US Billboard C&W Best Sellers in Stores chart. On the R&B Best Sellers in Stores chart, it went to number seven. In Canada it reached number 8.

== Cover versions ==
The song was revived in 1965 when the Lettermen released it as a single. Their version reached number 64 on the Billboard Hot 100 and number 8 on the Easy Listening chart.
