= Mama, Teach Me to Dance =

Pop song from 1956

"Mama, Teach Me to Dance" is a popular song written by Al Hoffman and Dick Manning and published in 1956.

The song is best known in a 1956 recording by Eydie Gormé, which charted at number 34 on the Billboard Top 100 in 1956. The record was released as catalog number 9722 by ABC-Paramount Records.

In the UK, it was covered by Alma Cogan in 1956 as the B-side to "I'm in Love Again". Neither side charted.
