= Close to You (1943 song) =

Song composed by Hoffman, Lampl, Livingston; recorded by Sinatra

Song by Frank Sinatra
- Genre: Pop standard
- Composer: Jerry Livingston
- Lyricists: Carl Lampl & Al Hoffman

"Close to You" is a popular song written by Jerry Livingston, Carl Lampl and Al Hoffman.

== Recordings ==
- It has been recorded three times by Frank Sinatra; on June 7, 1943, again on December 26, 1943 for Columbia Records and on November 1, 1956 for Capitol Records. The 1956 version was issued as the title track of an album, Close to You and More, in 1957 for Capitol.
- It was covered in the UK by Vera Lynn.
