= The Mama Doll Song =

"The Mama Doll Song" is a popular music song that was written by Nat Simon with lyrics by Charles Tobias. It was published in 1954. A recording by Patti Page was released by Mercury Records as catalog number 70458. It first reached the Billboard magazine Best Seller chart on October 20, 1954 and lasted 3 weeks on the chart, peaking at #24. The flip side was "I Can't Tell a Waltz from a Tango."

British cover versions were recorded by the Beverley Sisters, Lita Roza and Jean Campbell.
