= I Can't Tell a Waltz from a Tango =

"I Can't Tell a Waltz from a Tango" is a popular song, written by Al Hoffman and Dick Manning and published in 1954. The best-known version in the United States was recorded by Patti Page; the best-known version in the United Kingdom by Alma Cogan, both of which were recorded in 1954. The Pee Wee King Orchestra recorded the song, reviewed as a "right smooth job" in the same month as the Patti Page's charting of the song.

The Page recording was released by Mercury Records as catalog number 70458, with the B-side "The Mama Doll Song." It entered the Billboard chart on October 16, 1954 at number 30, the only week it charted there. In Australia, "I Can't Tell a Waltz from a Tango" afforded Page a number 14 hit.

The recording by Alma Cogan was released in 1954 by His Master's Voice as a 78 rpm recording (catalog number B10786) and a 45 rpm recording (catalog number 7M 271). It reached number 6 on the UK Singles Chart. The B-side was "Christmas Cards". The song was often used in the BBC comedy radio programme, The Goon Show, by Ray Ellington and his quartet.
