= Art Kassel =

American singer-songwriter and saxophonist (c. 1904–1965)

- Born: c. 1904; Chicago, Illinois, U.S.
- Died: February 3, 1965; Los Angeles, California, U.S.
- Resting place: Forest Lawn Memorial Park
- Occupations: Singer-songwriter, saxophonist

Art Kassel (c. 1904 – February 3, 1965) was an American singer-songwriter and saxophonist.
