= J. Lawrence Cook =

American musician and prolific piano roll artist (1899–1976)

- Born: July 14, 1899; Athens, Tennessee, U.S.
- Died: April 2, 1976 (aged 76)
- Occupation: Pianist
- Instrument: Piano

J. Lawrence Cook (July 14, 1899 – April 2, 1976) was an American pianist. His output has been estimated at between 10,000 and 20,000 different roll recordings.

Cook was born in Athens, Tennessee, the son of a preacher. He was orphaned before his fourth birthday, and raised by relatives who introduced him to music, in particular his grandmother who brought him to the church where she played pump organ. He went on to become the most famous name in the history of the music roll industry.

The young black pianist arrived in New York in March 1920 and recorded some rolls for the US Music Roll Company. In May 1923, he was engaged by the QRS Music Roll Company (QRS Records), where he remained for nearly 50 years.

As a result of his prolific output, he also used pseudonyms and some roles were released under names such as Sid Laney, "Pep" Doyle, and Walter Redding. He also produced some rolls that were marketed as being played by Fats Waller.

Cook was known to produce over two piano rolls each day, along with his other jobs, such as at the B.A.B Organ Company.

J. Lawrence Cook's arranging piano is on display at the American Treasure Tour in Oaks, Pennsylvania.

== Work at B.A.B Organ Company ==
Cook, along with his piano rolls, also produced band organ rolls for the B.A.B Organ Company. In an interview with Cook in the 1970s, he was the sole arranger for B.A.B, which had produced over 800 master rolls at the time of its closure. Some of Cook's arranging for B.A.B. was never released, and is in storage in Virginia City, Montana.

The organ scales that Cook arranged for included, but are not limited to:

- 46 Key Scale
- 61 Key Scale (for Artizan D band organs)
- 66 Key Scale
- 82 Key Scale
- 87 Key Scale

Cook's work is identifiable by its switching between the counter melody (trumpet) and melody sections to play the melody, and is also known for "borrowing" notes from other sections to create a more chromatic scale.

His work has also been transcribed to the three standardized Wurlitzer band organ scales by the Play-Rite Music Co. with 46-key arrangements being transcribed to 125, 48-key to 150, and 66-key to 165, and along with being heard on Artizan and converted European organs, can also be commonly heard on Wurlitzer band organs, such as the Wurlitzer 165 at Glen Echo Park.

== Recordings ==
In 1950 and 1951, Cook made phonograph records for the Abbey label, always billed as "Lawrence (Piano Roll) Cook" and sometimes accompanied by a small jazz combo. Most of his selections were ragtime and Tin Pan Alley standards (Tiger Rag, Dizzy Fingers, etc.) as well as novelty songs (How Many G's in Peggy, Paw?). In addition to his work as the featured artist, Cook was the pianist for vocalists Jerry Cooper and Dorothy Loudon, who also recorded for Abbey. Cook's Abbey records were issued in Canada under the Quality label.
