= Champ Butler =

American singer (1926–1992)

- Born: Champ Clark Butler; December 21, 1926; St. Louis, Missouri, U.S.
- Died: March 8, 1992 (aged 65) Kittitas, Washington, U.S.
- Genres: Big band; traditional pop; country; rhythm and blues
- Years active: 1950–1992
- Labels: Columbia; Coral; Dot; Zephyr; Keen; Viscount; RRE; Five-Ten; Gillette

Champ Clark Butler (December 21, 1926 – March 8, 1992) was an American popular music singer who had several Billboard singles chart hits in the 1950s, and recorded primarily for Columbia Records. The label's head of A & R, Mitch Miller, writing about Butler's singing in 1953, described him as "one of the most versatile lads in the business." Butler had six gold records, with his singles "Them There Eyes", "Down Yonder", "Oh, Looka There, Ain't She Pretty", "Be Anything (But Be Mine)", "Fit as a Fiddle" and "I Apologize". He also featured in a nightly CBS television show, Musical Nightcap, for over two years.

== Early life ==
Champ Clark Butler was born in St. Louis, Missouri, in 1926 to Allen Monroe Butler and Pauline Acuff, but brought to California at a young age. An only child, he was named after his father's close friend, Champ Clark, a former Speaker of the House of Representatives. By 1930, the family were living in Glendale, Los Angeles, and his father, known as Monroe, was working as an advertising manager for a financial institution; he became chairman of the Los Angeles County Democratic Central Committee in the early 1930s. In 1931, Monroe was made director of finance for the California Democratic Party. Butler's parents later divorced, and by 1940, he was living with his mother, a former opera singer, in Los Angeles. Monroe latterly worked as an oil lobbyist, and was married to the sister of Senator Randolph Collier, Sarah Isabel.

Butler attended Rosewood Grammar School, John Burroughs Junior High, Beverly Hills High School and Belmont High School. After three years of high school, he worked for barn bosses in the maintenance of stables and their horses. Following his 18th birthday in December 1944, Butler registered for the World War II draft in Beverly Hills. He enlisted for military service in the US Army in March 1945, and was in the paratroops for two years. He also worked as a security guard for the Manhattan Project, which researched and developed the first atomic bombs. Butler was discharged from the army in December 1946.

== Career ==
From the age of 14, Butler wanted to be a singer. A trio was formed by Butler with two girls, The Holidays, and for a brief period, he worked as a comedy duo with a dancer. He took a job at the parking lot of the Mocambo nightclub in West Hollywood, because many of his friends from high school were working there. He parked cars for patrons such as Ava Gardner and Lana Turner, and made the rounds of radio studios during the day. Agent Barbara Belle, who was Fran Warren's manager, heard about Butler, and visited the parking lot, where, whilst leaning against Clark Gable's Jaguar car, he sang a few bars. This resulted in Belle signing Butler in July 1950, and he left the parking lot job. An audition for Columbia Records led to a "rave wire" from Ben Selvin, the company's West Coast Artists and Repertoire director, going to Columbia's head of A&R Mitch Miller. Belle took him under her wing and sharpened up his act. Butler was introduced to Miller, who signed him to the label.

Eight months later, when Warren fell ill, she personally recommended Butler to take her place at the Mocambo. He opened at the club in June 1951, which had a large banner outside saying 'Our Own Champ Butler'. Stars in the audience for his opening night included Barbara Stanwyck, Gertrude Niesen, Frankie Laine, José Ferrer and Lex Barker. It was said that "the applause and cheers brought down the house."

=== Columbia Records ===
In December 1950, Billboard reported that Butler had recorded four sides for Columbia. His first single, "Dear Dear Dear", coupled with "Dry Land", both accompanied by Skippy Martin, was released in 1951. This was followed by "Be My Love", on which he was backed by Les Brown's band; however, the song was more successful by other artists, with it becoming a hit for Mario Lanza. Butler's next single, "I Apologize", a revival of a 1931 hit for Bing Crosby, made it into Billboard magazine's Records Most Played by Disc Jockeys chart in May 1951, peaking at No. 29. This was followed by "Let Me In", a Bob Merrill composition, on which Butler sang with Paul Weston's orchestra.

In July 1951, Butler entered the Billboard Best Selling Pop Singles chart with another revival of a 1931 hit, "Them There Eyes", which had achieved success for Gus Arnheim. This reached No. 22, receiving much radio airplay, and selling 500,000 copies. In September that year, Butler charted with a revival of an even older song, "Down Yonder", which had been a hit for Ernest Hare and Billy Jones in 1921. In 1951, it was competing with a number of other cover versions which also charted. Butler's recording peaked at No. 17 on the Records Most Played by Disc Jockeys chart, whilst on the Most Played in Juke-Boxes and Best Selling Pop Singles charts, it made No. 18. The song became Butler's biggest hit, and sold nearly a million copies. The record was also in the collection of Dwight Eisenhower, who became President the following year.

In February 1952, an eight-record Columbia set by Butler was presented to President Harry S. Truman at the White House; it remained in Truman's collection at his home in Independence, Missouri, where he lived post-presidency. In May, "Be Anything (But Be Mine)", a new song on which Butler was backed by Percy Faith's orchestra, became another Billboard hit, peaking at No. 26 on the Best Selling Pop Singles chart. Columbia released two duets on which Butler was paired with Toni Arden, "Remembering" and "One Love Too Many", in the summer of 1952. In September that year, Butler appeared as a guest on Truth or Consequences, singing "Younger Than Springtime".

During the Korean War of 1950 to 1953, Butler toured with the United Service Organizations in Korea. His recorded output for Columbia included several notable contemporary pop songs which did not chart, including "Auf Wiederseh'n Sweetheart", an English language version of "Padam Padam", "I'm Walking Behind You" and "Take These Chains From My Heart". Also amongst his Columbia repertoire was "Kaw-Liga", a Hank Williams composition, and "Night of My Nights", from the musical Kismet.

In 1954, Universal International released a short film, Champ Butler Sings, directed by Will Cowan, in the form of a 15-minute musical featurette. Butler headlined the film, singing "I'm Coming Over to Love You Tonight".

=== Later recordings and activities ===
After making over forty recordings for Columbia, Butler moved to Coral Records in 1955, with whom he released six titles as singles. One of these, "Someone On Your Mind", was his fifth and final chart hit, reaching No. 77 on Billboard's Top 100 chart. Coupled with "I Want to Love You", both sides featured George Cates backing Butler. Billboard, reviewing the disc, rated the latter side more highly. The magazine noted that he was moving from pop into R & B "with considerable effect." They added, "He's got the real feel for the rockin' beat and this should get interest at both jockey and juke levels." That year, Butler recorded the title theme to the United Artists Western film Mustang!, which was not released until 1959. He also toured Australia and New Zealand as part of a package tour by American artists.

Over the next four years, Butler briefly recorded for the Dot, Zephyr, Keen, Viscount, RRE and Five-Ten labels. The latter saw him recording "Rock Hudson Rock", a tribute to the Hollywood star of the same name. He also re-recorded "Down Yonder" for Riviera. In 1959, Butler starred in Pepsi-Cola's Diamond Lil Show at the newly opened Pleasure Island theme park in Wakefield, Massachusetts, playing the character of Ragtime Cowboy Joe.

In the early 1960s, Butler owned a San Francisco nightclub, Opus One. He also recorded an album, Heartaches By the Dozen, for Gillette, which was issued in 1963. Four tracks from it were released as singles, and the album was issued digitally in 2011.

Butler moved into real estate in northern California. In 1981, it was reported that he had resumed performing, and was singing in small clubs in San Fernando Valley and Palm Springs. The following year, Butler was appearing with a trio at the Indian Wells Hotel in Indian Wells. The show was positively reviewed by The Desert Sun newspaper, and his show in May at the Comedy Haven was also well received.

His career took a different path in May 1983, with his appointment as public relations director and spokesman for Circle of Health Inc., a clinic which specialized in natural treatments without drugs. Described by The Desert Sun newspaper as "A health enthusiast for many years", Butler would be promoting a holistic cure for herpes I and II. He also worked as general sales manager for the Sky Meadows Ranch in Cle Elum, Washington, where he lived.

In July 1988, it was reported that Butler and Herb Jeffries would be headlining an outdoor show at Riverside City College in Riverside, California, for a Remembrance Day event, marking 35 years since the Korean War ceasefire. Both Butler and Jeffries had originally entertained troops on the frontline.

== Personal life and death ==
Butler married Jennifer Pomeroy, a widowed mother of three, in Tijuana, Mexico, on February 2, 1951, and the couple had a son, Champ Butler II, in February 1953. In April 1959, they had a daughter, Pamela, but were later divorced; Butler also married and divorced a second wife, Sharon. In 1972, he went to live in a small cabin in the mountains of Cle Elum, Washington. He also resided in Palm Springs. Butler's last marriage was to Alexis, and he had another daughter, Natassia.

In April 1958, Butler filed for bankruptcy. He told a hearing that his earnings had fallen from $40,000 to $50,000 in 1953 and 1954 to between $4,000 and $5,000 in 1957. "I really lived it up," he told the Bankruptcy Referee. "You can't continue to live as high when the money is not coming in as you did when it was. I've discovered that." He claimed that his assets consisted of a bongo drum and $48 in a bank account. Butler's debts at the time totalled $18,000.

Butler was fined $210 on a drunken driving charge in April 1960. He struggled with alcohol addiction for 25 years, before committing to the Alcoholics Anonymous program. "I had it all. All the things success brings–name up in lights, fans, money, expensive clothes, cars, house with a swimming pool, kidney-shaped, of course–'n' I blew it. Blew it all on a bottomless bottle of booze," he later commented.

Champ Butler died of natural causes at his home in Sky Meadows in Upper Kittitas County, Washington State on March 8, 1992, aged 65.

== Legacy ==
In 2012, the first compilation of Butler's recordings, Down Yonder With Champ Butler, was issued on Jasmine Records.
