= Benny Meroff =

American jazz musician

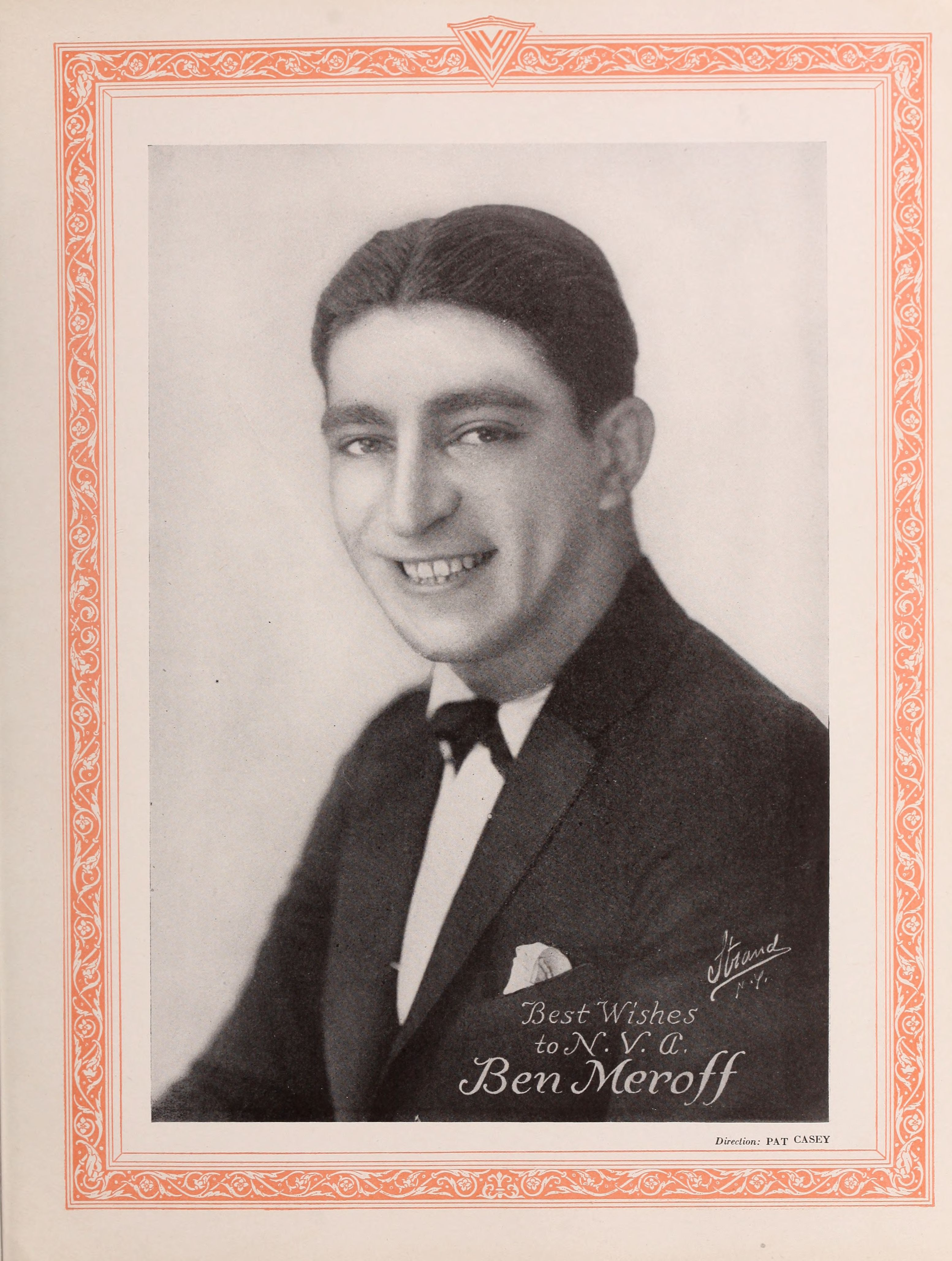

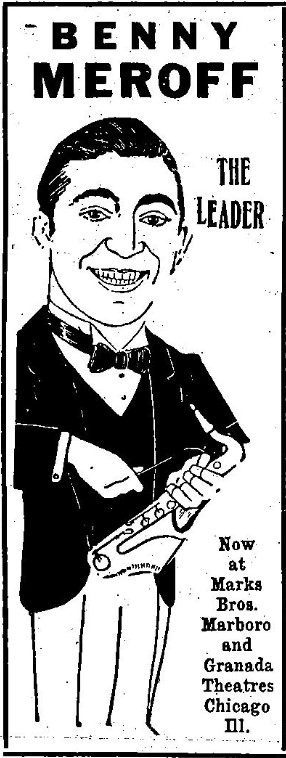
1928 advertisement in Variety

Benny Meroff (1899 – 1973) was an American dance bandleader active in the swing jazz era. He also played violin, clarinet, and saxophone.

== Biography ==
Meroff started his career in vaudeville, and put together his own ensemble in the middle of the 1920s. His sidemen included Wild Bill Davison, Al King, Vernon Brown, Frank Teschemacher, and Santo Pecora. He was principally active in Chicago in the late 1920s and early 1930s, and also played in New York into the 1940s. Meroff was noted for his showmanship as a bandleader; big band historian Leo Walker described Meroff as "a capable emcee, equally at home either conducting the band for dancing or directing a complicated stage show." He recorded for Columbia Records, Okeh Records, and Victor Records, especially at the height of his career in the late 1920s and early 1930s. Meroff disbanded his orchestra around the end of World War II and left music as a profession.

Benny Meroff and His Orchestra recorded songs including "There's A Trick In Pickin' A Chick-Chick-Chicken," "Smiling Skies," "Me And The Man In The Moon," "Happy Days Are Here Again," and "The Talk of the Town."

It has been suggested that Okeh Records #40912 was issued with Benny Meroff's name rather than that of the Frank Trumbauer Augmented Orchestra (featuring Bix Beiderbecke, Eddie Lang, Adrian Rollini, and Joe Venuti) for, perhaps, contractual reasons.
