= Fit as a Fiddle (song) =

1952 American popular song

"Fit as a Fiddle (And Ready for Love)" is an American popular song.

It was written by Arthur Freed, Al Hoffman, and Al Goodhart (or Goodheart) and published in 1932. It was a hit single that year for Fred Waring's Pennsylvanians.

The song became a well-known standard and has been recorded by many artists including, Roger Wolfe Kahn and His Orchestra, Annette Hanshaw, Elsie Carlisle, and Doris Day. In 1952, it achieved particular fame after being featured in the 1952 film Singin' in the Rain. Following this, it was covered by Champ Butler for Columbia Records.
