= Windmills of Your Mind (Jimmie Rodgers album) =

Studio album by Jimmie Rodgers
- Released: July 1969
- Recorded: 1968; 1969
- Genres: Vocal pop; Easy listening
- Length: 34 minutes 18 seconds
- Labels: A&M; SP 4187
- Producer: Allen Stanton

Jimmie Rodgers chronology
| Child of Clay (1967) | Windmills of Your Mind (1969) | Troubled Times (1970) |

Singles from Windmills of Your Mind
- 1. "How Do You Say Goodbye" Released: May 1968; 2. "Windmills of Your Mind" Released: April 1969

Professional ratings
Review scores
| Source | Rating |
|---|---|
| AllMusic | 4/5 stars |
| Billboard | Positive (Album Pick) |
| Cashbox | Positive (Pop Pick) |

Windmills of Your Mind is a studio album by American singer Jimmie Rodgers released in mid 1969 as his second release for A&M Records. It followed the namesake single's minor success in the spring. The album reached the Canadian and US pop album charts and received a positive critical reception as well.

== Background and content ==
Windmills of Your Mind was the first album Rodgers recorded in July 1969. Decades later, the album was re-released for streaming to digital sites. It was his second release for A&M Records. The album was produced by Allen Stanton and arranged by Marty Paich. It featured covers of recent pop hits and other standards, as well as his own songs. Notably, he offered interpretations of contemporary pop, country songs by Joni Mitchell, Burt Bacharach & Hal David, and Leonard Cohen.

== Reception ==
The album received a positive critical reception. Billboard believed that that "This is Rodgers' best album in a long time, because the selections, among the best of contemporary pop songs, are performed without gimmickry and unnecessary vocal adornment." They noted that "Rodgers' weekly network TVer offers a built-in promotion which should help spark sales." Cashbox magazine stated that "Rodgers has always been noted as an exceptionally fine vocalist, and this performance can only give further testament to that fact. A unique voice and a sensitive style make Rodgers a very special kind of singer, here at the top of his form." They called it a "very good sales bet."

== Chart performance ==
The album debuted on Billboard magazine's Top LP's chart in the issue dated August 30, 1969, peaking at No. 183 during a four-week run on the chart. Windmills of Your Mind debuted on the Canadian RPM Top 100 Albums chart in the issue dated May 2, 1970, peaking at No. 92 during a four week run as well.

The track "Windmills of Your Mind" debuted on the Billboard Bubbling Under the Hot 100 single chart in the issue dated May 3, 1969, peaking at number 123 during a two-week run.

== Track listing ==
Side one
| No. | Title | Writer(s) | Length |
|---|---|---|---|
| 1. | "The Windows of the World" | Burt Bacharach; Hal David | 3:09 |
| 2. | "Me About You" | Alan Gordon; Bonner | 3:34 |
| 3. | "How Do You Say Goodbye" | David Gates | 2:54 |
| 4. | "Suzanne" | Leonard Cohen | 4:43 |
| 5. | "Cycles" | Gayle Caldwell | 3:25 |

Side two
| No. | Title | Writer(s) | Length |
|---|---|---|---|
| 6. | "The Windmills of Your Mind" (Theme from The Thomas Crown Affair) | Alan Bergman; Marilyn Bergman; Michel Legrand | 2:29 |
| 7. | "Both Sides, Now" | Joni Mitchell | 3:04 |
| 8. | "The Good Times Are Gone" | Jimmie Rodgers | 3:35 |
| 9. | "I'll Never Fall in Love Again" | Burt Bacharach; Hal David | 3:17 |
| 10. | "L.A. Breakdown" | Larry Marks | 3:52 |

== Charts ==
=== Album ===
Chart peaks for Windmills of Your Mind
| Chart (1969–1970) | Peak position |
|---|---|
| US Billboard Top LP's | 183 |
| Canada RPM Top 100 Albums | 92 |

=== Singles ===
| Single | Year | Chart | Peak position |
|---|---|---|---|
| "The Windmills of Your Mind" | 1969 | US Billboard Hot 100 | 123 |

== Personnel ==
All credits are adapted from the liner notes of Windmills of Your Mind.

- Jimmie Rodgers – vocals
- Allen Stanton – producer
- Mort Garson – arranger, conductor
- Tom Wilkes – art direction
- Jim McCrary – back cover design
- Dick Bogert – engineer
- Ray Gerhardt – engineer
