= Make Me a Miracle =

"Make Me a Miracle" is a popular song. It was written by Al Hoffman, Dick Manning, and Hugo Peretti and Luigi Creatore and published in 1958.

The best-known recording of the song was done by Jimmie Rodgers, charting in 1958. It reached number 15 in Canada.
