= Abbey Records =

American record label

- Parent company: Peter Doraine, Inc.
- Founded: 1949
- Status: Defunct
- Genre: Various
- Country of origin: United States
- Location: New York City, New York, United States

Abbey Records was a record label active in the United States from roughly 1949 until 1953.

== History ==
Abbey was founded by Pete Doraine and originally operated in the Forest Hills, Queens, section of New York City but soon moved to 10th Avenue in the Manhattan borough in mid-1949 with Doraine serving as president. In 1950 Abbey's experienced its first (and biggest) hit in a recording of The Old Piano Roll Blues by J. Lawrence Cook. This disc, catalog number 15003, reached a peak position of 13, and had staying power for eleven weeks. Cook had recorded it in 1949, and then sold it to Abbey. Billboard had reviewed this record in its "Billboard Picks" as "spontaneous" and "rollicking" with "guts and drive," and evidently the public agreed. Abbey's next issue in the 15000-series was a Country hit. Slippin' Around With Jole Blon by Bud Messner and His Skyline Boys reached number 7 on the Country juke box charts in June 1950. By mid-year they had again moved headquarters, this time to 49th street, and had added two distributors to handle increased demand for their records. The year 1951 saw another hit by Cook, although minor, a cover of Down Yonder (catalog number 15053) that placed a position #22 on Billboard's charts. In 1951 the company located an operational nickelodeon in Richmond Hill, Queens on the advice of Cook, and signed a contract to record the machine. Because there was no extant rolls for the nickelodeon, Cook hand-produced rolls of two songs written specifically for the record. Executive Don Reed left for Europe in the summer of 1951 to acquire recordings for issue in the LP format. By 1952 Abbey was producing LP records, including a history of the newly crowned Queen Elizabeth II. Not entirely content with standard sales channels, Abbey signed a deal with the Pacquin company to record songs subtly promoting a hand cream product without directly naming the brand.

Besides Doraine, other executives of the company were Carlton "Kelly" Camarata (who was part-owner) as vice-president of Sales and Promotion, and Rudolph Toombs and Gus Statiras as A&R men. Camarata left in late 1950 to join MGM Records.

== Repertoire ==
Abbey issued records in many genres, including popular, country, gospel, R&B, jazz, and classical. The label dedicated numerical sequences to "Rhythm and Blues" (3000), Jazz (5000), "Spiritual" (7000), and Calypso (9000).

=== Lawrence (Piano Roll) Cook ===
Abbey's best-selling artist was Lawrence Cook, who did not directly record for the label, but through an arrangement with QRS Piano Rolls would make rolls by "cutting" the roll while playing the song, and then punching extra holes in the paper producing sounds not possible from a single pianist. These rolls would then be recorded, sometimes as a solo instrument, and often with other instruments such as a saxophone or with a vocal group dubbed the "Jim Dandies".

=== Other Artists ===
Other artists who appeared on Abbey include:

- Charlie Barnet
- Stuart Foster
- Nellie Hill
- Bob Howard
- King Odum
- Jesse Perry
- Ben Smith
- Charlie Spivak

== Related operations ==
Abbey Records also had a music publishing arm named Margold Music Corp.

In Canada, several Abbey recordings were released on the Quality Records label.
