= Takes Two to Tango (song) =

Song performed by Louis Armstrong

Single by Pearl Bailey
- B-side: "Let There Be Love"
- Released: 1952
- Genre: Pop
- Length: 2:54
- Label: Coral
- Songwriters: Al Hoffman; Dick Manning

"Takes Two to Tango" is a popular song, written by Al Hoffman and Dick Manning and published in 1952. Two versions of the song, by Pearl Bailey and by Louis Armstrong, charted in that year.

The recording by Pearl Bailey was released by Coral Records as catalog number 60817. It first reached the Billboard Best Seller chart on September 19, 1952, and lasted 17 weeks on the chart, peaking at No. 7.

The recording by Louis Armstrong was released by Decca Records as catalog number 28394. It reached the Billboard Best Seller chart on October 17, 1952, at No. 28; this was its only week on the chart.

== Other versions ==
- Bing Crosby and Rosemary Clooney recorded the song for Crosby's radio show on December 11, 1952 and it was subsequently released on the CD Bing & Rosie - The Crosby-Clooney Radio Sessions (2010).
- Lester Young's version was released by Verve Records. It was featured as a bonus track on the album Lester Young with the Oscar Peterson Trio (1954).
- Jack Jones - included in his album Shall We Dance? (1961).
- Ray Charles and Betty Carter - for their album Ray Charles and Betty Carter (1961)
- Ike & Tina Turner recorded a version that was released on Philles Records as a non-album single in 1966.

== See also ==
- It takes two to tango
