= Al Hoffman =

American songwriter and composer (1902–1960)

- Born: September 25, 1902; Minsk, Russian Empire
- Died: July 21, 1960 (aged 57) New York City, U.S.
- Occupation: Songwriter

Al Hoffman (September 25, 1902 – July 21, 1960) was an American songwriter and composer. He was a hit songwriter active in the 1930s, 1940s and 1950s, usually co-writing with others and responsible for number-one hits through each decade, many of which are still sung and recorded today. He was posthumously made a member of the Songwriters Hall of Fame in 1984. The popularity of Hoffman's song, "Mairzy Doats", co-written with Jerry Livingston and Milton Drake, was such that newspapers and magazines wrote about the craze. Time magazine titled one article "Our Mairzy Dotage". The New York Times simply wrote the headline, "That Song".

Hoffman's songs were recorded by singers such as Frank Sinatra ("Close To You", "I'm Gonna Live Until I Die"), Billy Eckstine ("I Apologize"), Perry Como ("Papa Loves Mambo", "Hot Diggity"), Ella Fitzgerald and Louis Armstrong ("Who Walks In When I Walk Out"), Nat "King" Cole, Tony Bennett, the Merry Macs, Sophie Tucker, Eartha Kitt, Patsy Cline, Patti Page ("Allegheny Moon") and Bette Midler. In October, 2007, Hoffman's "I'm Gonna Live Til I Die" was the lead single from Queen Latifah's album, Trav'lin' Light.

Though Hoffman had apparently little connection to Chicago, he wrote the Chicago Bears fight song "Bear Down, Chicago Bears" in 1941 under the pseudonym Jerry Downs.

== Life and career ==
Hoffman was born in Minsk in the Russian Empire (now Belarus), to a Jewish family. His parents moved to Seattle, Washington in the United States when he was six. After graduating from high school in Seattle, he started his own band, playing the drums, and moved to New York City in 1928 to pursue a music career. Though he continued playing the drums in night club bands and selling bagels door-to-door on Broadway, he began writing songs, collaborating with other songwriters such as Leon Carr, Leo Corday, Mann Curtis, Mack David, Milton Drake, Al Goodhart, Walter Kent, Sammy Lerner, Jerry Livingston, Al Sherman, Dick Manning, Bob Merrill, Ed Nelson, and Maurice Sigler.

In 1934, Hoffman moved to London to work on stage productions and movies, co-writing the hit songs "She Shall Have Music" and "Everything Stops for Tea". He returned to the U.S. three years later. In 1984, he was inducted into the Songwriters Hall of Fame. He has over 1,500 songs registered with A.S.C.A.P. Hoffman died in New York City of prostate cancer, and was buried in New Jersey.

== Partial list of published songs ==
=== Songs written by Al Hoffman and Dick Manning ===
- "Allegheny Moon" (1956)
- "Dennis The Menace Song" (1960)
- "Gilly Gilly Ossenfeffer Katzenellen Bogen by the Sea" (1954)
- "Hot Diggity" (1956)
- "I Can't Tell A Waltz From A Tango" (1954)
- "I Love Her, That's Why!" (for George Burns and Gracie Allen) (1955)
- "Mama, Teach Me to Dance" (1956)
- "Moon Talk" (1958)
- "O Dio Mio" (1960)
- "Takes Two to Tango" (1952)

=== Songs written by Al Hoffman, Dick Manning, and another collaborator ===
- "Are You Really Mine?" (1958) (with Mark Markwell)
- "Make Me a Miracle" (1958) (with Mark Markwell)
- "Mighty Pretty Waltz" (1950) (with Moon Mullican)
- "Oh-Oh, I'm Falling in Love Again" (1958) (with Mark Markwell)
- "Papa Loves Mambo" (1954) (with Bix Reichner)
- "Secretly" (1958) (with Mark Markwell)

=== Songs written by Al Hoffman, Mack David, and Jerry Livingston ===
- "Bibbidi-Bobbidi-Boo" (1948)
- "Chi-Baba, Chi-Baba" (1947)
- "A Dream Is a Wish Your Heart Makes" (1949)
- "Sing, Sweet Nightingale" (1950)
- "So This Is Love" (1950)
- "The Unbirthday Song" (1951)
- "Trick or Treat for Halloween" (1952)

=== Songs written by Al Hoffman, Maurice Sigler, and Al Goodhart ===
- "Everything Stops for Tea" (1935)
- "Everything's in Rhythm with My Heart" (1935)
- "I Saw Stars" (1934)
- "I Can Wiggle My Ears" (1935)
- "I'm in a Dancing Mood" (1936)
- "There Isn't Any Limit to My Love" (1936)
- "Why Don't You Practice What You Preach?"
- "Where There's You There's Me"

=== Others ===
- "Apple Blossoms and Chapel Bells"
- "Auf Wiedersehn, My Dear"
- "Bear Down, Chicago Bears" (1941)
- "Black-Eyed Susan Brown"
- "Close to You" (with Jerry Livingston and Carl Lampl)
- "Don't Stay Away Too Long"
- "Fit as a Fiddle" (1932) (with Arthur Freed and Al Goodhart)
- "From One Minute to Another"
- "Goodnight, Wherever You Are"
- "Heartaches" (1931) (lyrics by John Klenner)
- "I Apologize" (1931) (lyrics by Al Goodhart)
- "If I Knew You Were Comin' I'd've Baked a Cake" (1950) (with Bob Merrill and Clem Watts)
- "I Must Have One More Kiss Kiss Kiss"
- "I Paid For The Lie I Told You" (1939) (with Al Sherman and Enoch Light)
- "I'm Gonna Live Till I Die" (1955) (with Walter Kent and Mann Curtis)
- "If You Saw What I Saw In Nassau" (1949) (with Al Sherman and Clem Watts)
- "Little Man You've Had a Busy Day" (1934) [with Maurice Sigler] [music by Mabel Wayne]
- "Mairzy Doats" (1943) (with Jerry Livingston and Milton Drake)
- "Roll Up the Carpet" (1933) (with lyrics by Raymond Klages, music by Raymond Klages, Al Goodhart, and Hoffman)
- "She Broke My Heart in Three Places" (c. 1944) (with Jerry Livingston and Milton Drake)
- "Fuzzy Wuzzy" (1944) (with Jerry Livingston and Milton Drake)
- "The Story of a Starry Night" (1941) (with Jerry Livingston and Mann Curtis)
- "What's the Good Word, Mr. Bluebird?" (1943) (with Allan Roberts and Jerry Livingston)
- "A Whale of a Tale" (1954) (with Norman Gimbel)
- "Who Walks in When I Walk Out?" (1933) (with Ralph Freed and Al Goodhart)
- "Without Rhythm"
- "You Meet the Nicest People in Your Dreams" (1939) (with Al Goodhart and Manny Kurtz)
