= Franco-American (brand) =

Brand name

- Product type: Food company
- Current owner: Campbell's (1915–present)
- Country: United States
- Introduced: 1880
- Discontinued: 2004 (pasta products)

Franco-American is a brand name of Campbell's. Founded by Alphonse Biardot as Franco-American Food Company, it sells gravy and condensed soups; it was formerly used for SpaghettiOs and other pasta products until 2004 when it was replaced with the main Campbell's brand.

A can of Franco-American Spaghetti & Meatballs

== History ==
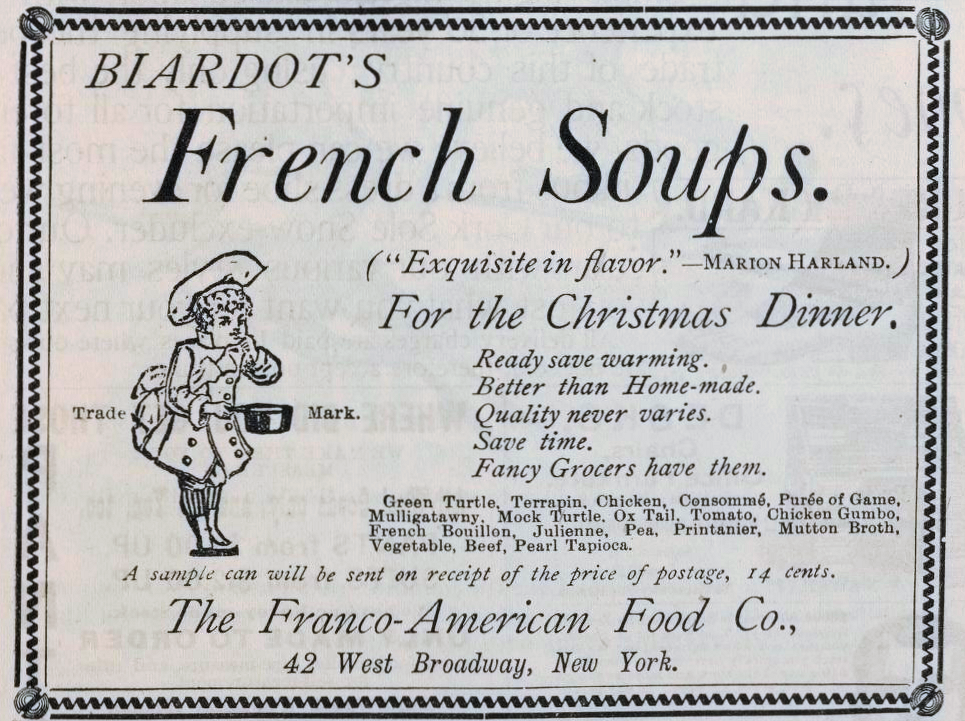
Advertisement for Biardot's French Soups, Lippincott's, December 1890

The company was founded as Franco-American Food Company by Alphonse Biardot, who immigrated to the United States from France in 1880. In 1886, he and his two sons opened a commercial kitchen in Jersey City, New Jersey, featuring the foods of his native country. The company proved a success, particularly with its line of canned soup and pasta, and it was acquired by Campbell's in 1915.

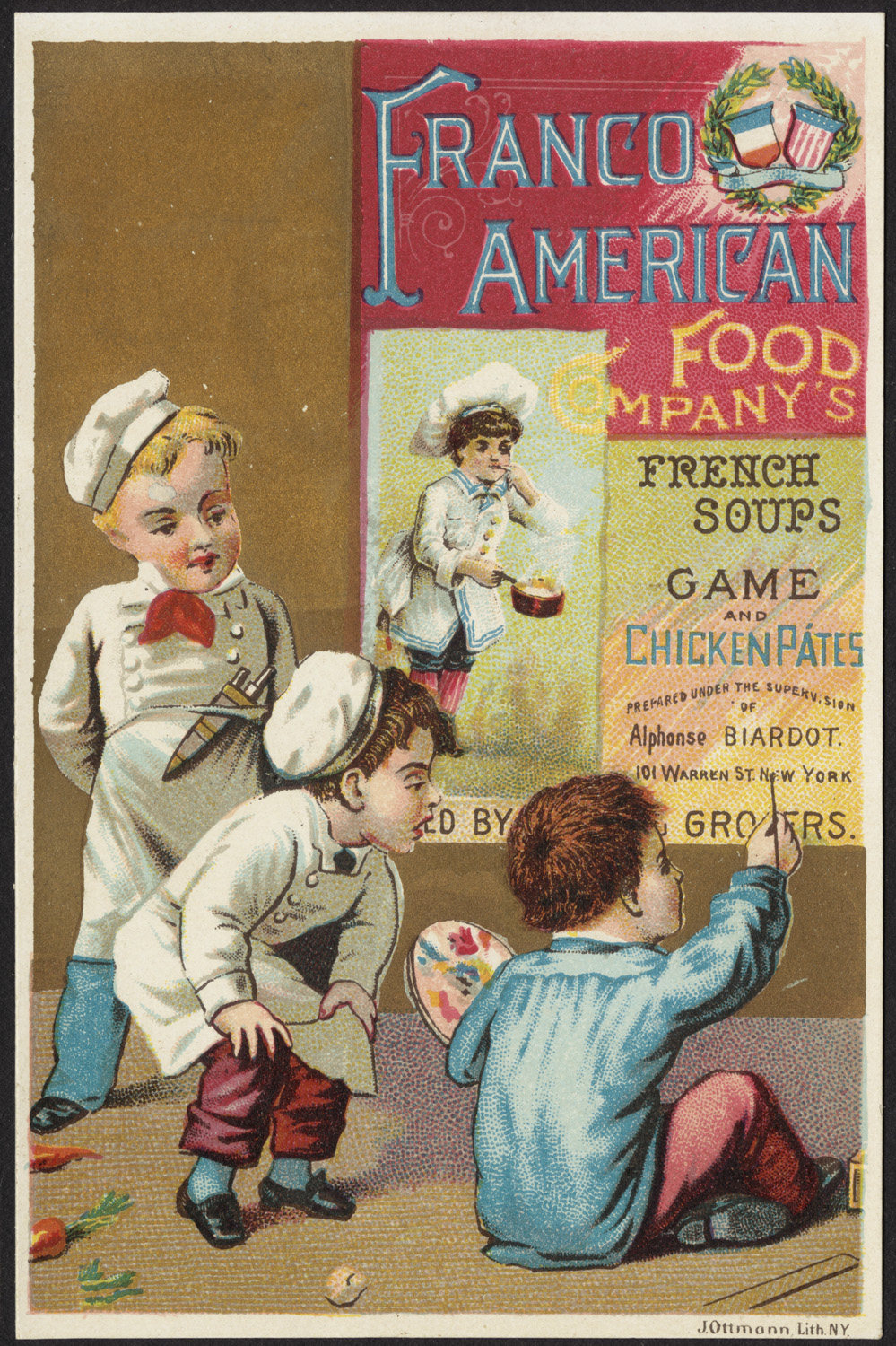
Early trade card for the company, prior to 1900

The Franco-American name was phased out over the next two decades for soup products and in the late 1990s for pasta products. However their product line was still sufficient to continue advertising well into the 1970s, with Barry Manilow performing their jingle "Who Can? Franco Ameri-Can". On November 18, 2004, Campbell's announced it was discontinuing the name for pasta products in favor of its own "to boost sales of what had been Franco-American's canned SpaghettiOs, RavioliOs, Macaroni and Cheese, and regular spaghetti, along with beef, chicken and turkey gravy varieties sold in cans and jars".

As of 2023, the Campbell Soup Company continues to sell gravy products under the Franco-American name, along with a small line of condensed soups that are similar to soups sold under the Campbell's brand.

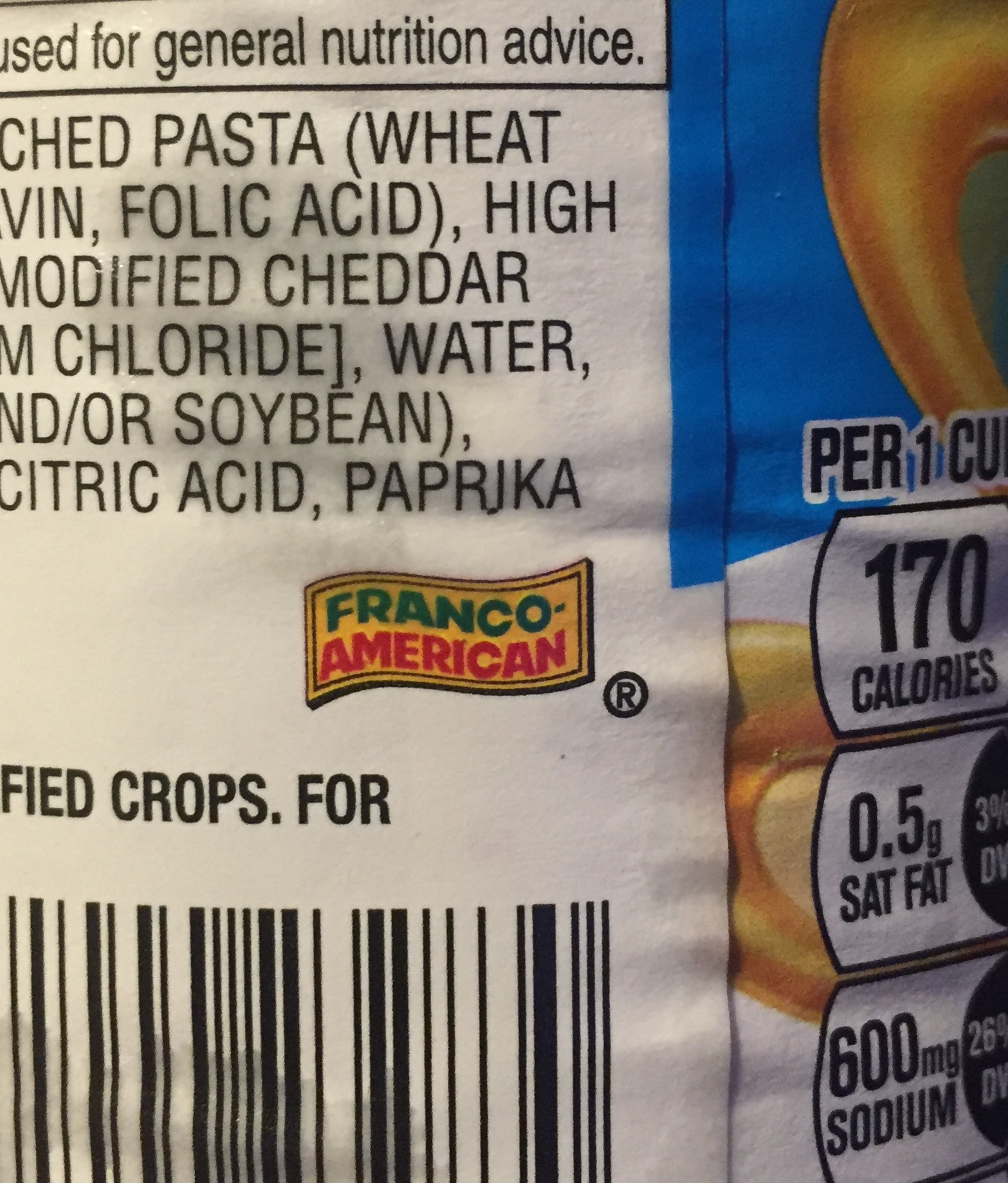
The last vestige of the Franco-American logo, on a can of SpaghettiOs, 2020

Their logo can still be found on the back of SpaghettiOs cans, next to the copyright.
