= Maurice Sigler =

American musician and songwriter (1901–1961)

Maurice Sigler (November 30, 1901 – February 6, 1961) was an American banjoist and songwriter.

Sigler was born in New York City but moved to Birmingham, Alabama at an early age, and received his musical tuition there. In the 1920s, Sigler was a member of the Birmingham-based band of reedman Jack Linx, which made a series of field trip recordings in Atlanta for Okeh Records from 1924 to 1927. At the first of these sessions Sigler also recorded as the nominal leader of a band called "Sigler's Birmingham Merrymakers", probably a pick-up group.

From the 1930s onwards, Sigler focused more on work as a song lyricist, contributing lyrics to songs such as "I Saw Stars", "Everything's In Rhythm With My Heart", "Everything Stops For Tea" (all three with Al Goodhart and Al Hoffman), "Little Man, You've Had A Busy Day" (with Al Hoffman and Mabel Wayne) and "Lolly Lolly Loo" (with David Mann). He spent the years 1934 to 1937 in England, contributing lyrics to stage shows and films, including several songs for the 1935 Jack Hylton feature She Shall Have Music.

Sigler died in Flushing, Queens in 1961.

== Sources ==
- Joe Moore: liner notes for the CD Jack Linx & Maurice Sigler - Recorded in Atlanta 1924-1927 (Jazz Oracle BDW 8018)
- Maurice Sigler at Songwriters Hall of Fame
- Soundtrack listing for She Shall Have Music at IMDb
