= Dick Manning =

Russian-American songwriter (1912–1991)

- Dick Manning

Background information
- Born: Samuel Medoff; June 12, 1912; Gomel, Russian Empire
- Died: April 11, 1991 (aged 78) Marietta, Georgia, U.S.
- Occupation: Songwriter

Dick Manning (born Samuel Medoff (Самуил Медов), June 12, 1912 – April 11, 1991) was a Russian-American songwriter, best known for his many collaborations with Al Hoffman. Manning composed the first full-length musical to be broadcast on television. The Boys From Boise aired on the DuMont Television Network in 1944.

== Early years ==
Manning was born in Gomel, Russian Empire, to a Jewish family, and came to the United States with his family when he was six years old. He studied at the Juilliard School of Music. Manning changed his name from Medoff in 1948, although he continued also to play and record in Yiddish under his birth name.

== Yiddish swing ==
In the early 1940s, he had a radio show on WHN radio in New York called Sam Medoff and His Yiddish Swing Orchestra; he performed with his band, "The Yiddish Swingtet". Manning and the band were also regulars on "Yiddish Melodies in Swing", which was also broadcast on WHN. The 15 minute weekly radio show, which blended traditional Yiddish folk music with swing and jazz, got its start on the station in 1938. Medoff and the Swingtet were hired to give a new twist to the traditional songs, as well as introduce new popular songs performed in Yiddish. The Barry Sisters (Claire and Merna) were the vocalists for the program. The radio show was originally done live at the Lowes State Theatre every Sunday at 1PM; it aired until 1955. Medoff also played piano and organ for Yiddish crooner Seymour Rexite's radio show.

== Songwriting and composing ==
Manning was the co-writer of many popular songs, among them: "Takes Two to Tango", "Fascination", "Hot Diggity" and "Papa Loves Mambo". They were recorded by artists such as Perry Como, Sammy Kaye, and Kate Smith. Manning's songs have been published in 27 languages. In 1956, Manning shared a late-night subway ride with Perry Como's music publisher, Mickey Glass. As the two men talked, Glass mentioned a need for a new novelty song for Como. Manning said he had just made a demo recording of something like that which had yet to be heard by anyone else. Glass arranged to hear Manning's demo the next day; Como's recording of "Hot Diggity" was the result of that chance meeting of Manning and Glass.

Manning also composed The Boys From Boise, which was the story of a troupe of show girls who were stranded on an Idaho ranch. The girls take jobs as cowgirls on the ranch in an effort to raise enough money to return home. This was the first full-length television musical, and was presented on the DuMont Television Network in 1944. The television presentation of the musical was sponsored by Esquire magazine. Manning appeared earlier in that year on DuMont's Key-Bored Televisual Presentations as a pianist. Manning also was an arranger and vocal coach, and wrote radio jingles.

Manning, the father of two daughters and a son, died of diabetes-related complications in Marietta, Georgia on April 11, 1991.

== Published songs ==
=== Songs written by Al Hoffman and Dick Manning ===
- "Allegheny Moon" (1956)
- "Dennis the Menace" (1960)
- "Gilly Gilly Ossenfeffer Katzenellen Bogen by the Sea" (1954)
- "Hawaiian Wedding Song" (1958-English version)
- "Hot Diggity" (1956)
- "I Can't Tell a Waltz from a Tango" (1954)
- "I Love Her, That's Why!" (for George Burns and Gracie Allen) (1955)
- "Mama, Teach Me to Dance" (1956)
- "Mi Casa, Su Casa (My House Is Your House)" (1957)
- "Moon Talk" (1958)
- "O Dio Mio" (1960)
- "Takes Two to Tango" (1952)

=== Songs written by Al Hoffman, Dick Manning and another collaborator ===
- "Are You Really Mine?" (1958) (with Mark Markwell)
- "Make Me a Miracle" (1958) (with Mark Markwell)
- "Oh-Oh, I'm Falling in Love Again" (1958) (with Mark Markwell)
- "Papa Loves Mambo" (1954) (with Bix Reichner)
- "Secretly" (1958) (with Mark Markwell)

=== Other songs ===
- "Jilted" (with Robert Colby)
- "Fascination" (lyrics)
- "Like I Do"
- "Not I" (with Sammy Gallop)
- "Walkin' With My Honey" (with Buddy Kaye)
- "Start the Day with a Song" (with Buddy Kaye)
- "Morning Side of the Mountain"

== Work on Broadway ==
- The Fifth Season (1975) - musical - composer and lyricist
