= Billboard year-end top 50 R&B singles of 1958 =

Billboard Top R&B Records of 1958 is the year-end chart compiled by Billboard magazine ranking the top rhythm and blues singles of 1958. Due to the extent of cross-over between the R&B and pop charts in 1958, the song's rank, if any, in the year-end pop chart is also provided.

R&B rank	Pop rank	Title	Artist(s)	Label
1	NR	"What Am I Living For"/"Hang Up My Rock & Roll Shoes"	Chuck Willis	Atlantic
2	23	"Rockin' Robin	Bobby Day	Class
3	3	"Don't"/"I Beg of You"	Elvis Presley	RCA Victor
4	31	"Looking Back"/"Do I Like It"	Nat King Cole	Capitol
5	2	"All I Have to Do Is Dream"	The Everly Brothers	Cadence
6	9	"It's All in the Game"	Tommy Edwards	M-G-M
7	26	"Just a Dream"	Jimmy Clanton	Ace
8	21	"Yakety Yak"	The Coasters	Atco
9	4	"Witch Doctor"	David Seville	Liberty
10	15	"Little Star"	The Elegants	Apt
11	8	"Tequila"	The Champs	Challenge
12	NR	"Win Your Love for Me"	Sam Cooke	Keen
13	13	"Bird Dog"/"Devoted to You"	The Everly Brothers	Cadence
14	16	"Twilight Time"	The Platters	Mercury
15	40	"My True Love"/"Leroy"	Jack Scott	Carlton
16	20	"At the Hop"	Danny & the Juniors	ABC-Paramount
17	14	"Get a Job"	The Silhouettes	Ember
18	24	"Poor Little Fool"	Ricky Nelson	Imperial
19	34	"Tears on My Pillow"	Little Anthony and the Imperials	End
20	5	"Patricia"	Perez Prado	RCA Victor
21	30	"Topsy" (parts I & II)	Cozy Cole	Love
22	29	"Sweet Little Sixteen"	Chuck Berry	Chess
23	NR	"For Your Love"	Ed Townsend	Capitol
24	NR	"Willie and the Hand Jive"	The Johnny Otis Show	Capitol
25	NR	"Talk to Me, Talk to Me"	Little Willie John	King
26	NR	"Johnny B. Goode"	Chuck Berry	Chess
27	NR	"Maybe"	The Chantels	End
28	47	"Oh, Julie"	The Crescendos	Nasco
29	18	"He's Got the Whole World in His Hands"	Laurie London	Capitol
30	NR	"Don't Let Go"	Roy Hamilton	Epic
31	35	"Short Shorts"	The Royal Teens	ABC-Paramount
32	32	"The Book of Love"	The Monotones	Argo
33	NR	"Jennie Lee"	Jan & Arnie	Arwin
34	38	"Splish Splash"	Bobby Darin	Atco
35	50	"Peggy Sue"	Buddy Holly	Coral
36	42	"Do You Want to Dance"	Bobby Freeman	Josie
37	49	"Hard Headed Woman"	Elvis Presley	RCA Victor
38	22	"Wear My Ring Around Your Neck"	Elvis Presley	RCA Victor
39	48	"The Stroll"	The Diamonds	Mercury
40	19	"Secretly"	Jimmie Rodgers	Roulette
41	41	"Endless Sleep"	Jody Reynolds	Demon
42	37	"Lollipop"	The Chordettes	Cadence
43	NR	"A Lover's Question"	Clyde McPhatter	Atlantic
44	NR	"Raunchy"	Ernie Freeman	Imperial
45	NR	"Don't You Just Know It"	Huey "Piano" Smith	Ace
46	NR	"To Be Loved"	Jackie Wilson	Brunswick
47	NR	"Big Man"	The Four Preps	Capitol
48	39	"Who's Sorry Now?"	Connie Francis	M-G-M
49	NR	"I'm Gonna Get My Baby"	Jimmy Reed	Vee Jay
50	1	"Volare"	Domenico Modugno	Decca

== See also ==
- List of Billboard number-one R&B songs of 1958
- Billboard year-end top 50 singles of 1958
- 1958 in music
