= List of Billboard Hot 100 top-ten singles in 1958 =

This is a list of singles that have peaked in the top 10 of the Billboard Hot 100 during 1958.

== Top-ten singles ==
Top ten entry date	Single	Artist(s)	Peak	Peak date	Weeks in top ten
August 4	"Poor Little Fool"	Ricky Nelson	1	August 4	6
August 4	"Patricia"	Pérez Prado	2	August 4	6
August 4	"Splish Splash"	Bobby Darin	3	August 4	3
August 4	"Hard Headed Woman"	Elvis Presley	4	August 4	2
August 4	"When"	Kalin Twins	5	August 4	5
August 4	"Rebel 'Rouser"	Duane Eddy	6	August 4	3
August 4	"Yakety Yak"	The Coasters	7	August 4	1
August 4	"My True Love"	Jack Scott	3	August 18	6
August 4	"Willie and the Hand Jive"	The Johnny Otis Show	9	August 4	2
August 4	"Fever"	Peggy Lee	8	August 25	3
August 11	"Nel Blu Dipinto Di Blu (Volare)"	Domenico Modugno	1	August 18	10
August 11	"Just a Dream"	Jimmy Clanton	4	August 25	8
August 18	"Little Star"	The Elegants	1	August 25	9
August 25	"Bird Dog"	The Everly Brothers	2	September 15	11
August 25	"Born Too Late"	The Poni-Tails	7	September 15	3
September 1	"Ginger Bread"	Frankie Avalon	9	September 1	2
September 1	"Are You Really Mine?"	Jimmie Rodgers	10	September 1	1
September 8	"Rockin' Robin"	Bobby Day	2	October 13	10
September 8	"Western Movies"	The Olympics	8	September 15	2
September 15	"It's All in the Game"	Tommy Edwards	1	September 29	12
September 15	"Tears on My Pillow"	Little Anthony and the Imperials	4	October 13	8
September 15	"Susie Darlin'"	Robin Luke	5	October 13	7
September 22	"Devoted to You"	The Everly Brothers	10	September 22	1
September 29	"Summertime Blues"	Eddie Cochran	8	September 29	2
September 29	"Near You"	Roger Williams	10	September 29	3
October 6	"Tea for Two Cha Cha"	Tommy Dorsey	7	November 3	6
October 13	"The End"	Earl Grant	7	October 13	3
October 20	"Topsy, Part 2"	Cozy Cole	3	October 20	8
October 20	"It's Only Make Believe"	Conway Twitty	1	November 10	10
October 20	"Tom Dooley"	The Kingston Trio	1	November 17	12
October 20	"Chantilly Lace"	The Big Bopper	6	November 3	5
November 10	"To Know Him Is to Love Him"	The Teddy Bears	1	December 1	11
November 10	"I Got a Feeling"	Ricky Nelson	10	November 10	2
November 17	"Beep Beep"	The Playmates	4	December 1	7
November 17	"Lonesome Town"	Ricky Nelson	7	December 1	8
November 17	"Queen of the Hop"	Bobby Darin	9	November 17	3
November 24	"One Night"	Elvis Presley	4	December 15	8
November 24	"I Got Stung"	Elvis Presley	8	November 24	4
December 1	"Problems"	The Everly Brothers	2	December 15	7
December 15	"The Chipmunk Song (Christmas Don't Be Late)"	The Chipmunks with David Seville	1	December 22	6

=== 1959 peaks ===
List of Billboard Hot 100 top ten singles in 1958 which peaked in 1959
Top ten entry date	Single	Artist(s)	Peak	Peak date	Weeks in top ten
December 15	"Smoke Gets in Your Eyes"	The Platters	1	January 19	10
December 22	"A Lover's Question"	Clyde McPhatter	6	January 19	7
December 29	"Whole Lotta Lovin'"	Fats Domino	6	January 12	5

== See also ==
- 1958 in music
- List of Billboard Hot 100 number ones of 1958
- Billboard Year-End Hot 100 singles of 1958
