= Billboard year-end top 50 singles of 1958 =

Ranking of recorded music

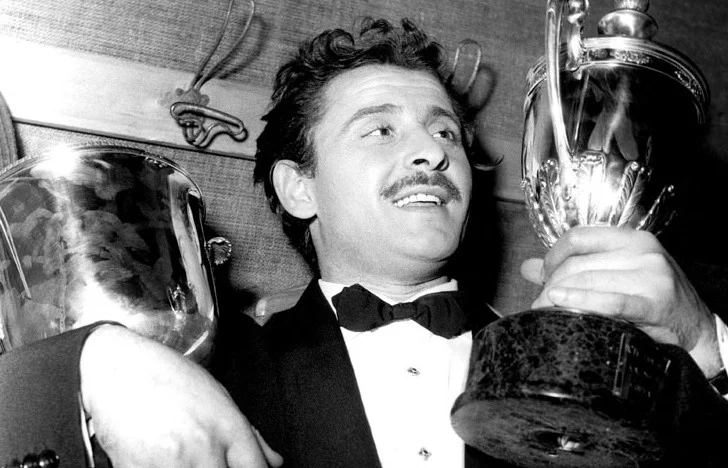
"Volare (Nel blu dipinto di blu)" by Domenico Modugno was the number one song of 1958.

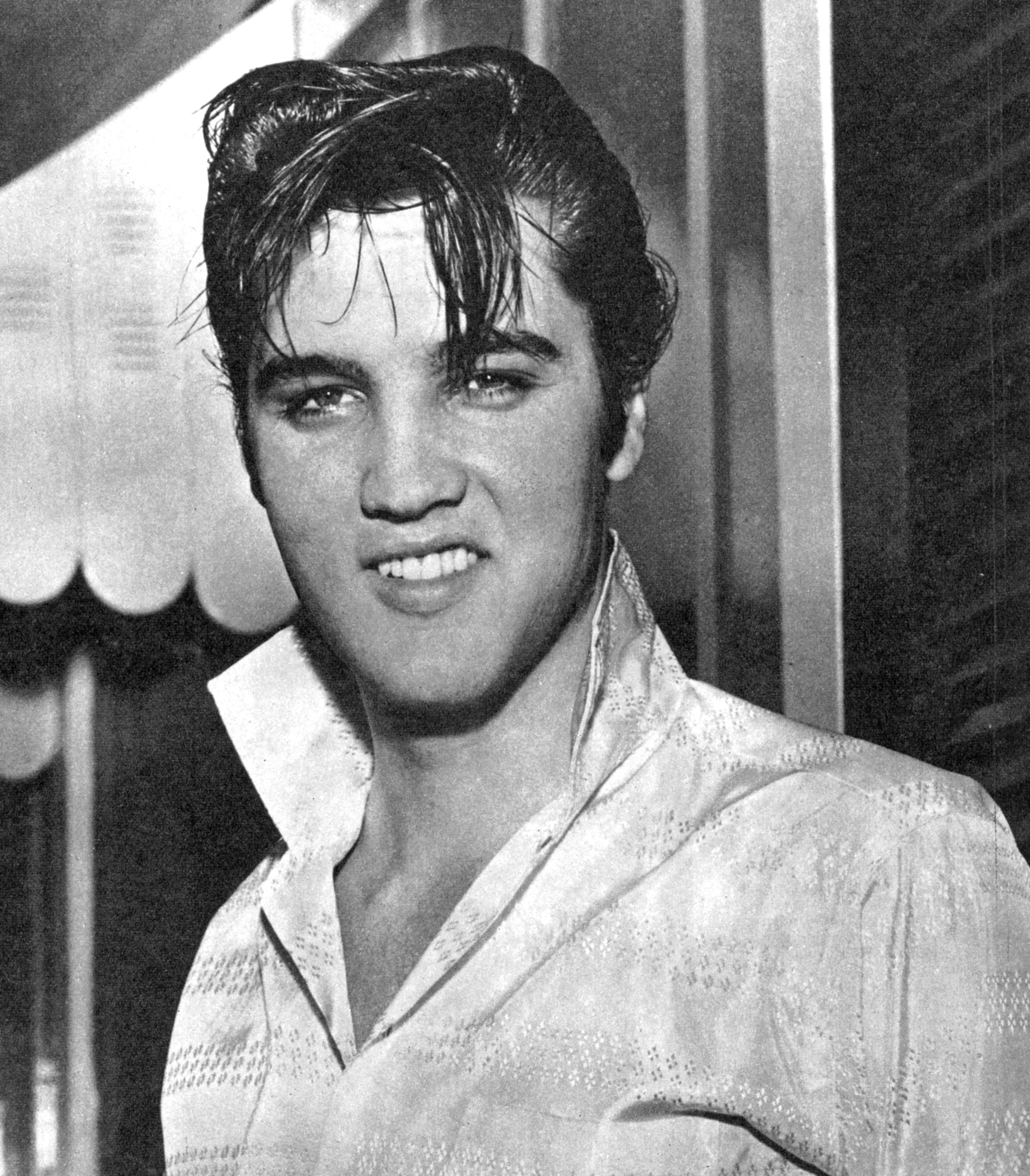
Elvis Presley had three songs on the year-end top 50, the most of any artist in 1958.

This is a list of Billboard magazine's top 50 pop singles of 1958.

| No. | Title | Artist(s) |
|---|---|---|
| 1 | "Volare (Nel blu dipinto di blu)" | Domenico Modugno |
| 2 | "All I Have to Do Is Dream" / "Claudette" | The Everly Brothers |
| 3 | "Don't" / "I Beg of You" | Elvis Presley |
| 4 | "Witch Doctor" | Ross Bagdasarian |
| 5 | "Patricia" | Perez Prado |
| 6 | "Sail Along, Silv'ry Moon" / "Raunchy" | Billy Vaughn |
| 7 | "Catch a Falling Star" / "Magic Moments" | Perry Como |
| 8 | "Tequila" | The Champs |
| 9 | "It's All in the Game" | Tommy Edwards |
| 10 | "Return to Me" | Dean Martin |
| 11 | "It's Only Make Believe" | Conway Twitty |
| 12 | "The Purple People Eater" | Sheb Wooley |
| 13 | "Bird Dog" / "Devoted to You" | The Everly Brothers |
| 14 | "Get a Job" | The Silhouettes |
| 15 | "Little Star" | The Elegants |
| 16 | "Twilight Time" | The Platters |
| 17 | "Stood Up" / "Waitin' in School" | Ricky Nelson |
| 18 | "He's Got the Whole World in His Hands" | Laurie London |
| 19 | "Secretly" | Jimmie Rodgers |
| 20 | "At the Hop" | Danny & the Juniors |
| 21 | "Yakety Yak" | The Coasters |
| 22 | "Wear My Ring Around Your Neck" / "Doncha' Think It's Time" | Elvis Presley |
| 23 | "Rockin' Robin" / "Over and Over" | Bobby Day |
| 24 | "Poor Little Fool" | Ricky Nelson |
| 25 | "A Wonderful Time Up There" / "It's Too Soon to Know" | Pat Boone |
| 26 | "Just a Dream" | Jimmy Clanton |
| 27 | "Sugartime" | The McGuire Sisters |
| 28 | "Tom Dooley" | The Kingston Trio |
| 29 | "Sweet Little Sixteen" | Chuck Berry |
| 30 | "Topsy II" / "Topsy I" | Cozy Cole |
| 31 | "Looking Back" / "Do I Like It" | Nat King Cole |
| 32 | "Book of Love" | The Monotones |
| 33 | "Tea for Two Cha Cha" | Tommy Dorsey Orchestra & Warren Covington |
| 34 | "Tears on My Pillow" | Little Anthony and the Imperials |
| 35 | "Short Shorts" | The Royal Teens |
| 36 | "Great Balls of Fire" | Jerry Lee Lewis |
| 37 | "Lollipop" | The Chordettes |
| 38 | "Splish Splash" | Bobby Darin |
| 39 | "Who's Sorry Now?" | Connie Francis |
| 40 | "My True Love" / "Leroy" | Jack Scott |
| 41 | "Endless Sleep" | Jody Reynolds |
| 42 | "Do You Want to Dance" | Bobby Freeman |
| 43 | "When" | The Kalin Twins |
| 44 | "To Know Him Is to Love Him" | The Teddy Bears |
| 45 | "April Love" | Pat Boone |
| 46 | "Rebel-'Rouser" | Duane Eddy |
| 47 | "Oh Julie" | The Crescendos |
| 48 | "The Stroll" | The Diamonds |
| 49 | "Hard Headed Woman" / "Don't Ask Me Why" | Elvis Presley |
| 50 | "Peggy Sue" | Buddy Holly |
| 50 | "Oh Lonesome Me" | Don Gibson |

== See also ==
- 1958 in music
- List of Billboard number-one singles of 1958
- List of Billboard Hot 100 top-ten singles in 1958
