= List of summer hits =

List of hit songs by country

This is a list of summer hits in order by country. A summer hit is a hit song that reaches its peak in popularity during the summer months. This is determined through analytical data such as radio airplay, sales data, streaming activity, and web searches.

Songs that became summer hits in more than one country are listed in this article either under the country where it was produced (if they became a hit in that country) or the country where it first became a summer hit (if they were not a hit in their country of origin during the summer).

== Brazil ==
- 1989: "Lambada" by Kaoma

== Canada ==
- 1999 "Steal My Sunshine" by Len
- 2002 "Complicated" by Avril Lavigne
- 2012 "Call Me Maybe" by Carly Rae Jepsen

== Cuba ==
- 1958 "Patricia" by Perez Prado And His Orchestra

== Ireland ==
- 2024 "Too Sweet" by Hozier

== Italy ==
- 1958 "Nel Blu Dipinto Di Blu (Volare)" by Domenico Modugno

== Romania ==
- 2004 "Dragostea Din Tei" by O-Zone

== South Korea ==
- 2012 "Gangnam Style" by Psy
- 2021 "Butter" by BTS

== Spain ==
- 1996 "Macarena" by Los Del Rio
- 2001 "El baile del gorila" by Melody
- 2002 "The Ketchup Song (Asereje)" by Las Ketchup
- 2005 "La Camisa Negra" by Juanes
- 2019 "Con Altura" by Rosalía, J Balvin and El Guincho
- 2024 "Si antes te hubiera conocido" by Karol G

== Sweden ==
- 2005: "Axel F" by Crazy Frog;

== United Kingdom ==
- 1964 "Hard Day's Night" by The Beatles
- 1965 "(I Can't Get No) Satisfaction" by The Rolling Stones
- 1966 "Yesterday" by The Beatles
- 1969 "Get Back" by The Beatles
- 1969 "Honky Tonk Women" by The Rolling Stones
- 1976 "Don't Go Breaking My Heart" by Elton John & Kiki Dee
- 2022 "As It Was" by Harry Styles
- 2022 "Heat Waves" by Glass Animals
- 2022 "Late Night Talking" by Harry Styles
- 2022 "Running Up That Hill" by Kate Bush

== United States ==
=== 1950s ===
- 1955 "Rock Around the Clock" by Bill Haley and the Comets
- 1956 "Don't Be Cruel" by Elvis Presley
- 1958 "Bird Dog" by The Everly Brothers
- 1958 "Just a Dream" by Jimmy Clanton
- 1958 "Little Star" by The Elegants
- 1958 "My True Love" by Jack Scott
- 1958 "Poor Little Fool" by Ricky Nelson
- 1958 "The Purple People Eater" by Sheb Wooley
- 1958 "Rebel-'Rouser" by Duane Eddy and Lee Hazlewood
- 1958 "Splish Splash" by Bobby Darin
- 1958 "When" by the Kalin Twins
- 1959 "The Battle of New Orleans" by Johnny Horton

=== 1960s ===
- 1960 "Itsy Bitsy Teenie Weenie Yellow Polkadot Bikini" by Bryan Hyland
- 1964 "Where Did Our Love Go" by The Supremes
- 1966 "Summer in the City" by The Lovin' Spoonful
- 1967 "Light My Fire" by The Doors

=== 1970s ===
- 1978 "Shadow Dancing" by Andy Gibb
- 1979 "Bad Girls" by Donna Summer

=== 1980s ===
- 1981 "Bette Davis Eyes" by Kim Carnes
- 1981 "Endless Love" by Diana Ross and Lionel Richie
- 1986 "Papa Don't Preach" by Madonna
- 1987 "La Bamba" by Los Lobos

=== 1990s ===
- 1999 "Livin’ La Vida Loca" by Ricky Martin

=== 2000s ===
- 2000 "It's Gonna Be Me" by NSYNC
- 2000 "Thong Song" by Sisqó
- 2000 "Try Again" by Aaliyah
- 2001 "Hanging by a Moment" by Lifehouse
- 2001 "Let Me Blow Ya Mind" by Eve ft. Gwen Stefani
- 2001 "U Remind Me" by Usher
- 2003 "Crazy in Love" by Beyoncé ft. Jay-Z
- 2003 "Magic Stick" by Lil' Kim ft. 50 Cent
- 2004 "Hollaback Girl" by Gwen Stefani
- 2004 "Slow Motion" by Juvenile ft. Soulja Slim
- 2005 "We Belong Together" by Mariah Carey
- 2006 "Crazy" by Gnarls Barkley
- 2006 "Hips Don't Lie" by Shakira ft. Wyclef Jean
- 2006 "London Bridge" by Fergie
- 2006 "Promiscuous" by Nelly Furtado ft. Timbaland
- 2007 "Big Girls Don't Cry" by Fergie
- 2007 "Umbrella" by Rihanna
- 2008 "I Kissed a Girl" by Katy Perry
- 2008 "Lollipop" by Lil Wayne ft. Static Major
- 2009 "Boom Boom Pow" by The Black Eyed Peas
- 2009 "I Gotta Feeling" by The Black Eyed Peas

=== 2010s ===
- 2010 "California Gurls" by Katy Perry
- 2011 "Party Rock Anthem" by LMFAO
- 2014 "Fancy" by Iggy Azalea ft. Charli XCX
- 2014 "Problem" by Ariana Grande ft. Iggy Azalea
- 2016 "One Dance" by Drake
- 2016 "Can't Stop the Feeling!" by Justin Timberlake
- 2017 "Despacito" by Luis Fonsi and Daddy Yankee ft. Justin Bieber
- 2018 "In My Feelings" by Drake
- 2018 "I Like It" by Cardi B, Bad Bunny and J Balvin
- 2018 "One Kiss" by Calvin Harris and Dua Lipa
- 2019 "Old Town Road" by Lil Nas X and Billy Ray Cyrus
- 2019 "Señorita" by Shawn Mendes and Camila Cabello

=== 2020s ===
- 2022 "About Damn Time" by Lizzo
- 2022 "Break My Soul" by Beyoncé
- 2022 "First Class" by Jack Harlow
- 2022 "Me Porto Bonito" by Bad Bunny and Chencho Corleone
- 2022 "Tití Me Preguntó" by Bad Bunny
- 2022 "Wait for U" by Future ft. Drake and Tems
- 2023 "All My Life" by Lil Durk ft. J. Cole
- 2023 "Calm Down" by Rema and Selena Gomez
- 2023 "Cruel Summer" by Taylor Swift
- 2023 "Fast Car" by Luke Combs
- 2023 "Flowers" by Miley Cyrus
- 2023 "FukUMean" by Gunna
- 2023 "Karma" by Taylor Swift ft. Ice Spice
- 2023 "Kill Bill" by SZA ft. Doja Cat
- 2023 "Last Night" by Morgan Wallen
- 2024 "A Bar Song (Tipsy)" by Shaboozey
- 2024 "Beautiful Things" by Benson Boone
- 2024 "Birds of a Feather" by Billie Eilish
- 2024 "Espresso" by Sabrina Carpenter
- 2024 "I Had Some Help" by Post Malone ft. Morgan Wallen
- 2024 "Lose Control" by Teddy Swims
- 2024 "Million Dollar Baby" by Tommy Richman
- 2024 "Not Like Us" by Kendrick Lamar
- 2024 "Please Please Please" by Sabrina Carpenter
- 2025 "Die with a Smile" by Lady Gaga and Bruno Mars
- 2025 "Golden" by Ejae, Audrey Nuna, and Rei Ami
- 2025 "Love Me Not" by Ravyn Lenae
- 2025 "Luther" by Kendrick Lamar and SZA
- 2025 "Manchild" by Sabrina Carpenter
- 2025 "Ordinary" by Alex Warren
- 2025 "Pink Pony Club" by Chappell Roan
- 2025 "What I Want" by Morgan Wallen ft. Tate McRae
