= List of Billboard number-one R&B songs of 1958 =

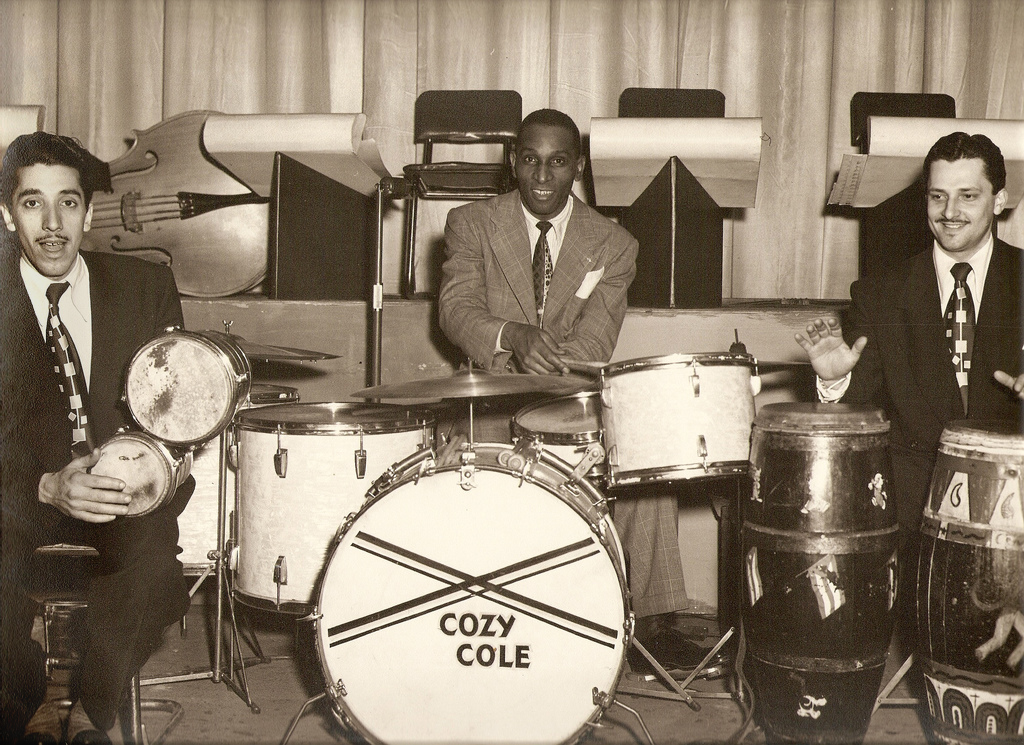
Cozy Cole (center) was the second artist to top the combined Hot R&B Sides chart, introduced in October.

At the start of 1958, Billboard magazine published two charts specifically covering the top-performing songs in the United States in rhythm and blues (R&B) and related African-American-oriented music genres. The R&B Best Sellers in Stores chart ranked records based on their "current national selling importance at the retail level", based on a survey of record retailers "with a high volume of sales in rhythm and blues records". The Most Played R&B by Jockeys chart ranked songs based on the "number of plays on disk jockey radio shows" according to a weekly survey of "top disk jockey shows in all key markets". With effect from the October 20 issue of Billboard, the magazine discontinued both charts and combined sales and airplay into one chart called Hot R&B Sides, which has been continuously published since that date, since 2005 under the title Hot R&B/Hip-Hop Songs.

In the issue of Billboard dated January 6, Danny & the Juniors were at number one on the Best Sellers chart with "At the Hop" and Ernie Freeman held the top spot on the Jockeys chart with "Raunchy". Two weeks later, Freeman's single was replaced at number one by Bill Justis's recording of the same tune. The two versions of "Raunchy" were among nine songs which reached number one on the Jockeys chart but failed to top the Best Sellers listing. Conversely, four singles which reached the peak position on the sales chart did not top the airplay-based listing. "Yakety Yak" by the Coasters had the year's longest unbroken run at number one on the Best Sellers chart, spending six consecutive weeks in the top spot. The Silhouettes had the longest uninterrupted run atop the Jockeys chart, spending six weeks in the peak position with "Get a Job"; "Yakety Yak" also spent six weeks at number one on that listing, but not consecutively.

Elvis Presley, known as the "King of Rock and Roll", gained his final R&B number one in 1958 when "Wear My Ring Around Your Neck" topped the Jockeys chart. Presley had achieved several R&B number ones over the preceding two years, but as his music moved away from his rock and roll roots and into more sedate directions in the early 1960s he would experience less success on the R&B chart, and after 1963 he would not enter the listing again. In contrast to Presley's lengthy and hugely successful career, both the Silhouettes and the Elegants reached number one in 1958 with the only singles of their respective careers to enter any of Billboard's charts: both the former group's "Get a Job" and the latter's "Little Star" topped both R&B charts as well as the magazine's pop listings, but neither of the two doo-wop groups would ever chart again. Justis, Pérez Prado, and the Kalin Twins also reached number one in 1958 with their only R&B chart entries, although they did place other songs in the pop charts. The final number one on the Best Sellers chart was "It's All in the Game" by Tommy Edwards, and the last chart-topper on the Jockeys listing was Bobby Day's "Rock-in-Robin". The following week, Day's song became the first number one on the combined Hot R&B Sides chart. The year's final R&B chart-topper was "Lonely Teardrops" by Jackie Wilson, which reached the peak position in the issue of Billboard dated December 15 and stayed there for the remainder of the year.

== Chart history ==
=== R&B Best Sellers in Stores and R&B Most Played by Jockeys ===
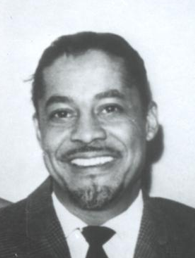
Ernie Freeman's version of "Raunchy" was displaced from number one by Bill Justis's version of the same tune.

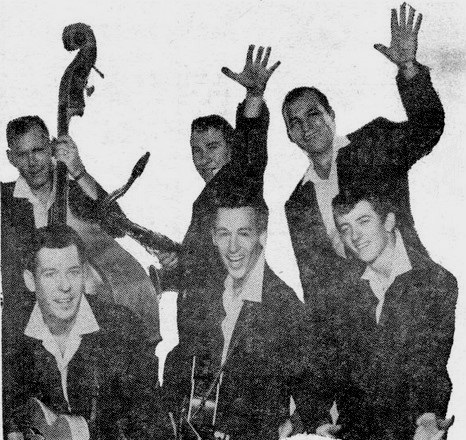
The Champs reached number one with "Tequila".

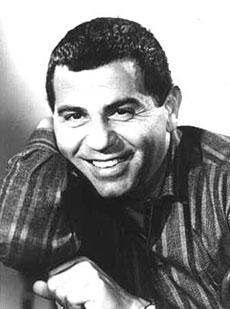
David Seville gained a number one with the novelty song "Witch Doctor".

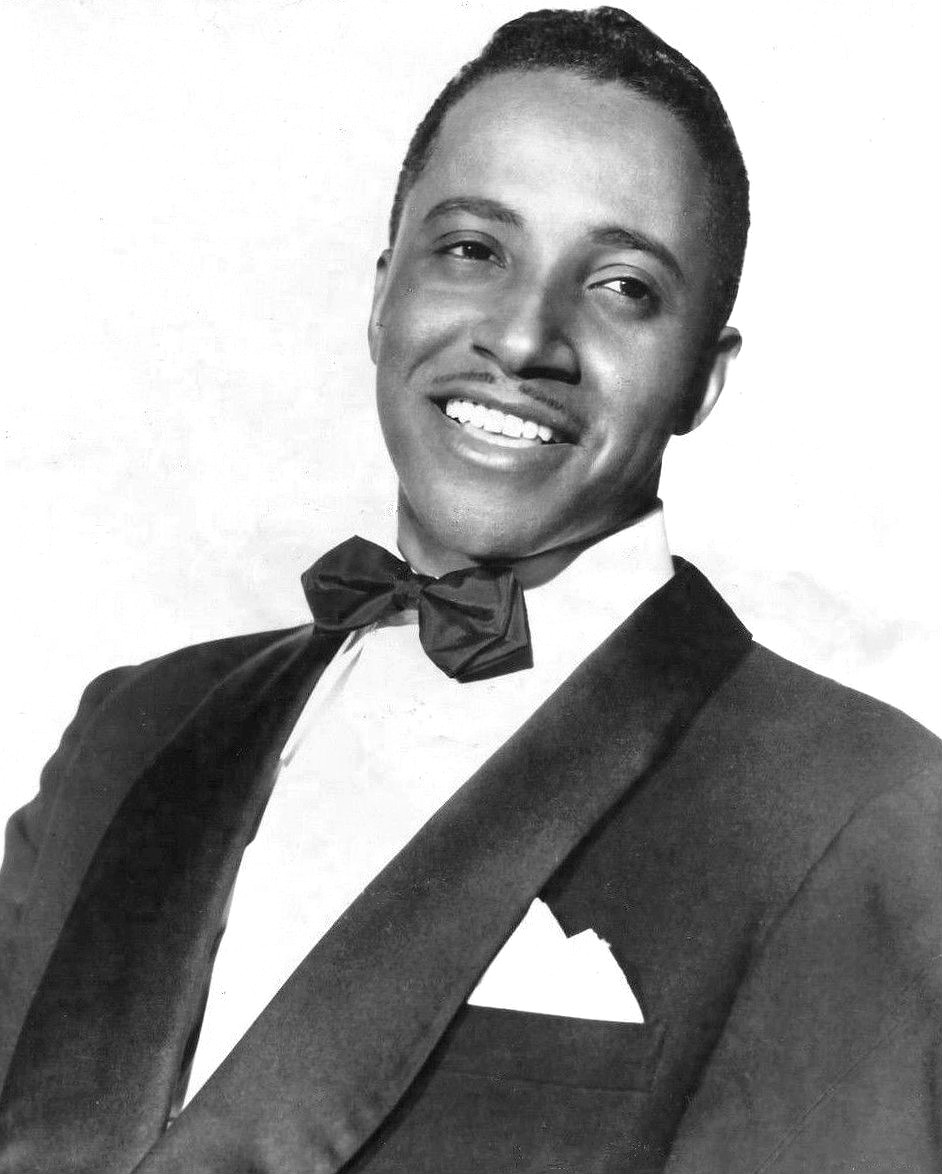
Tommy Edwards had the final number one on the Best Sellers in Stores chart with "It's All in the Game".

Chart history
Issue date	Best Sellers		Jockeys		Ref.
Issue date	Title	Artist(s)	Title	Artist(s)	Ref.
January 6	"At the Hop"	Danny & the Juniors	"Raunchy"	Ernie Freeman	
January 13	"At the Hop"	Danny & the Juniors	"Raunchy"	Ernie Freeman	
January 20	"At the Hop"	Danny & the Juniors	"Raunchy"	Bill Justis	
January 27	"At the Hop"	Danny & the Juniors	"I'll Come Running Back to You"	Sam Cooke	
February 3	"At the Hop"	Danny & the Juniors	"Get A Job"	The Silhouettes	
February 10	"Get A Job"	The Silhouettes	"Get A Job"	The Silhouettes	
February 17	"Get A Job"	The Silhouettes	"Get A Job"	The Silhouettes	
February 24	"Get A Job"	The Silhouettes	"Get A Job"	The Silhouettes	
March 3	"Get A Job"	The Silhouettes	"Get A Job"	The Silhouettes	
March 10	"Sweet Little Sixteen"	Chuck Berry	"Get A Job"	The Silhouettes	
March 17	"Sweet Little Sixteen"	Chuck Berry	"Sweet Little Sixteen"	Chuck Berry	
March 24	"Sweet Little Sixteen"	Chuck Berry	"Sweet Little Sixteen"	Chuck Berry	
March 31	"Tequila"	The Champs	"Sweet Little Sixteen"	Chuck Berry	
April 7	"Tequila"	The Champs	"Tequila"	The Champs	
April 14	"Tequila"	The Champs	"Tequila"	The Champs	
April 21	"Tequila"	The Champs	"Tequila"	The Champs	
April 28	"Twilight Time"	The Platters	"Tequila"	The Champs	
May 5	"Twilight Time"	The Platters	"Wear My Ring Around Your Neck"	Elvis Presley with the Jordanaires	
May 12	"Twilight Time"	The Platters	"Wear My Ring Around Your Neck"	Elvis Presley with the Jordanaires	
May 19	"All I Have to Do Is Dream"	The Everly Brothers	"Wear My Ring Around Your Neck"	Elvis Presley with the Jordanaires	
May 26	"All I Have to Do Is Dream"	The Everly Brothers	"Witch Doctor"	The Music of David Seville	
June 2	"All I Have to Do Is Dream"	The Everly Brothers	"All I Have to Do Is Dream"	The Everly Brothers	
June 9	"All I Have to Do Is Dream"	The Everly Brothers	"All I Have to Do Is Dream"	The Everly Brothers	
June 16	"All I Have to Do Is Dream"	The Everly Brothers	"All I Have to Do Is Dream"	The Everly Brothers	
June 23	"Yakety Yak"	The Coasters	"What Am I Living For"	Chuck Willis	
June 30	"Yakety Yak"	The Coasters	"Yakety Yak"	The Coasters	
July 7	"Yakety Yak"	The Coasters	"Yakety Yak"	The Coasters	
July 14	"Yakety Yak"	The Coasters	"Yakety Yak"	The Coasters	
July 21	"Yakety Yak"	The Coasters	"Yakety Yak"	The Coasters	
July 28	"Yakety Yak"	The Coasters	"Yakety Yak"	The Coasters	
August 4	"Yakety Yak"	The Coasters	"Splish Splash"	Bobby Darin	
August 11	"Patricia"	Pérez Prado and his Orchestra	"Splish Splash"	Bobby Darin	
August 18	"Patricia"	Pérez Prado and his Orchestra	"Yakety Yak"	The Coasters	
August 25	"Just a Dream"	Jimmy Clanton and his Rockets	"Patricia"	Pérez Prado and his Orchestra	
September 1	"Little Star"	The Elegants	"When"	Kalin Twins	
September 8	"Little Star"	The Elegants	"Little Star"	The Elegants	
September 15	"Little Star"	The Elegants	"Little Star"	The Elegants	
September 22	"Little Star"	The Elegants	"Little Star"	The Elegants	
September 29	"It's All in the Game"	Tommy Edwards	"Little Star"	The Elegants	
October 6	"It's All in the Game"	Tommy Edwards	"Rock-in-Robin"	Bobby Day	
October 13	"It's All in the Game"	Tommy Edwards	"Rock-in-Robin"	Bobby Day	

=== Hot R&B Sides ===
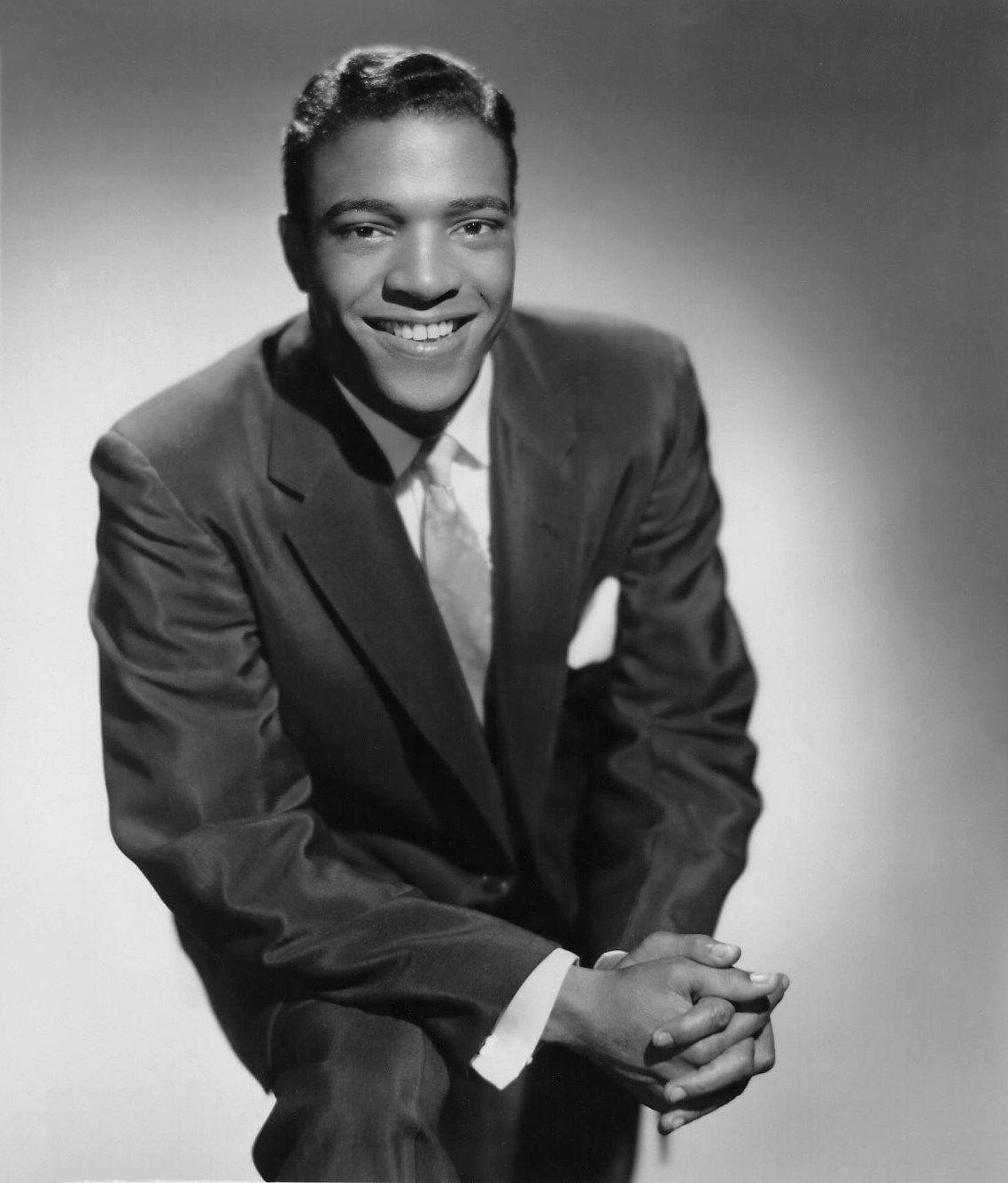
Clyde McPhatter topped the chart in December with "A Lover's Question".

Issue date	Title	Artist(s)	Ref.
October 20	"Rock-in-Robin"	Bobby Day	
October 27	"Topsy II"	Cozy Cole	
November 3	"Topsy II"	Cozy Cole	
November 10	"Topsy II"	Cozy Cole	
November 17	"Topsy II"	Cozy Cole	
November 24	"Topsy II"	Cozy Cole	
December 1	"Topsy II"	Cozy Cole	
December 8	"A Lover's Question"	Clyde McPhatter	
December 15	"Lonely Teardrops"	Jackie Wilson	
December 22	"Lonely Teardrops"	Jackie Wilson	
December 29	"Lonely Teardrops"	Jackie Wilson	
