= List of artists who reached number one in the United States =

This is a list of recording artists who have reached number one on Billboard magazine's weekly singles chart(s). This list spans from the issue dated January 1, 1955 to the present. Prior to the creation of the Billboard Hot 100, Billboard published four weekly singles charts: "Best Sellers in Stores", "Most Played by Jockeys", "Most Played in Jukeboxes" and "The Top 100" (an early version of the Hot 100). The Hot 100 began with the issue dated August 4, 1958, and is currently the standard music popularity chart in the United States.

== List inclusions ==
- All acts are listed alphabetically, solo artists by last name, groups by group name excluding "A", "An", and "The".
- Each act's total of number-one hits is shown after their name.
- All artists who are officially namechecked in song credits are listed here; this includes one-time pairings of otherwise solo artists and those appearing as "featuring". Exceptions to this rule:
1. Paul McCartney's hits with Wings are credited to "Wings" even though many of them were released as "Paul McCartney & Wings". McCartney's total is only from hits not attributed to Wings nor the Beatles. If entries from the Beatles, Wings and McCartney were combined, his total of number one hits would be 29, making him the most successful artist in the history of the chart.
2. Diana Ross, as some number-one hits credited to "Diana Ross and the Supremes", are attributed to the Supremes only. If Ross's solo entries here were combined with those of the Supremes, it would bring her total of number one hits to 18, making her the female artist with the second most total number one hits, after only Mariah Carey with 19.
3. "That's What Friends Are For" charted as "Dionne & Friends". Each vocalist on the recording (Dionne Warwick, Elton John, Gladys Knight and Stevie Wonder) is given individual credit for a number-one song.
- Both Wham! and George Michael get one credit for "Careless Whisper". Technically the song is a solo recording and was released as such in many parts of the world except the U.S., where it charted as "Wham! featuring George Michael".
- Leave The Door Open by the duo, Silk Sonic, is credited 1 each to the individual artists, Bruno Mars and Anderson .Paak.
- "We Are the World" is credited to "USA for Africa", and not the individual artists who participated in the recording.
- Double A-sides are counted as one number-one single.
- Artists associated with a group who reached number one, yet have their own solo page in Wikipedia, are not listed here unless they hit number one as a solo artist.
- Artists who hit number one prior to the start of the Hot 100 are included here.
- A song that topped multiple pre-Hot 100 charts is counted only once towards the artist's total.
- The ° symbol indicates that all or part of an artist's total includes number-ones occurring on any of the pre-Hot 100 chart(s) listed above (January 1, 1955 through July 28, 1958).

== 0–9 ==
- 112 (1)
- 21 Savage (2)
- 24kGoldn (1)
- 50 Cent (4)
- 6ix9ine (1)
- 98 Degrees (1)

== A ==
- Aaliyah (1)
- ABBA (1)
- Gregory Abbott (1)
- Paula Abdul (6)
- Ace of Base (1)
- Bryan Adams (4)
- Adassa (1)
- Adele (5)
- Aerosmith (1)
- Afrojack (1)
- Christina Aguilera (5)
- A-ha (1)
- Clay Aiken (1)
- Air Supply (1)
- Akon (2)
- Jason Aldean (1)
- Ali (1)
- All-4-One (1)
- Herb Alpert (2)
- America (2)
- Rei Ami (1)
- The Angels (1)
- The Animals (1)
- Paul Anka (3)
- Oliver Anthony Music (1)
- The Archies (1)
- Louis Armstrong (1)
- Ashanti (2)
- The Association (2)
- Rick Astley (2)
- Atlantic Starr (1)
- Patti Austin (1)
- Frankie Avalon (2)
- Average White Band (1)
- Iggy Azalea (1)

== B ==
- Baauer (1)
- Bachman–Turner Overdrive (1)
- Bad Bunny (2)
- Bad English (1)
- J Balvin (1)
- Bananarama (1)
- The Bangles (2)
- Barenaked Ladies (1)
- Toni Basil (1)
- Les Baxter (2)°
- Bay City Rollers (1)
- The Beach Boys (4)
- The Beatles (20)
- Stephanie Beatriz (1)
- Bee Gees (9)
- Archie Bell & the Drells (1)
- The Bellamy Brothers (1)
- Regina Belle (1)
- Lauren Bennett (1)
- Berlin (1)
- Chuck Berry (1)
- Beyoncé (9)
- Justin Bieber (8)
- Mr. Acker Bilk (1)
- The Black Eyed Peas (3)
- Blackstreet (1)
- Mary J. Blige (1)
- Blondie (4)
- Blue Swede (1)
- James Blunt (1)
- B.o.B. (1)
- Michael Bolton (2)
- Bon Jovi (4)
- Jon Bon Jovi (1)
- Gary U.S. Bonds (1)
- Krayzie Bone (1)
- Bone Thugs-n-Harmony (1)
- Metro Boomin (1)
- Debby Boone (1)
- Pat Boone (6)°
- Boston (1)
- David Bowie (2)
- The Box Tops (1)
- Boyz II Men (5)
- Brandy (2)
- Toni Braxton (2)
- Bread (1)
- Bobby Brown (2)
- Chris Brown (2)
- Sleepy Brown (1)
- The Browns (1)
- Zach Bryan (1)
- Peabo Bryson (1)
- B2K (1)
- BTS (7)
- The Buckinghams (1)
- The Byrds (2)

== C ==
- C+C Music Factory (1)
- Camila Cabello (2)
- Daniel Caesar (1)
- Glen Campbell (2)
- Lewis Capaldi (1)
- Captain & Tennille (2)
- Irene Cara (1)
- Cardi B (5)
- Mariah Carey (19)
- Belinda Carlisle (1)
- Kim Carnes (1)
- Sabrina Carpenter (2)
- The Carpenters (3)
- Playboi Carti (1)
- Shaun Cassidy (1)
- Mauro Castillo (1)
- The Cataracs (1)
- Peter Cetera (2)
- The Chainsmokers (1)
- Chamillionaire (1)
- The Champs (1)°
- Chance the Rapper (1)
- Gene Chandler (1)
- Bruce Channel (1)
- Harry Chapin (1)
- Ray Charles (3)
- Cheap Trick (1)
- Chubby Checker (2)
- Cher (4)
- Chic (2)
- Chicago (3)
- The Chiffons (1)
- The Chi-Lites (1)
- The Chipmunks (see David Seville and the Chipmunks)
- The Chordettes (1)°
- Lou Christie (1)
- Ciara (1)
- Eric Clapton (1)
- The Dave Clark Five (1)
- Petula Clark (2)
- Kelly Clarkson (3)
- Club Nouveau (1)
- The Coasters (1)°
- Odia Coates (1)
- Joe Cocker (1)
- Coldplay (2)
- J. Cole (1)
- Phil Collins (7)
- Color Me Badd (2)
- Commodores (2)
- Perry Como (3)°
- Bill Conti (1)
- Sam Cooke (1)°
- Coolio (1)
- Bradley Cooper (1)
- Dave "Baby" Cortez (1)
- Crazy Town (1)
- Creed (1)
- The Crickets (1)°
- Jim Croce (2)
- Christopher Cross (2)
- Taio Cruz (1)
- The Crystals (1)
- Kid Cudi (1)
- Cult Jam (see Lisa Lisa & Cult Jam)
- Culture Club (1)
- Cutting Crew (1)
- Billy Ray Cyrus (1)
- Miley Cyrus (2)

== D ==
- D4L (1)
- DaBaby (1)
- Daft Punk (1)
- Dale & Grace (1)
- Ray Dalton (1)
- Michael Damian (1)
- Danny & the Juniors (1)°
- Terence Trent D'Arby (1)
- Bobby Darin (1)
- Billy Davis Jr. (1)
- Mac Davis (1)
- Sammy Davis Jr. (1)
- Dawn (see Tony Orlando and Dawn)
- Taylor Dayne (1)
- Jimmy Dean (1)
- Joey Dee and the Starliters (1)
- Kiki Dee (1)
- Rick Dees (1)
- Def Leppard (1)
- John Denver (4)
- Jason Derulo (2)
- Desiigner (1)
- Destiny's Child (4)
- Dev (1)
- Dexys Midnight Runners (1)
- Neil Diamond (3)
- Mark Dinning (1)
- Dion (1)
- Céline Dion (4)
- Iann Dior (1)
- Dire Straits (1)
- Divine (1)
- The Dixie Cups (1)
- DJ Khaled (1)
- Dr. Dre (3)
- Ernie K-Doe (1)
- Doja Cat (2)
- Bo Donaldson & the Heywoods (1)
- Donovan (1)
- The Doobie Brothers (2)
- The Doors (2)
- Carl Douglas (1)
- Joe Dowell (1)
- Drake (14)
- The Drifters (1)
- Dru Hill (1)
- Ricardo "RikRok" Ducent (1)
- Duran Duran (2)

== E ==
- Eagles (5)
- Earth, Wind & Fire (1)
- Sheena Easton (1)
- Tommy Edwards (1)
- Billie Eilish (1)
- Ejae (1)
- The Elegants (1)
- Yvonne Elliman (1)
- EMF (1)
- Eminem (5)
- The Emotions (1)
- Cast of Encanto (1)
- The Escape Club (1)
- The Essex (1)
- Gloria Estefan (2) and Miami Sound Machine (1)
- Eurythmics (1)
- Faith Evans (1)
- The Everly Brothers (4)°
- Exile (1)
- Exposé (1)
- Extreme (1)

== F ==
- Shelley Fabares (1)
- Percy Faith (1)
- Falco (1)
- Fantasia (1)
- Far East Movement (1)
- Rhenzy Feliz (1)
- Freddy Fender (1)
- Fergie (3)
- The Fifth Dimension (2)
- Fine Young Cannibals (2)
- Roberta Flack (3)
- Fleetwood Mac (1)
- The Fleetwoods (2)
- Flo Rida (3)
- Luis Fonsi (1)
- Wayne Fontana and the Mindbenders (1)
- Fontane Sisters (1)°
- Tennessee Ernie Ford (1)°
- Foreigner (1)
- Four Aces (1)°
- The Four Seasons (5)
- Four Tops (2)
- Jamie Foxx (2)
- Connie Francis (3)
- Aretha Franklin (2)
- John Fred and His Playboy Band (1)
- Freddie and the Dreamers (1)
- Fun (1)
- Nelly Furtado (3)
- Future (3)

== G ==
- Peter Gabriel (1)
- Carolina Gaitán (1)
- Childish Gambino (1)
- Art Garfunkel (see Simon and Garfunkel)
- Siedah Garrett (1)
- Marvin Gaye (3)
- Gloria Gaynor (1)
- The J. Geils Band (1)
- Genesis (1)
- Bobbie Gentry (1)
- Andy Gibb (3)
- Georgia Gibbs (1)°
- Debbie Gibson (2)
- Nick Gilder (1)
- Jimmy Gilmer & the Fireballs (1)
- Gipp (1)
- Giveon (1)
- Glass Animals (1)
- Bobby Goldsboro (1)
- Selena Gomez (1)
- GoonRock (1)
- Lesley Gore (1)
- Gotye (1)
- Charlie Gracie (1)°
- Grand Funk Railroad (2)
- Ariana Grande (10)
- Amy Grant (2)
- Gogi Grant (1)°
- Al Green (1)
- Lorne Greene (1)
- Gucci Mane (1)
- Diane Guerrero (1)
- The Guess Who (1)
- Guns N' Roses (1)

== H ==
- Bill Haley and His Comets (1)°
- Daryl Hall and John Oates (6)
- Halsey (2)
- Hamilton, Joe Frank & Reynolds (1)
- Jan Hammer (1)
- Hanson (1)
- Jack Harlow (3)
- Calvin Harris (1)
- George Harrison (3)
- Wilbert Harrison (1)
- Bill Hayes (1)°
- Isaac Hayes (1)
- Heart (2)
- The Heights (1)
- Herman's Hermits (2)
- Taylor Hicks (1)
- Hi-Five (1)
- The Highwaymen (1)
- Lauryn Hill (1)
- Loleatta Holloway (1)
- Hollywood Argyles (1)
- Rupert Holmes (1)
- Honey Cone (1)
- Bruce Hornsby and the Range (1)
- Johnny Horton (1)
- Thelma Houston (1)
- Whitney Houston (11)
- Hozier (1)
- The Hues Corporation (1)
- The Human League (2)
- Tab Hunter (1)° (Note: Tab Hunter reached No. 1 on two of the (then) four pre-Hot 100 charts on February 16, 1957, and on the remaining two charts on March 2, 1957, with one of four co-existing covers (common in those days) of Ric Cartey and the Jiva-Tones's "Young Love". While Cartey's original never reached No. 1, the cover by Sonny James narrowly beat Hunter's version to No. 1, though on just one of the four pre-Hot 100 charts, on February 9, 1957. See: List of Billboard number-one singles of 1957)
- Huntrix (1)
- Brian Hyland (1)

== I ==
- Billy Idol (1)
- Enrique Iglesias (2)
- James Ingram (2)
- INXS (1)

== J ==
- Ja Rule (3)
- Terry Jacks (1)
- Janet Jackson (10)
- Michael Jackson (13)
- The Jackson 5 (4)
- Sonny James (1)° (Note: Sonny James reached No. 1 on one of the (then) four pre-Hot 100 charts on February 9, 1957, with one of four co-existing covers (common in those days) of Ric Cartey and the Jiva-Tones's "Young Love". While Cartey's original never reached No. 1, the James version narrowly beat Tab Hunter's version to No. 1, with Hunter peaking on all four of the pre-Hot 100 charts between February 16 and March 2, 1957. The version by James also hit No. 1 on all three of the pre-Hot Country Songs charts, starting on February 9, 1957, matching Hunter for total charts of any "flavor" with the song. See: List of Billboard number-one singles of 1957 and List of Billboard number-one country songs of 1957)
- Tommy James and the Shondells (2)
- Jan & Dean (1)
- Jawsh 685 (1)
- Jay-Z (4)
- Wyclef Jean (1)
- Carly Rae Jepsen (1)
- Joan Jett and the Blackhearts (1)
- Jimin (1)
- Joe (2)
- Billy Joel (3)
- Elton John (9)
- Robert John (1)
- Jonas Brothers (1)
- Janis Joplin (1)
- Montell Jordan (1)
- Juicy J (1)
- Jung Kook (1)
- Juvenile (1)

== K ==
- Bert Kaempfert (1)
- Ini Kamoze (1)
- KC and the Sunshine Band (5)
- K-Ci & JoJo (2)
- R. Kelly (2)
- Eddie Kendricks (1)
- Kesha (3)
- Alicia Keys (4)
- Wiz Khalifa (2)
- The Kid Laroi (1)
- Rich the Kid (1)
- Andy Kim (1)
- Kimbra (1)
- Carole King (1)
- Sean Kingston (1)
- Kingston Trio (1)
- The Knack (1)
- Gladys Knight (2)
  (1-Gladys Knight & the Pips, 1-Dionne & Friends)
- Buddy Knox (1)°
- Kool and the Gang (1)
- Kool Moe Dee (1)
- Kris Kross (1)
- Kyla (1)

== L ==
- Labelle (1)
- Patti LaBelle (1)
- Steve Lacy (1)
- Lady Gaga (6)
- Kendrick Lamar (6)
- Ella Langley (1)
- Latto (1)
- Cyndi Lauper (2)
- Avril Lavigne (1)
- Steve Lawrence (1)
- Vicki Lawrence (1)
- Brenda Lee (3)
- Murphy Lee (1)
- John Legend (1)
- The Lemon Pipers (1)
- John Lennon (2)
- Bobby Lewis (1)
- Gary Lewis & the Playboys (1)
- Huey Lewis and the News (3)
- Leona Lewis (1)
- Ryan Lewis (see Macklemore & Ryan Lewis)
- Gordon Lightfoot (1)
- Lil Jon (1)
- Lil' Kim (1)
- Lil Nas X (3)
- Lil Uzi Vert (1)
- Lil Wayne (3)
- Lipps, Inc. (1)
- Lisa Lisa and Cult Jam (2)
- Little Eva (1)
- LL Cool J (1)
- LMFAO (2)
- Lisa Loeb and Nine Stories (1)
- Lizzo (2)
- Kenny Loggins (1)
- Laurie London (1)°
- Londonbeat (1)
- Lonestar (1)
- Looking Glass (1)
- Jennifer Lopez (4)
- Lorde (1)
- Los del Río (1)
- Los Lobos (1)
- The Love Unlimited Orchestra (1)
- The Lovin' Spoonful (1)
- Jim Lowe (1)°
- Ludacris (5)
- Lulu (1)
- L.V. (1)

== M ==
- M (1)
- Mary MacGregor (1)
- Macklemore & Ryan Lewis (2)
- Madonna (12)
- Magic! (1)
- Post Malone (6)
- The Mamas & the Papas (1)
- Henry Mancini (1)
- Manfred Mann (1)
- Manfred Mann's Earth Band (1)
- The Manhattans (1)
- Barry Manilow (3)
- The Marcels (1)
- Little Peggy March (1)
- Mario (1)
- Marky Mark and the Funky Bunch (1)
- Maroon 5 (4)
- Bruno Mars (10)
- Martika (1)
- Dean Martin (2)°
- Marilyn Martin (1)
- Ricky Martin (1)
- The Marvelettes (1)
- Richard Marx (3)
- Mase (2)
- Hugh Masekela (1)
- Matchbox Twenty (1)
- Johnny Mathis (2)°
- Paul Mauriat (1)
- C.W. McCall (1)
- Linda McCartney (1)
- Paul McCartney (3)
- Marilyn McCoo (1)
- Van McCoy and the Soul City Symphony (1)
- The McCoys (1)
- George McCrae (1)
- Michael McDonald (1)
- Bobby McFerrin (1)
- Maureen McGovern (1)
- Barry McGuire (1)
- McGuire Sisters (2)°
- Don McLean (1)
- Tate McRae (1)
- Meat Loaf (1)
- Meco (1)
- Glenn Medeiros (1)
- Bill Medley (1)
- Melanie (1)
- John Mellencamp (1)
- Men at Work (2)
- Shawn Mendes (1)
- MFSB (1)
- Miami Sound Machine (see Gloria Estefan)
- George Michael (8)
- Bette Midler (1)
- M.I.A (1)
- Migos (1)
- Mike and the Mechanics (1)
- Mitch Miller (1)°
- Steve Miller Band (3)
- Milli Vanilli (3)
- Mims (1)
- Nicki Minaj (3)
- The Miracles (2)
- Mr. Big (1)
- Mr. Mister (2)
- Guy Mitchell (2)°
- Domenico Modugno (1)
- Janelle Monáe (1)
- Monica (3)
- The Monkees (3)
- Walter Murphy and the Big Apple Band (1)
- Anne Murray (1)
- Kacey Musgraves (1)
- Mýa (1)
- Alannah Myles (1)
- Mystikal (1)

== N ==
- Johnny Nash (1)
- Nate Dogg (1)
- Nayer (1)
- Nelly (4)
- Nelson (1)
- Ricky Nelson (2)
- New Kids on the Block (3)
- The New Power Generation (see Prince)
- The New Vaudeville Band (1)
- Olivia Newton-John (5)
- Next (1)
- Ne-Yo (2)
- Nickelback (1)
- Harry Nilsson (1)
- The Notorious B.I.G. (2)
- NSYNC (1)
- Audrey Nuna (1)

== O ==
- John Oates (see Daryl Hall and John Oates)
- Billy Ocean (3)
- Sinéad O'Connor (1)
- Alan O'Day (1)
- Colby O'Donis (1)
- Ohio Players (2)
- The O'Jays (1)
- Olivia (1)
- OMI (1)
- Roy Orbison (2)
- Tony Orlando and Dawn (3)
- Donny Osmond (1)
- The Osmonds (1)
- Gilbert O'Sullivan (1)
- Outkast (3)
- Owl City (1)

== P ==
- Anderson .Paak (1)
- Petey Pablo (1)
- Tommy Page (1)
- Robert Palmer (1)
- Paper Lace (1)
- Ray Parker Jr. (1)
- John Parr (1)
- Dolly Parton (2)
- The Partridge Family (1)
- Billy Paul (1)
- Sean Paul (4)
- Paul & Paula (1)
- Peaches & Herb (1)
- Katy Perry (9)
- Pet Shop Boys (1)
- Peter & Gordon (1)
- Peter, Paul and Mary (1)
- Kim Petras (1)
- Pharrell (4)
- Bobby "Boris" Pickett and the Crypt-Kickers (1)
- Pink (4)
- Pink Floyd (1)
- Pitbull (2)
- Plain White T's (1)
- The Platters (4)°
- Player (1)
- PM Dawn (1)
- Poison (1)
- The Police (1)
- Polo G (1)
- Daniel Powter (1)
- Pérez Prado (2)°
- Elvis Presley (17)°
- Billy Preston (2)
- Johnny Preston (1)
- Lloyd Price (1)
- Maxi Priest (1)
- Prince (5) and the Revolution (3) / and the New Power Generation (1)
- The Product G&B (1)
- Puff Daddy/P. Diddy/Diddy (5)
- Charlie Puth (1)

== Q ==
- Quavo (1)
- Queen (2)
- Question Mark & the Mysterians (1)

== R ==
- Eddie Rabbitt (1)
- Rae Sremmurd (1)
- The Raiders (1)
- The Rascals/The Young Rascals (3)
- Rayvon (1)
- Ready for the World (1)
- Otis Redding (1)
- Helen Reddy (3)
- REO Speedwagon (2)
- The Revolution (see Prince)
- Debbie Reynolds (1)°
- Rhythm Heritage (1)
- Roddy Ricch (2)
- Charlie Rich (1)
- Lionel Richie (5)
- Nelson Riddle (1)°
- Right Said Fred (1)
- The Righteous Brothers (2)
- Rihanna (14)
- Jeannie C. Riley (1)
- Minnie Riperton (1)
- Johnny Rivers (1)
- Marty Robbins (1)
- Jimmie Rodgers (1)°
- Olivia Rodrigo (4)
- Tommy Roe (2)
- Kenny Rogers (2)
- The Rolling Stones (8)
- Mark Ronson (1)
- Linda Ronstadt (1)
- The Rooftop Singers (1)
- David Rose (1)
- Rose Royce (1)
- Diana Ross (6)
- Kelly Rowland (1)
- Roxette (4)
- Ruby & the Romantics (1)
- Nate Ruess (1)

== S ==
- SSgt Barry Sadler (1)
- Kyu Sakamoto (1)
- Santana (2)
- Santo & Johnny (1)
- Savage Garden (2)
- Leo Sayer (2)
- Travis Scott (5)
- Seal (1)
- Jay Sean (1)
- John Sebastian (1)
- Neil Sedaka (3)
- Bob Seger (1)
- Michael Sembello (1)
- David Seville (2)° and the Chipmunks (1)
- Shaboozey (1)
- Shaggy (2)
- Shakira (1)
- Tupac Shakur/2Pac (1)
- The Shangri-Las (1)
- Del Shannon (1)
- Shawnna (1)
- Ed Sheeran (2)
- Sheriff (1)
- The Shirelles (2)
- Shocking Blue (1)
- Sia (1)
- Silhouettes (1)°
- Silk (1)
- Silk Sonic (1)
- Silver Convention (1)
- Carly Simon (1)
- Paul Simon (1)
- Simon and Garfunkel (3)
- Simple Minds (1)
- Simply Red (2)
- Frank Sinatra (3)°
- Nancy Sinatra (2)
- The Singing Nun (1)
- Sir Mix-a-Lot (1)
- Sisqó (1)
- Percy Sledge (1)
- Slim Thug (1)
- Sly and the Family Stone (3)
- Sam Smith (1)
- Will Smith (2)
- Snoop Dogg (3)
- Snow (1)
- Sonny and Cher (1)
- David Soul (1)
- Jimmy Soul (1)
- Soulja Boy Tell 'Em (1)
- Soulja Slim (1)
- Britney Spears (5)
- Spice Girls (1)
- The Spinners (1)
- Rick Springfield (1)
- Megan Thee Stallion (3)
- The Staple Singers (2)
- Starland Vocal Band (1)
- Edwin Starr (1)
- Kay Starr (1)°
- Ringo Starr (2)
- Stars on 45 (1)
- Starship (3)
- Static Major (1)
- Steam (1)
- Gwen Stefani (1)
- April Stevens (1)
- Ray Stevens (2)
- Stevie B (1)
- Amii Stewart (1)
- Rod Stewart (4)
- Sting (1)
- Morris Stoloff (1)°
- Stories (1)
- Strawberry Alarm Clock (1)
- Barbra Streisand (5)
- Harry Styles (3)
- Styx (1)
- Donna Summer (4)
- The Supremes (12)
- Surface (1)
- Survivor (1)
- Billy Swan (1)
- Swae Lee (1)
- Sweet Sensation (1)
- Taylor Swift (16)
- Teddy Swims (1)
- SWV (1)
- The Sylvers (1)
- SZA (3)

== T ==
- A Taste of Honey (1)
- James Taylor (1)
- Johnnie Taylor (1)
- Tears for Fears (2)
- The Teddy Bears (1)
- Nino Tempo (1)
- The Temptations (4)
- Tems (1)
- Terror Squad (1)
- Robin Thicke (1)
- B. J. Thomas (2)
- Rob Thomas (1)
- The Three Degrees (1)
- Three Dog Night (3)
- T.I. (4)
- Tiffany (2)
- Timbaland (2)
- Justin Timberlake (5)
- Timmy T (1)
- TLC (4)
- The Tokens (1)
- The Tornados (1)
- Toto (1)
- T-Pain (3)
- Meghan Trainor (1)
- John Travolta (1)
- The Troggs (1)
- Roger Troutman (1)
- Tina Turner (1)
- The Turtles (1)
- Twista (1)
- Conway Twitty (1)
- Bonnie Tyler (1)
- The Tymes (1)
- Ty Dolla Sign (2)

== U–V ==
- UB40 (2)
- Carrie Underwood (1)
- USA for Africa (1)
- Usher (9)
- U2 (2)
- Frankie Valli (2)
- Van Halen (1)
- Vangelis (1)
- Vanilla Ice (1)
- Bobby Vee (1)
- Billy Vera and the Beaters (1)
- Larry Verne (1)
- Vertical Horizon (1)
- Bobby Vinton (4)

== W ==
- John Waite (1)
- Paul Wall (1)
- Morgan Wallen (4)
- Wanz (1)
- Anita Ward (1)
- Jennifer Warnes (2)
- Alex Warren (1)
- Dionne Warwick (2)
- Martha Wash (1)
- Joan Weber (1)°
- The Weeknd (7)
- Lawrence Welk (1)
- Mary Wells (1)
- Kanye West (5)
- Wham! (3)
- Barry White (1)
- Karyn White (1)
- Whitesnake (1)
- Wild Cherry (1)
- The Wild Pair (1)
- Kim Wilde (1)
- will.i.am (1)
- Will to Power (1)
- Andy Williams (1)° (Note: Andy Williams reached No. 1 on two of the (then) four pre-Hot 100 charts on March 30, 1957, with a co-existing cover (common in those days) of Charlie Gracie's "Butterfly". Gracie's original also reached No. 1, on one of the four pre-Hot 100 charts, on April 13, 1957. See: List of Billboard number-one singles of 1957)
- Deniece Williams (2)
- Freedom Williams (1)
- Maurice Williams and the Zodiacs (1)
- Roger Williams (1)° (Note: Roger Williams reached No. 1 on one of the (then) four pre-Hot 100 charts on October 29, 1955, with a cover of the 1945 song "Autumn Leaves". See: List of Billboard number-one singles of 1955)
- Vanessa Williams (1)
- Al Wilson (1)
- Wilson Phillips (3)
- Wings (6)
- The Edgar Winter Group (1)
- Steve Winwood (2)
- Bill Withers (1)
- Wizkid (1)
- Stevie Wonder (10)
- Sheb Wooley (1)° (Note: Sheb Wooley reached No. 1 on two of the (then) three pre-Hot 100 charts on June 9, 1958, and on the remaining chart on June 23, 1958, with "The Purple People Eater". See: List of Billboard number-one singles of 1958)

== X–Z ==
- Charli XCX (1)
- XXXTentacion (1)
- Daddy Yankee (1)
- Yes (1)
- Young Jeezy (1)
- Young Thug (3)
- Neil Young (1)
- Paul Young (1)
- ¥$ (1)
- Yung Joc (1)
- Zager and Evans (1)
- Zayn (1)

== See also ==
- List of number-one hits (United States)
- List of best-selling music artists
- List of artists who reached number one on the UK Singles Chart
