= List of Billboard number-one singles of 1958 =

The Billboard Hot 100 is a chart that ranks the best-performing songs in the United States. The chart was first issued in the magazine issue of August 4, 1958. Prior to that, Billboard published four popular song charts; the Top 100, the first Billboard chart to feature a combined tabulation of sales, airplay and jukebox play; Best Sellers in Stores, ranking the best-selling singles in retail stores; Most Played by Jockeys, ranking the most played songs on US radio stations; and the leading song chart, Honor Roll of Hits, which ranked the most popular songs (not singles) in the country. With the foundation of the Hot 100, Top 100 and Most Played by Jockeys were discontinued. Best Sellers in Stores continued until October 13, 1958, while Honor Roll of Hits continued until 1963. In 1958, twenty-five different songs were able to top one of the four charts. A majority of the songs which topped the Best Sellers in Stores, which Billboard considered the predecessor of the Hot 100, were able to also top the two other singles-tracking charts. The first song to top all three charts was Danny & the Juniors' "At the Hop".

On the Hot 100, eight acts hit the top, which were also their first. Those acts include Ricky Nelson, Domenico Modugno, The Elegants, Tommy Edwards, Conway Twitty, The Kingston Trio, The Teddy Bears, and The Chipmunks (even though David Seville went to number one earlier this year with “Witch Doctor“, which hit prior to the creation of the Hot 100).

== Pre-Hot 100 ==
NOTE: The Hot 100 Era officially began on Monday, August 4, 1958, which would be the week ending August 10 (issue date August 4). The Best Sellers in Stores list issued through October 13.

Issue date	Best Sellers in Stores	Most Played by Jockeys	Honor Roll of Hits	Top 100	Ref.
January 6	"At the Hop"; Danny & the Juniors with Artie Singer	"April Love"; Pat Boone with Billy Vaughn	"April Love"; Pat Boone	"At the Hop"; Danny & the Juniors with Artie Singer	
January 13	"At the Hop"; Danny & the Juniors with Artie Singer	"April Love"; Pat Boone with Billy Vaughn	"April Love"; Pat Boone	"At the Hop"; Danny & the Juniors with Artie Singer	
January 20	"At the Hop"; Danny & the Juniors with Artie Singer	"April Love"; Pat Boone with Billy Vaughn	"April Love"; Pat Boone	"At the Hop"; Danny & the Juniors with Artie Singer	
January 27	"At the Hop"; Danny & the Juniors with Artie Singer	"At the Hop"; Danny & the Juniors	"At the Hop"; Danny & the Juniors	"At the Hop"; Danny & the Juniors with Artie Singer	
February 3	"At the Hop"; Danny & the Juniors with Artie Singer	"At the Hop"; Danny & the Juniors	"At the Hop"; Danny & the Juniors	"At the Hop"; Danny & the Juniors with Artie Singer	
February 10	"Don't"/I Beg of You"; Elvis Presley with The Jordanaires	"At the Hop"; Danny & the Juniors	"At the Hop"; Danny & the Juniors	"At the Hop"; Danny & the Juniors with Artie Singer	
February 17	"Don't"/I Beg of You"; Elvis Presley with The Jordanaires	"Sugartime"; The McGuire Sisters with Neal Hefti	"At the Hop"; Danny & the Juniors	"At the Hop"; Danny & the Juniors with Artie Singer	
February 24	"Don't"/I Beg of You"; Elvis Presley with The Jordanaires	"Sugartime"; The McGuire Sisters with Neal Hefti	""Sugartime"; The McGuire Sisters	"Get a Job"; The Silhouettes	
March 3	"Don't"/I Beg of You"; Elvis Presley with The Jordanaires	"Sugartime"; The McGuire Sisters with Neal Hefti	""Sugartime"; The McGuire Sisters	"Get a Job"; The Silhouettes	
March 10	"Don't"/I Beg of You"; Elvis Presley with The Jordanaires	"Sugartime"; The McGuire Sisters with Neal Hefti	""Sugartime"; The McGuire Sisters	"Don't"; Elvis Presley with The Jordanaires	
March 17	"Tequila"; The Champs	"Don't"; Elvis Presley with The Jordanaires	"Catch a Falling Star"; Perry Como	"Tequila"; The Champs	
March 24	"Tequila"; The Champs	"Catch a Falling Star"; Perry Como with Mitchell Ayres and The Ray Charles Singers	"Tequila"; The Champs	"Tequila"; The Champs	
March 31	"Tequila"; The Champs	"Tequila"; The Champs	"Tequila"; The Champs	"Tequila"; The Champs	
April 7	"Tequila"; The Champs	"Tequila"; The Champs	"Tequila"; The Champs	"Tequila"; The Champs	
April 14	"Tequila"; The Champs	"He's Got the Whole World in His Hands"; Laurie London with Geoff Love	"Tequila"; The Champs	"Tequila"; The Champs	
April 21	"Twilight Time"; The Platters	"He's Got the Whole World in His Hands"; Laurie London with Geoff Love	"He's Got the Whole World in His Hands"; Laurie London	"Twilight Time"; The Platters	
April 28	"Witch Doctor"; David Seville	"He's Got the Whole World in His Hands"; Laurie London with Geoff Love	"He's Got the Whole World in His Hands"; Laurie London	"Witch Doctor"; David Seville	
May 5	"Witch Doctor"; David Seville	"He's Got the Whole World in His Hands"; Laurie London with Geoff Love	"Witch Doctor"; David Seville	"Witch Doctor"; David Seville	
May 12	"All I Have to Do Is Dream"/"Claudette"; The Everly Brothers	"Twilight Time"; The Platters	"Witch Doctor"; David Seville	"Witch Doctor"; David Seville	
May 19	"All I Have to Do Is Dream"/"Claudette"; The Everly Brothers	"All I Have To Do Is Dream"; The Everly Brothers	"All I Have To Do Is Dream"; The Everly Brothers	"All I Have To Do Is Dream"; The Everly Brothers	
May 26	"All I Have to Do Is Dream"/"Claudette"; The Everly Brothers	"All I Have To Do Is Dream"; The Everly Brothers	"All I Have To Do Is Dream"; The Everly Brothers	"All I Have To Do Is Dream"; The Everly Brothers	
June 2	"All I Have to Do Is Dream"/"Claudette"; The Everly Brothers	"All I Have To Do Is Dream"; The Everly Brothers	"All I Have To Do Is Dream"; The Everly Brothers	"All I Have To Do Is Dream"; The Everly Brothers	
June 9	"The Purple People Eater"; Sheb Wooley	"All I Have To Do Is Dream"; The Everly Brothers	"All I Have To Do Is Dream"; The Everly Brothers	"The Purple People Eater"; Sheb Wooley	
June 16	"The Purple People Eater"; Sheb Wooley	"All I Have To Do Is Dream"; The Everly Brothers	"The Purple People Eater"^{Sheb Wooley}	"The Purple People Eater"; Sheb Wooley	
June 23	"The Purple People Eater"; Sheb Wooley	"The Purple People Eater"^{Sheb Wooley}	"The Purple People Eater"^{Sheb Wooley}	"The Purple People Eater"; Sheb Wooley	
June 30	"The Purple People Eater"; Sheb Wooley	"The Purple People Eater"^{Sheb Wooley}	"The Purple People Eater"^{Sheb Wooley}	"The Purple People Eater"; Sheb Wooley	
July 7	"The Purple People Eater"; Sheb Wooley	"The Purple People Eater"^{Sheb Wooley}	"The Purple People Eater"^{Sheb Wooley}	"The Purple People Eater"; Sheb Wooley	
July 14	"The Purple People Eater"; Sheb Wooley	"The Purple People Eater"^{Sheb Wooley}	"The Purple People Eater"^{Sheb Wooley}	"The Purple People Eater"; Sheb Wooley	
July 21	"Hard Headed Woman"/"Don't Ask Me Why"; Elvis Presley with The Jordanaires	"Hard Headed Woman"; Elvis Presley with The Jordanaires	"Hard Headed Woman"; Elvis Presley	"Yakety Yak"; The Coasters	
July 28	"Hard Headed Woman"/"Don't Ask Me Why"; Elvis Presley with The Jordanaires	"Patricia"; Pérez Prado and His Orchestra	"Patricia"; Pérez Prado and His Orchestra	"Patricia"; Pérez Prado and His Orchestra	
August 4	"Poor Little Fool"; Ricky Nelson	Chart discontinued	"Patricia"; Pérez Prado and His Orchestra	Chart discontinued	
August 11	"Poor Little Fool"; Ricky Nelson	Chart discontinued	"Patricia"; Pérez Prado and His Orchestra	Chart discontinued	
August 18	"Volare (Nel blu dipinto di blu)" Domenico Modugno	Chart discontinued	"Volare (Nel blu dipinto di blu)" Domenico Modugno	Chart discontinued	
August 25	"Bird Dog"; The Everly Brothers	Chart discontinued	"Volare (Nel blu dipinto di blu)" Domenico Modugno	Chart discontinued	
September 1	"Volare (Nel blu dipinto di blu)" Domenico Modugno	Chart discontinued	"Volare (Nel blu dipinto di blu)" Domenico Modugno	Chart discontinued	
September 8	"Volare (Nel blu dipinto di blu)" Domenico Modugno	Chart discontinued	"Volare (Nel blu dipinto di blu)" Domenico Modugno	Chart discontinued	
September 15	"Volare (Nel blu dipinto di blu)" Domenico Modugno	Chart discontinued	"Volare (Nel blu dipinto di blu)" Domenico Modugno	Chart discontinued	
September 22	"Volare (Nel blu dipinto di blu)" Domenico Modugno	Chart discontinued	"Volare (Nel blu dipinto di blu)" Domenico Modugno	Chart discontinued	
September 29	"It's All in the Game"; Tommy Edwards	Chart discontinued	"Volare (Nel blu dipinto di blu)" Domenico Modugno	Chart discontinued	
October 6	"It's All in the Game"; Tommy Edwards	Chart discontinued	"It's All in the Game"; Tommy Edwards	Chart discontinued	
October 13	"It's All in the Game"; Tommy Edwards	Chart discontinued	"It's All in the Game"; Tommy Edwards	Chart discontinued	
October 20	Chart discontinued	Chart discontinued	"It's All in the Game"; Tommy Edwards	Chart discontinued	
October 27	Chart discontinued	Chart discontinued	"It's All in the Game"; Tommy Edwards	Chart discontinued	
November 3	Chart discontinued	Chart discontinued	"It's All in the Game"; Tommy Edwards	Chart discontinued	
November 10	Chart discontinued	Chart discontinued	"It's All in the Game"; Tommy Edwards	Chart discontinued	
November 17	Chart discontinued	Chart discontinued	"Tom Dooley"; The Kingston Trio	Chart discontinued	
November 24	Chart discontinued	Chart discontinued		Chart discontinued	
December 1	Chart discontinued	Chart discontinued		Chart discontinued	
December 8	Chart discontinued	Chart discontinued		Chart discontinued	
December 15	Chart discontinued	Chart discontinued		Chart discontinued	
December 22	Chart discontinued	Chart discontinued		Chart discontinued	
December 29	Chart discontinued	Chart discontinued		Chart discontinued	

== Hot 100 ==
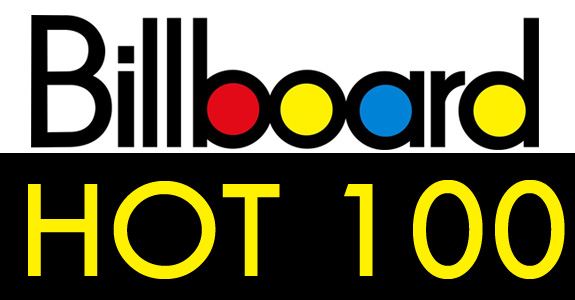

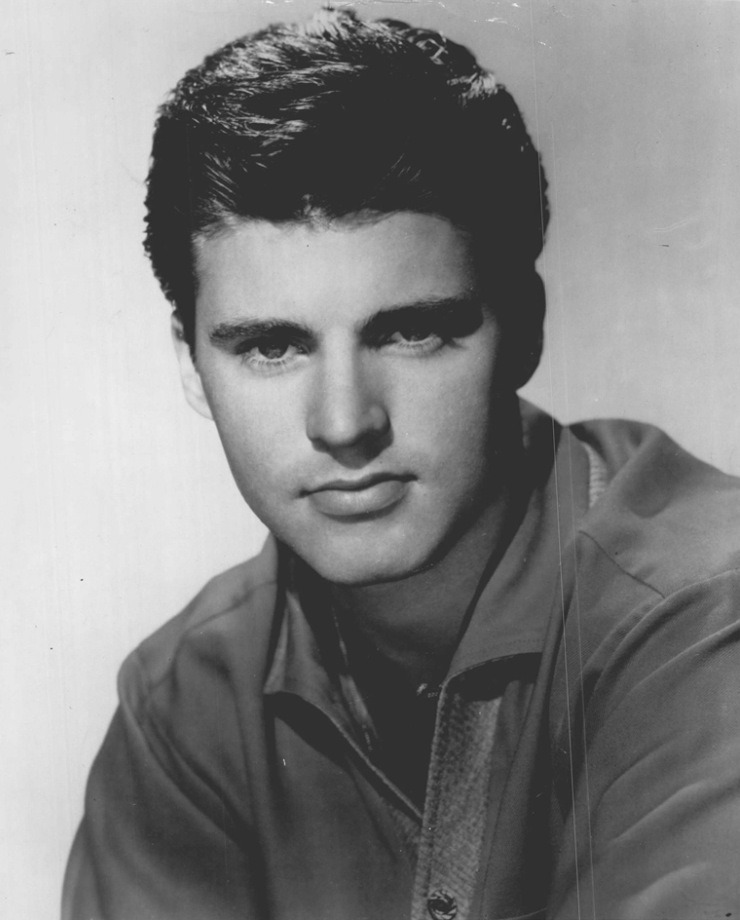
Ricky Nelson's (pictured in 1966) "Poor Little Fool" was the first song to top the Billboard Hot 100.

Key
†	Indicates best-performing single of 1958

No.	Issue date	Song	Artist(s)	Reference
1	August 4	"Poor Little Fool"	Ricky Nelson	
1	August 11	"Poor Little Fool"	Ricky Nelson	
2	August 18	"Volare (Nel blu dipinto di blu)"†	Domenico Modugno	
3	August 25	"Little Star"	The Elegants	
re	September 1	"Volare (Nel blu dipinto di blu)"†	Domenico Modugno	
re	September 8	"Volare (Nel blu dipinto di blu)"†	Domenico Modugno	
re	September 15	"Volare (Nel blu dipinto di blu)"†	Domenico Modugno	
re	September 22	"Volare (Nel blu dipinto di blu)"†	Domenico Modugno	
4	September 29	"It's All in the Game"	Tommy Edwards	
4	October 6	"It's All in the Game"	Tommy Edwards	
4	October 13	"It's All in the Game"	Tommy Edwards	
4	October 20	"It's All in the Game"	Tommy Edwards	
4	October 27	"It's All in the Game"	Tommy Edwards	
4	November 3	"It's All in the Game"	Tommy Edwards	
5	November 10	"It's Only Make Believe"	Conway Twitty	
6	November 17	"Tom Dooley"	The Kingston Trio	
re	November 24	"It's Only Make Believe"	Conway Twitty	
7	December 1	"To Know Him Is to Love Him"	The Teddy Bears	
7	December 8	"To Know Him Is to Love Him"	The Teddy Bears	
7	December 15	"To Know Him Is to Love Him"	The Teddy Bears	
8	December 22	"The Chipmunk Song (Christmas Don't Be Late)"	The Chipmunks with David Seville	
8	December 29	"The Chipmunk Song (Christmas Don't Be Late)"	The Chipmunks with David Seville	

=== Number-one artists ===
List of number-one artists by total weeks at number one
Position	Artist	Weeks at No. 1
1	Tommy Edwards	6
2	Domenico Modugno	5
3	The Teddy Bears	3
4	Ricky Nelson	2
4	Conway Twitty	2
4	The Chipmunks with David Seville	2
7	The Elegants	1
7	The Kingston Trio	1

== See also ==
- 1958 in music
- Lists of Billboard number-one singles
- List of Billboard Hot 100 top-ten singles in 1958
- List of Billboard Hot 100 number-one singles from 1958 to 1969
