= Ruby Winters =

American soul singer (1942–2016)

- Promo shot for the Millennium Records album release I Will (1978)

Background information
- Born: Ruby Forehand; January 18, 1942; Louisville, Kentucky, U.S.
- Died: August 7, 2016 (aged 74) Missouri City, Texas, U.S.
- Genre: Southern soul
- Instrument: Vocals
- Years active: 1966–1979
- Labels: Diamond, Certron, Polydor, Playboy, Creole UK, Millennium, K-tel

Ruby Winters (born Ruby Forehand; January 18, 1942 – August 7, 2016) was an American soul singer. Primarily recording in Nashville, Winters had several R&B hits from 1967 to 1974 but is best known for her 1977 UK Top Ten hit "I Will".

== Biography ==
=== Early life and career ===
Ruby Winters was born in Louisville, Kentucky to Charles Forehand Jr. and Lucille Inez Forehand. From the age of five, subsequent to her mother's death, Winters was raised in Cincinnati, Ohio by maternal grandmother Jeanetta Bradshaw, who encouraged Winters' penchant for singing, first expressed in church at age four. At age sixteen Winters - by then a wife and mother - began singing professionally, eventually expanding her performing focus beyond Louisville-area functions. By 1966 Winters was singing in the Charlie Daniels band, she and Daniels both being managed by Bill Sizemore: Sizemore also managed singer Ronnie Dove and was able to interest Dove's label, Diamond Records, in recording Winters. Her resultant debut single, "In the Middle of a Heartache" (a Charlie Daniels composition), was recorded at Sambo Studios in Louisville for a July 1966 release, reaching the top 30 on the hit parade for WAKY 790-Louisville.

The regional interest in Winters' debut single led Diamond Records a&r head Phil Kahl to himself oversee Winters' next recording session which took place in Nashville early in 1967. Before Kahl left New York City with the intent of producing distinct Nashville sessions for Winters and another Diamond Records act: Johnny Thunder, label president Joe Kolsky had suggested that Kahl record Winters and Thunder as a duo, Kolsky having noted the recent chart success of the Peaches and Herb remake of the traditional pop standard "Let's Fall in Love" and also the current Marvin Gaye/Kim Weston hit duet "It Takes Two". Kahl resultantly recorded Winters and Thunder as a duet remaking the 1950s pop hits "Teach Me Tonight" and "Make Love to Me". With "Make Love to Me" as the A-side the single was released in February 1967 and reached number 13 on the Billboard R&B charts in April 1967 and peaked at number 96 on the Billboard Hot 100.

After Winters reached the national R&B chart with her third solo release: "I Want Action", in the autumn of 1967, Diamond Records brought her to New York City to work with George Kerr who had recently produced R&B hits for the O'Jays and Linda Jones. With his regular collaborator: arranger Richard Tee, Kerr reteamed Winters with Johnny Thunder for "We Have Only One Life", released in February 1968 to become a chart shortfall. Kerr also had Winters record "Last Minute Miracle" which he had in 1967 recorded with the Shirelles for a regional hit single release and also (as "A Last Minute Miracle") with Linda Jones (with all three versions apparently sharing a common backing track); however Winters' version remains unreleased, "We Have Only One Life" remaining her only release for the year 1968. Winters nonetheless made a strong comeback in 1969 with four R&B hits beginning with her highest ranking U.S. solo hit, Winters' remake of the 1961 Chuck Jackson hit "I Don't Want to Cry", Winters reached number 15 on the R&B charts in February 1969 and number 99 on the Hot 100: two of Winters' next three singles were also remakes, specifically of "Just a Dream" and "Guess Who" (the respective originals being by Jimmy Clanton and Jesse Belvin).

In 1970 Winters' recording schedule again slowed with no releases until January 1971 when her recording of the hymn "Great Speckled Bird" was issued by Certron, who had purchased Diamond Records in early 1970. Following Certron's own closure in early 1971, their tapes were sold to Cutlass Records, Winters was announced as being on the roster of the Cutlass R&B subsidiary label Hotline, but Winters had no releases before Cutlass folded by 1973.

=== I Will and subsequent career ===
Winters had her first single release in almost three years in October 1973 when Polydor Records issued Winters' version of "I Will" a Dick Glasser composition which had charted in the 1960s for both Vic Dana and Dean Martin: while proving to be Winters' most significant recording, her version of "I Will" in original release only just reached the R&B top 40. Winters had one further single release on Polydor: "Love Me Now" (written by Paul Kelly), which reached number 1 on the hit parade for WAKY 790-Louisville whose tally for the year 1974 ranked "Love Me Now" at number 7. While not registering on the Billboard Hot 100 "Love Me Now" was ranked on the singles charts of both Cash Box and Record World with respective peak positions of number 95 and 91. Winters' two Polydor single releases were both recorded in Nashville with Stan Shulman and Dean Mathis producing, as was Winters' one-off Playboy Records single release: a version of the number 1 1972 Nilsson hit "Without You" which reached number 95 on the R&B charts in December 1975.

In the mid-1970s Winters in effect withdrew from recording, relocating in 1973 from Tennessee to Brevard County (Florida) and establishing herself as a top-rated Space Coast nightclub performer. However, in 1977 the London-based independent label Creole Records released Winters' recording of "I Will" which reached number 4 on the UK Singles Chart in December 1977. Reuniting with producer Stan Shulman, Winters recorded tracks - at Audio Media in Nashville and also Muscle Shoals - to complete an I Will album from which a follow-up single: "Come to Me", was released and reached number 11 in the UK.

In 1978, Millennium Records picked up the I Will album for U.S. release with the title cut returning Winters for a final time to the Billboard R&B chart, peaking at number 97. A follow-up U.S. single: "Treat Me Right", would not chart. In the UK two further singles were issued from "I Will" the first of which: "I Won't Mention It Again", reached number 45 UK. Winters would reach the UK chart for a fourth and final time with "Baby Lay Down" (number 43 UK) from the 1979 album Songbird (#NE 1045), the latter being an expansion of the I Will album with new tracks - including "Baby Lay Down" - recorded in Nashville released on Stan Shulman's K-tel Records: another of the new Songbird tracks: "Back to the Love", would in August 1979 become the final release of Winters' recording career.

=== Death ===
Ruby Winters Jenkins, a resident of Missouri City, Texas, died on August 7, 2016, at the age of 74. She was preceded in death by her husbands, George Yates and William Jenkins. She was survived by her five children.

== Discography ==
=== Albums ===
Year	Album	Label	UK	Certifications
1978	I Will (Note: Issued as Ruby Winters in some territories.)	Millennium Records	27	
"—" denotes releases that did not chart.

Compilations

Year	Album	Label	UK	Certifications
1979	Songbird	K-Tel Records	31	BPI: Silver
1979	Baby Lay Down	Creole Records	—	
1993	Ruby Winters	Rhino Records	—	
1999	The Best of Ruby Winters	Pegasus	—	
2012	For The Good Times	MediaWorld	—	
2026	Diamonds	Charly Records	—	
"—" denotes releases that did not chart.

=== Singles ===
Year	Single	Chart positions				Album	Recording info
Year	Single	US	US R&B	UK	CAN	Album	Recording info
1966	"In the Middle of a Heartache"	—	—	—	—		Produced by Ray Allen at Sambo Studios Louisville (Kentucky)
1967	"Make Love to Me" (with Johnny Thunder)	96	13	—	—		Produced by Phil Kahl and Buddy Killen in Nashville (Tennessee)
1967	"The Bells of St Mary's"	—	—	—	—		Produced by Phil Kahl and Buddy Killen in Nashville (Tennessee)
1967	"I Want Action"	109	47	—	—		Produced by Phil Kahl and Bill Justis in Nashville
1968	"We Only Have One Life" (Let's Live It Together) (with Johnny Thunder)	—	—	—	—		Produced by George Kerr at Broadway Recording Studio in New York City
1969	"I Don't Want to Cry"	97	15	—	74		Produced by Papa Don Schroeder in Nashville
1969	"Just a Dream"	—	40	—	—		Produced by Marlin Greene at Quinvy Studios, Sheffield (Alabama)
1969	"Always David"	121	23	—	79		Produced by Marlin Greene at Quinvy Studios, Sheffield (Alabama)
1969	"Guess Who"	99	19	—	63		Produced by Marlin Greene at Quinvy Studios, Sheffield (Alabama)
1971	"Great Speckled Bird"	—	—	—	—		Produced by Aubrey Mayhew in Nashville
1973	"I Will"	—	39	4 (Note: Released in the UK in 1977.)	—	I Will	Produced by Dean Mathis and Stan Shulman in Nashville
1974	"Love Me Now"	—	—	—	—	I Will	Produced by Dean Mathis and Marc Mathis at Sound Shop, Nashville
1975	"Without You"	—	95	—	—		Produced by Dean Mathis and Stan Shulman at Woodland Sound Studios, Nashville
1978	"Come to Me"	—	—	11	—	I Will	Produced by S. J. Productions (Stan Shulman) at Audio Media Studios in Nashville or at Muscle Shoals Sound Studio
1978	"I Won't Mention It Again"	—	—	45	—	I Will	Produced by S. J. Productions (Stan Shulman) at Audio Media Studios in Nashville or at Muscle Shoals Sound Studio
1978	"Treat Me Right"	—	—	—	—	I Will	Produced by Stan Shulman (associated producers David Thompson and Jerry Middleton) at Muscle Shoals Sound Studio
1978	"For the Good Times"	—	—	— (Note: "For the Good Times" peaked at 136 in the BMRB Top 200 monthly singles charts in December 1978.)	—	I Will	Produced by S. J. Productions (Stan Shulman) in Nashville
1979	"Baby Lay Down"	—	—	43	—	Songbird	Produced by Stan Shulman and David Thompson in Nashville
1979	"Back to the Love"	—	—	— (Note: "Back to the Love" peaked at 185 in the BMRB Top 200 monthly singles charts in September 1979.)	—	Songbird	Produced by Stan Shulman and David Thompson in Nashville
2013	"Better"	—	—	—	—	Diamonds	
2022	"Last Minute Miracle	—	—	—	—	Diamonds	
2023	"I Can’t Help But Let You"	—	—	—	—	Diamonds	
"—" denotes releases that did not chart or were not released in that territory.
