= Jacky Ward =

American country singer

- Born: November 18, 1942 (age 83)
- Origin: Groveton, Texas, United States
- Genres: Country
- Occupation: Singer
- Instrument: Vocals
- Years active: 1972–1982
- Labels: Target; Mercury; Asylum

Jacky Ward (born November 18, 1942, Groveton, Texas, United States) is an American country music artist. He is popularly known worldwide for his 1977 hit single "Fools Fall in Love".

Between 1972 and 1982, he released four albums with Mercury Records, and charted more than 15 singles on the Billboard Hot Country Singles (now Hot Country Songs charts. His highest-peaking single, "A Lover's Question", reached number three on the charts in 1978. In Ward's career, he recorded three duets with Reba McEntire, including McEntire's first top-40 country hit, "Three Sheets in the Wind". After leaving Mercury in the early 1980s, Ward briefly signed with Asylum Records, releasing a cover of Ricky Nelson's "Travelin' Man" that year. Although he released four singles for the label, Ward never issued an album on Asylum, and left the country music business in the late 1980s.

In the 1980s, he also hosted a show on The Nashville Network called Dancin' USA.

Jacky Ward left the country music industry in 1985. He has been a minister and teacher of the gospel for over 20 years. He is presently the interim pastor of West Corinth Baptist Church in Corinth, Mississippi.

== Discography ==
=== Albums ===
Year	Album	US Country	Label
1972	Big Blue Diamond	—	Target
1977	A Lover's Question	41	Mercury
1978	Rainbow	46	Mercury
1979	The Best of Jacky Ward	—	Mercury
1980	More!	—	Mercury
1982	Night After Night	45	Asylum
1983	Greatest Hits	—	Premier

=== Singles ===
Year	Single	Chart Positions		Album
Year	Single	US Country	CAN Country	Album
1962	"I Want You/Little Boy With A Lonely Heart"**			Single only
1972	"Big Blue Diamond"	39	—	Big Blue Diamond
1973	"Dream Weaver"	88	—	Single only
1975	"Stealin'"	50	—	A Lover's Question
1975	"Dance Her by Me (One More Time)"	38	45	A Lover's Question
1976	"She'll Throw Stones at You"	92	—	A Lover's Question
1976	"I Never Said It Would Be Easy"	24	26	A Lover's Question
1977	"Texas Angel"	31	—	A Lover's Question
1977	"Why Not Tonight"	69	—	A Lover's Question
1977	"Fools Fall in Love"	9	16	A Lover's Question
1978	"A Lover's Question"^{A}	3	6	A Lover's Question
1978	"Three Sheets in the Wind"/ "I'd Really Love to See You Tonight" (with Reba McEntire)	20	—	single only
1978	"I Want to Be in Love"	24	—	Rainbow
1978	"Rhythm of the Rain"	11	9	Rainbow
1979	"Wisdom of a Fool"	8	—	Rainbow
1979	"That Makes Two of Us" (with Reba McEntire)	26	—	The Best of Jacky Ward
1979	"You're My Kind of Woman"	14	—	The Best of Jacky Ward
1980	"I'd Do Anything for You"	32	—	The Best of Jacky Ward
1980	"Save Your Heart for Me"	8	—	More!
1980	"That's the Way a Cowboy Rocks and Rolls"	7	—	More!
1981	"Somethin' on the Radio"	13	—	More!
1982	"Travelin' Man"	32	—	Night After Night
1982	"Take the Mem'ry When You Go"	57	—	Night After Night
1983	"The Night's Almost Over"	85	—	Singles only
1988	"Can't Get to You from Here"	83	—	Singles only

- ^{A}Peaked at number six on Bubbling Under Hot 100 and number 98 on the RPM Top Singles chart in Canada.
