= Oh Julie (The Crescendos song) =

Single by The Crescendos
- B-side: "My Little Girl"
- Released: November 1957
- Genre: Doo-wop
- Length: 2:35
- Label: Nasco
- Songwriter(s): Noel Ball, Ken Moffitt

The Crescendos singles chronology
"Oh Julie" (1957)	"School Girl" (1958)

"Oh Julie" is a song written by Noel Ball and Ken Moffitt and performed by The Crescendos featuring Janice Green. It reached #4 on the U.S. R&B chart and #5 on the U.S. pop chart in 1958.

The single ranked #47 on Billboard's Year-End top 50 singles of 1958.

== Other versions ==
- Otis Williams and the Charms released a version of the song as the B-side to their 1957 single "Could This Be Magic".
- Jan and Dean released a version of the song as the B-side to their 1961 single "Don't Fly Away".
- Dale Ward featuring Robin Ward released a version of the song as the B-side] to their 1963 single "Letter from Sherry".
