= Vito Picone =

American singer

- Born: 20 March 1941 (age 84); South Beach, Staten Island, New York, U.S.
- Occupations: Singer, actor

Vito Joseph Picone (born March 20, 1941) is the former lead singer of The Elegants and is the only remaining original member. He has also played bit parts in Goodfellas, Analyze This, and The Sopranos.

For the past twenty-two years he has hosted Let the Good Times Roll on Staten Island Cable, a nostalgia talk/variety music show.

== Personal life ==
Picone was born in and has lived most of his life in South Beach, Staten Island, New York, born to an ethnically Italian immigrant family.

== Filmography ==
- Goodfellas (1990) - Himself
- The Sopranos (1999, TV Series) - Himself
- Analyze This (1999) - Mobster
- The Irishman (2019) - Himself/Vila d'Roma manager
