= A Lover's Question =

1958 song by Clyde McPhatter

Single by Clyde McPhatter
- B-side: "I Can't Stand Up Alone"
- Released: September 1958
- Recorded: 1958
- Genre: Soul
- Length: 2:36
- Label: Atlantic Records
- Songwriters: Brook Benton; Jimmy T. Williams

Clyde McPhatter singles chronology
"Lover Please" (1958)	"A Lover's Question" (1958)	"Lovey Dovey" (1959)

"A Lover's Question" is a 1958 Pop, R&B hit for Clyde McPhatter. The single was written by Brook Benton and Jimmy T. Williams and was Clyde McPhatter's most successful Pop and R&B release. The bass singer is Noah Hopkins. "A Lover's Question" made it to #6 on the Billboard Hot 100 and was #1 for one week on the R&B chart.

== Background ==
- The best-known version of the song is in mono. However, a stereo version was released on the LP Atlantic History of Rhythm & Blues, Vol. 4, along with several other rare stereo versions of late 1950s Atlantic hits.

== Jacky Ward version ==
"A Lover's Question"

Single by Jacky Ward

from the album A Lover's Question
- B-side: "She Belongs to Me"
- Released: February 1978
- Genre: Country
- Length: 3:01
- Label: Mercury
- Songwriters: Brook Benton; Jimmy T. Williams
- Producer: Jerry Kennedy

Jacky Ward singles chronology
"Fools Fall in Love" (1977)	"A Lover's Question" (1978)	"Three Sheets in the Wind" (1978)

In 1978, Jacky Ward had a successful remake of the song, peaking at #3 on the Billboard Hot Country Singles chart.

== Charts ==
=== Weekly charts ===
Chart (1978)	Peak position
US Hot Country Songs (Billboard)	3
US Easy Listening (Billboard)	32
US Billboard Hot 100	106
Canadian RPM Country Tracks	6
Canadian RPM Top Singles	98

=== Year-end charts ===
Chart (1978)	Position
US Hot Country Songs (Billboard)	42

== Other cover versions ==
- In 1961, a cover by Ernestine Anderson reached #98.
- In 1969, a cover by Otis Redding reached #48.
- Jay and the Americans released a cover version of the song on their 1970 album, Wax Museum, Vol. 1.
- In 1975, Loggins & Messina's cover reached #89.
- Country singer Del Reeves took the song to #14 on the Hot Country Singles chart in 1970.

== See also ==
- List of number-one R&B singles of 1958 (U.S.)
