= He's Got the Whole World in His Hands =

Spiritual folk song lyrics

He's Got the Whole World in His Hands

"He's Got the Whole World in His Hands" is a traditional African-American spiritual, first published in 1927. It became an international pop hit in 1957–58 in a recording by British singer Laurie London, which is one of the best-selling gospel songs of all time. The song has also been recorded by many other singers and choirs, including Mahalia Jackson, Marian Anderson, Judy Garland and Nina Simone and in Germany by Conny Froboess.

== Traditional music sources ==
The song was first published in the paperbound hymnal Spirituals Triumphant, Old and New in 1927. In 1933, it was collected by Frank Warner from the singing of Sue Thomas in North Carolina. It was also recorded by other collectors such as Robert Sonkin of the Library of Congress, who recorded it in Gee's Bend, Alabama in 1941. That version is still available at the Library's American Folklife Center.

Frank Warner performed the song during the 1940s and 1950s, and introduced it to the American folk scene. Warner recorded it on the Elektra album American Folk Songs and Ballads in 1952. It was quickly picked up by both American gospel singers and British skiffle and pop musicians.

== Laurie London recording ==
"He's Got the Whole World in His Hands"

Single by Laurie London with the Geoff Love Orchestra and Chorus
- B-side: "The Cradle Rock"
- Released: 1957
- Recorded: 1957
- Genre: Folk-pop, gospel
- Label: Parlophone
- Songwriters: Robert Lindon, William Henry

The song made the popular song charts in a 1957 recording by British singer Laurie London with the Geoff Love Orchestra, which reached #12 on the UK singles chart in late 1957. The songwriting on London's record was credited to "Robert Lindon" and "William Henry", which were pseudonyms used by British writers Jack Waller and Ralph Reader, who had used the song in their 1956 stage musical Wild Grows the Heather.

Laurie London's version then rose to #1 of the Most Played by Jockeys song list in the USA and went to #3 on the R&B charts in 1958. The record reached #2 on Billboard's Best Sellers in Stores survey and #1 in Cashbox's Top 60. It became a gold record and was the most successful record by a British male in the 1950s in the USA. In Canada the song reached #2. It was the first gospel song to hit #1 on a U.S. pop singles chart; The Staple Singers' "I'll Take You There" hit #1 on the Billboard Hot 100 in 1972, "Put Your Hand in the Hand (of the Man)" by Ocean peaked at #2 in 1971; and "Oh Happy Day" by the Edwin Hawkins Singers reached #4 in 1969.

== Certifications ==
Certifications for "He's Got the Whole World in His Hands"
| Region | Certification | Certified units/sales |
|---|---|---|
| United States (RIAA) | Gold | 1,000,000^{^} |
^{^} Shipments figures based on certification alone.

== Covers and adaptations ==
Mahalia Jackson's version made the Billboard top 100 singles chart, reaching number 69.

In 1953, Marian Anderson sang the song before a live television audience of 60 million people, broadcast live over the NBC and CBS networks, as part of The Ford 50th Anniversary Show. Anderson recorded another version (in Oslo on August 29, 1958 and released on the single His Master's Voice 45-6075 AL 6075 and on the extended play En aften på "Casino Non Stop", introdusert av Arne Hestenes (His Master's Voice 7EGN 26. It was arranged by Harry Douglas and Ed Kirkeby).

In 1964 Judy Garland sang it in a duet with her daughter Liza Minnelli at Minnelli's 'official presentation'. The concert was released as a double album, "Live" at the London Palladium.

In February 1978, English football team Nottingham Forest F.C. released "We've Got the Whole World in Our Hands" (Warner K17110) in conjunction with local band Paper Lace; the B side featured "The Forest March". The song has become a favourite in British football grounds, with the lyrics adapted in various ways; for instance, "We're the worst team in the League" has been heard at Rushden & Diamonds matches as well as Crystal Palace F.C. matches.

In 1987, American country and Christian singer Cristy Lane recorded the song and released it as a single via LS Records. Lane's version was released as a double A-side single, peaking at number 88 on the Billboard Hot Country Songs chart.

In November 2022, Jason Manford released the single "Assembly Bangers", a song he had been closing his standup show with as the song came after "This Little Light of Mine" and before "When I Needed a Neighbour" in the medley as the nation will donate all profits to the Trussell Trust's Emergency Fund Appeal.

In September 2024, Craig David released the single "In Your Hands", based on the song.

== See also ==
- Christian child's prayer § Spirituals
- Salvator Mundi – painting of Christ with orb (Earth) in left hand.
- List of 1950s one-hit wonders in the United States
