= The Crescendos =

US musical group

The Crescendos were an early American rock and roll group from Nashville, Tennessee.

Formed in 1957 by five men who attended Cumberland High School in Nashville, the Crescendos succeeded with the song "Oh Julie" the following year, which rose to #4 on the U.S. Black Singles chart and #5 on the Billboard Hot 100. George Lanius, who was lead singer for the quintet, told Wayne Jancik in The Billboard Book of One-Hit Wonders that a Nashville DJ named Noel Ball discovered the group playing talent shows. "He took us to Nasco [Records]. And he gave us 'Oh Julie' to record. The label says Ball and Ken Moffit wrote it, but if the truth were to be known, it was Moffit's song." The record sold over one million copies, earning a gold disc. The song featured backing vocals by Janice Green, who happened to be auditioning at the recording studio where the single was recorded. They recorded two more singles for Nasco which flopped, then disbanded by 1959. Their Oh Julie album (Guest Star GS 1453) contains the title song and seven others. The album cover photo reveals that the four singers are all White, even though the single "Oh Julie" was popular among Black listeners as well. Reportedly all members of the Crescendos lived within 15 miles of each other at least 30 years after "Oh Julie" was a hit, but they avoided performing together in favor of working on individual careers outside of the music industry.

George Lanius (born on September 4, 1939) died on April 21, 1996, at age 56.

== Members ==
- George Lanius
- James Lanius (George's cousin)
- Ken Brigham
- Tom Fortner
- Jim Hall
