= Little Star (The Elegants song) =

Single by The Elegants
- B-side: "Getting Dizzy"
- Released: 1958
- Genre: Doo-wop; pop
- Length: 2:42
- Label: Apt
- Songwriters: Vito Picone, Arthur Venosa

"Little Star" is a song recorded by The Elegants. Members Vito Picone and Arthur Venosa co-wrote the lyrics. The music was adapted from "Twinkle, Twinkle, Little Star". In 1958, the single topped both the R&B Best Sellers list and the Billboard Hot 100. It was their only song to ever chart. Phil Spector reviewed it as an "awful good record". The band Randy & the Rainbows covered the song in 1963.

== Charts ==
=== Weekly charts ===
Chart (1958)	Peak position
Canada CHUM Chart	3
US Billboard Hot 100	1

Chart (1958–2018)	Position
US Billboard Hot 100	595

== See also ==
- List of Hot 100 number-one singles of 1958 (U.S.)
- List of number-one R&B singles of 1958 (U.S.)
