= Topsy (instrumental) =

1937 instrumental composition by Edgar Battle and Eddie Durham

Single by Count Basie and His Orchestra
- Released: August 9, 1937
- Genre: jazz
- Length: 3:12
- Label: Decca
- Songwriters: Eddie Durham, Edgar Battle

"Topsy" is an instrumental by Count Basie and His Orchestra, released on August 9, 1937, written by Edgar Battle and Eddie Durham. It became a #14 pop hit for bandleader Benny Goodman in 1938.

In 1958, drummer Cozy Cole recorded the song and issued it in two parts as a single. The A-side ("Topsy I") made it to #27 on the Billboard Hot 100 chart, while the B-side ("Topsy II") reached #3 on the Hot 100 chart and #1 on the Billboard Rhythm & Blues chart, staying atop the latter for six weeks. The two songs were simultaneous hits; they were closest together on the Hot 100 chart for the week ending November 2, 1958, when Topsy I was at #27 and Topsy II was at #4.

== Notable versions ==
- Count Basie Orchestra
- Charlie Christian (credited as "Swing to Bop")
- Jimmy Giuffre, on his album Western Suite
- The Chico Hamilton Quintet, on their album Chico Hamilton Quintet in Hi Fi
- Meco (1977)
- Clare Fischer (1995), on his solo album Just me
