= My True Love =

Single by Jack Scott
- B-side: "Leroy"
- Released: 1958
- Recorded: 1958
- Genre: Pop
- Label: Carlton
- Composer(s): Jack Scott

"My True Love" is a popular song written and recorded by Jack Scott in 1958. The single was released on the Carlton label and reached number three on the Billboard Hot 100 on August 18, 1958. It became Scott's first gold record.

The B-side of the record, "Leroy", reached No. 25 on the same chart.

== Charts ==
Chart (1958)	Peak position
US Billboard Hot 100	3
US Billboard R&B Best Sellers in Stores	5
Canadian CHUM Singles	1
UK Singles Chart	9
