= Laurie London =

English singer (born 1944)

- Born: 19 January 1944 (age 82); Bethnal Green, East London, England
- Occupation: Singer
- Instrument: Vocals

Lawrence London (born 19 January 1944) is an English singer, who achieved fame as a boy singer of the 1950s, for both his gospel and novelty songs recording in both English and German. He is best known for his hit single of the spiritual song "He's Got the Whole World in His Hands".

== Life and career ==
London was born in Bethnal Green, East London. At the age of thirteen, whilst a pupil at The Davenant Foundation Grammar School in Whitechapel Road, he made an up-tempo version of "He's Got the Whole World in His Hands" with the Geoff Love Orchestra for Parlophone Records (R4359) which was picked up by its co-owned American sister label Capitol Records (F3891). In April 1958, it reached number 1 on Billboard's "Most Played by Jockeys" chart and remained there for four weeks, but it was to be his only hit record. It was the most successful record by a British male in the 1950s in the United States, topping the charts. It sold over one million copies, and was awarded a gold disc by the RIAA in 1958.

According to one online source, "he worked at the Abbey Road Studios, London with such renowned record producers as Norman Newell and George Martin" and "special songs were written for him, tailored to the German taste in popular music, and he recorded them in Cologne and Munich with producer, Nils Nobach." He performed at the 1959 Deutsches Schlager-Festival (German Hit-Festival) singing "Bum Ladda Bum Bum".

London is mentioned along with his hit song "He's Got the Whole World in His Hands" in the Colin MacInnes novel Absolute Beginners.

London has a credit as "singer" in the 1961 German film … und du mein Schatz bleibst hier and he also appeared in the 1958 Danish film Soldaterkammerater, where he performed "He's Got the Whole World in His Hands".

He originally retired from singing at the age of nineteen. Later cover versions of the Cliff Richard hit "Lucky Lips" (1963) and "The Bells of St. Mary" (CBS, 1966) went unnoticed.

After withdrawing from showbusiness London ran a hotel in Petworth, West Sussex, which he sold in 2000.

== Recordings ==
- "He's Got the Whole World in His Hands"
- "Bum-Ladda-Bum-Bum (Boom-Ladda-Boom-Boom)"
- "Auf wiederseh'n Marlen"
- "Banjo Boy"
- "Basin Street Blues"
- "Bells of St. Mary's"
- "Boomerang"
- "Casey Jones"
- "Cradle Rock"
- "Darktown Strutters' Ball"
- "Darling Sue"
- "Down by the Riverside"
- "God's Little Acre"
- "Gospel Train"
- "Handed Down"
- "Hear Them Bells"
- "Hey, Hey - es wird Musik gemacht"
- "Hopalong Cassidy"
- "I'll Make You Forget Him"
- "I'm Afraid"
- "I'm Gonna Walk and Talk with My Lord"
- "I Gotta Robe"
- "Ich bin nicht arm, ich bin nicht reich (I'm Not Poor, I'm Not Rich)"
- "Itsy Bitsy Teenie Weenie Honolulu Strand Bikini"
- "Joshua Fit the Battle of Jericho"
- "Lucky Lips"
- "Mamatschi"
- "Mandolino Pling Plang Plong"
- "My Mother"
- "Nix Fraulein, nix Mademoiselle"
- "Old Time Religion"
- "Pick a Bale of Cotton"
- "Pretty Eyed Baby"
- "Roll on Spring"
- "Sad Songs"
- "Schenk mir einen Traum"
- "Schöne weisse Rose"
- "Schritt für Schritt"
- "(She Sells) Sea Shells"
- "Three O'Clock"
- "Today's Teardrops"
- "Up Above My Head"
- "Wild und heiss"
