= Jimmy Clanton =

American singer (born 1938)

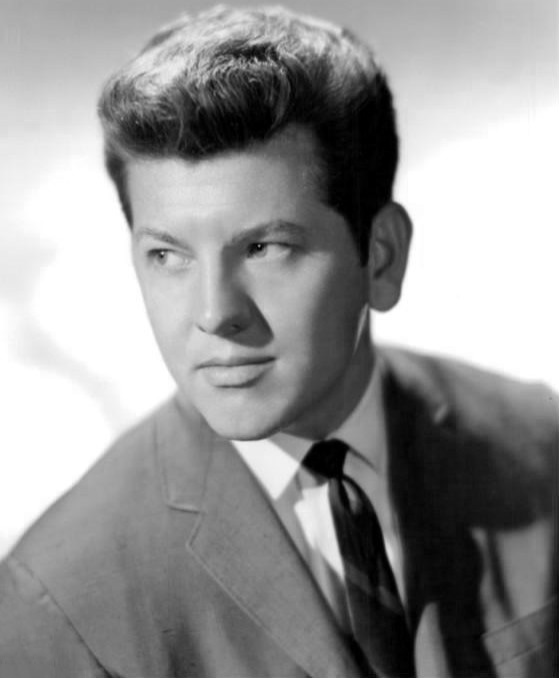
- Clanton in 1957

Background information
- Born: September 2, 1938 (age 87); Golden Meadow, Louisiana, U.S.
- Genres: Rhythm and blues, swamp pop
- Occupation: Singer
- Years active: 1956–present
- Labels: Ace, Philips, Mala, Imperial, Laurie
- Website: jimmyclanton.com

Jimmy Clanton (born September 2, 1938) is an American singer who became known as the "swamp pop R&B teenage idol". His band recorded a hit song "Just a Dream" which Clanton had written in 1958 for the Ace Records label. It reached number four on the Billboard chart and sold a million copies. Clanton performed on Dick Clark's American Bandstand and toured with popular artists like Fats Domino, Jerry Lee Lewis and the Platters.

== Career ==
Clanton formed his first band called the Rockets in 1956 while attending Baton Rouge High School.

One of the few white singers to come out of the New Orleans R&B/rock & roll sound, he rode the crest of the popular teen-music wave in the 1950s and 1960s. His records charted in the U.S. Top 40 seven times (all released on Ace); his Top 10 records were: the song "Just a Dream," (Pop number four, R&B number one in August 1958, credited to 'Jimmy Clanton and His Rockets'), "Go, Jimmy, Go" (peaked at number five in early 1960) and "Venus in Blue Jeans" (peaked at number seven on October 6, 1962, written by Howard Greenfield and Jack Keller). In early 1961, Clanton was drafted and spent the next two years in the U.S. Army, continuing to have chart successes with "Don't Look at Me", "Because I Do", and the aforementioned "Venus in Blue Jeans". His only hit in the UK Singles Chart was "Another Sleepless Night", a Greenfield/Neil Sedaka composition that spent one week at number 50 in July 1960.

Clanton starred in a rock and roll movie produced by DJ Alan Freed called Go, Johnny, Go! and later starred in Teenage Millionaire, with music arranged and produced by Dr. John and arranger/trumpeter Charlie Miller. During the late 1950s and early 1960s, Clanton was managed by Cosimo Matassa, the New Orleans recording studio owner and engineer. In May 1960, Ace Records announced in Billboard that Philadelphia had proclaimed the week of May 16 to be "Jimmy Clanton Week."

In 1963, American Bandstand signed Clanton to Dick Clark's Caravan of Stars national U.S. tour which was scheduled to perform its 15th show on the night of November 22, 1963, at the Memorial Auditorium in Dallas, Texas, until suddenly the Friday-evening event had to be canceled moments after U.S. President John F. Kennedy was assassinated that afternoon while touring Dallas in an open-car caravan.

Clanton became a disc jockey at WHEX in Columbia, Pennsylvania, between 1972 and 1976 and performed in an oldies revue also in the 1970s, The Masters of Rock 'n' Roll, with Troy Shondell, Ray Peterson, and Ronnie Dove. He had a religious conversion in August 1980. Clanton appeared at the New Orleans Jazz & Heritage Festival in 1995 and performed with Frankie Ford.

In 2022, Clanton published a book co-authored with Sandy Weeks titled Just A Dream From Singer to Servant of God! The Story of Jimmy Clanton. It tells his story of life as a star and also about the unexpected journey of faith that began in 1980.

== Honors and awards ==
Clanton was inducted into the Museum of the Gulf Coast Hall of Fame, which also has inducted such performers as Tex Ritter, Janis Joplin, ZZ Top and B. J. Thomas.

On April 14, 2007, at a "Legends of Louisiana Celebration & Inductions" concert in Mandeville, Louisiana, Jimmy Clanton was inducted into the Louisiana Music Hall of Fame.

Clanton's records "Just a Dream," "A Letter to an Angel," "Ship on a Stormy Sea," and "Venus in Blue Jeans" each sold over one million copies, and were awarded gold discs.

== Personal life ==
Clanton married Roxanne Faye Edtmiller on December 8, 1962, and they have three children.

== Discography ==
=== Albums ===
- 1959: Just A Dream (Ace)
- 1960: Jimmy's Happy (Ace)
- 1960: Jimmy's Blue (Ace)
- 1960: Jimmy's Happy/Jimmy's Blue (Ace)
- 1961: Teenage Millionaire (Ace)
- 1961: My Best To You (Ace)
- 1962: Venus In Blue Jeans (Ace)
- 1964: The Best Of Jimmy Clanton (Philips)
- 2007: Born Again (Snailworx)
- 2014: Everybody Needs Love (no label)

=== Singles ===
Year	Title (A-side, B-side) Both sides from same album except where indicated	Label	Chart positions			Album
Year	Title (A-side, B-side) Both sides from same album except where indicated	Label	U.S.	U.S. R&B	Canada	Album
1957	"I Trusted You" b/w "That's You Baby" (Non-album track)	Ace 537	—	—	—	My Best to You
1958	"Just a Dream" b/w "You Aim to Please" (Non-album track)	Ace 546	4	1	5	Just a Dream
1958	"A Letter to an Angel" /	Ace 551	25	—	46	Just a Dream
1958	"A Part of Me"	Ace 551	38	28	—	Just a Dream
1959	"My Love Is Strong" b/w "Ship on a Stormy Sea"	Ace 560	—	—		Just a Dream
1959	"My Own True Love" b/w "Little Boy in Love"	Ace 567	33	—	24	My Best to You
1959	"Go, Jimmy, Go" b/w "I Trusted You"	Ace 575	5	19	1	My Best to You
1960	"Another Sleepless Night"^{A} b/w "I'm Gonna Try"	Ace 585	22	—	22	Jimmy's Blue
1960	"The Slave" b/w "Rambling Girl"	Ace S1860	—	—	—	Non-album tracks
1960	"Come Back" /	Ace 600	63	—	—	My Best to You
1960	"Wait"	Ace 600	91	—	—	My Best to You
1961	"What Am I Gonna Do" b/w "If I"	Ace 607	50	—	36	My Best to You
1961	"What Am I Living For" b/w "Wedding Bells"	Vin 1028	—	—	—	Non-album tracks
1961	"Down the Aisle" b/w "No Longer Blue" (Both sides: Jimmy Clanton and Mary Ann Mobley)	Ace 616	—	—	—	Non-album tracks
1961	"I Just Wanna Make Love" b/w "Don't Look at Me" (from Jimmy's Blue)	Ace 622	—	—	—	Venus in Blue Jeans
1961	"Lucky in Love with You" b/w "Not Like a Brother"	Ace 634	—	—	—	Venus in Blue Jeans
1961	"Twist on Little Girl" b/w "Wayward Love"	Ace 641	—	—	—	Venus in Blue Jeans
1962	"Just a Moment" b/w "Because I Do"	Ace 655	—	—	—	Venus in Blue Jeans
1962	"Venus in Blue Jeans" b/w "Highway Bound" (from Jimmy's Blue)	Ace 8001	7	—	5	Venus in Blue Jeans
1962	"Darkest Street in Town" b/w "Dreams of a Fool"	Ace 8005	77	—	—	Venus in Blue Jeans
1963	"Another Day, Another Heartache" b/w "This Endless Night"	Ace 8006	—	—	—	Non-album tracks
1963	"Cindy" b/w "I Care Enough (To Give the Very Best)"	Ace 8007	—	—	—	Non-album tracks
1963	"Red Don't Go with Blue" b/w "All the Words in the World"	Philips 40161	115	—	—	Non-album tracks
1964	"I'll Step Aside" b/w "I Won't Cry Anymore"	Philips 40181	—	—	—	Non-album tracks
1964	"A Million Drums" b/w "If I'm a Fool for Loving You"	Philips 40208	—	—	—	The Best of Jimmy Clanton
1964	"Follow the Sun" b/w "Lock the Windows, Lock the Doors" (Non-album track)	Philips 40219	—	—	—	The Best of Jimmy Clanton
1965	"Hurting Each Other" b/w "Don't Keep Your Friends Away"	Mala 500	—	—	—	Non-album tracks
1965	"Everything I Touch Turns To Tears" b/w "That Special Way"	Mala 516	—	—	—	Non-album tracks
1967	"C'mon Jim" b/w "The Absence of Lisa"	Imperial 66242	—	—	—	Non-album tracks
1967	"I'll Be Loving You" b/w "Calico Junction"	Imperial 66274	—	—	—	Non-album tracks
1969	"Curly"^{B} b/w "I'll Never Forget Your Love"	Laurie LR-3508	97	—	—	Non-album tracks
1969	"Tell Me" b/w "I'll Never Forget Your Love"	Laurie LR-3534	—	—	—	Non-album tracks
1971	"The Coolest Hot Pants" b/w "The Coolest Hot Pants" (Piccolino Pops)	Spiral GS-3406	—	—	—	—
1976	"Old Rock'n Roller (Will It Happen Again)" b/w "Old Rock'n Roller (Will It Happen Again)"	Starcrest GRT-078	—	—	—	—
1978	"You Kissed A Fool Good-bye" b/w "I Wanna Go Home"	Star Fire S-104	—	—	—	—

- ^{A}Also peaked at number 50 in UK Singles Chart
- ^{B}Also peaked at number 88 in Canadian RPM Top Tracks
