= Just a Dream (Jimmy Clanton song) =

Single by Jimmy Clanton and His Rockets
- B-side: "You Aim To Please"
- Released: July 1958
- Recorded: 1958
- Studio: Cosimo (New Orleans, Louisiana)
- Genre: Pop
- Length: 2:34
- Label: Ace Records
- Songwriter(s): Jimmy Clanton, Cosimo Matassa

Jimmy Clanton and His Rockets singles chronology
"I Trusted You" (1957)	"Just a Dream (Jimmy Clanton song)" (1958)	"A Letter to an Angel" (1958)

"Just a Dream" is a 1958 single by Jimmy Clanton and His Rockets released on the Ace Records label. The actual record-label states that it was written by Clanton and Cosimo Matassa (Matassa was Clanton's manager), but other sources state that Clanton was the sole composer. Original words written by Regina F Phillips and sent to Lew Tobin which were copyrighted. Regina never received credit for the song lyrics.

Apparently Lew Tobin was a bit of a song shark as noted by Randy Johnson.

== Chart performance ==
The single went to number one on the R&B Best Sellers lists for one week and peaked at number four on the Hot 100. In Canada it reached number five.

== Cover versions ==
- Ruby Winters covered the song in 1969 and it peaked at #40 on the US Best Selling Rhythm & Blues Singles chart.
