= Patricia (Perez Prado song) =

Single by Pérez Prado

from the album Patricia
- Released: June 1958
- Genre: Mambo
- Length: 2:19
- Label: RCA

"Patricia" is a popular song by Pérez Prado with lyrics by Bob Marcucci, published in 1958. The song is best known in an instrumental version by Prado's orchestra that became the last record to ascend to No.1 on the Billboard Jockeys and Top 100 charts, both of which gave way the next week to the then newly-introduced Billboard Hot 100 chart. The song was also No. 1 on the R&B Best Sellers for two weeks. Prado's 1958 recording became a gold record. Billboard ranked it as the No. 5 song for 1958.

Prado's "Patricia" entered the U.S. Cash Box chart week ending June 7, 1958, making No. 1 on that chart for four weeks from the week ending July 26, 1958.

Prado's "Patricia" entered the UK Singles Chart in the week of July 25, 1958, peaking at No. 8 (week ending September 5, 1958) during a 16-week chart run.

In 1960, Prado released a new stereo recording of the tune, and re-recorded it a third time in a "twist" version issued in 1962 that re-charted in the U.S.

Perry Como's recording of "Patricia" from 1950 bears no resemblance to Prado's tune.

== Cover versions and other usages ==
- The song was featured in the Weebl and Bob flash cartoon.
- The song was covered by a Kenyan group, Kiko Kids, some time in the late 1950s.
- The song was featured in a TV advert for the UK post office.
- The song was featured at several points in Federico Fellini's 1960 film La Dolce Vita, including a segment at a party where the music accompanied a striptease.
- The song was featured as background music for a pool party in the 1969 film Goodbye, Columbus.
- The song was covered by Frank Valdor and His Orchestra and Chorus on the album 16 Fantastic Golden Latin Hits in 1978.
- The tune was sung by Homer Simpson as he was shaving before a romantic night out in the "Some Enchanted Evening" episode of The Simpsons' first season. The song was also played by a dance band later in that same episode.
- The song appears in the 1989 movie Great Balls of Fire! during the scene in which Jerry Lee Lewis drives his convertible and proposes marriage to his thirteen-year-old second cousin, Myra Gale.
- The Mambo All Stars’ version of the song was the theme for the 1999 animated series George and Martha.
- The song was used as the theme song to HBO's Real Sex series.
- The song was covered by Link Wray, Duane Eddy, and Rory Parker, and by Ry Cooder on his Grammy winning 2002 album, Mambo Sinuendo.
- The song was used as background music for the swimsuit competition at the 1997 Miss Universe Pageant.
- The song was used in "The British Invasion", Episode 12 from Season 2 of the Showtime series Dexter.
- The song was used as background music in the state financed Danish TV campaign "Fisk 2 gange om ugen".

== Charts ==
=== Weekly charts ===
Chart (1958)	Peak position
Australia (Kent Music Report)	1
Belgium (Ultratop 50 Flanders)	2
Belgium (Ultratop 50 Wallonia)	2
Canada (CHUM Hit Parade)	2
German Media Control Top100 Singles Chart	1
Netherlands (Single Top 100)	6
UK Singles (Official Charts)	8
US Top 100	1
US Billboard Hot 100	2
US Billboard Most Played by Jockeys	1
US Billboard Country & Western Best Sellers	14
US Billboard Rhythm & Blues Best Sellers	1
US Cash Box Top 100	1

== Certifications ==
Region	Certification	Certified units/sales
United States (RIAA)	Gold	1,000,000^{^}
^{^} Shipments figures based on certification alone.
