= The Elegants =

American doo-wop group

- Origin: South Beach, Staten Island, New York, U.S.
- Genres: Doo-wop
- Years active: 1958–2012
- Label: Apt
- Past members: Vito Picone; Arthur Venosa; Frank Tardogno; Carman Romano; James Moschello

The Elegants was an American doo-wop vocal group, that started in 1958 by Vito Picone, Arthur Venosa, Frank Tardogno, Carman Romano and James Moschello in South Beach, Staten Island, New York.

== Career ==
Before their nursery rhyme inspired song "Little Star" became a number one hit, the band usually performed informally under the boardwalk by their homes. "Little Star" was the only million seller for the group, and was written by Venosa and Picone. It spent 19 weeks in the Billboard Hot 100, earning gold disc status.

The song reached number 25 in the UK Singles Chart in September 1958.

After their success with "Little Star", the band, still in their teens, toured with artists such as Buddy Holly, Dion and the Belmonts, Chuck Berry and Jerry Lee Lewis. However, none of their subsequent singles reached the charts at all, making them an example of one-hit wonders.

In early 1970s, lead singer Vito Picone returned to the group, replacing Tardogno as the lead singer. The group could be seen annually performing at the San Gennaro Festival, in Little Italy, Manhattan, New York City.

According to the group's website, Freddie Redmond died of emphysema in 2006, and was replaced by original member, James Moschello. Moschello had performed with The Charts in the 1980s.

As of 2012, the Elegants were still performing at concerts and events throughout the United States, under the name "Vito Picone & The Elegants". Band members include Joe Lucenti on lead guitar (who played with future Kiss drummer Peter Criss in the band Sounds of Soul in the 1960s), Alex "Al Bal" Leonard and Mark Garni on keyboards, Mike Catalano and Pete Gamby on electric bass, with Vinny Cognato and Sal Albanese on drums.

Carman Romano (born August 17, 1938) died on August 2, 2016, at the age of 77. Artie Venosa died on April 20, 2018. James Moschello died in Staten Island, New York on February 2, 2026, at the age of 88.

== Notable singles ==
- "Little Star" (June 1958)
- "Please Believe Me" (October 1958)
- "Pay Day" (February 1959)
- "My Tears" (1960)
- "Little Boy Blue (Is Blue No More)" (January 1960)
- "Speak Low" (July 1960)
- "Happiness" (January 1961)
- "Tiny Cloud" (May 1961)
- "Dressin' Up" (November 1962)
- "A Letter From Viet Nam (Dear Donna)" (January 1965)
- "Bring Back Wendy" (April 1965)

== References in culture ==
- The title poem of American poet Mark Halliday's collection Little Star (W. Morrow, 1987) is an homage to The Elegants and Vito Picone. The poem is also available in Allen Grossman (with Mark Halliday), The Sighted Singer: Two Works on Poetry for Readers and Writers (Johns Hopkins UP, 1992), pages 25–27.

== See also ==
- List of artists who reached number one in the United States
- List of artists who reached number one on the Billboard R&B chart
- List of one-hit wonders in the United States
- List of doo-wop musicians
