= Pérez Prado =

Cuban bandleader and mambo musician (1916–1989)

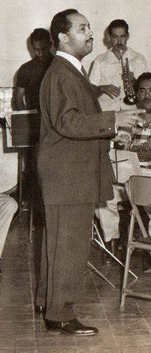
- Pérez Prado in 1954

Background information
- Also known as: "Prez" Prado; "The King of the Mambo"
- Born: Dámaso Pérez Prado; December 11, 1916; Matanzas, Cuba
- Died: September 14, 1989 (aged 72) Mexico City, Mexico
- Genre: Mambo
- Occupations: Musician; arranger; bandleader; composer
- Years active: 1933–1987
- Label: RCA Victor

Dámaso Pérez Prado (December 11, 1916 – September 14, 1989) (Note: His stage name was simply Pérez Prado (Latin American Spanish: [ˈpeɾes ˈpɾaðo]), although his brother Pantaleón also used the same name in the 1970s, which led to confusion.) was a Cuban bandleader, pianist, composer and arranger who popularized the mambo in the 1950s. His big band adaptation of the danzón-mambo proved to be a worldwide success with hits such as "Mambo No. 5", earning him the nickname "The King of the Mambo". In 1955, Pérez Prado and his orchestra topped the charts in the US and UK with a mambo cover of Louiguy's "Cherry Pink (and Apple Blossom White)". He frequently made brief appearances in films, primarily of the rumberas genre, and his music was featured in films such as La Dolce Vita.

Pérez Prado began his career as pianist and arranger for the Sonora Matancera, an internationally successful dance music ensemble from his hometown of Matanzas. He later established his own group and made several recordings in Havana in 1946, including "Trompetiana", a self-penned mambo and one of the first examples arranged for big band. He then moved to Mexico where he developed this particular genre in multiple forms, including bolero-mambo (with María Luisa Landín), guaracha-mambo (with Benny Moré) and two forms of instrumental mambo he created: mambo batiri and mambo kaen. The success of his 1949 recordings landed him a contract with RCA Victor in the US, which led to a prolific career during the 1950s. His number 1 hit "Cherry Pink (and Apple Blossom White)" was followed by other charting singles, such as a cover of "Guaglione" and his own "Patricia", both released in 1958. Pérez Prado's popularity in the US began to decline in the 1960s with the advent of other Latin dance rhythms such as pachanga and, later, boogaloo. Despite several innovative albums and a new form of mambo he called "dengue", Pérez Prado was never able to duplicate his earlier success and returned to Mexico in the 1970s, where he became a naturalized citizen in 1980. He died in Mexico City in 1989. His son, Pérez Prado Jr., continues to direct the Pérez Prado Orchestra in Mexico City to this day.

== Biography ==
=== Early life ===
Dámaso Pérez Prado was born in Matanzas, Cuba, on December 11, 1916; his mother Sara Prado was a school teacher, his father Pablo Pérez a journalist at El Heraldo de Cuba. He studied classical piano in his early childhood, and later played organ and piano in local clubs. For a time, he was pianist and arranger for the Sonora Matancera, Cuba's best-known musical group at the time. He also worked with casino orchestras in Havana for most of the 1940s. He was nicknamed "El Cara de Foca" ("Seal Face") by his peers at the time.

In 1949, Pérez Prado moved to Mexico where he formed his own band and signed a recording contract with the International division of RCA Victor in Mexico City. He quickly specialized in mambos, an upbeat adaptation of the Cuban danzón. Pérez Prado's mambos stood out among the competition, with their fiery brass riffs and strong saxophone counterpoints, and most of all, his trademark grunts (he actually says "¡Dilo!" ("Say it!") in many of the perceived grunts). In 1950, arranger Sonny Burke heard "Qué rico el mambo" while on vacation in Mexico and recorded it back in the United States. The single was a hit, which led Pérez Prado to launch a US tour. He was to record the song again some years later under the title "Mambo Jambo". Pérez Prado's appearances in 1951 were sell-outs. Producers Herman Diaz Jr. and Ethel Gabriel signed Pérez Prado to RCA Victor in the US and produced his best-selling recording of "Cherry Pink and Apple Blossom White.

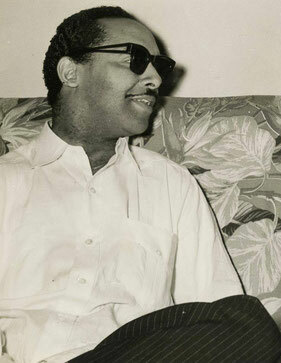
Perez Prado in 1954

Pérez Prado and his Orchestra performed at the famed tenth Cavalcade of Jazz concert held at Wrigley Field in Los Angeles which was produced by Leon Hefflin, Sr. on June 20, 1954.

=== Works ===
Pérez Prado composed "Mambo No. 5" (later a UK chart-topper for both Lou Bega in 1999 and animated character Bob the Builder in 2001) and "Mambo No. 8". The mambo craze peaked in the US in 1955, when he hit the American charts at number one with a cha-cha-chá version of "Cherry Pink (and Apple Blossom White)" (by French composer Louiguy). This arrangement, featuring trumpeter Billy Regis, held the spot for 10 consecutive weeks, sold over one million copies, and was awarded a gold disc. The song also went to number one in the UK and in Germany. Pérez Prado had first recorded this title for the movie Underwater! in 1954, where Jane Russell can be seen dancing to "Cherry Pink (and Apple Blossom White)". In 1958, one of Pérez Prado's own compositions, "Patricia", became the last record to ascend to No. 1 on the Jockeys and Top 100 charts, both of which gave way the following week to the then newly introduced Billboard Hot 100 chart, where in its first week had the song at No. 2 behind Ricky Nelson's "Poor Little Fool." The song also went to number one in Germany, and in the UK it reached number eight. The Italian filmmaker Federico Fellini chose to feature "Patricia" twice in his 1960 masterpiece, La Dolce Vita.

=== International popularity ===
Pérez Prado's popularity in the United States matched the peak of the first wave of interest in Latin music outside the Hispanic and Latino communities during the 1940s, 1950s and early 1960s. He also performed in films in the United States and Europe, as well as in Mexican cinema (Rumberas film), always with his trademark goatee and turtle-neck sweaters and vests.

In 1953, during the height of his popularity in Mexico, Pérez Prado was unexpectedly deported and was not permitted to return until 1964. A popular legend among Mexicans is that he was deported for having done a mambo arrangement of the Mexican National Anthem, which would have constituted a crime under Mexican law (Note: Chapter Five, Article 38 of the Law on the National Arms, Flag, and Anthem states that "It is strictly prohibited to alter the words or music of the National Anthem and to execute it totally or partially in compositions or arrangements. Likewise, it is prohibited to sing or play the National Anthem for purposes of commercial advertising or of a similar nature." (Translated from Spanish).). However, according to journalist Iván Restrepo, the actual reason for his exile was that a Mexican businessman who had hired him to work at the Margo theater in Mexico City became enraged when he decided to work with another businessman who paid him more. The first businessman reported him to the migration authorities as he lacked a work permit. Pérez Prado, who had just finished recording the soundtrack for the movie Cantando nace el amor, was then approached by two migration agents who asked him to show them his work permit; since he did not have the permit, he bribed the officers to let him finish recording the mambo Alekum Salem before being deported. His eleven-year exile came to an end after Mexican singer and actress María Victoria interceded with then-President Adolfo López Mateos to allow Pérez Prado back into Mexico.

By 1960, Pérez Prado's popularity in the United States began to wane, with the new decade giving way to new rhythms, such as rock and roll and changing trends in pop music. His association with RCA Victor ended in the mid 1960s, and afterward his recorded output was mainly limited to smaller labels with limited distribution mostly in Latin America and recycled Latin-style anthologies. After returning to Mexico, he had a final hit there with the self-penned danzón "Norma, la de Guadalajara", which topped the Mexican charts in 1968.

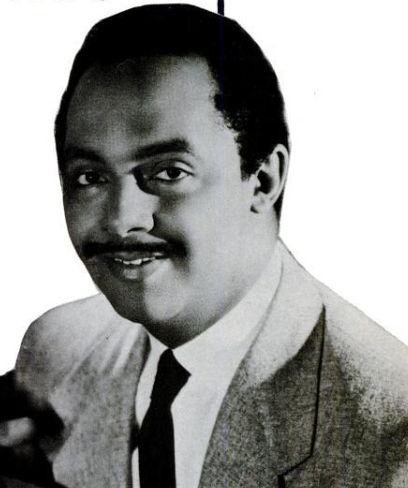
1968

=== Later life and death ===
In the early 1970s, Pérez Prado retired to a spacious apartment off Mexico City's grand Paseo de la Reforma with his wife and two children, son Dámaso Pérez Salinas (known as Pérez Prado Jr.) and daughter María Engracia. While his career in the US had declined, his popularity in Latin America was still strong. He continued to tour there and he performed regularly on Mexican radio and television. Pérez Prado continued to release recordings in Mexico, Central and South America, as well as Japan, where he was still revered as one of the reigning giants of the music industry. RCA issued a live recording made during his 1973 concert tour in Japan.

In 1981, Pérez Prado was featured in a musical revue entitled Sun, which enjoyed a long run in Mexico City. In 1983, his brother Pantaleón Pérez Prado, a musician who was also known professionally as Pérez Prado, died, and the press erroneously reported Dámaso's death.

On September 12, 1987, Pérez Prado made his final appearance in the US in Hollywood where he played to a packed house. Plagued by persistent ill health for the next two years, he died of complications from a stroke in Mexico City on September 14, 1989, at the age of 72.

== Legacy ==
Although he did not create the genre—Orestes López and his brother Cachao did in 1937—Pérez Prado has been recognized as a key figure in the refinement and popularization of mambo and Cuban dance music in general across the world in the 1950s. His success came from his adaptation of the fast mambo rhythm to the American-style big bands of the 1940s and away from the quieter Cuban charanga.

He also worked with a variety of musicians who would go on to have successful careers. In 1946, he worked with guaracha singer Orlando Guerra "Cascarita", who became one of the leading exponents of the genre. In Mexico, he helped launch the career of Beny Moré in 1949, with hits such as "Anabacoa". In the US, he worked with West Coast trumpeters such as Maynard Ferguson, Pete Candoli and Ollie Mitchell (featured on "Flight of the Bumble Bee"), trombonist-vocalist Ray Vasquez, and a variety of percussionists, including Armando Peraza, Mongo Santamaría and Alex Acuña.

In 1999, Pérez Prado was posthumously inducted into the International Latin Music Hall of Fame.

Perez is recognized on the Hollywood Walk of Fame.

== Discography ==
=== Singles ===
- "April in Portugal"
- "Ballin' The Jack"
- "Cherry Pink (and Apple Blossom White)"
- "Chicago Dengue"
- "La Chula Linda"
- "Claudia"
- "Concierto para Bongó"
- "Fantasia"
- "A Go Go Mambo"
- "Guaglione"
- "The High and Mighty"
- "Lupita"
- "Mambo No. 5"
- "Mambo No. 8"
- "Mambo a la Kenton"
- "Mambo del Politécnico"
- "Mambo del Ruletero"
- "Mambo en Sax"
- "Mambo del Taconazo"
- "Mambo en trompeta"
- "Mambo Universitario"
- "Marilyn Monroe Mambo"
- "La Niña Popoff"
- "Paris"
- "Patricia"
- "Que Rico el Mambo" (aka Mambo Jambo)
- "St. Louis Blues Mambo"
- "Tico, Tico, Tico"
- "Tomando Café"

=== Albums ===
All albums were issued by RCA Victor.

- Pérez Prado Plays Mucho Mambo For Dancing (1951)
- Voodoo Suite (1955)
- Mambo By The King (1955)
- Mambo Mania (1955)
- Havana 3 A.M. (1956)
- Latin Satin (1957)
- Cha Cha Cha (1958)
- Mambo Happy! (1958)
- Dilo (Ugh!) (1958)
- "Prez" (1958) (Pérez Prado's only US Top 40 album, reached No. 22 in May 1959)
- Pops and Prado (1959)
- A Touch of Tabasco with Rosemary Clooney (1959)
- Big Hits By Prado (1960)
- Perez Prado's Rockambo (1961)
- Latino! (1961)
- La Chunga (1961)
- Exotic Suite of the Americas (1962)
- Now! Twist Goes Latin (1962)
- Our Man In Latin America (1963)
- Dance Latino (1965)
- The Best Of Perez Prado (1967) (reissue of Big Hits By Prado)
- This Is Perez Prado (1971)
- Perez Prado - Pure Gold (1976) (another reissue of Big Hits By Prado)

== Filmography ==
- It's a Sin to Be Poor (1950)
- To the Sound of the Mambo (1950)
- Lost Love (1951)
- Serenade in Acapulco (1951)
- From the Can-Can to the Mambo (1951)
- Underwater! (1955)
- Cha-Cha-Cha Boom! (1956)
- Girls for the Mambo-Bar (1959)
