= Dinah Washington discography =

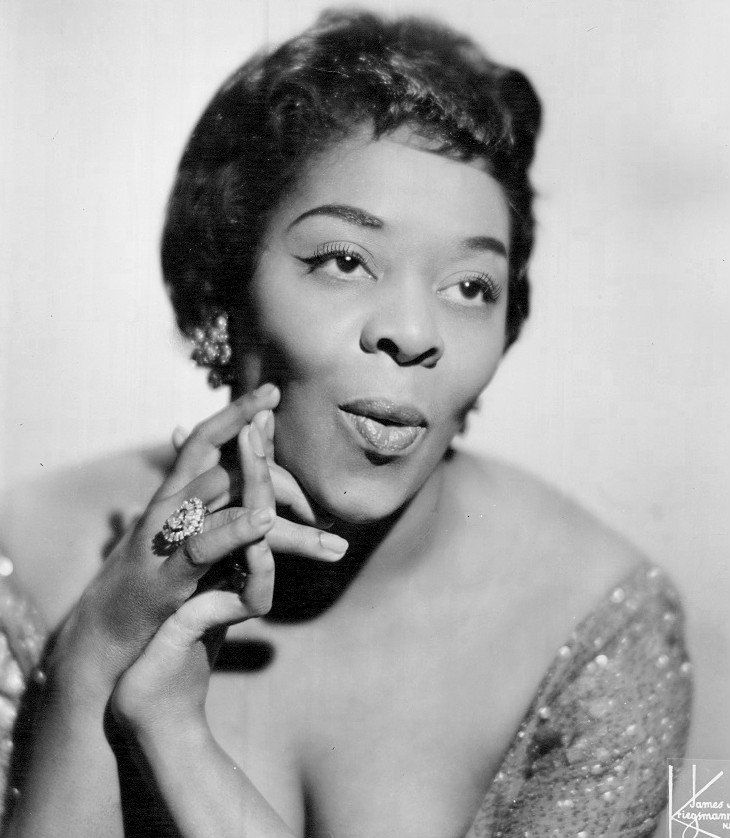
- Washington in 1962

This article presents the discography of the American jazz singer Dinah Washington (1924–1963).

== As leader ==
- 1947: Mellow Mama (Delmark, 1992) – compilation of Apollo recordings
- 1950: Dinah Washington (Mercury MG-25060) – compilation of previous 78s
- 1952: Dynamic Dinah! – The Great Voice of Dinah Washington – compilation of previous 78s
- 1952: Blazing Ballads (Mercury) – compilation
- 1954: After Hours with Miss "D" (EmArcy)
- 1954: Dinah Jams (EmArcy) – live
- 1955: For Those in Love (EmArcy)
- 1956: Dinah! (EmArcy)
- 1956: In the Land of Hi-Fi (EmArcy)
- 1957: Dinah Washington Sings the Best in Blues (Mercury) – compilation
- 1957: The Swingin' Miss "D" (EmArcy)
- 1957: Dinah Washington Sings Fats Waller (EmArcy)
- 1957: Music for a First Love (Mercury)
- 1958: Dinah Sings Bessie Smith (EmArcy)
- 1958: Newport '58 (EmArcy)
- 1959: The Queen
- 1959: What a Diff'rence a Day Makes! (Mercury)
- 1959: Unforgettable (Mercury)
- 1960: The Two of Us – with Brook Benton
- 1960: I Concentrate on You
- 1960: For Lonely Lovers
- 1961: September in the Rain (Mercury)
- 1962: Dinah '62
- 1962: In Love
- 1962: Drinking Again (Roulette)
- 1962: Tears and Laughter (Mercury)
- 1962: I Wanna Be Loved
- 1962: Late, Late Show
- 1963: Back to the Blues (Roulette)
- 1963: Dinah '63
- 1963: This Is My Story (Mercury) – compilation
- 1964: In Tribute
- 1964: The World of Dinah Washington (Roulette SR-25269) – compilation
- 1967: Dinah Discovered
- 1976: The Jazz Sides
- 2004: The Complete Dinah Washington on Mercury (PolyGram, 1987–1989)[7 × 3-CD] (Note: Though "1958–1960" sometimes appears in the title, it clearly contains only 1959 and 1960 recording sessions.)
- 2004: The Complete Roulette Dinah Washington Sessions (Mosaic)[5-CD]

== As sidewoman ==
With Clifford Brown

- Jam Session (EmArcy, 1954) – with Maynard Ferguson and Clark Terry; appears on one track

== Singles ==
Year	Song	Peak chart positions			
Year	Song	US BB	US CB	US R&B	UK
1944	"Salty Papa Blues"	—	—	10	—
1944	"Evil Gal Blues"	—	—	9	—
1946	"Blow-Top Blues"(with Lionel Hampton)	21	—	5	—
1948	"Ain't Misbehavin'"	—	—	6	—
1948	"West Side Baby"	—	—	7	—
1948	"Walkin' and Talkin' (and Crying My Blues Away)"	—	—	13	—
1948	"I Want to Cry"	—	—	11	—
1948	"Resolution Blues"	—	—	15	—
1948	"Am I Asking Too Much"	—	—	1	—
1948	"It's Too Soon to Know"	—	—	2	—
1949	"You Satisfy"	—	—	8	—
1949	"Baby Get Lost"	—	—	1	—
1949	"Good Daddy Blues"	—	—	9	—
1949	"Long John Blues"	—	—	3	—
1950	"I Only Know"	—	—	3	—
1950	"It Isn't Fair"	—	—	5	—
1950	"I Wanna Be Loved"	22	—	5	—
1950	"I'll Never Be Free"	—	—	3	—
1950	"Time Out for Tears"	—	—	6	—
1951	"Harbor Lights"	—	—	10	—
1951	"My Heart Cries for You"	—	—	7	—
1951	"I Won't Cry Anymore"	—	—	6	—
1951	"Cold, Cold Heart"	—	—	3	—
1952	"Wheel of Fortune"	—	—	3	—
1952	"Tell Me Why"	—	—	7	—
1952	"Trouble in Mind"	—	—	4	—
1952	"New Blowtop Blues"	—	—	5	—
1953	"TV Is the Thing (This Year)"	—	—	3	—
1953	"Fat Daddy"	—	—	10	—
1954	"I Don't Hurt Anymore"	—	—	3	—
1954	"Dream"	—	—	9	—
1954	"Teach Me Tonight"	23	—	4	—
1955	"I Concentrate on You"	—	—	11	—
1955	"I Diddle"	—	—	14	—
1955	"If It's the Last Thing I Do"	—	—	13	—
1955	"That's All I Want from You"	—	—	8	—
1955	"You Might Have Told Me"	—	—	14	—
1956	"I'm Lost Without You Tonight"	—	—	13	—
1956	"Soft Winds"	—	—	13	—
1958	"Make Me a Present of You"	—	—	27	—
1958	"Never Again"	—	74	—	—
1959	"What a Diff'rence a Day Makes"	8	4	4	—
1959	"Unforgettable"	17	8	15	—
1960	"Baby (You've Got What It Takes)" (with Brook Benton)	5	2	1	—
1960	"It Could Happen to You"	53	47	—	—
1960	"A Rockin' Good Way (to Mess Around and Fall in Love)" (with Brook Benton)	7	5	1	—
1960	"This Bitter Earth"	24	23	1	—
1960	"Love Walked In"	30	18	16	—
1960	"We Have Love"	76	51	—	—
1960	"Looking Back"	—	92	—	—
1961	"Early Every Morning"	95	75	—	—
1961	"Do You Want It That Way"	—	121	—	—
1961	"Our Love Is Here to Stay"	89	70	—	—
1961	"September in the Rain"	23*	19	5	35
1962	"Tears and Laughter"	71*	56	—	—
1962	"Dream" (new version of 1954 hit)	92	92	—	—
1962	"Such a Night"	—	109	—	—
1962	"I Want to Be Loved" (new version of 1950 hit)	76	109	—	—
1962	"Am I Blue"	—	110	—	—
1962	"Cold, Cold Heart" (new version of 1951 hit)	96	140	—	—
1962	"Where Are You?"	36*	38	—	—
1962	"You're Nobody till Somebody Loves You"	87	—	—	—
1962	"For All We Know"	88	tag	—	—
1962	"I Wouldn't Know (What to Do)"	93	112	—	—
1962	"You're a Sweetheart"	98	—	—	—
1963	"Soulville"	92	126	—	—
1964	"A Stranger on Earth"	—	136	—	—
1992	"Mad About the Boy"	—	—	—	41

- "September in the Rain", "Tears and Laughter", and "Where Are You" also made the AC charts (Nos. 5, 17, and 11 respectively)
