= This Is My Story =

Compilation album by Dinah Washington
- Released: April 1963
- Recorded: 1961
- Genre: Vocal jazz
- Label: Mercury Records MG 20788

Dinah Washington chronology
| Dinah '63 (1963) | This Is My Story (1963) | In Tribute (1964) |

Professional ratings
Review scores
| Source | Rating |
|---|---|
| Allmusic | 3/5 stars |

This Is My Story: Volume One is a final compilation album by American jazz singer Dinah Washington.

== Reception ==
A reviewer of Dusty Groove stated "A cool compilation that features one album of new recordings of older Dinah Washington hits—done in 1961 with backings by Quincy Jones—and another record that features some of Dinah's best bits for Mercury from the late 50s and early 60s!"

== Track listing ==
| No. | Title | Writer(s) | Length |
|---|---|---|---|
| 1. | "Salty Papa Blues" | Leonard Feather | 2:26 |
| 2. | "Mixed Emotions" | Stuart Lochheim | 2:51 |
| 3. | "Time out for Tears" | Abe Schiff, Irving Berman | 2:54 |
| 4. | "I Wanna Be Loved" | Billy Rose, Edward Heyman, Johnny Green | 2:40 |
| 5. | "Trust in Me" | Ned Wever, Milton Ager, Jean Schwartz | 2:59 |
| 6. | "Mad About the Boy" | Noël Coward | 2:45 |
| 7. | "September in the Rain" | Al Dubin, Harry Warren | 2:05 |
| 8. | "This Bitter Earth" | Clyde Otis | 2:25 |
| 9. | "Such a Night" | Lincoln Chase | 2:25 |
| 10. | "If I Loved You" | Oscar Hammerstein II, Richard Rodgers | 2:23 |
| 11. | "Harbor Lights" | Hugh Williams, Jimmy Kennedy | 2:30 |
| 12. | "What a Diff'rence a Day Made" | María Grever, Stanley Adams | 2:35 |
