= Because of Rain =

Single by Nat King Cole

Single by Nat "King" Cole
- A-side: "Song of Delilah" "Because of Rain"
- Released: 1951
- Label: Capitol
- Songwriters: Ruth Poll; Nat Cole; Bill Harrington

Nat "King" Cole singles chronology
"Red Sails in the Sunset" (1951)	"Because of Rain" (1951)	"Unforgettable" (1952)

Audio
- "Because of Rain" on YouTube

"Because of Rain"

Single by Ella Fitzgerald
- B-side: "The Chesapeake and Ohio"
- Released: 1951
- Label: Decca
- Songwriters: Ruth Poll; Nat Cole; Bill Harrington

Audio
- "Because of Rain" on YouTube

"Because of Rain" is a song that was a minor hit for Nat "King" Cole in 1951.

== Writing and composition ==
The song was written by Nat "King" Cole's old friend Ruth Poll. Cole is credited as a composer.

== Releases and critical reception ==
=== Nat "King" Cole version ===
Nat "King" Cole version
Review scores
Source	Rating
Jazz Hot	no rating

Nat "King" Cole recorded his version for Capitol with Les Baxter and his orchestra. For a single release, it was coupled with "Song of Delilah" (inspired by Cecil B. DeMille's film Samson and Delilah).

The French Jazz Hot magazine viewed both sides negatively, writing: "We regret that Nat indulges in such displays that have only a distant connection to jazz." Nevertheless, the magazine noted that "King Cole will always be King Cole" and concluded: "Those who love King Cole's voice—and they are legion—will acquire this record solely for their idol."

=== Ella Fitzgerald version ===
Ella Fitzgerald version
Review scores
Source	Rating
Billboard	82/100
Cash Box	favorable

Ella Fitzgerald recorded her version for Decca with Sy Oliver and his orchestra.

Billboard reviewed her single (Decca 27602, coupled with "The Chesapeake and Ohio") on 26 May 1951, rating the side 85 ("excellent") on a scale of 1 to 100 for disk jockeys and 82 ("excellent") overall and writing: "Ella delivers a beautifully sensitive reading of an attractive new ballad. A wonderfully warm and intimate job which is bound to find buyers."

Cash Box reviewed the single as well, writing of "Because of Rain": "Ella shows up her most commercial side in years [...] Ella brings her unique phrasing to this ballad and highlights everything that's in it."

== Charts ==
Chart (1951)	Peak position
US Billboard Most Played Juke Box Records	17
