= Ruth Poll =

American lyricist, music publishing executive, dramatist and author

Ruth Poll (born Ruth M. Heiman, June 10, 1899 – March 14, 1955) was an American lyricist, music publishing executive, dramatist and author, best known for songs recorded by Nat King Cole, Tony Bennett Ella Fitzgerald, Billy Eckstine, and Eddie Fisher, such as "Those Things Money Can't Buy", "I'd Love to Make Love to You", "(I Need) A New Shade of Blues", "Because of Rain" and "Bring Back the Thrill".

== Early life and career ==
A lifelong Manhattanite (and 1st-generation German-American), Poll was the first of two children born to Dr. Henry Heiman and Bertha Tannenbaum.

In 1939, Poll and artist Gar Gilbert collaborated on a children's book, The American Holiday Parade, published by New York's Elektra Press, providing a series of brief, brightly illustrated verses on every nationally observed holiday of note.

Poll's first publicized foray into songwriting was her 1941 collaboration with composer Henry Sylvern, "I'm a Military Man Now," which was unveiled, at Treasury Secretary Henry Morgenthau's request, on the premiere broadcast of a revamped version of the U.S. Treasury's wartime radio series, The Treasury Hour—Millions for Defense.

In September 1942, an Americanized version of Ivor Novello's play, On the House, was presented in Scarsdale, New York, with the adaptation credited to Ruth Poll. The following June, the New York Daily News reported that Poll and composer Bob Emmerich were providing "extra songs" for an upcoming musical revue entitled Bright Lights, to be produced by Alexander H. Cohen. In the end, however, Cohen passed on their contribution, hiring the team of Jerry Livingston and Mack David instead.

Aside from Emmerich, it appears that Poll's most frequent collaborators were Claude Demetrius and Al Goodhart. Others include Mercer Ellington, Alec Wilder, Charles Brown, Pete Rugolo and Larry Stock.

In February 1949, Billboard reported that Poll had formed Maypole Music. By October, due in large part to the great success of her song "(I Need) A New Shade of Blues" (recorded that year by Ella Fitzgerald, Billy Eckstine, Ray Anthony and Mindy Carson), Poll had been admitted to ASCAP.

== Personal life and death ==
Ruth Poll was married to Dr. Daniel Poll from September 8, 1920, until his death on December 24, 1952. They had two daughters, both of whom predeceased their parents.

In her 1972 book, Nat King Cole, an Intimate Biography, Cole's widow Maria Cole recalls the wedding gift received from Poll on Easter Sunday, March 1948:

Ruth Poll, a very good friend of ours, gave me an exquisitely beautiful handkerchief that had been part of her daughter's trousseau at her own wedding, with all of the bridesmaids' names on it. I've kept it to give to my daughters.

Moreover, Poll herself, during roughly that same period (i.e. 1947 through 1949), hosted at least three interracial parties honoring African-American recording artists, two of them dedicated to singer Billy Eckstine. The latter of those two, held in May 1949, numbered among its musical "Who's Who" of guests Duke Ellington, Nat King Cole, and disc jockey Fred Robbins, while the former reportedly featured Cole playing piano behind both Eckstine and Mel Torme. By contrast, an earlier such Poll-sponsored event, honoring singer Nellie Lutcher in November 1947, appears to have been considerably less successful, receiving a scant one sentence of press coverage, informing readers that the putative guest of honor had failed to attend.

She and her husband had had two daughters. On Monday afternoon, March 14, 1955, Poll, at age 55 died following a heart attack.

== Songs ==
1941:

- "Weary Little Fellow" (written with Henry Sylvern)
- "I'm a Military Man Now" (written with Henry Sylvern)

1947:

- "I Owe This Dream to You" (Mercer Ellington)
- "Ain't Nobody's Business What I Do" (written with Claude Demetrius)
- "Two Poor Fools" (with Claude Demetrius)
- "I Don't Wanna Love You" (written with Demetrius and Johnny Farrow)
- "Those Things Money Can't Buy" (written with Al Goodhart)
- "I'd Love to Make Love to You" (written with Bob Emmerich)

1948:

- "If and When" (written with Bob Emmerich)
- "I Found a New Love Song" (written with Bob Emmerich)
- "Another November" (written with Johnny Farrow)
- "I Dreamed This Waltz" (written with Enzo Vollero)
- "If I Could Do What I'd Like to Do" (written with Claude Demetrius)
- "Let's Pretend" (written with Claude Demetrius)
- "I'm Looking for a Bluebird" (written with Bob Emmerich)
- "If Yesterday Could Only Be Tomorrow" (written with Bob Emmerich)
- "The Look In Your Eyes" (written with Bob Emmerich)
- "There's a Little White Gate" (written with Bob Emmerich)
- "Twenty-Four Hours a Day" (written with Bob Emmerich)
- "Someone Stole My Heart Away" (written with Carroll W. Lucas)
- "I'm Lookin' for Love" (written with Charles Brown)

1949:

- "I Love You, I Told You So" (written with Doris B. Halpern)
- "I'm Just Thinking Out Loud" (written with Bob Emmerich)
- "What Have You Got If You Haven't Got Love" (written with Alvin S. Kaufman and Bob Emmerich)

1950:

- "Bring Back the Thrill" (written with Pete Rugolo)
- "What Have You Got If You Haven't Got Love" (written with David Saxon)
- "The World Belongs to Me" (written with David Saxon)

1951:

- "Ain't Had No Lovin'" (written with Robert Marcus)
- "Hi-Ho for Holiday Land" (written with Bob Emmerich)
- "How Could You Be So Dumb, My Little Darlin'" (with Larry Stock)
- "What Have You Got If You Haven't Got Love" (written with Russ Black)
- "You Learned a Lot About Love" (written with Robert Marcus)
- "You Weren't There" (written with Alec Wilder)

1954:

- "Love, Tears and Kisses" (written with Al Goodhart and Alex Alstone)
- "Slow Down, Baby, Slow Down" (written with Sylvia Davis and Al Goodhart)

== Notable performers of her songs ==
Except where otherwise indicated, credits derived from Discogs.

- "Because of Rain" (Luis Alcaraz, Nat King Cole, Ella Fitzgerald, Earl Grant, Clyde McCoy)
- "Bring Back the Thrill" (Don Cherry, Tony Fontane, Eddie Fisher, Billy Eckstine, Doris Day, Mary Mayo)
- "Corner to Corner" (Sarah Vaughan)
- "I Owe This Dream to You" (Billy Daniels, with Mercer Ellington)
- "I'd Love to Make Love to You" (Johnny Moore's Three Blazers, Erskine Hawkins Dakota Staton with George Shearing)
- "If Yesterday Could Only Be Tomorrow" (Tony Bennett, Dayna Kurtz, Nat King Cole)
- "It Was So Good While It Lasted" (Helen Forrest, Nat King Cole)
- "Love, Tears and Kisses" (June Valli, David Whitfield with Mantovani)
- "A New Shade of Blues" (Billy Eckstine, Ella Fitzgerald, Ray Anthony, Mindy Carson, Johnny Moore's Three Blazers, Cynthia Crane)
- "Those Things Money Can't Buy" (Nat King Cole, Buddy Clark with Ray Noble, Marcy Lutes with Ray McKinley, Guy Cherney, Betty Rhodes with Charles Dant)
- "What Have You Got If You Haven't Got Love?" (Eartha Kitt)
- "You Weren't There" (Nat King Cole)
