= Dinah Sings Bessie Smith =

Studio album by Dinah Washington
- Released: 1958
- Recorded: December 30, 1957 and January 20, 1958
- Genre: Blues, pop standards
- Length: 35:23 (original recording)
- Label: Emarcy, Verve (reissue)
- Producer: Bob Shad

Dinah Washington chronology
Music for a First Love (1957)	Dinah Sings Bessie Smith (1958)	Newport '58 (1958)

Professional ratings
Review scores
Source	Rating
AllMusic	3/5 stars
The Penguin Guide to Jazz Recordings	3/4 stars

Dinah Sings Bessie Smith is the ninth studio album by blues, R&B and jazz singer Dinah Washington released on the Emarcy label, and reissued by Verve Records in 1999 as The Bessie Smith Songbook. The album arrangements are headed by Robare Edmondson and Ernie Wilkins, and the songs are associated with American blues singer Bessie Smith. AllMusic details the album in its review as saying: "It was only natural that the "Queen of the Blues" should record songs associated with the "Empress of the Blues." The performances by the septet/octet do not sound like the 1920s and the purposely ricky-tick drumming is insulting, but Dinah Washington sounds quite at home on this music".

== Track listing ==
1. "After You've Gone" (Turner Layton, Henry Creamer) – 3:39
2. "Send Me to the 'Lectric Chair" (George Brooks, Fletcher Henderson) – 3:17
3. "Jailhouse Blues" (Bessie Smith, Clarence Williams) – 3:12
4. "Trombone Butter" (Fletcher Henderson) – 3:31
5. "You've Been a Good Old Wagon" (Perry Bradford) – 4:02
6. "Careless Love" (W.C.Handy, Martha Koenig, Spencer Williams) – 3:37
7. "Backwater Blues" (Bessie Smith) – 5:00
8. "If I Could Be with You (One Hour Tonight)" (James P. Johnson, Henry Creamer) – 2:49
9. "Me and My Gin" (Harry Burke) - 3:11
10. "Fine Fat Daddy" (Dinah Washington) - 3:05

Additional tracks on 1999 CD reissue

11. "Trombone Butter (Alternative Take)" (Fletcher Henderson) – 3:38
12. "Careless Love" (Master Take In Mono) (W.C.Handy, Martha Koenig, Spencer Williams) – 4:01
13. "Send Me to the 'Lectric Chair" (Live Newport '58) (George Brooks, Fletcher Henderson) – 3:53
14. "Me and My Gin" (Live Newport '58) (Harry Burke) - 3:20
15. "Backwater Blues" (Live Newport '58) (Bessie Smith) – 4:37

"Trombone Butter" is a remake of "Trombone Cholly" with Quentin "Butter" Jackson playing Charlie Green's trombone part.

== Personnel ==
- Dinah Washington – lead vocals
- Blue Mitchell – trumpet
- Fortunatus "Fip" Ricard – trumpet
- Clark Terry – trumpet
- Quentin Jackson – trombone
- Melba Liston – trombone
- Julian Priester – trombone
- Eddie Chamblee – sax (tenor)
- Charles Davis – sax (baritone)
- McKinley Easton – sax (baritone)
- Harold Ousley – sax (baritone)
- Sahib Shihab – sax (baritone)
- James Craig – piano
- Wynton Kelly – piano
- Jack Wilson – piano
- Robert Edmondson – bass guitar
- Paul West – bass guitar
- Robert Lee Wilson – bass guitar
- Max Roach – drums
- James Slaughter – drums
- The Newport All Stars
- Robare Edmondson – arranger
- Ernie Wilkins – arranger
- Bob Shad – producer
- Dennis Drake – digital remastering
