= I Apologize (1931 song) =

1931 song by Al Hoffman, Al Goodhart and Ed Nelson

Song
- Published: 1931
- Songwriters: Al Hoffman, Al Goodhart, and Ed Nelson

"I Apologize" is a popular song written by Al Hoffman, Al Goodhart, and Ed Nelson.

== First recordings ==
The song was published in 1931. Recordings by Bing Crosby and Nat Shilkret were very successful in that year.

== Billy Eckstine ==
Perhaps the best-known version of the song was recorded by Billy Eckstine. This recording was released by MGM Records (catalog number 10903). It first reached the Billboard Best Seller chart on February 23, 1951, and lasted for 19 weeks on the chart, peaking at No. 8. It was awarded the Grammy Hall of Fame Award in 1999.

== Other recordings ==
- Tony Martin and Champ Butler enjoyed chart success with the song in 1951.
- Dinah Washington recorded the song in 1952 for her album Blazing Ballads
- Timi Yuro recorded the song for Liberty Records. It reached No. 72 on the US Charts in 1961.
- Aretha Franklin recorded the song for her album The Tender, the Moving, the Swinging Aretha Franklin (1962).
- A recording by P. J. Proby reached number 11 in the UK Singles Chart in 1965.
- Matt Monro's version is included in the album Matt Uncovered - The Rarer Monro.

== Popular culture ==
- Actor James Caan featured the song in the 1991 film, For the Boys.
