= September in the Rain (album) =

September In The Rain

Studio album by Dinah Washington
- Released: 1960
- Genre: Jazz, R&B
- Length: 26:33
- Label: Mercury Records

Dinah Washington chronology
What a Diff'rence a Day Makes! (1959)	September In The Rain (1960)	Unforgettable (1961)

Professional ratings
Review scores
Source	Rating
New Record Mirror	4/5 stars

September in the Rain is the eleventh studio album LP record by R&B and jazz singer Dinah Washington, released on the Mercury Records label.

== Chart performance ==
The album debuted on Billboard magazine's Top LP's chart in the issue dated December 24, 1961, peaking at No. 56 during a fifteen-week run on the chart. The album debuted on Cashbox magazine's Top Stereo Albums chart in the issue dated December 16, 1961, peaking at No. 43 during a five-week run on the chart.

The title track was released as a single (b/w "Wake the Town and Tell the People"), reaching No. 23 on the Billboard Hot 100 chart and No. 5 on the Hot R&B chart.

== Track listing ==
1. "September in the Rain" (Harry Warren, Al Dubin)
2. "Without a Song" (Vincent Youmans, Billy Rose, Edward Eliscu)
3. "This Heart of Mine" (Harry Warren, Arthur Freed)
4. "As Long as I'm in Your Arms" (Clyde Otis, Vin Corso)
5. "With a Song in My Heart" (Richard Rodgers, Lorenz Hart)
6. "Softly" (Joe Greene, Eddie Beal)
7. "I Can't Believe That You're in Love with Me" (Jimmy McHugh, Clarence Gaskill)
8. "I Was Telling Him About You" (Moose Charlap, Don George)
9. "I've Got My Love to Keep Me Warm" (Irving Berlin)
10. "I'll Never Kiss You Goodbye" (Clyde Otis)
11. "I'll Come Back for More" (Oramay Diamond, Bee Walker, Belford Hendricks)
12. "Tell Love Hello" (Damita Jo)

== Charts ==
Chart (1962)	Peak position
US Billboard Top LPs (Monoraul)	56
US Cashbox Top Albums (Stereo)	43
