= Mixed Emotions (1951 song) =

Single by Rosemary Clooney
- B-side: "Kentucky Waltz"
- Released: September 1951
- Genre: Pop music
- Length: 3:08
- Label: Columbia 39333
- Songwriter: Stuart Louchheim

Rosemary Clooney singles chronology
"Find Me" (1951)	"Mixed Emotions" (1951)	"Be My Life's Companion" (1951)

"Mixed Emotions" is a popular song by Stuart F. Louchheim, published in 1951.

The best-known version of the song was recorded by Rosemary Clooney on Columbia Records in 1951. It reached number 22 in the United States.

== Other recorded versions ==
- The song was covered by Ella Fitzgerald, as one side of a single whose other side was also a cover of a Rosemary Clooney hit, "Come On-a My House," on Decca Records (catalog number 27680).
- An instrumental version was created by Earl Grant on his album, Yes Sirree!
- Dinah Washington recorded the song twice, once in the early 1950s, and was included on her, Blazing Ballads album and again in 1961 on her This Is My Story album.
- Anita Bryant released a version of the song that was the B-side to her 1960 hit "Paper Roses".
