= Tears and Laughter =

Tears and Laughter may refer to:

- Tears and Laughter (Johnny Mathis album), a 1980 compilation album by Johnny Mathis
- Tears and Laughter (Dinah Washington album), a 1962 studio album by Dinah Washington
