= Dinah '63 =

Studio album by Dinah Washington
- Released: 1963
- Genre: Vocal jazz; traditional pop
- Length: 34:10
- Label: Roulette
- Producer: Henry Glover

Dinah Washington chronology
Back to the Blues (1963)	Dinah '63 (1963)	The Good Old Days (1963)

Dinah '63 is a studio album by American singer Dinah Washington, released in 1963 by Roulette Records. It was produced by Henry Glover and arranged by Fred Norman.

== Critical reception ==
Professional ratings
Review scores
Source	Rating
AllMusic	2/5 stars
The Encyclopedia of Popular Music	3/5 stars 2/5 stars
MusicHound Jazz: The Essential Album Guide	2.5/5 stars
The Rolling Stone Jazz & Blues Album Guide	3/5 stars

Scott Yanow from AllMusic wrote that Washington's pre-planned emotions and exaggerated manners tire the listener very quickly. John Koetzner of MusicHound Jazz: The Essential Album Guide placed the album in the "Should Be Avoided" section, noting that the return to pop material that Washington has performed in recent years is especially pale this time.

== Track listing ==
1. "I Wanna Be Around" (Johnny Mercer, Sadie Vimmerstadt) – 3:40
2. "Make Someone Happy" (Betty Comden, Adolph Green, Jule Styne) – 3:13
3. "Rags to Riches" (Richard Adler, Jerry Ross) – 2:47
4. "Take Me in Your Arms" (Markus Cuff, Mitchell Parish, Fritz Rotter) – 2:16
5. "Drown in My Own Tears" (Henry Glover) – 2:36
6. "Why I Was Born" (Oscar Hammerstein II, Jerome Kern) – 2:41
7. "I Left My Heart in San Francisco" (George Cory, Douglass Cross) – 2:09
8. "The Show Must Go On" (Roy Alfred, Al Frisch) – 2:47
9. "I'm Glad for Your Sake" (Jack Lawrence, Peter Tinturin) – 2:51
10. "There Must Be a Way" (Sammy Gallop) – 4:07
11. "What Kind of Fool Am I?" (Leslie Bricusse, Anthony Newley) – 2:05
12. "Bill" (Oscar Hammerstein II, Jerome Kern, P. G. Wodehouse) – 2:58

== Personnel ==
- Dinah Washington – vocals
- Fred Norman – arrangement, conducting
- Henry Glover – production
