= Chuck Higgins =

American saxophonist (1924–1999)

- Born: Charles Williams Higgins; April 17, 1924; Gary, Indiana
- Origin: Los Angeles, California
- Died: September 14, 1999 (aged 75) Los Angeles, California
- Genres: Rhythm and blues, jazz
- Instrument: Saxophone

Charles Williams Higgins (April 17, 1924 – September 14, 1999) was an American saxophonist.

Higgins relocated from his birthplace of Gary, Indiana to Los Angeles in his teens, where he played trumpet and went to school at the Los Angeles Conservatory of Music. Later switching to saxophone, he penned the single "Pachuko Hop" (1952), which became popular among American Latinos on the West Coast. The "Pachuko Hop" single's B-side, "Motorhead Baby", was the inspiration for the nickname of musician Motorhead Sherwood, who played with Frank Zappa. The song "Pachuko Hop" is also referenced in the lyrics to the songs "Jelly Roll Gum Drop" on Zappa's album Cruising with Ruben & the Jets (1968) and "Debra Kadabra" by Frank Zappa and Captain Beefheart on their collaborative album Bongo Fury (1975). Zappa listed Chuck Higgins as a reference in his influence list accompanying his album Freak Out! (1966). The 1955 single, "Wetback Hop", became the subject of controversy because of the use of the derogatory term for Mexicans in the title. It was an attempt to associate the listener with the earlier success of "Pachuko Hop", which refers to Mexican zoot suiters of the 1940s. The song appears on the 1996 Rocket Sixty-Nine release Jump Shot!.

Higgin's Orchestra performed at the famed twelfth Cavalcade of Jazz held at Wrigley Field in Los Angeles which was produced by Leon Hefflin, Sr. on September 2, 1956. Also performing that day were Dinah Washington, The Mel Williams Dots, Julie Stevens, Little Richard, Bo Rhambo, Willie Hayden & Five Black Birds, The Premiers, Gerald Wilson and His 20-Pc. Recording Orchestra and Jerry Gray and his Orchestra.

Higgins also played as a sideman with Charlie Parker and The Orioles, among others, and Johnny "Guitar" Watson played in Higgins's band for a short time. He recorded for Aladdin Records, Caddy Records, Lucky Records, Specialty Records, and Dootone Records, achieving regional success into the 1960s. In the middle of the 1960s he left active performance to become a teacher, though in the 1970s he recorded a few songs in the disco style. Later that decade and into the 1980s he returned to 1950s-style R&B, touring California clubs as well as England. Some of Higgins's back catalogue was released on reissue labels in the 1990s and 2000s.

Higgins died of lung cancer in 1999 in Los Angeles, California.
