= Back to the Blues =

Back to the Blues may refer to:

- Back to the Blues (Gary Moore album), 2001
- Back to the Blues (Dinah Washington album), 1963
