= Harry E. Burke =

American forest entomologist (1878–1963)

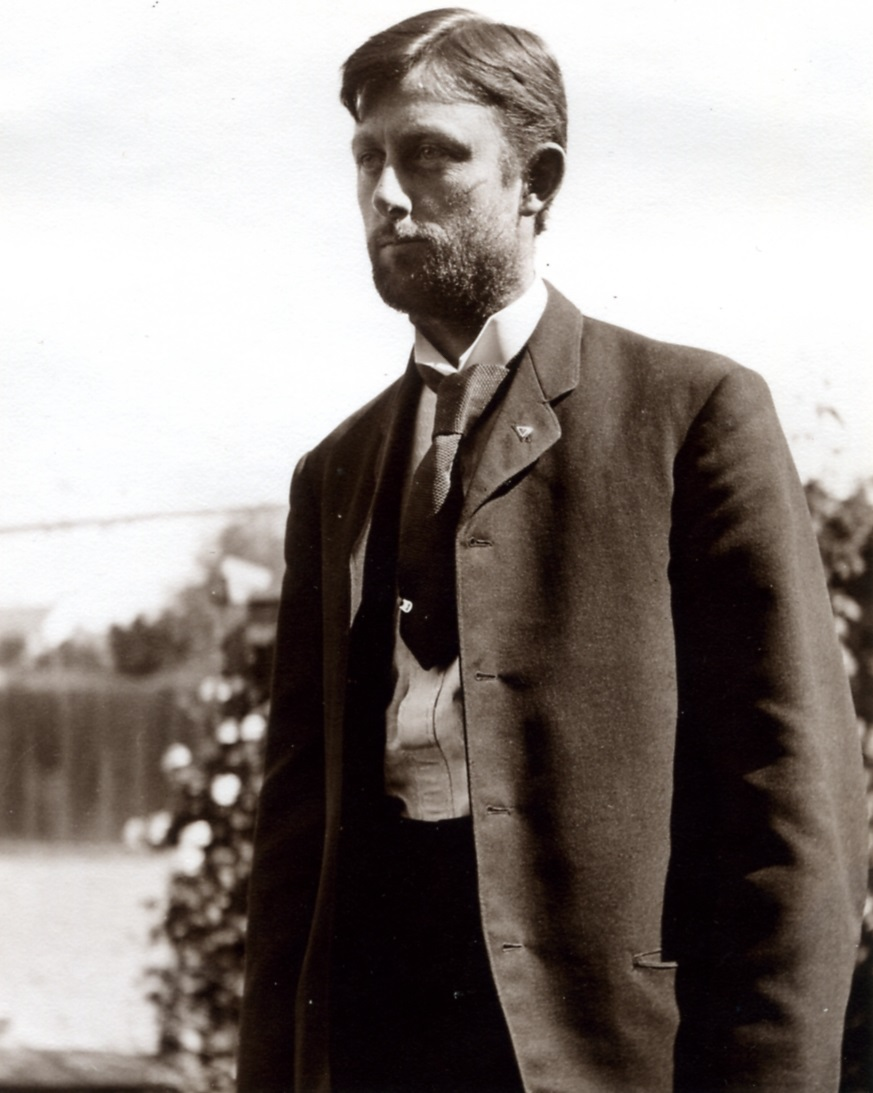
Burke in 1906

Harry Eugene Burke (May 19, 1878 – March 26, 1963) was an American entomologist. He was an authority on the Buprestidae (metallic wood-boring beetles) and other wood-boring beetles and forest pests of the western United States. He was the first forest entomologist to be hired and assigned to study insects on the west coast, and the first entomology graduate of Washington State University.

Burke was born in Paradise Valley, Nevada on May 19, 1878. Shortly after his birth, a raid by Paiute Indians compelled his parents to move to California. In 1881, they moved again to the state of Washington. He earned a B.S. in 1902, and M.S. in 1908 at Washington Agricultural College and School of Science (now Washington State University). He earned a PhD from Stanford University in 1923.

In 1902, Burke joined the USDA Bureau of Entomology where he began as an assistant to the forest entomologist A. D. Hopkins. During his 30-year career with the federal government, he focused his work on injurious forest insects including the tussock moth, Western pine beetle, Pacific flatheaded borer, and many insect pests. He was also a specialist on shade-tree insects and for many years worked on insect issues in the national parks of the American West.

Burke retired in 1934 and settled in Los Gatos, California. In retirement, he continued to advise on insect problems in the national parks. He also wrote magazine articles on shade-tree insects. Burke died on March 26, 1963.

== Writing ==
He published over 60 articles, and co-wrote the textbook Forest Insects with R. W. Doane, E. C. Van Dyke, and W. J. Chamberlin.
