= Wake the Town and Tell the People =

Song
- Published: 1955
- Composer: Jerry Livingston
- Lyricist: Sammy Gallop

"Wake the Town and Tell the People" is a popular song with music by Jerry Livingston and lyrics by Sammy Gallop, published in 1955. This song is a wedding day number complete with the chorus imitating the sound of wedding bells, as well as the sounds of the real chimes.

The biggest-selling recordings were made by Les Baxter and Mindy Carson, both released in 1955.

== Recorded versions ==
- Les Baxter (released by Capitol Records in the United States as catalog number 3120 and in Australia as catalog number CP-422, both with the flip side "I'll Never Stop Loving You").
- Rose Brennan (released 1955 by His Master's Voice as catalog numbers POP-112 (78 rpm) and 7M328 (45 rpm), both with the flip side "Ten Little Kisses").
- Pablo Beltrán Ruiz (released by RCA Victor Records as catalog number 20-6341, with the flip side "Love Is a Many-Splendored Thing").
- Jimmy Carroll's Orchestra with the Bell Ringers (released by Bell Records as catalog number 1105, with the flip side "The Yellow Rose of Texas").
- Mindy Carson (released by Columbia Records as catalog number 40537, with the flip side "Hold Me Tight"; re-recorded and released in 1960 by Joy Records (New York) as catalog number 236, with the flip side "When I Fall in Love").
- Bing Crosby recorded the song in 1955 for use on his radio show and it was subsequently included in the box set The Bing Crosby CBS Radio Recordings (1954-56) issued by Mosaic Records (catalog MD7-245) in 2009.
- Bethe Douglas (released September 1955 by Pye Records as catalog number N15007, with the flip side "How to Be Very, Very Popular").
- Four-in-a-Chord (released November 1955 by Embassy Records as catalog number WB158, with the flip side "Twenty Tiny Fingers").
- Joe Loss Orchestra (released 1955 by His Master's Voice as catalog numbers POP-118 (78 rpm) and 7M330 (45 rpm), both with the flip side "Button Up Your Overcoat").
- Lorrae Desmond released September 1955 by Decca Records in the United Kingdom as catalog number F 10612 with the flip side "You Should Know"
- Dinah Washington (released by Mercury Records in the United States as catalog number 71876 and in Australia as catalog number 45434, both with the flip side "September in the Rain").
- Lawrence Welk (released 1955 in the United States by Coral Records as catalog number 61477 and in the United Kingdom by Vogue-Coral Records as catalog number 72102, both with the flip side "I Hear Those Bells").
- Erni Bieler had a German hit at #11 with the rendering "Lass die Welt darüber reden" in 1956: this version has also been recorded by Liane Augustin and Lolita.
- Ivo Robić recorded the song for inclusion on a 1957 four track EP single.
