= I Understand (1941 song) =

Song by Mabel Wayne and James Kimball "Kim" Gannon

"I Understand" is a popular song with music by Mabel Wayne and lyrics by James Kimball "Kim" Gannon. It was published in 1941.

It has been recorded by:

- Jimmy Dorsey and His Orchestra (vocal by Bob Eberly). This reached the No. 11 position in the Billboard charts in 1941.
- Fats Waller - recorded May 13, 1941 for Bluebird records (catalog No. 11175A).
- Harry James and His Orchestra (vocal by Buddy DiVito), recorded November 6, 1947 for Columbia Records (catalog No. 38059).
- The Four Aces - recorded for Decca Records (catalog No. 28162) (1952).
- Keely Smith - I Wish You Love (1957)
- Nat "King" Cole - in his album Just One of Those Things (1957)
- Kenny Dorham - This Is the Moment! (1958)
- The Four Freshmen - The Four Freshmen and Five Guitars (1959)
- Dinah Washington - Unforgettable (1959)
- The Ink Spots - Best of the Ink Spots (1979).
- Dave Brubeck - Just You, Just Me (1994)
