= Clyde Reasinger =

American jazz musician

Clyde Reasinger (né Clyde Melvin Reasinger; 1927 – March 26, 2018) was an American trumpeter known for his work in big bands and recording studios.

Reasinger was born in Pennsylvania, and began his musical career in the late 1940s. He later led his own big bands in recording studios, live venues, and reading/rehearsal bands.

== Recording sessions ==
Reasinger has jazz recording credits exceed 63 sessions with bands and artists that include:

Jazz recording sessions

- Earle Spencer (1949)
- Dinah Washington with Ike Carpenter's Orchestra (1951)
- Stan Kenton (1952, 1967)
- Shorty Rogers: Shorty Rogers Courts the Count (RCA Victor, 1954)
- Sam Donahue (1955, 1957, 1958)
- Tommy Alexander (1956)
- Billy VerPlanck (1957)
- Dan Terry (1958)
- Maynard Ferguson: A Message from Newport (Roulette, 1958)
- Gil Evans (1958)
- Johnny Richards (1958, 1959)
- Boris Lindqvist, with the Bengt Arne Wallin Orchestra (1960)
- Quincy Jones (1960)
- Oliver Nelson (1961)
- Jackie Paris (1962)
- Henry Jerome and the Brazen Brass (1960)
- Joe Williams (1964, 1965)
- Dan Terry (mid 1960s)
- Ray Starling (1966)
- The New Glenn Miller Orchestra (1966)
- Charlie Barnet (1966, 1967)
- Nancy Wilson (1968)
- Harry James (1976, 1979)

Pop & rock-n-roll recording sessions

- The Monkees (1968)

== Selected filmography ==
- The Cool Sound, DVD (2004) OCLC 612182311

Recorded 1959
Miles Davis, John Coltrane, Wynton Kelly, Paul Chambers, Jimmy Cobb
Gil Evans Orchestra, Ernie Royal, Clyde Reasinger, Louis Mucci, Johnny Coles, Emmett Berry (trumpets); Frank Rehak, Jimmy Cleveland, Bill Elton, Rod Levitt (trombones); Julius Watkins, Bob Northern (French horns); Bill Barber (tuba); Danny Bank (bass clarinet); Romeo Penque, Eddie Caine (woodwinds)
