= Big Long Slidin' Thing =

1954 R&B song sung by Dinah Washington

Single by Dinah Washington
- B-side: "(No, No, No) You Can't Love Two"
- Released: June 1954
- Genre: Rhythm and blues
- Length: 2:59
- Label: Mercury
- Songwriters: Leroy Kirkland & Mamie Thomas

"Big Long Slidin' Thing" is a 1954 rhythm and blues song written by Leroy Kirkland and Mamie Thomas, sung by Dinah Washington, and arranged by Quincy Jones. It has been covered by a number of different artists, and has been rated as one of the best double entendre songs of all time.

== Double entendre ==
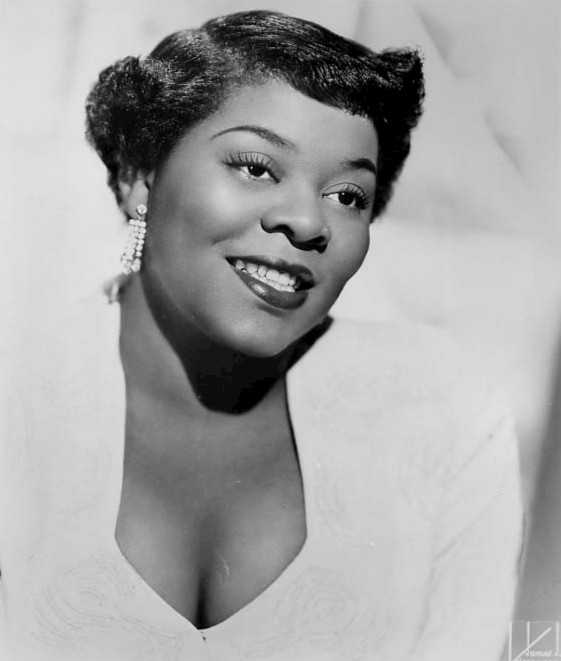
Dinah Washington in 1952

The song was written by Leroy Kirkland and Mamie Thomas. It is remembered for its sexual double entendre lyrics, referring to the singer's trombonist boyfriend and his skill in playing his instrument. The lyrics describe the singer's search in every bar and honky tonk for her trombone-playing man "with that big long slidin' thing". She encounters a guitar player who hitches his guitar amp in her "plug" and then "planked it" and "plunked it", but he is not "good enough" because she needs her daddy with that "big long slidin' thing". A piano player proposes "tinklin'" on her piano keys, but she wants her daddy. She describes how he can "blow through here" while working his finger and thumb, and "slide it right up" then "slide it back again".

Upon its release, the song caused outrage over its sexually suggestive lyrics. One newspaper predicted it would "probably be banned in Boston and on the networks."

In 2014, Salon rated "Big Long Slidin' Thing" as one of the 19 greatest double entendre songs of all time.

The record was dedicated to Washington's boyfriend and trombonist, Gus Chappell. However, three months after the song's release, Washington was injured when Chappell struck her in the head with a music stand.

== Versions ==
=== Original ===
The song was first recorded by Dinah Washington and released in 1954 as a single on Mercury Records. It was the first collaboration between Washington and Quincy Jones. Washington's original version of the song was re-issued in 1992 on Rhino Records' compact disc, Risque Rhythm, a compilation of classic R&B songs featuring sexually suggestive lyrics.

=== Covers ===
The song has subsequently covered by various artists, including:

- Michelle Wilson on Evil Gal Blues (1994)
- Miranda Louise on Face in My Dreams (1997)
- Sandra Hall on One Drop Will Do You (1997)
- The Randy Oxford Band on Festival and Teach You a Lesson
- Denise Perrier on Live at Yoshi's: Blue Monday Party (2004)
- Jeannie Lambert on Jeannie-ology (2005)
- Kristie Agee on Use What You Got (2006)
- Candye Kane on Burlesque Swing (2011)
- Ingrid Lucia & the Flying Neutrinos on Don't Stop (2007)

Additionally, A Mad World, My Masters, presented in 2013 by the Royal Shakespeare Company at the Swan Theatre, Stratford-upon-Avon, opened with Linda John-Pierre, backed by a jazz band, singing "Big Long Slidin' Thing" at a night club referred to as the Flamingo Club.
