= Music for a First Love =

Studio album by Dinah Washington
- Released: 1957
- Recorded: January 14, 1946 – September 1, 1950
- Venue: Chicago, New York
- Genre: Vocal jazz
- Label: Mercury Records MG 20119
- Producer: Bob Shad

Dinah Washington chronology
Dinah Washington Sings Fats Waller (1957)	Music for a First Love (1957)	Dinah Sings Bessie Smith (1958)

Professional ratings
Review scores
Source	Rating
Allmusic	3/5 stars

Music for a First Love is the eighth studio album by American jazz singer Dinah Washington released in 1957 via Mercury label. The tracks were recorded in various sessions between January 1946 and September 1950.

== Track listing ==
No.	Title	Writer(s)	Length
1.	"Embraceable You"	George Gershwin, Ira Gershwin	2:58
2.	"Stairway to the Stars"	Matty Malneck, Frank Signorelli, Mitchell Parish	3:01
3.	"Am I Asking Too Much"	Helen Miller, Fay Whitman	2:54
4.	"What Can I Say After I Say I'm Sorry"	Walter Donaldson, Abe Lyman	2:44
5.	"Harbor Lights"	Will Grosz, Jimmy Kennedy	3:07
6.	"How Deep Is the Ocean"	Irving Berlin	3:05
7.	"Time out for Tears"	Irving Berman, Abe Schiff	3:26
8.	"If I Loved You"	Rodgers and Hammerstein	2:32
9.	"I Want to Cry"	Harry Pirone, Lille Randall	3:16
10.	"It Isn't Fair"	Richard Himber, Frank Warshauer, Sylvester Sprigato	3:07
11.	"I Want to Be Loved"	Savannah Churchill	2:57
12.	"I Only Know"	Washington, Jackson	2:33

== Personnel ==
- Dinah Washington – vocals
- Willie Cook (1), Harry "Pee Wee" Jackson (1, 3), George Hudson (6, 12), Bob Merrill (9), Cootie Williams (9) - trumpet
- Gus Chappell (1), Benny Powell (possibly 11) - trombone
- Andrew Gardner (3) Rupert Cole (6, possibly 9, 12), Ernie Wilkins (6, 11-12) - alto sax
- Dave Young (possibly 1; 3), William Parker (9) - tenor sax
- Cecil Payne (6, 11-12) - baritone sax
- Tony Aless (2), Rudy Martin (possibly 1; 3-4), James Forman (6, 12), Arnold Jarvis (9) - piano
- Billy Bauer (2), Hurley Ramey (possibly 4), Freddie Green (6, 11-12), Mundell Lowe (9) - guitar
- Chubby Jackson (2), Bill Settles (possibly 1; 3-4), Ray Brown (6, 11-12), Leonard Swain (9) - bass
- Oliver Coleman (1), Curtis Walker (3), Teddy Stewart (6, 8, 10-12), Sylvester "Vess" Payne (9) - drums
- Jimmy Carroll, conductor (5, 7)
