= Finding Dory (soundtrack) =

Soundtrack album by Thomas Newman

Finding Dory (Original Motion Picture Soundtrack)

Soundtrack album by Thomas Newman
- Released: June 17, 2016
- Studios: DeepSleep Studios; Newman Scoring Stage; Sony Music; The Village
- Genre: Soundtrack
- Length: 68:20
- Label: Walt Disney
- Producers: Thomas Newman; Bill Bernstein

Thomas Newman chronology
Spectre (2015)	Finding Dory (Original Motion Picture Soundtrack) (2016)	Passengers (2016)

Singles from Finding Dory
- 1. "Unforgettable" Released: May 27, 2016

Finding Dory (Original Motion Picture Soundtrack) is the soundtrack album to the 2016 Disney/Pixar film of the same name. The original score is composed and conducted by Thomas Newman. The album was released by Walt Disney Records on June 17, 2016, the same day as the film's theatrical release.

== Background ==
In June 2014, Thomas Newman was hired to compose the soundtrack to Pixar and Andrew Stanton's Finding Dory (2016), after previously scoring Finding Nemo (2003) and WALL-E (2008), both directed by Stanton. Louis Armstrong's version of "What a Wonderful World" is played during the scene in which fish are released into the ocean as the truck Dory and Hank are driving crashes into the water. On May 20, 2016, Sia performed a cover of Nat King Cole's "Unforgettable" on The Ellen DeGeneres Show following an announcement that it would be featured in the film.

== Release and reception ==
The soundtrack album was released by Walt Disney Records on June 17, 2016, the same day as the film's theatrical release. El-ahrairah of Modern Topics gave a negative review of the film's score, writing "the music was entirely forgettable, relying too much on well-known classics like the ironic use of Nat King Cole's "Unforgettable" and Louis Armstrong's "Wonderful World". There were no original break-out hits in this film, which makes me long for the days of Walt Disney Animation Studios with their associable tunes. Even the otherwise unmemorable The Road to El Dorado (2000) featured an Elton John tune that made the entire soundtrack album worth a purchase". In August 2016, Newman's work on the soundtrack was nominated at the World Soundtrack Awards for "Soundtrack Composer of the Year". In November 2016, the film's score was nominated at the Hollywood Music in Media Awards for "Best Original Score in an Animated Film".

== Track listing ==
All music is composed by Thomas Newman, except where noted.

No.	Title	Performer	Length
1.	"Kelpcake"		0:46
2.	"Finding Dory (Main Title)"		0:55
3.	"Lost at Sea"		1:36
4.	"One Year Later"		2:24
5.	"Migration Song"		0:35
6.	"O, We're Going Home"		1:38
7.	"Jewel of Morro Bay"		2:00
8.	"Gnarly Chop"		1:39
9.	"Squid Chase"		1:28
10.	"Sigourney Weaver"		1:21
11.	"Hank"		3:19
12.	"Nobody's Fine"		3:29
13.	"Rebecca Darling"		1:54
14.	"Meet Destiny"		1:07
15.	"Joker at Work"		1:16
16.	"Becky Flies"		3:53
17.	"Hands!"		2:24
18.	"Almost Home"		2:01
19.	"Open Ocean"		3:18
20.	"Two Lefts and a Right"		3:57
21.	"Everything About You"		1:41
22.	"Quarantine"		2:41
23.	"Warp"		1:03
24.	"All Alone"		0:53
25.	"...Shells"		4:47
26.	"No Walls"		2:25
27.	"Okay with Crazy"		1:50
28.	"Hide and Seek"		1:51
29.	"Quite a View"		1:25
30.	"Unforgettable (End Title)"	Sia	3:17
31.	"Three Hearts (End Title)"		3:29
32.	"Loon Tune"		1:20
33.	"Fish Who Wander"		1:18
34.	"Release"		1:13
Total length:			1:08:20
