= Newport '58 =

Live album by Dinah Washington
- Released: 1958
- Recorded: July 6, 1958
- Genre: Vocal jazz
- Label: EmArcy

Dinah Washington chronology
Dinah Sings Bessie Smith (1958)	Newport '58 (1958)	What a Diff'rence a Day Makes! (1959)

Professional ratings
Review scores
Source	Rating
Mercury Records Collection	9/10 stars
allmusic	3/5 stars

Newport '58 is the second live album by vocalist Dinah Washington. It was recorded on July 6, 1958, at the Newport Jazz Festival, Newport, Rhode Island, and arranged by Melba Liston.

== Track listing ==
1. "Lover, Come Back to Me" (Sigmund Romberg, Oscar Hammerstein II) – 2:16
2. "Backwater Blues" (Bessie Smith) – 4:33
3. "Crazy Love" (Sammy Cahn, Phil Tuminello) – 3:27
4. "All of Me" (Gerald Marks, Seymour Simons) – 5:18
5. "Backstage Blues" (Instrumental) (Don Elliott, Terry Gibbs, Urbie Green) – 9:10
6. "Julie and Jake" (Instrumental) (Gibbs) – 8:40

=== Outtakes ===
2 previously unreleased tracks included in The Complete Dinah Washington on Mercury, Vol. 5 (1956–1958) CD (1991).

- "Send Me to the 'Lectric Chair" (George Brooks, Fletcher Henderson) – 3:53
- "Me and My Gin" (Harry Burke) – 3:26

== Personnel ==
- Dinah Washington – vocals, vibraphone
- Blue Mitchell – trumpet
- Melba Liston – trombone, arranger
- Urbie Green – trombone
- Sahib Shihab – baritone saxophone
- Harold Ousley – tenor saxophone
- Terry Gibbs – vibraphone
- Don Elliott – vibraphone, mellophone
- Wynton Kelly – piano
- Paul West – bass
- Max Roach – drums
- Jack Tracy – producer

== See also ==
- "Jazz on a Summer's Day" – the film also features "All of Me" performed by Washington.
