= Henry (Hank) Sylvern =

American keyboardist, composer and conductor

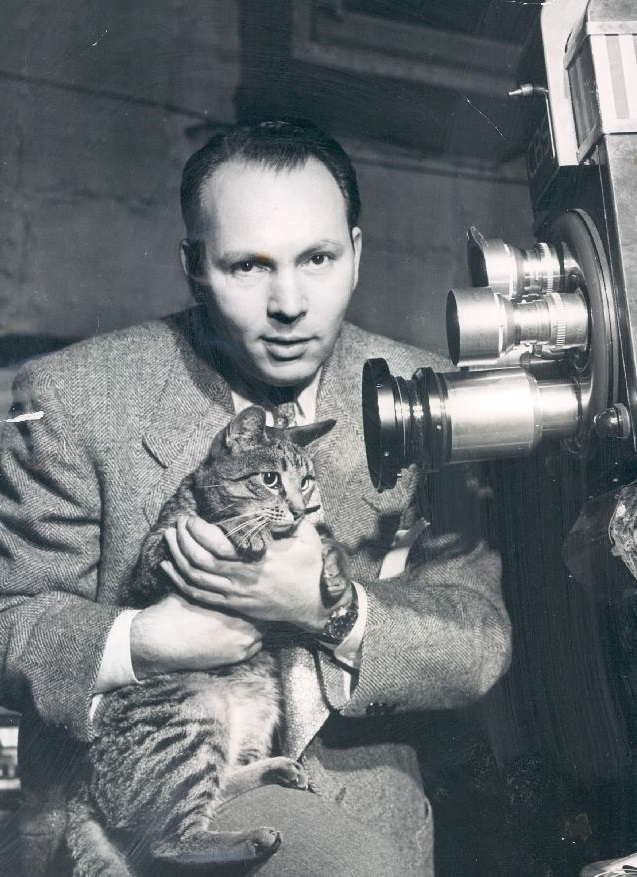
Henry Sylvern in 1956

Henry "Hank" Sylvern (born Henry Silverstein, March 26, 1908 – July 4, 1964) was an American keyboardist, composer, conductor and arranger.

== Early life and career ==
Born and raised in Brooklyn, New York, Sylvern was the eldest of three children born to Herman Silverstein and Mary Sheflin. He began his music studies at the Paris Conservatory and later attended New York University.

Silvern's first nationwide exposure came via his 1941 collaboration with lyricist Ruth Poll, "I'm a Military Man Now," which, at Treasury Secretary Henry Morgenthau's request, was unveiled on the premiere broadcast of a revamped version of the U.S. Treasury's wartime radio series, The Treasury Hour—Millions for Defense.

Subsequently, Sylvern worked on many radio and television shows, some of which are listed below:

Nick Carter, Master Detective, radio series, 1943
Arthur Godfrey Time, 1945, radio series, 1945
Suspense, 1949, TV series; musical director
Tom Corbett, Space Cadet, 1950, TV series; theme song composer
USA Canteen (aka The Jane Froman Show), 1952, TV series; orchestra leader and musical director
The Phil Silvers Show (aka Sergeant Bilko, "You'll Never Get Rich"), 1955, TV series
Dotto, 1958, TV series
Make a Face 1961, TV series

He was also an organist who played music for innumerable radio shows and also wrote the following radio show theme songs:

Mark Trail, The Adventures of Rin Tin Tin, Space Academy, Strike It Rich

Sylvern recorded a Christmas album named Christmas in Hi-Fi (Organ, Bells, Chimes). He also wrote the music for an MGM children's story-telling LP record (CH-103), The Wonderful World of Fairy Tales. He played the organ while Robert Q. Lewis told The Ugly Duckling, The Pied Piper of Hamelin, The Sleeping Beauty, The Steadfast Tin Soldier, Jack and the Beanstalk, Rapunzel, Beauty and the Beast, Rumpelstiltskin, Pinocchio, Thumbelina, The Little Mermaid, and The Wizard of Oz stories.

Between 1945 and 1949, Sylvern worked alongside his second wife, Jeanne Harrison—she as director, he as musical director—on a number of radio programs, most notably Adventures of Boston Blackie. In addition they recorded two records for children.

In June 1950, Sylvern was named "outstanding musical director of radio and TV for 1949-50" by Song Hits Magazine. In 1956, he was elected to the Board of Governors of the Academy of Television Arts & Sciences Foundation.

== Personal life and death ==
Sylvern was married at least twice: first—from January 7, 1934 until her death on January 12, 1942—to Pearl Flexer, with whom he had a daughter, Bryna, and then—from February 2, 1946 until their divorce, circa spring 1952—to radio and TV producer-director, Jeanne—aka "Jean"—Harrison.

On July 4, 1964, Sylvern died of undisclosed causes at his home in the Turtle Bay neighborhood of Manhattan.
