= Bo Rhambo =

American jazz musician (1923–1988)

- Born: September 21, 1923; Austin, Texas, U.S.
- Died: November 24, 1988 (aged 65) Los Angeles, California, U.S.
- Instruments: Trumpet; Tenor saxophone
- Labels: Imperial; Cash

Ewell Goldyn Rhambo, known as Bo Rhambo, (September 21, 1923 – November 24, 1988) was an American trumpeter and tenor saxophonist who was born in Austin, Texas and died in Los Angeles, California.

Originally a trumpeter, he organized his band playing local dances and parties. He then went on to play tenor saxophone. In 1952, he played with Joe Houston, then in 1953 recorded with Joe Liggins. In the 1950s, he led a trio with the pianist-organist Teddy Woods and drummer Bobby Pittman, recording for Cash Records then for Imperial in 1959-60.

Rhambo performed at the famed twelfth Cavalcade of Jazz held at Wrigley Field in Los Angeles which was produced by Leon Hefflin, Sr. on September 2, 1956. Also performing that day were Dinah Washington, The Mel Williams Dots, Julie Stevens, Little Richard, Chuck Higgin's Orchestra, Willie Hayden & Five Black Birds, The Premiers, Gerald Wilson and His 20-Pc. Recording Orchestra and Jerry Gray and his Orchestra. He came back to perform at the final fourteenth Cavalcade of Jazz which was held at the Shrine Auditorium on August 3, 1958. Also performing that same day were Ray Charles with The Cookies and Ann Fisher, Ernie Freeman and his Band, Little Willie John, Sam Cooke, The Clark Kids and Sammy Davis Jr. who was there to crown the queen.

In 1978, he played on a Joe Houston recording session (Kicking Back on Big Town 1004).

== Discography ==
- Diane (Imperial)
- Enchanted Melodies (Imperial)
- Tender Moments (Imperial)

== Sources ==
- The Aladdin/Imperial Labels: A Discography (Michel Ruppli, 1991)
