= Blazing Ballads =

1952 album by Dinah Washington

Studio album by Dinah Washington
- Released: 1952
- Recorded: April 12, June 1, September 24, 1951
- Genre: Jazz
- Label: Mercury

Dinah Washington chronology
Dynamic Dinah! – The Great Voice of Dinah Washington (1950)	Blazing Ballads (1952)	After Hours with Miss "D" (1954)

Professional ratings
Review scores
Source	Rating
Allmusic	link

Blazing Ballads is a 1952 album by Dinah Washington, arranged by Jimmy Carroll, Nook Shrier and Ike Carpenter.

== Track listing ==
1. "My Heart Cries for You" (Carl Sigman, Percy Faith)
2. "I Apologize" (Al Hoffman, Al Goodhart, Ed Nelson)
3. "I Won't Cry Any More" (Al Frisch, Fred Wise)
4. "Don't Say You're Sorry Again" (Lee Pearl, Art Berman, Eugene West)
5. "Mixed Emotions" (Stuart F. Louchheim)
6. "Cold, Cold Heart" (Hank Williams)
7. "Baby, Did You Hear?"
8. "Just One More Chance" (Arthur Johnston, Sam Coslow)

== Personnel ==
- Dinah Washington – vocals on all tracks.

=== Tracks 1 to 4 ===
- Orchestra with Strings conducted by Jimmy Carroll

=== Tracks 5 to 7 ===
- Orchestra conducted by Nook Shrier, including:
- Paul Quinichette – tenor saxophone
- Wynton Kelly – piano
- Gus Johnson – drums

=== Track 8 ===
- Orchestra conducted by Ike Carpenter, including:
- Clyde Reasinger – trumpet
- Tom Reeves – trumpet
- Art Pearlman, Roger White – trombone
- Ed Freeman, alto saxophone
- Bob Hardaway, Bob Robinson – tenor saxophone
- Joe Koch – baritone saxophone
- Wynton Kelly – piano
- Chuck Norris – guitar
- Joe O'Rear – bass
- Dick Stanton – drums
