= A Stranger on Earth =

Studio album by Dinah Washington
- Released: 1964
- Genre: Vocal jazz; traditional pop
- Label: Roulette
- Producer: Henry Glover

Dinah Washington chronology
In Tribute (1964)	A Stranger on Earth (1964)	The Queen and Quincy (1965)

A Stranger on Earth is a studio album by American singer Dinah Washington, released in 1964 by Roulette Records after her death. The album contains unreleased material by the singer, recorded with producer Henry Glover and arranger Fred Norman.

== Critical reception ==
Professional ratings
Review scores
Source	Rating
AllMusic	3/5 stars

A reviewer for Billboard magazine wrote that this album is filled with Washington's magnificent diction, a heartfelt set of female sadness with a firm heart, and although, in his opinion, nothing in these songs suits a lady, but the lady who sings them does everything right. Ron Wynn of AllMusic noted that this is a brilliant album that confirmed Washington's place among the greatest vocalists in any style.

== Track listing ==
1. "A Stranger on Earth" (Rick Ward, Sid Feller) – 3:09
2. "The Blues Ain't Nothin' But a Woman Cryin for Her Man" (J. Mayo Williams) – 3:46
3. "Drown in My Own Tears" (Henry Glover) – 2:32
4. "It's a Mean Old Man's World" (Dinah Washington, Leroy Kirkland, Pearl Woods) – 2:50
5. "Nobody Knows How I Feel This Morning" (Pearl Delaney, Tom Delaney) – 8:39
6. "Me and My Gin" (Harry Burke) – 3:05
7. "The Man That Got Away" (Harold Arlen, Ira Gershwin) – 3:30
8. "Soulville" (Titus Turner) – 2:16
9. "Do Nothin' Til You Hear from Me" (Bob Russell, Duke Ellington) – 2:16
10. "You've Been a Good Old Wagon" (John Henry) – 3:50

== Personnel ==
- Dinah Washington – vocals
- Marty Manning – arrangement (1)
- Fred Norman – arrangement (2, 4–8, 10)
- Howard Biggs – arrangement (3)
- Don Costa – arrangement (9)
- Henry Glover – production

== Charts ==
Chart performance for A Stranger on Earth
Chart (1964)	Peak position
US (Billboard Top LP's)	130
