= The Swingin' Miss "D" =

The Swingin' Miss D

Studio album by Dinah Washington
- Released: September 1957
- Recorded: December 4–6, 1956
- Genre: Vocal jazz
- Length: 31:38 (Original)
- Label: EmArcy
- Producer: Bob Shad

Dinah Washington chronology
In the Land of Hi-Fi (1956)	The Swingin' Miss D (1957)	Dinah Washington Sings Fats Waller (1957)

Professional ratings
Review scores
Source	Rating
Allmusic	4.5/5 stars
The Penguin Guide to Jazz Recordings	3.5/4 stars

The Swingin' Miss D is the sixth studio album by Dinah Washington, arranged by Quincy Jones. It was recorded in December 1956 and released in September 1957.

== Track listing ==
1. "They Didn't Believe Me" (Jerome Kern, Herbert Reynolds) – 2:44
2. "You're Crying" (Leonard Feather, Quincy Jones) – 3:29
3. "Makin' Whoopee" (Walter Donaldson, Gus Kahn) – 2:26
4. "Ev'ry Time We Say Goodbye" (Cole Porter) – 2:27
5. "But Not for Me" (George Gershwin, Ira Gershwin) – 2:25
6. "Caravan" (Duke Ellington, Irving Mills, Juan Tizol) – 2:37
7. "Perdido" (Ervin Drake, H. J. Lengsfelder, Tizol) – 3:23
8. "Never Let Me Go" (Ray Evans, Jay Livingston) – 2:42
9. "Is You Is or Is You Ain't My Baby?" (Billy Austin, Louis Jordan) – 2:56
10. "I'll Close My Eyes" (Buddy Kaye, Billy Reid) – 3:57
11. "Somebody Loves Me" (Buddy DeSylva, George Gershwin, Ballard MacDonald) – 2:32

Additional tracks on 1998 CD reissue

12. "I'll Drown in My Tears" (Henry Glover) – 3:09
13. "You Let My Love Grow Cold" (Jessie Mae Robinson) – 2:26
14. "Bargain Day" (William Roy) – 2:50
15. "Relax Max" (Al Frisch, Sid Wayne) – 2:42
16. "Tears to Burn" (Alberts, Bruce) – 2:44
17. "The Kissing Way Home" (Harold Solomon, Manny Kurtz) – 2:23
18. "I Know" (Dick Felt, Russell Hallowell, Teddy Powell) – 3:07
- 15–18 recorded June 25, 1956
- 12, 13 recorded November 21, 1956
- 6, 7, 9, 11 recorded December 4, 1956
- 1, 2, 4, 5 recorded December 5, 1956
- 3, 8, 10, 14 recorded December 6, 1956

== Personnel ==
=== Performance ===
- Dinah Washington - vocals

Quincy Jones and His Orchestra

- Quincy Jones - conductor, arranger (except tracks 4, 5 and 8)
- Ernie Wilkins - arranger (4 and 5)
- Benny Golson - arranger (8)
- Don Elliott - trumpet, mellophonium, vibraphone, bongos; xylophone (3)
- Jimmy Maxwell - trumpet
- Doc Severinsen - trumpet
- Charlie Shavers - trumpet
- Clark Terry - trumpet
- Bernie Glow - trumpet (1–5, 8, 10, 14)
- Nick Travis - trumpet (1–5, 8, 10, 14)
- Ernie Royal - trumpet (6, 7, 9, 11–13)
- Joe Wilder - trumpet (6, 7, 9, 11–13)
- Jimmy Cleveland - trombone
- Urbie Green - trombone
- Quentin Jackson - trombone
- Tommy Mitchell - bass trombone
- Hal McKusick - flute, alto saxophone
- Anthony Ortega - alto saxophone, clarinet
- Jerome Richardson - tenor saxophone, clarinet
- Lucky Thompson - tenor saxophone, clarinet
- Danny Bank - bass clarinet, baritone saxophone
- Clarence "Sleepy" Anderson - piano, celeste
- Barry Galbraith - guitar
- Milt Hinton - double bass
- Osie Johnson - drums (1–5, 8, 10, 14)
- Jimmy Crawford - drums (6, 7, 9, 11–13)

=== Production ===
- Bob Shad - orig. producer
- John S. Wilson - orig. liner notes
- Murray Garrett and Gene Howard - photography

Reissue

- Ben Young - producer and supervisor, research, restoration
- Carlos Kase - assistant producer
- Peter Pullman - editing
- Suha Gur - digital mastering
- Tom Greenwood and Bryan Koniarz - production coordination
- Richard Seidel - executive producer
- Brian Priestley - liner notes
- Patricia Lie and Hat Nguyen - art direction
- Sheryl Lutz-Brown - design
- Chuck Stewart - photography
