= In the Land of Hi-Fi (Dinah Washington album) =

Studio album by Dinah Washington
- Released: 1956
- Recorded: April 1956
- Genres: Jazz; blues; pop standards
- Length: 30:34
- Label: EmArcy
- Producer: Bob Shad

Dinah Washington chronology
| Dinah! (1956) | In the Land of Hi-Fi (1956) | The Swingin' Miss "D" (1957) |

In the Land of Hi-Fi is the fifth studio album by the blues, R&B and jazz singer Dinah Washington, released in 1956 on the Emarcy label. The album includes a mix of jazz, popular and blues standards of the period, all selected to emphasize the vocalist's style.

== Critical reception ==
Professional ratings
Review scores
| Source | Rating |
|---|---|
| AllMusic | 4.5/5 stars |
| The Penguin Guide to Jazz Recordings | 3/4 stars |

AllMusic characterized the album as "yet another impressive set among the many fine EmArcy records Washington cut in the '50s."

== Track listing ==
1. "Our Love Is Here to Stay" (George Gershwin, Ira Gershwin) – 3:06
2. "Let Me Love You" (Bart Howard) – 2:09
3. "There'll Be a Jubilee" (Phil Moore) – 2:06
4. "My Ideal" (Newell Chase, Leo Robin, Richard Whiting) – 2:19
5. "I've Got a Crush on You" (Gershwin, Gershwin) – 3:03
6. "Let's Do It (Let's Fall in Love)" (Cole Porter) – 2:36
7. "Nothing Ever Changes My Love for You" (Marvin Fisher, Jack Segal) – 2:33
8. "What'll I Tell My Heart" (Jack Lawrence, Peter Tinturin) – 3:16
9. "On the Sunny Side of the Street" (Dorothy Fields, Jimmy McHugh) – 2:26
10. "Say It Isn't So" (Irving Berlin) – 2:40
11. "Sometimes I'm Happy" (Irving Caesar, Clifford Grey, Vincent Youmans) – 2:16
12. "If I Were a Bell" (Frank Loesser) – 2:04

== Personnel ==
- Dinah Washington – Lead Vocals
- Cannonball Adderley – alto saxophone
- Dennis Drake – remastering
- Ellie Hughes – graphic design
- Tom Hughes – graphic design
- Junior Mance – piano
- Hal Mooney – arranger, conductor
- Seth Rothstein – production
- Richard Seidel – production
- Bob Shad – producer
