= For Those in Love =

Studio album by Dinah Washington
- Released: June 1955
- Recorded: March 15–17, 1955
- Genre: Vocal jazz
- Length: 48:31
- Labels: EmArcy, Verve (reissue)
- Producer: Bob Shad

Dinah Washington chronology
Dinah Jams (1955)	For Those in Love (1955)	Dinah! (1956)

Professional ratings
Review scores
Source	Rating
The Penguin Guide to Jazz Recordings	3.5/4 stars

For Those in Love is a studio album by the American jazz vocalist Dinah Washington with musical arrangements by Quincy Jones. It was originally released by EmArcy Records in June 1955, and was reissued by EmArcy Records in 1991.

== In popular culture ==
Washington's version of "I Could Write a Book", which appears as the seventh track of For Those in Love, was used in the ninth episode of the first season of the American television series Ash vs Evil Dead.

== Track listing ==
1. "I Get a Kick Out of You" (Cole Porter) – 6:17
2. "Blue Gardenia" (Lester Lee, Bob Russell) – 5:18
3. "Easy Living" (Ralph Rainger, Leo Robin) – 5:00
4. "You Don't Know What Love Is" (Don Raye, Gene de Paul) – 4:02
5. "This Can't Be Love" (Rodgers and Hart) – 6:50
6. "My Old Flame" (Sam Coslow, Arthur Johnston) – 3:05
7. "I Could Write a Book" (Rodgers and Hart) – 4:23
8. "Make the Man Love Me" (Dorothy Fields, Arthur Schwartz) – 5:23

Additional tracks on 1992 CD reissue

9. "Ask a Woman Who Knows" (Victor Abrams) – 3:14
10. "If I Had You" (Jimmy Campbell and Reg Connelly) – 4:45

== Personnel ==
- Dinah Washington – lead vocals
- Clark Terry – trumpet
- Paul Quinichette – tenor saxophone
- Cecil Payne – baritone saxophone
- Jimmy Cleveland – trombone
- Wynton Kelly – piano
- Barry Galbraith – guitar
- Keter Betts – bass
- Jimmy Cobb – drums
