= Tears and Laughter (Dinah Washington album) =

Studio album by Dinah Washington
- Released: 1962
- Genre: Vocal jazz; traditional pop
- Label: Mercury

Dinah Washington chronology
I Wanna Be Loved (1962)	Tears and Laughter (1962)	Drinking Again (1962)

Tears and Laughter is a fourteenth studio album by Dinah Washington with Orchestra conducted by Quincy Jones, that was released on Mercury Records (in mono MG 20661 and stereo SR-60661). The orchestral arrangements, partly with strings for the jazz standard repertoire, were provided by Jones, Hal Mooney, Al Cohn, Ernie Wilkins and Billy Byers. On the second half –the B-side– of the original LP release Washington is backed by the male doo-wop quintet The Dells, who toured with her as the opening act since 1960. They are also featured without Washington on "Jeepers Creepers", and "Am I Blue?" is a duet with one of them.

The album received a rating of three stars from AllMusic.

All tracks from the album (except the Dinah-less "Jeepers Creepers") were included in the 1989 3-CD set The Complete Dinah Washington On Mercury Vol. 7: 1961 (Mercury Records 838 900-2); this collection included the previously unissued recording "So In Love" (Cole Porter) from the album sessions, and this track has been substituted for "Jeepers Creepers" in the download and streaming re-issue of this album by Verve Records on 4 October 2019.

Professional ratings
Review scores
Source	Rating
AllMusic	3/5 stars
The Encyclopedia of Popular Music	3/5 stars
New Record Mirror	4/5 stars

== Track listing ==
1. "Bewitched" (Rodgers and Hart) – 2:19
2. "In the Wee Small Hours of the Morning" (David Mann, Bob Hilliard) – 2:13
3. "Mood Indigo" (Duke Ellington, Barney Bigard, Irving Mills) – 2:25
4. "Am I Blue?" (Harry Akst, Grant Clarke) – 2:52
5. "I'm a Fool to Want You" (Frank Sinatra, Jack Wolf, Joel Herron) – 3:00
6. "Tears and Laughter" (Miriam Lewis) – 2:50
7. "Secret Love" (Sammy Fain, Paul Francis Webster) – 2:48
8. "You Do Something to Me" (Cole Porter) – 2:20
9. "If I Should Lose You" (Ralph Rainger, Leo Robin) – 2:43
10. "Jeepers Creepers" (Harry Warren, Johnny Mercer) – 2:02
11. "Wake the Town and Tell the People" (Jerry Livingston, Sammy Gallop) – 2:38
12. "I Just Found Out About Love" (Jimmy McHugh, Harold Adamson) – 2:46

== Personnel ==
- Dinah Washington – vocals (except track 10)
- Quincy Jones – conductor
- The Dells – backing vocals (tracks 7–12)
- Joe Newman, Clark Terry, Ernie Wilkins – trumpet
- Jimmy Cleveland, Kai Winding, Billy Byers – trombone
- Al Cohn – tenor saxophone
- Patti Bown – piano
- George Barnes – guitar
- unknown bass and drums
- unidentified orchestra
