= Cavalcade of Jazz =

American jazz festival series (1945–1958)

The Cavalcade of Jazz events were large outdoor jazz festivals held annually between 1945 and 1956 at Wrigley Field, Los Angeles, California, with the last one held indoors at the Shrine Auditorium in 1958. They were the first such large-scale events and were produced by an African American, Leon Hefflin Sr.

Historical research and contemporary newspaper coverage identify the Cavalcade of Jazz, produced by Leon Hefflin Sr. beginning in 1945—as one of the earliest large, scale recurring jazz festivals in the United States.[1]

Hefflin was an entrepreneur who had started promoting dances and concerts for Black residents of Los Angeles in the 1930s. The first Cavalcade of Jazz was held on September 23, 1945, and starred Count Basie, the Honeydrippers, Valaida Snow, Joe Turner, the Peters Sisters, Slim and Bam, and other artists. Attendance was some 15,000.

Subsequent festivals were widely promoted across the city, with Hefflin's aim being to "cement" race relations. The Los Angeles Sentinel reported, "The Cavalcade of Jazz is a tremendous talent showcase. It is eagerly looked forward to by countless entertainment goers of all ages, colors and creeds." A wide range of musicians were involved, including Lionel Hampton (on multiple occasions), Louis Jordan, and Josephine Baker. The Cavalcade of Jazz events were the stepping stone to success for such stars as Toni Harper, Dinah Washington, Roy Milton, Frankie Laine, and others. Hefflin also hosted annual beauty contests at the events.

Hefflin's last concert was held at the Shrine Auditorium on August 3, 1958, as part of the Central Avenue Jazz Scene. Between 1945 and 1958, the Cavalcade of Jazz showcased more than 125 artists, including Sam Cooke, Bo Rhambo and Band, Ray Charles, The Cookies, Ernie Freeman and his Band, Little Willie John, The Clark Kids, and Sammy Davis Jr.
