= Drinking Again (album) =

Studio album by Dinah Washington
- Released: September 1962
- Recorded: 1962
- Genre: Vocal jazz
- Length: 37:02
- Label: Roulette

Dinah Washington chronology
Dinah '62 (1962)	Drinking Again (1962)	Tears and Laughter (1962)

Drinking Again is the 13th studio album by singer Dinah Washington that was released in 1962 by Roulette Records. The album was arranged by Don Costa and contains cover versions of jazz, blues, and pop standards.

Washington died during the next year from a combination of alcohol and diet pills.

== Chart performance ==
The album debuted on Billboard magazine's Top LP's chart in the issue dated October 20, 1962, peaking at No. 78 during a nine-week run on the chart.

Professional ratings
Review scores
Source	Rating
Allmusic	3/5 stars

== Track listing ==
1. "Drinking Again" (Johnny Mercer, Doris Tauber) - 3:31
2. "Just Friends" (John Klenner, Sam M. Lewis) - 3:18
3. "I'm Gonna Laugh You Right Out of My Life" (Cy Coleman, Joseph A. McCarthy) - 2:53
4. "I'll Be Around" (Alec Wilder) - 2:57
5. "Lament (Love, I Found You Gone)" (Joe Bailey) - 2:17
6. "I Don't Know You Anymore" (Peter Udell, Gary Geld) - 2:49
7. "Baby Won't You Please Come Home" (Charles Warfield, Clarence Williams) - 2:08
8. "Lover Man (Oh, Where Can You Be?)" (Jimmy Davis, Roger ("Ram") Ramirez, James Sherman) - 3:03
9. "The Man That Got Away" (Harold Arlen, Ira Gershwin) - 3:34
10. "For All We Know" (J. Fred Coots, Sam M. Lewis) - 3:15
11. "Say It Isn't So" (Irving Berlin) - 3:10
12. "On the Street of Regret" (Klenner, Pete Wendling) - 2:14

== Charts ==
Chart (1962)	Peak position
US Billboard Top LPs (Monoraul)	78

== Personnel ==
- Dinah Washington - vocals
- Don Costa - arranger
