= Mindy Carson =

American singer (1927–2025)

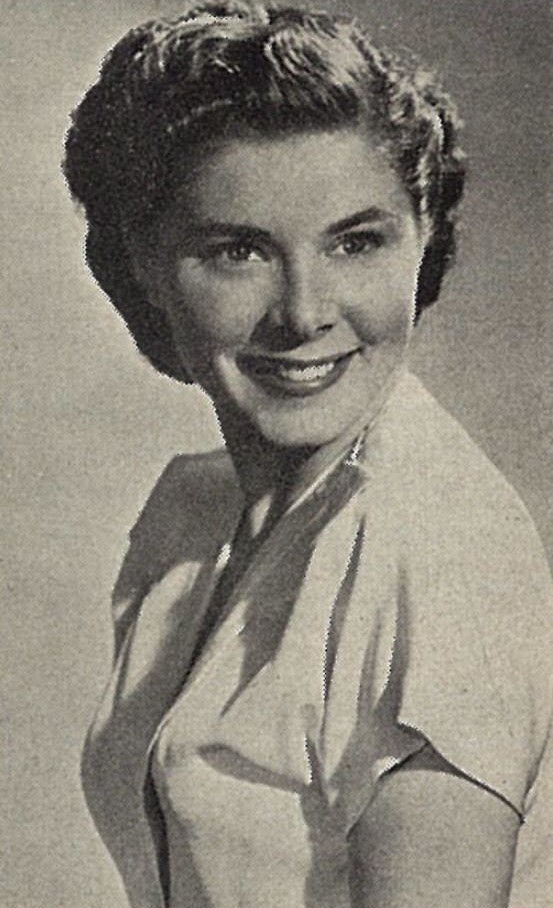
- Carson c. 1950

Background information
- Born: July 16, 1927; The Bronx, New York City, U.S.
- Died: October 2, 2025 (aged 98) Staten Island, New York City, U.S.
- Genres: Traditional pop
- Labels: RCA Victor; Columbia
- Spouse(s): Eddie Joy (m. 1949-2025; her death, 3 children)

Mindy Carson (July 16, 1927 – October 2, 2025) was an American traditional pop vocalist. She was heard often on radio during the 1940s and 1950s.

== Early life ==
Born on July 16, 1927, Carson grew up in the Bronx, graduating from James Monroe High School. After graduation, she took a position as typist and stenographer, and she worked at a candy company.

== Radio ==
In 1946, while still in her teens, Carson won an audition for the radio program Stairway to the Stars. This gave her a chance to perform for eight months in 1947, with Paul Whiteman's band and singer Martha Tilton, stars of the program. The first recording Carson appeared on was "Rumors Are Flying" / "The Whole World is Singing My Song" with the Harry Cool Orchestra on Signature Records. She also released one disc with the Paul Whiteman Orchestra, and then signed with Musicraft, releasing four discs for the label.

None of these early recordings attracted any attention, but she did receive considerable radio exposure. She was heard on Guy Lombardo's syndicated program in the late 1940s, and her own variety program, which began on the CBS Network in 1949. She also had her own thrice-weekly program, sponsored by the U.S. Army, in 1950. She was widely promoted as one of the guests on the November 5, 1950 premiere of NBC's The Big Show, hosted by Tallulah Bankhead.

== Television ==
Beginning in 1949, Carson was a regular for two years on Florian Zabach's NBC television variety program. On December 30, 1952 she began the Mindy Carson Show, sponsored by Embassy cigarettes, on NBC.

== Recordings ==
Carson signed with RCA Victor in 1949. The initial several records she cut for the label failed to sell but the success of Eileen Barton's novelty hit "If I Knew You Were Coming I'd've Baked a Cake" prompted RCA to try a similar recording for her. Her recording of "Candy and Cake" was backed with "My Foolish Heart" and the record became a rare two-sided hit. Follow-up records failed to sell and Carson was dropped from RCA in 1952.

Carson then went to Columbia Records, and her duet with Guy Mitchell, "Cause I Love You That's-A-Why", reached no. 25 on the Billboard chart. She also guest-starred on ABC's 1957 series The Guy Mitchell Show. "All the Time and Everywhere", a big hit in the United Kingdom for Dickie Valentine, went nowhere for Carson and other U.S. recording artists. A cover of The Gaylords' big hit "Tell Me You're Mine" charted at no. 22, and other recordings made the top 30 in 1952, 1953 and 1954. Her cover of "Memories Are Made of This" with the Ray Conniff Orchestra was issued in 1955.

In August 1955, she scored a hit when her recording of "Wake the Town and Tell the People" reached no. 13, despite the fact that the trends in popular music were moving to rock and roll and, like many of her contemporaries, she did not have much feel for the format. Carson had a minor hit with "The Fish", the single prior to "Wake the Town...", which was a light rocker based on a proposed dance craze. The record appeared in both the Cashbox and Music Vendor retail surveys. She had only one more hit, with a white R&B cover of Ivory Joe Hunter's "Since I Met You Baby" in 1957. Carson was dropped from Columbia in 1958. She released three more singles on Philips, Joy, and W&G Records before retiring from recording in 1960. Carson also recorded two LPs, Mindy Carson and Orchestra, and Baby, Baby, Baby, both based around the gimmick of every song having a variation of the same title.

== Broadway ==
In 1958, she appeared on Broadway in The Body Beautiful by Sheldon Harnick and Jerry Bock, their first musical collaboration. Carson returned to Broadway in the 1960s in two comedies, Mary, Mary (1961–64) and Dinner at Eight (1966-67).

== Clubs ==
In 1949, Carson became the youngest performer to receive top billing at New York City's Copacabana nightclub. She also performed at clubs in New Orleans, Baltimore, and other cities.

== Personal life and death ==
Carson married music publisher Eddie Joy in September 1949. They had three daughters: Jenny, Jody, and Cathy.

Carson died on Staten Island on October 2, 2025, at the age of 98.
