= Dinah! (album) =

Studio album by Dinah Washington
- Released: 1956
- Recorded: January 11 and November 11, 1955 in Los Angeles and New York City, United States
- Genre: Vocal jazz; blues; traditional pop
- Length: 53:25
- Label: EmArcy
- Producer: Bob Shad

Dinah Washington chronology
For Those in Love (1955)	Dinah! (1956)	In the Land of Hi-Fi (1956)

Professional ratings
Review scores
Source	Rating
Allmusic	4.5/5 stars
The Penguin Guide to Jazz Recordings	3/4 stars

Dinah! is a fourth studio album by blues, R&B and jazz singer Dinah Washington released on the EmArcy label. The album includes a mix of jazz, popular and blues standards of the period, all selected to emphasize the vocalist's style.

== Reception ==
Allmusic details the album in its review as saying:

Dinah! includes a very enjoyable mix of medium-tempo and after-hours vocal numbers. On a handful of cuts, Washington gets into the kind of smoldering and declamatory blues mode she excelled at.

— Stephen Cook, All Music Guide

The single "Make Me a Present of You" peaked at #27 on the Billboard Hot R&B Sides chart in 1958.

== Track listing ==
Side A
No.	Title	Lyrics	Music	Length
1.	"Look to the Rainbow"	Yip Harburg	Burton Lane	2:48
2.	"Ill Wind^{[d]}"	Ted Koehler	Harold Arlen	3:39
3.	"A Cottage for Sale^{[a]}"	Larry Conley	Willard Robison	3:18
4.	"All of Me^{[d]}"	Gerald Marks, Seymour Simons	Marks, Simons	3:45
5.	"More Than You Know^{[c]}"	Billy Rose, Edward Eliscu	Vincent Youmans	3:52
6.	"There'll Be Some Changes Made^{[c]}"	Billy Higgins	Benton Overstreet	3:02

Side B
No.	Title	Lyrics	Music	Length
7.	"Goodbye^{[b]}"	Gordon Jenkins	Jenkins	3:21
8.	"Willow Weep for Me^{[d]}"	Ann Ronell	Ronell	3:28
9.	"Make Me a Present of You^{[c]}"	Joe Greene	Greene	3:46
10.	"Smoke Gets in Your Eyes^{[b]}"	Otto Harbach	Jerome Kern	3:24
11.	"I Could Have Told You^{[c]}"	Carl Sigman	Jimmy Van Heusen	3:14
12.	"Accent on Youth^{[d]}"	Tot Seymour	Vee Lawnhurst	3:20

Additional tracks on later releases

1. "What Is This Thing Called Love?"^{[b]}

- Cole Porter (lyrics and music) – 6:45

1. "The Show Must Go On"^{[b]}

- Albert Frisch (music); Roy Alfred (words) – 2:27

1. "The Birth of the Blues"^{[b]}

- Ray Henderson (music); Buddy G. DeSylva, Lew Brown (lyrics) – 3:56

Notes

- ^{^[a]} – Recorded January 12, 1955 in New York.
- ^{^[b]} – November 10, 1955 in Los Angeles.
- ^{^[c]} – November 11, 1955 in Los Angeles.
- ^{^[d]} – November 12, 1955 in Los Angeles.

== Selected re-issues and compilations ==
Re-issues

Dinah!

- PolyGram (CD) (©1991)
- New program notes by James Isaacs (of WBUR-FM)
- OCLC 25107940

Compilations

The Complete Dinah Washington on Mercury

- CD 2 of 3
- Vol. 4 of 7
- Tokyo: Manufactured and distributed by Nippon Phonogram Co. (Note: Nippon Phonogram Co., Ltd., was a Japanese record company that was founded June 1, 1970. It was a joint venture between Victor and Matsushita (owning 60%) and Philips Phonografische Industrie (owning 40%). The company mainly distributed the Phonogram labels Philips, Fontana, Mercury, Island, Vertigo and Charisma. Vinyl records were mastered and pressed by the Victor Company Of Japan, Ltd. pressing plant in Yokohama until 1988. Around 1995 the company was renamed to Mercury Music Entertainment Co. Ltd.)
- Remaster of Mercury 834683-2
- Kiyoshi Tokiwa (born 1936), (Note: Kiyoshi Tokiwa (born 1936 Sakai, Japan) is a Japanese jazz producer, editor, radio DJ, and liner notes author. He was editor of the Japanese jazz magazine, Swing Journal (de) (ISSN 0039-744X), from 1962 to 1979 and from 1990 to 1993.) digital remastering
- OCLC 21962968

== Personnel ==
Adapted from AllMusic.

- Georgie Auld – tenor saxophone
- Keter Betts – bass
- Jimmy Cobb – drums
- Maynard Ferguson – trumpet
- Tom Ferguson – trumpet
- Herb Geller – alto saxophone
- Conrad Gozzo – trumpet
- Al Hendrickson – guitar
- Arthur "Skeets" Herfurt – alto saxophone
- James Isaacs – liner notes
- Wynton Kelly – piano
- Tokiwa Kinoshita – digital remastering, remastering
- Manny Klein – trumpet
- Ray Linn – trumpet
- Hal Mooney – arranger, conductor
- Hal Mooney Orchestra – musician
- Ben Mundy – preparation for release
- Tom Pederson – trombone
- Cliff Preiss – preparation for release
- Frank Rosolino – trombone
- Babe Russin – tenor saxophone
- Bob Shad – producer
- Dinah Washington – vocals
- Si Zentner – trombone
