= What a Diff'rence a Day Makes! =

Studio album by Dinah Washington
- Released: 1959
- Recorded: 19 February – August 1959
- Genre: Vocal
- Length: 31:48
- Label: Mercury
- Producer: Clyde Otis

Dinah Washington chronology
Newport '58 (1958)	What a Diff'rence a Day Makes! (1959)	September in the Rain (1961)

Singles from What a Diff'rence a Day Makes!
- 1. "What a Diff'rence a Day Makes" Released: April 1959

Professional ratings
Review scores
Source	Rating
AllMmusic	5/5 stars
The Penguin Guide to Jazz Recordings	3/4 stars

What a Diff'rence a Day Makes! is a tenth studio album by Dinah Washington, arranged by Belford Hendricks, featuring her hit single of the same name.

The title track won Washington the Grammy Award for Best R&B Performance at the 2nd Annual Grammy Awards held in November 1959.

Album was released on CD in 2000 on the Verve label with three bonus tracks.

== Track listing ==
1. "I Remember You" (Johnny Mercer, Victor Schertzinger) – 2:42
2. "I Thought About You" (Jimmy Van Heusen, Johnny Mercer) – 2:28
3. "That's All There Is to That" (Clyde Otis, Kelly Owens) – 2:15
4. "I Won't Cry Anymore" (Al Frisch, Fred Wise) – 2:15
5. "I'm Thru with Love" (Gus Kahn, Fud Livingston, Matty Malneck) – 2:23
6. "Cry Me a River" (Arthur Hamilton) – 2:24
7. "What a Diff'rence a Day Makes" (Stanley Adams, María Mendez Grever) – 2:35
8. "Nothing in the World" (Brook Benton, Belford Hendricks, Clyde Otis) – 3:12
9. "Manhattan" (Richard Rodgers, Lorenz Hart) – 4:13
10. "Time after Time" (Sammy Cahn, Jule Styne) – 2:27
11. "It's Magic" (Sammy Cahn, Jule Styne) – 2:28
12. "A Sunday Kind of Love" (Barbara Belle, Anita Leonard, Louis Prima, Stan Rhodes) – 2:26
13. "Time after Time" (First Version) (Sammy Cahn, Jule Styne) - 2:15
14. "Come On Home" (Bonus) (Juanita Hill, Dinah Washington) - 2:27
15. "It Could Happen To You" (Bonus) (Jimmy Van Heusen, Johnny Burke) - 2:19

== Personnel ==
=== Performance ===
- Dinah Washington - vocals
- Charles Davis - baritone saxophone
- Jerome Richardson - flute
- Kenny Burrell - guitar
- David "Panama" Francis - drums
- Milt Hinton - double bass
- Joe Zawinul - piano
- Belford Hendricks - arranger, conductor

=== Production ===
- Tom Greenwood - research coordination
- Carlos Kase
- Hollis King - art direction
- Edward Odowd - design
- Sherniece Smith - art producer
- Chuck Stewart - photography
- George Piros - sound engineer
- Fine Recording Studios, New York City
