= Dinah Washington Sings Fats Waller =

Studio album by Dinah Washington
- Released: 1957
- Recorded: October 1, 2, 4, November 20, 1957
- Genre: Vocal jazz, blues, pop standards
- Length: 30:46
- Label: Emarcy, Verve (reissue)
- Producer: Bob Shad

Dinah Washington chronology
The Swingin' Miss "D" (1957)	Dinah Washington Sings Fats Waller (1957)	Music for a First Love (1957)

Professional ratings
Review scores
Source	Rating
Allmusic	4.5/5 stars
The Penguin Guide to Jazz Recordings	3/4 stars

Dinah Washington Sings Fats Waller is a seventh studio album by blues, R&B and jazz singer Dinah Washington released on the Emarcy label, and reissued by Verve Records in 1990 as The Fats Waller Songbook. In the album Washington covers 12 songs that have been penned or performed by jazz pianist, organist, singer and songwriter Fats Waller. Allmusic details the album in its review as saying: "Dinah Washington Sings Fats Waller appropriately brings together Waller's vivacious songs and Washington's demonstrative vocal talents. The jazz diva effortlessly handles Waller classics while turning in particularly emotive renditions. Adding nice variety to the already strong set, Washington's husband at the time, saxophonist Eddie Chamblee, joins the singer for playful duets on "Honeysuckle Rose" and "Everybody Loves My Baby".

== Track listing ==
1. "Christopher Columbus" (Chu Berry, Andy Razaf) – 2:45
2. "Tain't Nobody's Biz-ness if I Do" (Porter Grainger, Robert Graham Prince, Clarence Williams) – 3:25
3. "Jitterbug Waltz" (Fats Waller) – 2:45
4. "Someone's Rocking My Dreamboat" (Leon René, Emerson Scott) – 1:58
5. "Ain't Cha Glad?" (Fats Waller, Andy Razaf) – 2:43
6. "Squeeze Me" (Fats Waller, Clarence Williams) – 2:07
7. "Ain't Misbehavin''" (Fats Waller, Harry Brooks, Andy Razaf) – 2:32
8. "Black and Blue" (Fats Waller, Harry Brooks, Andy Razaf) – 2:55
9. "Everybody Loves My Baby" (Spencer Williams, Jack Palmer) – 2:36
10. "I've Got a Feeling I'm Falling" (Fats Waller, Harry Link, Billy Rose) – 2:23
11. "Honeysuckle Rose" (Fats Waller, Andy Razaf) – 2:33
12. "Keepin' Out of Mischief Now" (Fats Waller, Andy Razaf) – 2:34

== Personnel ==
- Dinah Washington – Lead Vocals
- Eddie Chamblee – Saxophone (Tenor), Vocals
- Benny Golson – Saxophone (Tenor)
- Hal McKusick – Saxophone (Alto)
- Sahib Shihab – Saxophone (Alto)
- Jerome Richardson – Flute, Saxophone (Alto)
- Frank Wess – Flute, Saxophone (Tenor)
- Jack Wilson – Piano
- Patti Bown – Piano
- Jimmy Cleveland – Trombone
- Rod Levitt – Trombone (Bass)
- Melba Liston – Trombone
- Julian Priester – Trombone
- Chauncey Welsch – Trombone
- Sonny Russo – Trombone
- Johnny Coles – Trumpet
- Ray Copeland – Trumpet
- Reunald Jones – Trumpet
- Joe Newman Quartet – Trumpet
- Ernie Royal – Trumpet
- Doc Severinsen – Trumpet
- Charlie Shavers – Trumpet
- Clark Terry – Trumpet
- Charles Davis – Saxophone (Baritone)
- Richard Evans – Bass
- Freddie Green – Guitar
- Wesley Landers – Percussion
- Sebastian Muro – Guitar
- Charlie Persip – Drums
- Ernie Wilkins – Arranger, Conductor
- Bob Shad – producer
