= Unforgettable (Nat King Cole song) =

1951 popular song

- Early-1950s sheet music

Single by Nat King Cole

from the album Unforgettable
- B-side: "My First and My Last Love" "Because of Rain" (UK)
- Released: October 1951
- Recorded: August 17, 1951
- Studio: Capitol, 5515 Melrose Ave, Hollywood
- Length: 3:13
- Label: Capitol
- Songwriter: Irving Gordon
- Producer: Lee Gillette

Nat King Cole singles chronology
"Because of Rain" (1951)	"Unforgettable" (1952)	"Pretend" (1953)

Dinah Washington singles chronology
"What a Diff'rence a Day Made" (1959)	"Unforgettable'" (1959)	"Baby (You've Got What It Takes)" (1960)

"Unforgettable"
Natalie Cole and Nat King Cole's "Unforgettable" duet from Unforgettable... with Love

"Unforgettable"
Nat King Cole's "Unforgettable"

"Unforgettable" is a popular song written by Irving Gordon. The song's original working title was "Uncomparable"; however, the music publishing company asked Gordon to change it to "Unforgettable". The song was published in 1951.

== Nat King Cole version ==
The most popular version of the song was recorded by Nat King Cole, in 1951, from his album, Unforgettable (1952), with an arrangement written by Nelson Riddle. A non-orchestrated version of the song, recorded in 1952, is one of the seven bonus tracks on Cole's 1998 CD reissue of 1955's otherwise completely instrumental album, Penthouse Serenade. On March 30, 1961, Nat King Cole recorded the tune anew, in a stereo version (with Ralph Carmichael and his Orchestra) of the Riddle arrangement, for the album The Nat King Cole Story (1961).

Cole's daughter, Natalie Cole, had been performing this duet using a recorded track in her live show through the 1980s. In 1991, after Elvis Presley's musical director Joe Guercio had the idea, Cole's original 1951 recording of the song was edited and reworked to create a duet with Natalie. The remixed version reached number 14 on the Hot 100, matching the peak position of the original version on the Billboard Best-Selling Pop Singles chart, and also number three on the Billboard Adult Contemporary chart. The song won three awards at the 34th Annual Grammy Awards (1992): Song of the Year, Record of the Year and Best Traditional Pop Vocal Performance.

Nat Cole's original recording was inducted into the Grammy Hall of Fame in 2000.

== Charts ==
Chart (1951–1952)	Peak position
US Billboard Best-Selling Pop Singles	14
US Billboard Best-Selling Sheet Music	15
US Billboard Records Most Played by Disk Jockeys	12

Chart (1988)	Peak position
UK Singles (Official Charts)	84

== Certifications ==
Region	Certification	Certified units/sales
United Kingdom (BPI)	Silver	200,000^{‡}
^{‡} Sales+streaming figures based on certification alone.

== Natalie Cole and Nat King Cole version ==
"Unforgettable"

Single by Natalie Cole with Nat King Cole

from the album Unforgettable... with Love
- B-side: "Cottage for Sale"
- Released: June 10, 1991
- Length: 3:29
- Label: Elektra
- Songwriter: Irving Gordon
- Producer: David Foster

Natalie Cole singles chronology
"Wild Women Do" (1990)	"Unforgettable" (1991)	"The Christmas Song" (1991)

Nat King Cole singles chronology
"When I Fall in Love" (1987)	"Unforgettable" (1991)	"The Christmas Song" (1991)

Audio
- "Unforgettable" on YouTube

American singer Natalie Cole included a cover of the song on her twelfth album, Unforgettable... with Love (1991). The song, produced by David Foster and reworked as a "virtual duet" with her father, Nat King Cole, reached number three on the US Billboard Adult Contemporary chart, number one on the Canadian RPM 40AC (Adult Contemporary) chart, and number two on the Australian Singles Chart. The performance of the song at the 1992 Grammy Awards was released on the 1994 album Grammy's Greatest Moments Volume I.

=== Critical reception ===
Billboard magazine commented, "Through the magic of digital technology father and daughter duet on this timeless song that swells with lush orchestration and moving harmonies."

=== Charts ===
==== Weekly charts ====
Chart (1991)	Peak position
Australia (ARIA)	2
Belgium (Ultratop 50 Flanders)	5
Canada Top Singles (RPM)	15
Canada Adult Contemporary (RPM)	1
Europe (Eurochart Hot 100)	40
Europe (European Hit Radio)	20
France (SNEP)	36
Germany (GfK)	78
Ireland (IRMA)	10
Luxembourg (Radio Luxembourg)	9
Netherlands (Dutch Top 40)	20
Netherlands (Single Top 100)	15
New Zealand (Recorded Music NZ)	7
UK Singles (Official Charts)	19
UK Airplay (Music Week)	17
US Billboard Hot 100	14
US Adult Contemporary (Billboard)	3
US Hot R&B/Hip-Hop Songs (Billboard)	10
US Cash Box Top 100	23

==== Year-end charts ====
Chart (1991)	Position
Australia (ARIA)	12
Belgium (Ultratop)	32
Canada Adult Contemporary (RPM)	2
New Zealand (RIANZ)	50
US Adult Contemporary (Billboard)	56
US (Joel Whitburn's Pop Annual)	119

=== Certifications and sales ===
Region	Certification	Certified units/sales
Australia (ARIA)	Gold	35,000^{^}
France	—	40,000
United States (RIAA)	Gold	500,000^{^}
United States (RIAA) Video single	Platinum	50,000^{^}
^{^} Shipments figures based on certification alone.

=== Release history ===
Region	Date	Format(s)	Label(s)	Ref.
United Kingdom	June 10, 1991	7-inch vinyl; 12-inch vinyl; CD	Elektra	
Australia	July 15, 1991	CD; cassette	Elektra	
Japan	July 25, 1991	Mini-CD	Elektra	

== Other cover versions ==
Semprini with Rhythm Acc. recorded it in London on March 26, 1952, as the third melody of the medley "Dancing to the piano (No. 14) – Part 1. Hit Medley of Foxtrots" along with "Slow Coach" and "Cry". It was released by EMI on the His Master's Voice label as catalog number B 10263.

Other cover versions were performed or recorded by:

- Acoustix (1998)
- George Benson – Inspiration (A Tribute to Nat King Cole) (2013)
- Andrea Bocelli and Lisa Kelly (2010)
- Captain & Tennille (2001)
- Roberto Carlos – Live at Jerusalem (2011)
- Vikki Carr (1997)
- Jackie Chan w/ Ani DiFranco (2002)
- Sammy Davis Jr. on his tribute album to Cole, who died in 1965, The Nat King Cole Songbook (1965)
- Roberta Flack – Set the Night to Music (1991)
- Aretha Franklin for her album Unforgettable: A Tribute to Dinah Washington (1964; 1976)
- Marvin Gaye (1965)
- Yvette Giraud (1953, in French under the title "Inoubliable")
- Earl Grant (1960)
- Merle Haggard (2004)
- Engelbert Humperdinck (1980)
- Bradley Joseph (2006)
- Teddi King – All the King's Songs (1959)
- Peggy Lee (1963)
- Leo Masliah of the disc Textualmente 1 (2001)
- Johnny Mathis (1983)
- Masaya Matsuura on his solo album "Beyooond!!!" (2013)
- Megan Mullally and Sean Hayes (2006) (Will & Grace finale as Jack McFarland and Karen Walker)
- Nicole C. Mullen (2018)
- Peter Nero (1997)
- Nianell and Dozi – It Takes Two (2009)
- Pepper Adams Quintet (1957)
- Oscar Peterson – Pastel Moods (1956) and With Respect to Nat (1965)
- Esther Phillips (1976)
- Lou Rawls (1977)
- Kenny Rogers (1998)
- Diane Schuur (1991)
- Marlena Shaw (1986)
- Sia – Finding Dory soundtrack (2016)
- Ricky Vallen (2009)
- Dinah Washington – Unforgettable (1959) (was inducted into the Grammy Hall of Fame in 2001)

== Sampled by song ==
- Nas on "Can't Forget About You" (2006)
