= Send Me to the 'Lectric Chair =

Blues song

Single by Bessie Smith
- B-side: "Them's Graveyard Words"
- Released: 1927
- Recorded: March 3, 1927
- Genre: Blues
- Length: 3:23
- Label: Columbia
- Songwriter: George Brooks

"Send Me to the 'Lectric Chair" is a late-1920s blues song written by composer George Brooks and made famous by Bessie Smith. In the song, a female narrator confesses the murder of a deceitful lover and expresses her willingness to accept her punishment. The song is notable for being among the selections officially banned from being played on radio by the British Broadcasting Corporation.

The song, both in its original rendition and in cover versions, has been included in numerous albums as well as live performances. Profiling a new volume of Smith's recordings, a reviewer comments, "Some of her most deservedly famous records are here ... as well as some that ought to be, like 'Send Me to the 'Lectric Chair"; another reviewer also singled out that as one of two particularly "terrific numbers" that made Bessie Smith: The Complete Recordings, Vol. 3 an improvement over the previous volumes.

== Additional recordings ==
Dinah Washington covered the song with "her own peculiar intensity," a reviewer notes in writing about the Washington biography Queen; "her recording ... can give a listener chills — especially when Dinah declares, with her strong, deliberate enunciation, 'Burn me, 'cause I don't care.' " A 1984 preview of a Philadelphia folk festival highlighted the song as an example of "Dave Bromberg's selection of musical esoterica" for his performances, while a critic listing his favorite death-penalty-themed tunes remarked that Bromberg's take, "in a neo-Dixieland style, even better captur[ed] its wicked humor." Bromberg continued performing the song well into the 21st century, with a 2011 concert review listing the song among "classic Bromberg faves." A reviewer praising a low-band radio station for its unusual programming noted "an inspired couple of hours of Prisoner [sic] songs, ranging from Lefty Frizzell's majestic, gothic tale of love and murder "Long Black Veil" to Bessie Smith's touching plea, 'Send Me to the 'Lectric Chair."

Tracy Nelson covered the song for her 1995 album I Feel So Good, in a performance that reviewer Paul Harris said "summons a perfectly Gothic essence of dread that few blues singers these days convincingly bring to the form." Harris interviewed the singer later that year for a piece that begins with a quote from the lyrics: "Judge, your honor, hear my plea / Before you open up your court / I don't want no sympathy / Because I cut my good man's throat," calling the verse a "dire lyric" that "recalls for us that the blues are, in essence, a gothic tradition." Nelson, whose rendition Harris called "satirical" and a Chicago Sun-Times reviewer called "surprisingly playful," dedicated the song on at least one occasion in 1996 to O. J. Simpson. Nelson's version also appeared on a 2001 Rounder Records compilation album of women blues singers, Any Woman's Blues, and in her 2003 live-performance album recorded at West Tennessee Detention Center, Live from Cell-Block D, leading one favorable reviewer to comment on the "temerity" of singing this song in a prison venue, chalking the choice up to "her fabled perversity."

In 2004, artist Eden Brent included the song as one of the tracks for her debut album Something Cool, in what a reviewer termed "notably a great go at 'Send Me to the 'lectric Chair'" in highlights of the covers on the release. Actor-singer Tyne Daly included "'Lectric Chair" in her 2010 musical live show "Songs"; reviewer David Wiegand called the performance "one of the highlights [in a] show with nothing but highlights," saying it was "suitably low-down without lapsing into a parody of the blues" and Richard Houdek characterized as "a brassy, no-regrets account."
