= William Harrington =

William Harrington may refer to:

- William J. Harrington, politician in Manitoba, Canada
- William F. Harrington (1920–1992), American biochemist
- William D. Harrington (1832–1904), Nova Scotia politician
- William Harrington (Irish cricketer) (1869–1940), Irish cricketer
- William Harrington (English cricketer) (1915–1988), English cricketer
- William Harrington (knight) (died 1440), English knight
- William Harrington (priest) (1566–1594), English Jesuit priest and Martyr
- William Harrington (MP) (died 1488), Member of Parliament for Lancashire
- William Harrington (artist) (born 1941), Irish artist
- Bill Harrington (broadcaster) (1926–1998), American sportscaster, children's television host, and news reporter
- Bill Harrington (baseball) (1927–2022), American baseball pitcher
- Bill Harrington (Australian footballer) (born 1942), Australian rules footballer for Footscray
- Bill Harrington (Irish footballer), Irish international footballer

== See also ==
- Billy Herrington (1969–2018), pornographic film actor and model
