= Unforgettable (Dinah Washington album) =

LP record by blues, R&B and jazz singer Dinah Washington

Studio album by Dinah Washington
- Released: 1961 (LP record, vinyl); 1991 (Compilation album)
- Recorded: August 1959, January 15, 1961
- Genre: Pop standards
- Length: 46:21 (Compilation album)
- Label: Mercury

Professional ratings
Review scores
Source	Rating
Allmusic	2/5 stars
The Penguin Guide to Jazz Recordings	3/4 stars

Unforgettable is the twelfth studio album LP record by blues, R&B and jazz singer Dinah Washington, released on the Mercury Records label, and reissued as a compilation album in 1991. The record shows the singer mostly in a pop star role instead of her traditional jazz & blues style. Allmusic reviews the compilation album as saying: "This CD (which has the original LP program of 12 songs joined by six others) finds Washington singing brief (mostly under three-minute) versions of standards in hopes of gaining another hit.". The single "Unforgettable", released in 1959, peaked at No. 10 on the Billboard 200 chart in 1961, and Dinah's recording of the song was inducted into the Grammy Hall of Fame in 2001.

== Track listing ==
1. "This Bitter Earth" (Clyde Otis) – 2:27
2. "I Understand" (Mabel Wayne, Kim Gannon) – 2:38
3. "This Love of Mine" (Sol Parker, Hank Sanicola, Frank Sinatra) – 2:39
4. "Alone" (Arthur Freed, Nacio Herb Brown) – 2:21
5. "Somewhere Along the Line" (Walter Merrick, Dinah Washington) – 2:39
6. "The Song Is Ended (But the Melody Lingers On)" (Irving Berlin) – 2:52
7. "Everybody Loves Somebody" (Sam Coslow, Irving Taylor, Ken Lane) – 2:26
8. "Ask a Woman Who Knows" (Victor Abrams) – 2:42
9. "A Man Only Does (What a Woman Makes Him Do)" (Clyde Otis, Kelly Owens) – 2:24
10. "A Bad Case of the Blues" (Clyde Otis) – 2:38
11. "When I Fall in Love" (Victor Young, Edward Heyman) – 2:33
12. "Unforgettable" (Irving Gordon) – 2:42

Additional tracks on 1991 compilation album

13. "Lingering" (Stell Adams, Dinah Washington) – 2:35
14. "Do You Want It That Way" (Billy Bowen, Dinah Washington) – 2:24
15. "Congratulations to Someone" (Roy Alfred, Andy Gibson) – 2:14
16. "I'm in Heaven Tonight" (Clyde Otis, Leroy Kirkland) – 2:31
17. "Love Is Here to Stay" (George Gershwin, Ira Gershwin) – 3:42
18. "Surprise Party" (Bob Hilliard, Walter Bishop, Sr.) – 1:54

== Personnel ==
=== Musicians ===
- Dinah Washington, vocals, arranger
- Belford Hendricks, arranger, conductor
- Nat Goodman, conductor
- Rene Hall, guitar
- Barney Kessel, guitar
- Ernie Freeman, piano
- Red Callender, bass
- Earl Palmer, drums

=== Production ===
- Lou Sidran – original liner notes
