= What a Diff'rence a Day Makes =

English version of song "Cuando vuelva a tu lado"

Single by Dinah Washington

from the album What a Diff'rence a Day Makes!
- B-side: "Come On Home"
- Released: 1959
- Recorded: 1959
- Genre: Pop, vocal jazz
- Length: 2:31
- Label: Mercury
- Songwriters: María Grever, Stanley Adams (English lyrics)

Dinah Washington singles chronology
"Make Me a Present of You" (1958)	"What a Diff'rence a Day Makes" (1959)	"Unforgettable" (1959)

"What a Diff'rence a Day Made", also recorded as "What a Difference a Day Makes", is a popular song originally written in Spanish by María Grever, a Mexican songwriter, in 1934 with the title "Cuando vuelva a tu lado" ("When I Return to Your Side") and first recorded by Orquesta Pedro Vía that same year. A popular version in Spanish was later recorded by trio Los Panchos with Eydie Gormé in 1964.

The song is also known in English as "What a Diff'rence a Day Makes", as popularized by Dinah Washington in 1959.

== English adaptation ==
The English lyrics were written by Stanley Adams, and this form of the song was played by Harry Roy & his Orchestra. It was published in late 1934. The most successful early recording, in 1934, was by the Dorsey Brothers, with vocals by Bob Crosby, although it was first recorded by Cleveland crooner Jimmy Ague.

== Dinah Washington version ==
Dinah Washington won a Grammy Award in 1959 for Best Rhythm and Blues Performance with this song. Her version was also inducted into the Grammy Hall of Fame in 1998. It also earned her first top ten pop hit, reaching number 8 on the Billboard Hot 100.

=== Charts ===
Chart (1959)	Peak position
US Billboard Hot 100	8
US Billboard Hot R&B Sides	4

== Esther Phillips version ==
"What a Diff'rence a Day Makes"

Single by Esther Phillips
- B-side: "Come On Home"
- Released: July 1975
- Recorded: 1975
- Genre: Disco • R&B • Soul
- Length: 3:12
- Label: Kudu
- Songwriters: María Grever, Stanley Adams (English lyrics)

In 1975, Esther Phillips recorded a disco version of the song. The Esther Phillips version became a big hit, reaching number twenty on the US Hot 100 and number 6 in the UK. It also reached number two on the disco charts. Her version also did well on the US soul chart, reaching the top ten. Phillips performed the song on the television comedy variety program Saturday Night Live during its first season.

=== Charts ===
Chart (1975)	Peak position
Australia (Kent Music Report)	38
US Billboard Hot 100	20
US Billboard Hot Soul Singles	10
U.S. Billboard Dance Club Songs	2
U.S. Billboard Easy Listening	33
UK Singles Chart	6

== Notable cover versions ==
- Andy Russell, a Mexican-American singer, recorded a bilingual version of the song in 1944 which reached number 15 on the Billboard Hot 100 chart.
- Vaughn Monroe's 1955 version reached number 60 in the US Music Vendor survey.
- Lucía Gutiérrez Rebolloso became the first Mexican jazz singer to win the Sarah Vaughan International Jazz Vocal Competition with an English and Spanish interpretation of "Cuando vuelva a tu lado/What a Difference a Day Makes".
