= September in the Rain =

Song
- Published: 1937 by Remick Music Corporation
- Genre: Traditional pop
- Composer: Harry Warren
- Lyricist: Al Dubin

"September in the Rain" is a popular song about nostalgia by Harry Warren and Al Dubin, published in 1937. The song was introduced by James Melton in the film Melody for Two. It has become a standard, having been recorded by many artists since, and featured in a variety of movies, including the 1937 film of the same name.

There were three charted versions in 1937 by Guy Lombardo, James Melton and Rhythm Wreckers (vocal by Pauline Byron).

The song also lends its name to a Dinah Washington album featuring her recorded version of the song.

== Recorded versions ==
- The song became popular again in 1948 and 1949 when versions by Sam Donahue and the George Shearing Quintet briefly reached the charts.
- On January 1, 1962, the Beatles recorded a rock and roll interpretation during their ultimately failed audition for Decca Records.
- Johnny Hartman, Erroll Garner (1949)
- Dorothy Ashby - Django/Misty (1984)
- Cilla Black
- Claude Bolling/Guy Marchand
- Teresa Brewer
- Dave Brubeck Octet - The Dave Brubeck Octet (1956)
- Chad & Jeremy - Yesterday's Gone (1964)
- June Christy - A Friendly Session, Vol. 3 (2000) with the Johnny Guarnieri Quintet, Cool Christy (2002)
- Eddie Condon (1944)
- Bing Crosby — Bing Sings Whilst Bregman Swings (1956)
- Doris Day - The Complete Standard Transcriptions (1952 recording)
- Sam Donahue (1948)
- Dorothy Donegan - Donnybrook with Donegan (1959)
- The Duprees - You Belong To Me (1962)
- Slim Gaillard (1946)
- Gossamer (Kwesi Boakye) - The Looney Tunes Show - "Monster Talent"
- Earl Grant - Bali Ha'i (1966)
- Lionel Hampton (1955)
- Roy Hargrove Big Band - Emergence (2009)
- Al Hibbler - Starring Al Hibbler (1956)>
- Jools Holland & Paul Weller (2012)
- Jack Hylton
- Harry James (Instrumental version)
- Jan Johansson
- Norah Jones from Marian McPartland's Piano Jazz (2003)
- Frankie Laine single release (1946) and for his album Reunion in Rhythm (1959)
- Brenda Lee for her album Bye Bye Blues (1966)
- Peggy Lee (1945)
- Annie Lennox - Nostalgia (2014)
- Guy Lombardo (US #1 1937)
- Julie London - Calendar Girl (1956)
- Mantovani (1937)
- Yehudi Menuhin
- Willie Nelson - Night and Day (1999)
- Red Norvo - Red Norvo with Tal Farlow & Charles Mingus (1997)
- Anita O'Day - This Is Hip (2006)
- The Platters from the album The Platters (1964)
- Sue Raney - Breathless (1997 Compilation) and Songs For A Raney Day (1960).
- Nelson Riddle - C'mon...Get Happy! (1957)
- Marty Robbins - The Essential Marty Robbins 1951-1982: Columbia Country Classics (1996)
- Royal Jokers (1957)
- Vic Schoen and His Orchestra (vocal: The Notables)
- Diane Schuur - Some Other Time (2008)
- George Shearing - September in the Rain (2000)
- Victor Silvester
- Frank Sinatra - Sinatra's Swingin' Session!!! (1961)
- Jeri Southern - The Dream's on Jeri (1998)
- Muggsy Spanier
- Jo Stafford - As You Desire Me (1954) and Love, Mystery and Adventure (2006)
- Dakota Staton - Ultimate Dakota Staton (2005)
- Rod Stewart - Fly Me to the Moon... The Great American Songbook Volume V (2010)
- Hank Thompson - Breakin' in Another Heart (1965)
- Arthur Tracy (1937)
- Sarah Vaughan - Sarah Vaughan At Mister Kelly's (1957)
- Dinah Washington - September in the Rain (1960)
- Joe Williams - Together/Have a Good Time (2006) (with Harry "Sweets" Edison)
- Lester Young (1953)
