= Back to the Blues (Dinah Washington album) =

Studio album by Dinah Washington
- Released: 1963
- Recorded: 1962
- Genre: Vocal jazz
- Length: 43:02
- Label: Roulette

Dinah Washington chronology
I Wanna Be Loved (1962)	Back to the Blues (1963)	Dinah '63 (1963)

Back to the Blues is a fifteenth studio album by Dinah Washington, arranged by Fred Norman.

== Reception ==
Professional ratings
Review scores
Source	Rating
AllMusic	4.5/5 stars
The Penguin Guide to Jazz Recordings	2.5/4 stars

AllMusic's Scott Yanow wrote that "after her unexpected success on the pop charts, most of Washington's sessions for Mercury and Roulette during the last four years of her life were quite commercial, with string arrangements better suited to country singers and Dinah nearly parodying herself with exaggerated gestures ... In general, this is a more successful date than Washington's earlier investigation of Bessie Smith material, since the backup band is more sympathetic and the talented singer is heard in prime form. Dinah Washington clearly had a real feeling for this bluesy material".

== Track listing ==
1. "The Blues Ain't Nothin' But a Woman Cryin' for Her Man" (J. Mayo Williams) – 3:46
2. "Romance in the Dark" (Lil Green) – 2:12
3. "You've Been a Good Old Wagon" (Perry Bradford) – 3:50
4. "Let Me Be the First to Know" (Leroy Kirkland, Dinah Washington, P. Woods) – 2:39
5. "How Long, How Long Blues" (Leroy Carr) – 4:58
6. "Don't Come Running Back to Me" (Johnson, Washington, Woods) – 2:23
7. "It's a Mean Old Man's World" (Kirkland, Washington) – 3:10
8. "Key to the Highway" (Big Bill Broonzy, Charlie Segar) – 2:39
9. "If I Never Get to Heaven" (Napp, Washington) – 3:44
10. "Duck Before You Drown" (Napp, Washington) – 2:11
11. "No Hard Feelings" (Jacobs, Al Roberts) – 2:33
12. "Nobody Knows the Way I Feel This Morning" (Pearl Delaney, Tom Delaney) – 8:40

== Personnel ==
- Dinah Washington – vocals
- Fred Norman – arranger: 1-6, 8-10, 12
- Don Costa - arranger: 7, 11
- Billy Butler – guitar
- Eddie Chamblee – tenor saxophone
- Illinois Jacquet
