= Dinah Washington =

American singer (1924–1963)

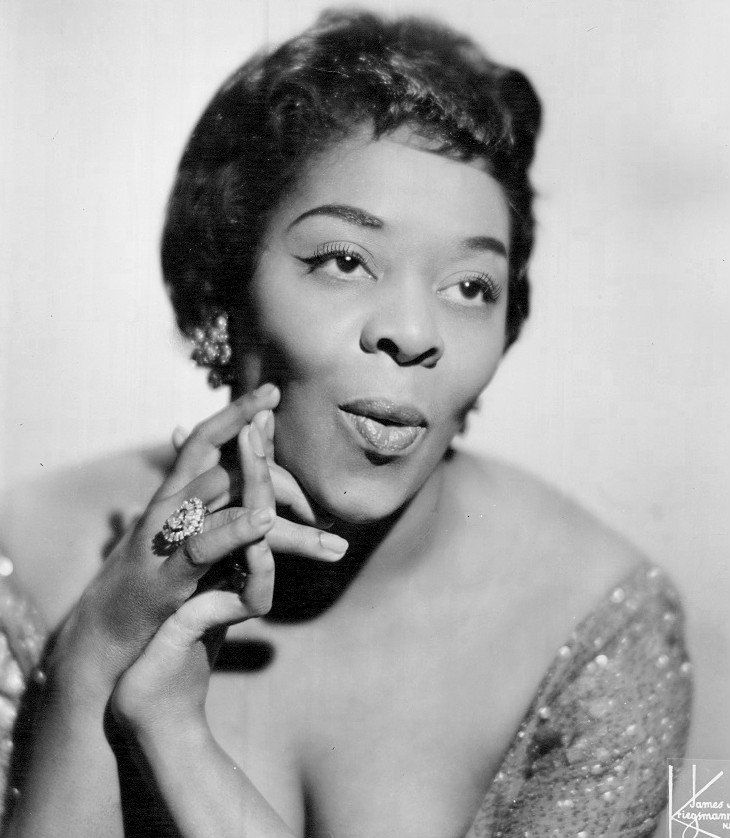
- Washington in 1962

Background information
- Born: Ruth Lee Jones; August 29, 1924; Tuscaloosa, Alabama, U.S.
- Died: December 14, 1963 (aged 39) Detroit, Michigan, U.S.
- Genres: Jazz; blues; R&B; gospel; traditional pop
- Occupations: Singer; songwriter
- Works: Discography
- Years active: 1941–1963
- Labels: Keynote; Mercury; EmArcy; Roulette

Dinah Washington (/ˈdaɪ.nə/ DY-nuh; born Ruth Lee Jones; August 29, 1924 – December 14, 1963) was an American singer, one of the most popular Black female recording artists of the 1950s. Primarily a jazz vocalist, she performed and recorded in a wide variety of styles, including blues, R&B, and traditional pop music, and gave herself the title of "Queen of the Blues". She was also known as "Queen of the Jukeboxes". She was a 1986 inductee of the Alabama Jazz Hall of Fame and was inducted into the Rock and Roll Hall of Fame in 1993.

== Early life ==
Ruth Lee Jones was born on August 29, 1924, in Tuscaloosa, Alabama, to Alice and Ollie Jones, and moved to Chicago as a child. She became deeply involved in gospel music and played piano for the choir in St. Luke's Baptist Church while still in elementary school. She sang gospel music in church and played piano, directing her church choir in her teens, and was a member of the Sallie Martin Gospel Singers. When she joined the Sallie Martin group, she dropped out of Wendell Phillips High School. She sang lead with the first female gospel singers formed by Sallie Martin, who was co-founder of the Gospel Singers Convention. Her involvement with the gospel choir occurred after she won an amateur contest at Chicago's Regal Theater where she sang "I Can't Face the Music".

== Career ==
=== Clubs ===
After winning a talent contest at the age of 15, she began performing in clubs. By 1941–42, she was performing in such Chicago clubs as Dave's Café and the Downbeat Room of the Sherman Hotel (with Fats Waller). She was playing at the Three Deuces, a jazz club, when a friend took her to hear Billie Holiday at the Garrick Stage Bar. Club owner Joe Sherman was so impressed with her singing of "I Understand", backed by the Cats and the Fiddle, who were appearing in the Garrick's upstairs room, that he hired her. During her year at the Garrick—she sang upstairs while Holiday performed in the downstairs room—she acquired the name Dinah Washington, by which she became known. She credited Joe Sherman with suggesting the change from Ruth Jones, made before Lionel Hampton came to hear her at the Garrick. Hampton's visit brought an offer, and Washington worked as his female band vocalist after she had sung with the band for its opening at Chicago's Regal Theater.

=== Early recordings ===
She made her recording debut for the Keynote label that December with "Evil Gal Blues", written by Leonard Feather and backed by Hampton and musicians from his band, including Joe Morris (trumpet) and Milt Buckner (piano). Both that record and its follow-up, "Salty Papa Blues", reached the Billboard Harlem Hit Parade chart in 1944. In December 1945, she made a series of 12 recordings for Apollo Records (10 of which were issued) featuring Lucky Thompson's All-Stars.

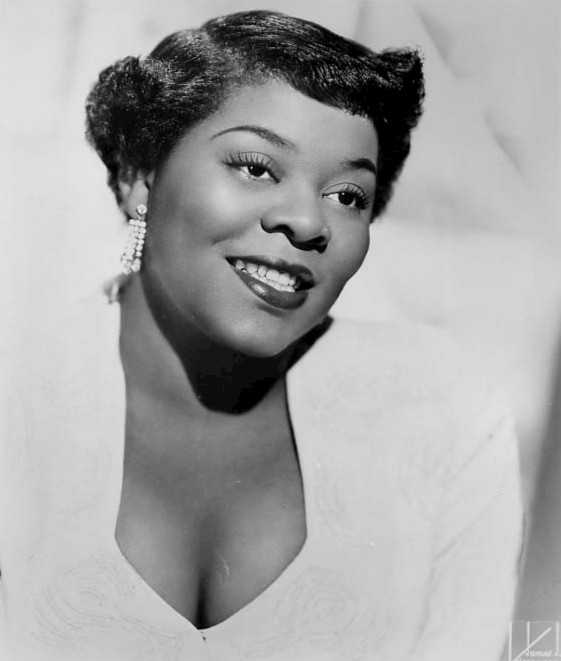
Washington for Billboard magazine, 1952

=== Solo recordings and hits ===
She stayed with Hampton's band until 1946, after the Keynote label folded, then signed for Mercury Records as a solo singer. Her first record for Mercury, a version of Fats Waller's "Ain't Misbehavin'", was another hit, starting a long string of success. Between 1948 and 1955, she had 27 R&B top-10 hits, making her one of the most popular and successful singers of the period. Both "Am I Asking Too Much" (1948) and "Baby Get Lost" (1949) reached Number 1 on the R&B chart, and her version of "I Wanna Be Loved" (1950) crossed over to reach Number 22 on the U.S. Pop Chart. Her hit recordings included blues, standards, novelties, pop covers, and even a version of Hank Williams's "Cold, Cold Heart" (R&B Number 3, 1951). At the same time as her biggest popular success, she also recorded sessions with many leading jazz musicians, including Clifford Brown and Clark Terry on the album Dinah Jams (1954), and also recorded with Cannonball Adderley and Ben Webster.

In 1950, Washington performed at the sixth Cavalcade of Jazz concert held at Wrigley Field in Los Angeles which was produced by Leon Hefflin Sr. on June 25. Also featured on the same day were Lionel Hampton, PeeWee Crayton's Orchestra, Roy Milton and his Orchestra, Tiny Davis and Her Hell Divers, and others. There were 16,000 reported to be in attendance, and the concert ended early because of a fracas while Hampton played "Flying High". Washington returned to perform at the twelfth Cavalcade of Jazz, also at Wrigley Field in Los Angeles, on September 2, 1956. Also performing that day were Little Richard, The Mel Williams Dots, Julie Stevens, Chuck Higgins's Orchestra, Bo Rhambo, Willie Hayden & Five Black Birds, The Premiers, Gerald Wilson and His 20-Pc. Recording Orchestra, and Jerry Gray and his Orchestra.

In 1959, she had her first top ten pop hit, with a version of "What a Diff'rence a Day Makes", which made Number 4 on the U.S. Pop Chart. Her band at that time included arranger and conductor Belford Hendricks, with Kenny Burrell (guitar), Joe Zawinul (piano), and Panama Francis (drums). She followed it up with a version of Irving Gordon's "Unforgettable", and then two highly successful duets in 1960 with Brook Benton, "Baby (You've Got What It Takes)" (No. 5 Pop, No. 1 R&B) and "A Rockin' Good Way (to Mess Around and Fall in Love)" (No. 7 Pop, No. 1 R&B). Her last big hit was "September in the Rain" in 1961 (No. 23 Pop, No. 5 R&B).

Washington notably performed two numbers in the dirty blues genre: "Long John Blues", about her dentist, with the lyrics "He took out his trusty drill. Told me to open wide. He said he wouldn't hurt me, but he filled my whole inside" and "Big Long Slidin' Thing", supposedly about a trombonist.

Washington was well known for singing torch songs. In 1962, she hired a male backing trio called the Allegros, consisting of Jimmy Thomas on drums, Earl Edwards on saxophone, and Jimmy Sigler on organ. Edwards was replaced on saxophone by John Payne. A Variety writer praised their vocals as "effective choruses".

One source states that Washington "produced 45 R&B-charted hits between 1948 and 1961, including 16 Top 15 placements between 1948 and 1950".

=== Appraisals and notable performances ===
In the 1950s and early 1960s, Washington occasionally performed on the Las Vegas Strip. Tony Bennett said of Washington during a recording session with Amy Winehouse:

She was a good friend of mine, you know. She was great. She used to just come in with two suitcases in Vegas without being booked ... And she'd stay as long as she wanted. And all the kids in all the shows on the Strip would come that night. They'd hear that she's in town and it would be packed just for her performance.

According to Richard S. Ginell at AllMusic:

[Washington] was at once one of the most beloved and controversial singers of the mid-20th century – beloved to her fans, devotees, and fellow singers; controversial to critics who still accuse her of selling out her art to commerce and bad taste. Her principal sin, apparently, was to cultivate a distinctive vocal style that was at home in all kinds of music, be it R&B, blues, jazz, middle of the road pop – and she probably would have made a fine gospel or country singer had she the time. Hers was a gritty, salty, high-pitched voice, marked by absolute clarity of diction and clipped, bluesy phrasing.

Washington's achievements included appearances at the Newport Jazz Festival (1955–1959), the Randalls Island Jazz Festival in New York City (1959), and the International Jazz Festival in Washington, D.C. (1962); frequent gigs at Birdland (1958, 1961–1962); and performances in 1963 with Count Basie and Duke Ellington.

== Personal life and death ==
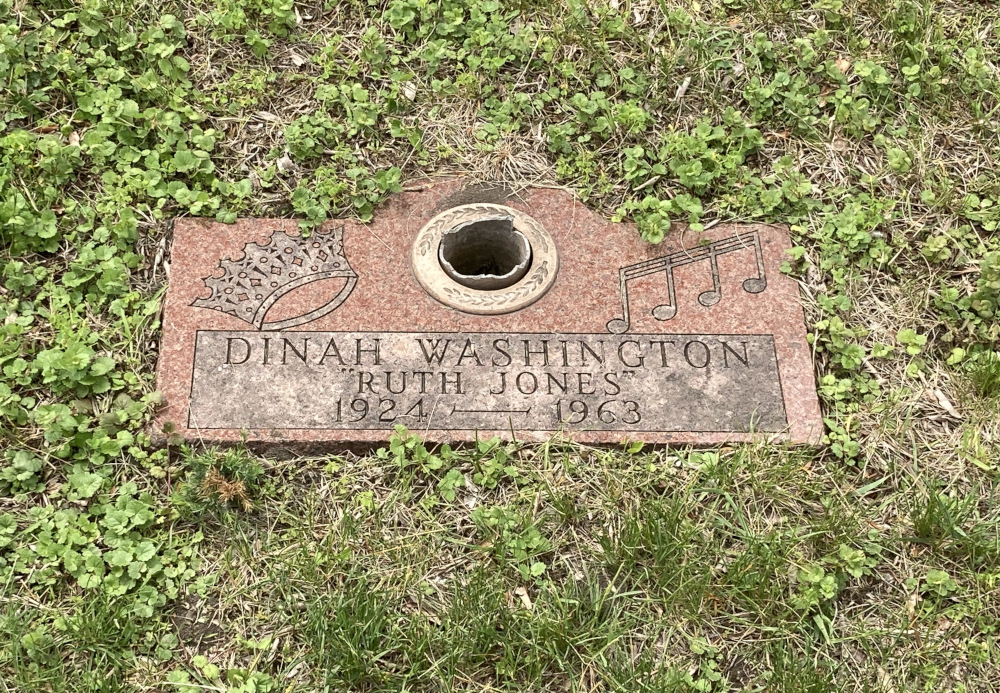
Washington's grave at Burr Oak Cemetery

The number of times Washington was married is unclear. While she is often reported to have been married seven times, some sources report six, eight, or nine husbands.

Early in the morning of December 14, 1963, Washington's last husband, football player Dick "Night Train" Lane, went to sleep with Washington and awoke later to find her slumped over and not responsive. Dr. B. C. Ross pronounced her dead at the scene at age 39. An autopsy later showed a lethal combination of secobarbital and amobarbital, prescriptions for her insomnia and diet, which contributed to her death. A memorial service was held at New Betel Baptist Church. She is buried in Burr Oak Cemetery in Alsip, Illinois.

== Awards ==
=== Grammy Awards ===
Year	Category	Title	Genre
1960	Best Rhythm & Blues Performance	"What a Diff'rence a Day Makes"	R&B

=== Grammy Hall of Fame ===
Recordings by Washington were inducted into the Grammy Hall of Fame, a special Grammy Award established in 1973 to honor recordings that are at least 25 years old and that have "qualitative or historical significance".

Year	Title	Genre	Label	Year Inducted
1959	"Unforgettable"	Pop (single)	Mercury	2001
1954	"Teach Me Tonight"	R&B (single)	Mercury	1999
1959	"What a Diff'rence a Day Makes"	Traditional pop (single)	Mercury	1998

=== Rock and Roll Hall of Fame ===
The Rock and Roll Hall of Fame listed her "TV Is the Thing (This Year)" as one of the songs that shaped rock and roll.

Year	Title	Genre
1953	"TV Is the Thing (This Year)"	R&B

=== Honors and Inductions ===
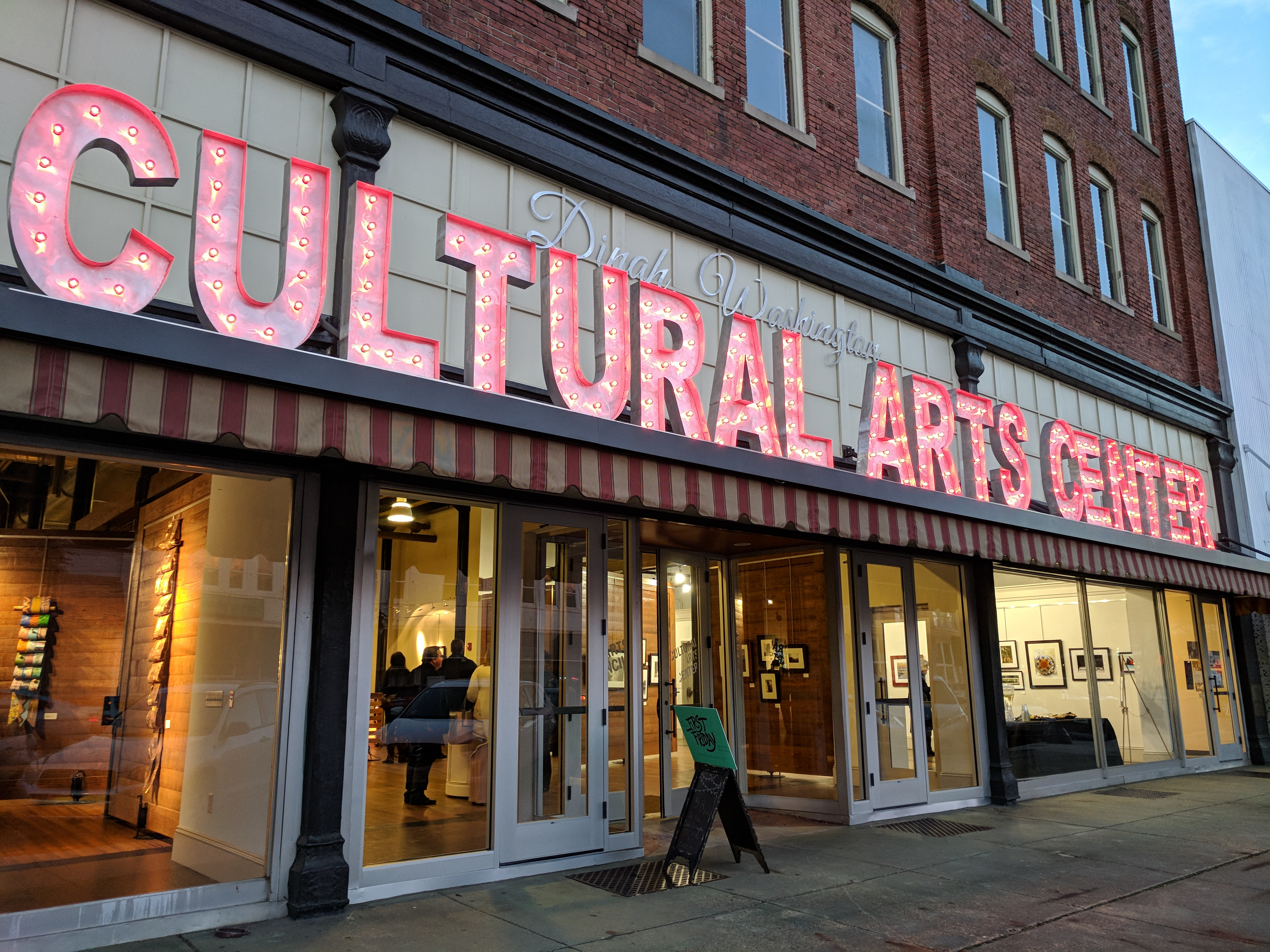
- The Dinah Washington Cultural Arts Center in Tuscaloosa, Alabama
  Unforgettable: A Tribute to Dinah Washington, a 1964 album recorded by Aretha Franklin as a tribute
- In 1993, the U.S. Post Office issued a 29-cent commemorative postage stamp of Washington.
- In 2005, the Board of Commissioners renamed a park, near where Washington had lived in Chicago in the 1950s, Dinah Washington Park in her honor.
- In 2008, the city of Tuscaloosa, Alabama, Washington's birthplace, renamed the section of 30th Avenue between 15th Street and Kaulton Park "Dinah Washington Avenue". The unveiling ceremony for the new name took place on March 12, 2009, with Washington's son Robert Grayson and three of her grandchildren in attendance.
- On August 29, 2013, the city of Tuscaloosa also dedicated the former Allen Jemison Hardware building, on the northwest corner of Greensboro Avenue and 7th Street (620 Greensboro Avenue), as the newly renovated Dinah Washington Cultural Arts Center."

Year	Title	Result	Notes
2020	National Rhythm & Blues Hall of Fame	Inducted	Early influence
1993	Rock and Roll Hall of Fame	Inducted	Early influences
1984	Big Band and Jazz Hall of Fame	Inducted	

== Album discography ==
- After Hours with Miss "D" (1954)
- Dinah Jams (1955)
- For Those in Love (1955)
- Dinah! (1956)
- In the Land of Hi-Fi (1956)
- The Swingin' Miss "D" (1957)
- Dinah Washington Sings Fats Waller (1957)
- Dinah Sings Bessie Smith (1958)
- Newport '58 (1958)
- What a Diff'rence a Day Makes! (1959)
- September In The Rain (1960)
- Unforgettable (1961)
- September in the Rain (1961)
- Drinking Again (1962)
- Tears and Laughter (1962)
- Back to the Blues (1963)
- Dinah '63 (1963)
- Late, Late Show (1963)
- A Stranger on Earth (1964)

== See also ==
- List of people from Harlem
