= 1958 in music =

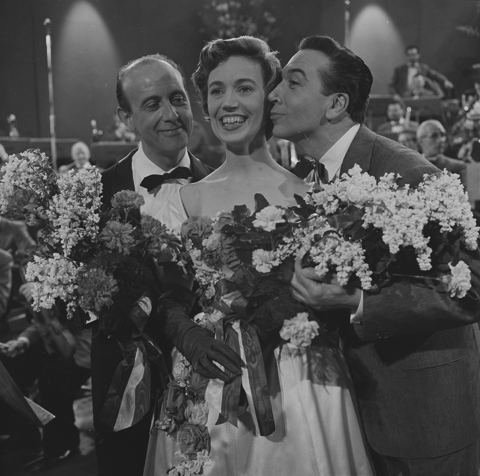
André Claveau (right) wins at Eurovision 1958

This is a list of notable events in music that took place in the year 1958.

== Specific locations ==
- 1958 in British music
- 1958 in Norwegian music

== Specific genres ==
- 1958 in country music
- 1958 in jazz

== Events ==
- January – Maria Callas, opening the Rome Opera House season with Norma with Italy's president, Giovanni Gronchi, in the audience, cancels after the first act because of voice problems. Anita Cerquetti assumes the role in Rome while simultaneously singing Norma in Naples, to great acclaim.
- January 24 – Paul McCartney makes his first appearance at The Cavern Club in Liverpool with The Quarrymen.
- February – 45,000 people in one week watch performances of "rokabirī" music by Japanese singers at the first Nichigeki Western Carnival.
- February 14 – The Iranian government bans rock & roll, claiming that this form of music is against the concepts of Islam and is a health hazard. Iranian doctors warn of the risk of injuries to the hips from the "extreme gyrations" of rock & roll dances.
- February 19 – In the United States:
  - Singer-songwriter Carl Perkins leaves Sun Records and moves to Columbia Records.
  - Motown releases its first record, "Got a Job" by Smokey Robinson and The Miracles.
- March 5 – Spanish guitarist Andrés Segovia premieres Fantasía para un gentilhombre (Fantasia for a Gentleman) by composer Joaquín Rodrigo at the San Francisco Symphony conducted by Enrique Jordá.
- March 12
  - Billie Holiday is given a year's probation by a Philadelphia court following her arrest and guilty plea on narcotics possession charges in 1956.
  - In Hilversum, Netherlands, "Dors, mon amour" sung by André Claveau (music by Pierre Delanoë, lyrics by Hubert Giraud) wins the third annual Eurovision Song Contest for France. Domenico Modugno places third for Italy with "Nel blu, dipinto di blu" which, retitled "Volare", will reach No. 1 in the US Billboard Hot 100, and will win two Grammy Awards next year for Record of the Year and Song of the Year for 1958.
- March 24 – Elvis Presley enters the U.S. Army.
- April 10 – English singer Cleo Laine marries bandleader John Dankworth.
- May 30 – Béla Bartók's Violin Concerto No. 1 is premiered in Basel, 50 years after it was composed
- c. July 12 – The Quarrymen (Paul McCartney, John Lennon (lead vocals), George Harrison, Colin Hanton (drums) and John Lowe (piano)) record a single 78 rpm shellac acetate disc at Phillips' Sound Recording Services in Liverpool: "In Spite of All the Danger" (McCartney–Harrison) and a cover of Buddy Holly's "That'll Be the Day".
- August 4 – Billboard magazine in the United States launches its "Hot 100" singles chart, with Ricky Nelson's "Poor Little Fool" as the #1 record.
- September 24 – Italian singers Natalino Otto and Flo Sandon's scout the young, talented Mina
- November 6 – Maria Callas is dismissed from the Metropolitan Opera in New York City by its general manager, Rudolf Bing.
- The Festival dei Due Mondi is founded by Gian Carlo Menotti.
- Kenny Rogers signs his first recording contract with a major record label and makes his first national TV performance on American Bandstand.
- Marvin Gaye begins recording with his first group.
- Otis Williams & the Distants begin their musical career. They will later join with The Primes and become The Temptations.
- Phil Spector begins his recording career.
- Dalida receives the Music Hall "Bravos" along with Yves Montand.
- RCA introduces its first stereo LPs.
- The major record labels begin to cease production of 78 rpm records.
- Fred Foster opens Monument Records in Hendersonville, Tennessee.
- Singer Ernesto Bonino leaves the United States and returns to Italy.
- Bob Bogle and Don Wilson founded the #1 instrumental group of all time The Ventures.
- Singer Júnior joins the pioneering Spanish electric guitar group Jump.
- The Country Music Association (CMA) is founded as the first trade association dedicated to a single music genre.

== Albums released ==
- Andy Williams – Andy Williams
- Andy Williams Sings Rodgers and Hammerstein – Andy Williams
- Anita Sings the Winners – Anita O'Day
- Around the World – Bing Crosby
- As Long As There's Music – Eddie Fisher
- Ascenseur pour l'échafaud (soundtrack) – Miles Davis
- The Atomic Mr. Basie – Count Basie
- Bo Diddley – Bo Diddley
- Buddy Holly – Buddy Holly
- Breezin' Along – The Four Lads
- C'est ça – Charles Aznavour
- Chicago Musette – John Serry and His Accordion – John Serry Sr. (in French)
- Closer Than a Kiss – Vic Damone
- Cole Español – Nat King Cole
- Come Fly with Me – Frank Sinatra
- Destination Moon – The Ames Brothers
- Dream – The Mills Brothers
- Ella Fitzgerald and Billie Holiday at Newport – Ella Fitzgerald and Billie Holiday
- Ella Fitzgerald Sings the Irving Berlin Songbook – Ella Fitzgerald
- Ella Swings Lightly – Ella Fitzgerald
- Ellington Indigos – Duke Ellington
- Elvis' Golden Records – Elvis Presley
- The Everly Brothers – The Everly Brothers
- The Fabulous Johnny Cash – Johnny Cash
- Fancy Meeting You Here – Bing Crosby and Rosemary Clooney
- For Musicians Only – Stan Getz
- For Teenagers In Love – Teresa Brewer
- Foreign Affair – Frankie Laine and Michel LeGrand
- Frank Sinatra Sings for Only the Lonely – Frank Sinatra
- Freedom Suite – Sonny Rollins
- Give Him the Ooh-La-La – Blossom Dearie
- Gogi Grant – Welcome To My Heart – Gogi Grant
- Gondolier – Dalida
- Greatest Hits – Frankie Laine
- A Guy in Love – Guy Mitchell
- Have 'Twangy' Guitar Will Travel – Duane Eddy (debut)
- He's So Fine – Jackie Wilson
- Hooray for Hollywood – Doris Day
- John Coltrane with the Red Garland Trio – John Coltrane
- Johnny Horton Sings Free And Easy – Johnny Horton
- Johnny's Greatest Hits – Johnny Mathis
- Julie Is Her Name, Volume II – Julie London
- Kate Smith Sings Folk Songs – Kate Smith
- King Creole (OST) – Elvis Presley
- King of Suriname – Ramdew Chaitoe
- The Kingston Trio – The Kingston Trio
- Last Night When We Were Young – Art Farmer
- Les Gitans – Dalida
- London by Night – Julie London
- Milestones – Miles Davis
- The Mills Brothers In Hi-Fi – The Mills Brothers
- The Mills Brothers Sing – The Mills Brothers
- Miss Music – Teresa Brewer
- Mmmm, The Mills Brothers – The Mills Brothers
- Music! Music! Music! – Teresa Brewer
- My Happiness – Connie Francis
- No Count Sarah – Sarah Vaughan
- One Dozen Berrys – Chuck Berry
- Our Gal Sal – Sally Starr (with The Comets)
- Paris Holiday – Bing Crosby
- Rhonda – Rhonda Fleming
- Ricky Nelson – Ricky Nelson
- Rockin' Around the World – Bill Haley & His Comets
- Rockin' the Joint – Bill Haley & His Comets
- Rockin' With Kay Starr – Kay Starr
- Salut les copains – Gilbert Bécaud
- Saturday Night with Mr. C – Perry Como
- Sings the Songs That Made Him Famous – Johnny Cash
- Smoochin' Time – The Ames Brothers
- Some Pleasant Moments In The 20th Century – Oscar Levant
- Songs I Wish I Had Sung – Bing Crosby
- Songs Our Daddy Taught Us – Everly Brothers
- South Pacific – Original soundtrack
- Star Dust – Pat Boone
- Surprise Package – The Crew Cuts
- Swingin' Down Broadway – Jo Stafford
- Teresa – Teresa Brewer
- Teresa Brewer At Christmas Time – Teresa Brewer
- Them There Eyes – Kay Starr
- This Is Sinatra Volume 2 – Frank Sinatra
- 'Til Morning – Johnnie Ray
- Time For Teresa – Teresa Brewer
- Torchin' – Frankie Laine
- Tormé – Mel Tormé
- Wheelin' & Dealin' – Mal Waldron, John Coltrane and Frank Wess
- When You Come to the End of the Day – Perry Como
- Who's Sorry Now? – Connie Francis
- Yes Indeed! – Pat Boone

== Biggest hit singles ==
The following songs achieved the highest chart positions in the charts for the longest time in 1958, in their respective countries.

#	Artist	Title	Year	Country	Chart Entries
1	Domenico Modugno	Volare	1958	(Italy)	US BB 1 – Aug 1958, US CashBox 1 of 1958, Italy 1 of 1958, Australia 1 for 5 weeks Mar 1958, Grammy in 1958, Canada 2 – Jul 1958, Norway 2 – Oct 1958, South Africa 5 of 1958, Australia 6 of 1958, UK 10 – Sep 1958, RYM 29 of 1958, Europe 34 of the 1950s, DDD 56 of 1958
2	The Kingston Trio	Tom Dooley	1958	(United States)	US BB 1 – Oct 1958, Canada 1 – Oct 1958, Norway 1 – Jan 1959, Australia 1 for 10 weeks May 1958, UK 5 – Nov 1958, Australia 5 of 1958, Italy 5 of 1959, South Africa 8 of 1958, Europe 18 of the 1950s, US CashBox 20 of 1958, US BB 37 of 1958, POP 37 of 1958, RYM 89 of 1958, DDD 94 of 1958, RIAA 197, Acclaimed 1001
3	The Everly Brothers	All I Have to Do is Dream	1958	(United States)	UK 1 – May 1958 (7 weeks at No.1), US Billboard 1 – Apr 1958 (17 weeks), Canada 1 – Apr 1958 (15 weeks), Record Mirror 1 for 9 weeks – Jun 1958, South Africa 1 of 1958, Grammy Hall of Fame in 2004 (1958), US BB 2 of 1958, US CashBox 4 of 1958, Your Hit Parade 4 of 1958, DDD 14 of 1958, US invalid BB 26 of 1958, POP 26 of 1958, Europe 28 of the 1950s (1958), UKMIX 45, nuTsie 89 of 1950s, DMDB 98 (1958), Rolling Stone 141, Acclaimed 160 (1958), RYM 5 of 1958, NY Daily Love list 13, one of the Rock and Roll Hall of Fame 500
4	The Everly Brothers	Bird Dog	1958	(United States)	Canada 1 – Aug 1958 (13 weeks), Record Mirror 1 for 3 weeks – Nov 1958, Australia 1 for 3 weeks – Oct 1958, UK 2 – Sep 1958 (16 weeks), US Billboard 2 – Aug 1958 (18 weeks), Australia 2 of 1958, US CashBox 5 of 1958, Your Hit Parade 5 of 1958, Norway 5 – Oct 1965 (3 weeks), Flanders 12 – Dec 1958 (3 months), US BB 13 of 1958, US invalid BB 25 of 1958, POP 25 of 1958, Europe 33 of the 1950s (1958), DDD 35 of 1958, D.Marsh 40 of 1958, Italy 88 of 1959, UKMIX 341, Acclaimed 1925 (1958), RYM 30 of 1958

== Top Hits on record ==
- "All I Have To Do Is Dream" – The Everly Brothers
- "Are You Sincere?" – Andy Williams
- "Believe What You Say" – Ricky Nelson
- "Big Man" – The Four Preps
- "Billy" – Kathy Linden
- "Bird Dog" – Everly Brothers
- "Blast Off" – The Tyrones
- "Blue Boy" – Jim Reeves
- "Born Too Late" – The Poni-Tails
- "Breathless" – Jerry Lee Lewis
- "Broke Down Baby" – The Tyrones
- "Cannonball" – Duane Eddy
- "Catch a Falling Star" – Perry Como
- "Come Dance With Me" – Frank Sinatra
- "Come On Let's Go" – Ritchie Valens
- "Come prima" ("Tu me donnes") – Dalida
- "DeDe Dinah" – Frankie Avalon
- "Everybody Loves A Lover" – Doris Day
- "Dans le bleu du ciel bleu" – Dalida
- "The Day the Rains Came" – Jane Morgan
- "El Diablo" – Frankie Laine
- "Don't" – Elvis Presley
- "Fallin'" – Connie Francis
- "Fever" – Peggy Lee
- "For Your Love" – Ed Townsend
- "Get a Job" – The Silhouettes
- "Got a Job" – Smokey Robinson and The Miracles
- "Ginger Bread" – Frankie Avalon
- "Gondolier" – Dalida
- "Great Balls Of Fire" – Jerry Lee Lewis
- "Guitare et tambourin" – Dalida
- "Hard Headed Woman" – Elvis Presley
- "Hava Nagila" – Dalida
- "The Hawaiian Wedding Song" – Andy Williams
- "Heartbeat" – Buddy Holly
- "He's Got the Whole World in His Hands" – Laurie London
- "High Class Baby" – Cliff Richard and The Drifters
- "Hoots Mon" – Lord Rockingham's XI
- "I am a Mole and I Live in a Hole" – The Southlanders
- "I Can't Stop Loving You" – Don Gibson (B-side to "Oh, Lonesome Me")
- "It's All in the Game" – Tommy Edwards
- "I Got a Feeling" – Ricky Nelson
- "I Have To Cry" – Frankie Laine
- "I Met Him On A Sunday" – The Shirelles
- "I Wonder Why" – Dion & the Belmonts
- "I'll Get By" – Connie Francis
- "I'll Wait for You" – Frankie Avalon
- "I'm Not Just Anybody's Baby" – Mindy Carson
- "I'm Shook" – The Tyrones
- "I'm Sorry I Made You Cry" – Connie Francis
- "It's Only Make Believe" – Conway Twitty
- "Journey's End" – Frankie Laine
- "Johnny B. Goode" – Chuck Berry
- "King Creole" – Elvis Presley
- "Kisses Sweeter Than Wine" – Jimmie Rodgers
- "Lazy Mary (Luna Mezzo Mare) – Lou Monte
- "Le jour où la pluie viendra" – Dalida
- "Left Right Out Of Your Heart" – Patti Page
- "Les Gitans" – Dalida
- "Little Star" – The Elegants
- "Lollipop" – The Chordettes
- "Looking Back" – Nat King Cole
- "Maybe" – The Chantels
- "Maybe Baby" – Buddy Holly
- "Mexican Hat Rock" – Dave Appell/The Applejacks
- "Milord" – Édith Piaf
- "Move It" – Cliff Richard and The Drifters (Original B-side to "Schoolboy Crush")
- "My Bucket's Got a Hole in It" – Ricky Nelson
- "My Happiness" – Connie Francis
- "Nobody but You" - Dee Clark
- "No One Knows" – Dion and the Belmonts
- "Oh Julie" – The Crescendos
- "Oh, Lonesome Me" – Don Gibson
- "One Summer Night" – Danleers
- "Partners" – Jim Reeves
- "Patricia" – Perez Prado
- "Poor Little Fool" – Ricky Nelson
- "Promise Me, Love" – Andy Williams
- "Queen of the Hop" – Bobby Darin
- "Ramrod" – Duane Eddy
- "Rave On" – Buddy Holly
- "Rawhide" – Frankie Laine
- "Return To Me (Ritorna A Me)" – Dean Martin
- "Rock and Roll Is Here to Stay" – Danny & the Juniors
- "Rocka-Conga" – Dave Appell/The Applejacks
- "Rockin' Around the Christmas Tree" – Brenda Lee
- "Rockin' Robin" – Bobby Day
- "Rumble" – Link Wray, early feedback, only instrumental ever banned
- "Scarlet Ribbons" – The Kingston Trio
- "Schoolboy Crush" – Cliff Richard and The Drifters (B-side to "Move It") (Original A-side to "Move It")
- "Short Shorts" – The Royal Teens
- "Smoke Gets In Your Eyes" – The Platters
- "Stupid Cupid" – Connie Francis
- "Sugartime" – The McGuire Sisters
- "Summertime Blues" – Eddie Cochran
- "Sweet Little Sixteen" – Chuck Berry
- "Teacher's Pet" – Doris Day
- "Tequila" – The Champs
- "The Chipmunk Song (Christmas Don't Be Late)" – The Chipmunks with David Seville
- "The Happy Organ – Dave "Baby" Cortez
- "The Purple People Eater" – Sheb Wooley
- "To Know Him is to Love Him" – The Teddy Bears
- "Tom Dooley" – The Kingston Trio
- "Twilight Time" – The Platters
- "Volare (Nel blu dipinto di blu)" – Domenico Modugno
- "The Walk" – Jimmy McCracklin
- "Well All Right" – Buddy Holly
- "Western Movies" – The Olympics
- "What Am I Living For" – Chuck Willis
- "When" – The Kalin Twins
- "Who's Sorry Now?" – Connie Francis
- "Why Don't They Understand" – George Hamilton IV
- "Witch Doctor" – Dave Seville
- "A Wonderful Time Up There" – Pat Boone
- "Yakety Yak" – The Coasters
- "You Always Hurt the One You Love" – Connie Francis
- "Zorro" - The Chordettes

== Published popular music ==
- "16 Candles" w.m. Luther Dixon & Allyson R. Khent
- "All I Have to Do is Dream" w.m. Felice and Boudleaux Bryant
- "Am I That Easy to Forget" w.m. Carl Belew, W. S. Stevenson & Shelby Singleton
- "Any Way The Wind Blows" w.m. William Dunham, Joseph Hooven & Marilyn Hooven
- "Are You Really Mine?" w.m. Al Hoffman, Dick Manning & Mark Markwell
- "A Big Hunk O' Love" w.m. Aaron Schroeder & Sid Wyche
- "Bird Dog" w.m. Felice and Boudleaux Bryant
- "Broken Hearted Melody" w. Hal David m. Sherman Edwards
- "A Certain Smile" w. Paul Francis Webster m. Sammy Fain
- "Chantilly Lace" w.m. Jiles Perry Richardson
- "C'mon Everybody" w.m. Eddie Cochran & Jerry Capeheart
- "Devoted to You" w.m. Felice and Boudleaux Bryant
- "Do You Want to Dance" w.m. Bobby Freeman
- "Donna" w.m. Ritchie Valens
- "Don't" w.m. Jerry Leiber & Mike Stoller
- "Enchanted Island" w. Al Stillman m. Robert Allen
- "Everybody Loves a Lover" w. Richard Adler m. Robert Allen
- "French Foreign Legion" w. Aaron Schroeder m. Guy Wood
- "Hoots Mon" Harry Robertson
- "If I Had A Hammer" w.m. Pete Seeger & Lee Hays
- "It's Only Make Believe" w.m. Conway Twitty & Jack Nance
- "Johnny B. Goode" w.m. Chuck Berry
- "Kewpie Doll" w.m. Sid Tepper & Roy C. Bennett
- "Kumbayah" recorded by Joe Hickerson and by Pete Seeger
- "Left Right Out Of Your Heart" w. Earl Shuman m. Mort Garson
- "The Little Serenade" w.m. Antonio Amurri, Paolo Esposito, Geoffrey C. Parsons & James J. T. Phillips
- "Little Star" w.m. Vito Picone & Arthur Venosa
- "Make Me A Miracle" Al Hoffman, Dick Manning, Mark Markwell
- "Maybe Baby" w.m. Norman Petty & Charles Hardin
- "Moon Talk" w.m. Al Hoffman & Dick Manning
- "My True Love" w.m. Jack Scott
- "Oh-Oh, I'm Falling In Love Again" w.m. Al Hoffman, Dick Manning & Mark Markwell
- "Once Upon A Summertime" (Original title "La Valse des Lilas") Eddie Barclay, Michel Legrand, Eddy Marnay, Johnny Mercer
- "Padre" w. (Eng) Paul Francis Webster (Fr) Marcel Algeron & Jacques Larue m. Alain C. Romans
- "Patricia" w. Bob Marcus m. Perez Prado
- "Peter Gunn" m. Henry Mancini
- "Poor Little Fool" w.m. Shari Sheeley
- "The Purple People Eater" w.m. Sheb Wooley
- "Raining In My Heart" w.m. Felice and Boudleaux Bryant
- "Rave On!" w.m. Norman Petty, Bill Tilghman & Sunny West
- "Rawhide" w. Ned Washington m. Dimitri Tiomkin. Title tune of the TV series performed by Frankie Laine.
- "Secretly" w.m. Al Hoffman, Dick Manning & Mark Markwell
- "Splish Splash" w.m. Bobby Darin & Jean Murray
- "Stupid Cupid" w. Howard Greenfield m. Neil Sedaka
- "Sugartime" w.m. Charlie Phillips & Odis Echols
- "Summertime Blues" Eddie Cochran, J. Capehart
- "Sweet Little Sixteen" w.m. Chuck Berry
- "Tears On My Pillow" w.m. Sylvester Bradford & Al Lewis
- "Tequila" w.m. Chuck Rio
- "There's Only One Of You" w. Al Stillman m. Robert Allen
- "Tom Dooley" trad arr. Dave Guard
- "Volare" w. (Eng) Mitchell Parish (Ital) Domenico Modugno & Franco Migliacci m. Domenico Modugno
- "We Belong Together", S. Weiss, Robert Carr, Johnny Mitchell
- "When" w.m. Jack Reardon & Paul Evans
- "Witch Doctor" w.m. Ross Bagdasarian
- "Yakety Yak" w.m. Jerry Leiber & Mike Stoller
- "You Are My Destiny" w.m. Paul Anka
- "Young and Warm and Wonderful" w. Hy Zaret m. Lou Singer

== Other notable songs ==
- "The Bells of Rhymney" by Pete Seeger and Idris Davies
- "Devojko mala" w. B. Timotijević m. D. Kraljić, sung by Vlastimir "Đuza" Stojiljković in the film Ljubav i moda
- "Mera naam Chin Chin Chu" w. Qamar Jalalabadi m. O.P. Nayyar, sung by Geeta Dutt in the film Howrah Bridge
- "Pod sjajem zvezda" w. Mirjana Savić m. Predrag Ivanović
- "Majulah Singapura" by Zubir Said (national anthem of Singapore)

== Classical music ==
=== Premieres ===
Sortable table
Composer	Composition	Date	Location	Performers
Archer, Violet	Piano Trio No. 2	1958-04-20	(United States) Washington DC (IAFCM)	Balsam, Gottlieb, Klein
Ardévol, José	Music for Little Orchestra	1958-04-19	(United States) Washington FC (IAFCM)	Mexico National Symphony – Herrera de la Fuente
Brian, Havergal	Symphony No. 10	1958-11-03	(United Kingdom) London	London Philharmonia – Pope
Caamaño, Roberto	Piano Concerto	1958-04-18	(United States) Washington DC (IAFCM)	Caamaño / USA National Symphony – Mitchell
Eisler, Hanns	Lenin Requiem	1958-11-22	(East Germany) East Berlin	[Unknown performers]
Ginastera, Alberto	String Quartet No. 2	1958-04-19	(United States) Washington DC (IAFCM)	Juilliard Quartet
Guarnieri, Camargo	Chôro for Clarinet and Orchestra	1958-04-20	(United States) Washington DC (IAFCM)	Wright / USA National Symphony – Mitchell
Imbrie, Andrew	Violin Concerto	1958-04-22	(United States) Berkeley, CA	Robert Gross / San Francisco Symphony – Jordá
Lajtha, Lászlo	Revolution Symphony (Symphony No. 7)	1958-04-26	(France) Paris	Hungarian Radio Orchestra – Lehel
Larsson, Lars-Erik	Concertini: No. 5, for Horn	1958-01-24	(Sweden) Malmö	Lanzky-Otto / Malmö Symphony – Axelsson
Larsson, Lars-Erik	Concertini: No. 8, for Violin	1958-03-13	(Sweden) Gothenburg	Berlin / Gothenburg Symphony – Eckerberg
Ligeti, György	Métamorphoses nocturnes (String Quartet No. 1)	1958-05-08	(Austria) Vienna	Ramor Quartet
Martinu, Bohuslav	The Epic of Gilgamesh, oratorio	1958-01-24	(Switzerland) Basel	Basel Chamber Orchestra and Choir – Sacher
Orrego-Salas, Juan	String Quartet No. 1	1958-04-19	(United States) Washington DC (IAFCM)	Juilliard Quartet
Pettersson, Allan	Concerto for Strings No. 3	1958-03-14	(Sweden) Stockholm	Swedish Radio Symphony – Mann
Porter, Quincy	New England Episodes	1958-04-18	(United States) Washington DC (IAFCM)	USA National Symphony – Mitchell
Shchedrin, Rodion	Symphony No. 1	1958-12-06	(Soviet Union) Moscow	Moscow Philharmonic – Rakhlin
Stockhausen, Karlheinz	Gruppen for three orchestras	1958-03-24	(West Germany) Cologne-Deutz (Koelnmesse, Musik der Zeit)	Cologne Radio Symphony – Stockhausen, Maderna, Boulez
Vaughan Williams, Ralph	Symphony No. 9	1958-04-02	(United Kingdom) London	RPO – Sargent
Vega, Aurelio de la	String Quartet	1958-04-20	(United States) Washington DC (IAFCM)	Claremont Quartet
Villa-Lobos, Heitor	String Quartet No. 15	1958-04-19	(United States) Washington DC (IAFCM)	Juilliard Quartet
Villa-Lobos, Heitor	Symphony No. 12	1958-04-20	(United States) Washington DC (IAFCM)	USA National Symphony – Mitchell

=== Compositions ===
- Jean Absil –

Burlesque, for oboe and piano, Op. 100
Danse rustique, for piano
Fantaisie concertante, for violin and orchestra, Op. 99
"Heure de grâce", for soprano (or tenor) and piano, Op. 98
Silhouettes, for flute and piano, Op. 97

- Yasushi Akutagawa – Ellora Symphony
- William Alwyn –

Fanfare for a Joyful Occasion, for orchestra
Preludes (12), for piano

- Hendrik Andriessen –

Canzoni (3), for chorus
Liturgie Amienj Gospodie, for chorus
Missa "Fiat voluntas tua", for two voices and organ
Uilenspiegel-variatie, for two violins and orchestra

- Jurriaan Andriessen – Duo, for two violins
- Theodore Antoniou – Aquarelles, for piano
- Louis Applebaum –

Cherry Tree Carol, for SATB chorus
King Herod, for SATB chorus

- Hans Erich Apostel –

Höhe des Jahres, for four-part male chorus, Op 28
Piano Concerto, Op. 30
Studie, for flute, viola, and guitar, Op. 29

- Malcolm Arnold – Sinfonietta No. 2, for orchestra, Op. 65
- Tadeusz Baird – Four Essays
- Samuel Barber – Wondrous Love: Variations on a Shape-note Hymn, for organ, Op. 34
- Jürg Baur –

Concertante Music, for piano and orchestra
"Du selber bist das Rad", for mixed chorus
Quintetto sereno, for wind quintet

- Paul Ben-Haim – Lamenatseah mizmor (To the Chief Musician), for orchestra
- Arthur Berger – String Quartet
- William Bergsma –

Concerto, for wind quintet
Praise, for chorus and organ

- Luciano Berio – Sequenza I, for solo flute
- Lennox Berkeley –

Concerto, for piano and double string orchestra, Op. 46
Poems of W.H. Auden (5), for soprano or tenor and piano, Op. 53

- Günter Bialas – Sonata piccola, for violin and piano
- Harrison Birtwistle – Three Sonatas for Nine Instruments (withdrawn)
- Arthur Bliss – The Lady of Shalott (ballet)
- Marc Blitzstein –

Elizabethan Songs (6), for voice and piano
Lear: A Study, for orchestra

- Ernest Bloch –

Suite for Viola Solo (fragmentary)
Suite No. 1 for Violin Solo
Suite No. 2 for Violin Solo

- Rob du Bois – Pieces (3), for clarinet
- André Boucourechliev – Texte I, for tape
- Pierre Boulez –

Doubles, for orchestra
Poésie pour pouvoir, for five-channel tape and three orchestral groups
Le Soleil des eaux, for soprano, tenor, bass, STB chorus, and orchestra (revised version)

- Henry Brant –

The Children's Hour, for six solo voices, chorus, two trumpets, two trombones, organ, and percussion
In Praise of Learning, for 16 sopranos and 16 percussionists
Joquin, for piccolo and six instruments
Mythical Beasts, for soprano and 16 instruments

- Benjamin Britten –

Nocturne, for tenor, 7 obbligato instruments, and strings, Op. 60
Noye's Fludde, one-act opera, Op. 59
Sechs Hölderlin-Fragmente, for voice and piano, Op. 61

- Earle Brown – Pentathis, for flute, bass clarinet, trumpet, trombone, harp, piano, violin, viola, and cello
- Alan Bush –

Ballad of Aldermarston, for speaker, chorus, and orchestra
Ballads of the Sea (2), for piano, Op. 50
Mister Playford's Tunes, for piano, Op. 49
The World Is His Song, for baritone, chorus, and orchestra, Op. 51

- John Cage –

Aria, for solo voice
Concert, for piano and orchestra
Fontana Mix, for tape
Haiku, for any instruments
Music Walk, for piano (one or more players, also using radio and/or recordings)
Solo for Voice 1
TV Köln, for piano
Variations I, for any number of players, and any means

- Cornelius Cardew –

Books of Study for Pianists (2), for two pianos
Piano Sonata No. 3

- Julián Carrillo –

Balbuceos, for micro-tonal piano and chamber orchestra
Concerto, for 1/3-tone piano and orchestra

- Mario Castelnuovo-Tedesco –

Endymion, for chorus, Op. 184
The Fiery Furnace (chamber cantata), for baritone, children's voices, piano or organ and percussion, Op. 183
Little Songs (3), for voice and piano
Pastorale and Rondo, for clarinet, violin, cello, and piano, Op. 185

- Niccolò Castiglioni –

Inizio di movimento, for piano
Sequenze, for orchestra

- Carlos Chávez – Invención, for piano
- Chou Wen-chung –

Soliloquy of a Bhiksuni, for trumpet, brass, and percussion
To a Wayfarer, for clarinet, harp, percussion, and strings

- Aldo Clementi – Episode, for orchestra
- Ramiro Cortés –

America, cycle of four songs for soprano and strings
Chamber Concerto, for cello and 12 wind instruments

- Henry Cowell –

Andrée's Birthday, for treble instrument
Birthday Piece, for 2 treble instruments
Concerto for Percussion and Orchestra
Duet, for 2 soprano instruments
[Duet], for 2 treble instruments
Henry's Hornpipe, for treble instrument
Introduction and Allegro, for viola and harpsichord or piano
Jim's B'day, for piano
Love to Sidney, for soprano instrument and piano:Rondo for Brass, for 3 trumpets, 2 horns, and 2 trombones
Lullaby for Philio, for treble instrument:Hymn and Fuguing Tune No. 12, for 3 horns
Wedding Rondo, for unaccompanied clarinet

- Ingolf Dahl – Fanfares, for piano
- Luigi Dallapiccola –

Concerto per la notte di Natale dell'anno 1956, for soprano and chamber orchestra (revised version)
Requiescant, for chorus and orchestra

- Mario Davidovsky – String Quartet No. 2
- Peter Maxwell Davies –

Prolation, for orchestra
Sextet, for flute, clarinet, bass clarinet, piano, violin, and cello

- Norman Dello Joio –

O Sing unto the Lord (Psalm 48), men's voices and organ
To St Cecilia, for SATB chorus and piano or brass

- David Diamond – Wind Quintet
- Franco Donatoni – String Quartet No. 2
- Antal Doráti – The Two Enchantments of Li-Tai-Po, for baritone and chamber orchestra
- Jacob Druckman – Madrigals (4), for SATB chorus
- Vernon Duke – Variations on an Old Russian Chant, for oboe and strings
- Marcel Dupré –

Motets (2), for chorus, Op. 53
Quartet in D Minor, for organ, violin, viola, and cello, Op. 52

- John Eaton –

String Quartet
Tertullian Overture, for orchestra

- Petr Eben – Láska a smrt (Love and Death), for mixed chorus
- Helmut Eder –

Pezzo sereno, for orchestra

- Cecil Effinger –

Little Symphony No. 2
Symphony No. 5
Wind Quintet

- Gottfried von Einem –

Lieder (5), for soprano or tenor and piano, Op. 25
Das Stundenlied, for SATB chorus and orchestra, Op. 26

- Hanns Eisler –

Am 1. Mai, for voice with small orchestra
Steht auf!, for voice and piano

- Halim El-Dabh – Clytemnestra, ballet
- Edison Denisov - Sonata for Two Violins
- Hans Ulrich Engelmann –

Noche da luna, dance pantomime
Nocturnos, for soprano and chamber orchestra

- Donald Erb –

Chamber Concerto, for piano and strings
Correlations, for piano
Dialogue, for violin and piano

- Heimo Erbse – Ruth, ballet in two acts, Op. 16
- Rudolf George Escher – Symphony No. 2
- Alvin Etler –

Concerto for violin and wind quintet
"Peace Be unto You", for SATB chorus

- Franco Evangelisti – Proporzioni, for flute solo
- Ferenc Farkas – Lieder (3)
- Robert Farnon –

City Streets, for orchestra
Dominion Day, for orchestra
Mr Punch, for orchestra
Rhapsody for violin and orchestra

- David Farquhar – In Despite of Death, song cycle for baritone and piano
- Samuil Feinberg – Maritza, cycle of eight songs for voice and piano, Op. 47
- Jindřich Feld – Violin Concerto
- Morton Feldman –

Ixion (Summerspace) (ballet), for ten instruments
Piano, for piano four-hands
Two Instruments, for horn and cello

- Luc Ferrari –

Étude aux accidents, for tape
Étude aux sons tendus, for tape

- Jacobo Ficher – Mi Aldea, cantata for soprano, alto, tenor, and chamber orchestra, Op. 91
- Irving Fine – Romanza, for wind quintet
- Nicolas Flagello – Serenata for orchestra, Op. 58
- Wolfgang Fortner _

Ballet blanc, for two violins and string orchestra
Berceuse royale, for soprano, violin, and string orchestra

- Lukas Foss –

Ode, for orchestra (revised version)
Symphony of Chorales, for orchestra

- Jean Françaix –

La dame dans la lune, ballet
Divertimento, for horn and orchestra
L'homme entre deux âges, for voice, flute, and string quintet

- Benjamin Frankel – Symphony No. 1
- Alberto Ginastera –

Hay que bañar al nene (film score)
El límite (incidental music)
Primavera de la vida (film score)
String Quartet No. 2, Op. 26

- Marcel Grandjany – Fantaisie sur un thème de J. Haydn, Op. 31, for harp
- Ferde Grofé – Concerto in D, for piano and orchestra
- Alois Hába – String Quartet No. 11, Op. 87
- Paul Hindemith –

Pittsburgh Symphony
12 Fünfstimmige Madrigale for mixed chorus
Octet for clarinet, bassoon, horn, violin, two violas, cello, and double bass

- Dmitri Kabalevsky – In the Magic Forest
- Mauricio Kagel – Anagrama, for soprano, alto, baritone, bass, speaking chorus, flute, clarinet, bass clarinet, 3 percussionists, celesta, 2 pianos, and 2 harps
- Leon Kirchner – String Quartet No. 2
- György Ligeti – Artikulation
- Witold Lutosławski – Funeral music
- Bohuslav Martinů –

Piano Concerto No. 5, H. 366
The Parables H. 367
Estampes
Duo No. 2 for Violin and Cello

- Peter Mennin – Piano Concerto
- Darius Milhaud – String Sextet, Op. 368
- José Pablo Moncayo –

Pequeño nocturno, for piano
Symphony No. 2 (unfinished)
Tierra (ballet), for orchestra

- Thea Musgrave – String Quartet
- Luigi Nono

Cori di Didone, for chorus and percussion
Piccola gala notturna veneziana in onore dei 60 anni di Heinrich Strobel, for 14 instruments
La terra e la compagna, for soprano, tenor, chorus, and instruments

- Per Nørgård – Constellations, for strings
- Harry Partch – Windsong, film score for ensemble of original instruments
- Arvo Pärt - Partita, Op. 2 for piano
- Goffredo Petrassi –

Saluto augurale, for orchestra
Serenata, for flute, harpsichord, percussion, viola, and contrabass
String Quartet

- George Rochberg – Cheltenham Concerto, for flute, oboe, clarinet, bassoon, horn, trumpet, trombone, and strings
- Ned Rorem – Symphony No. 3
- Edmund Rubbra – Pezzo Ostinato (Rubbra collections page with description) and Violin Concerto, Opp. 102 and 103.
- Carl Ruggles – Exaltation
- Giacinto Scelsi –

String Trio
I presagi for 11 players: 9 brass and 2 percussion
Tre canti popolari for four-voice mixed choir
Tre canti sacri for eight-voice mixed choir

- Dieter Schnebel –

für stimmen ( ... missa est): dt 31,6, for 12 vocal ensembles
Raum-Zeit Y, for instruments

- Alfred Schnittke – Oratorio Nagasaki
- Humphrey Searle – Symphony No. 2, Op. 33 (1956–8); Variations and Finale, Op. 34
- Roger Sessions –

String Quintet
Symphony No. 4

- Dmitri Shostakovich – Moskva, Cheryomushki, operetta, Op. 105
- Toru Takemitsu –

Kamitsukareta kaoyaku [A Boss Who was Bitten] (film score)
Kokusen'ya, incidental music
Pananpe no omoigakenai shōri no hanashi [The Story of Panape's Unexpected Victory], for tenor, baritone, clarinet, vibraphone, piano, guitar, and percussion
Solitude sonore, for orchestra
Sora, uma, soshite shi [Sky, Horse and Death], for tape
Tableau noir, for speaker and chamber orchestra
Yume no hoshi [A Star in a Dream] (television music)
Utau dake, for chorus

- Eduard Tubin – Symphony No. 7
- Edgard Varèse – Poème électronique (1957–58)
- Anatol Vieru –

Concerto for Flute and Orchestra
Eight Miniatures, for piano

- Heitor Villa-Lobos –

Bendita sabedoria, for six-part choir
Fantasia, for wind orchestra
Fantasia concertante, for orchestra of cellos (at least 32 instruments)
Green Mansions (film score, concert arrangement as Forest of the Amazon)
Magnificat alleluia, solo voice, chorus, and orchestra
A menina das nuvens, musical adventure in three acts

- Leó Weiner – Concerto for Violin No. 1 in D major
- Stefan Wolpe –

Dust of Sorrow, for SATB choir
The Hour Glass (dramatic scene)
The Way a Crow, for SATB choir

- Iannis Xenakis –

Analogique A, for string ensemble
Concret PH, for 2-track tape

- Bernd Alois Zimmermann –

Impromptu, for orchestra
Omnia tempus habent, canatata for soprano and 17 instruments

== Opera ==
- Samuel Barber – Vanessa
- Carlisle Floyd – Wuthering Heights
- Jakov Gotovac – Dalmaro
- Gian Carlo Menotti – Maria Golovin
- Ildebrando Pizzetti – Assassinio nella cattedrale
- Humphrey Searle – The Diary of a Madman

== Film ==
- William Alwyn - A Night to Remember
- Georges Auric - Bonjour Tristesse
- James Bernard - Dracula
- Miles Davis - Elevator to the Gallows
- Bernard Herrmann - The 7th Voyage of Sinbad
- Bernard Herrmann - Vertigo
- Henry Mancini - Touch of Evil
- Jerome Moross - The Big Country

== Musical theatre ==
- The Body Beautiful Broadway production, opened at The Broadway Theatre and ran for 60 performances
- The Boy Friend (Sandy Wilson) – off-Broadway revival
- Expresso Bongo London production
- Flower Drum Song (Richard Rodgers and Oscar Hammerstein II) Broadway production, opened at the St. James Theatre and ran for 600 performances
- Irma La Douce London production
- Lola Montez, Brisbane production opened at Her Majesty's Theatre, Brisbane on October 1
- Oh, Captain! Broadway production opened at the Alvin Theatre on February 4 and ran for 192 performances.
- Salad Days (Julian Slade) New York production ran for 80 performances
- Valmouth London production
- West Side Story (Leonard Bernstein) – London production
- Where's Charley? London production

== Musical films ==
- April Love starring Pat Boone and Shirley Jones
- Damn Yankees starring Tab Hunter, Gwen Verdon and Ray Walston
- The Duke Wore Jeans British film starring Tommy Steele
- Gigi starring Leslie Caron, Louis Jourdan, Maurice Chevalier and Hermione Gingold
- King Creole starring Elvis Presley
- Mardi Gras starring Pat Boone
- Música de Siempre, featuring Édith Piaf
- Senior Prom starring Jill Corey
- South Pacific starring Mitzi Gaynor
- The Tunnel of Love

== Musical television ==
- Aladdin (Cole Porter) televised on February 21 starring Cyril Ritchard, Basil Rathbone, Dennis King, Sal Mineo, Anna Maria Alberghetti and Una Merkel.
- Hansel and Gretel (William Engvick and Alec Wilder) televised on April 27 starring Barbara Cook and Red Buttons
- Kiss Me, Kate starring Alfred Drake, Patricia Morison, Julie Wilson, Bill Hayes and Jack Klugman

== Births ==
- January 1
  - Grandmaster Flash, rapper
  - Renn Woods, singer (Hair)
- January 2 – Vladimir Ovchinnikov, Russian pianist
- January 8 – Steve Garvey, bass guitarist (Buzzcocks, The Teardrops and Bok Bok)
- January 9 – Hillevi Martinpelto, Swedish operatic soprano
- January 10 – Samira Said, Moroccan singer
- January 11
  - Vicki Peterson, rock guitarist and songwriter (The Bangles and Psycho Sisters)
  - Trevor Taylor, Jamaican-German singer and musician
- January 21 – Frank Ticheli, American composer and academic
- January 24 – Jools Holland, R&B pianist and singer, TV music presenter
- January 29 – Vlatka Oršanić, opera singer
- February 10 – Michael Weiss, jazz pianist and composer
- February 12 – Grant McLennan, Australian singer-songwriter and guitarist (The Go-Betweens and Jack Frost) (died 2006)
- February 16 – Ice-T, American musician, rapper, songwriter, actor, record executive, record producer and author
- February 21
  - Jake Burns, punk rock frontman (Stiff Little Fingers)
  - Mary Chapin Carpenter, American country/folk singer-songwriter
- February 23 – David Sylvian, new wave singer-songwriter (Japan)
- February 25 – Eva Johansson, Danish operatic soprano
- March 1 – Nik Kershaw, English pop singer-songwriter
- March 5 – Andy Gibb, English pop singer-songwriter, performer and teen idol (Bee Gees) (died 1988)
- March 8 – Gary Numan, English new wave synth-pop singer
- March 9 – Martin Fry, English pop singer-songwriter (ABC)
- March 10 – Frankie Ruiz, Puerto Rican salsa singer (died 1998)
- March 28 – Edesio Alejandro, Cuban composer (died 2025)
- April 10
  - Yefim Bronfman, Russian-born pianist
  - Errollyn Wallen, Belize-born composer
- April 11 – Stuart Adamson, rock singer and guitarist (Big Country) (died 2001)
- April 12 – Will Sergeant, rock guitarist (Echo & the Bunnymen)
- April 14 – Aprile Millo, American operatic soprano of Italian and Irish ancestry
- April 18 – Les Pattinson, rock bassist and songwriter (Echo & the Bunnymen)
- April 21 – Andranik Madadian, Armenian/Iranian singer-songwriter
- April 25 – Fish, Scottish singer (Marillion)
- April 29 – Eve Plumb, American actress, singer, and painter
- May 2 – Mayumi Horikawa, Japanese singer-songwriter and model
- May 6 – Lolita Flores, Spanish actress and singer
- May 9 - Kim Hye-ok, South Korean actress
- May 10 – Vlada Divljan, Serbian singer-songwriter and guitarist (Idoli and Apartchiks) (died 2015)
- May 11 – Sayuri Kume, Japanese singer-songwriter
- May 12 – Eric Singer, American drummer and songwriter
- May 16 – Glenn Gregory, English singer, songwriter and multi-instrumentalist (Heaven 17)
- May 18 – Toyah Willcox, English singer and actress
- May 21 – Mike Barson (Madness)
- May 23 – Shelly West, American country singer
- May 25 – Paul Weller, singer-songwriter The Jam, Style Council
- May 26 – Wayne Hussey, English rock guitarist (The Sisters of Mercy) and singer (The Mission)
- May 27 – Neil Finn, singer-songwriter, Split Enz, Crowded House
- May 30 – Marie Fredriksson, pop singer-songwriter (Roxette) (died 2019)
- June 2 – Karl Gottfried Brunotte, German composer and music philosopher
- June 3 – Roger Redgate, British composer-conductor
- June 7 – Prince, American singer-songwriter, multi instrumentalist, record executive, record producer, musician and film maker (died 2016)
- June 12 – Meredith Brooks, American singer-songwriter and guitarist
- June 17 – Jello Biafra, American singer (Dead Kennedys)
- June 21
  - Jennifer Larmore, American operatic mezzo-soprano
  - Steve Lieberman, American punk musician (Gangsta Rabbi)
- June 22 – Rocío Banquells, Mexican pop singer and actress
- June 24
  - Levi Roots, Jamaican reggae musician
  - Kathy Troccoli, American singer and author
- June 27
  - Lisa Germano, American singer-songwriter and guitarist (OP8 and Eels)
  - Brian Helicopter, English bass player (The Shapes, HellsBelles and Rogue Male)
  - Magnus Lindberg, Finnish pianist and composer
  - Jeffrey Lee Pierce, American singer-songwriter and guitarist (The Gun Club) (died 1996)
- June 28 – Félix Gray, French singer-songwriter
- June 29
  - Jeff Coopwood, American actor and singer
  - Mark Radcliffe, English radio host and folk rock singer (Shirehorses and The Family Mahone)
- June 30
  - Kalevi Kiviniemi, Finnish concert organist (died 2024)
  - Esa-Pekka Salonen, Finnish composer-conductor
- July 3 – Aaron Tippin, country singer
- July 5 – Paul Daniel, operatic and orchestral conductor
- July 7 – Michala Petri, recorder virtuoso
- July 18 – Bent Sørensen, composer
- July 25 – Thurston Moore, rock guitarist and singer-songwriter (Sonic Youth)
- July 26 – Angela Hewitt, classical pianist
- July 27 – Kimmo Hakola, Finnish composer
- July 30 – Kate Bush, English singer-songwriter, musician, dancer and record producer
- July 31
  - Bill Berry, alternative rock drummer (R.E.M.)
  - Deborah Riedel, operatic soprano (died 2009)
- August 3 – Rob Buck, alternative rock guitarist and songwriter (10,000 Maniacs)
- August 4 – Ian Broudie, English musician and singer-songwriter (The Lightning Seeds)
- August 6 – Randy DeBarge, soul singer and guitarist
- August 7 – Bruce Dickinson, singer (Iron Maiden)
- August 16 – Madonna, American singer-songwriter, actress, activist and businesswoman
- August 17 – Belinda Carlisle, American singer-songwriter.
- August 22
  - Ian Mitchell, British pop bassist (Bay City Rollers)
  - Vernon Reid, British-born rock guitarist and songwriter (Living Colour)
- August 29 – Michael Jackson, American performer, pop singer-songwriter (died 2009)
- September 3 – Radoslav Lorković, Croatian pianist and accordionist
- September 6 – Buster Bloodvessel, vocalist (Bad Manners)
- September 7 – Danny Chan, Hong Kong singer and actor
- September 10 – Siobhan Fahey, Irish pop singer-songwriter (Bananarama, Shakespears Sister)
- September 13 – Paweł Przytocki, Polish conductor
- September 14 – Rachid Taha, Algerian-born singer and activist (died 2018)
- September 19
  - Lita Ford, English-born American rock guitarist, actress, vocalist and songwriter (The Runaways)
  - Lucky Ali, singer, composer and actor
- September 22
  - Andrea Bocelli, operatic tenor
  - Joan Jett, American alternative rock singer-songwriter, composer, musician, record producer and occasional actress (Joan Jett & the Blackhearts)
- October 2 – Robbie Nevil, singer/songwriter
- October 9 – Al Jourgensen, Cuban-American industrial rock singer-songwriter and producer (Ministry)
- October 10 – Tanya Tucker, country singer
- October 13 – Derri Daugherty, American alternative rock singer-songwriter, guitarist and producer (The Choir, The Lost Dogs)
- October 14 – Thomas Dolby, English rock musician
- October 20 - Mark King, bassist and singer (Level 42)
- October 24 - Mathilde Santing, Dutch singer
- October 27 – Simon Le Bon, vocalist (Duran Duran)
- November 1 – Joe DeRenzo, American drummer, composer and producer
- November 10 – Frank Maudsley (A Flock of Seagulls)
- November 22
  - Jason Ringenberg (Jason & the Scorchers)
  - Jamie Lee Curtis, American actress and children's author
- November 27 – Tetsuya Komuro, Japanese songwriter and music producer
- December 7 – Timothy Butler (The Psychedelic Furs)
- December 8 – Sylvia Mason-James, British singer
- December 9 – Nick Seymour, bassist (Crowded House)
- December 11 – Nikki Sixx (Mötley Crüe)
- December 12 – Dag Ingebrigtsen, Norwegian singer-songwriter and guitarist (The Kids and TNT)
- December 14
  - Mike Scott (The Waterboys)
  - Spider Stacy, folk musician (The Pogues)
- December 17 – Mike Mills (R.E.M.)
- December 23 – Victoria Williams, American folk singer-songwriter and guitarist
- December 25
  - Alannah Myles, Canadian singer-songwriter
  - Juancho Rois, Colombian vallenato accordionist and composer (died 1994)
- probable – Fortuna, Brazilian singer

== Deaths ==
- January 20 – Ataúlfo Argenta, conductor, 44 (carbon monoxide poisoning)
- February 5 – Lew Brown, lyricist, 64
- March 24 – John Harvey Gahan, violinist, songwriter and actor, 69
- March 25
  - Tom Brown, jazz trombonist, 69
  - Emerson Whithorne, composer and historian, 73
- March 28 – W. C. Handy, blues composer, 84
- April 1
  - Břetislav Bakala, pianist, conductor and composer, 61
  - Alfred Bryan, songwriter, 86
- April 2 – Tudor Davies, operatic tenor, 65
- April 10 – Chuck Willis, singer, 30 (during surgery for stomach ulcer)
- April 16 – Margaret Burke Sheridan, operatic soprano, 68
- May 20 – Irma Baltuttis, singer, 37 (suspected murder)
- June 1 – Henri Pensis, violinist, conductor and composer, 57
- June 3
  - Georges Boulanger, violinist, 65
  - Maude Nugent, songwriter, 81
- June 15 – José Pablo Moncayo, Mexican percussionist and composer, 45
- June 20 – Elfriede Trötschel, operatic soprano, 44
- June 21 – Eduard Erdmann, pianist and composer, 62
- June 23 – Armas Järnefelt, composer, 88
- June 27 – Marie Sundelius, operatic soprano, 74
- July 10 – Karl Erb, operatic tenor and lieder singer, 81
- July 31
  - Eugène Goossens, fils, violinist and conductor, 91
  - Percy Scholes, musicologist, 81
- August 5 – Joseph Holbrooke, composer, 80
- August 15 – Big Bill Broonzy, blues musician and composer, 60
- August 17 – Florent Schmitt, composer, 87
- August 21 – Stevan Hristić, composer, 73
- August 26 – Ralph Vaughan Williams, composer, 85
- September 20 – Yvonne Arnaud, pianist, singer and actress, 65
- September 23 – Alfred Piccaver, British-born American operatic tenor, 74
- October 13 – Alexander Veprik, composer, 59
- October 24 – Martin Shaw, composer, 83
- October 25 – Artie Matthews, ragtime composer and songwriter, 69
- October 27 – John Wooldridge, film composer, 39 (car accident)
- October 29 – Vassili Nebolsin, conductor, 60
- November 3 – Harry Revel, composer of musicals, 52
- November 26 – Tiny Bradshaw, jazz and blues musician, 53 (stroke)
- November 27 – Artur Rodziński, conductor, 66
- December 1 – Boots Mallory, dancer, 45 (chronic throat disease)
- December 8 – Julia Lee, blues singer, 56 (heart attack)
- December 11 – Paul Bazelaire, cellist, 72
- December 20 – Éva Gauthier, operatic soprano, 73
- December 29 – Doris Humphrey, dancer and choreographer, 63
- date unknown
  - Samuel Antek, violinist and conductor
  - John Strachan, ballad singer

== Awards ==
=== Eurovision Song Contest ===
- Eurovision Song Contest 1958

=== Tchaikovsky International Piano Competition ===
- Van Cliburn
