= Trace Elliot =

British audio equipment manufacturer

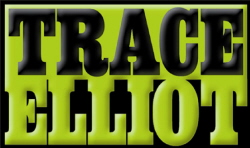
- Industry: Audio equipment
- Founded: 1979
- Parent: Peavey Electronics Europe, Ltd
- Website: http://www.traceelliot.com

Trace Elliot is a United Kingdom-based bass amplification manufacturer, and has a sub-brand, Trace Acoustic, for acoustic instruments.

== History ==
A music shop in Romford, Essex, UK, called The Soundwave Bassplace opened in 1978. The shop began building and renting PA systems to local musicians and soon noticed that some of this equipment was instead being employed by bass players, who historically worked using slightly modified guitar amplification, which was underpowered and unsuitable for their needs. In 1979, the shop's owner, Fred Friedlein, and his staff including Alan Morgan (sales) and Stuart Watson (design engineer) recognized the potential market for bass amplification and developed a new range of products incorporating MOSFET output stages driving large cabinets. Soundwave was then rebranded as Trace-Elliot.

Several features made Trace-Elliot's new product unique: the GP11 pre-amp featured 11 graphic EQ bands which were very broad bands, overlapping each other, thereby enabling large amounts of frequency cut or boost when adjacent bands were boosted or cut. Secondly, the frequency bands were spaced closer together towards the bass end allowing greater variation in a bassist's sound. MOSFET power amps of 250 or 500 watts and the option of bi-amplified systems where bass and upper frequencies are filtered before being separately amplified and fed to dedicated high frequency and low frequency speaker cabinets added to the distinctive qualities. Trace Elliot gained a reputation and early users included John Paul Jones of Led Zeppelin, Andy Rourke of The Smiths and Brian Helicopter of punk band The Shapes. Mark King of Level 42 was also an early adopter of the brand. The company moved to new premises in Witham, Essex, in 1985 to satisfy the growing demand.

In late 1986, Watson, technical director and designer of the Trace Elliot range up to the Mark 5 series, left the company. That same year Friedlein (then sole owner of Trace Elliot) employed the services of freelance electronics designer Clive Button. In 1986, Mark Gooday was appointed managing director and given 24% of the company by Friedlein in thanks for the growth and production changes made by Gooday.

In 1989, Trace Elliot introduced the Trace Acoustic range of acoustic amplifiers, whose features were developed by Friedlein, Gooday, Clive Roberts and Clive Button. The company moved again from its base on Witham, this time to Maldon, Essex.

In 1992, the company was bought by Kaman, which had previously handled the brand's US distribution. The reason for the sale was the need for growth and the importance of the US market. Kaman staff would service a brand but would not grow brands unless they owned them. This arrangement was suggested to Friedlein by Gooday (to whom Friedlein had offered the full company at a very low price). The sale to Kaman meant Friedlein could retire and Gooday could see the brand grow with Kaman.

Kaman downsized their music division in 1997 and sold the company to a trio of Trace Elliot directors, who took ownership of a brand with nearly 200 staff on a 110,000-square-foot (10,000 m^{2}) site; they focused on exploiting the North American market, and in 1998 sold the company as Trace Elliot USA to Gibson.

In January 2002, the factory was closed and all the staff were laid off. Gibson moved the production of a few particular products they wanted to continue with to various locations in the United States.

In April 2005 it was announced that Peavey Electronics had acquired the North American distribution rights to the Trace Elliot brand.

== False claims regarding world's first bass-dedicated 4 × 10″ speaker cabinet ==
Contrary to what Trace Elliot claimed in its product catalogs in the 1980s and 1990s, the company didn't build the world's first bass-dedicated 4 × 10″ speaker cabinet. The Ampeg price list AV9002 (Rev. 6-75), effective July 1, 1975, lists the EXB40 (officially named B-40) in the Bass Outfits section as a self-contained 4 × 10″ speaker cabinet, preceding the Trace Elliot 1048 speaker cabinet by five years.

== Notable products, past and present ==
- GP11 pre-amplifier, very collectable unit combined with various power amp models produced in the 1980s.
- 1110 Combo, a combination amplifier/speaker unit comprising a GP11 pre-amplifier, V5 mosfet amplifier and 4 × 10″ bass cabinet.
- 1048H Successor to the world's first dedicated 4 × 10″ bass cabinet.
- BLX-80, a compact 80 watt bass combo with an innovative back-of-cabinet mounted 10″ speaker and a full-featured GP7 pre-amp section. The name was derived from the phrase "the dog's bollocks" which was used to describe the combo during development.
- AH1000-12 Fully featured bass head with 12 Band EQ, Valve Drive, dual band compression and many other features.
- Trace Acoustic range. Numerous models for amplifying acoustic instruments.
- GP12SMX Bass Preamp: 12 Band EQ Bass Pre-amp. The basis for the preamp in all the SMX series.
- V-Type V6 300 W all valve head. Used by many Britpop bands in the '90s.
- V-Type V8 400 W all valve head, with overdrive and compression on board.
- Velocette: 1990s-era 15 W valve-powered guitar combos; several variants, basis for the Gibson Goldtone range.
