= Castle Communications =

Former British music label

Castle Communications PLC
- Type: Private
- Industry: Publishing, distribution
- Genre: Musical reissues and repertoire
- Founded: 1983; 43 years ago
- Founder: Terry Shand, Cliff Dane, Jon Beecher
- Defunct: 2007; 19 years ago
- Fate: renamed Sanctuary Records Group Ltd
- Headquarters: Chessington, Greater London, United Kingdom
- Area served: Worldwide
- Parent: BMG Rights Management since 2013; Universal Music Group 2007 - 2013; The Sanctuary Group 2000 - 2007; Rutland Trust 1998 - 2000; Alliance Entertainment Corp (US) 1994 - 1998
- Subsidiaries: Dojo Ltd; Knight Records; Sequel Records

Castle Communications, also known as Castle Music, was a British independent record label and home video distributor founded in 1983 by Terry Shand, Cliff Dane, and Jon Beecher. Its video imprint was called Castle Vision. The label's production ceased in 2007, and its remaining rights are now chiefly vested in BMG Rights Management. Castle also operated subsidiary labels including Essential Records, Raw Power & When!.

== History ==
Starting out as a mid-price catalogue reissue specialist, with labels including The Collector Series and Dojo, it grew into the largest European owner of repertoire outside the major record companies. It purchased catalogues including Pye, Piccadilly, Bradley's, Bronze, Black Sabbath, Sugar Hill, Transatlantic, Beserkley, All Platinum and Solar. They possessed most of the Transatlantic and Trailer catalogue.

Starting in the early 1980s, they released compilations and reissued work by Fairport Convention, John Renbourn, Barbara Dickson, Steeleye Span, the Watersons, Richard Thompson, Geoff Turton and many others. They also diversified to reissue several early albums by the Fall as well as "Pink Years" and "Blue Years" albums by Tangerine Dream, and compilations by Nurse with Wound and Current 93. They have also released a comprehensive compilation featuring songs by Canadian rock band, Triumph.

In the 1980s, they were notable for releasing many heavy metal compilations albums under the series name Metal Killers. Interest in these licensed releases led them to form their own heavy metal imprint Raw Power, to sign and promote new rock acts, rather than to just license older product from other more established labels. The first signing to the Raw Power label was the NWOBHM act Hell's Belles, releasing their debut album and single in 1985. After several years, the Raw Power imprint was retired with the decline of heavy metal in the UK.

Castle Communications was sold to Alliance Entertainment Corp, at the time the largest independent music distributor in the United States, for $38.5 million / £24.5 million in 1994. In 2000, they were acquired by Sanctuary Records Group. The label was dissolved when Sanctuary became a Universal Music Group subsidiary in 2007. Since 2013 Sanctuary has been owned by BMG Rights Management, with global distribution handled by Universal Music Group.

== Castle Vision/Home Video ==
Castle Vision was Castle Communications' home video distributor arm. It released many videotapes, including TUGS, The Raggy Dolls, Tumbledown Farm, Heathcliff, Alvin and the Chipmunks, You've Been Framed!, the Men of our Time series (documentaries about Hitler, Lenin, Gandhi and Kennedy), a documentary called Falklands War: The Untold Story, The Fugitive, Harry's Game as well as movies Bill & Ted's Excellent Adventure and Phantom of the Opera which, when released to the rental video market, were duplicated/distributed via CBS/Fox Video, acting as Castle's rental sales agent.

== See also ==
- List of record labels
