= Brian Helicopter =

- An airborne Brian Helicopter circa 1980

Background information
- Born: Gareth Holder; 27 June 1958 (age 67); Leamington Spa
- Genres: Punk rock
- Occupation: Musician
- Instrument: Bass guitar

Brian Helicopter is the stage name of Gareth Holder (born 27 June 1958, Leamington Spa), an English musician, based in the United States. He is best known for playing bass guitar for the UK punk rock band The Shapes. He also played for many other bands, the most notable being the NWOBHM bands Rogue Male and HellsBelles. For a short time in the early 1980s, he was also a member of British R&B band The Mosquitos, with guitarist Steve Walwyn of Dr. Feelgood and Eddie and the Hot Rods, and can be seen on the cover of The Mosquitos only single "Somethin' Outta Nothin'". A prolific session player, he appears both credited and uncredited on many releases throughout the 1980s and early 1990s under both his real and stage name. He was one of the first bassists in the nascent UK punk scene to adopt the Rickenbacker bass guitar which he still uses to this day. He was also one of the first bass guitarists in the world to use Trace Elliot amplification. His bass playing style is characterized by a very fast precise pick attack, and fast runs. Unusually for a bass guitarist, he sometimes utilizes an overhand tapping technique more common to six string players. He continues to play professionally, reverting between his real name and his stage name as the fancy takes him. He is also a professional skydiving coach and instructor, currently holding seven world records in the sport. He can be seen in an episode of MythBusters aired on the Discovery Channel taking presenter Kari Byron skydiving whilst testing the falling airplane blue ice myth. He is also a vegetarian. He can be seen in the independent film Six Sex Scenes and a Murder, in the role of the bounty hunter. He currently resides in California, where he plays bass for the San Francisco Bay Area band Ghosthookers. Ghosthookers released a record in 2008 which features Brian Helicopter on bass under his real name.

In late 2008, he rejoined the original line-up of The Shapes for short tour of the UK to commemorate the 30th anniversary of the band, culminating in dates with The Damned in London, and once again in 2014 for the "You'll Do Yourself a Mischief" tour of the UK, to support the re-release of the Shapes's first two singles, and the re-release of the album on 12 inch vinyl, called "More Songs for Sensible People"

In 2016, he once more joined The Shapes for the "We're Not Very Famous" tour of the UK, and to record new material, and in 2017 undertook tours of Japan and the UK with them to promote the release of The Shapes's third single "Don't Play Tennis" b/w "We're Not very Famous".

In March of 2026, he filled in on bass for some dates for Oakland based punk band Nixed.

== Gear ==
Brian Helicopter uses Rickenbacker 4000 series basses exclusively. All of his basses are set up slightly differently so as to achieve different sounds live or in the studio. His main stage bass is a 1975 4001 model finished in jetglo. This model has been customized with checkerboard binding and a half inched spaced classic reissue toaster pickup in the neck position. His other basses are a 1979 fireglo 4001 which is customized with a one-inch spaced custom Sergio Silva hand wound toaster in the neck position and a Rickenbacker reissue horseshoe pickup in the bridge position. With the Ghosthookers, his main stage bass is a rare hand carved 4004LK bass, the Lemmy of Motörhead limited-edition model. Less than 60 of these were produced, his personal bass is number 26 in that series. He also uses two mono basses, a highly customized azureglo 4001S with Rickenbacker reissue toaster and horseshoe pickups, and a 4001CS Chris Squire of Yes limited edition bass. He has number 270 in that series of 1000 produced. He also occasionally uses a lightly modified custom 4008 eight string bass. He also uses a 1995 mapleglo 4003 fretless bass, a 1973 jetglo 4001, and a single pickup 1972 4000 series bass.

His amplification is by Trace Elliot. Currently he uses a GP12SMX dual compressor preamp with AH250 power stage, and a GP7 preamp with AH350 power stage. This gives him the option to run his 4001 series basses in stereo live and to EQ each pickup separately. He runs the amps through two 1048 dual ported 4x10 cabinets with high frequency horns, and two dual ported 1015 1x15 cabinets.
