= Metal Forces =

British music magazine

- Metal Forces cover from August 1988
- Editor: Bernard Doe
- Categories: Rock music
- Frequency: Weekly
- Founder: Bernard Doe
- Founded: 1983
- Final issue: 1992
- Company: Rockzone Publications Ltd.
- Country: United Kingdom
- Based in: Stevenage, Hertfordshire, England
- Language: English
- Website: metalforcesmagazine.com
- ISSN: 0959-6461
- OCLC: 859210254

Metal Forces is a British heavy metal and hard rock music publication founded in 1983. It was well known for its coverage of unsigned bands through its Demolition feature and championed the likes of Metallica, Slayer, Megadeth, HellsBelles, Overkill, Death, and Poison long before they had secured record deals. They are credited as contributing in this fashion to the success of the band Anacrusis. Dave Reynolds, a former writer for Metal Forces, has claimed that the magazine was the first to coin the terms thrash metal and death metal. A Metal Forces compiled vinyl album, Demolition – Scream Your Brains Out!, based on the magazine's popular Demolition column, was released in 1988 through Chain Reaction Records featuring Anacrusis, Atrophy, Hobbs' Angel of Death, Aftermath and the Chris Barnes fronted Leviathan. In addition to metal acts, the magazine also featured interviews with alternative rock acts such as Nirvana.

In August 1991, Metal Forces created the offshoot publication Thrash 'n Burn, a monthly title dedicated to extreme metal.

== History ==
Metal Forces was created in 1983 by Bernard Doe, with the first issue released in August 1983. Articles covered and promoted mainly bands that were relatively unknown at the time. Metal Forces aided greatly in promoting unknown bands and heavy metal and hard rock during the 1980s and early 1990s, becoming one of UK's top music magazines during that period.

During the early 1990s, Metal Forces changed from their policy of balancing their articles between established and unknown bands, to a style which covered more mainstream and famed rock and heavy metal bands. The changes implemented were not profitable and the magazine lost readers and advertisers. In this period and for a brief time, Metal Forces launched the appreciated spin-off Thrash 'n Burn (later renamed Xtreme Noize). Metal Forces released seventy-two issues before rebranding under the abbreviated title of MF. The latter ceased publication in February 1993. As of 2012, Metal Forces launched its official website online, which has information from its magazine issues and new information and coverage of bands.

In an interview, rock columnist Dave Reynolds indicated that the magazine was created in response to difficulties working with rival publication Kerrang! According to Reynolds, the magazine gained national distribution in the late 1980s and, with its success, inspired Kerrang! to produce a spin-off publication of its own, Mega Metal Kerrang! The magazine disseminated information about the metal music scene; in 2007, the senior VP of Roadrunner Records indicated that Metal Forces, along with similar publication Kick Ass, "was my Bible... the way I discovered new bands and fed my insatiable appetite for all things emerging in the underground".

In March 2012, Metal Forces launched their official website.

=== Controversy ===
In 1984, Metal Forces printed a review of black metal band Hellhammer so negative that the band's frontman, Thomas Gabriel Fischer, indicated the band would never play in England because of it. After forming a new band, Celtic Frost, Fischer continued to refuse requests for an interview with the magazine.

In 1986, former Metallica guitarist and founder of Megadeth, Dave Mustaine, complained about the magazine because it named his successor at Metallica, Kirk Hammett, the number 1 in the readers' poll of Metal Forces. The voting was based on a demo recording of No Life 'Til Leather, which Mustaine had recorded rather than Hammett.

== Metal Forces Presents: Demolition – Scream Your Brains Out! ==
Metal Forces Presents: Demolition – Scream Your Brains Out!

Compilation album by various artists
- Released: 1988
- Genre: Thrash metal
- Label: Chain Reaction Records

=== Track listing ===
1. "Violent Slaughter" – Leviathan
2. "Chainsaw Massacre" – Hobbs' Angel of Death
3. "War for Freedom" – Aftermath
4. "Imprisoned" – Anacrusis
5. "Chemical Dependency" – Atrophy
6. "Leviathan" – Leviathan
7. "Satan's Crusade" – Hobbs' Angel of Death
8. "When Will You Die" – Aftermath
9. "Disembowled/Annihilation Complete" – Anacrusis
10. "Preacher, Preacher" – Atrophy
