= Aftermath (American band) =

American thrash metal band

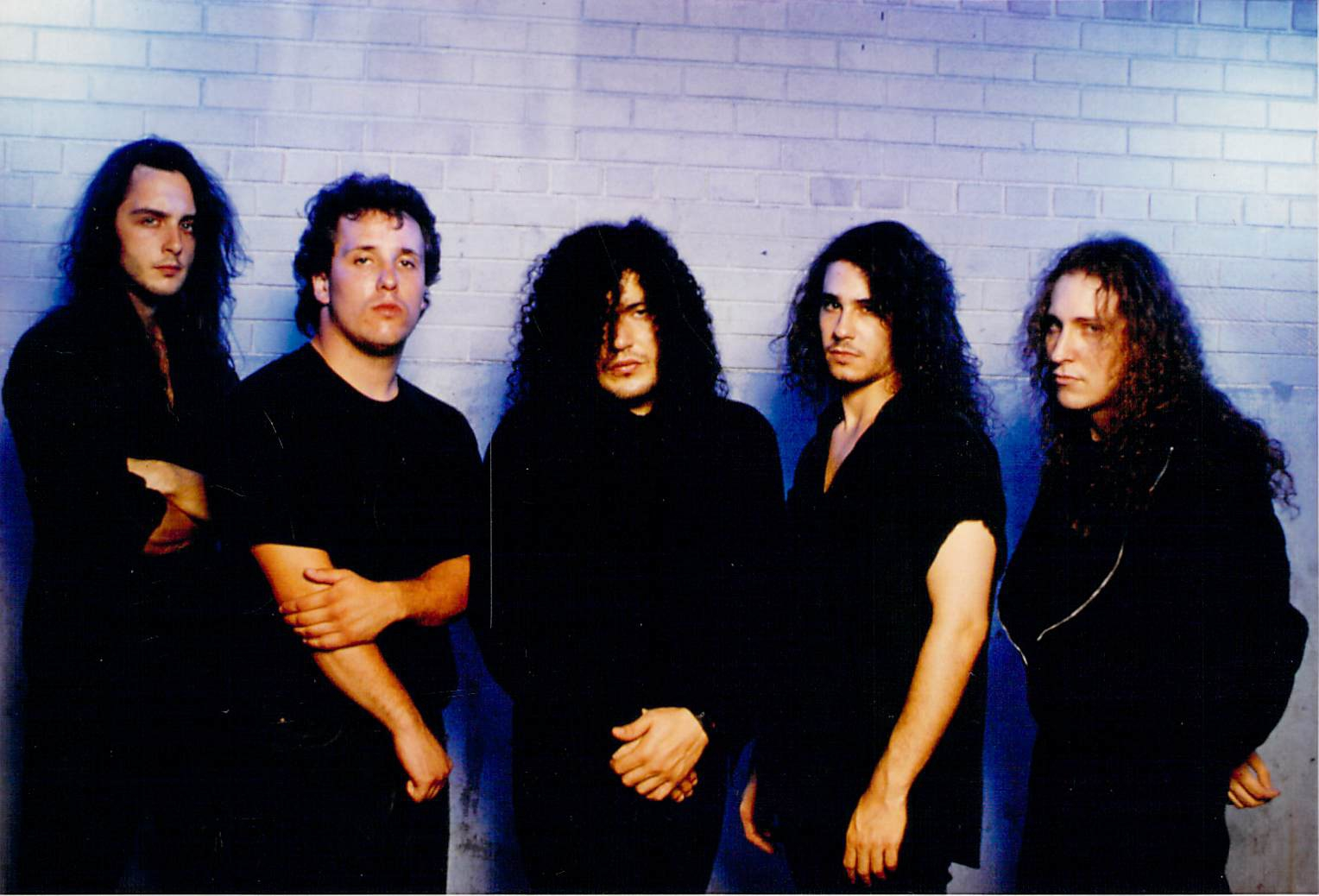
- L–R: Chris Waldron, Ray Schmidt, Kyriakos (Charlie) Tsiolis, Steve Sacco, John Lovette

Background information
- Origin: Chicago, Illinois, U.S.
- Genres: Thrash metal; technical thrash metal; progressive metal
- Years active: 1985–1996, 2014–present
- Labels: Zoid, Thermometer, Black Lotus, Area Death, Shadow Kingdom, Divebomb, The Label Group, InGrooves
- Members: Kyriakos Tsiolis; Steve Sacco; Ray Schmidt; George Nektarios Lagis
- Past members: Adam; Danny Vega; Chris Waldron; John Lovette

Aftermath is an American thrash metal band from Chicago that formed in 1985. They have released three studio albums under two monikers and been involved in several compilation projects. They subsequently changed their name to Mother God Moviestar in 1998 after a trademark dispute with Dr. Dre in which the court found that both could use the name. The band reformed as Aftermath in 2015.

== History ==
Aftermath was a Chicago-based thrash metal band during the 1980s and 1990s. Its demos landed them in metal magazines, including Kerrang!, Metal Hammer, RIP Magazine, Raw, and Metal Forces.

Its Words that Echo Fear demo was selected as one of Kerrang! 's Top 10 demos of 1990. The band's debut Eyes of Tomorrow has been released by multiple labels during the years and their demos continue to generate interest and fans around the world evidenced by the two reissues on Shadow Kingdom Records and Divebomb Records.

Having reunited in 2015, the band played the Ragnarokkr Metal Apocalypse festival in Chicago in May and Headbanger's Open Air festival in Hamburg, Germany in July. Celebrating 30 years since their formation, the band reissued their Eyes of Tomorrow debut album on Shadow Kingdom Records on September 4, 2015. The remastered version by Paul Logus (Pantera, Anthrax) includes an expanded booklet and four bonus tracks. In October, Divebomb Records reissued Killing the Future along with five bonus tracks and expanded booklet, once again remastered by Paul Logus .

=== 1985–1989: Early years and demos ===
Chicago based Aftermath, fronted by the Greece born Kyriakos "Charlie" Tsiolis, formed in October 1985 when Charlie and his schoolmate Steve Sacco (guitar) got together. This early incarnation with Adam (bass) and Ray Schmidt (drums) issued their first demo called 'Sentenced To Death' in 1986 featuring 'Sentenced to Death', 'Revenge', 'Shotgun' and 'The Aftermath'.

In 1987, they unleashed their second demo entitled 'Killing The Future' featuring the tracks 'When Will You Die', 'Going No Place', 'Chaos', 'Meltdown' and 'War For Freedom'.

The tracks "War For Freedom" and "When Will You Die" were both featured on the British 'Metal Forces' magazine compilation LP 'Demolition: Scream Your Brains Out' in 1988 Metal Forces. The LP featured tracks from Leviathan (Chris Barnes (Six Feet Under) on vocals), Hobbs' Angel Of Death, Anacrusis & Atrophy. The appearance on the Metal Forces' compilation further expanded the band's international appeal.

By 1988, the musical direction was changing, and Adam's raw and simple bass lines would soon be replaced with complex and technical bass parts handled at first by John Lovette. Ironically, John never played bass on any Aftermath recording and was not even a bass player. However, he wanted to join the band so badly, he came to the audition with a friend's bass he had just started to play. The speed and complex playing he displayed was something none of the members had seen before on bass. He landed the gig that day. When the band decided it was time to add a second guitarist, Lovette told his bandmates of his desire to switch to guitar and for the first time he came clean, he was a guitar player pretending to be a bass player all along. His guitar skills surpassed his bass playing, the band found its second guitar player, but unfortunately, the search for a bass player was back on. Luckily, the search (for the time being, anyway) ended with Danny Vega. His playing complemented the guitar playing of Lovette and Sacco and worked with Schmidt's drumming. With Lovette handling most songwriting duties, Aftermath was about to undergo a musical change.

By 1989, that change brought on by Lovette's writing and the band's musical tastes and stylings had slowed and matured as evidenced by the release of the underground classic demo 'Words That Echo Fear'.

=== 1990–1997: Eyes of Tomorrow saga ===
In 1990, based on the international success of the Words that Echo Fear demo, the metal label RoadRacer Records (a subsidiary of Roadrunner Records) approached the band for a demo deal, which resulted in a live four-track demo featuring the songs "Eyes of Tomorrow", "Afraid Of Time", "The Act Of Unspoken Wisdom" and "Reflecting Pictures". Negotiations eventually broke down and Aftermath signed to New York City's Big Chief Records. The label's collapse halfway through the recording sessions led to a long delay in finishing the record. While the band struggled to pay the studio bill, the album the band started to record in 1990 would not see the light of day for four years. The experience left the band reeling and forced them to issue the album under their own steam with the help of their manager through Zoid Recordings in 1994. Four years had passed since the initial recordings for the record "Eyes Of Tomorrow" and the scene had changed.

The album was subsequently re-released on Thermometer Sound Surface / Zoid and released yet again four years later on Black Lotus Records in a remastered version. Area Death Productions remastered the record once again as part of their box set called 25 Years of Chaos released in 2011. In 2015, Shadow Kingdom Records reissued the record with bonus tracks as part of a 2-CD set with expanded artwork, new cover art treatment and remastered by Paul Logus.

=== Trademark dispute ===
Aftermath the act, lost a notable court case Tsiolis v. Interscope. Records. Inc., 946 F.Supp. 1344, 1349 (N.D.III. 1996) with Dr. Dre over the ownership of the name. Dre reported made a conciliatory offer of some $50,000 for rights to use the name but would go ahead and use it regardless. Fortunately for the band, this period of turmoil had built bridges with Interscope Records. After the name change to Mother God Moviestar, they signed to Interscope for the eponymous electro-metal debut of March 1998. The case has been studied in law schools around the nation related to the issue of trademark dilution.

The band is featured in Gary Sharpe-Young's A – Z of Thrash Metal.

== Discography ==
Demos

- Sentenced To Death (1986)
- Killing the Future (1987)
- Words that Echo Fear (1989)

Compilations

- Metal Forces' Scream Your Brains Out

Studio albums

- Eyes of Tomorrow (1994) Re-issued
- Mother God Moviestar (Interscope) 1998 under the name Mother God Moviestar
- There is Something Wrong (2019)
- No Time to Waste (The Label Group / Zoid Entertainment)

Re-releases

- 25 Years of Chaos – Box Set (Area Death Productions) (2010–11)
- When Will You Die (1986–1989) Vinyl (F.O.A.D Records) (2011)
- Eyes of Tomorrow (Shadow Kingdom Records) September 4, 2015
- Killing the Future (Divebomb Records) October 30, 2015
- There is Something Wrong (Zoid Entertainment) February 15, 2019 (European version on Sleaszy Rider Records)
- ‘’No Time To Waste” March 2023 (Zoid Entertainment / The Label Group)
