= Symphony No. 12 (Villa-Lobos) =

- by Heitor Villa-Lobos
- Villa-Lobos in June 1952
- Catalogue: W539
- Composed: 1957
- Dedication: Mindinha
- Published: 1957: Paris
- Publisher: Max Eschig
- Duration: 25 mins.
- Movements: 4

Premiere
- Date: 20 April 1958:
- Location: Lisner Auditorium, Washington, D. C.
- Conductor: Howard Mitchell
- Performers: National Symphony Orchestra

Symphony No. 12 is a composition by the Brazilian composer Heitor Villa-Lobos, written in 1957. A typical performance lasts about 25 minutes.

Villa-Lobos composed his Twelfth Symphony in New York in 1957, completing it on his seventieth birthday, 5 March 1957. The score is dedicated to Mindinha (Arminda Neves d'Almeida), the composer's companion for the last 23 years of his life.

It was first performed at Lisner Auditorium in Washington, DC, on 20 April 1958, by the National Symphony Orchestra, conducted by Howard Mitchell. The European premiere occurred soon after, in Brussels on 22 September 1958, by the Grand Orchestre Symphonique de la Radiodiffusion Nationale Belge, conducted by the composer.

== Analysis ==
The symphony consists of four movements:

1. Allegro non troppo
2. Adagio
3. Scherzo (Vivace)
4. Molto Allegro

The form of the first movement resembles a five-part rondo (ABACA) with a coda in which the main theme returns in augmentation.

The second movement is in a ternary form (ABA) and leads without break into the third movement.

Like the first movement, the scherzo is a five-part rondo, except that the returns of the main A section are in different keys, and the second occurrence is immediately after the first: A A' B C A''.

The finale is also in a modified five-part rondo form. As in the scherzo, the refrain returns in keys different from its initial appearance.
