= Symphony No. 1 (Frankel) =

The Symphony No. 1, Op. 33 was the first of eight symphonies composed by English composer Benjamin Frankel, written in 1958. It is a dodecaphonic symphony, deeply serious in tone. It was premiered on March 25, 1959 in Lünen by the Westphalia Symphony conducted by Hubert Reichert, while the British premiere took place in the 1960 Cheltenham Festival. Lasting for c. 25 minutes, it consists of three movements, with two moderate outer movements framing an energetic scherzo.

1. Moderato
2. Molto ritmico, robusto
3. Lento

== Recordings ==
- Queensland Symphony – Werner Andreas Albert. CPO, 1990.
