= Philips Pavilion =

Demolished building in Brussels, Belgium

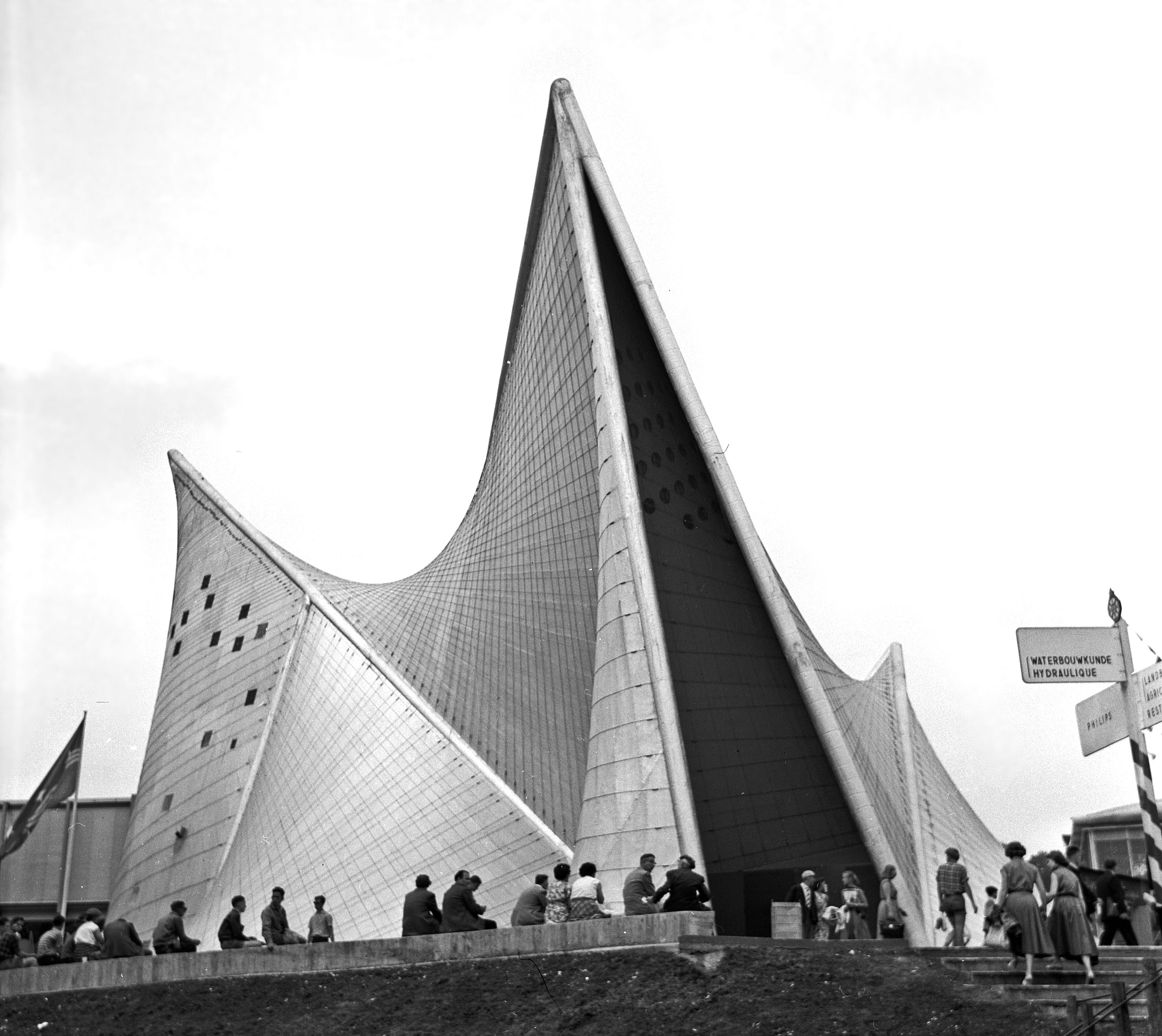
- The Philips Pavilion during the 1958 Brussels World's Fair (Expo 58)
- Interactive map of the Philips Pavilion area

General information
- Type: Pavilion
- Architectural style: Modernism
- Location: 1020 Laeken, City of Brussels, Brussels-Capital Region, Belgium
- Opened: 1958
- Demolished: 1959

Technical details
- Material: Reinforced concrete

Design and construction
- Architect: Iannis Xenakis
- Architecture firm: Le Corbusier

The Philips Pavilion (French: Pavillon Philips; Dutch: Philipspaviljoen) was a modernist pavilion in Brussels, Belgium, constructed for the 1958 Brussels World's Fair (Expo 58). Commissioned by electronics manufacturer Philips and designed by the office of Le Corbusier, it was built to house a multimedia spectacle that celebrated postwar technological progress. Because Le Corbusier was busy with the planning of Chandigarh, much of the project management was assigned to Iannis Xenakis, who was also an experimental composer and was influenced in the design by his composition Metastaseis.

Le Corbusier's floor plan was "a vague diagram of a stomach with two narrow entrances at either end". To this outline, Xenakis added the "tent-like enclosure" composed of prefabricated concrete panels and connecting cables. Xenakis would later go on to split with Le Corbusier over credit for the pavilion's development.

The reinforced concrete pavilion was a cluster of nine hyperbolic paraboloids in which Edgard Varèse's Poème électronique was spatialized by sound projectionists using telephone dials. To this purpose 325 loudspeakers were set into the walls; the latter were coated in asbestos, giving them a textured look. Varèse, assisted by Philips engineers, worked in a facility provided by Philips in the Strijp III complex in Eindhoven from September 1957 to April 1958. They drew up a detailed spatialization scheme for the entire piece, which made great use of the pavilion's physical layout, especially its height. The asbestos hardened the walls, which created a cavernous acoustic. As audiences entered and exited the building, Xenakis's musique concrète composition Concret PH was heard.

The building, planned to be temporary from the outset, was demolished on 30 January 1959. The European Union later funded a virtual recreation of the Philips Pavilion, which was chaired by Vincenzo Lombardi from the University of Turin.

Arseniusz Romanowicz's Warszawa Ochota train station in Poland is supposedly inspired by the Philips Pavilion.

== Construction ==
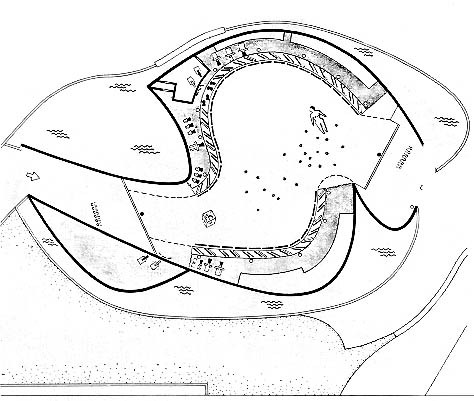
Floor plan

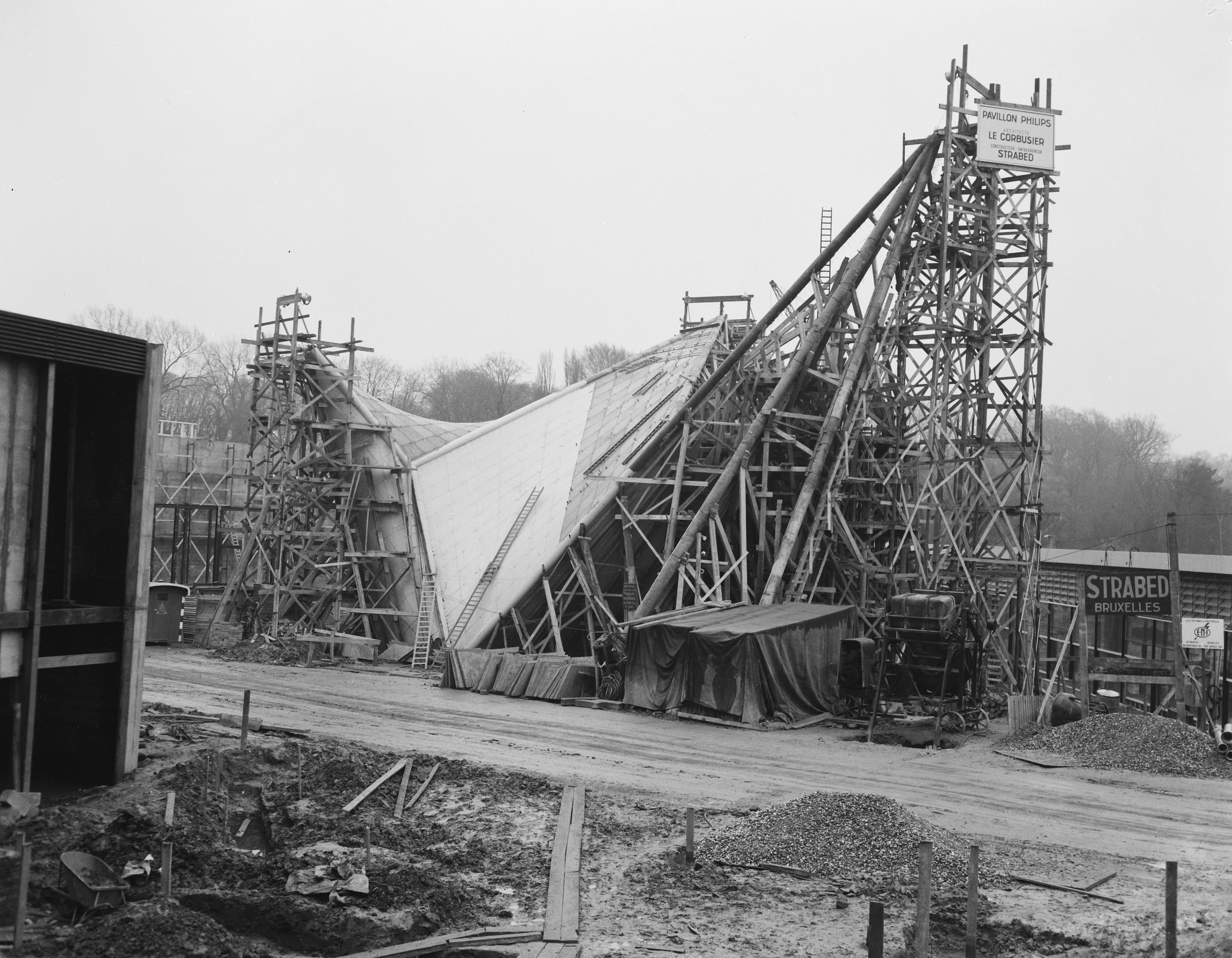
During construction (13 November 1957)

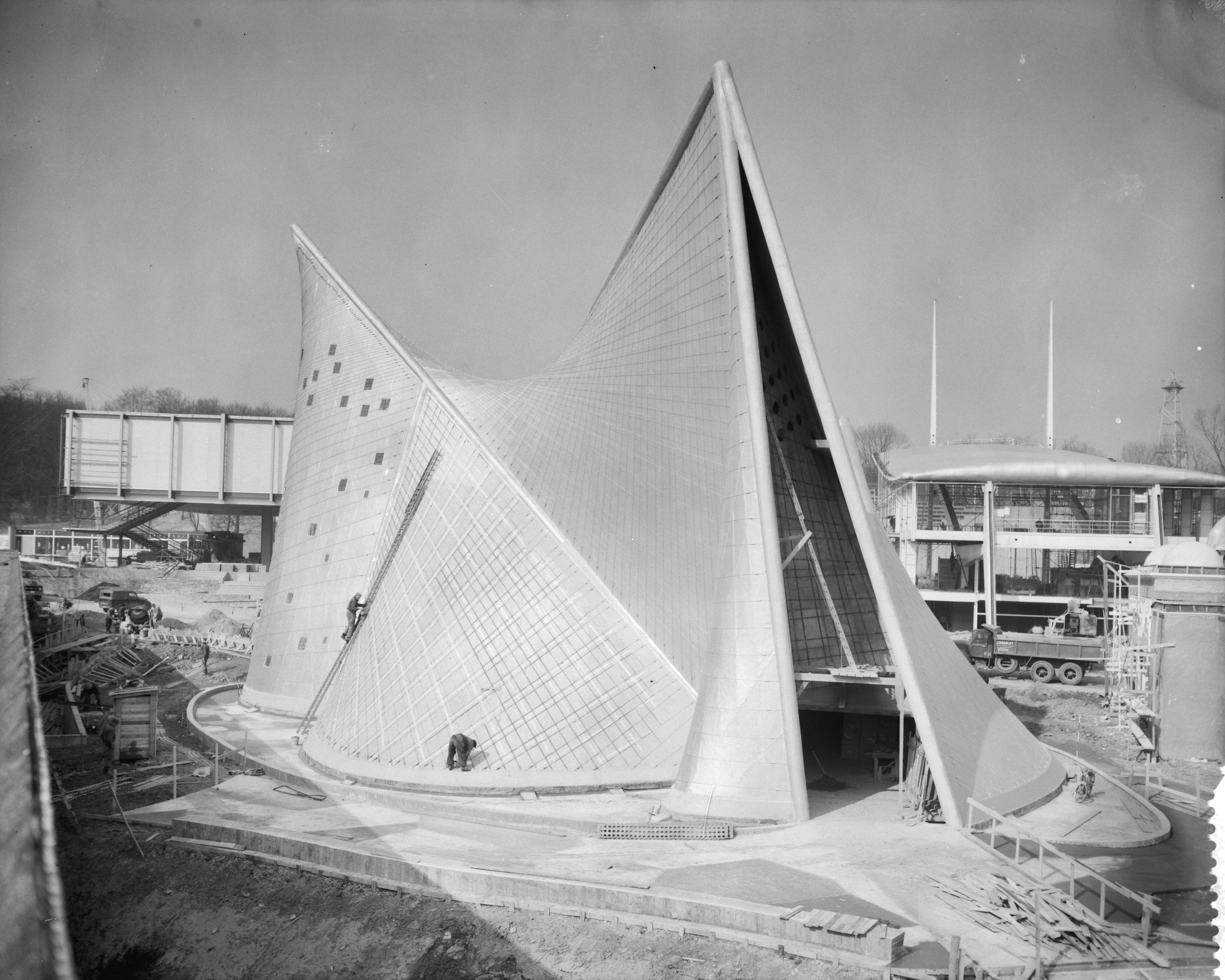
Near opening (20 March 1958)
