= Pod sjajem zvezda =

Single by Vokalni kvartet Predraga Ivanovića

from the album Pod sjajem zvezda
- A-side: "Pod sjajem zvezda"
- Released: 1978
- Genre: Vocal jazz, Schlager
- Label: PGP RTB
- Songwriter(s): P. Ivanović; M. Savić

"Pod sjajem zvezda" (also known as "Pod sjajem zvezda ove noći") (Serbian for "Under the Starlight This Night") is a Serbian evergreen song composed in 1958, by Predrag Ivanović, with lyrics by Mirjana Savić and recorded by Serbian quartet Vokalni kvartet Predraga Ivanovića for the soundtrack of the 1960 Ljubav i moda film. Song is later released on the group album with the same name, in 1978. The song became popular in former Yugoslavia and performed by many artists.
