= Concret PH =

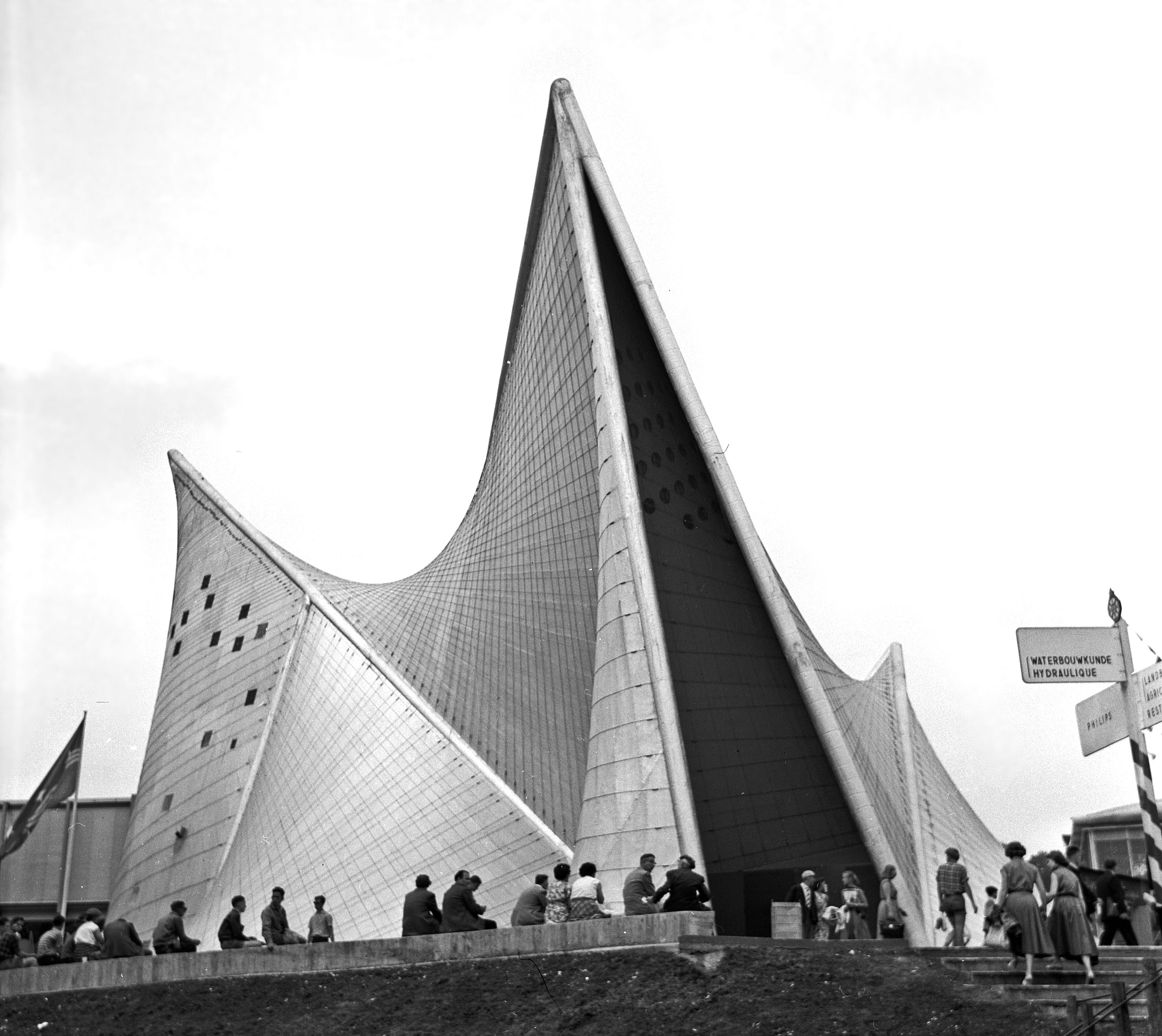
The Philips Pavilion during the 1958 Brussels World's Fair (Expo 58)

Concret PH (1958) is a musique concrète piece by Iannis Xenakis, originally created for the Philips Pavilion (designed by Xenakis as Le Corbusier's assistant) at the 1958 Brussels World's Fair (Expo 58) and heard as audiences entered and exited the building (PH = paraboloïdes hyperboliques, concret = reinforced concrete/musique concrète). Edgard Varèse's Poème électronique was played once they were inside the building.

At 2 1/2 minutes long and focused primarily on density, "Concret PH" was created in the Philips office in Paris (Varèse having exclusive access to the studio with spatialization capabilities established at the Philips Research Laboratories in Eindhoven) or at the Groupe de Recherches Musicales. The only sound source is burning charcoal, cut into one-second fragments, with numerous transpositions and overdubs, a granular texture from which Xenakis creates a continuum. Using slight manipulation, the main techniques were splicing, tape speed change, and mixing. The piece was composed intuitively, rather than being guided by mathematical processes. In the Philips Pavilion, it was projected over 425 loudspeakers through an 11-channel sound system. Xenakis described the effect as "lines of sound moving in complex paths from point to point in space, like needles darting from everywhere."

Start with a sound made up of many particles, then see how you can make it change imperceptibly, growing and developing, until an entirely new sound results... This was in defiance of the usual manner of working with concrète sounds. Most of the musique concrète which had been produced up to the time of "Concret PH" is full of many abrupt changes and juxtaposed sections without transitions. This happened because the original recorded sounds used by the composers consisted of a block of one kind of sound, then a block of another, and did not extend beyond this. I seek extremely rich sound (many high overtones) that have a long duration, yet with much internal change and variety. Also, I explore the realm of extremely faint sounds highly amplified. There is usually no electronic alteration of the original sound, since an operation such as filtering diminished the richness.

— Xenakis, Program notes, Nonesuch recording H-71246 quoted
