= Four Essays =

Four Essays (Cztery Eseje) is an orchestral composition by Polish composer Tadeusz Baird written in 1958. It was prized in the 1959 UNESCO Rostrum of Composers, the first of three works by Baird to attain this distinction, and it also won the Grzegorz Fitelberg Competition. The first performance of this work took place at the second Warsaw Autumn Festival in 1960, performed by the Warsaw Philharmonic conducted by Witold Rowicki. Each of the four movements is scored for different instrumental combinations, and they are marked as follows:

1. Molto adagio
2. Allegretto grazioso
3. Allegro
4. Molto adagio (improvisando e rubato)

Essay 1 is orchestrated for string (frequently solo), and two harps. Essay 2 is scored for woodwind, timpani, percussion, celesta, xylophone, two harps, piano and strings. The 3rd essay is written for brass, timpani, percussion, bells, xylophone, celesta and two pianos. The 4th essay uses woodwind, timpani, celesta, two harps, two pianos and strings.

== Discography ==
- Warsaw Philharmonic – Witold Rowicki. Muza (later reissued by Philips).
