= Werner Andreas Albert =

German-born Australian conductor (1935–2019)

Werner Andreas Albert (10 January 1935 – 10 November 2019) was a German-born Australian conductor.

== Personal life ==
Albert was born in Weinheim. He began his studies in musicology and history, and later studied conducting with Herbert von Karajan and Hans Rosbaud. He became an Australian citizen in the late 1990s.

== Career ==
After Albert's 1961 debut with the Heidelberg Chamber Orchestra, he became chief conductor of the Nordwestdeutsche Philharmonie. He later served as chief conductor of the Gulbenkian Orchestra in Lisbon and the Nuremberg Symphony in Germany. He was chief conductor of the Bavarian State Youth Orchestra for more than 20 years and was also senior lecturer of the Meistersinger Conservatorium in Nuremberg. He was also the permanent guest conductor of the Radio Symphony Orchestras in Cologne, Frankfurt, and Berlin, and of the Bamberg Symphony.

Since 1981, Albert regularly conducted in Australia. He was named principal conductor of the Queensland Symphony Orchestra, and he conducted all six Symphony Australia orchestras. Albert toured in the United States, South America, China, Japan, and most European countries. He conducted in Beijing, and at Triphony Hall and Tokyo Opera City Concert Hall in Japan with the New Japan Philharmonic and the Tokyo City Symphony Orchestra.

Albert made over 600 recordings for radio, and approximately 100 CDs. In the process, he earned the distinction of the most recorded artist in Germany. He recorded the complete orchestral repertoire of Paul Hindemith, Erich Wolfgang Korngold, Hans Pfitzner, and Benjamin Frankel. He had a project on recordings and live performances of Siegfried Wagner, son of Richard Wagner.

Albert directed the Australian Broadcasting Corporation’s Conducting Workshop for many years, as well as teaching selected Masters’ students at the University of Queensland, where he was an adjunct professor. He was Principal Guest Conductor of the Southern Sinfonia since 2007.

== Recognition ==
Albert was recognized by both the German Federal and Bavarian State Governments for his dedication to music. He held the title of member of the German Federal Cross of Merit, Erste Klasse (the German equivalent of the British Order of Merit), as well as the Bavarian Order of Merit.
