= HellsBelles =

English heavy metal band

- Origin: England
- Genres: Heavy metal
- Years active: 1984–1987, 1998–present
- Labels: Castle Communications, Raw Power, Elap, Pickwick
- Members: Paul Quigley; Caddavirr; O'Jeopardoso; St Eval Denies
- Past members: Hell's Belles; Paul Quigley; Pooch Spiv; Gareth Holder; Jon Archer; Lyndsay Bridgwater
- Website: www.hellsbelles.co.uk

HellsBelles (formerly known as Hell's Belles) is a heavy metal band from England active from 1984 to 1987 and 1998 to present, considered part of the latter stages of the new wave of British heavy metal (NWOBHM).

== 1980s – Hell's Belles ==
They gained a considerable following and achieved major airplay and media coverage, with radio plays on Tommy Vance's BBC Radio 1 Friday Rock Show, on lead singer Paul Quigley's Mancunian friend Terry Christian's award-winning radio show 'Barbed Wireless' on BBC Radio Derby during the band's 80s heyday, as well as on pirate rock station Alice's Restaurant Rock Radio.

In the press, the band received rave coverage for both their live performances and recordings in metal magazines Kerrang! and Metal Forces.

They were unusual for their time for playing a distinct mix of punk rock and more traditional heavy metal, a genre subsequently emulated by many bands such as Metallica and others. The punk element came from the ex-Discharge and The Varukers drummer Garry Maloney, who had played on Discharge's 1982 seminal hardcore album Hear Nothing See Nothing Say Nothing and guitarist Pooch (born Peter Purtill), previously a guitarist for Discharge following the departure of Bones to join his brother in Broken Bones. Gareth Holder was a former member of Leamington Spa-based punk band The Shapes.

The heavy metal and classic rock influence was provided by vocalist/guitarist/lyricist Paul Quigley, formerly of seminal NWOBHM heavy rock band SwingFire with former The Hoax drummer Dave Raeburn and bassist Mick Paul. Quigley later formed London-based A.M. and later RAAM with former Metal Mirror guitarist Chris Haggerty (1960–2004). Quigley subsequently founded London scene glam rock band BellaDonna in 1987 who went on to perform with ex-drummer of Tokyo Blade, Andy 'A.D. Dynamite' Parsons (who later went on to play with former Iron Maiden vocalist Paul Di'Anno in Battlezone).

Drummer Anthony 'Spiv' Smith was previously a member of Brute Force, and replaced D-beat pioneer Discharge drummer Garry Maloney in April 1984 shortly after the band's inception. Maloney subsequently rejoined Cal (born Kelvin Morris) in Discharge for their 'Grave New World' and 'Massacre Divine' albums.

Paul Quigley also acted in the lead role in two promo videos for Bronze Records' heavy metal band Girlschool in their singles "20th Century Boy", a cover version of the Marc Bolan hit of the 1970s, and "Play Dirty", which both featured on Girlschool's 1983 album of the same name, produced by Slade's Noddy Holder and Jimmy Lea. Paul Quigley's acting also appeared on MTV favourite cartoon comedy show Beavis and Butthead which featured the "Play Dirty" Girlschool video.

Hell's Belles released one full-length album Hell's Belles (RAWLP015) in 1986, and one single "Barricades" on both 7" and 12" format in the same year (RAWSS001/RAWTS001), during their span on Castle Communications' Raw Power label. They also featured with two tracks on Castle's Metal Killers Kollection Volume 1 & 2, as well as other rock compilations 'Rock Legends' and 'Rock Classics' on other record labels.

Hell's Belles' guest keyboard player, classically trained Lyndsay Bridgwater had formerly been the touring keyboard player for former Black Sabbath lead vocalist Ozzy Osbourne the previous year on both the Diary of a Madman tour with Randy Rhoads, Bob Daisley and Lee Kerslake, and then on Ozzy's Speak of the Devil tour with Brad Gillis replacing Randy Rhoads on guitar after his untimely passing in a plane accident on the U.S. tour, and with Rudy Sarzo on bass. Bridgwater played the keyboard solo on the Hell's Belles single Barricades and the synth parts on album track Strangelove and Looks Like Love, which Metallica's James Hetfield used Quigley's lyrics from that song using them in a similar slow-paced section where both sing 'sleep with one eye open' in Metallica's multi-platinum-selling track 'Enter Sandman' on their Black album. Metallica's Hetfield, Ulrich and Burton and Megadeth's Dave Mustaine all had been long-time Discharge admirers in the early days, and used to go to Discharge gigs in the US in the early 1980s, and had subsequently recorded two of Discharge's songs for their Garage covers album work.

Discharge's Cal (Kelvin Morris) also later 'borrowed' Paul Quigley's 1986 'Overload' song title in no less than two other, subsequent album tracks: 'Fantasy Overload' from the Discharge album 'Shootin' Up The World' in 1993, and, 'Hype Overload' on the 'Discharge' 2002 album, such was the influence of Paul Quigley's lyrical symbolism.

Soon after the release of the first album in 1986, Holder left the band and was replaced by bassist Jon Archer in late 1986. This line-up dissolved as a working band shortly thereafter.

== 2000s – HellsBelles ==
Paul Quigley reformed a new band called 'HellsBelles' (one word, no apostrophes) in 1998.

HellsBelles released two new singles in 2011, "Abyssinian Demesne" and "(Why Did They Kill) Joe Hill", "Gone but Not Forgotten" in January 2013.

== Current members ==
- Paul Quigley 'The Belle Lord' - vocals, guitars, keyboards
- Caddavirr - bass
- O'Jeopardoso - guitar
- St Eval Denies - drums

== Original members ==
- Paul Quigley - vocals
- Peter "Pooch" Purtill - guitar
- Gareth Holder - bass

== Other members ==
- Anthony "Spiv" Smith - drums
- Jon Archer - bass
- Lyndsay Bridgwater - keyboards (on LP Hell's Belles - ex-Ozzy Osbourne, Blizzard of Oz, Budgie)

== See also ==
- List of new wave of British heavy metal bands
