= Benjamin Frankel =

British composer (1906–1973)

Benjamin Frankel (31 January 1906 – 12 February 1973) was a British composer. His best known pieces include a cycle of five string quartets, eight symphonies, and concertos for violin and viola. He was also notable for writing over 100 film scores and working as a big band arranger in the 1930s. During the last 15 years of his life, Frankel also developed his own style of 12-note composition that retained contact with tonality.

== Biography ==
Frankel was born in London on 31 January 1906, the son of Polish Jewish parents. He began to learn the violin at an early age, showing remarkable talent; at age 14, his piano-playing gifts attracted the attention of the American pianist and teacher Victor Benham (1867–1936) who persuaded his parents to let him study music full-time.

He spent six months in Germany in 1922, then returned to London, where he won a scholarship from the Worshipful Company of Musicians and attempted his first serious compositions while earning his income as a jazz violinist, pianist and arranger. Known then as Ben Frankel, his jazz work can be heard on recordings by Fred Elizalde's band. He also played violin with Carroll Gibbons and the Savoy Hotel Orpheans.

By the early 1930s, Frankel was in demand as an arranger and musical director in London, working with several dance bands. He wrote several popular dance band arrangements for Henry Hall's BBC Dance Orchestra, including "Learn To Croon", "Don't Blame Me", "Weep No More My Baby", "April in Paris" and "In Town Tonight". He wrote many arrangements and scores for theatre and film music but gave up theatre work in 1944.

He did, however, retain an interest in film composing until his death, writing over 100 scores. These included The Seventh Veil (1945), The Man in the White Suit (1951), The Importance of Being Earnest (1952), The Night of the Iguana (1964), and Battle of the Bulge (1965), as well as the first British (partly) serial film score, to The Curse of the Werewolf (1961).

From 1941 until 1952 he was a member of the Communist Party of Great Britain, but resigned his membership in protest against the Slánský trial.

During and after the war Frankel started to become widely known as a composer of works in traditional classical form. One of the first to gain attention was the Sonata No 1 for solo violin of 1942, which was dedicated to the Austrian-born violinist and viola player Max Rostal. Rostal made the premiere recording in 1944.

He went on to perform Frankel's most famous work, the Violin Concerto "in memory of 'the six million'" (a reference to the Jews murdered during the Holocaust), commissioned for the 1951 Festival of Britain, and was the soloist in the Viola Concerto for BBC radio broadcasts in 1970 and 1972. The core of Frankel's output are the eight symphonies (composed between 1958 and 1971) and the five string quartets (composed between 1945 and 1965). His friend Hans Keller was a champion of his concert music and did much to promote its performance at home and abroad.

Born and raised in Hammersmith, Frankel lived in London for many years, most notably at 17 Soho Square between 1953 and 1957, where he was the host of a circle of artists including the poet Cecil Day Lewis and film director Anthony Asquith. From 1952 there was also a house in Sussex, Rodmell Hiil, Rodmell, near Lewes. The writer Leonard Woolf lived next door. In 1958 he re-located to Locarno in Switzerland. He married three times: first in 1932 to Joyce Stanmore Rayner (divorced 1944), then to Phyllis Anna Leat (1944 until her death in 1967), and finally to Xenia Hamilton-Kennaway in 1972, not long before his death. There were two sons and one daughter by the first marriage.

Frankel died in London on 12 February 1973 while working on the three-act opera Marching Song and a ninth symphony, which had been commissioned by the BBC. When he died, Marching Song had been completed in short score; it was orchestrated by Buxton Orr, a composer who had studied with Frankel and whose advocacy has been at least partly responsible for the revival of interest in his works.

== Posthumous reputation ==
In the twenty years following his death, Frankel's works were almost completely neglected. Thea King's landmark recording of the Clarinet Quintet with the Britten Quartet, released in 1991, was the first commercial recording of his music since his death. A major turning point, however, came in the mid-1990s when German record company CPO (Classic Produktion Osnabrück, since bought by JPC) decided to partner with the Australian Broadcasting Corporation to record Frankel's complete oeuvre. This allowed for the first time an appraisal of his output. CPO recorded all the symphonies (conducted by Werner Andreas Albert) and all the string quartets (by the Nomos Quartet), and in 1998 issued the world premiere recordings of the Violin Concerto, Viola Concerto and Serenata Concertante. With recordings now available, BBC Radio 3 featured him as the Composer of the Week, first in 1996 and again in 2006.

== Selected works ==
Symphonies

- Symphony No. 1 – Op. 33, three movements (1958)
- Symphony No. 2 – Op. 38, three movements (1962)
- Symphony No. 3 – Op. 40, one movement (1964)
- Symphony No. 4 – Op. 44, three movements (1966)
- Symphony No. 5 – Op. 46, three movements (1967)
- Symphony No. 6 – Op. 49, five movements (1969)
- Symphony No. 7 – Op. 50, four movements (1970)
- Symphony No. 8 – Op. 53, four movements (1971)

Concertos

- Violin Concerto To the memory of the six million, Op. 24, four movements (1951)
- Serenata Concertante for piano trio and orchestra, one movement (in parts), Op. 37 (1960)
- Viola Concerto, Op. 45, three movements (1967)

Orchestral

- Three Sketches for Strings (originally for quartet), Op. 2 (1920s?)
- Solemn Speech and Discussion for string orchestra, Op. 11 (1941)
- Youth Music, four pieces for small orchestra, Op. 12
- May Day (a panorama, prelude for orchestra), Op. 22 (dedicated to Hugo Rignold) (1948 – 27 December 1949)
- Mephistopheles' Serenade and Dance, Op. 25 (1952)
- Concertante lirico for string orchestra, Op. 27 (1953)
- Shakespeare Overture, Op. 29
- Overture to a Ceremony, Op. 51

Chamber

- Three Piano Studies, Op. 1 (1926)
- String Trio no. 1, Op. 3
- Sonata for Viola Solo, Op. 7 (early 1930s)
- Trio for Clarinet, Cello and Piano, Op. 10, three movements (1940)
- Violin Solo Sonata No. 1, Op. 13 (before 1943)
- String Quartet No. 1, Op. 14, four movements (ca. 1944 – 1945)
- String Quartet No. 2, Op. 15, five movements (1944)
- String Quartet No. 3, Op. 18, five movements (ca. 1947)
- Early Morning Music, trio for oboe, clarinet and bassoon, three movements (1948)
- String Quartet No. 4, Op. 21, four movements (ca. 1949)
- Quartet for Piano and Strings, Op. 26, three movements (issued ca. 1962 but written during the 1950s)
- Quintet for Clarinet and Strings, Op. 28, three movements (1956)
- Inventions in Major/Minor Modes, cello and piano, Op. 31
- String Trio No. 2, Op. 34, three movements (c. 1960)
- Cinque Pezzi Notturni for eleven instruments, Op. 35, five pieces (1959)
- Violin Solo Sonata No. 2, Op. 39, three movements (1962)
- Pezzi pianissimi for clarinet cello and piano, Op. 41, four pieces (1964)
- String Quartet No. 5, Op. 43, five movements (1965)

Vocal

- The Aftermath, Op. 17, song cycle with orchestra (1947), words Robert Nichols
- Eight songs, Op. 32 (1959)

Film scores

- Radio Parade of 1935 (1935)
- No Monkey Business (1935)
- Music Hath Charms (1935)
- Love in Exile (1936)
- Public Nuisance No. 1 (1936)
- Flight from Folly (1945)
- The Seventh Veil (1945)
- The Years Between (1946)
- Dear Murderer (1947)
- Night Beat (1947)
- Bond Street (1948)
- Daybreak (1948)
- London Belongs to Me (1948)
- Trottie True (1948)
- The Chiltern Hundreds (1949)
- Give Us This Day (1949)
- Double Confession (1950)
- So Long at the Fair (1950)
- Night and the City, UK version (1950)
- The Clouded Yellow (1951)
- The Man in the White Suit (1951)
- Appointment with Venus (1951)
- Mr. Denning Drives North (1951)
- The Importance of Being Earnest (1952)
- The Net (1953)
- Always a Bride (1953)
- Malaga (1954)
- The Young Lovers (1954)
- Up to His Neck (1954)
- Aunt Clara (1954)
- A Kid for Two Farthings (1955)
- Storm Over the Nile (1955)
- The End of the Affair (1955)
- Footsteps in the Fog (1955)
- The Prisoner (1955)
- The Iron Petticoat (1956)
- Brothers in Law (1957)
- Happy Is the Bride (1958)
- Orders to Kill (1958)
- I Only Arsked! (1958)
- Libel (1959)
- Summer of the Seventeenth Doll (1959)
- Surprise Package (1960)
- The Curse of the Werewolf (1961)
- Guns of Darkness (1962)
- The Old Dark House (1963)
- The Night of the Iguana (1964)
- Battle of the Bulge (1965)
