= Fortuna (Brazilian singer) =

- Born: Fortunée Joyce Safdié; 1958 (age 67–68); São Paulo, Brazil
- Occupation: Vocalist
- Instrument: Vocals
- Years active: 1980–present
- Website: Official website

Fortunee Safdié Joyce (born c. 1958), known professionally as Fortuna, is a Brazilian singer-songwriter of Sephardic Jewish background, and a researcher of the Sephardic tradition since 1992.

Fortuna was born in São Paulo, Brazil. She has been studying the Sephardic repertoire since 1992. Fortuna has recorded seven CDs and one DVD since then. She has worked on a number of occasions with the Choir of the Monastery of the Monks of St Benedict in São Paulo, and with the Guri Choir, composed of children and adolescents in the city.

Fortuna sings mainly in Hebrew and Ladino, a language used by Sephardi Jews who inhabited the Iberian Peninsula until the fifteenth century, at which time they were expelled by the Catholic Monarchs and scattered through several countries of the Mediterranean basin.

== Discography ==
- 15 Years Collection (Coletânea 15 anos)
- At Ruth's House (Na casa da Ruth – CD and DVD)
- New World (Novo Mundo) – 2005
- Meeting (Encontros) – 2003
- Caelestia (CD and DVD) – 2001
- Mazal – 2000
- Mediterranean (Meditarrâneo) – 1998
- Songs (Cantigas) – 1998
- The First Time (La Prima Vez) – 1998
