= Howard Mitchell =

American conductor

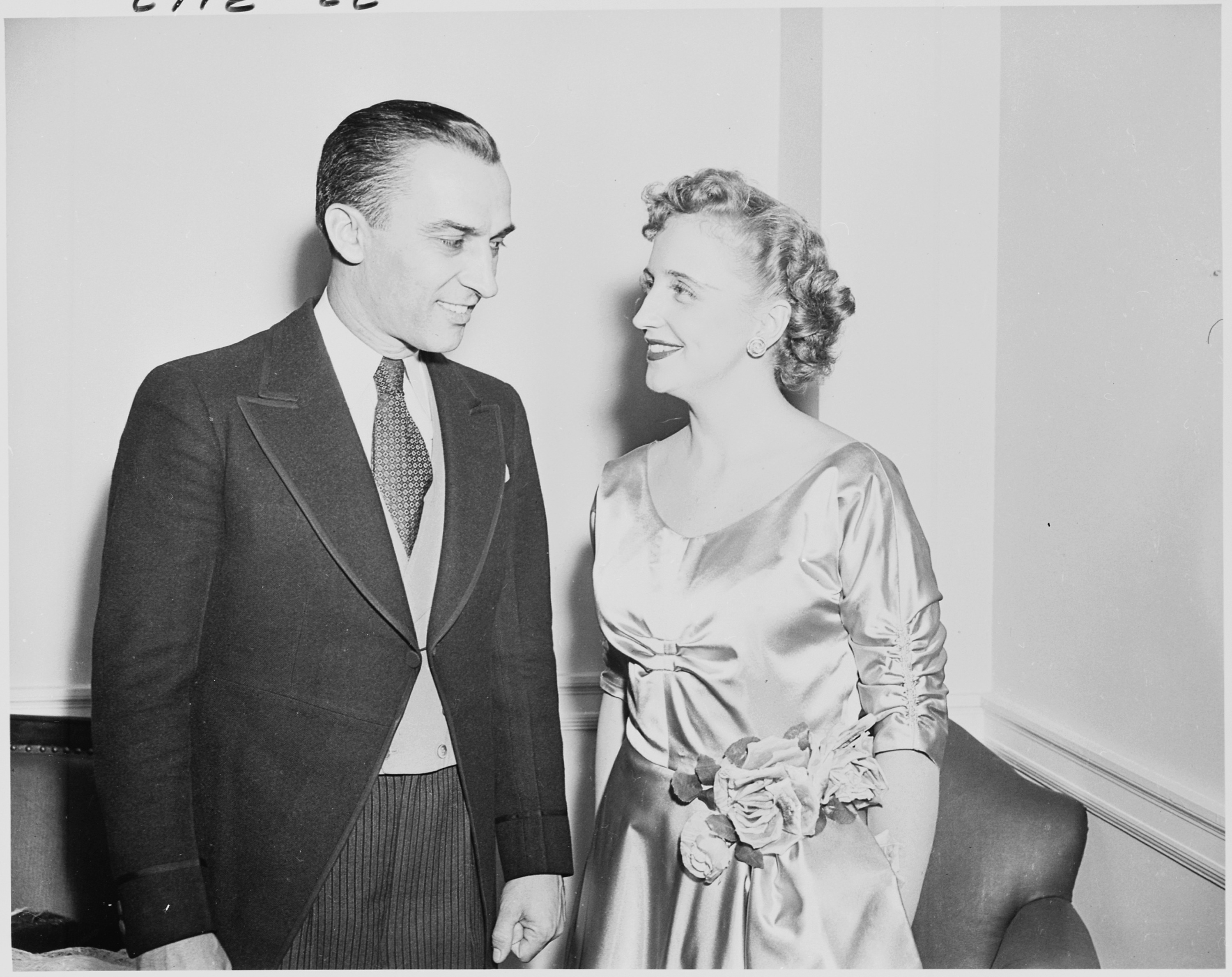
Mitchell with Margaret Truman (1949)

Howard Mitchell (11 March 1911 – 22 June 1988) was an American cellist and conductor who was born in Lyons, Nebraska and died in Ormond Beach, Florida. He was principal conductor of the National Symphony Orchestra from 1949 to 1969.

According to music critic Ted Libbey, Mitchell "personified the optimism that permeated Washington and America after World War II; he socialized, schmoozed and charmed the ladies of high Washington society, fitting right in, playing the role of music director as he played the cello. He saw the symphony as a necessary component of the city's social and cultural life, an institution to be supported by the enlightened few and used to educate and enrich the many."

Born in Nebraska, Mitchell attended the Peabody Conservatory and graduated with honors from the Curtis Institute of Music in 1935. Mitchell joined the National Symphony Orchestra as principal cellist in 1933. In addition to playing with the NSO, Mitchell made his conducting debut with the ensemble in 1941, and was named associate conductor in 1946. He was one of two candidates being considered to replace Hans Kindler, and in 1949 Mitchell began the longest tenure of any NSO music director to date, and one especially marked by his campaign to bring visiting conductors to Washington.

On the Westminster label Mitchell made recordings with his orchestra of music by Brahms (Violin Concerto with violinist Julian Olefsky), Copland (Appalachian Spring; Billy the Kid; Fanfare for the Common Man; El Salón México), Creston (Symphonies Nos. 2 & 3) and Shostakovich (Symphony No. 1; The Golden Age ballet suite).
