= The Shapes (British band) =

- Origin: Leamington Spa, Warwickshire, United Kingdom
- Genres: Punk rock, punk pathetique
- Years active: 1976–early 1980s, 2000–present
- Members: Seymour Bybuss; Brian Helicopter; Nigel Greenway; Nick Hadley; Charlie Pullen; Dave Gee; Steve Richards; Tim Jee

The Shapes were an English punk rock group that formed in Leamington Spa, Warwickshire in 1976. Different in many ways from their peers in the nascent punk subculture, they were known for eschewing the more political stances that were fashionable at the time, instead producing works of a cartoonish and absurdist nature. They were often compared to The Rezillos because of their Gerry Anderson-themed work.

== History ==
The band was formed by Seymour Bybuss (Ben Browton, vocals) and Brian Helicopter (Gareth Holder, bass guitar), who recruited Nigel Greenway (guitar), Nick Hadley (guitar), and Charlie Pullen (drums). This line-up played their debut gig at Coventry's University of Warwick supporting The Killjoys, and recorded a demo shortly after. They were offered a deal by EMI, but the record company wanted them to change their name to The Racket and mime to a pre-recorded song; This prompted Hadley to leave the band, and they carried on as The Shapes, with EMI bringing them together with songwriter Nick Brind of Joe Public, but this relationship broke down after Brind insisted on singing on the resulting tracks. Pullen was replaced by Dave Gee and the band returned to live performances and recorded more material before Greenway left the band. The remaining trio put an advert in the NME for new members, recruiting Steve Richards (lead guitar) as a result, and adding Gee's friend Tim Jee on guitar around the same time. Feeling that dealing with major record companies was a waste of time, they decided that they would record and release their material under their own independent label, Sofa Records, in order to retain control of their output.

The new line-up recorded four tracks at Woodbine Studios which were released as their vinyl debut in March 1979 as the EP Part of the Furniture on their own Sofa label. The début EP was given airplay by John Peel, who invited the band to record a session for his BBC Radio 1 show the following month. The EP sold sufficiently for the band to repress it twice, with total sales of 10,000 copies. A track off the EP was licensed to the Labels Unlimited compilation released by Cherry Red Records in 1979 also.

The band's humorous take on punk rock received comparisons to The Rezillos. They played support slots with The Fall, The Cure, and The Reaction, and were picked up by Terri Hooley's Good Vibrations label for the next single, "Blast Off". Hooley got the band on the bill of a concert by The Saints at the Royal Ulster Hall in Belfast, the band now without Richards. On their return to England they supported The Photos on tour, and recorded an EP for Good Vibrations (featuring "Jennifer the Conifer", "Let's Go (To Planet Skaro)", and "My House is a Satellite") but it was never released. The band split up in the early 1980s, with Holder already splitting his time between The Shapes and another band.

Tim Jee went on to join The Captain Black Solution, while Bybuss made several appearances on Eurotrash as transvestite nun 'Sister Bendy' and started a new band, The Ambassadors of Plush. Holder remained in the music business, playing and recording with Rogue Male and Hells Belles before moving to California to work as a professional skydiver. Richards went on to be a horse breeder, while Gee ran a recruitment agency in Northampton. Original guitarist Nigel Greenway left the music business and committed suicide some years later. Charlie Pullen is performing and has been drumming in rock covers band 'V8' since 1989.

Having achieved cult status, their records commanded high prices among collectors. This demand resulted in a belated release of a full-length retrospective of all of the singles, B-Sides, radio sessions and demos as the collection Songs for Sensible People on Overground Records in 1998. The independent label Hyped to Death have released Shapes tracks as part of their compilation series from 2002 onwards in the USA. The most recent release being in 2007 on their Messthetics series of releases. Overground Records re-released Songs for Sensible People in its original format in January 2008. In mid-2008, it was announced that The Shapes would reform in their original line-up for a tour of the United Kingdom to mark the 30 year anniversary of their first single in December 2008 supporting The Damned, UK Subs, Penetration, Radio Stars and Johnny Moped, amongst others.

In 2013, the Spanish independent label, Paramecium Records, approached the band with plans to re-release both the Part of the Furniture EP, and the second double A Side single Blastoff/Airline Disaster, in their original 7-inch vinyl format with original artwork, for a limited edition run of 500 records each. These releases, PAR-090 and PAR-010 respectively, proved popular enough for Overground Records to release a full-length 12-inch vinyl LP of remastered tracks in 2014, called More Songs for Sensible People, (OVER81LP).

This renewed interest prompted the band to once again reform in the original line-up of Bybuss/Helicopter/Jee/Richards/Gee to embark upon the "You'll Do Yourself a Mischief" tour in the UK in June 2014. Out of this tour was born 'A Film For Sensible People' filmed and edited by Phil Coupland of Ikonograph, and is a 20-minute documentary featuring interviews with the band and live songs recorded in Brighton in 2014.

In April 2016, the original line-up again toured the UK as the "We're Not Very Famous" tour. During this tour, they recorded their first new single since 1980, the double A side "Don't Play Tennis" and "We're Not Very Famous". They released this on their own Sofa Records label. (SEAT 004).

In March 2017, The Shapes toured Japan for the first time.

In August 2017, the band once again embarked on a short UK tour climaxing in their appearance at the Opera House, Blackpool as part of the 2017 Rebellion Festival.

== Discography ==
=== Albums ===
- Songs for Sensible People (1998), Overground

=== Singles, EPs ===
- Part of the Furniture EP (1979), Sofa
- "Blast Off" (1979), Good Vibrations

== See also ==
- Punk pathetique
