= Place Dalida =

Public square in Paris, France

Coordinates: 48°53′19″N 2°20′17″E

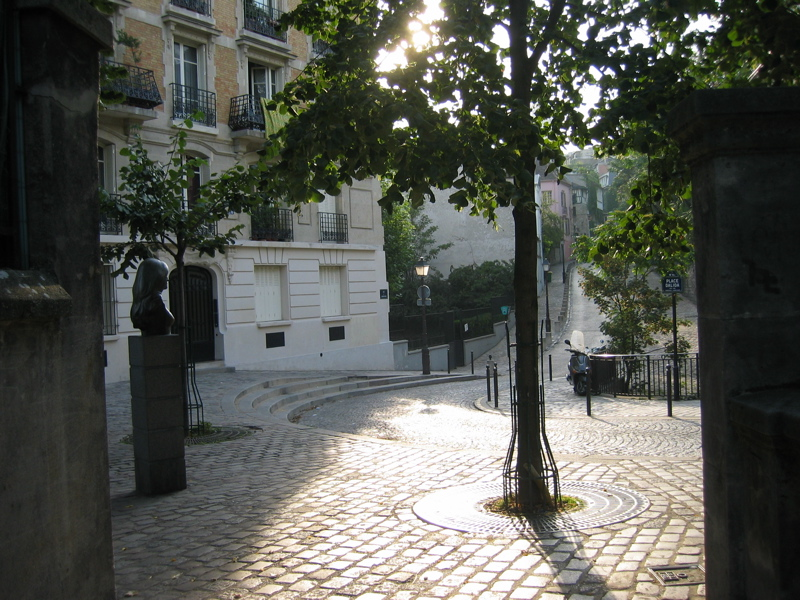
- Place Dalida and Rue de l'Abreuvoir Location of the Place Dalida in Paris
- Interactive map of Place Dalida
- Length: 19 m (62 ft)
- Width: 13 m (43 ft)
- Arrondissement: 18th
- Quarter: Grandes-Carrières

Construction
- Commissioned: December 5, 1996
- Inauguration: April 24, 1997

The Place Dalida (French pronunciation: [plas dalida]) is a square in Montmartre, in the 18th arrondissement of Paris, named after the Italian-French singer Dalida. Many fans and tourists visit the place to pay tribute to the artist.

== History ==
Dalida loved the neighbourhood of Montmartre, where she lived. To honour her, by decree on December 5, 1996, Paris City Hall created the Place Dalida. A bronze bust of the singer was added on 24 April 1997, to mark the 10th anniversary of her death.

== Description ==
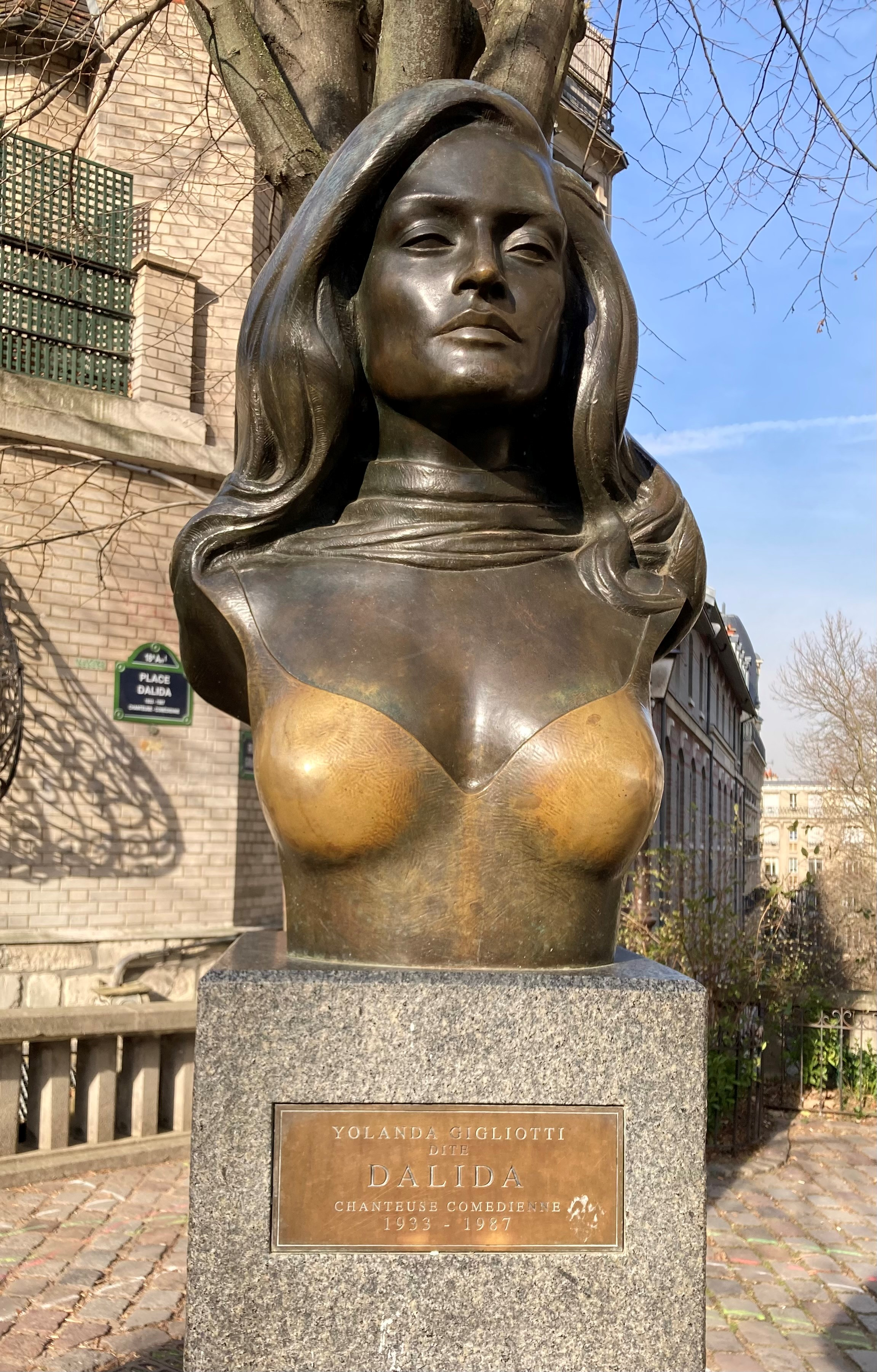
The bust of Dalida at the Place Dalida

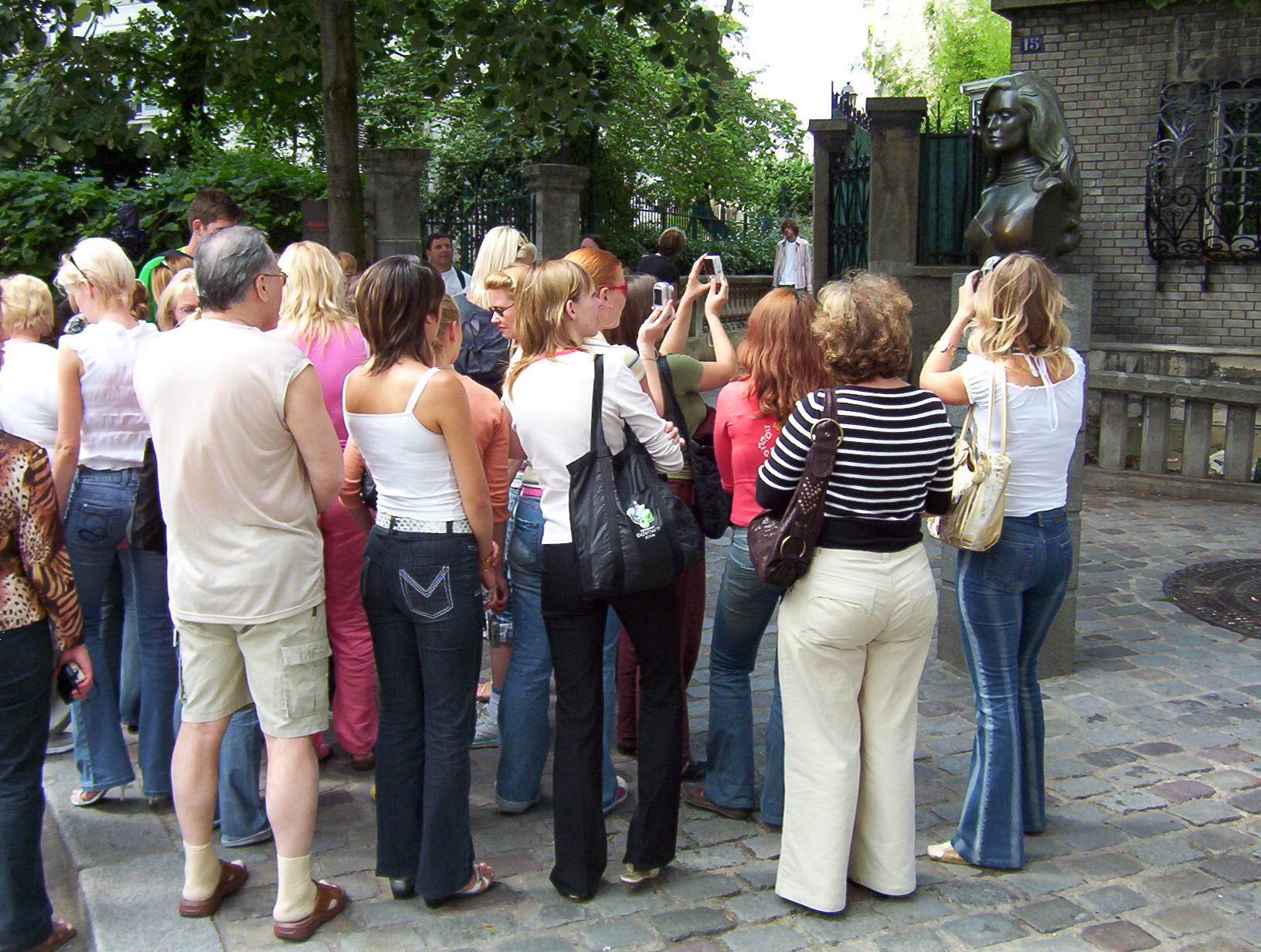
A group of tourists taking photographs of the bust

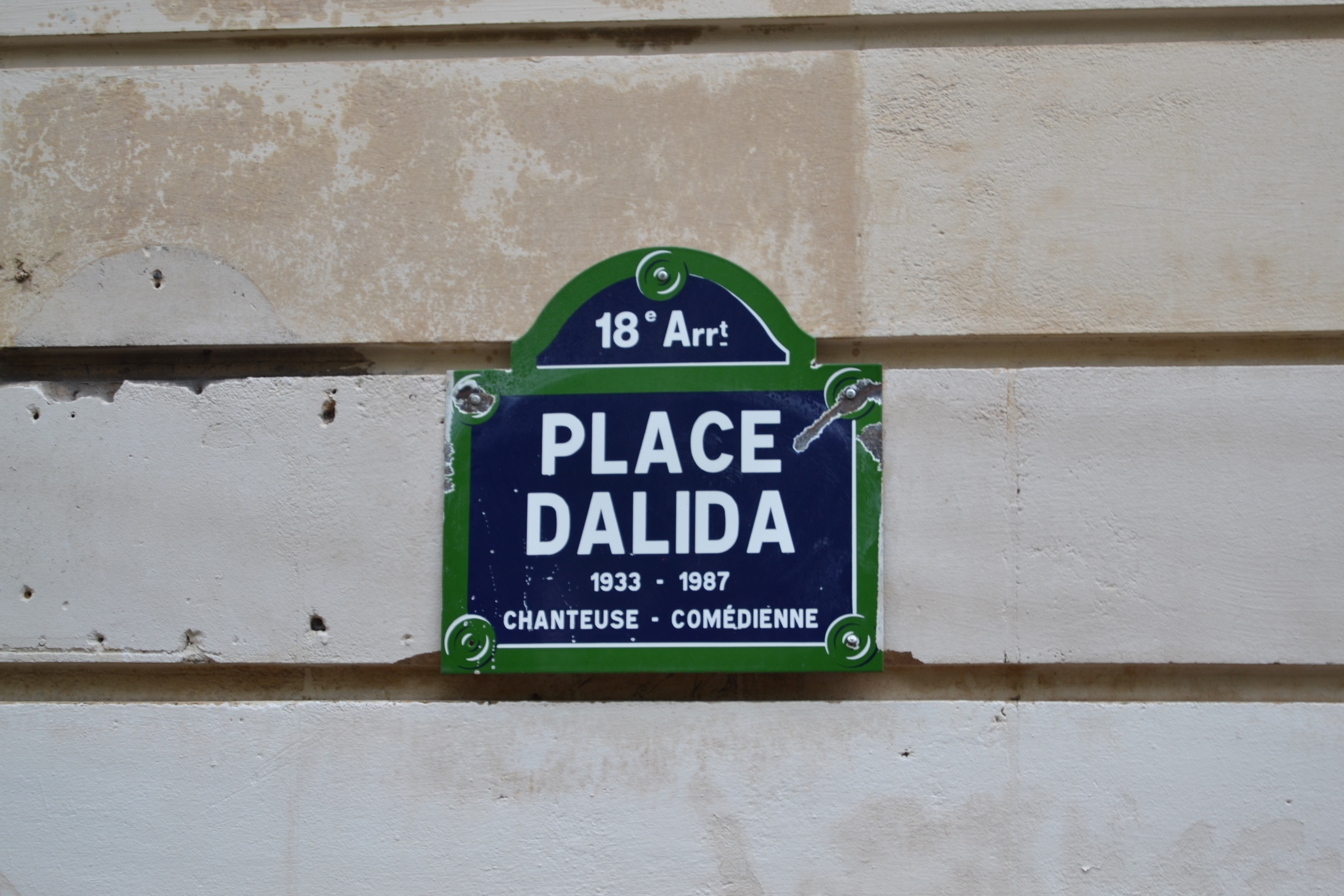
The plaque indicating the name of the square

The square is on the large corner of two picturesque Montmartre streets, the Rue Girardon and the Rue de l'Abreuvoir. The Rue Girardon spreads from south to the north and it connects with the Rue de l'Abreuvoir. From that point, the Rue de l'Abreuvoir spreads in a west–east direction, a configuration that makes an L-shaped street.

The square is approximately 19 m × 13 m (21 yd × 14 yd) and is completely surrounded by houses.

Three trees surround the bronze bust which is atop five blocks of cut granite. The bust was sculpted by the French artist Aslan. On the highest stone block on the statue, one underneath the bust, there is an engraved plaque saying; "YOLANDA GIGLIOTTI, dite DALIDA, chanteuse comédienne, 1933–1987" (English: "YOLANDA GIGLIOTTI, known as DALIDA, singer actress, 1933–1987").

== In popular culture ==
- Specifically location Dalida 75018 Paris, France makes an appearance in the Activision first-person shooter video game title Call of Duty: Modern Warfare 3 as the multiplayer map 'Resistance', pitting the French GIGN against the invading Russian Forces. The entire map is completely modeled after this location.
- A short scene of the 2013 French movie It Boy was filmed on the square.
- The square was the set for a few scenes of the 2013 movie 3 Days to Kill.
- The square is featured in the fifth episode of the 2020 Netflix comedy-drama series Emily in Paris.
- The bust is visited by London high school French students on a school trip to Paris in the 2022 Netflix series Heartstopper. A young lesbian couple take selfies at it.
