= A Glass and a Cigarette =

Sigara wa kass
- Directed by: Niazi Mostafa
- Starring: Samia Gamal
- Cinematography: Abdel Aziz Fahmy
- Release date: 11 September 1955
- Running time: 112 minutes
- Country: Egypt
- Language: Egyptian Arabic

A Glass and a Cigarette (Egyptian Arabic: سيجارة وكاس, romanized: Sigāra we-Kās) is a 1955 Egyptian melodrama directed by Niazi Mostafa. It stars Samia Gamal and it is also the first film to feature Dalida (then known as Dalila) in a supporting role.

== Plot ==
Hoda (Gamal) is a well-known entertainer in her thirties. She marries Mamdouh Samy (Nabil Al Alfi), a young surgeon, and leaves her glamorous lifestyle behind. Hoda supports Mamdouh in founding a hospital, but their marriage is threatened by the Italian head nurse, Iolanda (Dalida), who is drawn to Mamdouh. Suspecting an affair between her husband and Iolanda, Hoda turns to drinking and smoking for comfort.

== Cast ==
- Samia Gamal: Hoda Gamal
- Nabil Al Alfi: Mamdouh Samy
- Dalida: Iolanda
- Seraj Munir: Omara
- Kouka: Azza
