= Dalida =

Italian-French singer and actress (1933–1987)

Dalida OAL
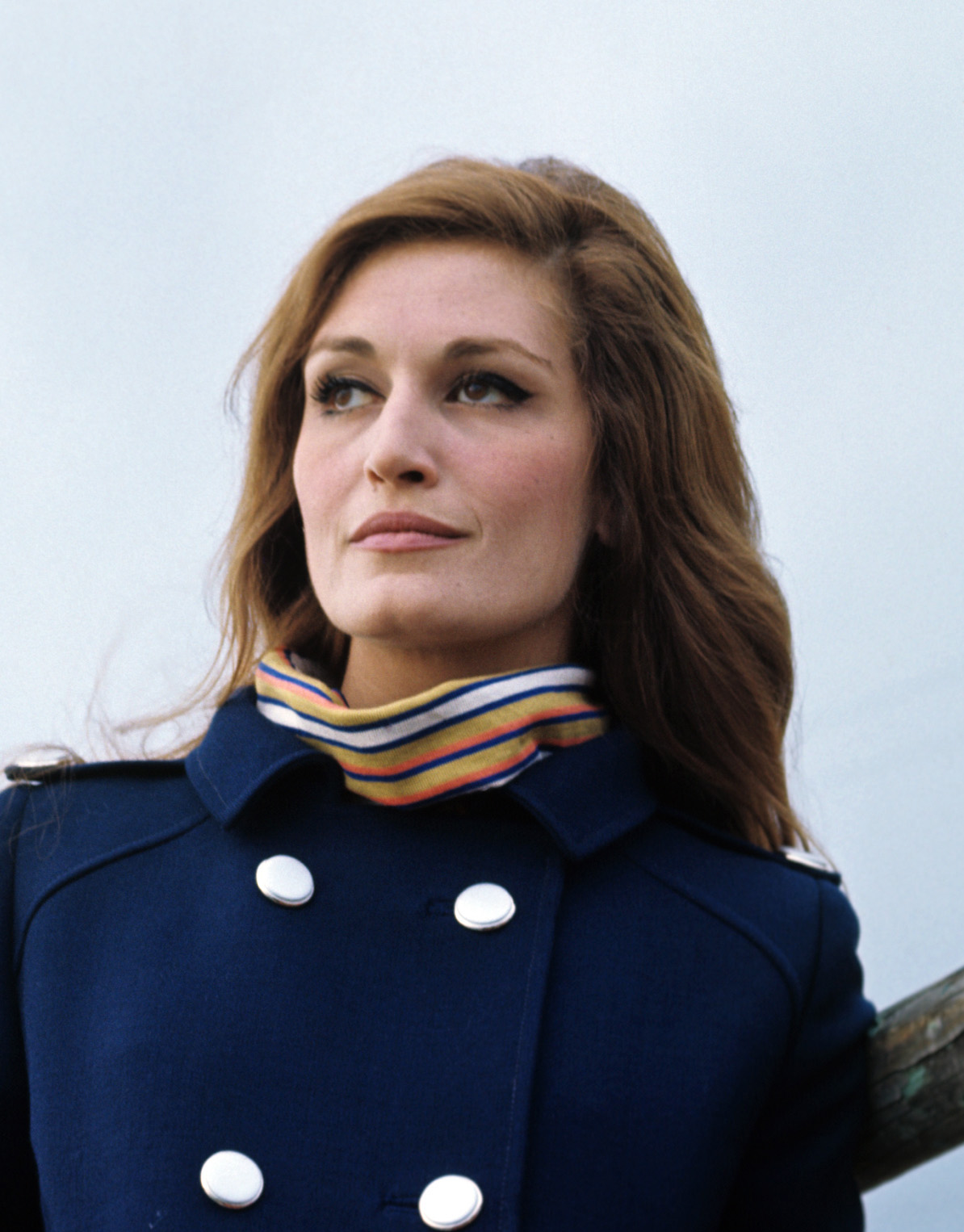
- Dalida in 1967
- Born: Iolanda Cristina Gigliotti; 17 January 1933; Cairo, Kingdom of Egypt
- Died: 3 May 1987 (aged 54); Paris, France
- Burial place: Montmartre Cemetery, Paris
- Monuments: Dalida tomb, Montmartre, Paris; Bust at Place Dalida, Montmartre, Paris
- Other names: Dalila; Yolanda Gigliotti; Dali
- Citizenship: France; Italy (Note: Born and raised in Egypt, Dalida never acquired Egyptian citizenship in accordance with jus sanguinis laws.)
- Occupations: Singer; actress; model
- Spouse: Lucien Morisse (m. 1961; div. 1962)
- Partners: Luigi Tenco (1966–1967); Richard Chanfray (1972–1981)
- Musical career
- Genres: Pop; disco; world music
- Instrument: Vocals
- Works: Dalida discography; List of songs recorded by Dalida
- Years active: 1954–1987
- Labels: Barclay; Orlando
- Website: dalida.com

Signature
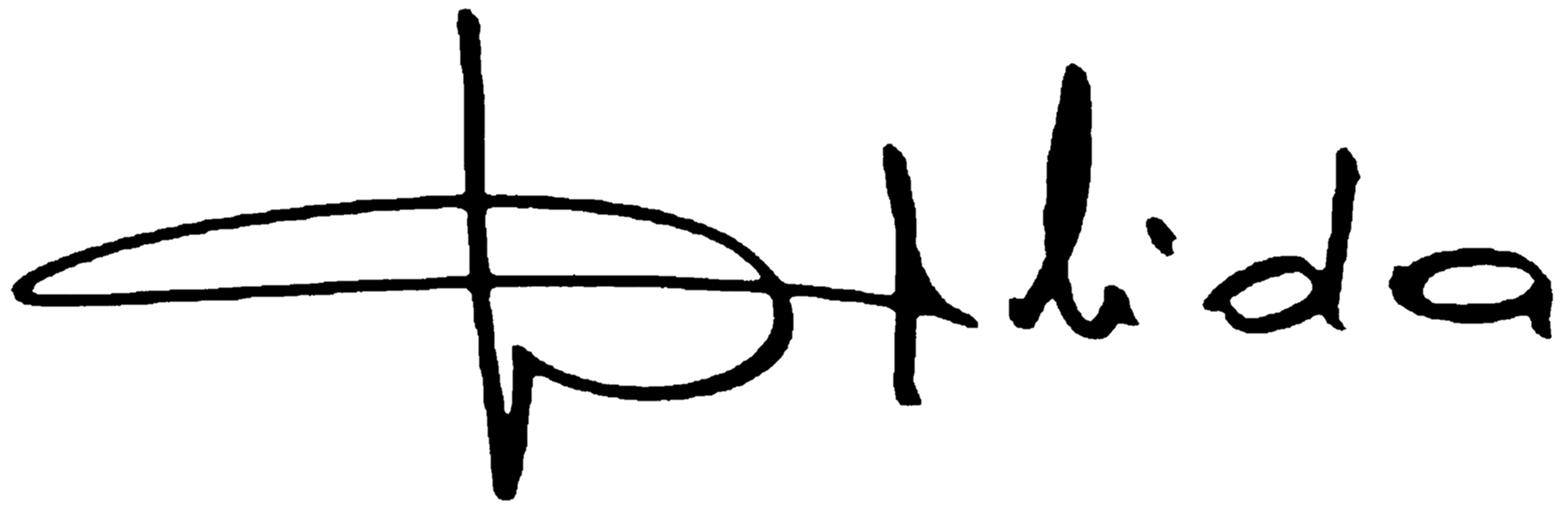

Iolanda Cristina Gigliotti (Italian: [joˈlanda kriˈstiːna dʒiʎˈʎɔtti]; 17 January 1933 – 3 May 1987), professionally known as Dalida (French: [dalida], Italian: [daliˈda]; Arabic: داليدا), was an Italian naturalized French singer and actress. Throughout her international career, Dalida sold more than 140 million records worldwide. Some of her best known songs include "Bambino", "Ciao amore, ciao", "Gigi l'amoroso", "Il venait d'avoir 18 ans", "Laissez-moi danser", "Salma ya salama", "Helwa ya baladi", "Mourir sur scène", and "Paroles, paroles" featuring spoken word by film star Alain Delon.

Initially an actress, she made her debut in the film A Glass and a Cigarette by Niazi Mustapha in 1955. A year later, having signed with the Barclay record company, Dalida achieved her first success as a singer with "Bambino". Following this, she became the top-selling recording artist in France between 1957 and 1961. Her music charted in many countries in Europe and Latin America. She collaborated with singers such as Julio Iglesias, Charles Aznavour, Johnny Mathis and Petula Clark.

Although she made a few films during her career as a singer, she effectively reconnected with cinema with The Sixth Day, a film by Youssef Chahine released in 1986. In France, although the film was hailed by critics, it was a commercial failure.

Dalida was deeply disturbed by the suicide of her partner Luigi Tenco in 1967. Despite this, she forged ahead with her career, forming the record label International Show with her brother Orlando, recording more music and performing at concerts and music competitions. After struggling with bouts of depression for many years, Dalida died by suicide from a drug overdose in 1987.

== Early years ==
=== Childhood in Cairo ===
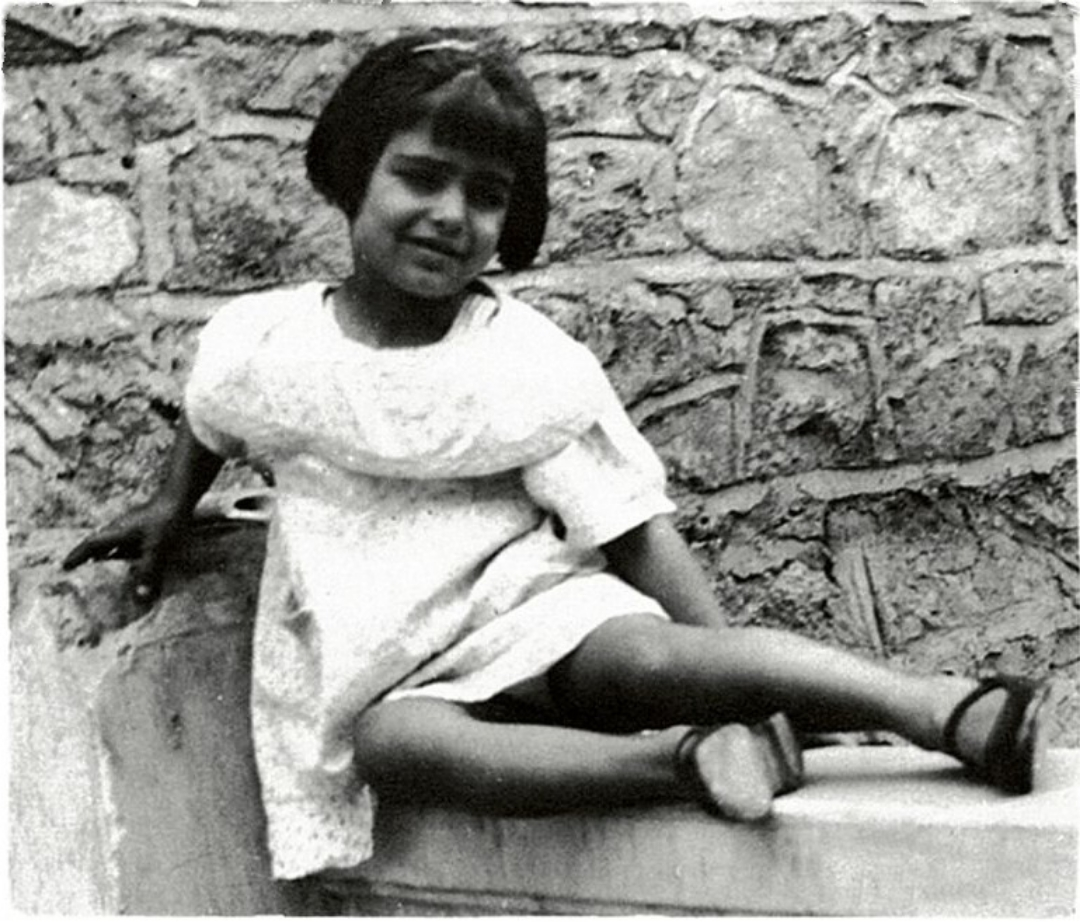
Dalida in 1937, aged 4

Dalida was born Iolanda Cristina Gigliotti at the Italian Hospital in Cairo, Egypt, on 17 January 1933. Her father Pietro Gigliotti (1904–1945) and mother Filomena Giuseppina (née d'Alba; 1904–1971) were both born in Serrastretta, in the Italian region of Calabria, and were then taken by their emigrant parents to Egypt. Pietro studied music at school and played the violin in taverns; Giuseppina was a seamstress and homemaker. By birth, Dalida automatically gained Italian nationality through jus sanguinis of both Italian parents. It has been suggested that Dalida had Jewish roots, with her family's hometown of Serrastretta having been founded by Spanish Jews and her grandfather Enrico having Algerian Jewish ancestry.

The year they were married, the Gigliottis settled in the Shubra district of Cairo, where, between the births of Iolanda's older brother Orlando (1930–1992) and younger brother Bruno (1936–), the Gigliotti family became well established in the community. In addition to earnings from Giuseppina's work, their social status benefited when Pietro became primo violino at Cairo's Khedivial Opera House, and the family bought a two-storey house.

At 10 months old, Gigliotti caught an eye infection and had to wear bandages for 40 days. Her father would play lullabies on the violin to soothe her. She underwent eye operations between the ages of three and five. Having to wear glasses throughout elementary school, for which she was bullied, she later recalled: "I was [sic] enough of it, I would rather see the world in a blur than wear glasses, so I threw them through the window." Gigliotti attended the Scuola Tecnica Commerciale Maria Ausiliatrice, an Italian Catholic school located in northern Shubra.

In 1940, Allied forces took her father and other Italian men from their quarter to the Fayed prison camp in the desert near Cairo. When Pietro was released in 1944, he returned home a completely different person, so violent that Gigliotti and other children in the neighbourhood were scared of him. She later recalled, "I hated him when he beat me, I hated him especially when he beat my mom and brothers. I wanted him to die, and he did." Gigliotti was twelve when Pietro died of a brain abscess in 1945.

=== Modelling, acting ===
In her teen years, Gigliotti developed an interest in acting due to her uncle's job as a projectionist for a local cinema, and often participated in school performances at the end of the semester. She graduated in 1951, and began working as a copy typist in a pharmaceutical company the same year. While required to work to financially help her family, Gigliotti still had acting ambitions.

Shortly thereafter, her best friend Miranda encouraged her to compete in Miss Ondine, a minor Cairo beauty pageant which she entered on the assurance that it was just for fun and that her mother would not find out. When Gigliotti unexpectedly won second prize and Miranda won second runner-up, they were photographed and the photographs were published in newspapers Le journal d'Égypte and Le progrès égyptien. The next day, when her mother found out, she forcibly cut Gigliotti's hair short. Eventually, her mother relented and Gigliotti left her job to start modelling for Donna, a Cairo-based fashion house.

Three Egyptian film directors cast Gigliotti in their productions: Marco de Gastyne cast her in The Mask of Tutankhamun (1954) and Niazi Mostafa cast her in a supporting role in A Glass and a Cigarette (1954), on posters for which she appears with her newly adopted stage name Dalila (which she would soon change to "Dalida") because, as she explained in 1968, "it was a very frequent name in Egypt and I liked it a lot."

=== Relocation to Paris and decisive 421 dice game ===
On 25 December 1954, Dalida left Egypt for Paris. Her first residence was a room in an apartment belonging to Gastyne's friend, the impresario Vidal. She met with a number of directors and auditioned for movie roles, but failed each time. Vidal relocated her to a smaller apartment, where her first neighbour was the actor Alain Delon (who at this time was still unknown to the wider public), with whom she had a brief relationship.

Dalida's difficulty in finding acting work throughout 1955 led her to try singing. Vidal introduced her to Roland Berger, a friend and professor who agreed to give her singing lessons seven days per week for a low fee. He was strict and used to yell, with Dalida responding even more loudly. Their lessons sometimes ended with her slamming the door, but she always returned the next day. Seeing her progress, Berger arranged for her to perform in the cabaret Le Drap d'Or on Champs-Élysées, where she was spotted by Jacques Paoli, the director of another cabaret, La Villa d'Este. Paoli engaged her for a series of performances that proved to be popular, and Dalida received her first attention from the public in France, among whom was Bruno Coquatrix, the director of Olympia, who invited her to perform in his singing contest Les Numéros 1 de demain. Coquatrix later said: "[H]er voice is full of colour and volume, and has all that men love: gentleness, sensuality and eroticism." Dalida was also spotted by author and screenwriter Alfred Marchand, who advised to change her name to Dalida, since her pseudonym too closely resembled the Biblical character as depicted in the movie Samson and Delilah. She immediately followed the advice.

On 9 April 1956, Dalida participated in the singing contest Les Numéros 1 de demain, performing "Etrangère au Paradis". Prior to the competition, Eddie Barclay, the owner of the largest record label in France, Barclay, and Lucien Morisse, the artistic director of the newly established radio station Europe n°1, met in Bar Romain (now Petit Olympia) and discussed what to do that evening. Barclay wanted to watch a film, whereas Morisse wanted to attend the singing competition, which was being held at Olympia Hall, then the largest venue in Paris. They settled their disagreement by playing 421, a dice game, which Morisse won. Together with their friend Coquatrix, they were greatly impressed after Dalida won the contest, and arranged a meeting with her. This event was later revisited in biopics and books, and became regarded as fateful for Dalida's career. The three men went on to play a large part in launching her career.

== Career ==
=== Les années Barclay – The Barclay years ===
==== First contract and overnight success with "Bambino" ====
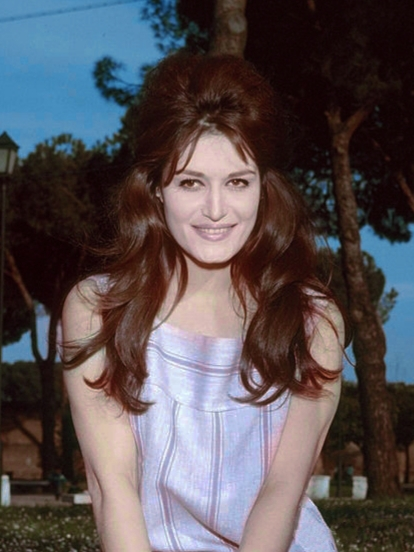
Dalida in the 1950s

After the performance in Les Numéros 1 de demain, Morisse handed Dalida his card so that they could meet in his office as soon as possible, which she accepted without hesitation. A few days later, on the second floor of the building at 26 Rue François Ier, she performed "Barco negro", a recent hit by Amália Rodrigues, humming the a cappella verses and tapping her fingertips on a corner of Morisse's desk. Visibly satisfied, he demanded that she work on minor imperfections before a new audition in front of Eddie Barclay in person. On 2 May 1956 in Barclay's office at 20 Rue de Madrid, Dalida signed a renewable one-year contract, with a modest percentage on record sales, with the promise of increasing it if the expected success was accomplished. While Morisse was responsible for radio promotion, Coquatrix had developed a strategy to grab the headlines. He planned to promote her through a series of concerts, including two concerts at the Olympia, two weeks in Bobino, and a tour of the provinces.

Her first song "Madona" was recorded in June and was first released in August on an EP with three other songs. "Madona" was played on 28 August 1956 on Radio Europe n°1, which was Dalida's first radio appearance. The record achieved sufficient success and was followed by a second EP, Le Torrent, a month later, which received an equally encouraging welcome. Dalida continued performing live throughout the latter part of 1956, while her promoters worked on developing a song that would make her a star; Morisse asked lyricist Jacques Larue to write a French language version of the Neapolitan song "Guaglione", which had won at the recent inaugural Festival di Napoli and would become "Bambino".

"Bambino" was released in early December only as a promo single, but quickly received more public interest than all of her previous recordings. Morisse started to heavily promote it and it was placed as the first track on Dalida's debut album Son nom est Dalida, which was issued at the end of the same month. The album was immediately followed by a third EP titled Bambino. After debuting at number seven in January 1957, Bambino reached number one and went on to become the biggest-selling and one of the most beloved pop standard hits of the 1950s in France, Belgium, Canada and Switzerland. As the song knocked Doris Day's "Whatever Will Be, Will Be" off the top of the French charts, women began to emulate Dalida's makeup, resulting in an explosion of Rimmel sales, while men saw in her a talent, sensuality and sexiness. Coquatrix then named her "the first sex-symbol of the song". "Bambino" was Dalida's first number-one hit, and through 1957 it became the longest-running number one in world history, with a total of 39 consecutive weeks, a record that it still holds. It made Dalida an overnight star and gave her her first gold disc, the very first time that such an award had been received by a woman, on 19 September 1957 for sales of over 300,000. As the French music industry was then still in the background, "Bambino" was described in 2007 by Bertrand Dicale of Le Figaro as "a launch that announced what will happen in the coming decades ... a start of really modern times where singer is more important than song". Promoting it in early 1957, Dalida also made her first TV appearance, and her contract was immediately extended for four years. Then she also received her first criticism from a journalist: "On stage, Dalida appears in beauty and warmth, highlighted by a presentation of extreme sobriety."

==== First Olympia concert, new success with "Gondolier", tourings and return to film ====
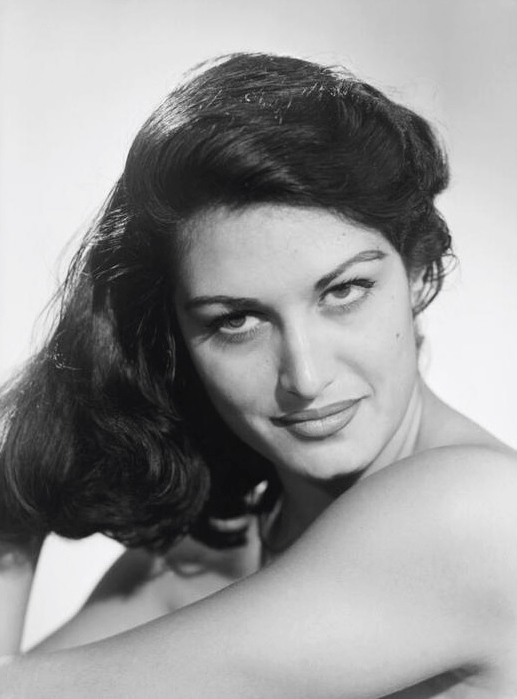
Dalida in 1957

On the night of 27 February 1957, Dalida held her first concert at the Olympia, as the opening act for Charles Aznavour, and was widely applauded. Then, in April, she performed a successful two-week series of concerts at Bobino, and in the summer a fan club was established, the first such club to be devoted to a female artist. As well as live performances, the prolonged success of "Bambino" through 1957 was followed with new recordings such as "Miguel" and "Tu n'as pas très bon caractère", which eventually replaced "Bambino" as number one in France in October. Dalida came back to the Olympia in September as the opening act for Gilbert Bécaud; the newly renovated Olympia having just acquired its red neon facade sign. A future iconic symbol of the hall, Bécaud and Dalida became the first two names to appear on it. After her second success there, Dalida released her second album Miguel and returned to the studio in mid-October to record what was to become one of her old standards, "Histoire d'un amour". Staying in the top ten for eight months, it earned Dalida a second gold disc.

Dalida's experimentation with exotica resulted in "Gondolier", released for Christmas 1957. For this exotic song with accentuated vocals, Dalida delivered a TV appearance where, while sailing an imaginary gondola, the shoulder strap of her dress fell down. The reappearance of this video in the 1970s made the moment notable, and the public started to consider it iconic that Dalida dared to do such a thing on television during such a conventional time in society. Nevertheless, "Gondolier" debuted at number one in both the French and Canadian charts, where it spent four months, remaining in the top twenty for almost a year and becoming her biggest hit since "Bambino". Its B side "Pardon" also proved popular, reaching number one in Canada. Dalida then also started to perform more frequently in France, Belgium and Luxembourg.

By the end of April 1958, a radio programmer heard Dalida recording "Dans le bleu du ciel bleu" in Barclay's Hoche studios in Paris. After immediately asking for a copy of the tape and broadcasting it, the radio station was swamped with phone calls from people asking for the number of the disc and when it would be available. As the song replaced "Gondolier" as number one in France, Dalida scored a still-current chart record in France of five songs simultaneously in the top ten. It was followed by her receipt of RMC's singer of the year award, which she went on to win for six consecutive years. In June she embarked upon her first "TDF avec Dalida 58" tour (Tour de France with Dalida), with a daily appearance in the city hosting each stage of the 1958 Tour de France, which she repeated several time in future decades. She also performed in Algiers during the summer, supporting the morale of French soldiers fighting the Algerian War, and held a new series of galas in France and Belgium that regularly ended with two hours of autograph signing. During this summer Dalida released her third album Gondolier, and also recorded several new songs such as "Je pars", "Aïe mon cœur" and "Les Gitans"; all of which were sales successes, each earning Dalida a gold disc. With "Je pars", Dalida started French rock 'n' roll and also paved the way for foreign rock artists to enter the market, such as Paul Anka.

In late 1958, Dalida returned to film in her first on-screen role in four years, playing the supporting role of a singer-spy in the mystery film Rapt au deuxième bureau. A few months later, she appeared alongside Eddie Barclay in Brigade des mœurs, both starring as themselves. These two B movies were also used for promotion of her three songs "Inconnue mon amour", "L'amour chante", and "Aime-moi", and were released in September 1958 and March 1959, respectively.

On 9 October, she again performed at Bobino, this time for three weeks as the headline performer, where she promoted her latest releases "Du moment qu'on s'aime", which peaked in the charts the same week, and "Come prima". Topping the charts in January 1959, where it remained over most of the winter, "Come prima" proved to be an ultimate holiday hit in France and Belgium, as Dalida could be seen promoting it on a Christmas-themed television set. The record's B side "Si je pouvais revivre un jour ma vie" also achieved success, topping the Canadian charts. According to her biographer Catherine Rihoit, her live television appearances "got her into the palms of society, keeping her position as a favorite singer of all age groups in the francophonie", and marked an era of late 1950s television shows. On 26 December 1958 Dalida was in New York with Morisse where they met Norman Granz, the American impresario of Ella Fitzgerald, who invited her to Hollywood and offered a fifteen-year contract to launch her career in the United States. She quickly rejected the offer, saying that she wanted to focus on her musical career in France where she was already well known with a secure fan base.

==== "Am Tag als der Regen kam" and international recognition; best selling singer in Europe ====
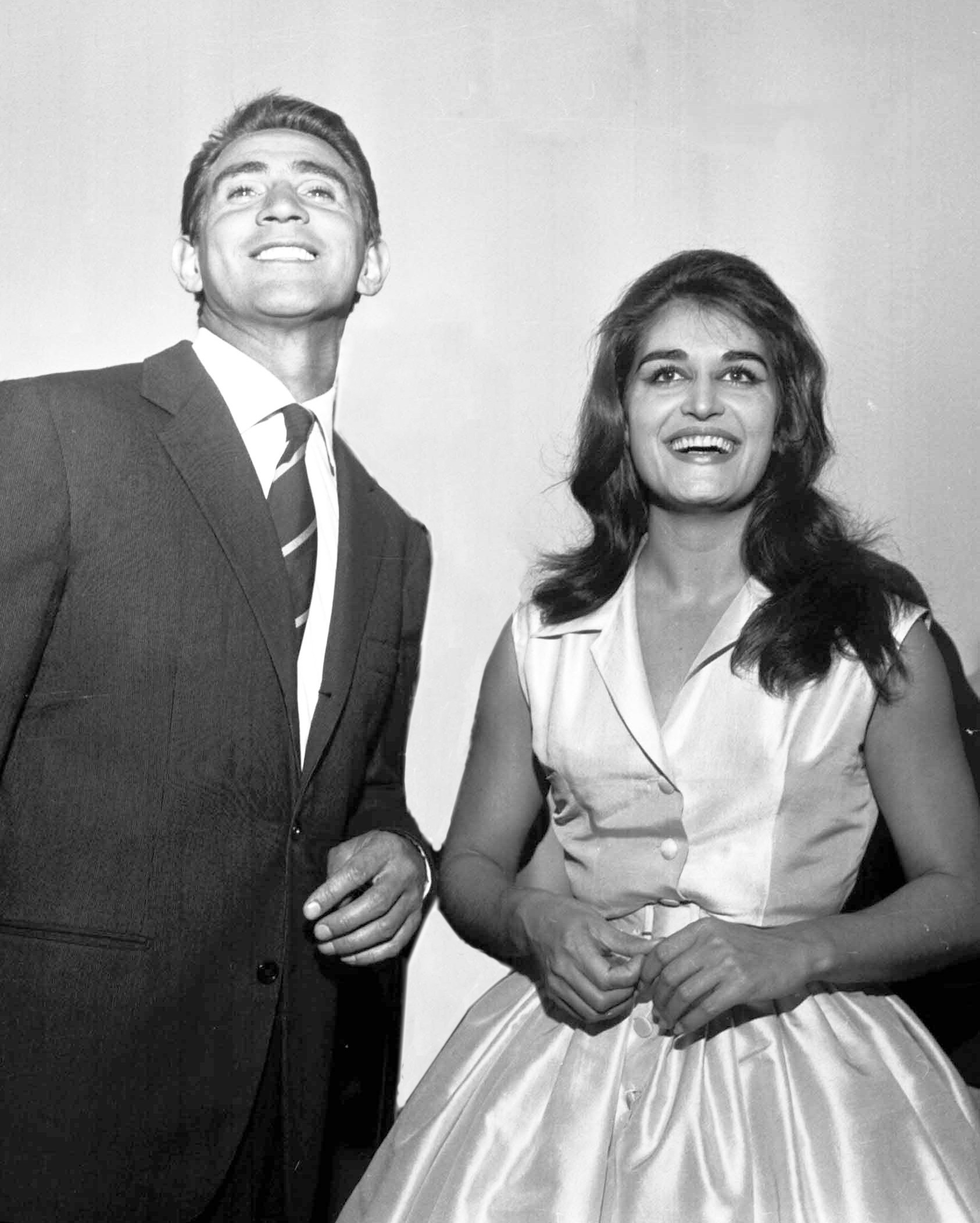
Dalida with Walter Chiari in 1959

Dalida toured extensively in 1959, playing sold-out dates in France, Egypt, Italy and Germany. As her fame spread outside France, she started to record songs in other languages to cater for these new audiences. She understood five languages and interpreted her songs in eleven languages: German, Egyptian Arabic, English, Lebanese Arabic, Spanish, French, Greek, Hebrew, Italian, Japanese and Dutch. In February, during a TV appearance, she performed her recent version of "Hava Nagila". On 2 March, the Minister of informations awarded her, alongside Yves Montand, with the Bravos du music hall, the most prestigious music award in France, as the most popular singer in France. During the summer, she covered her own recordings "Ne joue pas" and "C'est ça l'amore" in Flemish as "Speel niet met m'n hart" and "Ik zing amore", respectively, the only time in her career that she sang in Flemish.

In late summer, Dalida was back in the studio to record her first major international hit. In the period from 1958 to 1959, "Le Jour où la pluie viendra" was recorded in three languages, propelling Dalida straight into the top three in six different European countries. The German-language version "Am Tag als der Regen kam" topped the German charts for ten weeks in September and October, earning her another gold disc. It was the best-selling record of the year in Germany, and remains one of the most successful songs in the history of the country. During the closing night of the Berlin Film Festival on 28 September 1959, she was presented with a Golden Lion award by RTL as the best-selling musical artist of the year in Germany, and was saluted with a fanfare playing the verses of "Am Tag als der Regen kam". The song was her first international hit, reaching half a million accumulated copies and remaining one of her greatest successes in Germany.

During the course of 1959, Dalida scored five Top 10 hits in French charts, most notably "Ciao, ciao Bambina" and "Guitare et Tambourin"; both of which earned gold discs. In Italy, RAI awarded her with Oscar di popolarità and Golden Wolf awards as the best-selling musical artist of the year in the country. These were her first two foreign awards and furthered her international recognition. Dalida also performed in successful sold-out concerts in Berlin, Athens and Cairo, delivering a sentimental performance in front of a crowd in the Rivoli cinema that she frequented as a child. On 23 September 1959, Dalida sang in a successful three-week run at Parisian Théâtre de l'Étoile, where a jukebox was installed in recognition of her being dubbed "Mademoiselle Jukebox", the most listened-to artist on jukeboxes in France. By the end of the year, she had released her fifth and sixth albums, Le Disque d'or de Dalida and Love in Portofino (titled after her hit song "Love in Portofino"), and had already sold three and a half million records, the highest sales of all European artists.

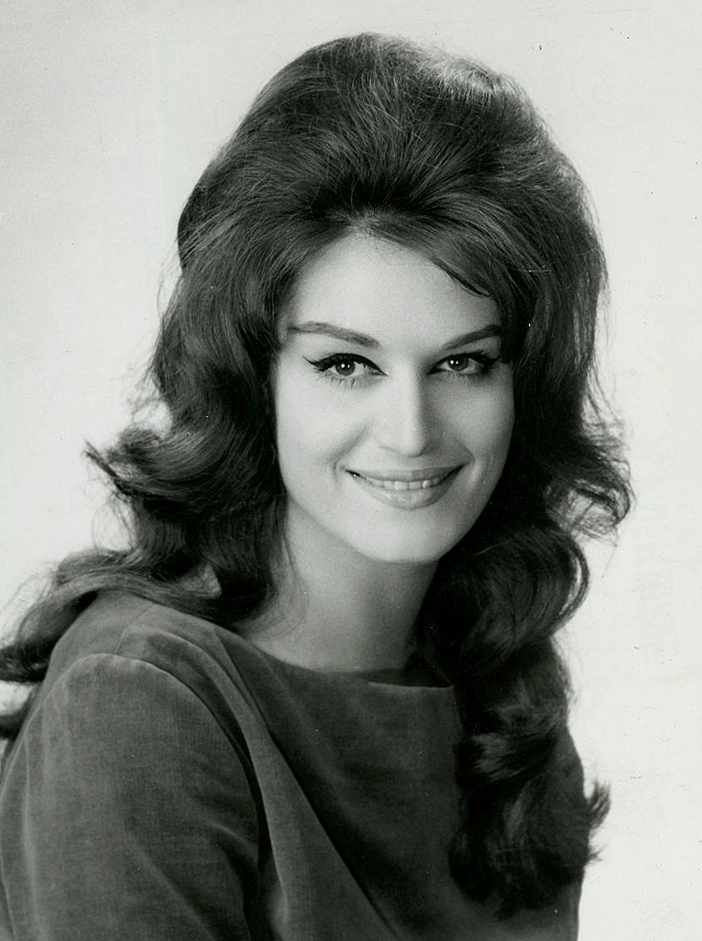
Dalida in 1961

==== "Les Enfants du Pirée" and "Itsi bitsi petit bikini"; transition to yé-yé and first Olympia concert residency ====
Dalida began 1960 with "T'aimer follement", which became a chart-topper in France and Belgium in February. She then embarked upon her first world tour and reached the summit of the charts again with "Romantica" in April. Her third release of the year "Les Enfants du Pirée" brought Dalida huge commercial success, becoming her second biggest international hit after "Am Tag als der Regen kam". It reached the top two in six European countries and in Canada, topping the charts in three of them. After its debut at the top of the French charts in June 1960, where it remained for 20 weeks, it became the first song by a French singer to sell over one million copies internationally, and the expression tube de l'été ("hit of the summer") was invented after its success. Dalida eventually recorded it in five different languages and made a video to be shown on TV, Toute la Chanson. With a harbor theme, it showed Dalida singing and lying on a fishing net with a wind machine blowing, and journalist Jacques Chancel called it "the first video in France that really made a shift from the era of outdated videos".

The success was followed by her second Italian award Oscar di popolarità and a Golden Wolf as the best-selling musical artist of the year. Back in France, Dalida was not pleased by the emergence of the new musical style yé-yé, as the new singers would only briefly occupy the charts and then disappear. Also, since the appearance of new radio programs for youth such as Salut les copains, both music-hall songs and singers, such as Dalida, began to be regarded as obsolete. Dalida realized that she would have to make a drastic change to retain her image, and in September she covered the US hit "Itsi bitsi petit bikini". Now one of her signature songs, it became the first big yé-yé hit in France and became the second song to receive the title tube de l'été, displacing "Les Enfants du Pirée" from the top of the charts. Securing her position as a leading singer in France, "Itsi bitsi petit bikini" introduced Dalida to a whole new generation of young fans. Topping the charts across Western Europe and in Canada, the record was also her second to sell over a million and gained her a thirteenth golden disc.

This success was followed by "Milord", a number one in Austria, Germany and Italy, after which her first album issued solely for the Italian public was named. Dalida then completed a year-long world tour, performing in countries across Europe, in Canada and in several Arab states. In December, she issued an EP Joyeux Noël collecting four of the best-known holiday carols in French, and her New Year's show Réveillon de Paris broke the record for a TV audience, with nearly six million viewers.

In January 1961, Dalida covered The Drifters' "Save the last dance for me" as "Garde-moi la dernière danse", reaching the top two. It remained her biggest French hit of the year as she undertook another year-long world tour, which started in Tehran on 18 February in front of the Iranian royal family in their Sa'dabad Palace. With a total of almost 200 dates, the last leg of the tour included Dalida's first own concert residency at the Olympia, which started on 6 December. Due to her recent love affair, her divorce from Morisse and her new yé-yé direction, several critics announced this to be "attestment of an end and downfall of Dalida". Dalida "brought the house down" according to Beuve-Méry of Le Monde; the month-long show was a sell-out success, with the first night being broadcast live by Radio Europe N°1. Among other musicians who attended, she was congratulated by Édith Piaf, who told her: "You are a winner, like me. After me, it will be you." Dalida also set the record for the largest public attendance and the longest-running concert residency at the Olympia, with a total of 52,000 spectators over the course of 30 days, a record that she would break herself in 1981. At the end of the year, on 30 December, Dalida completed her world tour at the Ancienne Belgique in Bruxelles, Olympia's Belgian equivalent.

During 1961, Dalida issued a set of new Italian songs on the Canta in italiano EP, and also scored several top ten hits internationally such as "Nuits d'Espagne" and "Tu ne sais pas". In April "Pépé" became a number one hit both in Austria and Germany, while "24 mille baisers" charted separately in Austria and France. She also issued two albums Dalida internationale and Loin de moi. During the spring in Italy, Dalida signed with film director Giorgio Simonelli and revived her film career with the first film in which she plays the main role. Originally titled Che femmina... e che dollari!, it was revoiced and retitled for a French audience as Parlez-moi d'amour, after one of the soundtrack songs. The movie also features several other recordings by Dalida, including the posthumously released "Ho trovato la felicità". In contrast to her other previous movies, Che femmina... e che dollari! was not a commercial failure, with the moderate gross income eventually surpassing the low budget. Rihoit wrote: "sealing her appearance of the early 60's, since it is also her first color film, all the power and acting potential that Dalida carries in herself and transmits to the screen is clearly visible".

==== "La Leçon de Twist", "Le Petit Gonzales", exhaustive tours and scopitones ====
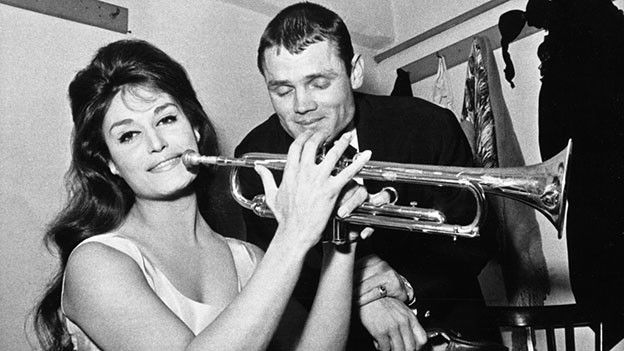
Dalida with Chet Baker on 13 April 1961, Italy

After a short break Dalida was back on tour, this time starting in Canada where "Tu peux le prendre" had reached number one. On 5 February, on the popular French youth TV program Toute la Chanson, Dalida performed her latest yé-yé release "La Leçon de Twist". Accompanied on the piano by then leading French teen idol Johnny Hallyday, he also taught Dalida the dance moves, about what she said: "he really showed himself, the most friendly of teachers of this new rhythm". The performance caused a sensation, rocketing her track straight to the top of French and Belgian charts. "La Leçon de Twist" was followed by another success in the same genre "Achète-moi un juke-box", with the lyrics "Oh dad, buy me a jukebox, to listen to Elvis Presley, Les Chaussettes Noires, and Johnny Hallyday – And Dalida? But what is she doing here, they still listen to her?", Dalida was making a joke at her own expense referring to the current situation in France where the young people were fond of young singers, despite her success during the yé-yé era. The record spent two weeks at number one during the spring.

From April to July Dalida toured Italy and Vietnam. In Saigon, her popularity led to traffic congestion when she performed, but the local authorities interrupted her show during a rendition of "La Leçon de Twist" because the song was considered to be a political act. In May Dalida was back at the top of the international charts with "Le Petit Gonzales", a cover of "Speedy Gonzales", which peaked in France, Belgium, Canada and Spain the following month and remains known as "one of the most memorable and nostalgic recordings of the yé-yé era", according to Le Parisien in 1987. The album of the same name was issued later in the year.

Although Dalida had filmed her first scopitone in 1961 for the song "Loin de moi", starting a series of music videos that were followed by almost all yé-yé newcomers, her best critically and commercially received scopitone was recorded in September 1962 for the song "Le Jour le plus long", in which she paid tribute to the Allies' disembarkation in Normandy on 6 June 1944. Under the direction of the young Claude Lelouch, who later became one of the most acclaimed French directors, Dalida dressed as a soldier and walked through a war-torn forest in the middle of bombing accompanied by real scenes from the Second World War. This unusual image of Dalida found an audience and was a hit in cafes. Alongside Dalida's performance of the song on 26 September, in front of a crowd of 2,000 people on the first floor of the Eiffel Tower, "Le Jour le plus long" topped charts in France for two weeks and earned her another gold disc.

==== More concentration on concerts, shift to pop; "Eux", "Amore scusami" and first platinum disc ====
Dalida spent 1963 making live appearance all over the world and dedicating herself more to the young Canadian public, as yé-yé was experiencing its greatest success in France during this period. Her world tour was a success, with sold-out concerts in Europe from Portugal to Poland, Canada, Asia, Fort-de-France, Latin America and Arabian countries. In Algeria, she became the first artist to appear since the proclamation of independence. Dalida also dedicated the late summer period to filming, spending three months in Hong Kong filming in the B movie L'Inconnue de Hong-Kong in which she starred alongside Serge Gainsbourg. Although the movie was a commercial flop, Dalida received favorable reviews.

In January 1963 at Cortina d'Ampezzo, Dalida was awarded with the Oscar Mondiale del Successo dei Juke Box award for the most listened artist on jukeboxes in Europe. Later the same month, she made a shift from yé-yé in covering Ben E. King's "Stand by Me" as "Tu croiras", which was followed by an equally melancholic string of recordings such as "Le Jour du retour", a summer number one hit in Canada, and "Eux" which subsequently peaked at number two in Argentina and was recorded in five languages. "Eux" was awarded the Oscar mundial du success du disque for the most international sales by a French artist in 1963, and Dalida named her fourteenth studio album after it.

The 1963 world tour was extended into 1964 with only a few short breaks. The French leg of the tour started on 11 April 1964, during which Dalida traveled 30,000 kilometers solely by car over its five-month run, and had a public attendance in excess of 200,000. "The most iconic moment of the tour," according to her brother Orlando, was a concert at Draguignan on 14 August when "Dalida appeared with blond hair for the first time, and shocked the crowd that didn't recognize her at first glance." After the concert in Pont-sur-Yonne on 2 September, Dalida accepted the offer of local truck drivers to become their godmother of honor. The tour was followed by a concert residency in the Olympia two days later when Dalida and other celebrities, Charles Aznavour, Françoise Hardy, Johnny Hallyday and Sylvie Vartan, were conveyed to the entrance of the Olympia by the same drivers on open trucks, forming a parade through the streets of Paris. The event generated even more interest in the sold-out three-week residency, which had already received a huge amount of media coverage. During the television transmission of the crowd at the entrance, a teenage fan said: "We can hardly wait for her [Dalida] to appear, we've been screaming for an hour and the atmosphere is so crazy", upon which the reporter turned to the camera, saying "the whole of Paris came to see [the parade], only in front of the Olympia there are at least 2,000 people waiting in the street".

As Dalida was recording simultaneously with her concerts during the course of 1964, releases such as "Ce coin de terre", "Ne t'en fais pas pour ça" and "Chaque instant de" were poorly promoted on TV, eventually only entering the top twenty. "Là il a dit" had peaked at number six in Canada earlier in the year, but on finishing the tour in November, Dalida returned to the studio to record "Amore scusami", an orchestral sentimental pop ballad, which was a completely new genre in her repertoire. The song was rush-released and swiftly became a hit at the end of the year, earning Dalida another gold disc, the first in two years following "Le Jour le plus long". Following the success of "Amore scusami", an album of the same name was released on 17 September. Dalida was awarded with a platinum disc for surpassing sales of over 10 million records since her debut in 1956. Specifically created for her, this was the first time in the music industry that the term "platinum disc" had been used.

Refusing to perform at Sanremo Music Festival, Dalida instead released the EP Sanremo 65 that included her latest Italian top ten hit "Ascoltami". With new performances at Bobino and Tête de l'Art in the following months, Dalida was in the top ten in France and Belgium with a cover of Rita Pavone's "Viva la pappa col pomodoro" that gained huge interest among children. The B side "La Sainte Totoche", written and composed by Charles Aznavour, peaked at number six in Turkey and was applauded by Lettres françaises, who wrote "Sainte Totoche enters the calendar" as it "evokes the women neglected by their husbands". Back on world tour in 1965, Dalida held concerts in Fort-de-France where she was welcomed by more than 20,000 enthusiastic Martinicans. France-Antilles reported that "only the President of the Republic had an ovation of this scale, during his visit in March 1964". The next day, Dalida herself rewarded Juliana Brown, the winner of the Dalida Song Contest which had been established in her honour. In a poll conducted by IFOP on 24 April 1965 Dalida was voted the favourite French singer of the decade, ahead of Édith Piaf.

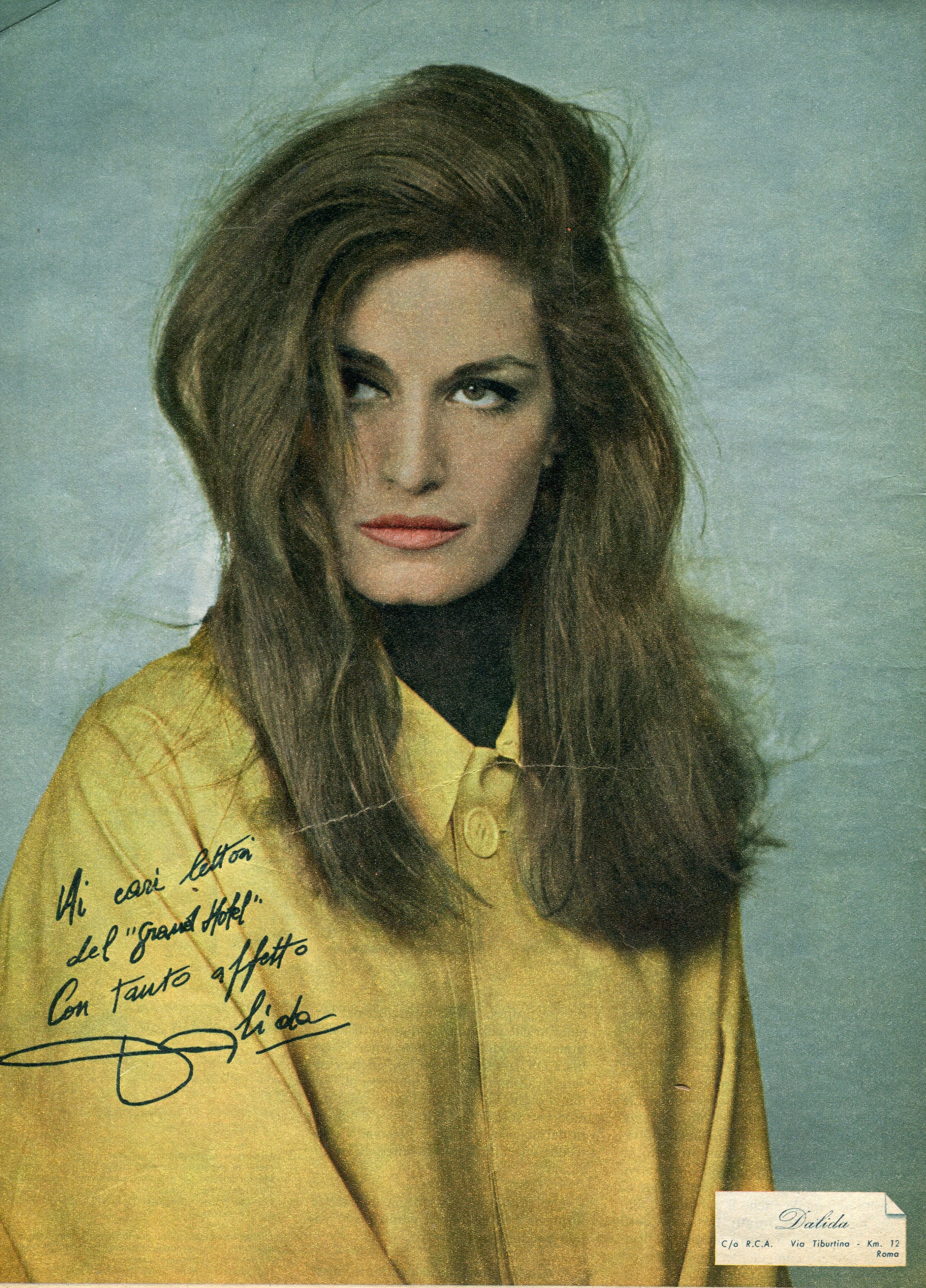
Publicity photo, 1960s

==== "La Danse de Zorba" and "Il silenzio" ====
In June 1965, Dalida recorded "La Danse de Zorba", a song from the 1964 movie Zorba the Greek, which became her biggest international success since "24 mille baisers" in early 1961. The song found Dalida in seven international charts, entering the top three in six and topping the chart in two countries. Surpassing a million copies, it also earned Dalida two more golden discs; in France, and in Brazil, where it was also awarded with the Cico Viola award for the best-selling record of the year. With Dalida making daily appearances on television dancing a sirtaki to the song in the summer of 1965, "La Danse de Zorba" became one of the year's tube de l'été, alongside Christophe's "Aline" and Hervé Villard's "Capri c'est fini".

During the summer, Dalida performed in Morocco and Algeria, played a supporting role in the Italian comedy movie Menage all'italiana alongside Ugo Tognazzi and, making her debut, Romina Power, and released one of her first records in single format, "Wenn die Soldaten".

In October, the song "Il silenzio" was released on her fourth EP of the year. It was also a chart-topping hit in Europe, Canada and Latin America, reaching number one in France and Italy, where it was the best-selling record of the year, beating "La Danse de Zorba" and receiving a gold certification. Accompanying it were "Le Flamenco" and "Scandale dans la famille", which were also well received in Belgium and Canada. The success of "Il silenzio" concluded the most successful year in Dalida's career to date and produced the album of the same name, which collected the year's releases.

1966 was marked by an extensive year-long world tour that started on 13 February in Paris, and ended on 31 December in Toulouse. With more than 150 dates, Dalida toured Canada, Latin America, Arab states and Europe. The year debuted with a number-one hit in Latin America, "El Cordobés", which was a product of a collaboration with bullfighter Manuel Benítez, to whom Dalida dedicated the song as they had a brief affair. In the same period, Dalida also started employing family members, with her cousin Rosy as her secretary, and brother Bruno as her artistic director. By the end of the year, they had produced the successful Italian album Pensiamoci ogni sera and three more EPs. "Parlez-moi de lui" did not achieve commercial success, but became one of her first power ballads, being based on experiences in her own life, and became a commercial success in the US when recorded by Cher as "The Way of Love". In contrast, "Bang Bang" was a number one hit in Argentina and Italy, where it was also the best-selling record of the year. "Petit Homme" charted internationally and was accompanied by Dalida delivering energetic live performances with a tambourine. Dalida also returned to the wide screen, with a supporting role in the satirical French movie La Morale de l'histoire that included the unreleased song "Je sortirais sans toi". During the summer in Rome, she was introduced to the new avant-garde singer-songwriter Luigi Tenco on an RAI set and they sang "La danza di Zorba" as a duet. Later in September, her Italian managers suggested that she participate with Tenco in the next Sanremo Music Festival. Although in previous years she has turned down the festival, this time she accepted as she was in a secret relationship with Tenco.

==== Sanremo and Olympia 67; "The new Dalida is born!" ====
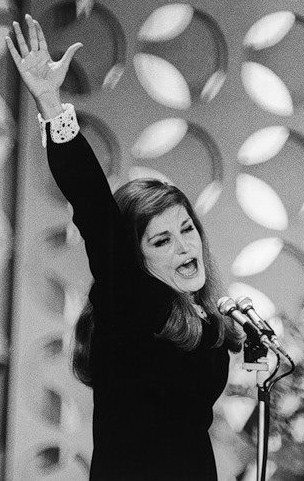
Dalida performing in Sanremo 1967

With "Mama" in January 1967, Dalida had success in France and Turkey, and was back at the top of the Italian charts later the same year. "Ciao amore, ciao", written and composed by Tenco, was released alongside as it had been chosen as their competing song for the Sanremo Music Festival. The festival premiered on 26 January and they both separately sang their own version. Under the influence of stage fright and alcohol, Tenco delivered a poor performance, while Dalida concluded the evening with an ovation, but eventually they were eliminated in the first round. The following night ended tragically when Tenco was found dead by Dalida in their hotel room. It was reported that a suicide note explained that he had taken his life owing to the elimination from the contest, as a protest against the corruption and bribery of the jury, but major suspicion of the involvement of the mafia emerged. Although the public did not know anything of their relationship, the event greatly affected Dalida and her next concert in Boulogne-Billancourt scheduled for 31 January was cancelled. The following week on 7 February, she appeared on the TV show Palmarès des chansons, dedicating her rendition of "Parlez-moi de lui" to Tenco. Wearing the same dress that she had been wearing when she found his body, the performance was highly sentimental but indicated nothing of an emerging depression. On 26 February, Dalida attempted to take her life, ended up in hospital and spent five days in a coma. The truth was revealed about her involvement with Tenco, leaving her worldwide public stunned. Her career was put on hiatus for three months.

Returning to television on 8 June, on the verge of tears she made her first TV appearance after four months, interpreting "Les Grilles de ma maison", a cover of Tom Jones' "Green, Green Grass of Home". With the lyrics "I was afraid that everything would be foreign to me, but nothing seems changed, it's good to open the gates of my house" the song was directly dedicated to her return to life, pointing at her Montmartre house. At the same time, her Italian album Dalida became a chart success and "Ciao amore, ciao" topped several international charts, earning Dalida another gold disc. She also organized a four-month-long comeback tour from June to September, again performing daily in the cities hosting the stages of the Tour de France. The late summer period brought a re-release of "Hava Nagila" from 1959, and a new recording "Je reviens the chercher", the French version of "Son tornata da te" by Tenco. In September, Dalida issued her first compilation album De Bambino à Il silenzio, collecting her hits from 1956 to 1965, which was also one of the first greatest hits albums.

On the night of 5 October, Dalida premiered her third Olympia concert residency, which ran for a month. New songs such as "J'ai décidé de vivre", "Entrez sans frapper" and "Loin dans le temps" marked a new direction in her career, orientating her repertoire towards more profound lyrics. Dressed in a long white dress that she would always wear on tours in future years, Dalida once again achieved a huge triumph at the venue. She was nicknamed Saint Dalida by the press. In France-Soir, Jacqueline Cartier wrote: "Dalida killed Mademoiselle Bambino. The new Dalida is born!".

==== "Le Temps des fleurs" ====
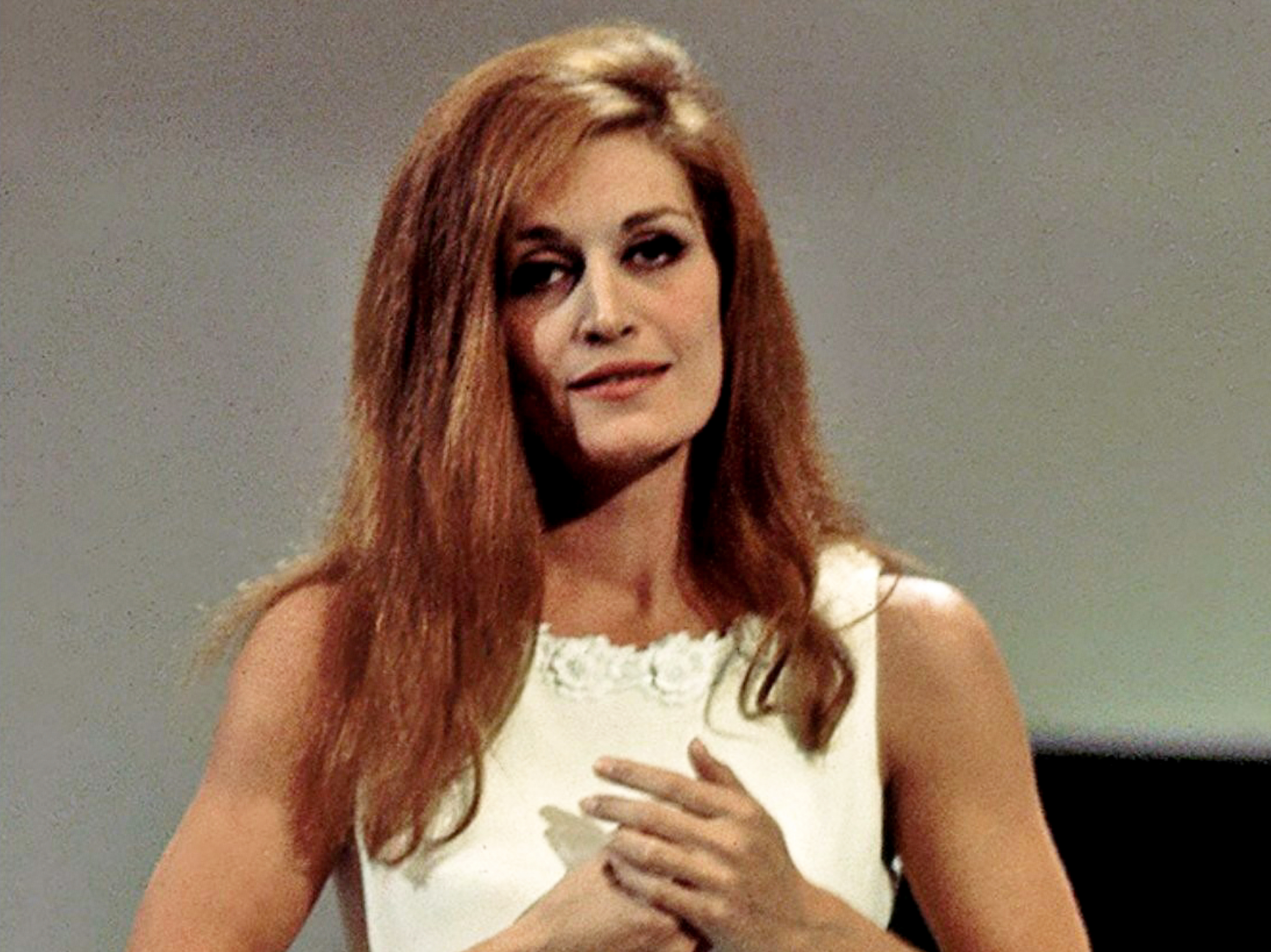
Dalida on Canzonissima in late 1967

After competing for four months in Canzonissima, then the most popular TV show in Italy, in January 1968 Dalida won with "Dan dan dan" that reached number two in the country. Dalida also came back to film for her first main role in five years, in Italian romantic drama Io ti amo, acting as stewardess Judy alongside Alberto Lupo. The movie was a minor success, but as it was filmed in colour and several of her new songs appeared in, it provided critically acclaimed music video for her latest Italian chart topper and gold certified "L'ultimo valzer". After the filming, Dalida embarked upon a two-year-long world tour that extended until early 1970. With more than 300 live performances it was Dalida's longest tour up to that moment and, as a part of it, in summer 1968 she participated in a popular Italian summer festival Cantagiro and won the main prize. In 1969, during the third leg that started on 9 January in Milan, for the first time in career Dalida performed in Yugoslavia and in Africa. After Gabon in December and in Tahiti in January 1970, the tour ended in Iran in February.

"Si j'avais des millions" and "La bambola" were minor hits of early 1968, but in September Dalida came back to huge success in France with "Le Temps des fleurs". It was an instant number one hit with a fair chart performance in several other countries, eventually being recorded in two more languages. The EP was reissued for five more times, a personal record for Barclay, receiving gold certificate and an album of the same name was released. With an issue in single format, "Le Temps des fleurs" also announced the end of a long EP era.

On 5 December 1968, in Paris city hall Hôtel de Ville, Dalida received the Medal of the president of the Republic from hands of General de Gaulle who summarised the "success, kindness and modesty of this woman" saying: "By giving you this medal, I wanted to honor a quality, a great lady of France." In France, she remains the only person from show-business to receive such distinction. During same event, Dalida became a Parisian citizen of honor, receiving the Medal of the city of Paris by the Council of Paris, and was also named "the Godmother of Montmartre pulbots", the old name for poor children of the neighborhood where she lived.

Spending 1969 on tour and private travellings to India, Dalida released several less successful recordings like "Zoum zoum zoum", "L'An 2005" and "Les Violons de mon pays", all poorly promoted on TV and radio attracting some success in Turkey and France. "Oh Lady Mary" was released in autumn and remained her last Italian hit. Returning to German TV, Dalida danced casatchok on her new song "Petruschka", which was followed with release of three new albums: Canta in italiano, In Deutsch and Ma mère me disait, a sales topper in Poland. Dalida was also awarded with MIDEM, award for the best selling artist of the year in Italy, and her first Radio Luxembourg singer of the year award, which she went on to win for several more times.

=== Les années Orlando – The Orlando years ===
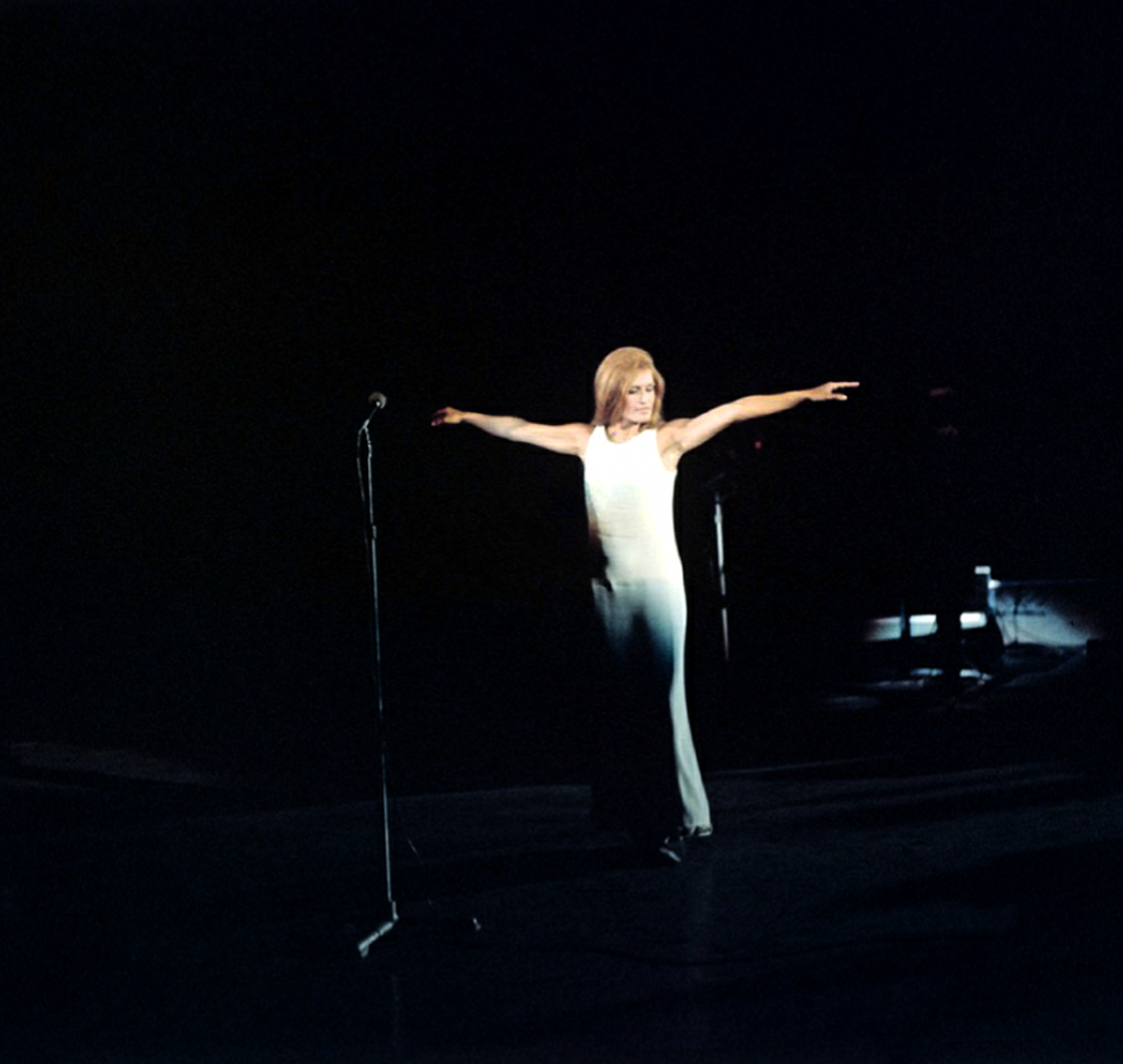
Dalida in Rome in 1968

Dalida and her brother Orlando were already planning for some time to form their own record house as a vehicle to release and to control her musical output. Dalida's last record released under Barclay label was Concerto pour une voix, an EP released on 15 April 1970. On 1 July Dalida signed a contract International Shows, recently established by Orlando, making him one of only several independent producers of French show business. Their first record "Darla dirladada" was also the first success of a very long series. Already played on radios for a month, the Greek folklore song was released as single on 15 July. "Darla dirladada" was an overnight hit, selling 75,000 copies within the first week and setting a record for largest weekly sales in France. The song became Dalida's another tube de l'été, staying three weeks atop of French sales charts during summer and gaining gold certification in a month. Soon after, Dalida released her second record under her new label, "Ils ont changé ma chanson", a cover of "What Have They Done to My Song Ma", reflecting a drastic change of her repertoire in past years. It was a moderate sales success, but it won her second Radio Luxembourg award. That was followed with "Pour qui pour quoi", her last record in EP format, and Ils ont changé ma chanson, the first album issued under International Show.

In October 1971, Dalida intended to book herself at Olympia for her big Parisian comeback after four years. Bruno Coquatrix did not believe in her change of style and refused to produce the show so Dalida rented and paid the venue by herself. On 24 November, announced by posters thirty meters long and four meters high on the Champs-Élysées, Dalida premiered a sold-out three-week-long concert residency, with Mike Brant as opening act. Dalida again triumphed, with public and critics plebiscite new repertoire nicknaming her "the queen of the theater" and "a modern Phaedra". Seeing the success, Coquatrix offered "Dali" to return whenever she wants "without having to pay a single cent". Premiere night was both recorded on video and as live album Olympia 71, published a year later alongside Il faut du temps, while the video was first issued in 2012.

Through 1971 and 1972 Dalida held a series of successful worldwide concerts in Asia, Canada, Europe, Lebanon and Latin America. She continued to choose her new songs only for their poetic value, but still paid less attention to their commercial promotion, again traveling to Asia to develop a better understanding of herself. Each time Dalida would appear on TV performing "Comment faire pour oublier", "Si c'était à refaire" or "Avec le temps", as Jacques Pessis said: "masses of crazed fans were chanting 'Dali' for the first time, their new nickname for her. She shaped her early 1970s image without even trying... just expressing natural emotions she carried in that period". Inspired by Jesus Christ Superstar, Dalida also experimented with religious themes in songs "Jésus bambino" and "Jésus Kitsch". She came back to high sales in September 1972 with "Parle plus bas", a cover of Godfather's title song. Peaking at number two and with over one-half million copies sold, it became a gross hit in France by the end of the year and received gold certificate.

==== "Paroles, paroles" and "Je suis malade" ====
In late 1972, Dalida recorded duet "Paroles, paroles" with her longtime friend Alain Delon whom she picked on her own. The lyrics, based on the original Italian version "Parole parole", tell a story of a man offering a woman "caramels, candies and chocolate" and repeats "you are so beautiful", to what she answers with "paroles, paroles" ("words, words") indicating that his words are nothing but hollow. The single released on 17 January with B-side "Pour ne pas vivre seul", topped charts in France, Japan, Mexico and Portugal, and had a fair performance in several other countries. Receiving a triple gold certification, it also spawned a dozen of international covers, inspiring foreign singers to record it in their native languages. Dalida and Delon never performed the song live, but Dalida performed for TV and concerts using his voice in playback. In the future decades, "Paroles paroles" went on to become one of the most notable songs in France, and a signature track of Dalida. The expression "paroles, paroles" also entered everyday language, used "to evoke those who make promises and never keep them".

In late July, Dalida released another song that went to become her signature track: "Je suis malade". The writer of the song Serge Lama recorded and released it earlier that year, but it did not receive any attention until it was spotted by Dalida who later mentioned: "when I saw it on television for the first time, I cried and I knew I have to record it". Dalida's intention to popularise Lama rather than getting a profit from song made her issue it as a B-side to single "Vado via". After the release and two performances, her version became a hit, but Lama's original also drew public attention. Dalida's gestures and facial expressions while performing "Je suis malade" were a natural expression of her personal connection to lyrics that deal with abandonment and despair. The renditions of the song during the future years left a huge impact on French society and shaped an image of Dalida, described by Vanity Fair as "ultimate drama queen". Both Lama and composer of the song Alice Dona frequently credited solely Dalida for being the one who made the song a success, and for boosting Lama's career. Eventually, covered by several singers mostly as tribute to Dalida, "Je suis malade" also became a song frequently sung at competitions.

==== 1973–1975: Zenith – "Gigi" and "18 ans" ====
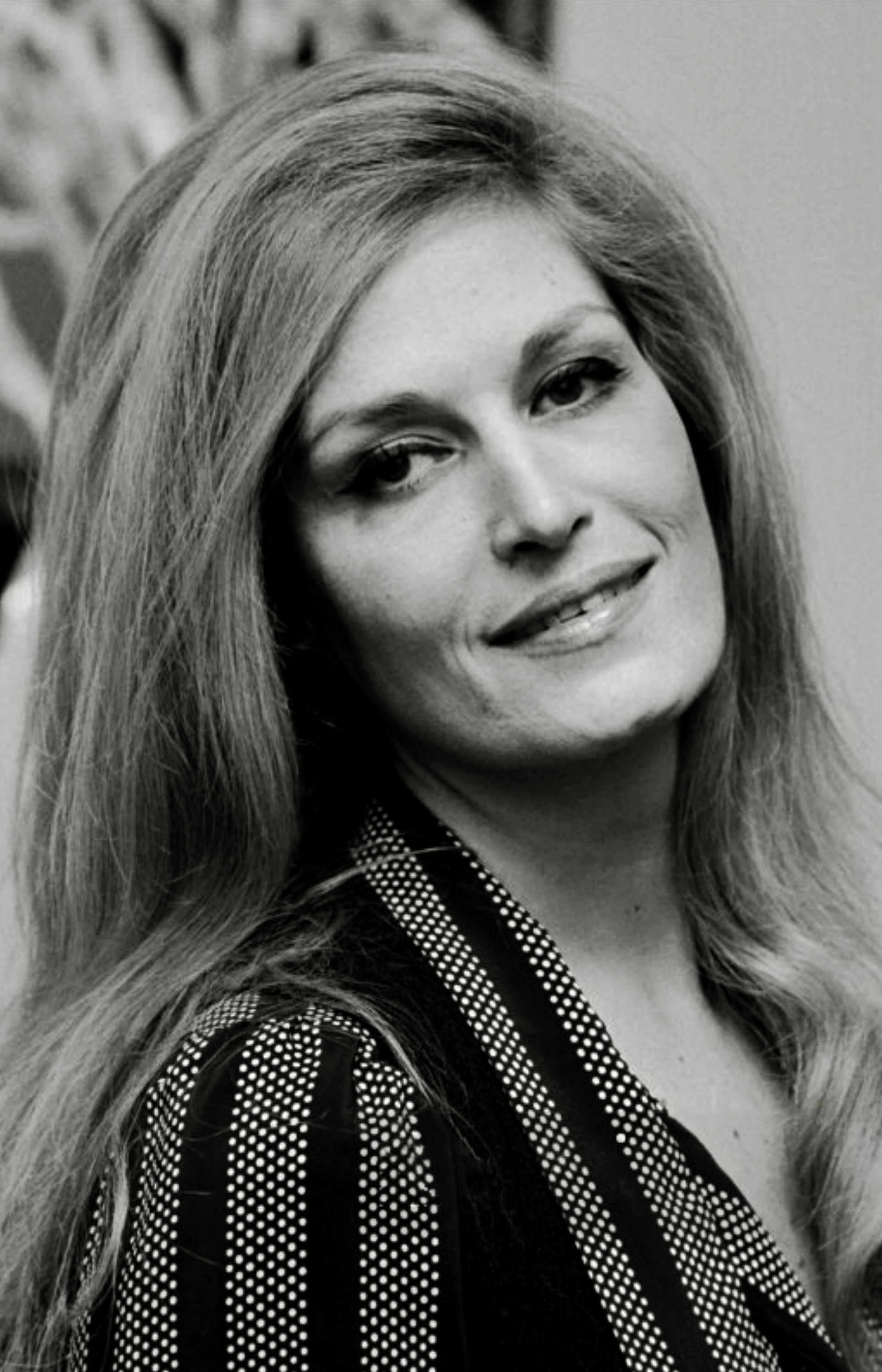
Dalida in 1974

By the end of 1973, Dalida released the promotional single A-side "Il venait d'avoir 18 ans" with B-side "Non ce n'est pas pour moi". In that same time, she released the album Julien that gathers most of her 1973 songs. The song "Il venait d'avoir 18 ans" quickly started gaining success and it was again released in the beginning of 1974 but as B-side to single A-side "Gigi l'amoroso". "Il venait d'avoir 18 ans" peaked number 3 in Québec, number 4 in Belgium, number 13 in Germany, and number 37 in Italy while "Gigi l'amoroso" beat the record held by Frank Sinatra's "Strangers in the Night" from 1966 for the most sold single in Benelux and charted number 4 in France and number 1 in Switzerland, number 2 in Netherlands, number 1 in Flanders, number 3 in Québec, number 2 in Spain and number 59 in Italy. The first performance of both songs was during her concerts in Olympia 1974. The whole four weeks were sold out and a triumph for the singer and was followed again with a live album, Olympia 75.

=== 1975–1980: Disco period ===
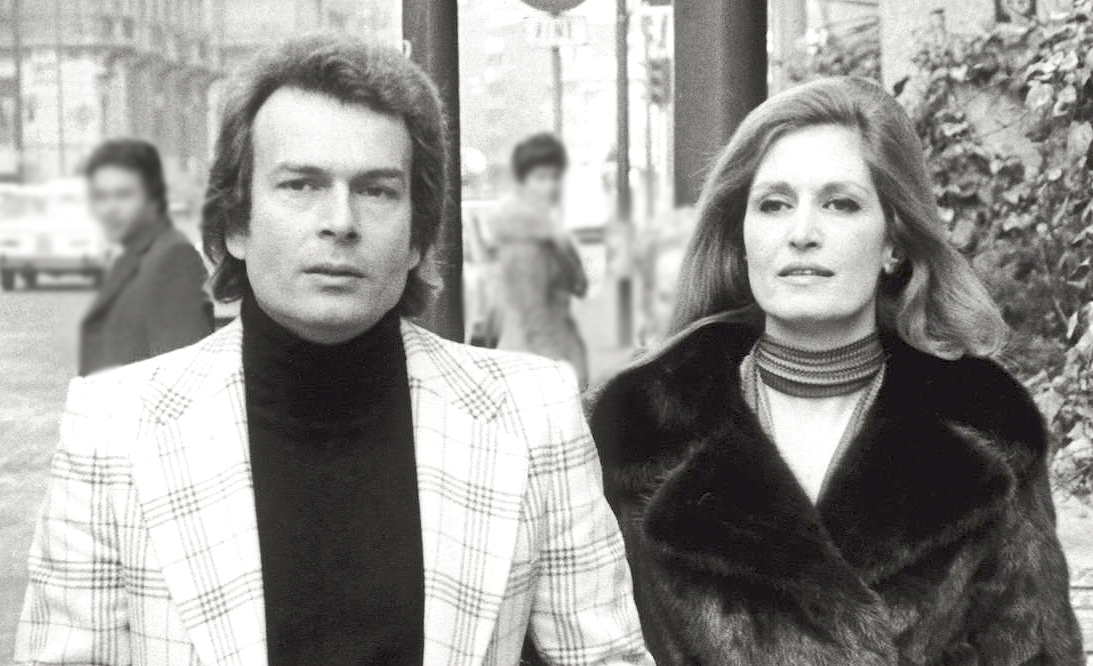
Dalida and Richard Chanfray in Milan, 1975

In February 1975, French music critics awarded the singer with the Prix de l'Académie du Disque Français (French Recording Academy Award). Touring from 1974 to 1975 would follow this period of unprecedented sales. During 1975, she released duet "Et de l'amour de l'amour" with her partner Richard Chanfray. This single peaked number 16 in France.

At the end of 1975, Dalida released a new album that gathered some songs from singles released in 1974 and 1975 plus some new material. Most of the songs were from the same genre except for the disco-genre song "J'attendrai". This song, released as a single in January 1976, reached number 1 on the French charts and was both first disco hit in France and disco hit in French language. Achieving that, Dalida holds the title of "the inventor of French disco". Around the same time, the popularity of variety shows increasing in France and Dalida started making television appearances on a weekly basis there and across Europe.

Following her disco success, in mid-1976 she released a new album with newly recorded songs, most of them disco. The most notable one was "Bésame mucho" (number 7 in France and number 10 in Turkey). 1977 was a successful year for Dalida both in her private and professional life. She released three albums. One of them was live Olympia 77, released following her again four-week triumph at Olympia in 1977. The other two were albums with completely new songs. "Salma ya salama" became the first ever Egyptian folk hit in the world. Originally sung in Egyptian Arabic, the song was translated into French, Italian, and German. Part of the lyrics are based on an old Egyptian folk song about homesickness and celebrating the Egyptian nation.

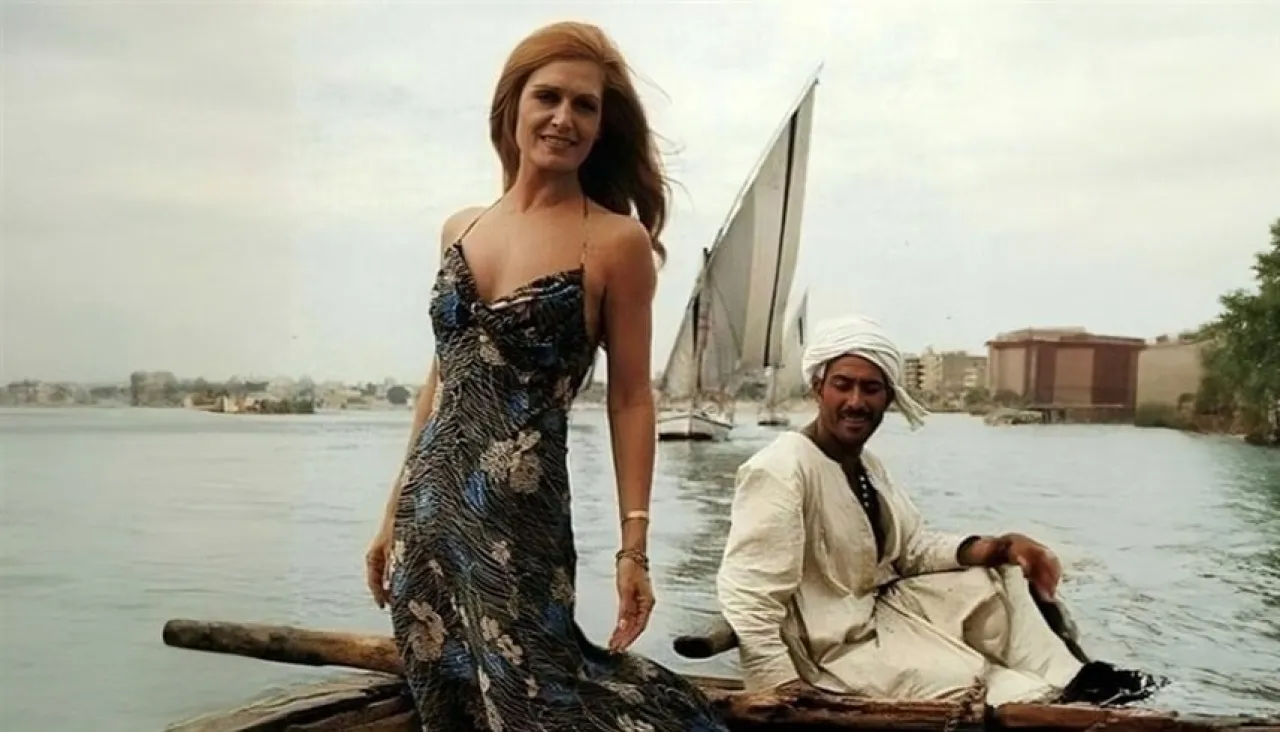
Dalida posing on a Felucca during a Nile cruise in Cairo, 1976

Dalida continued touring the world, including the US, for the second time since the 1950s, by playing two nights in New York City's Carnegie Hall in November 1978. The New York Times's review of the Carnegie Hall concert praised Dalida's performance and noted its intimacy and intensity after she began to converse midway through it, revealing her personality. Most of the audience were French citizens. The concerts were almost sold out, but nevertheless, it was another triumph for her. Due to the concert, she was offered for the second time a contract to perform in the US, but she refused it again. In February, during her 1977 Canada tour, an obsessed fan tried to kidnap her by using a hammer but did not succeed.

Other hit performances of Dalida include "The Lambeth Walk", sung in English and French, and aforementioned "Je suis malade", released in 1973 achieving success in 1977. In 1979, Dalida recorded her biggest disco hit, "Monday, Tuesday... Laissez-moi danser", written by Toto Cutugno. The song was a smash hit, peaking at number 1 on the French charts. By the end of 1979, she released the semi-biographical song "Comme disait Mistinguett" where she, through music, speaks about herself in a humorous way. Her debut of 1980 was marked by the release of a big disco hit, "Rio do Brasil". Then she released the album Gigi in Paradisco, named for the title song, which was a sequel to her previous hit "Gigi l'amoroso".

In 1979, Dalida met Lester Wilson. Agreeing to work together he became her choreographer for the upcoming spectacle in the Paris Palais des Sports, booked for January 1980. In total, Dalida performed for three hours per day for fifteen days with ten costume changes and twelve dancers in front of an audience of around 90,000 people. At Palais des Sports, the largest playing venue in Paris and one of the biggest in France, there was much the same triumph as in Olympia.

Following the spectacle, Dalida released the double live album Le Spectacle du Palais des Sports 1980 and organized a new European tour and a small World tour. She toured in the whole Western and Eastern Europe except Yugoslavia and the Soviet Union. Also, she held concerts in Brazil, the US and Canada. When she came back, she organized a tour across the whole of France delivering more than 20 sold-out concerts monthly across the French towns and cities. In 1980, problems in her private life appeared again and were reflected in the song "À ma manière".

==== 1981–1987: Diva trademark years ====
Dalida left disco and started singing slower, moody, deep-minded songs with typical 1980s instruments. From March to April 1981, she gave a month of sold-out concerts at the Olympia in Paris, emulating her successful 1980 tour. Her last concert of April 1981 at the Olympia became her last concert at that venue, because the following year, the Olympia went bankrupt (it re-opened in 1989). On the night of her inaugural performance, she became the first singer to be awarded a diamond disc, in recognition of her record sales which had reached 45 million. Olympia was followed up by the release of her last named Olympia album, Olympia 81, but this time, it was not recorded live. She refused to be a model for Marianne of France. Instead of disco, Dalida started to record dance songs, which had soon replaced disco in French clubs. At the end of 1981, she starred in a New Year TV spectacle called Special Dalida. She co-hosted and sang her songs.

At the beginning of 1982, she had many TV appearances singing still unreleased songs, followed by the release of a new dance album, Special Dalida. The most remembered songs of the album are the dance songs "Jouez bouzouki", "Danza" and the moody "Nostalgie". Dalida was growing older, yet she launched a new world tour in 1982, spending most of the years from 1982 to 1984 playing sold-out concerts Rio de Janeiro to Europe and Asia. She made a lot of TV appearances in the 1980s almost every second week. In the summer of 1982, during the FIFA World Cup, like many other singers, Dalida released a song for the French team, "La chanson du Mundial" (number 17 in France).

In the first part of 1983, she released several songs, the most notable being "Mourir sur scène". The dance-pop song has very profound lyrics and has remained a big hit, one of the signature tracks by Dalida. Most of her songs of 1983 were gathered on her album released in mid-1983, Les P'tits Mots, which also featured such singles as "Lucas" and "Bravo".

By the beginning of 1984, her personal difficulties escalated again; she could not dedicate as much time to her career as she would have wanted. However, she recorded a new collection of mainly dance songs including "Soleil" and "Kalimba de luna". In mid-1984, she recorded the album Dali, a collection of all her songs released that year. To promote the album, a television special was later released on VHS named Dalida idéale; it was filmed in 1984, and directed by the then highly rated Jean-Christophe Averty. It includes Dalida singing in seven languages and dancing her way through a huge number of her earlier hits with the best video effects available at the time and wearing more than 40 outfits from the best French and international fashion designers, maintaining her "Glamour" and "DIVA" trademarks gained during the disco era in the late seventies.

She successfully engaged to keep the new radio station NRJ on air through her connections.

Dalida's eye problems returned. She underwent two major eye operations in 1985 and put her career on hold as the stage lights started to become difficult for her to endure. She released "Reviens-moi", a cover of George Michael's "Last Christmas". In early 1985, Dalida occasionally performed live and made numerous TV appearances. When her eyes recovered in mid-1985, she accepted the role of a young grandmother in the Youssef Chahine film The Sixth Day. The latter would become a commercial failure in France despite very favorable media criticism, especially from intellectuals. Little more than 50,000 entries would be made. As she always wanted to become an actress, she temporarily disregarded her singing career and fully devoted herself to the movie. She returned to France to promote it in late 1985.

In 1986, she released Le Visage de l'amour with more new recordings and some singles from the album, which became her last album. "Le Temps d'aimer" and "Le Vénitien de Levallois" were songs that failed to hit the charts upon their release. She did promote the album but not as well as she used to do previously, due to issues in her private life which had never been worse since 1967. Dalida, therefore, began spending more and more time alone at home or going out with friends to pass the time, further neglecting her career. Dalida ceased to create new material in the recording studio, instead devoting herself to perform concerts. Once again organising a lot of concerts on a monthly basis and singing her previously known hits, Dalida was then known for the amazing "show" performances, wearing her wardrobe from 1980 to 1982. She sang glamorous disco-dance songs from same period such as "Je suis toutes les femmes", "Gigi in paradisco", "Il faut danser reggae", "Monday, Tuesday...", "Comme disait Mistinguett".

By the beginning of 1987, Dalida was falling into a severe depression. A vacation offered no relief, and despite her struggles, she managed to mask her pain, giving the glamorous appearance of someone who still loved life. Although no new songs had been recorded, she toured internationally from Los Angeles to the Middle East. Being part of the music spotlight in 1978, many of her songs appeared daily on TV, as well as many notable TV appearances on talk shows from 1986 to 1987. Her last live TV appearance was at the César Awards night of March 7, 1987. Her last live performance took place in Antalya, Turkey from 27 to 29 April 1987, just before her suicide. Her performance was not recorded by the national television of Turkey which was the only TV channel in the country.

== Personal life and death ==
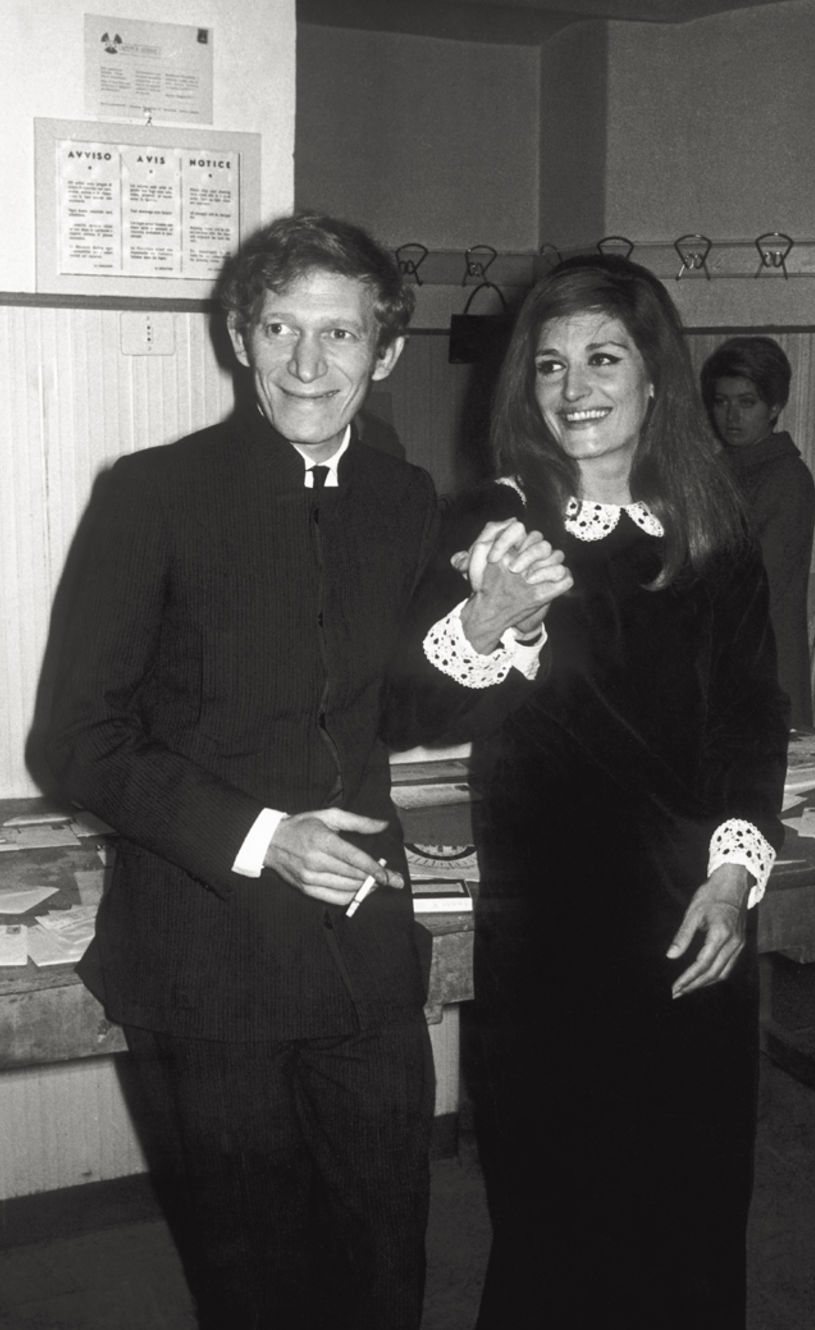
Dalida with Lucien Morisse in 1961

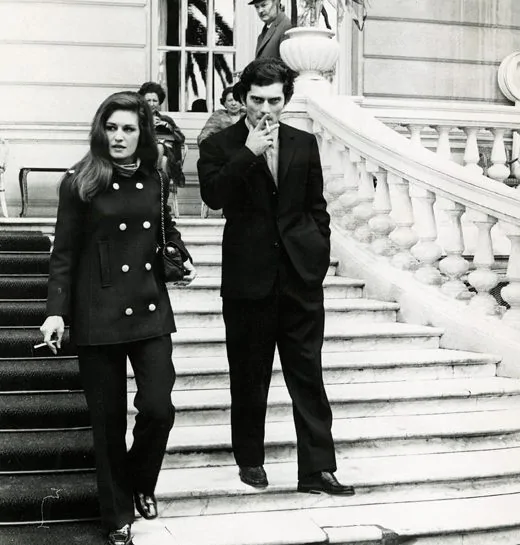
Dalida with Luigi Tenco in January 1967

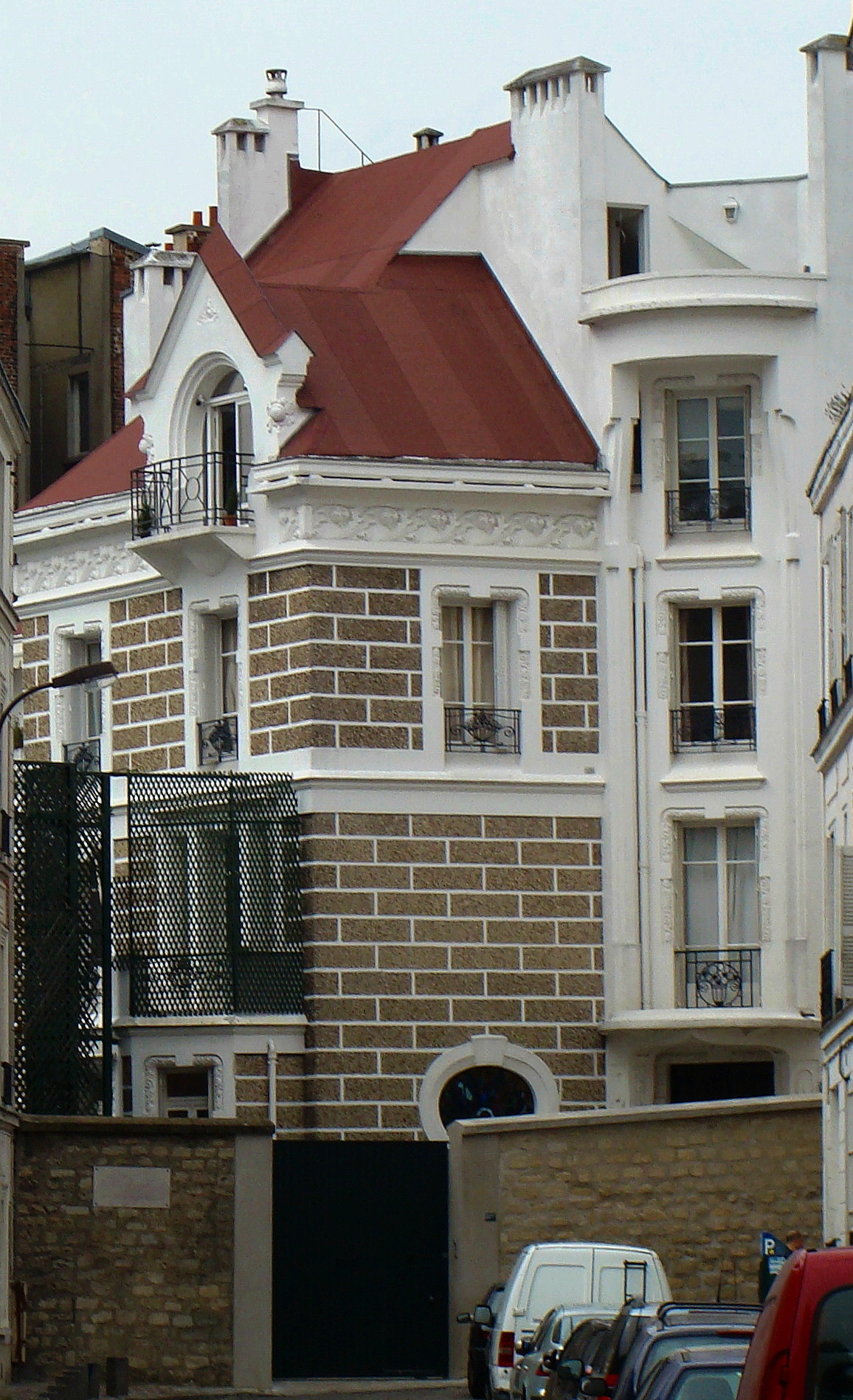
Dalida's house at rue d'Orchampt, Montmartre, Paris

Dalida's private life was marred by a series of failed relationships, personal problems and the suicides of several people close to her.

In January 1967, she took part in the Sanremo Festival with her new lover, Italian singer, songwriter, and actor Luigi Tenco. The song he presented was "Ciao amore, ciao" ("Bye Love, Bye"), which he sang together with Dalida, but Tenco failed despite Dalida's performance. Tenco died by suicide on 27 January 1967, after learning that his song had been eliminated from the final competition. He was found by Dalida in his hotel room with a bullet wound in his left temple and a note announcing that his gesture was against the jury and public's choices during the competition. Prior to Tenco's suicide, Dalida and he had become engaged. One month later, Dalida attempted to take her own life by drug overdose at the Prince de Galles hotel in Paris. She spent five days in a coma and several months convalescing. Dalida returned to the stage the following October.

In December 1967, she became pregnant by a 22-year-old Italian student, Lucio. She had an abortion that left her infertile.

In September 1970, her former husband Lucien Morisse, to whom she was married from 1956 to 1961, killed himself by shooting himself in the head.

In April 1975, her close friend, singer Mike Brant, leapt to his death from an apartment in Paris. He was 28. Dalida had contributed to his success in France when he opened concerts for her in 1971 at L'Olympia.

In July 1983, Richard Chanfray, her lover from 1972 to 1981, killed himself by inhaling the exhaust gas of his Renault 5. Dalida's last relationship was with François Naudy.

=== Death ===
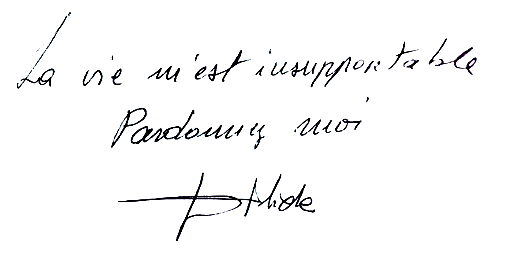
Dalida's suicide note, which reads, "La vie m'est insupportable. Pardonnez-moi." ("Life is unbearable for me. Forgive me.")

On the night of 2 to 3 May 1987, Dalida died by suicide at her house in Montmartre by overdosing on barbiturates. She left behind a note which read: La vie m'est insupportable. Pardonnez-moi. ('Life is unbearable for me. Forgive me'). She had last performed in Turkey and the last person to see her alive was Eddy Despretz.

Dalida is buried at the Montmartre Cemetery, 18th Division, Chemin des Gardes.

== Legacy ==
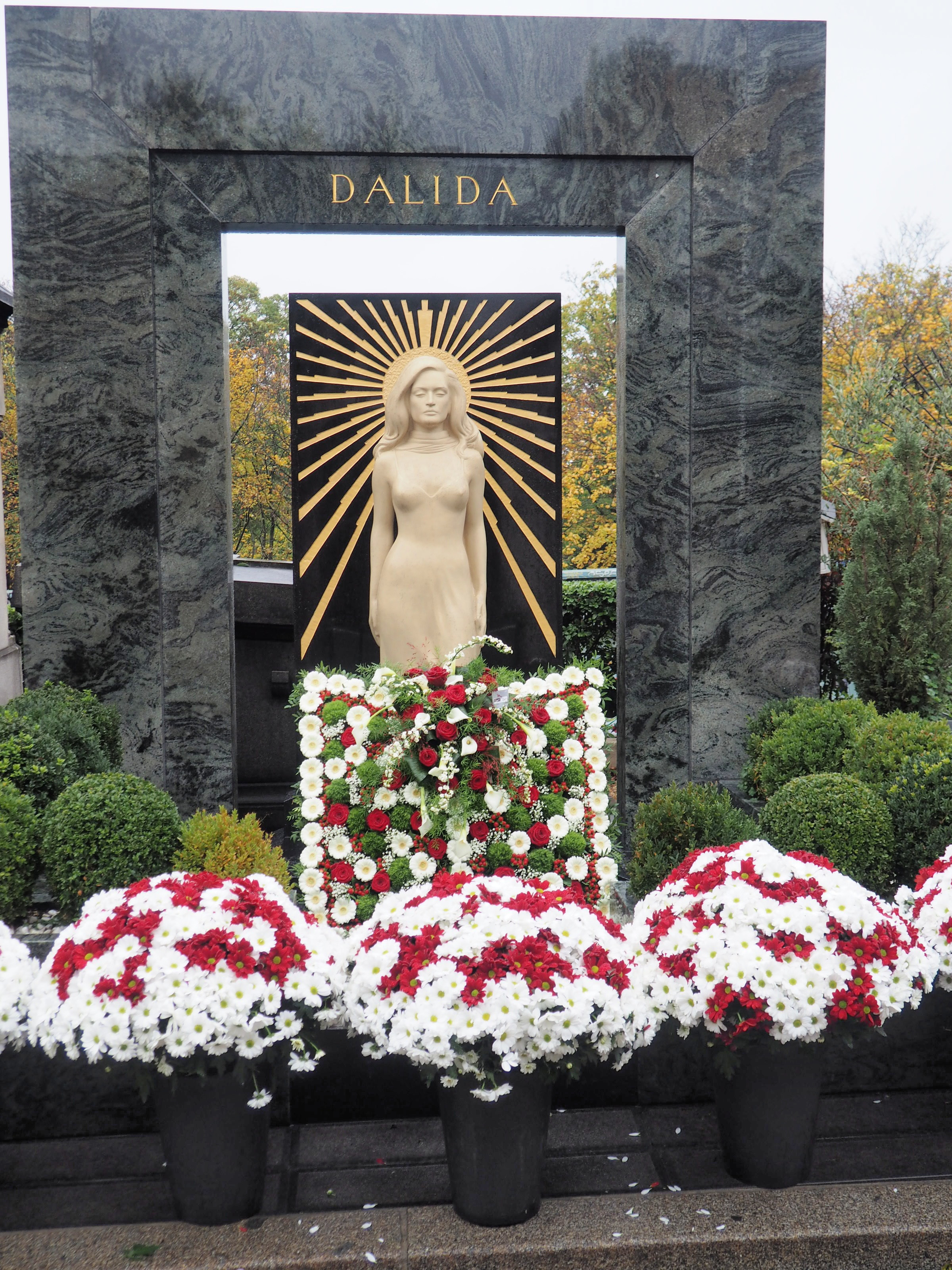
Dalida's grave in the Montmartre Cemetery

Dalida is viewed as a gay icon in France (originally in relation to her 1973 hit "Il venait d'avoir 18 ans") and the Middle East, claiming that Egypt used to be an example of a society accepting of homosexuals.

Her output has also been the subject of various remix albums. Since her death, many of Dalida's hits have been remixed to modern techno and dance beats. Around 50 biographies have been written in her name. Place Dalida, a square on Montmartre, Paris, bears her name, and a street "Rue Dalida" in Laval, Quebec, Canada.

In 2005, Dalida was voted "Top 58th French person of all time" in a survey sponsored by the France 2 television channel. The only women from the show business which appeared in this list were Catherine Deneuve, Brigitte Bardot, Simone Signoret, Édith Piaf and Dalida.

=== Tributes ===
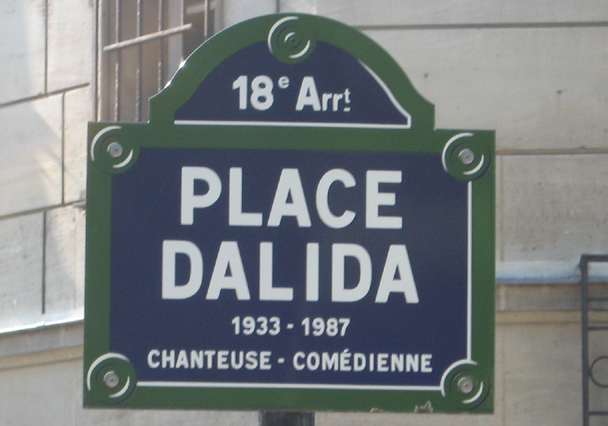
Place Dalida plaque at Montmartre

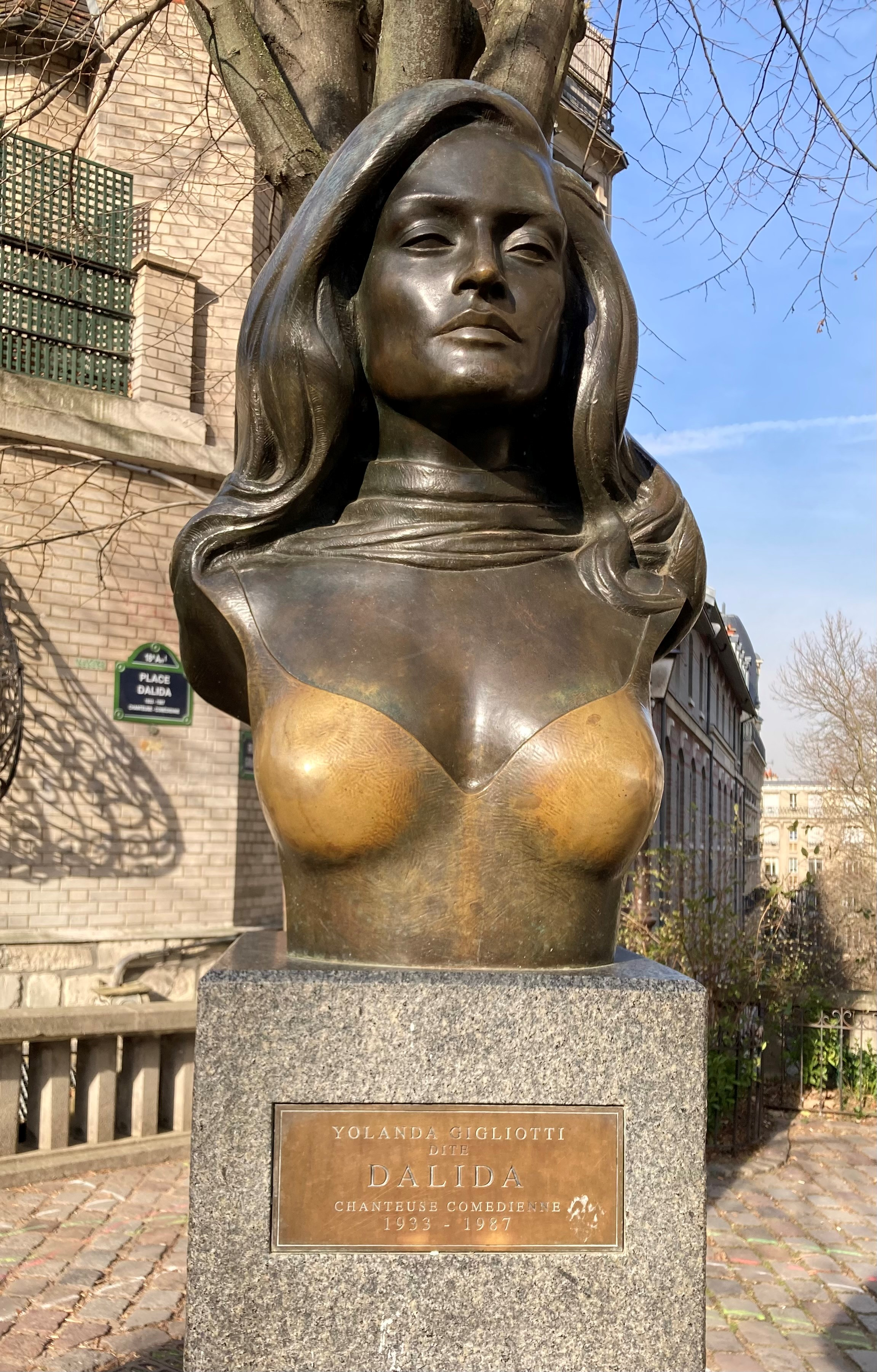
Bust sculpture of Dalida in Place Dalida

- In 1987, Dalida was honoured with a commemorative coin minted by the French mint, Monnaie de Paris, issued in gold, bronze and silver, bearing her likeness.
- In 1996, the Place Dalida (Dalida Square) was established at Montmartre, Paris. In 1997, on the occasion of the 10th anniversary of her death, a bronze bust of her by Alain Aslan was added to square.
- On 27 October 1998, a tribute was held in Cairo and the "Dalida Prize" was established and awarded in her honour.
- In 2001, the French government honoured her with a second stamp bearing her likeness which was released by La Poste, the French postal service, as part of the Artistes de chanson ("Song Artists") series. During the eleven months the stamp was available, 10,157,601 copies were sold.
- In 2007, the first of two big expos dedicated to Dalida, "Dalida Expo" was held at the Paris City Hall to commemorate the 20th anniversary of her death with an exhibit of her outfits, personal belongings, makeup, documents and previously unreleased photographs. During its four months, the exposition was visited by 300,000 people.
- In 2017, the second exposition dedicated to her, Dalida Expo, was held in Palais Galliera to commemorate the 30th anniversary of her death. During its three months, the exposition was visited by nearly 80,000 people.
- In 2019, she was featured as a Google Doodle on what would have been her 86th birthday.

=== Depictions ===
Several theatrical productions have been made about Dalida's life.

- In 1999, the play Solitudini – Luigi Tenco e Dalida, written and directed by Maurizio Valtieri, was performed in Rome.
- Dalida: Une Vie, directed by René Simard and under the authorization of Orlando Productions, was performed from October 2003 to June 2006, in Quebec, Canada, and was shown in Beirut, Lebanon in May 2004.
- In 2002, the first TV show for marking the 15th anniversary of her death Dalida, 15 ans déjà (Dalida, 15 years already).
- In 2005, the first biopic of Dalida, two-part telefilm Dalida, was broadcast on France 2, attracted an average of 6.3 million viewers.
- In 2005, the play Dalida, à quoi bon vivre au mois de mai ?, written by Joseph Agostini and Caroline Sourrisseau, was performed at the Ateliers Theatre in Montmartre.
- In 2012, the TV show Dalida, 25 ans déjà (Dalida, 25 years already) marked the 25th anniversary of her death.
- In 2017, the film Dalida, directed by Lisa Azuelos and assisted by Orlando Productions, featured Sveva Alviti as Dalida. The film achieved moderate success. Its premiere was at Olympia Music Hall.

== Filmography ==
Year	Title	Role	Ref
1954	The Mask of Tutankhamun	A spy	
1954	A Glass and a Cigarette	Iolanda	
1954	Injustice Is Forbidden		
1958	Vice Squad	Herself	
1958	Operation Abduction	Bella Morena	
1961	Che femmina... e che dollari!	Laura Pisani	
1963	Stranger from Hong Kong	Georgia	
1965	Menage all'italiana	Armida	
1966	La Morale de l'histoire	Colette	
1968	13 jours en France	Herself (uncredited)	
1968	Io ti amo		
1977	Dalida: Pour toujours	Herself	
1986	The Sixth Day	Saddika	

== Awards ==
Year	Award	Country	Category	Result
1954	Miss Ondine Cairo	Egypt	Beauty competition/pageant	Second Place
1958	Radio Monte Carlo Oscar Awards	France	Radio Monte Carlo Oscar	Won
1958	Paris Olympia music hall Bravos	France	Paris Olympia music hall Bravos (Shared recognition with Yves Montand)	Won
1959	Platinum Oscar Awards	Italy	Platinum Oscar Award	Won
1959	Golden Wolf Awards	Italy	Golden Wolf Award	Won
1959	L'Oscar de la chanson Awards	France	L'Oscar de la chanson Award for Best Song	Won
1959	Radio Monte Carlo Oscar Awards	France	Radio Monte Carlo Oscar	Won
1960	Grand Prix Awards	Italy	Grand Prix Award for Best Italian Song (Shared award with Charles Aznavour)	Won
1961	Radio Monte Carlo Oscar Awards	Italy	Radio Monte Carlo Oscar	Won
1962	Radio Monte Carlo Oscar Awards	Italy	Radio Monte Carlo Oscar (Shared award with Johnny Hallyday)	Won
1963	Radio Monte Carlo Oscar Awards	France	Radio Monte Carlo Oscar for Most Successful International Artist	Won
1964	Juke Box Global Oscar Awards	Italy	Juke Box Global Oscar for The Year's Most-Played Artist on Jukeboxes in Italy	Won
1965	Chico Viola Prize	Brazil	Chico Viola Prize for "Zorba o Greco"	Won
1966	Paris Olympia music hall Bravos	France	Les Bravos du Musique Hall	Won
1967	Golden Caravel Awards	Italy	Golden Caravel Award	Won
1968	Canzonissima Oscar	Italy	Canzonissima Oscar	Won
1969	MIDEM Prize	Italy	MIDEM Prize for Highest Selling Musical Artist	Won
1969	Radio Luxembourg Hit Parade Oscar Awards	France	Radio Luxembourg Hit Parade Oscar	Won
1969	Radio Luxembourg Hit Parade Oscar Awards	France	Radio Luxembourg Hit Parade Oscar	Won
1972	Popularity Oscar	France	Popularity Oscar for Most Popular Artist	Won
1973	APPCB (Association Professionnelle de la Presse Cinématographique Belge) Awards	Belgium	Gold Medal Award	Won
1974	Golden Gigi award	Spain	Golden Gigi Award (Special award) for Extraordinary Record Sales	Won
1974	Golden Heart Awards	Spain	Golden Heart Award for Most Popular Artist in Spain	Won
1975	L'Académie du Disque Français Awards	France	Global Oscar Award (Oscar Mondial du Disque) for "Gigi l'amoroso" and "Il venait d'avoir 18 ans"	Won
1975	Oscar Awards	France	Eight Oscar Awards awarded at the Olympia "in recognition of extraordinary, rare, and, distinguished achievements"	Won
1975	Golden Lion Awards	Germany	Golden Lion	Won
1976	French Summer Carnaval Awards	France	French Summer Carnaval Award	Won
1976	French Academy Awards	France	French Academy Award for a number one single in nine countries	Won
1979	Radio Monte Carlo Awards	France	Belgium – Music Award	Won
1981	Goldene Europa Awards	Germany	Goldene Europa for Artist of the Year in Germany	Won
1984	Legion of Honour	France	Highest French order of merit for military and civil merits	Declined
1985	Golden Butterfly Awards	Turkey	Golden Butterfly Award	Won
1987	Dalida Award	Turkey	Dalida Award (Special Award) for Best Performance in Brussels, Belgium	Won

=== Honours and decorations ===
- Commander of the Ordre des Arts et des Lettres of the French Republic.
- (Italy) 1962: Honorary citizen of Calabria.
- (France) 1968: Godmother of Montmartre street urchins.
- (France) 1980: Honorary citizen of Graulhet.

== See also ==
- List of Dalida live performances
- List of Dalida music in motion pictures and TV
- Mononymous persons
- Culture of France
- Music of France
- Music of Italy
- Music of Egypt
