= List of Dalida live performances =

This is an incomplete list of the live performances undertaken by Egyptian-Italian then French singer Dalida.

== 1950s ==
=== 1955 ===
- Villa d'Este
- Drap d'Or

=== 1956 ===
- 9 April — Paris (Olympia); Numéro un de demain

=== 1957 ===
- 27 February to 19 March — Paris (Olympia); vedette anglaise of C. Aznavour
- 19 April to 1er May — Paris (Bobino); vedette américaine of O. Laure
- 8 May — Paris (Olympia); Musicorama
- Tour of 40 days with J. Valton et A. Cordy
- 10 May — Gala des étoiles à Bordeaux
- 15 May — Gala des étoiles
- 19 September to 9 October — Paris (Olympia); vedette américaine of G. Bécaud
- Paris (Olympia); vedette américaine of Compagnons de la chanson
- Octobre — Tour in north
- 14 December - Bruxelles (Ancienne Belgique)
- 16 December - Bruxelles (Cirque royal); nuit électrique
- Marseille (Alcazar)

=== 1958 ===
- Tour with J. Yanne
- 6 March - Paris (Olympia); Musicorama
- été - Algeria
- 23 August - Orange (Théatre antique)
- 9 to 28 October - Paris (Bobino)
- Avignon

=== 1959 ===
- Tour in Algeria
- 21 February - Liège
- April - Le Caire (Rivoli)
- 14 May - Paris (Olympia); Musicorama
- 27 May - Nancy (Gala des étoiles)
- 2 June - Orléans (Gala des étoiles)
- 9 June - Lyon (Gala des étoiles)
- 25 June - Berlin (Deutschland hall)
- 31 July - Genève (Switzerland)

17 juillet : Plombières

19 juillet : Remoulins

21 juillet : Hossegor

23 juillet : Le Touquet

26 juillet : Valras

29 juillet : Royat

30 juillet : Divonne

31 juillet : Genève

2 août : Aix-les-Bains

3 août : Annecy

5 août : La Baule

6 août : Deauville

7-8 août : Knokke

11 août : Juan-les-Pins

13 août : Nice

14 août : Beaulieu

15 août : San Remo

16 août : Saint-Raphaël

19 août : Juan-les-Pins

20 août : Grau-du-Roi

21 août : Le Canet

22 août : Nice

23 août : Cannes

26 août : Monaco

27 août : Dieulefit

29 août : La Rochelle

30 août : Trouville

- 23 September to 12 October - Paris (Théâtre de l'étoile)
- 22 October to 2 November - Paris (Bobino)
- 7 November - Bruxelles (Ancienne Belgique)
- 13 décembre - Lausanne, Théâtre de Beaulieu (Switzerland)

== 1960s ==
=== 1960 ===
- 16 April - Knokke le Zoute
- 24 May - Montpellier (Gala des étoiles)

=== 1961 ===
- 18 February 1961 - Téhéran
- Tour with D. Gérard et J.J. Debout
- Tour with R. Anthony
- 14 March - Nancy (Gala des étoiles)
- 20 May - Oostende (Kuursal Oostende)
- 1er August - Arcachon
- 27 August - Saint-Raphaël (Théâtre de Verdure)
- 30 August - Juan les pins
- November - Tour of 20 days in south and east of France
- 3 December - Lyon (Palais d'hiver)
- 7 December et suivants - Paris (Olympia)
- 30 December - Bruxelles (Ancienne Belgique)

=== 1962 ===
- April - one month tour in Italy
- July - Saïgon (Théâtre Rex)
- 5 August - Pologne (Casino Riva-Bella)
- 8 August - Montreux, Casino (Switzerland)
- 12 August - Genève, Fêtes de Genève (Switzerland)
- 18 December - Paris (Musicorama)
- Espagne
- Canada

=== 1963 ===
- 24 June - Jambes; Tour de France
- July - Pologne
- 24 December (or 1964) - Taormina (Casino Kursal)

=== 1964 ===
- 23 mai - Genève (Switzerland)
- Tour à partir du 14 June with Romuald et Henri Tisot
- 26 June - Fribourg, Théâtre Livio (Switzerland)
- 28 June - Thonon les bains
- 13 July - Orléans
- 13 August - Draguignan
- 3 to 21 September - Paris (Olympia)
- September - Tourtelle
- 7 October - Bruxelles (Cinéma Métropole)
- Marseille (Gymnase)

=== 1965 ===
- 2 February - Paris (Olympia); Musicorama
- Mars - Paris (Bobino); Musicorama
- 26 June - Angoulème
- June - Maroc
- 9 July - Montreux (Switzerland)
- 24 July - Beaucaire
- 9 August - Montreux (Switzerland)
- 11 August - Eze
- August - Saint-Jean de Tyrosse
- December - Algeria; Tlemcem, Sidi bel abbes, Oran, Mostaganée, ...

=== 1966 ===
- 13 February - Paris (Olympia); Musicorama
- 27 March - Monaco (Sporting)
- 2 April - Villiers en lieu
- 3 April - Sagy
- 30 April - Forêt de Moulières
- 28 April to 4 May - Gala en Espagne
- Mont Saint-Michel
- 6 May - Toulouse
- 15 May - Longwy
- 28 May - Epinay sur seine
- 2 June - Mariage d'Orlando à Rome
- 4 June - Mehun sur Yèvre
- 5 June - Bessèges
- 8 et 9 June - Casablanca
- 12 June - Givor
- 18 June - Montrond
- 19 June - Amiens
- 25 to 29 June - Tchécoslovaquie; Festival of Bratislava and Prague
- 2 July - Belleville en Beaujolais
- 3 July - Grenoble
- 10 July - Lapalisse
- 12 July - La roche posay
- 13 July - Ile d'Yeu
- 16 July - Briare
- 17 July - Lamothe Beuvron
- 17 July - Douai les fontaines; fête de la rose
- 19 July - Néris
- 21 July - Valbonne
- 24 July - Fourmies
- 27 July - Pornichet (Casino)
- 31 July - Saint-Girons
- 1er August - Orthez
- 7 August - Saint-Paul de fenouillet
- 8 August - Villeneuve de Marsan
- 12 August - Colmar
- 14 August - Magnac laval
- 15 August - Villefranche
- 22 August - Fabras
- 27 August - Nice
- 29 August - Bergerac
- 1er October - Paris (Mutualité)
- 6 October - Langres
- 8 October - Le Gornay-sur-Marne
- 16 October - Landrecis
- 29 October - Berne (Switzerland)
- 6 November - Lyon (Bourse du travail)
- November - Tananarive; 2 galas
- November - Saint-Denis; Réunion, 2 galas
- 2 December - Notre-Dame de Gravenchon
- 4 December - Hassi Messaoud; Algeria, and other galas
- 31 December - Toulouse
- Armentière

=== 1967 ===
- 25 et 26 January - Sanremo festival
- 25 February - Maisse
- 21 June to 4 September: Tour Europe 1 et Antargaz; 21–28 June: Circuit du Midi-Libre; 29 June - 23 July: Tour de France; 27 July - 4 September: Tour des plages
- 21 June - Lons-le-Saunier
- 22 June - Dijon
- 23 June - Troyes
- 24 June - Reims
- 25 June - Sarcelles
- 26 June - Meulan
- 27 June - Vernon
- 28 June - Angers
- 29 June - Laval
- 30 June - Saint-Malo
- 1er July - Caen
- 2 July - Amiens
- 3 July - Roubaix
- 4 July - Jambes
- 5 July - Metz
- 6 July - Strasbourg
- 7 July - Belfort
- 9 July - Divonne-les-bains
- 10 July - Briançon
- 11 July - Digne
- 12 July - Marseille
- 13 July - Carpentras
- 14 July - Sète
- 16 July - Toulouse
- 17 July - Luchon
- 18 July - Pau
- 19 July - Bordeaux
- 20 July - Limoges
- 21 July - Clermont
- 22 July - Fontainebleau
- 23 July - Versailles
- 27 July - Royan
- 28 July - Saint-Pierre-d'Oleron
- 29 July - Chatelaillon
- 30 July - La Rochelle
- 31 July - Saint-Martin-De-Re
- 1er August - La Tranche
- 2 August - Les Sables
- 3 August - Lorient
- 4 August - Noirmoutier
- 5 August - saint-Brevin
- 6 August - Nantes
- 7 August - La Baule
- 8 August - Saint-Nazaire
- 9 August - Vannes
- 10 August - Carnac
- 11 August - Quiberon
- 12 August - Quimperlé
- 13 August - Pontivy
- 14 August - Quimper
- 15 August - Morgat
- 16 August - Brest
- 17 August - Saint-Quay-Portrieux
- 18 August - Perros Guirrec
- 19 August - Dinard
- 20 August - Avranches
- 21 August - Granville
- 22 August - Courseulles
- 23 August - Cabourg
- 24 August - Deauville
- 25 August - Le Havre
- 26 August - Fécamp
- 27 August - Dieppe
- 28 August - Le Treport
- 29 August - Berck Plage
- 30 August - Boulogne-sur-Mer
- 31 August - Calais
- 1er September - Dunkerque
- 2 September - Douai
- 3 September - Arras
- 4 September - Rouen
- 5 to 23 October - Paris (Olympia)
- 17 October - Gonflans-Saint-Honorine
- November - Gala à travers la France
- 2 December - Melun
- 3 December - Pont de veau
- 4 December - Meaux
- 11 December - Thionville
- 12 December - Nancy

=== 1968 ===
- 10 February - Gstaad, Hôtel Windsor (Switzerland)
- 14 February - Grenoble
- 17 to 27 February - Tour Italie
- 17 March - Saint Hilaire Les Loges
- 23 March - Bourgoin
- 30 March - Beaupreau
- 31 March - Challan
- 13 April - Chasselay
- 28 April - Niort
- 30 April - Longwy
- May - Amérique du Sud (10 jours)
- May - Canada (1 week)
- May - Antilles (1 week)
- May - Japon (10 jours)
- Italie - Cantagiro
- 19 June présentation à San Remo
- 20 June Cueno
- 21 June Borgosesia
- 22 June Savona
- 23 June Sestri Levante
- 24 June Genova
- 25 June Marina di Massa
- 26 June Montecatini
- 27 June Follonica
- 28 June Ostia
- 29 June Torre del Greco
- 30 June repos
- 1 July Perugia
- 2 July Macerata
- 3 July Senigallia
- 4 July Ferrara
- 5 July Recoaro; 1/2 finale
- 6 July Recoaro; finale
- 14 July - Le Havre
- 30 August - Palerme
- 9 November - Creil
- 16 November - Potigny
- 23 November - Zurich (Switzerland)

=== 1969 ===
- 9 to 11 January - Gala en Italie; Milan, ...
- January - Cannes; Midem
- 22 February - Deux Alpes
- 23 February - Saint-Etienne
- 7 March - Rome (Palazzo dello sport)
- 12 to 14 March - Berlin
- 25 et 26 March - Belgrade
- 15 to 27 April - Tour France
- April - Sénégal
- 25 May - Rémérangles; Grande nuit des fleurs
- 15 to 31 July - Tour Italie
- 1er August - La Gacilly
- 3 August - Brioude
- 5 August - Selestat
- 6 August - Evian
- 8 August -Saint-Flour
- 9 August - Saint-Cyr
- 11 et 12 August - Athènes
- 13 August - Nice
- 14 August - Fréjus
- 16 August - Knokke le zoute
- 17 August - Boulogne sur mer
- 20 August - Dax
- 23 August - Château Boussac
- 25 August - Porto Polo
- 26 August - Juan les Pins
- 27 August - Monte-Carlo
- 29 August - Bastelica
- 31 August - Libourne
- 1er September - Escoubes
- 4 September - Cassis
- 6 September - Peyrecave
- 7 September - Castelnau Medo
- 12 to 14 September - Salonique
- 15 et 16 September - Belgrade
- 20 September - Gala des étoiles
- October - Valence
- 18 to 22 December - Gala to Gabon

== 1970s ==
=== 1970 ===
- January - Papeete
- 7 to 11 February - Tour Italie
- 14 to 20 February - Téhéran
- 3 May - Paris (Pleyel)
- 8 to 15 July - Gala en Grèce
- September - Grèce (Miss univers)
- 23 November - Lugano (Switzerland)
- Ostende
- Genève, Hôtel intercontinental (Switzerland)

=== 1971 ===
- January - Belgrade; Gala de clôture at International film festival of Belgrade + 2 concerts
- March - Brasov, Romania ("Golden Stag Festival")
- 17 October - Marlenheim
- 30 October - La Côte Saint-André
- 31 October - Auxerre
- 1er November - Clermont-Ferrand
- 3 November - Aurillac
- 4 November - Mazamet
- 5 November - Cahors
- 6 November - Angoulème
- 7 November - Tours
- 22 November to 5 December - Paris (Olympia)
- Beyrouth

=== 1972 ===
- 24 June - Eaubonne
- 1er July - Spa
- 2 July - Yvoy le Marron
- 14 July - Cot Chiavari
- 16 July - Maubeuge
- 23 July - Luzinian
- 26 July - Fréjus
- 27 July - Nice
- 11 December - Orléans
- 22 December - Charenton
- 23 December - Château Thierry

=== 1973 ===
- 6 et 7 January - Beyrouth
- 13 January - Paris (Mutualité)
- 20 January - La Celle Saint-Cloud
- 7 du 15 February, sauf 9 et 11 - Japon
- 3 March - Paris (Mutualité)
- 27 April - Saint-Louis
- 5 May - Genissiat par Bellegarde
- 19 May - Nîmes
- 26 May - Montville
- 3 June - L'Aigle
- 10 June - Levier
- 16 June - Malakoff
- 24 June - Pithiviers
- 28 June - Vincennes (Cirque J. Richard); fête des républicains indépendants
- 1er July - Serifontaine
- 14 July - Maubeuge
- 14 July - Hénin
- 21 July - Vedene
- 15 November - Madrid
- 24 November - Thônex
- 4 to 9 December - Beyrouth

=== 1974 ===
- 15 January - Paris (Olympia)
- 6 August - Narbonne
- 7 to 15 February - Japon
- 1 May - Compiègne
- 4 May - Toulouse
- May - Genève (Switzerland)
- 9 July to 17 August - podium Sud radio
- 12 July - Foix
- 10 November - Zedelgem
- Caen
- Besançon

=== 1975 ===
- 13 January - Paris (Olympia); Musicorama
- 8 March - Dortmund
- 20 March - La rochelle
- 26 March - Hambourg
- 6 April - Canada
- 18 May - Nîmes
- 8 June - Briançon
- 17 June - Troyes
- 26 July - Tunisie
- July - Mont-de-Marsan
- 14 to 19 October - Canada (Place des arts)
- 20 October - Victoriaville
- 21 to 25 October - Québec
- 26 October - Shawinigan
- Saint-Jean
- Trois-Rivières
- 6 November - Verdun
- Caen
- Dax

=== 1976 ===
- 23 April - Chalais (Switzerland)
- 2 December - Epinal
- 3 December - Nancy
- 4 December - Troyes
- 6 December - Reims
- 7 December - Lille
- 8 December - Halluin
- 9 December - Abbeville
- 10 December - Douai
- 11 December - Evreux
- 14 December - Toulouse
- 15 December - Albi
- 16 December - Pamiers
- 17 December - La grande motte

=== 1977 ===
- 4 to 26 January - Paris (Olympia)
- 10 to 13 February - Montréal (Salle Wilfrid-Pelletier)
- 14 February - Province
- 15 to 20 February - Québec
- 21 to 23 February - Province
- 24 to 27 February - Montréal (Salle Wilfrid-Pelletier)
- 15 April - Garches
- June - Beaunes
- July - Tour in Middle East
- 23 July - Marseille
- 24 July - Maubeuge
- 10 September - Cambrai
- 7 October - Bruxelles
- 17 et 18 December - Prague
- 20 December - Kosice

=== 1978 ===
- 14 January - Bruxelles
- 11 February - Rouen (Théâtre des arts)
- 25 February - Puisieux
- 3 March - Tubize
- 4 March - Amiens
- 25 March - Saint-étienne
- 26 March - Château Meillan; matinée
- 15 April ... - Tour in Middle East
- April - Istanbul
- April - Izmir
- 17 et 18 April - Jordanie
- 30 April - Valence; matinée
- 13 May - Knokke le Zoute
- 14 May - Blet; matinée
- 27 May - Aclens (Switzerland)
- 3 June - Troyes
- 9 June - Nivelles
- 17 June - Niederbronn
- 24 June - Longwy
- 25 July - Cannes (Casino d'hiver); Private gala Kashoggi
- 29 September - Delémont (Switzerland)
- 30 September - Annecy
- 2 October - Agen
- 3 October - Saint-Julien en Genêvois
- 7 October - Bruxelles (Forest National)
- 15 November to 17 December - Canada
- 29 November - New-York
- Ankara

=== 1979 ===
- 22 January to 5 February - Indian Ocean; Iles Maurice, Madagascar, Réunion, Seychelles
- 14 to 27 February - South America; Brésil, Argentine, Mexique
- 2 to 8 March - Espagne; Madrid, Barcelone, Valence, Séville, Malaga, Bilbao
- 10 to 23 March - Tour Afrique noir
- 29 March - Evreux
- 31 March - Nogent sur Marne
- 8 April - Reunion of Dalida fan club
- 15 April - Clermont-Ferrand
- 19 May - Marseille
- 20 May - Allones
- 24 May - Cravant les Côteaux
- 31 May to 3 June - Le Caire
- 24 June - Lésignan
- 29 June - Monte Carlo (Sporting-Club)
- 30 June - Marseille
- 1er July - Draguignan
- 7 July - Marignane
- 9 July - Toulouse
- 14 July - Ostende
- 23 July - Saint-Vincent de Tyrosse
- 28 July - Knokke le Zoute
- 2 September - Lavaur
- 3 September - Cavaillon
- 7 to 14 September - Liban
- 16 to 19 September - Liban
- 18 October - Montpellier

== 1980s ==
=== 1980 ===
- 5 to 20 January - Paris (Palais des sports)
- 21 March - Saint-étienne
- 23 April - Genève, Patinoire des Vernets (Switzerland)
- June - Athènes (Stade Coubertin)
- 11 July - Maubeuge
- 18 July - Daglan
- 30 July - Ajaccio (Stade Coty)
- 4 August - Mimizan
- 8 August - Sète
- 9 August - La Grande-motte
- 11 August - Colmar
- 11 August - Cannes
- 13 August - Alès
- 14 August - Gemenos
- 15 August - Barcelonnette
- 16 August - Canet-plage
- 18 August - Cannes
- 19 August - Nice
- 6 September - Moutier, patinoire (Switzerland)
- Saint-Jean-De-Luz

=== 1981 ===
- 31 January - El Menzah (Palais des sports)
- 18 March to 19 April, sauf 25 et 30 March, 6 April - Paris (Olympia)
- 21 April - Lille
- 7 to 10 May - Abu Dhabi
- 6 June - Knokke-le-Zoute
- 8 August - Périgueux
- 16 October - Paris (Esplanade Palais de Chaillot)
- 17 October - Paris (Trocadéro)

=== 1982 ===
- 21 July - Maubeuge
- December - Istres
- Allemagne; Munich, Dusseldorf, Berlin

=== 1983 ===
- 11 February - Varsovie; 2 représentations
- 12 et 13 February - Katowice; 4 représentations
- 9 October - Vincennes (Force ouvrière)
- 10 November - Alger
- Le Caire

=== 1984 ===
- 24 March - Bruxelles
- 25 February - Belgique
- 16 et 17 April - Montréal
- 18 et 19 April - Québec
- 20 April - Ottawa
- 24 to 29 April - Etats-Unis, Broadway, New-York, Los-Angeles
- 18 May - Marseille
- May 1984 - Reims, Provins
- 24 May - Beauvais
- 6 June - Belley
- 7 June - Albertville
- 8 June - Annecy
- 9 June - Annemasse
- 11 June - Oyonnax
- 12 June - Lons-le-saulnier
- 13 June - Dôle
- 14 June - Besançon
- 15 June - Vesoul
- 16 June - Epinal
- 21 July - Aix-les-thermes
- 22 July - Trie sur braise
- 23 July - Luchon
- 24 July - Bagneres-de-bigorre
- 25 July - Argelest-gazost
- 26 July - Cazaubon barbotan
- 27 July - Valence d'agen
- 28 July - Aurignac
- 29 July - Fumel
- 30 July - Aiguillon
- 31 July - Agen
- 2 August - Barcarès
- 3 August - Cap d'Agde
- 4 August - Narbonne plage
- 5 August - Canet plage
- 6 August - Argelès-sur-Mer
- 7 August - Canet Brasilia
- 8 August - Valras
- 9 August - Coursan
- 10 August - Gruissan
- 11 August - Saint-Cyprien
- 12 August - Grau d'Agde
- 13 August - Limoux
- 14 August - Béziers
- 15 aout - Auch
- 16 August - Toulouse
- 1er September - Ostende

=== 1985 ===
- February -İstanbul -Yıldız Palace (Silahtar mansion)
- 9 March - Paris - Reunion of Dalida fan club
- 8 May 1985 - Munich (Deutsches theater)
- 9 May - Düsseldorf (Schuhmann saal)
- 10 May 1985 - Berlin (Philharmonie)
- 12 May - Stuttgart (Liederhalle)
- 13 May - Berne, Kursaal (Switzerland)
- 14 May - Zurich, Bernhard Theater (Switzerland)
- 15 May - Genève, Grand Casino (Switzerland)
- 13 July - Knokke le zoute
- July - Hyères

=== 1986 ===
- Le Caire
- July - Seychelles, 2 concerts
- 24 et 25 October - Los Angeles (Shrine auditorium)
- Londres

=== 1987 ===
- 5 April - Paris - Reunion of Dalida fan club
- 29 April 1987 - Antalya
