= Io ti amo =

- Directed by: Antonio Margheriti
- Screenplay by: Renato Polselli, Antonio Margheriti
- Produced by: Luigi Rotundo
- Cinematography: Riccardo Pallottini
- Edited by: Tommasina Tedeschi
- Music by: Carlo Savina
- Production company: Genesio Productions
- Distributed by: Titanus
- Release date: 1967
- Running time: 96 minutes
- Country: Italy
- Language: Italian

Io ti amo is a 1968 Italian "musicarello" romantic thriller film directed by Antonio Margheriti and starring Dalida, Alberto Lupo, and Marisa Quattrini.
