= Palais des Sports 80 =

Live album by Dalida
- Released: 1980
- Recorded: 1980
- Genres: Live; world music; pop; disco; adult contemporary
- Labels: Orlando International Shows; Carrere

Dalida live albums chronology
Olympia 77 (1980)	Palais des Sports 80 (1980)	Olympia 59 (1981)

Palais des Sports 80 is a live double album by Dalida, recorded live at the Palais des Sports in Paris in January 1980.

== Track listing ==
=== Disc one ===
1. "Intro: In the Stone"
2. "Je suis toutes les femmes"
3. "Pour ne pas vivre seul"
4. "Le Lambeth Walk"
5. "Comme disait Mistinguett"
6. "Alabama Song" (English version)
7. "La Vie en rose"
8. "Quand on n'a que l'amour"
9. "Il faut danser reggae"
10. "Gigi l'amoroso"
11. "Gigi in Paradisco"

=== Disc two ===
1. "Mon Frère le soleil"
2. "Avec le temps"
3. "Salma ya salama" (Egyptian version)
4. "Monday, Tuesday... Laissez-moi danser"
5. "Money, Money" (English version)
6. "Il venait d'avoir 18 ans"
7. "Je suis malade"
8. "Ça me fait rêver"

== See also ==
- List of Dalida songs
- Dalida albums discography
- Dalida singles discography
