= Olympia 74 =

Live album by Dalida
- Released: 1974
- Recorded: 1974
- Genres: Live; world music; pop; adult contemporary
- Labels: Orlando International Shows; Sonopresse

Dalida chronology
Julien (1973)	Olympia 74 (1974)	Manuel (1974)

Olympia 74 is an album of songs by Dalida recorded live at the Olympia in Paris and released in 1974.

== Track listing ==
1. "Entrez sans frapper"
2. "Pour ne pas vivre seul"
3. "Nous sommes tous morts à 20 ans"
4. "Que sont devenues les fleurs ?"
5. "Ô Seigneur Dieu"
6. "Il venait d'avoir 18 ans"
7. "Avec le temps"
8. "Je suis malade"
9. "Gigi l'amoroso"

== See also ==
- List of Dalida songs
- Dalida albums discography
- Dalida singles discography
