= Coup de chapeau au passé =

Studio album by Dalida
- Released: 1976
- Recorded: 1972; 1975–1976
- Studio: Studio CBE
- Genres: World music; pop; disco; adult contemporary
- Labels: Orlando International Shows; Sonopresse
- Producer: Bruno Gigliotti

Dalida chronology
J'attendrai (1975)	Coup de chapeau au passé (1976)	Femme est la nuit (1977)

Coup de chapeau au passé is the 29th full-length release by French-Italian singer Dalida. It was released in 1976, and produced by her brother, Bruno "Orlando" Gigliotti.

== Track listing ==
1. "La Mer" (Charles Trenet)
2. "La Vie en rose" (Edith Piaf, Louiguy)
3. "Maman" (Bixio Cherubini, Cesare Bixio, Geo Koger)
4. "Parle-moi d'amour, mon amour (Le Chaland qui passe)" (Cesare Bixio, Claude Carmone, Pascal Sevran)
5. "Que reste-t-il de nos amours?" (Version 1972) (Trenet)
6. "Bésame mucho (Embrasse-moi)" (Consuelo Velázquez, Serge Lebrail, Sevran)
7. "Les Feuilles mortes" (Jacques Prévert, Joseph Kosma)
8. "J'attendrai" (Dino Olivieri, Louis Poterat, Nino Rastelli)
9. "Le Petit Bonheur" (Félix Leclerc)
10. "Amor Amor" (Amour c'est tout dire) (Sevran, Lebrail)
11. "Tico Tico" (Jacques LaRue, Zequinha Abreu)

=== Bonus (version 1980) ===
- "Tu m'as déclaré l'amour"

== Singles ==
- 1976 – "J'attendrai"
- 1976 – "Parle-moi d'amour, mon amour"
- 1976 – "Le Petit Bonheur"

== See also ==
- Dalida
- List of Dalida songs
- Dalida albums discography
- Dalida singles discography
