= J'attendrai (album) =

Studio album by Dalida
- Released: 1975
- Recorded: 1973–1975
- Studios: Studio Des Dames; Studio CBE
- Genres: World music; pop
- Labels: Orlando International Shows; Sonopresse
- Producer: Bruno Gigliotti

Dalida chronology
Manuel (1974)	J'attendrai (1975)	Coup de chapeau au passé (1976)

J'attendrai is the 31st studio album by Dalida, released in 1975.

== Track listing ==
1. J'attendrai
2. L'amour à la une
3. C'est mieux comme ça
4. Il venait d'avoir 18 ans
5. Et de l'amour... de l'amour
6. Ta femme
7. Ne lui dis pas
8. Raphaël
9. Mein lieber Herr
10. Gigi l'amoroso

== Singles ==
- 1975 Dalida & St-Germain: Et de l'amour... de l'amour
- 1975: Mein lieber Herr
- 1975: Ne lui dis pas
- 1976: J'attendrai

== See also ==
- Dalida
- List of Dalida songs
- Dalida albums discography
- Dalida singles discography
