= Dalida discography =

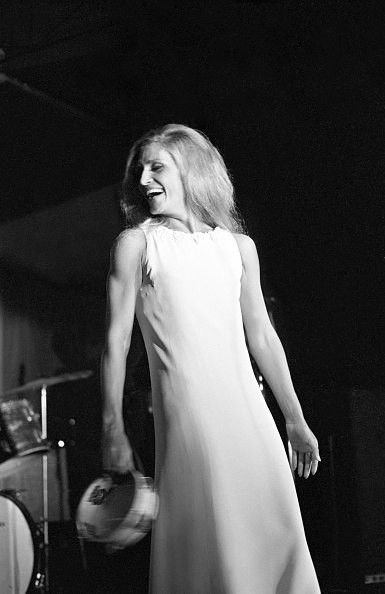
- Dalida in concert around 1970.
- Studio albums: 38
- Extended plays: 80
- Mainstream singles: 106
- Live albums: 4
- Promo singles: 200
- Compilation albums: 80
- Soundtrack album: 1
- Box sets: 4

French singer Dalida signed a recording contract with Barclay, a label owned by Eddie Barclay, in 1956. In late 1960s, her brother Orlando became her producer which resulted signing recording contract with Orlando Productions in 1970. Under those two recording houses, she recorded up to 700 songs in 9 different languages and in her name was released more than 500 different records in various audio formats, accumulatively during and after her life.

This list contains solely the releases issued during Dalida's life. Her albums, singles and EPs are listed below and organised by type and chronology. The titles are taken from the covers, or title songs, or if the title of one song is larger than the others. Some albums are commonly named. In other countries Dalida has released the same records whose cover art was frequently different, and sometimes the tracks names were translated to languages of countries of release. Those records are not specifically highlighted as they are merely variations of the ones that are listed.

== Albums ==
=== Studio albums ===
Full list
Year	Title	Catalog number	Track listing		Countries of release and sales	
Year	Title	Catalog number	Side A	Side B	Countries of release and sales	
1957	Son nom est Dalida	80 055	Bambino; Fado; Aime-moi; Flamenco bleu; Le torrent	Madona; Guitare flamenco; Gitane; Mon cœur va; La violetera	Australia; France; South Africa; UK; USA	FR: 92 641
1957	Miguel	80 063	Miguel; La plus belle du monde; Ay! mourir pour toi; Le petit chemin de pierre	Le ranch de Maria; Quand on n'a que l'amour; Tu n'as pas très bon caractère; Tu peux tout faire de moi	Belgium; France	FR: 92 641
1958	Gondolier	80 088	Gondolier; Histoire d'un amour; Calypso italiano; Pour garder; Lazzarella	Buenas noches mi amor; J'écoute chanter la brise; Le jour où la pluie viendra; Pardon; Oh! la la	France; Spain	FR: 92 641
1958	Les Gitans	80 094	Les Gitans; Aïe! mon cœur; Inconnu mon amour; Adieu monsieur mon amour; Rendez-vous au Lavandou	Dans le bleu du ciel bleu; Je pars; Timide sérénade; Marchande de fruits; Dieu seul	France	FR: 92 641
1959	Le disque d'or de Dalida	80 106	Ciao ciao bambina; Ce serait dommage; Si je pouvais revivre un jour ma vie; Du moment qu'on s'aime; Tu m'étais destiné	Come prima; Hava naguila; Tout l'amour; Guitare et tambourin; Amstramgram	Belgium; Canada; France; Italy; Spain	N/N
1959	Love in Portofino (album)	80 115	Love in Portofino; C'est ça l'amore; Adonis; Pilou pilou pilou hé; Marina	Ne joue pas; Luna caprese; J'ai rêvé; La chanson d'Orphée; Elle, lui et l'autre	Belgium; France; Italy	N/N
1960	Les enfants du Pirée	80 125	Les enfants du Pirée; T'aimer follement; Dans les rues de Bahia; De Grenade à Séville; Le petit clair de lune	Romantica; Vieni vieni si...; Le bonheur; S'endormir comme d'habitude; L'arlequin de Tolède	Belgium; France; Venezuela	N/N
1960	Milord	5018	Milord; Scoubidou; Gli zingari; T'amero dolcemente; L'arlecchino gitano; L'acqua viva	Uno a te, uno a me; Pezzetinni di bikini; Love in Portofino; O sole mio; La canzone d'Orféo; Il venditore di félicita	Italy	N/N
1960	Elle, lui et l'autre....	CBLP 2000	Elle, lui et l'autre; T'aimer follement; Dans les rues de Bahia; Tintarella de luna; L'arlequin De Tolède; Romantica	Itsi bitsi, petit bikini; Comme au premier jour; Ni chaud, ni froid; O sole mio; Bras dessus, bras dessous; Les enfants du Pirée	Canada	N/N
1961	Dalida internationale	80 144	Garde-moi la dernière danse; Dix mille bulles bleues; Parlez-moi d'amour; Je me sens vivre; ltsi bitsi, petit bikini	Pépé; La joie d'aimer; 24 mille baisers; O sole mio; Les marrons chauds	Belgium; France	N/N
1961	Rendezvous mit Dalida	35 655	Am Tag als der Regen kam; Orfeo; Melodie aus alter Zeit; Äpfel und Birnen; Buenas noches mi amor	Romantica; Milord; Glaub an mich; So verrück; Tschau tschau Bambina	Italy	N/N
1961	Loin de moi	80 165	Loin de moi; Plus loin que la terre; Comme une symphonie; Avec une poignée de terre; Nuits d'Espagne	Cordoba; Tu ne sais pas; Reste encore avec moi; Tu peux le prendre; Protégez-moi Seigneur	Belgium; France	N/N
1962	Le petit Gonzales	80 183	Le petit Gonzales; Je l'attends; Petit éléphant twist; Toutes les nuits; T'aimerai toujours	La leçon de Twist; A ma chance; Que sont devenues les fleurs?; Je ne peux pas me passer de toi; Achète-moi un juke-box	Belgium; Canada; France	N/N
1963	Eux	80 210	Eux; Quand revient l'été; Que la vie était jolie; Ah! quelle merveille	Sois heureux; Le jour du retour; Loop de loop; Chez moi	Argentina; Brazil; France; Israel; Spain	N/N
1964	Amore scusami	80 250	Amore scusami; La valse des vacances; Allô... tu m'entends ?; Je n'ai jamais pu t'oublier	Chaque instant de chaque jour; Je t'aime; A chacun sa chance; Ne lis pas cette lettre	Belgium; France	N/N
1965	Il silenzio	80 285	Il silenzio; Tu me voles; Son chapeau; La vie en rose; Toi pardonne-moi; Le flamenco	Scandale dans la famille; Le soleil et la montagne; C'est irréparable; Un enfant; Je ne dirai ni oui ni non; La danse de Zorba	Belgium; Canada; Chile; Czechoslovakia; France; Israel; Mexico; Peru; UK	N/N
1966	Pensiamoci ogni sera	BL 9035	Pensiamoci ogni sera; La danza di Zorba; Devo imparare; Il sole muore; El Cordobes; Ascoltami	Il silenzio; Flamenco; Va da lei; Questo amore é per sempre; Toi pardonne-moi; Un grosso scandalo	Italy	N/N
1967	Piccolo ragazzo	SIB 30	Piccolo ragazzo; Amo; Bang bang; Stivaletti rossi; Sola piu che mai; Mama	Cuore matto; Il mio male sei; Ciao amore, ciao; Pensiamoci ogni sera; Cominciamo ad amarci; Il silenzio	Italy	N/N
1967	Olympia 67	80 349	À qui?; Loin dans le temps; J'ai décidé de vivre; Mama; La chanson de Yohann; Petit homme	Je reviens te chercher; Entrez sans frapper; Les grilles de ma maison; Ciao amore, ciao; Toi mon amour; La banda	Argentina; Belgium; Brazil; Canada; Chile; France; Greece; Israel; South Africa; Venezuela	N/N
1968	Un po' d'amore	BSP 9045	Un po' d'amore; Son tornata da te; Aranjuez la tua voce; Entrate amici miei; Mama	L'aquilone; Amo l'amore; Dan dan dan; L'ora dell'amore; Amare per vivere; L'ultilmo valzer	Italy	N/N
1968	Le temps des fleurs	80 378	Le temps des fleurs; Quelques larmes de pluie; Manuella; Dans la ville endormie; Le septième jour; La bambola	Les anges noirs; Je m'endors dans tes bras; Tire l'aiguille; Le petit perroquet; Je me repose; Tzigane	Belgium; Canada; France; Germany; Greece; Mexico	N/N
1969	Ma mère me disait	80 410	Ma mère me disait; Deux colombes; Les violons de mon pays; L'anniversaire; La vie en rose; Le vent n'a pas de mémoire; Nake-di, nake-dou	Les couleurs de l'amour; L'an 2005; La ballade à temps perdu; Le sable de l'amour; Pars; Zoum zoum zoum	Belgium; Canada; France	N/N
1970	Ils ont changé ma chanson	39 701	Ils ont changé ma chanson; Si c'était à refaire; Mon frère le soleil; Les jardins de Marmara; Diable de temps; Darla dirladada	Lady d'Arbanville; Pour qui pour quoi; Entre les lignes entre les mots; Une jeunesse; Ram dam dam	Belgium; Canada; France; Italy; Netherlands	N/N
1971	Une vie	39 702	Une vie; Chanter les voix; Non; Toutes les femmes du monde; Mamy blue; Jesus bambino	Avec le temps; Les choses de l'amour; Le fermier; Monsieur l'amour; Tout au plus; Comment faire pour oublier	Argentina; Belgium; France; Netherlands	N/N
1972	Il faut du temps	39 704	Parle plus bas; L'amour qui venait du froid; Et puis c'est toi; Il faut du temps; Ma mélo mélodie	Pour ne pas vivre seul; Que reste-t-il de nos amours; Mamina; Avec le temps; Jesus kitsch	Belgium; France; Greece	N/N
1973	Julien	39 706	Julien; Ô Seigneur Dieu pourquoi m'as tu abandonné?; Je suis malade; Vado via; Paroles... paroles...	Non, ce n'est pas pour moi; Il venait d'avoir 18 ans; Soleil d'un nouveau monde; Mais il y a l'accordéon; Le temps de mon père; Rien qu'un homme de plus	Belgium; France; Lebanon	N/N
1974	Manuel	39 710	Manuel; Seule avec moi; Justine; Ta femme; Nous sommes tous morts à 20 ans; Anima mia	Ma vie je la chante; La consultation; Comme tu dois avoir froid; Des gens qu'on aimerait connaître; Gigi l'amoroso	Canada; France	N/N
1975	J'attendrai	39 713	J'attendrai; L'amour la une; C'est mieux comme ça; Il venait d'avoir 18 ans; Et de I'Amour... de l'amour	Ta femme; Ne lui dis pas; Raphaël; Mein lieber herr; Gigi l'amoroso	Canada; France; Germany; Greece; Japan; Netherlands; Portugal; Turkey	N/N
1976	Coup de chapeau au passé	39 714	La mer; La vie en rose; Parle-moi d'amour, mon amour; Maman; Que reste-t-il de nos amours	Bésame Mucho; Les feuilles mortes; J'attendrai; Le petit bonheur; Amor, amor; Tico Tico	Brazil; Canada; France; Germany; Greece; Japan; Netherlands; Portugal; Spain; Turkey	N/N
1977	Femme est la nuit	39 715	Femme est la nuit; Comme si tu revenais d'un long voyage; Il y a toujours une chanson; Les clefs de l'amour; Captain Sky	Amoureuse de la vie; Tables séparées; Comme si tu étais là; Voyages sans bagages; Et tous ces regards	Canada; France; Japan; Spain	N/N
1977	Salma ya salama	39 719	Salma ya salama; Notre façon de vivre; Histoire d'aimer; Tu m'as déclaré l'amour; Mon frère le soleil	Quand s'arrêtent les violons; Ti amo; A chaque fois j'y crois; Remember... c'était loin; Salma ya salama	Canada; France; Germany; Greece; Turkey	N/N
1979	Dédié à toi	67 359	Dédié à toi; Vedrai, vedrai; The Lambeth walk; Quand on n'a que l'amour; Helwa ya baladi	Monday Tuesday... Laissez-moi danser; Va va va; Problemorama; Depuis qu'il vient chez nous; Comme disait Mistinguett	Canada; France; Germany; Greece; South Korea; Turkey	N/N
1980	Gigi in Paradisco	67 439	Gigi in paradisco; Comme disait Mistinguett	Alabama song; Il faut danser reggae; Money, money; Je suis toutes les femmes	Canada; France; Germany; Greece; Turkey	N/N
1981	Olympia 81	67 674	Une femme à quarante ans; Il pleut sur Bruxelles; L'amour et moi; Le slow de ma vie; Marjolaine; Fini, la comédie	Et la vie continuera; La féria; J'm'appelle amnésie; Partir ou mourir; Chanteur des années 80; A ma manière	Canada; France; Greece; Turkey	N/N
1982	Special Dalida	67 846	Si la France; Jouez Bouzouki; Ensemble; Quand je n'aime plus, je m'en vais; Comment l'oublier; Le jour où la pluie viendra	Danza; Nostalgie; Pour vous; J'aurais voulu danser; Pour toi Louis; Bye bye	Canada; France; Germany; Greece	N/N
1983	Les p'tits mots	67 983	Les p'tits mots; Lucas; Téléphonez-moi; Marie Madeleine; Bravo	Mourir sur scène; Le restaurant italien; J'aime; S'aimer; Le premier amour du monde	Canada; France	N/N
1984	Dali	66 215	Pour te dire je t'aime; Là où je t'aime; Une vie d'homme; Toutes ces heures loin de toi; Kalimba de luna	La pensione bianca; C'était mon ami; Pour en arriver là; Mon Italie; Soleil	Canada; France	N/N
1986	Le visage de l'amour	66 318	Parce que je ne t'aime plus; La danse de Zorba; Le visage de l'amour; Le Vénitien de Levallois; Mama Caraïbo	Les hommes de ma vie; Salut salaud; Semplicemente cosi; Le temps d'aimer; Mourir sur scène	Canada; France	N/N
"N/N" denotes sales that are currently unknown.

=== Live albums ===
Full list
Year	Title	Catalog number	Track listing		Countries of release and sales	
Year	Title	Catalog number	Side A	Side B	Countries of release and sales	
1972	Olympia 71	39 703	Intro; Non; Chanter les voix; Hene ma tov; Tout au plus; Toutes les femmes du monde	Les choses de l'amour; Ils ont changé ma chanson; Une vie; Avec le temps; Ciao amore, ciao	France	N/N
1974	Olympia 74	39 707	Intro; Entrez sans frapper; Pour ne pas vivre seul; Nous sommes tous morts à 20 ans; Avec le temps; Que sont devenues les fleurs?; Ô Seigneur Dieu pourquoi m'as tu abandonné?	ll venait d'avoir 18 ans; Je suis malade; Julien; Gigi l'amoroso	France; Japan; Lebanon	N/N
1977	Olympia 77	39 716	Il y a toujours une chanson; Les clefs de l'amour; Le petit bonheur; Tables séparées; Comme si tu étais là; Et tous ces regards	Amoureuse de la vie; Medley; ll venait d'avoir 18 ans; Je suis malade; J'attendrai; Femme est la nuit	Canada; France; Turkey	N/N
1980	Dalida au Palais des Sports 1980	67 498	Disc 1:		France	N/N
1980	Dalida au Palais des Sports 1980	67 498	Intro; Je suis toutes les femmes; Le Lambeth Walk; Comme disait Mistinguett; Alabama song; La vie en rose; Quand on n'a que l'amour	Il faut danser reggae; Gigi l'amoroso; Gigi in paradisco	France	N/N
1980	Dalida au Palais des Sports 1980	67 498	Disc 2:		France	N/N
1980	Dalida au Palais des Sports 1980	67 498	Mon frère le soleil; Avec le temps; Salma ya salama; Monday Tuesday... Laissez-moi danser; Money, money	Il venait d'avoir 18 ans; Je suis malade; Ça me fait rêver	France	N/N
"N/N" denotes sales that are currently unknown.

=== Compilation albums ===
Full list
Year	Title	Catalog number	Track listing		Countries of release and sales	
Year	Title	Catalog number	Side A	Side B	Countries of release and sales	
1967	De "Bambino" à "Il silenzio"	80 312	Bambino; Gondolier; Les Gitans; Come prima; Love in Portofino; Ciao ciao bambina; T'aimer follement	Les enfants du Pirée; Romantica; Itsi bitsi, petit bikini; Garde-moi la dernière danse; Le jour le plus long; La danse de Zorba; Il silenzio	Belgium; Canada; France	N/N
1969	Canta in Italiano	80 396	Aranjuez la tua voce; Un po' d'amore; Dan dan dan; La speranza è una stanza; Sola più che mai; Zum, zum, zum	Casatchok; La promesse d'amore; Lacrime e pioggia; L'ultimo valzer; Amare per vivere; Quelli erano giorni	Belgium; Canada; France; Mexico; Venezuela	N/N
1969	In Deutsch	KMLP 316	Petruschka; An jenem Tag; Regenzeit-Tränenleid; Wenn die Soldaten; Weit über's Meer; Ciao amore, ciao	Am Tag als der Regen kam; El Cordobez; Mama; Nie; Ich werde warten; Abschiedsmelodie	Germany	N/N
1970	Collection recital, vol.1	920 246	Dans le bleu du ciel bleu; Le jour où la pluie viendra; Buenas noches mi amor; Tu n'as pas très bon caractère; Mélodie perdue; Je pars	Rendez-vous au Lavandou; Piccolissima serenata; Lazzarella; Calypso Italiano; Histoire d'un amour; Guitare et tambourin	Canada; France	N/N
1970	Collection recital, vol.2	920 247	Vieni vieni si...; L'arlequin de Tolede; Ce serait dommage; Je te tendrai les bras; Luna caprese; Ne joue pas	Le petit Gonzales; Chaque instant de chaque jour; Allô... tu m'entends ?; Le petit clair de lune; Manuel Benitez "El Cordobés"; Viva la pappa	Canada; France	N/N
1973	Dalida	80 913 80 914	Disc 1:		France; Germany	N/N
1973	Dalida	80 913 80 914	Repacked compilation album De "Bambino" à "Il silenzio".		France; Germany	N/N
1973	Dalida	80 913 80 914	Disc 2:		France; Germany	N/N
1973	Dalida	80 913 80 914	Repacked studio album Le temps des fleurs.		France; Germany	N/N
1973	The heart of France	39 705	Lei, lei; Credo nell'amore; Col tempo; Cammina, cammina; L'amore mio per te; Lady d'Arbanville	Solo un uomo in più; La colpa è tua; Mamy Blue; Per non vivere soli; Non è più la mia canzone; Prigioniera	France	N/N
1974	Double album Olympia	39 711 39 712	Live albums Olympia 71 and Olympia 74 repacked as double album.		Canada; France	N/N
1974	Les grands succès	VA 63 065	Parle plus bas; L'amour qui venait du froid; Et puis c'est toi; Il faut du temps; Ma mélo mélodie	Pour ne pas vivre seul; Que reste-t-il de nos amours; Mamina; Avec le temps; Jesus kitsch	Belgium; France; Greece	N/N
1974	Double album de luxe	39 708 39 709	Disc 1:		France	N/N
1974	Double album de luxe	39 708 39 709	Il venait d'avoir 18 ans; Mon frère le soleil; Je suis malade; Les choses de l'amour; La colpa è tua; Mais il y a l'accordéon	Parle plus bas; Pour ne pas vivre seul; Si c'était à refaire; Tout au plus; Non, ce n'est pas pour moi; Ma mélo mélodie	France	N/N
1974	Double album de luxe	39 708 39 709	Disc 2:		France	N/N
1974	Double album de luxe	39 708 39 709	Mamina; Pour qui pour quoi; Une vie; Mamy Blue; Il faut du temps; Paroles... paroles	Julien; Vado via; Que reste-t-il de nos amours; Ils ont changé ma chanson; Lady d'Arbanville; Darla dirladada	France	N/N
1975	Sempre più Dalida	77 777/17 001	Gigi l'amoroso; Tua moglie; C'è gente incontri per strada; La colpa é tua; Per non vivere soli	18 anni; Manuel; Giustina; Lei lei; Col tempo; Credo nell'amore/Tornerai	Italy	N/N
1975	Les grands succès	VA 63 077	Et de l'Amour... de l'Amour; Ta femme; Seule avec moi; Vado via; Manuel; Pour ne pas vivre seul	Anima mia; Il venait d'avoir 18 ans; La consultation; Mon petit bonhomme; Justine; Des gens qu'on amerait connaître	France	N/N
1975	Enregistrements originaux - Volume 1	6886 900	Paroles... paroles...; Ils ont changé ma chanson; Mamina; Ma mélo mélodie; Le temps de mon pere; Pour ne pas vivre seul	Il venait d'avoir 18 ans; L'amour qui venait du froid; Ta femme; Mamy Blue; Pour qui pour quoi; Darla dirladada	France	N/N
1975	Enregistrements originaux - Volume 2	6886 460	Zoum zoum zoum; La sainte Totoche; Ciao amore, ciao; Il silenzio; Le flamenco; Petit homme	Je reviens te chercher; Viva la pappa; La banda; Tant d'amours du printemps; Loin dans le temps; Chaque instant de chaque jour	France	N/N
1975	Enregistrements originaux - Volume 3	6886 461	Les enfants du Pirée; Chez moi; Quand revient l'été; Comme au premier jour; La leçon de Twist; Loop de loop	T'aimer toujours; Vieni vieni si...; C'est un jour a Naples; Le ciel bleu; Mon amour oublie; T'aimer follement	France	N/N
1975	Dalida	6995 900	Compilation albums Enregistrements originaux - Volume 2 and 3 repacked as double album.		France	N/N
1976	Les plus grands succès de Dalida	80 996 80 997	Compilation albums Collection recital, vol.1 and 2 repacked as double album.		France; Grece	N/N
1977	45ème disque d'or pour une super-star	39 717	Remember... c'était loin; J'attendrai; Il venait d'avoir 18 ans; Le petit bonheur; Paroles... paroles...; Parle plus bas	Besame mucho; Femme est la nuit; Anima mia; Captain Sky; Gigi l'amoroso	Canada; France	N/N
1977	Dalida	DA 35 545	Studio albums Julien and Une vie repacked as double album.		France	N/N
1977	Dalida	MFP 98 785	Parle plus bas; Voyage sans bagages; Lady d'Arbanville; Si c'etait à refaire; Mon frère le soleil; Une vie	Il venait d'avoir 18 ans; Non, ce n'est pas moi; Comme si tu revenais d'un long voyage; Les choses de l'amour; Manuel; Pour ne pas vivre seul	France	N/N
1978	Collection or vol.1	CO 1469	Ils ont changé ma chanson; Quand s'arrêtent les violons; Vadio via; Parle plus bas; Anima mia; Jesus bambino	Manuel; Et de l'Amour... de l'Amour; Mamy Blue; Ta femme; Tout au plus; La rose que j'aimais	France	N/N
1978	Collection or vol.2	CO 1474	Ne lui dis pas; Darla dirladada; Ma mélo mélodie; Histoire d'aimer; Mais il y a l'accordéon; Mein lieber herr	Captain Sky; Pour qui pour quoi; Julien; Les clefs de l'amour; C'est mieux comme ça; Comme si tu revenais d'un long voyage	France	N/N
1978	Et Dieu... créa Dalida	67 279	Disc 1:		France	N/N
1978	Et Dieu... créa Dalida	67 279	Salma ya salama; Amoureuse de la vie; Il venait d'avoir 18 ans; Paroles... paroles...; Pour ne pas vivre seul; Remember... c'était loin	Ti amo; Femme est la nuit; Les clefs de l'amour; Je suis malade; Gigi l'amoroso	France	N/N
1978	Et Dieu... créa Dalida	67 279	Disc 2:		France	N/N
1978	Et Dieu... créa Dalida	67 279	Repacked studio album Coup de chapeau au passé + "Tu m'as déclaré l'amour".		France	N/N
1979	Dalida	ALB 330	Compilation albums Collection or vol.1 and 2 repacked as double album.		France	N/N
1980	Été 80	67 536	Rio do Brasil; Anima mia; Il faut danser reggae; Remember... c'était loin; Monday Tuesday... Laissez-moi danser	Gigi in paradisco; Vado via; Génération 78; Helwa ya baladi; Comme disait Mistinguett	France; Saudi Arabia	N/N
1980	16 grands succès	200 363	Bambino; Come prima; Ciao ciao bambina; T'aimer follement; La danse de Zorba; Le temps des fleurs; L'arlequin de Tolède; Le petit Gonzalès	Les enfants du Pirée; Le jour où la pluie viendra; Rendez-vous au Lavandou; Madona; Maman, la plus belle du monde; Tu n'as pas très bon caractère; Hava naguila; Gondolier	France; South Korea	N/N
1980	Le disque d'or	90 341	Bambino; Gondolier; Dans le bleu du ciel bleu; Come prima; Ciao ciao bambina; Itsi bitsi, petit bikini	Le petit Gonzales; Que sont devenues les fleurs?; Allô... tu m'entends ?; Scandale dans la famille; Je reviens te chercher; Le temps des fleurs	Venezuela; France; Portugal; South Africa	N/N
1981	Disque d'or	67 839	Quand je n'aime plus, je m'en vais; Il pleut sur Bruxelles; Rio do Brasil; Comme disait Mistinguett; Monday Tuesday... Laissez-moi danser; Il faut danser reggae	Nostalgie; Americana; Chanteur des années 80; Fini, la comédie; Gigi in paradisco; Le Lambeth Walk	France	N/N
1981	16 Chansons 16 Succès	63 031	Monday Tuesday... Laissez-moi danser; Remember... c'était loin; Je suis toutes les femmes; Comme disait Mistinguett; Paroles... paroles...; Il faut danser reggae; Il venait d'avoir 18 ans; The Lambeth Walk	Gigi l'amoroso; Vedrai, vedrai; Problemorama; Alabama song; Ti amo; Rio do Brasil; Depuis qu'il vient chez nous; Salama ya salama	France	N/N
1982	La chanson du Mundial	67 891	La chanson du Mundial; Danza; Il pleut sur Bruxelles; Les clefs de l'amour; Depuis qu'il vient chez nous; Pour vous	Jouez bouzouki; Ensemble; Rio do Brasil; Tony; Pour toi Louis; Comme disait Mistinguett	France	N/N
1982	Mondialement vôtre	67 908	Confidences sur la fréquence; Si el amor se acaba me voy; Danza; The great Gigi l'amoroso	Aghani aghani; Pour un homme; Am Tag als der Regen kam; Jouez bouzouki	France; Greece	N/N
1983	Femme	66 059	Femme; Mourir sur scène; Téléphonez-moi; Confidences sur la fréquence	Ton prénom dans mon cœur; Les p'tits mots; Lucas; Le restaurant italien	France	N/N
1983	16 Chansons 16 Succès	63 077	Confidences sur la fréquence; Nostalgie; J'aurais voulu danser; Une femme à quarante ans; Jouez bouzouki; Si la France; Danza; Pour vous	Il pleut sur Bruxelles; Une vie; Ensemble; Parle plus bas; Julien; Americana; Tout au plus; Aba daba honeymoon	France	N/N
1986	Le sixième jour	66 397	Le sixième jour; Fini, la comédie; J'attendrai; Paroles... paroles...; Il venait d'avoir 18 ans; Salma ya salama	Pour te dire je t'aime; Ti amo; Kalimba de luna; Parle plus bas; Gigi l'amoroso	France	N/N
"N/N" denotes sales that are currently unknown.

=== Soundtrack albums ===
Full list
Year	Title	Catalog number	Track listing	Countries of release and sales	
1977	Dalida pour toujours	39 718	All extracts of various songs of Dalida that appeared in Dalida pour toujours documentary film.	France	N/N
"N/N" denotes sales that are currently unknown.

=== Box sets ===
Full list
Year	Title	Catalog number	Track listing		Countries of release and sales	
Year	Title	Catalog number	Side A	Side B	Countries of release and sales	
1975	Dalida	6993 081	Compilation albums Enregistrements originaux - Volume 1, 2 and 3 repacked in a 3 disc box set.		France	N/N
1977	Dalida vol.1	92 011 92012 92013 92014	Disc 1:		France	N/N
1977	Dalida vol.1	92 011 92012 92013 92014	Madona; Flamenco bleu; Le torrent; Gitane; Fado; Bambino; Aime-moi; Ay! mourir pour toi	Le petit chemin de pierre; Maman, la plus belle du monde; Le ranch de Maria; Tu peux tout faire de moi; Tu n'as pas très bon caractère; Buenas noches mi amor; Lazzarella; Histoire d'un amour	France	N/N
1977	Dalida vol.1	92 011 92012 92013 92014	Disc 2:		France	N/N
1977	Dalida vol.1	92 011 92012 92013 92014	Gondolier; Pardon; Dieu seul; Les yeux de mon amour; Maintenant; Dans le bleu du ciel bleu; La montagne; Je pars	Adieu monsieur mon amour; Timide sérénade; Aïe! mon cœur; Les Gitans; Mélodie perdue; Rendez-vous au Lavandou; Coure prima; Guitare et tambourin	France	N/N
1977	Dalida vol.1	92 011 92012 92013 92014	Disc 3:		France	N/N
1977	Dalida vol.1	92 011 92012 92013 92014	Du moment qu'on s'aime; Si je pouvais revivre un jour; Des millions de larmes; Hava naguila; Ciao ciao bambina; Ce serait dommage; La filles aux pieds nus; Je te tendrai les bras	La chanson d'Orphée; C'est ça l'amore; Mon amour oublié; Marie, Marie; J'ai rêvé; Ne joue pas; Luna caprese; Mélodie pour un amour	France	N/N
1977	Dalida vol.1	92 011 92012 92013 92014	Disc 4:		France	N/N
1977	Dalida vol.1	92 011 92012 92013 92014	De Grenade à Séville; T'aimer follement; Va petite étoile; Romantica (French version); Le petit clair de lune; L'arlequin de Tolède; Vieni vieni si...; S'endormir comme d'habitude	Comme au premier jour; Les enfants du Pirée; Le bonheur; Itsi bitsi, petit bikini; Bras dessus, bras dessous; Parlez-moi d'amour; Garde-moi la dernière danse; La joie d'aimer	France	N/N
1977	Dalida vol.2	92 015 92016 92017 92018	Disc 1:		France	N/N
1977	Dalida vol.2	92 015 92016 92017 92018	Disc 2:		France	N/N
1977	Dalida vol.2	92 015 92016 92017 92018	Disc 3:		France	N/N
1977	Dalida vol.2	92 015 92016 92017 92018	Disc 4:		France	N/N
1979	Cofferet Collection or	CCO 2717	Disc 1:		France	N/N
1979	Cofferet Collection or	CCO 2717	Repacked compilation album Collection or vol.1.		France	N/N
1979	Cofferet Collection or	CCO 2717	Disc 2:		France	N/N
1979	Cofferet Collection or	CCO 2717	Repacked compilation album Collection or vol.2.		France	N/N
1979	Cofferet Collection or	CCO 2717	Disc 3:		France	N/N
1979	Cofferet Collection or	CCO 2717	Repacked studio album Coup de chapeau au passé + "Tu m'as déclaré l'amour".		France	N/N
"N/N" denotes values that are currently unknown.

== Extended plays ==
Full list
Year	Catalog number	Track listing		Countries of release and sales	
Year	Catalog number	Side A	Side B	Countries of release and sales	
1956	70 034	Madona; Guitare flamenco	Flamenco bleu; Mon cœur va	France; Italy; Portugal	N/N
1956	70 039	La violetera; Le torrent	Gitane; Fado	France; Italy; Spain	N/N
1956	70 068	Bambino; Aime-moi	Eh! ben; Por favor	France; Portugal; Spain	N/N
1957	70 071	Miguel; Ay! mourir pour toi	La plus belle du monde; Le petit chemin de pierre	France; Italy	N/N
1957	70 079	Le ranch de Maria; Tu peux tout faire de moi	Quand on n'a que l'amour; Tu n'as pas très bon caractère	France; Netherlands; Spain	N/N
1957	70 094	Lazzarella; Buenas noches mi amor	Scusami; Oh! la la	France	N/N
1957	70 113	Histoire d'un amour; Calypso italiano	Pour garder; Tesoro mio	France; Denmark	N/N
1957	70 116	Gondolier; Le jour où la pluie viendra	J'écoute chanter la brise; Pardon	France; Italy; Spain	N/N
1958	70 158	Dans le bleu du ciel bleu; La montagne	Dieu seul; Les yeux de mon amour	FR: +250 000; Portugal	N/N
1958	70 165	Je pars; Timide sérénade	Inconnu mon amour; L'amour chante	France; Spain	N/N
1958	70 168	Aïe! mon cœur; Adieu monsieur mon amour	Héléna; Maintenant	France	N/N
1958	70 178	Les Gitans; Mélodie perdue	Marchande de fruits; Rendez-vous au Lavandou	France; Greece; Spain	N/N
1958	70 194	Come prima; Tu m'étais destiné	Piccolissima serenata; Si je pouvais revivre un jour ma vie	France	N/N
1959	70 202	Amstagram; Hava nagila	Guitare et tambourin; Des millions de larmes	France	N/N
1959	70 230	Ciao ciao bambina; Ce serait dommage	Tout l'amour; La fille aux pieds nus	France	N/N
1959	70 250	Tschau tschau Bambina; Melodie aus alter Zeit	Äpfel und Birnen; Am Tag als der Regen kam	France	N/N
1959	70 271	La chanson d'Orphée; Je te tendrai les bras	Mes frères; Love in Portofino	France; Belgium	N/N
1959	70 289	Ne joue pas; Marina	C'est ça l'amore; Marie, Marie	France; Spain	N/N
1959	70 290	Luna caprese; Adonis	J'ai rêvé; Mélodie pour un amour	France	N/N
1960	70 314	T'aimer follement; Mon amour oublié	Elle, lui et l'autre; Va petite étoile	France	N/N
1960	70 318	L'arlequin de Tolède; Comme au premier jour	S'endormir comme d'habitude; Vieni vieni si...	France; Spain	N/N
1960	70 322	Les enfants du Pirée; C'est un jour à Naples	Le bonheur; Pilou pilou pilou hé	France; Spain	N/N
1960	70 336	Romantica (French version); Le petit clair de lune	Dans les rues de Bahia; De Grenade à Séville	France; Belgium; Japan; Spain	N/N
1960	70 344	Ein Schiff wird kommen; Komm, Senorita, komm	Milord (German version); So verrückt	France	N/N
1960	70 345	Itsi bitsi, petit bikini; Bras dessus, bras dessous	O sole mio (Italian version); Ni chaud, ni froid	France; Belgium; Spain	N/N
1960	70 348	Petit Papa Noël; Vive le vent	Douce nuit, sainte nuit; Noël blanc	France	N/N
1961	70 360	Les marrons chauds; La joie d'aimer	Garde-moi la dernière danse; Ciao ciao mon amour	France; Belgium; Spain	N/N
1961	70 374	24 mila baci; Un uomo vivo	Non mi dire chi sei; Pozzanghere	France; Belgium; Venezuela	N/N
1961	70 375	Pépé; Dix mille bulles bleues	Vingt quatre mille baisers; Je me sens vivre	France	N/N
1961	70 386	Quand tu dors près de moi; Parlez-moi d'amour	Nuits d'Espagne; Reste encore avec moi	France; Belgium; Spain	N/N
1961	70 391	Protégez-moi Seigneur; Tu peux le prendre	Avec une poignée de terre; Comme une symphonie	France; Belgium; Spain	N/N
1961	70 406	Loin de moi; Plus loin que la terre	Tu ne sais pas; Cordoba	France; Spain	N/N
1962	70 431	Achète-moi un juke-box; La leçon de twist	T'aimerai toujours; Le ciel bleu	France; Spain	N/N
1962	70 446	Le petit Gonzalès; A ma chance	Je ne peux pas me passer de toi; Toi tu me plais	France; Belgium; Spain	N/N
1962	70 471	Je lattends; Que sont devenues les fleurs?	Le jour le plus long; Petit éléphant twist	France; Spain	N/N
1963	70 496	La partie de football; Le cha cha cha	Tu croiras; Bientôt	France; Belgium; Spain	N/N
1963	70 544	Chez moi; Quand revient l'été	Le jour du retour; Loop de loop	France; Spain; Uruguay	N/N
1963	70 583	Sois heureux; Ah! quelle merveille	Eux; Que la vie était jolie	France; Brazil; Portugal; Spain	N/N
1964	70 609	Ding ding; Papa achète-moi un mari	Ce coin de terre; Là, il a dit	France; Canada	N/N
1964	70 639	Ils sont partis; Tant d'amours du printemps	Je ne sais plus; Ne t'en fais pas pour ça	France	N/N
1964	70 671	Chaque instant de chaque jour; Ne lis pas cette lettre	Je t'aime; A chacun sa chance	France; Canada; Spain	N/N
1964	70 713	Amore scusami (French version); La valse de vacances	Je n'ai jamais pu t'oublier; Allô... tu m'entends?	France; Argentina; Czechoslovakia; Spain	N/N
1965	70 757	Cominciamo ad amarci; Viva la pappa	Devo imparare; Ascoltami	France; Spain; Venezuela	N/N
1965	70 770	La danse de Zorba; Tu n'as pas mérité	Tout se termine; Les nuits sans toi	France; Iran; Israel; South Africa; Spain; Uruguay	N/N
1965	70 775	Viva la pappa; Hene ma tov	Le printemps sur la colline; La Sainte Totoche	France; Israel; Spain	N/N
1965	70 853	Il silenzo (French version); Scandale dans la famille	Le flamenco; Je ne dirai ni oui ni non	France; Israel; Mexico; Portugal; South Africa; Spain	N/N
1966	70 941	Manuel Benitez "El Cordobés" (French version); Toi pardonne-moi	Et... et...; Je crois mon cœur	France; Brazil; Israel; Portugal; South Africa; Spain	N/N
1966	70 997	Je t'appelle encore; Modesty	Parlez-moi de lui; Baisse un peu la radio	France; Portugal; South Africa	N/N
1966	71 064	Petit homme; Je préfère naturellement	Un tendre amour; Dans ma chambre	France; Brazil; Czechoslovakia; South Africa; Spain	N/N
1967	71 109	Mama (French version); Ciao amore, ciao	Mon cœur est fou; Ne reviens pas mon amour	France; Brazil; Portugal; South Africa; Spain; Uruguay	N/N
1967	71 167	Pauvre cœur; La chanson de Yohann	Les grilles de ma maison; Les gens sont fous	France; South Africa; Spain	N/N
1967	71 192	Hava naguila; La chanson d'Orphée	Les enfants du Pirée; Le bonheur	France; Portugal; South Africa	N/N
1967		Je reviens te chercher; La banda	À qui?; Loin dans le temps	France; Portugal	N/N
1968	71 247	Si j'avais des millions; Tout le monde a sa chanson d'amour	Tzigane; Tout le monde sait	France; Brazil; South Africa	N/N
1968	71 286	Pars; La petite maison bleue	La bambola; Dans la ville endormie.	France	N/N
1968	71 296	Le temps des fleurs; Je me repose/Le petit perroquet	Je m'endors dans tes bras; Le septième jour	France; Mexico	N/N
1969	71 331	L'anniversaire; Sèche vite tes larmes	Zoum zoum zoum; Dis-moi des mots	France	N/N
1969	71 362	Les violons de mon pays; Le vent n'a pas de mémoire	Le sable de l'amour; Et pourtant j'ai froid	France	N/N
1969	71 391	L'an 2005; Nake-di, nake-dou	Ma mère me disait; Les anges noirs	France	N/N
1969	71 409	Le clan des Siciliens; Deux colombes	Les couleurs de l'amour; Ballade à temps perdu	France	N/N
1970	71 433	Concerto pour une voix; Avant de te connaître	Tipitipiti; Hey, love	France	N/N
1970	1201	Lady d'Arbanville; Entre les lignes entre les mots	Pour qui pour quoi; Si c'était à refaire	France	N/N
1978	67 250	Ça me fait rêver	Voilà pourquoi je chante; Génération 78	France; Brazil; Canada; Greece; Israel; Italy; Japan; Romania; Syria; Turkey	N/N
1982	8154	La chanson du Mundial; Visa pour la chance	Si la France; Jouez bouzouki	France	N/N
"N/N" denotes sales that are currently unknown.

== Singles ==
=== Mainstream ===
Full list
Year	Catalog number	Track listing		Countries of release and sales	
Year	Catalog number	Side A	Side B	Countries of release and sales	
1959	60 130	Guitare et tambourin	Rendez-vous au Lavandou	France	N/N
1959	60 163	Love in Portofino	La chanson d'Orphée	France	N/N
1959	60 185	Marina	Elle, lui et l'autre	France	N/N
1960	60 221	Les enfants du Pirée	Le bonheur	France	N/N
1965	60 595	Wenn die Soldaten	Ich werde warten	France	N/N
1966	60 671	Manuel Benitez "El Cordobés" (French version)	Et... et...	France	N/N
1966	60 710	Je t'appelle encore	Baisse un peu la radio	France	N/N
1967	60 866	La banda	Je reviens te chercher	France	N/N
1967	60 867	À qui?	Loin dans le temps	France	N/N
1968	60 901	Si j'avais des millions	Tout le monde sait	France	N/N
1968	60 907	Tzigane	Tout le monde a sa chanson d'amour	France	N/N
1968	60 938	Pars	Dans la ville endormie	France	N/N
1968	61 019	Les anges noirs	Quelques larmes de pluie	France	N/N
1969	61 056	Zoum zoum zoum	L'anniversaire	France	N/N
1969	61 097	Les violons de mon pays	Le sable de l'amour	France	N/N
1969	61 110	Petruschka	Weit über's meer	France	N/N
1969	61 154	L'an 2005	Les anges noirs/Quelques larmes de pluie	France	N/N
1969	61 157	Ma mère me disait	Nake-di nake-dou	France	N/N
1969	61 196	Le clan des Siciliens	Deux colombes	France	N/N
1970	61 270	Concerto pour une voix	Tipitipiti	France	N/N
1970	61 278	Hey, love	Avant de te connaître	France	N/N
1970	45 701	Darla dirladada (French version)	Diable de temps	France	N/N
1970	45 702	Ils ont changé ma chanson	Ram dam dam	France	N/N
1971	45 703	Comment faire pour oublier	La rose que j'aimais	France	N/N
1971	45 704	Jesus bambino	Tout au plus	France	N/N
1971	45 705	Mamy Blue	La colpa è tua	France	N/N
1971	45 706	Avec le temps	Monsieur l'amour	France	N/N
1971	61 437	Maman, la plus belle du monde	Mama (French version)	France	N/N
1971	62 073	Am Tag als der Regen kam	Petruschka	France	N/N
1972	45 707	Les choses de l'amour	Chanter les voix	France	N/N
1972	45 708	Les choses de l'amour	Mamina	France	N/N
1972	45 709	Jesus kitsch	Ma mélo mélodie	France	N/N
1972	45 710	Parle plus bas	Il faut du temps	France	N/N
1973	45 711	Paroles... paroles...	Pour ne pas vivre seul	France	N/N
1973	45 712	Mais il y a l'accordéon	Rien qu'un homme de plus	France	N/N
1973	45 713	Vado via	Je suis malade	France	N/N
1973	45 715	Julien	Non ce n'est pas pour moi	France	N/N
1974	45 716	Gigi l'amoroso (French version)	Il venait d'avoir 18 ans	France	N/N
1974	45 717	Anima mia	Ta femme	France	N/N
1974	45 718	Manuel (French version)	Des gens qu'on aimerait connaître	France	N/N
1975	45 719	Et de l'Amour... de l'Amour	Mon petit bonhomme	France	N/N
1975	45 721	Mein lieber Herr (French version)	Nous sommes tous morts à 20 ans	France	N/N
1975	45 722	Mein lieber Herr (French version)	C'est mieux comme ça	France	N/N
1975	45 723	Ne lui dis pas	Justine	France	N/N
1976	45 724	J'attendrai	L'amour à la une	France	N/N
1976	45 725	Besame mucho	Parle-moi d'amour, mon amour	France	N/N
1976	45 726	Le petit bonheur	Tu m'as déclaré l'amour	France	N/N
1977	45 727	Captain Sky (French version)	Les clefs de l'amour	France	N/N
1977	45 728	Femme est la nuit	Amoureuse de la vie	France	N/N
1977	620 333	Histoire d'aimer	Tables séparées	France	N/N
1977	45 729	Remember... c'était loin	Comme si tu revenais d'un long voyage	France	N/N
1977	45 730	Salma ya salama (French version)	Ti amo	France	N/N
1977	45 731	Salma ya salama (Arabic version)	Salma ya salama (instrumental)	France	N/N
1978	49 354	Salma ya salama (French version)	Ti amo	France	N/N
1978	49 357	Génération 78 (first part)	Génération 78 (second part)	France	N/N
1978	8016	Génération 78	Quand s'arrêtent les violons	France	N/N
1978	49 415	Ça me fait rêver (extract)	Voilà pourquoi je chante	France	N/N
1978	49 447	Le Lambeth Walk (French version)	Il y a toujours une chanson	France	N/N
1979	49 454	Helwa ya baladi	Helwa ya baladi (instrumental)	France	N/N
1979	49 468	Problemorama	Depuis qu'il vient chez nous	France	N/N
1979	49 514	Monday Tuesday... Laissez-moi danser	Comme toi	France	N/N
1979	8055	Monday Tuesday... Laissez-moi danser	Vedrai, vedrai	France	N/N
1979	49 546	Let me dance tonight	He must have been eighteen	France	N/N
1979	49 566	Il faut danser reggae	Comme disait Mistinguett	France	N/N
1980	49 599	Gigi in paradisco (extract)	Je suis toutes les femmes	France	N/N
1980	8083	Gigi in paradisco (first part)	Gigi in paradisco (second part)	France	N/N
1980	49 641	Rio do Brasil (extract)	Quand s'arrêtent les violons	France	N/N
1980	8088	Rio do Brasil (long version)	Rio do Brasil (instrumental)	France	N/N
1980	49 680	Chanteur des années 80	A ma manière	France	N/N
1981	49 720	Fini la comédie	Marjolaine	France	N/N
1981	49 761	Il pleut sur Bruxelles	Et la vie continuera	France	N/N
1981	49 811	Americana	Une femme à quarante ans	France	N/N
1981	49 842	Quand je n'aime plus je m'en vais	Nostalgie	France	N/N
1982	49 886	Danza	Tony	France	N/N
1982	49 892	Si la France	Jouez bouzouki	France	N/N
1982	49 920	La chanson du Mundial	Visa pour la chance (instrumental)	France	N/N
1982	50 023	Confidences sur la fréquence	Pour un homme	France	N/N
1983	13 176	Les p'tits mots	Mourir sur scène	France	N/N
1983	13 313	Femme	Le restaurant italien	France	N/N
1984	13 446	Soleil	L'innamorata	France	N/N
1984	13 550	Sarà sarà	Soleil	France	N/N
1984	13 604	Kalimba de luna (English version)	Kalimba de luna (French version)	France	N/N
1984	13 604	Pour te dire je t'aime	Kalimba de luna (French version)	France	N/N
1985	13 772	Reviens-moi	La pensione bianca	France	N/N
1985	8518	Reviens-moi	C'était mon ami	France	N/N
1985	13 887	Le temps d'aimer	Le Vénitien de Levallois	France	N/N
1986	14 057	Parce que je ne t'aime plus	Salut salaud	France	N/N
1986	14 126	Le sixième jour	Le sixième jour (instrumental)	France	N/N
"N/N" denotes sales that are currently unknown.

=== Promotional ===
Full list
Year	Catalog number	Track listing		Countries of release and sales	
Year	Catalog number	Side A	Side B	Countries of release and sales	
1956	60 046	Madona	Guitare flamenco	France	N/N
1956	60 047	Flamenco bleu	Mon cœur va	France	N/N
1956	60 054	La violetera	Gitane	France	N/N
1956	60 055	Le torrent	Fado	France	N/N
1956	60 061	Bambino	Aime-moi	France	N/N
1957	60 068	Ay! mourir pour toi	Le petit chemin de pierre	France	N/N
1957	60 072	Miguel	La plus belle du monde	France	N/N
1957	60 073	Le ranch de Maria	Tu peux tout faire de moi	France	N/N
1957	60 075	Tu n'as pas très bon caractère	Quand on n'a que l'amour	France	N/N
1957	60 080	Buenas noches mi amor	Scusami	France	N/N
1957	60 088	Lazzarella	Oh! la la	France	N/N
1957	60 090	Pour garder	Tesoro mio	France	N/N
1957	60 091	Calypso italiano	Histoire d'un amour	France	N/N
1957	58 001	Buenas noches mi amor	Lazzarella	France	N/N
1957	60 125	Piccolissima serenata	Si je pouvais revivre un jour ma vie	France	N/N
1958	60 092	Gondolier	Le jour où la pluie viendra	France	N/N
1958	60 093	J'écoute chanter la brise	Pardon	France	N/N
1958	60 102	Dieu seul	Les yeux de mon amour	France	N/N
1958	60 104	Dans le bleu du ciel bleu	La montagne	France	N/N
1958	60 106	Je pars	Héléna	France	N/N
1958	60 113	Aïe! mon cœur	Maintenant	France	N/N
1958	60 117	Timide sérénade	L'amour chante	France	N/N
1958	60 118	Les Gitans	Mélodie perdue	France	N/N
1958	60 122	Come prima	Tu m'étais destiné	France	N/N
1958	60 124	Inconnu mon amour	Adieu monsieur mon amour	France	N/N
1958	58 002	Gondolier	Le jour ou la pluie viendra	France	N/N
1958	58 003	Dans le bleu du ciel bleu	Dieu seul	France	N/N
1959	60 134	Amstramgram	Hava naguila	France	N/N
1959	60 139	Ciao ciao bambina	Ce serait dommage	France	N/N
1959	60 140	Tout l'amour	Des millions de larmes	France	N/N
1959	60 169	Mes frères	Je te tendrai les bras	France	N/N
1959	60 184	J'ai rêvé	C'est ça l'amore	France	N/N
1959	60 186	Ne joue pas	Adonis	France	N/N
1959	60 187	Luna caprese	Mon amour oublié	France	N/N
1959	60 189	Marie, Marie	Pilou pilou pilou hé	France	N/N
1960	60 191	L'Arlequin de Tolède	Comme au premier jour	France	N/N
1960	60 195	Vieni vieni si...	S'endormir comme d'habitude	France	N/N
1960	60 197	T'aimer follement	Va petite étoile	France	N/N
1960	60 207	Romantica (French version)	Dans les rues de Bahia	France	N/N
1960	60 208	De Grenade à Séville	Le petit clair de lune	France	N/N
1960	60 209	C'est un jour à Naples	Pourquoi	France	N/N
1960	60 235	Itsi bitsi, petit bikini	O sole mio (Italian version)	France	N/N
1960	60 236	Ni chaud ni froid	Bras dessus, bras dessous	France	N/N
1960	60 249	Noël blanc	Vive le vent	France	N/N
1961	60 255	Garde-moi la dernière danse	La joie d'aimer	France	N/N
1961	60 259	Ciao ciao mon amour	Les marrons chauds	France	N/N
1961	60 267	Dix mille bulles bleues	Parlez-moi d'amour	France	N/N
1961	60 269	Pépé	Vingt quatre mille baisers	France	N/N
1961	60 274	Quand tu dors près de moi	Nuits d'Espagne	France	N/N
1961	60 275	Reste encore avec moi	Je me sens vivre	France	N/N
1961	60 281	Avec une poignée de terre	Tu peux le prendre	France	N/N
1961	60 282	Protégez-moi Seigneur	Comme une symphonie	France	N/N
1961	60 291	Loin de moi	Tu ne sais pas	France	N/N
1961	60 292	Plus loin que la terre	Cordoba	France	N/N
1962	60 300	Si tu me téléphones	Achète-moi un juke-box	France	N/N
1962	60 306	T'aimerai toujours	La leçon de Twist	France	N/N
1962	60 311	T'aimerai toujours	Le ciel bleu	France	N/N
1962	60 319	Le petit Gonzalès	A ma chance	France	N/N
1962	60 320	Je ne peux pas me passer de toi	Toi tu me plais	France	N/N
1962	60 336	Je l'attends	Que sont devenues les fleurs?	France	N/N
1962	60 337	Le jour le plus long	Petit éléphant twist	France	N/N
1962	60 339	Mi carinito	Toutes les nuits	France	N/N
1963	60 355	Tu croiras	La partie de football	France	N/N
1963	60 363	Le cha cha cha	Bientôt (second version)	France	N/N
1963	60 379	Chez moi	Loop de loop	France	N/N
1963	60 385	Le jour du retour	Quand revient l'été	France	N/N
1963	60 403	Eux	Que la vie était jolie	France	N/N
1963	60 403	Sois heureux	Ah! quelle merveille	France	N/N
1964	60 443	Ding ding	Papa achète-moi un mari	France	N/N
1964	60 444	Ce coin de terre	Là, il a dit	France	N/N
1964	60 475	Ils sont partis	Tant d'amours du printemps	France	N/N
1964	60 476	Je ne sais plus	Ne t'en fais pas pour ça	France	N/N
1964	60 488	Ne lis pas cette lettre	Je t'aime	France	N/N
1964	60 489	Chaque instant de chaque jour	A chacun sa chance	France	N/N
1964	60 524	Amore scusami (French version)	Je n'ai jamais pu t'oublier	France	N/N
1965	60 541	Ascoltami	Devo imparare	France	N/N
1965	60 545	Cominciamo ad amarci	Viva la pappa	France	N/N
1965	60 555	Viva la pappa	Hene ma tov	France	N/N
1965	60 556	Le printemps sur la colline	La Sainte Totoche	France	N/N
1965	60 570	La danse de Zorba	Tu n'as pas mérité	France	N/N
1965	60 571	Tout se termine	Les nuits sans toi	France	N/N
1965	60 607	Il silenzio (French version)	Je ne dirai ni oui ni non	France	N/N
1965	60 615	Le flamenco	Scandale dans la famille	France	N/N
1965	60 658	Tu me voles	Son chapeau	France	N/N
1966	60 718	Parlez-moi de lui	Modesty Blaise	France	N/N
1966	60 738	Bang bang	Pensiamoci ogni sera	France	N/N
1966	60 749	Petit homme	Un tendre amour	France	N/N
1966	60 752	Dans ma chambre	Je préfère naturellement	France	N/N
1967	60 789	Mama (French version)	Ne reviens pas mon amour	France	N/N
1967	60 790	Ciao amore, ciao (French version)	Mon cœur est fou	France	N/N
1967	60 831	Les grilles de ma maison	Les gens sont fous	France	N/N
1967	60 832	Pauvre cœur	La chanson de Yohann	France	N/N
1968	60 949	La bambola	La petite maison bleue	France	N/N
1968	60 974	Le temps des fleurs	Je m'endors dans tes bras	France	N/N
1968	60 986	Le petit perroquet	Le septième jour	France	N/N
1968	61 028	Les anges noirs	Manuella	France	N/N
1969	61 043	L'anniversaire	Tire l'aiguille	France	N/N
1969	61 124	Et pourtant j'ai froid	Le vent n'a pas de mémoire	France	N/N
1969	61 224	Les couleurs de l'amour	Ballade à temps perdu	France	N/N
1970	20 502	Ils ont changé ma chanson	Ram dam dam	France	N/N
1970	20 503	Pour qui pour quoi	Lady d'Arbanville	France	N/N
1970	20 504	Entre les lignes entre les mots	Si c'était à refaire	France	N/N
1971	20 505	Comment faire pour oublier	La rose que j'aimais	France	N/N
1973	45 712	Mais il y a l'accordéon		France	N/N
1973	45 713	Vado via		France	N/N
1973	45 715	Julien		France	N/N
1973	20 506	Julien	Soleil d'un nouveau monde	France	N/N
1973	20 507	Il venait d'avoir 18 ans	Non ce n'est pas pour moi	France	N/N
1974	20 508	Gigi l'amoroso (short radio version)	Il venait d'avoir 18 ans	France	N/N
1976	20 534	J'attendrai	L'amour à la une	France	N/N
1977	45 728	Femme est la nuit	Amoureuse de la vie	France	N/N
1978	49 415	Ça me fait rêver (extract)	Voilà pourquoi je chante	France	N/N
1982	8189	Confidences sur la fréquence	Aghani aghani	France	N/N
1984	8436	Kalimba de luna (English version)	Kalimba de luna (French version)	France	N/N
1985	13 725	La pensione bianca	La pensione bianca	France	N/N
"N/N" denotes sales that are currently unknown.

== See also ==
- List of songs recorded by Dalida
