= List of Dalida music in motion pictures and TV =

Dalida was a French singer, actress, dancer and record producer. Her songs have often appeared as soundtrack in movies and TV series, sometimes her originals, and sometimes covers.

The following Dalida songs have appeared in the formentioned motion pictures or TV series during and after her life:

Year	Motion picture	Songs	Director	Ref
1959	Girls for the Mambo-Bar	"Am Tag, als der Regen kam"	Wolfgang Glück	
1977	Dalida pour toujours	Principal singer on entire soundtrack	Michel Dumoulin	
1979	Série noire	"Le Lambeth Walk"	Alain Corneau	
1984	La Triche	"Fini, la comédie" and "Je suis toutes les femmes"	Yannick Bellon	
1991	Hors la vie (a.k.a. "Out of Life")	"Salma ya salama"	Maroun Bagdadi	
1994	Mina Tannenbaum	"Il venait d'avoir 18 ans"	Martine Dugowson	
1995	Gazon Maudit (a.k.a. "French Twist")	"Histoire d'un amour"	Josiane Balasko	
1995	Pigalle	Unknown	Karim Dridi	
1996	Pédale douce	"Bambino", "Salma ya salama" and "Je suis toutes les femmes"	Gabriel Aghion	
1996	Un Air de Famille (a.k.a. "Family Resemblances" (US))	"Come prima"	Cédric Klapisch	
1997	On connaît la chanson a.k.a. "Same Old Song" (US)	"Paroles, paroles"	Alain Resnais	
1997	Mémoires d'immigrés, l'héritage maghrébin	"Helwa ya baladi"	Yamina Benguigui	
1998	A Soldier's Daughter Never Cries a.k.a. "La fille d'un soldat ne pleure jamais" (France) a.k.a. "Soldier's Daughter Never Cries" (Australia: TV title)	"Ciao amore, ciao"	James Ivory	
1999	Novios	"Gigi l'Amoroso"	Joaquín Oristrell	
1999	Recto/Verso	"Paroles, paroles"	Jean-Marc Longval	
1999	Tontaine et Tonton	"Il venait d'avoir 18 ans" and "Gigi l'amoroso"	Tonie Marshall	
1999	The Bridge	Unknown	Gérard Depardieu	
2001	Souffle	"Buenas noches mi amor"	Muriel Coulin and Delphine Coulin	
2001	Mauvais genres a.k.a. "Transfixed" (Canada: English title: festival title) (US) a.k.a. "Bad Genres" (International: English title: festival title) a.k.a. "Gender Bias" (US)	"Il venait d'avoir 18 ans"	Francis Girod	
2001	Absolument fabuleux	"Il venait d'avoir 18 ans"	Gabriel Aghion	
2001	C'est la vie	"Darla dirladada"	Jean-Pierre Améris	
2001	Paroles de Bibs	"Paroles, paroles"	Jocelyne Lemaire-Darnaud	
20XX	La Bonne Addresse	"Pezzettini di bikini"	Gary Goldman	
2002	L'Adversaire a.k.a. "The Adversary"	"Histoire d'un amour"	Nicole Garcia	
2003	Perduto Amor	"Itsi bitsi petit bikini"	Franco Battiato	
2005	Dalida	Principal singer on entire soundtrack	Joyce Buñuel	
2005	L'un reste, l'autre part	"Il venait d'avoir 18 ans"	Claude Berri	
2005	The Secret Life of Words (International: English title) (UK) (US) a.k.a. "La vida secreta de las palabras" (Spain) a.k.a. "La vida secreta de les paraules" (Spain: Catalan title)	"Histoire d'un amour"	Isabel Coixet	
2006	OSS 117, Le Caire nid d'espions a.k.a. "OSS 117, Nest of Spies"	"Bambino"	Michel Hazanavicius	
2007	Michou D'Auber	"Bambino"	Thomas Gilou	
2007	L'Ennemi intime a.k.a. "Intimate Enemies" (Canada: English title)	"Come prima"	Florent Emilio Siri	
2008	Mesrine : L'Instinct de mort	"Romantica" and "La Danse de Zorba"	Jean-François Richet	
2010	Les Amours Imaginaires (Canada: Original title) a.k.a. "Heartbeats" (US) (Europe: English title: festival title) a.k.a. Fantastikes agapes (Greece: Greek title) a.k.a. Love, Imagined (International: English title)	"Bang Bang"	Xavier Dolan	
2011	Les femmes du 6è étage (France: Original title) a.k.a. "Las chicas de la 6ª planta" (Spanish title) a.k.a. "The Women on the 6th Floor" (English title) a.k.a. "Service Entrance"	"Itsi bitsi petit bikini"	Philippe Le Guay	
2011	Le Skylab	"Bambino"	Julie Delpy	
2014	Apprenti Gigolo	"La Violetera" and "Le Torrent"	John Turturro	
2017	Dalida	Principal singer on entire soundtrack	Lisa Azuelos	
2018	Love Addict	"Monday, Tuesday...Laissez-moi danser"	Frank Bellocq	
2021	No Time to Die	"Dans la ville endormie"	Cary Joji Fukunaga	
