= Ils ont changé ma chanson =

Studio album by Dalida
- Released: 1970
- Recorded: 1970
- Genres: World music; pop; adult contemporary
- Labels: Orlando International Shows; Sonopresse

Dalida chronology
Ma mère me disait (1969)	Ils ont changé ma chanson (1970)	Une vie (1971)

Ils ont changé ma maison (They Changed My Song) is a 1970 album by Dalida.

The album coincided with several changes in Dalida's career: the 1970s were coming, her label was no longer Barclay Records but her brother's Orlando International Shows, and she was also changing her style to a more mature adult contemporary music. The success of this album is the proof, exemplified by the Greek folkloric summer hit "Darla dirladada", "Ils ont changé ma chanson", and "Lady d'Arbanville".

== Mon Frère le soleil ==
Tending towards original material, Dalida collaborated with Mikis Theodorakis in 1970. He composed a melody specially for her, which under lyrics by Pierre Delanoë became "Mon Frère le soleil" ("My Brother, the Sun"). The song did not receive any TV promotion upon its release, only to be used seven years later in a 1977 documentary Dalida pour toujours where Dalida performs an excerpt – released on eponymous soundtrack album the same year. Also in 1977, the song was reissued on a new studio album Salma ya salama and received its only TV performance.

=== Covers ===
The song went on to be covered in several languages by numerous artists.

In 1971, Maria Dimitriadi and George Kapernaros covered, each on its own, the song in Greek as "To Treno Fevgi Stis Okto" (Greek: Το Τρένο Φεύγει Στις Οκτώ) with lyrics by Manos Eleftheriou. The lyrics are an adaptation of Eleftheriou's previously published poem.

That version subsequently received many covers by other artists: Manolis Mitsias in 1974, Maria Farantouri in 1980, Haris Alexiou and Dimitra Galani in duet in 1981, Agnes Baltsa in 1986, Sumi Jo in 2000, and Shin Nal Sae in 2011.

From 1978 to 1980, Milva covered the song in three other languages; German as "Freiheit, Gleichheit und so weiter", Italian as "Come spiegarti" and French as “Les Quais de la gare de Berlin". Thus she created a second French version.

== Track listing ==
1. Ils ont changé ma chanson
2. Si c'était à refaire
3. Mon Frère le soleil (1er mix)
4. Les Jardins de Marmara
5. Diable de temps
6. Darla dirladada
7. Une jeunesse
8. Lady d'Arbanville
9. Pour qui, pour quoi
10. Entre les lignes entre les mots
11. Ram dam dam

== Singles ==
- 1970 Darla dirladada
- 1970 Ils ont changé ma chanson / Ram dam dam
- 1970 Pour qui, pour quoi / Lady d'Arbanville / Si c'était à refaire / Entre les lignes entre les mots

== See also ==
- Dalida
- List of Dalida songs
- Dalida albums discography
- Dalida singles discography
