= Manuel (album) =

Studio album by Dalida
- Released: 1974
- Recorded: 1974
- Genres: World music; pop; adult contemporary
- Labels: Orlando International Shows; Sonopresse

Dalida chronology
Julien (1973)	Manuel (1974)	J'attendrai (1975)

Manuel is an album by Dalida, recorded and released in 1974.

== Track listing ==
1. Manuel
2. Seule avec moi
3. Justine
4. Ta Femme
5. Anima mia
6. Nous sommes tous morts à 20 ans
7. Ma vie je la chante
8. La Consultation
9. Comme tu dois avoir froid
10. Des Gens qu'on aimerait connaître
11. Gigi l'amoroso

== Singles ==
- 1974 Gigi l'amoroso (Gigi l'amour) / Il venait d'avoir 18 ans
- 1974 Ta Femme
- 1974 Manuel

== See also ==
- List of Dalida songs
- Dalida albums discography
- Dalida singles discography
