= Femme est la nuit =

Studio album by Dalida
- Released: 1977
- Recorded: 1976
- Genres: Disco; pop; art rock; adult contemporary
- Labels: Orlando International Shows; Sonopresse
- Producer: Orlando

Dalida chronology
| Coup de chapeau au passé (1976) | Femme est la nuit (1977) | Olympia 77 (1977) |

Femme est la nuit is a 1977 album by Dalida.

== Track listing ==
1. Femme est la nuit
2. Comme si tu revenais d'un long voyage
3. Il y a toujours une chanson
4. Les clefs de l'amour
5. Captain Sky
6. Amoureuse de la vie
7. Tables séparées
8. Comme si tu étais là
9. Voyages sans bagages
10. Et tous ces regards

== Singles ==
- 1977 Captain Sky
- 1977 Amoureuse de la vie / Femme est la nuit

== See also ==
- Dalida
- List of Dalida songs
- Dalida albums discography
- Dalida singles discography
