= Olympia 77 =

Live album by Dalida
- Released: 1977
- Recorded: 1977
- Genres: Live; world music; pop music; adult contemporary music
- Labels: Orlando International Shows; Sonopresse

Dalida chronology
Femme est la nuit (1977)	Olympia 77 (1977)	Salma ya salama (1977)

Olympia 77 is an album of songs by Dalida recorded live at the Olympia in Paris and released in 1977.

== Track listing ==
1. "Il y a toujours une chanson"
2. "Les clefs de l'amour"
3. "Le petit bonheur"
4. "Tables séparées"
5. "Comme si tu étais là"
6. "Amoureuse de la vie"
7. "Pot-pourri"
8. "ll venait d'avoir 18 ans"
9. "Je suis malade"
10. "J'attendrai"
11. "Femme est la nuit"
12. "Et tous ces regards"

== See also ==
- List of Dalida songs
- Dalida albums discography
- Dalida singles discography
