= Julien (album) =

Studio album by Dalida
- Released: 1973
- Recorded: 1973
- Genres: World music; pop; adult contemporary
- Labels: Orlando International Shows; Sonopresse

Dalida chronology
Il faut du temps (1972)	Julien (1973)	Manuel (1974)

Julien is a studio album of songs by Dalida recorded and released in 1973.

== Track listing ==
1. Julien
2. Ô Seigneur Dieu
3. Je suis malade
4. Vado via
5. Paroles, paroles
6. Non ce n'est pas pour moi
7. Il venait d'avoir 18 ans
8. Soleil d'un nouveau monde
9. Mais il y a l'accordéon
10. Le Temps de mon père
11. Rien qu'un homme de plus

== Singles ==
- 1973 – Paroles, paroles
- 1973 – Mais il y a l'accordéon
- 1973 – Vado via
- 1973 – Julien
- 1974 – Gigi l'amoroso (Gigi l'amour) / Il venait d'avoir 18 ans
