= Paroles, paroles =

1973 song by Dalida

- Cover of single

Single by Dalida and Alain Delon

from the album Julien
- B-side: "Pour ne pas vivre seul"
- Released: 17 January 1973
- Recorded: 1972
- Studio: Des Dames
- Genre: Bossa nova; chanson
- Length: 4:05
- Label: International Shows
- Composer: Gianni Ferrio
- Lyricist: Michaële
- Producer: Orlando

Music video
- "Paroles, paroles" on YouTube

"Paroles, paroles" (French pronunciation: [paʁɔl(ə) paʁɔl(ə)]; English: "Words, words"), also styled as "Paroles... Paroles...", is a song by French singer Dalida featuring French actor Alain Delon, with music by Gianni Ferrio and lyrics by Michaële, released on 17 January 1973 as the lead single from Dalida's upcoming album Julien (1973).

The lyrics describe the conversation of a man offering a woman caramels, bonbons et chocolat ("caramels, candies and chocolate") followed with a shower of compliments, to which she says they mean nothing to her because they are just paroles – i.e. empty words. The song achieved big success in France and internationally, especially in Japan and Mexico, becoming one of the most recognizable French songs of all time. The first music video was released in 2019, over 46 years after the songs's release.

"Paroles, paroles" is a cover of the 1972 Italian song "Parole parole" by Mina and Alberto Lupo. Dalida's release sparked numerous covers in various languages, mostly due to her international career. The song was an unavoidable part of her repertoire, carrying her on tours in Europe, Japan, Latin America, the Arab world and the Francophone countries of Africa. Today it is regarded as Dalida's signature song and one of the classics of French chanson. While the expression paroles, paroles entered everyday language, immediately upon its release it was picked up by French politicians, and is ever since "used to evoke those who make promises and never hold them".

== Background and recording ==
In early 1972, composer Gianni Ferrio and lyricists Leo Chiosso and Giancarlo Del Re wrote the song "Parole, parole" in Italian. It was created as a new opening theme for popular prime time Italian TV show Teatro 10, to which they were soundtrack creators. The show's hosts, singer Mina and actor Alberto Lupo, were the first to record it, and it was released in April of the same year. The song was a hit in Italy.

Dalida's brother and producer Orlando was in Italy at the time and noticed the song. He met the rights holder and offered Dalida to record her version, and she liked the idea. For the male voice, Dalida decided herself that she would ask Alain Delon, her friend of 17 years. He was delighted with the offer and immediately accepted. In 2011, Delon revealed that in the 1960s they had a romance that no one knew about but them. Orlando asked the young writer Michaële to write the words because she, like Dalida, was born in Egypt and would understand Dalida's Italian accent. She accepted with satisfaction and Delon especially liked her text, as did Dalida, who wanted minor changes, which did not happen due to Michaële insistence.

"Paroles, paroles"
"[For] me, tender words wrapped in sweetness
Land on my mouth, but never on my heart
Words and words and words..." (Note: Original French: "Moi, les mots tendres enrobés de douceur / Se posent sur ma bouche, mais jamais sur mon cœur / Paroles et paroles et paroles...".)

The music was recorded separately from the vocals. Orlando and Guy Motta, Dalida's longtime concert conductor, made a complete remake of the instrumental, leaning towards Bossa nova. The vocals were also recorded separately. In Studio Des Dames, Dalida first recorded her part. Then Delon turned off the lights, asked for a stool and, while looking at Dalida in the dark, gave his answer to the soundtrack. Alain Delon said in 2006 that by the end of the song, as he repeated the lyrics "que tu es belle" (how beautiful you are), Dalida was constantly laughing. He recalled telling her: "I'm not telling you 'how beautiful you are' because those are the lyrics, but because you are beautiful!"

Mastering was led by Jean-Pierre Dupuy. In 2021. documentary "Archives secrètes", Orlando revealed that in the studio, after everyone had recorded their part, he asked Dalida and Delon to sing the song together, out of pleasure. He recalls: "There was a complicity that was not present when they recorded each their voices separately. I remember I watched out very much during the montage thinking on their "live performance" they improvised together."

== Release and reception ==
"Paroles, paroles" was released in France on a 18 cm (7") single under catalog number IS 45 711 of Dalida's private label International Shows, and distributed by Sonopresse. The B-side of the single is "Pour ne pas vivre seul". In other states it was released over the next few months, in Japan in April. Principality of releases have the same cover, with uncredited photos that were shot in her house garden on Montmartre. The photos were shot during the occasion that spawned one of the most iconic images of France in 1970s; "Dalida and Delon in rue d'Orchampt". Editions have translations of titles by country languages and font adjustments. Dutch and Argentinian releases feature completely different cover photos. Japanese release features the closeup of the main cover image, while the B-side is changed to "Une vie". Its 1980 re-edition changes B-side to "J'attendrai". Also a Japanese EP was published, with 3 other songs alongside "Paroles, paroles" and a cover photo that is closeup of verso cover from French release.

The song was an international hit and a huge sales success. It topped of various charts or hit parades. About half a million copies sold in France, over 200,000 in Japan and hundreds of thousands more in other countries. Equally a great success at Dalida's concerts where it was received by the audience. In her 1974 series of concert at Olympia, Delon's voice was replaced by stars of the time; Mike Brant, Ringo, Claude Francois and Patrick Juvet, while video of them was projected behind Dalida.

She prevented by touring Lebanon in January, and he with the filming of Two Men in Town, they never performed the song together on TV. Dalida made 2 appearances alone on TV in 1973, once only in the room and the second time a sketch in the telephone booth as if talking to Delon, while his videos are being shown. With Roger Pierre, she made a sketch of a funny nature in 1973. In 1983, she performed it with Ginni Gallan for her Formule un episode, which is the only time "Paroles, paroles" was performed solely by women.

=== Other languages ===
Dalida recorded the song in German twice, first in 1973 with Friedrich Schütter, and in 1984 with Harald Juhnke. Both songs were of minimal success.

== Trivia ==
- The single was released on Dalida's 40th birthday.
- Alberto Lupo hosted the 1967 Partitissima, which was won by Dalida, and he starred opposite her in the 1968 Italian film Io ti amo.
- The 2019 release features, at the end of the song, Delon's voice taken from a TV programme aired on 24 November 2018, where he expressed his love for Dalida.

== Formats and track listings ==
All digital releases
No.	Title	Length
1.	"Paroles, paroles"	4:04
Total length:		4:04

7" single
No.	Title	Length
1.	"Paroles... paroles..."	3:59
2.	"Pour ne pas vivre seul"	3:00
Total length:		6:59

Japanese 7" single
No.	Title	Length
1.	"Paroles... paroles"	4:07
2.	"Une vie"	3:08
Total length:		7:15

12" maxi-single
No.	Title	Length
1.	"Version originale : Mastering 2019"	4:11
2.	"Extended Mix by Douméa"	5:14
3.	"Sunshine Remix (Radio Edit)"	3:59
Total length:		13:24

== Personnel ==
Credits adapted from liner notes.

- Guy Motta and his orchestra – conducting
- Jean-Pierre Dupuy – music recorded by
- Orlando – producing and artistic realisation
- Gianni Ferrio – composer
- Michaële – lyricist

== Charts ==
Chart (1973)	Peak position
Belgium (Ultratop Wallonia)	4
France (Hit parade RTL)	1
Japan (Music labo - Billboard)	5
Luxembourg (Hit parade RTL)	4
Mexico (Radio Mil - Billboard)	3
Monaco (Hit parade RMC)	1
Portugal	3
Turkey	17

== Legacy ==
Over time, the song gained enormous significance in the world as one of the most famous French songs. The title itself has settled into the collective unconscious and has become a formula used in everyday language to denote those who speak empty words. Deeply rooted in France, "Paroles, paroles" is unvoidable to be quoted by politicians in response to the shallow promises of their opposition, or even to be sang like Marine Le Pen did in 2012. In the same time, the song is comedians' favorite material for mocking politicians. In 2004, the song was used for a national energy campaign in France.

The only official video clip of "Paroles, paroles" was released on February 25, 2019. That was followed with a 12" maxi-single picture disc, released on 13 September 2019.

== Cover versions ==
Despite the initial moderate international success of the Italian song, Dalida's 1973 release sparked numerous covers in various languages, and has since been covered dozens of times. On France 2's 1996 New Year's Eve programme, Alain Delon performed the French version in duet with Céline Dion, as a tribute to Dalida. In 2001, again tributing Dalida, the French cover was remixed by the participants of the first edition of Star Academy France.

Below is a list of versions based on Dalida's release.

- "Amai Sasayaki" (あまい囁き; "Sweet Whispers"), the Japanese version, was recorded by Akiko Nakamura and actor Toshiyuki Hosokawa in 1973. Japanese jazz pianist Shigeo Sekitō recorded an instrumental electronic version on his 1975 funk album Special Sound Series Vol. 2.
- Two Dutch translations were made in 1973: the first one, "Die woorden, die woorden" ("Those words, those words"), was recorded by Belgian duo Nicole and Hugo, and the second, entitled "Gebabbel" ("Chatter"), with lyrics by author Cees Nooteboom, was performed by Liesbeth List and Ramses Shaffy in the Netherlands. This version was parodied in 1992 by Dutch comedian Paul de Leeuw and female singer Willeke Alberti. Their version was a major hit in The Netherlands, reaching number 2 in the Top 40.
- A Turkish version ("Palavra palavra") was recorded by Turkish singer and actress Ajda Pekkan with voice actor Cüneyt Türel in 1975. In 2010, another version of the song was recorded by Turkish pop and rock singers Göksel and Teoman.
- In 1978, a bilingual version with Mandarin lyrics and Cantonese spoken word, titled "Bie luanlai" (Chinese: 別亂來; pinyin: Bié luànlái; Jyutping: Bit6 lyun6 loi4; "Don't Mess Around"), was recorded by Hong Kong singer Amina (former member of The Chopsticks) in duet with Taiwanese lyricist Johnny Yip.
- A Greek version, "Kouventes" (Κουβέντες), was recorded by Marinella and Kostas Spyropoulos on her 1992 album I Marinella Tragouda Megales Kyries.
- In 2004, a Vietnamese cover version was released: "Những Lời Mê Hoặc" ("Those Seductive Words") by Minh Tuyết featuring Trần Thái Hòa.
- Amanda Lear performed "Paroles, paroles" with Titoff on TV channel M6. This version was included on her 2005 compilation Paris by Night – Greatest Hits.
- A house remix of the French song, bearing the Italian title "Parole parole", was featured in the 2005 compilation album Disco Tanz by Italian DJ Gigi D'Agostino.
- Zap Mama recorded a cover version with French actor Vincent Cassel on her album ReCreation in 2009.
- Greek-German singer Vicky Leandros recorded a German version, titled "Gerede Gerede" ("Talk Talk") with the actor Ben Becker for her 2010 album Zeitlos (Timeless).
- The 2018 hit song "Dalida" by Algerian rapper Soolking incorporates a sample from the chorus of "Paroles, paroles".
- Azerbaijani singer Flora Karimova recorded the song in Azerbaijani as "Unutma, unutma", with Agil M. Guliyev.
- In 2021, Jarvis Cocker released a cover version on his album Chansons d'Ennui Tip-Top featuring Lætitia Sadier.
