= Salma Ya Salama =

"Salma Ya Salama" may refer to:

- "Salma Ya Salama" (song), 1918
- Salma ya salama (album), 1977
