= Olympia 71 =

Live album by Dalida
- Released: 1972
- Recorded: 1971
- Genres: Live; world music; pop; adult contemporary
- Labels: Orlando International Shows; Sonopresse

Dalida chronology
Une vie (1971)	Olympia 71 (1972)	Il faut du temps (1972)

Olympia 71 is an album of songs by Dalida recorded live at the Olympia in Paris in 1971 and released in 1972.

== Track listing ==
1. "Non"
2. "Chanter les voix"
3. "Hene matov"
4. "Tout au plus"
5. "Toutes les Femmes du monde"
6. "Les choses de l'amour"
7. "Ils ont changé ma chanson"
8. "Une vie"
9. "Avec le temps"
10. "Ciao amore, ciao"
