= Gigi in Paradisco =

Studio album by Dalida
- Released: 1980
- Recorded: 1979–1980
- Genres: World music; pop; disco; adult contemporary music
- Labels: Orlando International Shows; Carrere

Dalida chronology
Dédié à toi (1979)	Gigi in Paradisco (1980)	Olympia 81 (1981)

Gigi in Paradisco is a bilingual French and English-language album released in 1980 by Italian-French singer Dalida. Two singles were released, both of which received gold certifications.

== Background ==
This album was launched after a highly successful American-style series of shows that Dalida performed at the Palais des Sports theatre in France. She was the first female singer to perform this kind of show at the venue with twelve costume changes and eleven dancers. All the show's 18 nights were sell-outs.

The album, like the show, was highly successful and it was a critical and commercial success. It also helped Dalida to create more of a sexy and Diva like image. Learning dance routines for over three months with John Travolta's Saturday Night Fever choreographer Lester Wilson, Dalida (aged 47 at the time) reinvented herself through this show and once more attracted a new generation of fans.

== Track listing ==
1. "Gigi in Paradisco"
2. "Comme disait Mistinguett"
3. "Alabama Song" (English)
4. "ll faut danser reggae"
5. "Money, money" (English)
6. "Je suis toutes les femmes"

== Singles ==
- "Il faut danser reggae" / "Comme disait Mistinguett"

This single was released in 1979, before the album was out. "Il faut danser Reggae" was a reggae song which broke out of the disco trend of the time. TV performances of this track saw Dalida dancing in leopard-print dresses in tropical style while surrounded by topless male dancers. "Comme disait Mistinguett" talks about Dalida's music career with a bit of humour. For TV promotion of the song, Dalida wore a long pink cape with a sexy outfit underneath. It won her a gold disc.

It was during this disco period that Dalida started to gain following in the gay community, which is still maintained today.

- "Gigi in Paradisco" / "Je suis toutes les femmes"

"Gigi in Paradisco", the title track of the album, was released as a single in 1980. The song is the continuation of Dalida's biggest worldwide hit "Gigi l'amoroso". The 13-minute song follows the tragic events of Gigi that dies and goes up to disco heaven. Dalida created this song essentially to use during her shows but eventually it was released as a single, with the track being edited to four minutes. It was Dalida's last disco hit, and it also earned gold certification.
