= Les Gitans =

Studio album by Dalida
- Released: October 25, 1958
- Recorded: 1958
- Length: 27:55
- Label: Barclay

Dalida chronology
Gondolier (1958)	Les Gitans (1958)	Le disque d'or de Dalida (1959)

Singles from Les Gitans
- 1. "Dans le bleu du ciel bleu (Volume 9)" Released: 1958; 2. "Je pars (Volume 10)" Released: 1958; 3. "Aïe! mon cœur (Volume 11)" Released: September 1958; 4. "Les gitans (Volume 12)" Released: 1958

Les Gitans is the fourth studio album by French-Italian singer Dalida, released by Barclay Records, catalogue number 80 094, in 1958. In 2002, Sammel released a remastered version in CD and 10" (25 cm) vinyl record (LP), catalogue number 981 109-7. In 2004, Universal Records released a remastered CD, catalogue number 981 108-5, as part of a compilation containing re-releases of all of Dalida's studio albums recorded under the Barclay label.

== Track listing ==
Barclay – 80 094 Ⓜ, 981 109-7:

Side one
No.	Title	Writer(s)	Length
1.	"Les gitans"	Hubert Giraud & Pierre Cour	3:35
2.	"Aïe! mon cœur" (La Portuguesa)	Eddy Marnay & Enrique Escudé Cofiner	2:15
3.	"Inconnu mon amour" (Tiré du film : Rapt au 2ème bureau)	Hubert Giraud, Jean Broussolle & Pierre Delanoë	2:20
4.	"Adieu monsieur mon amour"	Jean Broussolle, Sidney Norman & Ted Gilbert	2:39
5.	"Rendez-vous au Lavandou"	André Pascal & Paul Mauriat	3:07

Side two
No.	Title	Writer(s)	Length
1.	"Dans le bleu du ciel bleu" (Nel Blu Dipinto Di Blu)	Domenico Modugno, Franco Migliacci & Jacques Larue	2:51
2.	"Je pars" (Alone)	Fernand Bonifay, Morty Craft & Selma Craft	2:29
3.	"Timide sérénade"	Jean Broussolle, Nicola Salerno & Luigi Pulci	2:55
4.	"Marchande de fruits"	Jean-Yves Gran	2:50
5.	"Dieu seul" (Love Me For Ever)	Gary Lynes & Pierre Delanoë	2:27
Total length:			27:55

== Singles ==
- 1958 "Dans le bleu du ciel bleu", also "Volume 9"
- 1958 "Je pars", also "Volume 10"
- 1958 "Aïe! Mon cœur", also "Volume 11"
- 1958 "Les Gitans", also "Volume 12"

== See also ==
- Dalida albums discography

== Sources ==
- L'argus Dalida: Discographie mondiale et cotations, by Daniel Lesueur, Éditions Alternatives, 2004. ISBN 2-86227-428-3 and ISBN 978-2-86227-428-7.
