= Monday, Tuesday... Laissez-moi danser =

1979 single by Dalida

- Single cover

Song by Dalida
- Released: June 15, 1979
- Recorded: 1979
- Studio: CBE
- Genre: Disco
- Length: 3:47
- Label: International Shows
- Composer: Toto Cutugno
- Lyricists: Pierre Delanoë; Jeff Barnel
- Producer: Orlando

"Monday, Tuesday... Laissez-moi danser" ("Let Me Dance") is a 1979 disco single by French-Italian recording artist Dalida. It was a number-one hit and the biggest success of the disco period in France.

== Description ==
The song was written by Toto Cutugno who offered it to Dalida and recorded it himself to Italian lyrics by Cristiano Minellono, under the title "Voglio l'anima" ("I Want the Soul"). Dalida recorded the song in three languages; French, Spanish; "Déjame bailar", and English; "Let Me Dance Tonight". The English-language version was released on 7" single, backed with an English version of "Il venait d'avoir 18 ans".

The French version of the song was released on her 1979 album Dédié à toi. It topped the French chart in 1979, and had considerable success throughout Europe, thus also featuring on numerous posthumous compilation albums.

A video was not made to accompany the original release; however, Dalida did make several TV appearances performing the song. A 2001 remix by French disco-artist Cerrone, which samples his 1981 track "Took Me So Long", is accompanied by a video, using archive footage and computer-generated effects.

=== Track listings ===
==== 7" single ====
1. "Monday, Tuesday... Laissez-moi danser" — 3:35
2. "Comme toi" — 3:40

=== Charts ===
Chart (1979–1980)	Peak position
France	1
Quebec	3
Flanders	22
Europe	24
Israel	26

Chart (2017–2018)	Peak position
Australia	93
France	94

== Star Academy version ==
"Laissez-moi danser"

Single by Star Academy 4

from the album Fait son cinéma
- B-side: "Remix + Instrumental"
- Released: September 2004
- Genre: Pop
- Length: 3:37
- Label: Universal Records; Mercury
- Composer: Toto Cutugno
- Lyricists: Pierre Delanoë; Jeff Barnel
- Producer: Antoine Angelelli

Star Academy 4 singles chronology
"Laissez-moi danser" (2004)	"En chantant" (2004)

In 2004, the song was covered by Star Academy 4 in France, under the shorter name "Laissez-moi danser". This version was released as single in September 2004 and was successful, reached number one for six weeks on the French and Belgian Singles Charts. As of August 2014, the song was the 27th best-selling single of the 21st century in France, with 505,000 units sold.

=== Track listings ===
==== CD single ====
1. "Laissez-moi danser" — 3:37
2. "Laissez-moi danser" (remix) — 3:53
3. "Laissez-moi danser" (instrumental) — 3:37

=== Certifications ===
Country	Certification	Date	Sales certified
Belgium	Gold	November 6, 2004	20,000

=== Charts ===
Chart (2004)	Peak position
Belgian (Wallonia) Singles Chart	1
French Singles Chart	1
Swiss Singles Chart	7

Year-end chart (2004)	Position
Belgian (Wallonia) Singles Chart	10
French Singles Chart	5
Swiss Singles Chart	83
