= Darla dirladada =

1970 single by Dalida

- Cover of single

Song by Dalida
- Released: July 15, 1970
- Recorded: 1970
- Genre: Chanson; Greek folk
- Length: 3:18
- Label: Productions International Shows
- Composer: Folklore
- Lyricist: Boris Bergman
- Producer: Orlando

"Darla dirladada" is a song recorded by Italian French singer Dalida, first released as a single during the summer of 1970. It was a #1 hit in France. The song is based on the Greek folk song "Dirlada" (Greek: Ντιρλαντά), originating from the island of Kalymnos in Greece.

== Origins ==
The original song was released by Margareta Pâslaru [Rou] in 1969. It was conceived as a song that sponge divers would sing when traveling with their caïque boats across the seas. The rhythm of the song was supposed to coordinate with the rhythm of the handler of the air pump so as to provide a steady supply of oxygen to divers. The song's lyrics contain words of encouragement and the opportunity awaiting the crew.

One of the most notable recordings is that performed by Pantelis Ginnis, a Kalymnian sponge diver captain, who, in his version, is making a reference to another respected diver captain, Manolis (Emmanuel) Theodosiou, whose nickname was 'Kobalis'. Ginnis, in his version, relates the time Kobalis walked into a coffee shop where Ginnis was singing "Darla dirladada".

== Modern versions ==
Dionysis Savvopoulos sang "Dirlada" on his 1969 album To Perivoli tou Trelou. In 1970 the song was recorded by French singer Dalida. It was released as a single from her album Ils ont changé ma chanson, on which it features as the sixth track. Dalida also recorded the song in Italian, German, and English-language versions.

In the same year it was also recorded by Cypriot-American-Israeli singer Trifonas Nikolaidis in Israel and released as an EP with 2 additional songs on the B-side.

It was the inspiration for the 1971 pop song Loop di Love by Juan Bastós.

The famous Greek singer Marinella recorded two spirited cover versions of the song in 1971. One appeared on a compilation LP with various artists entitled ‘’Ena Karavi Yemato Tragoudia / A Boat Full of Songs’’. The other more known version appears as the last track of her studio album ‘’Enas Mithos/A Story’’

In 1973, Chilean singer José Alfredo Fuentes recorded an adaptation of the song in Spanish, released as "Dirladada".

The song has been covered by the Belgian-Flemish singer Marva. The most notable cover version, so far, is that of G.O. Culture in 1993, which became a huge hit in France.

The song is popular in Finland as well, recorded with Finnish lyrics by Kai Hyttinen in 1972. Erkki Pälli, a Finnish music producer and a journalist, heard this rousing song on a holiday in Rhodos back in 1971–72 and brought it back home with him. He offered it to Kai "Kuju" Hyttinen, who got a hit single of it. Pälli had just misheard the song and in Finland it is known as "Dirlanda" or "Dirlandaa". Finnish music group Jean S. has also re-covered the song.

In 1995, for their fifth album, the Macedonian rock band "Memorija", recorded a version of this song, titled "Dirlada".

In 2018, the Romanian band D-l Goe covered the song to honour the 1st of March holiday, using an electro rock approach for the Romanian lyrics, previously used by singer Margareta Paslaru.

Dana International recorded her own version of the song, "ir la dir la da da", which became a big hit in Israel in 2001.

== Dalida version ==
=== Track listings ===
7" single

1. "Darla dirladada" — 3:15
2. "Diable de temps" — 2:30

7" maxi - 1996 release

1. "Darla dirladada" (disco 96 mix) — 6:55
2. "Darla dirladada" (sirtaki mix) — 4:04

== G.O. Culture version ==
"Darla dirladada"

Single by G.O. Culture
- B-side: "Powe a Wanda" + Remix
- Released: June 1993
- Genre: Eurodance
- Length: 3:17
- Label: Scorpio, Warner Music
- Songwriters: Boris Bergman, Jean Musy; Ginis Pantelis

G.O. Culture singles chronology
"Darla dirladada" (1993)	"Na Na Na" (1993)

In 1993, the band G.O. Culture covered the song in a house and techno version. In France, this version was a success in discothèques and in terms of sales. Lyrics are completely changed and refer to Patrice Leconte's film, Les Bronzés. The single was the major summer hit in France and stayed for 29 weeks in the top 50, 22 of them in the top ten. The music video shows the singers performing the song on a beach and on a boat. Several remixes were produced by the French band Pleasure Game. This cover version has been covered in turn by K.O. Culture in 2006 in a remixed version.

=== Track listings ===
CD maxi

1. "Darla dirladada" (tropical club mix radio edit)
2. "Darla dirladada" (tropical club)
3. "Darla dirladada" (techno dance mix)
4. "Powe a Wanda"

Cassette / CD single

1. "Darla dirladada"
2. "Powe a Wanda"

12" maxi

1. "Darla dirladada"
2. "Darla dirladada" (maxi version) — 5:39

=== Certifications and sales ===
Region	Certification	Certified units/sales
France (SNEP)	Gold	250,000^{*}
^{*} Sales figures based on certification alone.

=== Charts ===
Chart (1993)	Peak position
Finland (Suomen virallinen lista)	4
France (SNEP)	1
