= Dédié à toi =

Studio album by Dalida
- Released: 1979
- Recorded: 1979
- Studio: Studio CBE
- Labels: Orlando International Shows; Carrere
- Producer: Bruno Gigliotti

Dalida chronology
Salma ya salama (1977)	Dédié à toi (1979)	Gigi in Paradisco (1980)

Dédié à toi is a French studio album released by Dalida in 1979.

== Background ==
In this album, Dalida sings once more Jacques Brel's "Quand on n'a que l'amour". She also memorializes her late lover Luigi Tenco through a cover of one of his masterpieces, "Vedrai vedrai". It includes her hit "Monday, Tuesday... Laissez-moi danser", and a patriotic homage to her birth country, Egypt, "Helwa ya balady".

It sold very well, meanwhile in Denmark it was certified gold in 1982 for selling 50 000 copies.

== Track listing ==
1. "Dédié à toi"
2. "The Lambeth Walk" (English)
3. "Va, va, va"
4. "Quand on n'a que l'amour"
5. "Helwa ya balady"
6. "Vedrai vedrai"
7. "Comme disait Mistinguett"
8. "Problemorama (L'argent... l'argent...)"
9. "Monday, Tuesday... Laissez-moi danser"
10. "Depuis qu'il vient chez nous"

== Singles ==
- "Le Lambeth Walk... C'était pas compliqué"
- Helwa ya balady
- "Problemorama" / "Depuis qu'il vient chez nous"
- "Monday, Tuesday... Laissez-moi danser"
