= Salma ya salama (album) =

Studio album by Dalida
- Released: March 1977
- Recorded: July 1976
- Genres: World music; pop; adult contemporary
- Labels: Orlando International Shows; Sonopresse

Dalida chronology
Olympia 77 (1977)	Salma ya salama (1977)	Dédié à toi (1979)

Salma ya salama is a studio album released by French singer Dalida in March 1977.

== Background ==
The song "Tu m'as déclaré l'amour" was released as a single few months before the album in 1976. With lyrics by Claude Carmone and Pascal Sevran, it is a sole French language cover of “Verde luna” from the film Blood and Sand. The single gained new popularity 8 years later in USSR when it sold almost half million copies in 1984.

== Track listing ==
1. "Salma ya salama" (French)
2. "Notre façon de vivre"
3. "Histoire d'aimer"
4. "Tu m'as déclaré l'amour"
5. "Mon frère le soleil"
6. "Quand s'arrêtent les violons"
7. "Ti amo"
8. "Remember... c'était loin"
9. "À chaque fois j'y crois"
10. "Salma ya salama" (Arabic)

== Singles ==
- 1977: "Histoire d'aimer"
- 1977: "Remember... C'était loin"
- 1977: "Salma ya salama"
