= J'attendrai =

French song composed by Dino Olivieri and Louis Poterat

"J'attendrai" (French for "I will wait") is a popular French song first recorded by Rina Ketty in 1938, a French version of the Italian song "Tornerai". It became the big French song during World War II; a counterpart to Lale Andersen's "Lili Marlen" in Germany and Vera Lynn's "We'll Meet Again" in Britain.

"Tornerai" (Italian for "You Will Return") ISWC: T-005.001.119-2 composed by Dino Olivieri (music) and Nino Rastelli (lyrics) in 1936, said to be inspired from the Humming Chorus of Puccini's opera Madame Butterfly. It was first recorded in 1937 by both Carlo Buti and Trio Lescano (accompanied by the Italian jazz quartet Quartetto Jazz Funaro),), and became a hit in Italy.

The French lyrics were written by Louis Poterat, and "J'attendrai" became an instant success. Rina Ketty's version was followed the same year by one of Belgian chanteuse Anne Clercy, and both Tino Rossi and Jean Sablon recorded it in 1939. When France was occupied in 1940, it quickly became the big French war song, with the love song's title being interpreted as meaning waiting for peace and/or liberation.

The French version of this Italian song became so well known across Europe that it was often called "J'attendrai" even when recorded instrumentally, such the two versions recorded by Django Reinhardt and Stéphane Grappelli in 1938, or referred to as the original source when sung in other languages, such as Richard Tauber's British "Au revoir" (1945, with lyrics by Bruce Sievier) and Bing Crosby's and Hildegarde's American "I’ll Be Yours" (both 1945 with lyrics by Anna Sosenko). The Crosby version was recorded on December 18, 1945, for Decca Records with Camarata and His Orchestra.

There were also German versions ("Komm zurück", lyrics by Ralph Maria Siegel), sung by both Rudi Schuricke and Horst Winter on recordings made in 1939. The song became known in Denmark as "Kun for dig" (1939, lyrics by Victor Skaarup); in Norway as "Kun for deg" (1939); in Sweden as "Blott för dig'" (1940, lyrics by Tor Bergström); in Poland as "Czekam cię" (recorded in 1939 by Mieczysław Fogg with lyrics by Andrzej Włast); in Czechoslovakia as "Věřím vám" (recorded by both Rudolf Antonín Dvorský and Oldřich Kovář with lyrics by Karel Kozel); and in Lithuania as "Ak, sugrįžk" (with lyrics by Adelė Lenartavičienė).

== Later recordings ==
"J'attendrai"

Single by Dalida

from the album J'attendrai
- B-side: "L'amour à la une"
- Released: 1975
- Recorded: 1975
- Studio: CBE
- Genre: Disco
- Length: 4:14
- Label: International Shows
- Composer: Dino Olivieri
- Lyricist: Louis Poterat
- Producer: Orlando

Dalida singles chronology
"Ne lui dis pas" (1975)	"J'attendrai" (1975)	"Bésame Mucho" (1976)

A popular version of the song was recorded by Dalida for her 1975 album J'attendrai. Single issued on January 12, 1976. Dalida also recorded the song in Italian (Tornerai), German (Komm Zurück) and Spanish (Volveras). It has status of first disco hit in France.

Inspired by Django Reinhardt's version, many stars of the European Gypsy Jazz scene have recorded the song, including Raphaël Faÿs (2000), Fapy Lafertin (1996), Angelo Debarre (2007), and Jimmy Rosenberg (2000). Other Gypsy Jazz versions have been recorded by North American groups such as The Hot Club of Detroit, The Hot Club of San Francisco, and Hot Club Sandwich.

French singer Raquel Bitton sings "J'attendrai" on her album Boleros.

Italian singer Raffaella Carrá covered the song in Italian, titled Tornerai in her 1976 album Forte Forte Forte, and later in Spanish, titled Volveré.

Canadian singer Jill Barber covered the song in her French album Chansons, which was released in 2013.

A recent version of this song was recorded by Italian singer Antonella Ruggiero on the album Souvenir d'Italie, released in 2007.

In 2010, Greek singer Vicky Leandros recorded this song in a new German version entitled "Wenn Du Gehst" ("When you leave"), which is included in her album Zeitlos ("Timeless").

In 2015 a samba jazz version of "J'Attrendai" was recorded by violinist Frederico Britos for his album, Federico Britos Presents Hot Club of the Americas.

In 2016, American musician and former member of Neutral Milk Hotel, Julian Koster, recorded this song with its original title "J'Attrendai", for his podcast, The Orbiting Human Circus (of the Air).

American jazz guitarist Robert Allena released a single of this song in 2020.

== In film ==
Recordings of "Tornerai" / "J'attendrai" have been popular for film and TV soundtracks since the early 1950s, being heard in more than 15 films and TV series, among them Lilacs in the Spring (1954), Arch of Triumph (1984), Das Boot (1981), A Good Year (2006) and Allied (2016).

J'attendrai is the main song in Arch of Triumph, a 1984 film starring Anthony Hopkins and Lesley-Anne Down.

== Other uses ==
The tune of "J'attendrai" served a Yiddish song sung in Auschwitz "Komm zu mir".

The intro of "J'attendrai" is also heard in a sleeping quarters of the underground barracks of Fort Eben-Emael, Belgium. The room shows visitors what sleeping quarters of regular soldiers looked like in 1940, when Belgium was attacked by Nazi-Germany.

The song was used in a television commercial for French car manufacturer Renault in 2005.

The song was also used in the novel Love From Paris by Alexandra Potter, to signify the love between two characters.

In Pierre Assouline's WWII novel Lutetia, the "J'attendrai" is sung defiantly by political prisoners held by the Nazis at the Cherche-Midi prison in Paris.

In the 1981 Oscar nominated German movie Das Boot, "J'attendrai" was the U-Boat Captain's favorite song and was played as the U-Boat was sailing home to its homeport, where tragedy awaited.

== Charts ==
Dalida version
Chart (1976)	Peak position
France (IFOP)	1
France (CIDD)	1
Wallonia	1
Quebec	2
Flanders	4
Netherlands	9

== See also ==
- "J'attends un navire"
