= Dino Olivieri =

Italian composer (1905–1963)

Dino Olivieri (December 5, 1905 - January 24, 1963), was an Italian composer of light music and conductor. He is most well known for his composition of the music for the 1936 song Tornerai (lyrics by Nino Rastelli); now more famously known as J'attendrai (Musiker and Musiker, 2014, p. 2001).
