= Salma Ya Salama (song) =

1918 folkloric song and 1977 single by Dalida

Song by Dalida

from the album Salma ya salama
- Released: October 6, 1977
- Recorded: 1976–1977
- Studio: CBE
- Genre: World; chanson
- Length: 3:08 (ar); 3:03 (fr)
- Label: International Shows
- Composers: Sayed Darwish; Jeff Barnel
- Lyricists: Salah Jahin (ar); Pierre Delanoë (fr)
- Producer: Orlando

Music video
- "Salma Ya Salama" on YouTube

"Salma Ya Salama" (Arabic: سالمة يا سلامة) is a song by Dalida from 1976, based on the original 1918 song by Sayed Darwish. The track became one of the singer's biggest hits and a remix, released in 1997, was certified silver in France.

It was among the first ethnic fusion hits in the world, recorded in five languages: Arabic, French, German, Italian ("Uomo di sabbia") and Spanish. The French version speaks of a man wandering in the desert and sees a mirage of a garden paradise.

== Release and reception ==
First recorded fully in Arabic as a reviving of a 1918 song by Egyptian composer Sayed Darwish, which sought to bring hope back to Egyptians after the violence of the 1919 Revolution. With lyrics by Badi' Khayri, it achieved big success upon its release thus it was later translated to French and released in France in 1977. Both versions are featured on eponymous album by Dalida released the same year, which contains several other hits.

The 45 rpm single was released in two different pressings: the French version (IS 45730) coupled with "Ti amo" (originally by Umberto Tozzi) and the Arabic version (IS 45731) coupled with the instrumental version. The disc was distributed by Sonopresse. When Dalida signed with Carrere in 1978, a third 45 rpm pressing (CA 49354) was made.

The song was then translated into Italian and German.

Dalida remixes

In 1995, Orlando (brother of Dalida, producer and French record label owner) released two completely re-orchestrated versions of the "Salma Ya Salama" in its album release Comme si j'étais là... one in French and the other in an Arabic version (both offered as a bonus).

The song was remixed again in late 1996 for the Dalida album L'an 2005 and as a CD single. This version, released in May 1997, was certified silver having reached the French Top 20 chart. A clip was made for the occasion.

== Charts ==
Year	Country	Peak position	Units sold	Certifications
1977	France	6	+ 300,000	Silver
1997	France	14	+ 125,000	Silver
1977	Wallonia	3	-	-

== Other versions ==
"Salma Ya Salama" has been performed by many other artists, such as Haifa Wehbe, Alabina, Chantal Chamandy, Jean Michel Jarre, Giota Lydia, Ziynet Sali, Krum & Miro, Mika, WAMA and Tiziana Rivale. It was also sung by Atilla Taş as "Sallana Sallana" for his debut album Kırmızılım (Turkish for "My red") in 1998. A version of it has also been performed by the Greek singer Marinella with the name "Pali Berdeftika". it feauted 2003 Hindi film Plan as Pyaar Aaya.

== Appearances ==
The song is used in the soundtrack of 1996 French film Pédale douce directed by Gabriel Aghion.
