= Il venait d'avoir 18 ans =

Song by Dalida

from the album Julien
- A-side: "Gigi l'amoroso"
- Released: 1973
- Recorded: 1973
- Studio: Davout
- Genre: Chanson; sentimental ballad
- Length: 2:57
- Label: International Shows
- Composer(s): Pascal Auriat; Jean Bouchéty
- Lyricist(s): Pascal Sevran; Serge Lebrail
- Producer(s): Orlando

"Il venait d'avoir 18 ans" (pronounced [il vənɛ davwaʁ diz‿ɥit‿ɑ̃]; "He had just turned 18") is a French-language song by singer Dalida, first released on album Julien in the second half of 1973. The song was a success and has become one of Dalida's signature tracks.

In 1974, Dalida released the song on the B-side of her single "Gigi l'amoroso".

The song, which reached the 13th place in the German charts and 33rd place in the Italian charts, won the Prize of the Academy of the French Record in 1975, and was later recorded in five languages (German, Spanish, Italian, Japanese and English), benefiting from an exit single for each of them.

== History ==
This song evokes Dalida's secret relationship, at 34 years old, with a 22-year-old Italian student. At that time, she got pregnant and chose to have an abortion, but the operation made her sterile. It is this tragedy which inspired her to sing about an impossible relationship. The lyrics of the song reference love for young people felt by mature women. They also mention the film Le Blé en herbe, inspired by Colette's 1923 novel of the same title.

Dalida also recorded the song in Italian under the title "18 anni"/"Diciott'anni".

== Track listings ==
7-inch single Sonopresse IS 45 716 (1974, France)
7-inch single Omega OM 39.058 Y (1974, Belgium)
7-inch single Omega OM 39.058 (1974, Netherlands)
7-inch single Poplandia P-30573 (1974, Spain)
CD single Barclay 9240 (1999, France)

A. "Gigi l'amoroso (Gigi l'amour)" (6:59)
B. "Il venait d'avoir 18 ans" (2:50)

7-inch EP Zip Zip 10.057/E (1974, Portugal)

A. "Gigi l'amoroso (Gigi l'amour)" (6:59)
B1. "Vado via" (3:40)
B2. "Il venait d'avoir 18 ans" (2:50)

== Charts ==
Chart (1974)	Peak position
Flanders	33
Wallonia	4
Italy	33
Germany	13
Quebec	3
France	127
