= List of songs recorded by Dalida =

Songs by Italian-French singer

Dalida songs
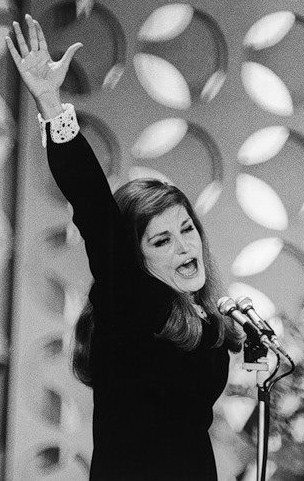
- Dalida during Sanremo Music Festival in January 1967
- Total: 696
- French: 439
- Italian: 125
- German: 60
- Spanish: 32
- English: 22
- Arabic: 7
- Japanese: 4
- Flemish: 2
- Hebrew: 1
- Bilingual songs: 5

This is an alphabetical list of all the songs known to have been recorded in studio by Dalida between 1954 and 1987. The list contains a total of 696 songs in 9 different languages. (Note: French, Italian, German, Spanish, English, Arabic, Japanese, Flemish and Hebrew.)

All songs were released during or after Dalida's lifetime, either on vinyl or CD or as a music video on TV or DVD, except 2 songs (Note: In Italian: Lasciami stare; Questa è la mia terra) that didn't receive any public broadcast or release, but are internet leaked unofficially.

From all songs first released on vinyl, all of them have been eventually digitally remastered and released on CD, except 16 songs. (Note: In German: Am Tag als der Regen kam (version 1980, ?); Manuel; Salma ya salama; Darla dirladada; Die Strasse des Lebens; Doch einer spielt Akkordeon; In Spanish: Al escuchar mi acordeón; Cada instante; El aniversario; Las cosas del amor (?); Mi querido señor; Todos morimos a los veinte; Y amor, y amor; In Italian: Giustina; No dico no (unremastered version issued on CD); Viva la pappa)

All songs are organised by language and type, with brackets containing a date of first release. The songs which were first released posthumously since 1987 have two dates; first indicating the year of creation and second the year of release.

The list also has an extension with 18 songs that are not counted (as studio recordings) because they were either sang live and never recorded in studio for commercial release, or short advertisement soundtracks.

== French ==
=== A ===
- À chacun sa chance (1964)
- À chaque fois j'y crois (1977)
- À ma chance (1962)
- À ma manière (1980)
- À qui? (1967)
- Aba daba honeymoon (1983)
- Achète-moi un juke-box (1962)
- Adieu monsieur mon amour (1958)
- Adonis (1959)
- Ah! quelle merveille (1963)
- Aime-moi (1956)
- Aïe! mon cœur (1958)
- Allô... tu m'entends? (1964)
- Americana (1981)
- Amor, amor (1976)
- Amore scusami (1964)
- Amoureuse de la vie (1977)
- Amstramgram (1959)
- Anima mia (1974)
- Avant de te connaître (1970)
- Avec le temps (1971)
- Avec une poignée de terre (1961)
- Ay! mourir pour toi (1957)

=== B ===
- Baisse un peu la radio (1966)
- Ballade à temps perdu (1969)
- Bambino (1956)
- Bésame Mucho (1976)
- Bientôt (1963)
- Bras dessus, bras dessous (1960)
- Bravo (1983)
- Buenas noches mi amor (1957)
- Bye bye (1982)

=== C ===
- C'est irréparable (1965)
- C'est mieux comme ça (a.k.a. Le Parrain 2; 1975)
- C'est un jour à Naples (1960)
- C'est ça l'amore (1959)
- C'était mon ami (1985)
- Ça me fait rêver (feat. Bruno Guillain; 1978)
- Calypso italiano (1957)
- Captain Sky (1977)
- Ce coin de terre (1963)
- Ce serait dommage (1959)
- Chanter les voix (1972)
- Chanteur des années 80 (1980)
- Chaque instant de chaque jour (1964)
- Chez moi (1963)
- Ciao amore ciao (1967)
- Ciao, ciao bambina (1959)
- Ciao ciao mon amour (1961)
- Comme au premier jour (1960)
- Comme disait Mistinguett (1979)
- Comme si tu revenais d'un long voyage (1977)
- Comme si tu étais là (1977)
- Comme toi (1979)
- Comme tu dois avoir froid (1974)
- Comme une symphonie (1961)
- Comment faire pour oublier (1971)
- Comment l'oublier (1982)
- Concerto pour une voix (a.k.a. Chaque nuit; 1970)
- Confidences sur la fréquence (duet with Antoine; 1982)
- Cordoba (1961)

=== D ===
- Dans la ville endormie (1968)
- Dans le bleu du ciel bleu (1958)
- Dans les rues de Bahia (1960)
- Dans ma chambre (1966)
- Darla dirladada (1970)
- De Grenade à Séville (1960)
- Dédié à toi (1979)
- Depuis qu'il vient chez nous (1979)
- Des gens qu'on aimerait connaître (1974)
- Des millions de larmes (1959)
- Deux colombes (1969)
- Diable de temps (1970)
- Dieu seul (1958)
- Ding ding (1963)
- Dis-moi des mots (1969)
- Dix mille bulles bleues (1961)
- Douce nuit, sainte nuit (1960)

=== E ===
- Eh! ben (1956)
- Elle, lui et l'autre (duet with Bob Calfati; 1959)
- Ensemble (1982)
- Entre les lignes entre les mots (1970)
- Entrez sans frapper (1967)
- Et de l'amour... de l'amour (duet with St. Germain; 1975)
- Et la vie continuera (1981)
- Et pourtant j'ai froid (1969)
- Et puis c'est toi (1972)
- Et tous ces regards (1977)
- Et... et... (1966)
- Eux (1963)

=== F ===
- Fado (1956)
- Femme (1983)
- Femme est la nuit (1977)
- Fini, la comédie (1981)
- Flamenco bleu (1956)

=== G ===
- Garde-moi la dernière danse (1961)
- Génération 78 (feat. Bruno Guillain; 1978)
- Gigi in paradisco (1980)
- Gigi l'amoroso (1974)
- Gitane (1956)
- Gondolier (1957)
- Guitare et tambourin (1959)
- Guitare flamenco (1956)

=== H ===
- Héléna (1958)
- Hey, love (1970)
- Histoire d'aimer (1977)
- Histoire d'un amour (1957)

=== I ===
- Il faut danser reggae (1979)
- Il faut du temps (1972)
- Il pleut sur Bruxelles (1981)
- Il silenzio (a.k.a. Bonsoir mon amour; 1965)
- Il venait d'avoir 18 ans (1973)
- Il y a toujours une chanson (1977)
- Ils ont changé ma chanson (1970)
- Ils sont partis (1964)
- Inconnu mon amour (1958)
- Itsi bitsi, petit bikini (1960)

=== J ===
- J'ai décidé de vivre (1967)
- J'ai rêvé (1959)
- J'aime (1983)
- J'attendrai (1975)
- J'aurais voulu danser (1982)
- J'écoute chanter la brise (1957)
- J'm'appelle amnésie (1981)
- Je crois mon cœur (1966)
- Je l'attends (1962)
- Je m'endors dans tes bras (1968)
- Je me repose (1968)
- Je me sens vivre (1961)
- Je n'ai jamais pu t'oublier (1964)
- Je ne dirai ni oui ni non (1965)
- Je ne peux pas me passer de toi (1962)
- Je ne sais plus (1964)
- Je pars (1958)
- Je préfère naturellement (1966)
- Je reviens te chercher (1967)
- Je suis malade (1973)
- Je suis toutes les femmes (1980)
- Je t'aime (1964)
- Je t'appelle encore (1966)
- Je te tendrai les bras (1959)
- Jesus bambino (1971)
- Jesus kitsch (1972)
- Jouez bouzouki (1982)
- Julien (1973)
- Justine (1975)

=== K ===
- Kalimba de luna (1984)

=== L ===
- Loin dans le temps (1967)
- Loin de moi (1961)
- Loop de loop (feat. the Play Boys; 1963)
- Lucas (1983)
- Luna caprese (1959)

==== L' ====
- L'amour chante (1958)
- L'amour et moi (1981)
- L'amour qui venait du froid (1972)
- L'amour à la une (1976)
- L'an 2005 (1969)
- L'anniversaire (1969)
- L'arlequin de Tolède (1960)
- L'innamorata (1984)

==== La ====
- La bambola (1968)
- La banda (1967)
- La chanson d'Orphée (1959)
- La chanson de Yohann (1967)
- La chanson du Mundial (1982)
- La consultation (1974)
- La danse de Zorba (1965)
- La danse de Zorba (1986)
- La Féria (1981)
- La fille aux pieds nus (1959)
- La joie d'aimer (1961)
- La leçon de Twist (1962)
- La mer (1976)
- La montagne (1958)
- Là où je t'aime (1984)
- La partie de football (1963)
- La pensione bianca (1984)
- La petite maison bleue (1968)
- La plus belle du monde (a.k.a. Maman, la plus belle du monde; 1957)
- La rose que j'aimais (1971)
- La Sainte Totoche (1965)
- La valse des vacances (1964)
- La vie en rose (1965)
- La vie en rose (1976)
- Là, il a dit (1963)
- Lady d'Arbanville (1970)
- Lazzarella (1957)

==== Le ====
- Le bonheur (1960)
- Le cha cha cha (1963)
- Le ciel bleu (1962)
- Le clan des Siciliens (1969)
- Le fermier (1971)
- Le flamenco (1965)
- Le jour du retour (1963)
- Le jour le plus long (1962)
- Le jour où la pluie viendra (1957)
- Le jour où la pluie viendra (1982)
- Le Lambeth Walk (1978)
- Le petit Gonzales (1962)
- Le petit bonheur (1976)
- Le petit chemin de pierre (1957)
- Le petit clair de lune (1960)
- Le petit perroquet (1968)
- Le premier amour du monde (1983)
- Le printemps sur la colline (1965)
- Le ranch de Maria (1957)
- Le restaurant italien (1983)
- Le sable de l'amour (1969)
- Le septième jour (1968)
- Le sixième jour (1986)
- Le slow de ma vie (1981)
- Le soleil et la montagne (1965)
- Le temps d'aimer (1985)
- Le temps de mon père (1973)
- Le temps des fleurs (1968)
- Le torrent (1956)
- Le Vénitien de Levallois (1985)
- Le vent n'a pas de mémoire (1969)
- Le visage de l'amour (1986)

==== Les ====
- Les anges noirs (1968)
- Les choses de l'amour (1972)
- Les clefs de l'amour (1977)
- Les couleurs de l'amour (1969)
- Les enfants du Pirée (1960)
- Les feuilles mortes (1976)
- Les gens sont fous (1967)
- Les Gitans (1958)
- Les grilles de ma maison (1967)
- Les hommes de ma vie (1986)
- Les jardins de Marmara (1970)
- Les marrons chauds (1961)
- Les nuits sans toi (1965)
- Les p'tits mots (1983)
- Les violons de mon pays (1969)
- Les yeux de mon amour (1958)

=== M ===
- Ma mère me disait (1969)
- Ma mélo mélodie (1972)
- Ma vie je la chante (1974)
- Madona (1956)
- Maintenant (1958)
- Mais il y a l'accordéon (1973)
- Mama (1967)
- Mama Caraïbo (1986)
- Maman (1976)
- Mamina (1972)
- Manuel (1974)
- Manuel Benitez "El Cordobés" (1966)
- Manuella (1968)
- Marchand de fruits (1958)
- Marie Madeleine (1983)
- Marie, Marie (1959)
- Marina (1959)
- Marjolaine (1981)
- Mein lieber Herr (1975)
- Mélodie perdue (1958)
- Mélodie pour un amour (1959)
- Mes frères (1959)
- Mi carinito (1962)
- Miguel (1957)
- Modesty (1966)
- Mon Italie (1984)
- Mon amour oublié (1960)
- Mon cœur est fou (1967)
- Mon cœur va (1956)
- Mon frère le soleil (1970)
- Mon petit bonhomme (1975)
- Monday, Tuesday... Laissez-moi danser (1979)
- Monsieur l'amour (1971)
- Mourir sur scène (1983)

=== N ===
- Nake-di, nake-dou (1969)
- Ne joue pas (1959)
- Ne lis pas cette lettre (1964)
- Ne lui dis pas (1975)
- Ne reviens pas mon amour (1967)
- Ne t'en fais pas pour ça (1964)
- Ni chaud, ni froid (1960)
- Non (1971)
- Non, ce n'est pas pour moi (1973)
- Nostalgie (1981)
- Notre façon de vivre (1977)
- Nous sommes tous morts à 20 ans (1975)
- Noël blanc (1960)
- Nuits d'Espagne (1961)

=== O ===
- Ô Seigneur Dieu pourquoi m'as-tu abandonné? (1973)
- Oh! la la (1957)

=== P ===
- Papa achète-moi un mari (1963)
- Parce que je ne t'aime plus (1986)
- Pardon (1957)
- Parle plus bas (a.k.a. Le Parrain; 1972)
- Parlez-moi d'amour (1961)
- Parle-moi d'amour, mon amour (1976)
- Parlez-moi de lui (1966)
- Paroles... paroles... (duet with Alain Delon; 1973)
- Pars (1968)
- Partir ou mourir (1981)
- Pauvre cœur (1967)
- Pépé (1961)
- Petit Papa Noël (1960)
- Petit homme (1966)
- Petit éléphant twist (1962)
- Piccolissima serenata (a.k.a. Du moment qu'on s'aime; 1958)
- Pilou pilou pilou hé (1960)
- Plus loin que la terre (1961)
- Por favor (1956)
- Pourquoi (1960)
- Pour en arriver là (1984)
- Pour garder (1957)
- Pour ne pas vivre seul (1972)
- Pour qui pour quoi (1970)
- Pour te dire je t'aime (1984)
- Pour toi Louis (1982)
- Pour un homme (1982)
- Pour vous (1982)
- Problemorama (feat. Bruno Guillain; 1979)
- Protégez-moi Seigneur (1961)

=== Q ===
- Quand je n'aime plus, je m'en vais (1981)
- Quand on n'a que l'amour (1957)
- Quand on n'a que l'amour (1979)
- Quand revient l'été (1963)
- Quand s'arrêtent les violons (1978)
- Quand tu dors près de moi (a.k.a. Aimez-vous Brahms?; 1961)
- Que la vie était jolie (1963)
- Que reste-t-il de nos amours (1972)
- Que sont devenues les fleurs? (1962)
- Quelques larmes de pluie (1968)

=== R ===
- Ram dam dam (1970)
- Raphaël (1975)
- Remember... c'était loin (feat. St. Germain; 1977)
- Rendez-vous au Lavandou (1958)
- Reste encore avec moi (1961)
- Reviens-moi (1985)
- Rien qu'un homme de plus (1973)
- Rio do Brasil (1980)
- Romantica (1960)

=== S ===
- S'aimer (1983)
- S'endormir comme d'habitude (1960)
- Salma ya salama (1977)
- Salut salaud (1986)
- Scandale dans la famille (1965)
- Scusami (1957)
- Sèche vite tes larmes (1969)
- Seule avec moi (1974)
- Si c'était à refaire (1970)
- Si j'avais des millions (1968)
- Si je pouvais revivre un jour ma vie (1958)
- Si la France (1982)
- Si tu me téléphones (1962)
- Sois heureux (1963)
- Soleil (1984)
- Soleil d'un nouveau monde (1973)
- Son chapeau (1965)

=== T ===
- T'aimer follement (1960)
- T'aimerai toujours (1962)
- Ta femme (1974)
- Tables séparées (1977)
- Tant d'amours du printemps (1964)
- Téléphonez-moi (1983)
- Tesoro mío (1957)
- Ti amo (1977)
- Tico Tico (1976)
- Timide sérénade (1958)
- Tipitipiti (1970)
- Tire l'aiguille (1968)
- Toi mon amour (1967)
- Toi pardonne-moi (1966)
- Toi tu me plais (1962)
- Ton prénom dans mon cœur (1983)
- Tout au plus (1971)
- Tout l'amour (1959)
- Tout le monde a sa chanson d'amour (1968)
- Tout le monde sait (1968)
- Tout se termine (1965)
- Toutes ces heures loin de toi (1984)
- Toutes les femmes du monde (1971)
- Toutes les nuits (1963)
- Tu croiras (1963)
- Tu m'as déclaré l'amour (1976)
- Tu m'étais destiné (1958)
- Tu me voles (1965)
- Tu n'as pas mérité (1965)
- Tu n'as pas très bon caractère (1957)
- Tu ne sais pas (1961)
- Tu peux le prendre (1961)
- Tu peux tout faire de moi (1957)
- Tzigane (1968)

=== U ===
- Un enfant (1965)
- Un tendre amour (1966)
- Une femme à quarante ans (1981)
- Une jeunesse (1970)
- Une vie (1971)
- Une vie d'homme (1984)

=== V ===
- Va petite étoile (1960)
- Va va va (1979)
- Vado via (1973)
- Vieni vieni si... (1960)
- Vingt quatre mille baisers (a.k.a. 24 mille baisers; 1961)
- Viva la pappa (1965)
- Vive le vent (1960)
- Voilà pourquoi je chante (1978)
- Voyage sans bagages (1977)

=== Z ===
- Zoum zoum zoum (1969)

=== Recorded for TV series ===
Unlike the previous songs of the list, the songs listed below were recorded in studio specifically for Dalida's appearances in musical TV series, and one for soundtrack of comedy TV series "L'auberge de la Licorne" in which she did not appear.

Solo

- Bahia (1983)
- Comme disait Mistinguett (1974)
- Donne moi (Emission "L'auberge de la Licorne"; 1966)
- Gosse de Paris (1960)
- Le spectacle est fini (1974)
- Diamants (1974)
- Les gars de la marine (1980)
- Quand allons-nous nous marier? (1981)

Duet

- Hello Dali (with Petula Clark; 1978)
- Les p'tites femmes de Paris (with Mireille Mathieu; 1981)
- Les choses de l'amour (with Petula Clark; 1972)
- Phi phi (with Ginette Garcin; 1971)
- Prendre le thé à deux (with Dave; 1979)
- Quand on s'aime (with Charles Aznavour; 1967)
- Rock and roll tango (with Johnny Hallyday; 1969)
- The peanut vendor (with Annie Cordy; 1978)
- Tochi Wan (with Jean-Marie Proslier; 1976)

Quartet

- Alouette (with Mireille Mathieu, Nana Mouskouri and Chantal Goya; 1981)
- Les Anthropophages (with Serge Gainsbourg, Petula Clark and Claude François; 1972)

=== Posthumously released ===
Songs below were unreleased during Dalida's lifetime.

- A deux nous deux (circa 1969/2012)
- J'ai ta main (1964/1991)
- Je sortirai sans toi (a.k.a. La morale de l'histoire; 1966/2012)
- Je t'aime ça veut dire aime-moi (circa 1972/1989)
- Je te perds (1966/1991)
- Je vais partir (1963/2012)
- La mamma (1964/1996)
- Le bonheur vient me dire bonjour (1960/1991)
- Le jour du retour (feat. male voice; 1963/2012)
- Rendez-vous chaque soir (1966/1989)
- Sa grande passion (1961/1991)
- Ton âme (1969 or 1972/1991)
- Un soir qu'on oublie pas (1978/1989)
- Va plus loin que le temps (1966 or 1970/1991)

==== Unfinished ====
Dalida recorded 5 demos or sketches that eventually remained unfinished and unreleased during her life. "Ma vie", "Mesdames, messieurs…" and "Solitude" were posthumously compiled and released as one song titled "Chansons inachevées" in 1989.

- C'est facile avec toi (1959 or 1960/2012)
- Ma vie (1974)
- Mesdames, messieurs… (1974)
- Quand tu n'es pas là (1959/2012)
- Solitude (1970)

== Italian ==
- 18 anni (1974)
- 24 mila baci (1961)
- Amare per vivere (1968)
- Amo (1967)
- Amo l'amore (1968)
- Aranjuez la tua voce (1967)
- Arlecchino (1970)
- Ascoltami (1965)
- Bang bang (1966)
- C'è gente che incontri per strada (1974)
- Cammina, cammina (1972)
- Casatchok (1969)
- Che mai farò (1962)
- Chi mai lo sa (1962)
- Chiudi il ballo con me (1961)
- Ci sono fiori (1970)
- Ciao amore ciao (1967)
- Ciao come stai (1976)
- Col tempo (1972)
- Cominciamo ad amarci (1965)
- Comprami un juke-box (1962)
- Credo nell'amore (1972)
- Cuore matto (1967)
- Dan dan dan (1968)
- Danza (1982)
- Darla dirladada (1970)
- Devo imparare (1965)
- El Cordobes (1966)
- Entrate amici miei (1968)
- Flamenco (1966)
- Gigi l'amoroso (1974)
- Giustina (1974)
- Gli inesorabili (1961)
- Gli zingari (1959)
- Harlem spagnolo (1961)
- Il colori dell'amore (1970)
- Il mio male sei (1966)
- Il piccolo amore (1976)
- Il silenzio (1965)
- Il sole muore (1967)
- Il venditore di felicità (1960)
- Jesus kitsch (1972)
- L'acqua viva (1960)
- L'amore mio per te (1971)
- L'aquilone (1968)
- L'arlecchino gitano (1960)
- L'ora dell'amore (1968)
- L'ultimo valzer (1967)
- La canzone di Orfeo (1960)
- La colpa è tua (1971)
- La danza di Zorba (1965)
- La mia vita è una giostra (1970)
- La pioggia cadrà (1959)
- La speranza è una stanza (1968)
- La strada dei sogni (1961)
- Lacrime e pioggia (1968)
- Lady d'Arbanville (1970)
- Le parole di ogni giorno (1984)
- Le promesse d'amore (1968)
- Lei, lei (1973)
- Ma melo mélodia (1972)
- Mama (1967)
- Mamy Blue (1971)
- Manuel (1974)
- Mediterraneo (1984)
- Milord (1960)
- Nel 2023 (1970)
- No dico no (1962)
- Non è più la mia canzone (1970)
- Non è casa mia (1967)
- Non giocarti dell'amore (1960)
- Non lo sai (1962)
- Non mi dire chi sei (1961)
- Non ti pentire mai (1964)
- 'O sole mio (1960)
- Oh Lady Mary (1970)
- Pensiamoci ogni sera (1966)
- Pepe (1962)
- Per non vivere soli (1973)
- Pezzettini di bikini (1960)
- Piccolo elefante (1962)
- Piccolo ragazzo (1967)
- Pozzanghere (1961)
- Prigioniera (1971)
- Quando Tu dormirai (1962)
- Quelli erano giorni (1968)
- Questo amore è per sempre (1965)
- Remember (1977)
- Scoubidou (1960)
- Sei Solo un uomo in più (1973)
- Semplicemente cosi (1986)
- Sola È più che mai (1967)
- Son tornata da te (1968)
- Stelle di cielo, stelle di mare (1970)
- Stivaletti rossi (1967)
- T'amerò dolcemente (1960)
- Tony (1982)
- Tornerai (1975)
- Tua moglie (1974)
- Twistin’ the twist (1962)
- Un grosso scandalo (1965)
- Un po' d'amore (1968)
- Uno a te, uno a me (1960)
- Uomo di sabbia (1977)
- Un uomo vivo (1961)
- Va da lei (1966)
- Vedrai, vedrai (1979)
- Viva la pappa (1965)

=== Recorded for TV series ===
The songs below, unlike the previous ones on the list, were recorded in studio specifically for Dalida's appearances in musical TV series.

- Aria di Parigi (duet with Alberto Lupo for "Partitissima"; 1967)
- Carnaby Street (duet with Patty Pravo for "Partitissima"; 1967)
- La prima cosa bella (duet with Massimo Ranieri; 1971)

=== Posthumously released ===
Songs below were unreleased during Dalida's lifetime.

- Amore scusami (1964/1991)
- Aveva un cuore grande come te (1970/1989)
- Dolce musica (1959/1991)
- Loro (1963/1991)
- La nostra bimba (1970/1991)
- La prima cosa bella (1970/1991)
- Non andare via (1970/1987)
- Piove (Ciao, ciao bambina) (1959/1991)
- Poderoso signore (1961/1991)
- Quando nasce un nuovo amore (1983/1991)
- Va tu sei libero (1964/1991)
- Voglio che nessuno sappia mai (1964/2007)

=== Unreleased ===
These songs are known to have been recorded by Dalida, and have leaked online, but were never officially released.

- Lasciami stare (a.k.a. Domani tu ti sposerai; 1963)
- Questa è la mia terra (1963)

== German ==
- Abschiedsmelodie (1965)
- Am Tag als der Regen kam (1959)
- Am Tag als der Regen kam (1980)
- Am Tag als der Regen kam (1982)
- An jenem Tag... (1968)
- Äpfel und Birnen (a.k.a. Scoubidou; 1959)
- Buenas noches mi amor (1960)
- Buona sera phantasie (1983)
- Captain Sky (1976)
- Ciao amore ciao (1967)
- Darla dirladada (1970)
- Das lied vom clown (1962)
- Der charme der kleinen worte (1983)
- Der Joe hat mir das Herz gestohlen (1961)
- Die Schlüssel der Liebe (1976)
- Die Strasse des Lebens (1961)
- Doch einer spielt Akkordeon (1975)
- Du bist gegangen (1962)
- Ein Schiff wird kommen (a.k.a. Das Mädchen von Piräus; 1960)
- El Cordobez (1966)
- Er war gerade 18 Jahr (1974)
- Gigi der Geliebte (1974)
- Glaub an mich (1960)
- Grau war der Ozean (1962)
- Hello Boy (1962)
- Ich war ein Narr (1962)
- Ich werde warten (1964)
- Komm zurück (1975)
- Komm, Senorita, komm (a.k.a. Estramadore; 1960)
- Lieber kleiner Mann (1975)
- Mama (1967)
- Manuel (1975)
- Mein blauer Luftballon (1961)
- Mein lieber Herr (1975)
- Melodie aus alter Zeit (1959)
- Melodie poesie (1961)
- Milord (1960)
- Mon chérie (1971)
- Nein, Zärtlich bist du nicht (1984)
- Nie (1966)
- Orfeo (1960)
- Parlez-moi d'amour (1961)
- Pepe (1960)
- Petruschka (1969)
- Regenzeit-Tränenleid (1968)
- Romantica (1960)
- Rosen im Dezember (1962)
- Salma ya salama (1977)
- So verrückt (1961)
- Spiel balalaika (1971)
- Tschau tschau Bambina (1959)
- Um nicht allein zu sein (1973)
- Was wird mein Charly tun? (1962)
- Weit übers Meer (1969)
- Wenn die Soldaten (1964)
- Worte, nur Worte (duet with Friedrich Schütter; 1973)
- Worte, nur Worte (duet with Harald Juhnke; 1984)
- Ya Ya Twist (1962)

=== Posthumously released ===
Songs below were unreleased during Dalida's lifetime.

- Hab mich lieb (1958/2008)
- Ich fand ein Herz in Portofino (1959/2008)

== Spanish ==
- Al escuchar mi acordeón (1974)
- Amore scusami (1964)
- Aquella rosa (1961)
- Baños de luna (1960)
- Cada instante (1964)
- Dos (1969)
- El aniversario (1969)
- Manuel Benitez "El Cordobés" (1966)
- El restaurante italiano (1986)
- El silencio (1966)
- Gigi el amoroso (1974)
- Háblame de amor (1961)
- Hay que bailar reggae (1986)
- Io t’amerò (a.k.a. Yo te amo; 1986)
- Las cosas del amor (1975)
- Las palabras corrientes (1986)
- Los niños del Pireo (1960)
- Mi querido señor (1975)
- Morir cantando (1986)
- No es el adios (1961)
- No me puedo quejar (1961)
- Por el teléfono (1986)
- Por no vivir a solas (1974)
- Si el amor se acaba me voy (1982)
- Soleil mi sol (1986)
- Tenia dieciocho años (1974)
- Todos morimos a los veinte (1975)
- Tu nombre (1986)
- Volverás (1976)
- Y amor, y amor (1975)
- Zum, zum, zum (1969)

=== Posthumously released ===
The song below was unreleased during Dalida's lifetime.

- Déjame bailar (1979/1992)

== English ==
- Alabama song (1980)
- Born to sing (1984)
- For the first time (1959)
- The great Gigi l'amoroso (1982)
- He must have been eighteen (1979)
- If only I could live my life again (1959)
- Italian restaurant (1984)
- Kalimba de luna (1984)
- Let me dance tonight (1979)
- Little words (1984)
- Money, money (1980)
- Never on Sunday (1960)
- The Gypsies (1959)
- The Lambeth Walk (1979)
- Willingly (1959)

=== Posthumously released ===
Songs below were unreleased during Dalida's lifetime.

- Dance my troubles away (1965/2009)
- Good bye my love (1965/2009)
- Milord (1960/2009)
- Orfeo (1960/2009)
- Say no more it's goodbye (1961/2009)
- Tintarella di luna (1960/2009)
- You (1963/2009)

== Arabic ==
Egyptian

- Aghani aghani (1982; Arabic: أغانى أغانى)
- Ahsan nass (1985; Arabic: أحسن ناس)
- Gamil el soura (1983; Arabic: جميل الصوره)
- Helwa ya baladi (1979; Arabic: حلوه يا بلدى)
- Salma ya salama (1977; Arabic: سالمه يا سلامه)
- Fattan Ya Leil Fattan (film "L'Or du Nil - Le Masque de Toutankhamon"; 1954/2021; Arabic: فتان يا ليل)

Lebanese

- Lebnane (1986/1989; Arabic: لبنان)

== Japanese ==
- Amore scusami (1964)
- Gigi l'amoroso (1974)
- Juuhassai no kare (1974)
- 'O sole mio (1964)

== Flemish ==
- Ik zing amore (1959)
- Speel niet met m'n hart (1959)

== Hebrew ==
- Hene ma tov (1965)

== Bilingual songs ==
French-Hebrew

- Hava naguila (a.k.a. Dansons mon amour; 1959; Hebrew: הבה נגילה)

French-Italian

- Come prima (a.k.a. Tu me donnes; 1958)
- Love in Portofino (1959)
- Ho trovato la felicità (1960/2007)

French-Spanish

- La violetera (1956)

== Other ==
=== Advertisement soundtracks ===
Although they are recorded in studio, they are not counted as recorded songs as they are jingles.

- Adaptation of Gigi l'amoroso (Air freshener "Wizard sec"; 1986)
- Untitled (Orange juice "Bali"; 1976)

=== Songs ===
Below are listed 16 songs that are known to be performed by Dalida during a concert, film, TV or radio appearance in period from 1954 to 1987. They have never been recorded in studio, thus are not counted as songs recorded for release. Eventually some of them were released as music video or on albums.

French

- Croquemitoufle (radio emission "Dans le vent"; 1964)
- Enfants de tous pays (TV with fr:Alice Donna and Yves Lecoq; 1985)
- Il reviendra (film "L'Inconnue de Hong Kong", with it:Tania Béryl; 1963)
- Je n'ai pas changé (TV with Yves Lecoq; 1985)
- La parisienne (TV with Alice Donna; 1985)
- Le plus beau tango du monde (Tino Rossi posthoumous TV show; 1983)
- Le soir (TV with Line Renaud; 1983)
- Rues de mon Paris (film "fr:L'inconnue de Hong Kong", with Serge Gainsbourg; 1963)
- Toi c'est pas pareil (TV with Serge Lama; 1977)
- Tous les garcons et les filles (radio emission "Casino Parade"; 1983)
- Une fille pleurait (concert for radio emission "Musicorama"; 1961)

French-Egyptian

- Ya Mustafa (concert; circa 1984)

Greek

- Ta Pedia tou Pirea (Greek: Τα Παιδιά του Πειραιά; live Greek TV show "Apópse mazí mas" 1977)

Italian

- Ciao devo andare (Italian TV show "Senza rete" with Little Tony; 1970)
- Desiderio di un’ora (film "Sigara wa kass"; 1954)
- La nostra serata (Italian TV show "Senza rete" with Gianni Morandi; 1971)
