= Gigi l'amoroso =

Single by Dalida

from the album Manuel
- Language: French
- B-side: "Il venait d'avoir 18 ans"
- Released: 18 January 1974
- Recorded: 1973
- Studio: Des Dames, Paris
- Genre: Chanson
- Length: 7:29
- Label: International Shows
- Composers: Lana & Paul Sebastian
- Lyricist: Michaële
- Producer: Orlando

Dalida singles chronology
"Julien" (1973)	"Gigi l'amoroso" (1974)	"Anima mia" (1974)

"Gigi l'amoroso" (old-fashioned Italian for 'Gigi the lover') is a song recorded by French Italian singer Dalida. It was written by Michaële, Lana and Paul Sebastian. The song was released as a single in January 1974 with the song "Il venait d'avoir 18 ans" on the B-side.

The song was first performed by Dalida in January during a concert at the Olympia Hall. The song has a duration of seven minutes and was not suitable for radio rotation, nevertheless it became a big hit, rising to the top of the charts in Europe. The song became number one in Switzerland and Flemish Belgium, where it also became the most popular song of the year. Billboard magazine named Dalida the most popular French singer of 1974 in the world thanks to the recording of this song.

== Track listings ==
7-inch single Sonopresse IS 45 716 (1974, France)
7-inch single Omega OM 39.058 Y (1974, Belgium)
7-inch single Omega OM 39.058 (1974, Netherlands)
7-inch single Poplandia P-30573 (1974, Spain)
CD single Barclay 9240 (1999, France)

A. "Gigi l'amoroso (Gigi l'amour)" (6:59)
B. "Il venait d'avoir 18 ans" (2:50)

7-inch single Fragola Blu FB 1703 (1974, Italy)

A. "Gigi l'amoroso (Gigi l'amour)" (7:45)
B. "Col tempo" (4:29)

7-inch EP Zip Zip 10.057/E (1974, Portugal)

A. "Gigi l'amoroso (Gigi l'amour)" (6:59)
B1. "Vado via" (3:40)
B2. "Il venait d'avoir 18 ans" (2:50)

== Charts ==
=== Weekly charts ===
Weekly chart performance for "Gigi l'amoroso"
Chart (1974)	Peak position
Belgium (Ultratop 50 Flanders)	1
Belgium (Ultratop 50 Wallonia)	4
Netherlands (Dutch Top 40)	2
Netherlands (Single Top 100)	2
Spanish Singles Chart	2
Switzerland (Schweizer Hitparade)	1

=== Year-end charts ===
Year-end chart performance for "Gigi l'amoroso"
Chart (1974)	Position
Belgium (Ultratop Flanders)	1
Netherlands (Dutch Top 40)	7
Netherlands (Single Top 100)	8
Switzerland (Schweizer Hitparade)	5

== Certifications and sales ==
Certifications for "Gigi l'amoroso"
Region	Certification	Certified units/sales
Canada (Music Canada)	Gold	75,000^{^}
^{^} Shipments figures based on certification alone.

== Other-language versions ==
- Dalida also recorded the song in Italian (under the same title "Gigi l'amoroso"), in Spanish as "Gigi el amoroso", in German as "Gigi der Geliebte", in English as "The Great Gigi l'Amoroso" (or just "The Great Gigi"), and in Japanese as "Ai suru Jiji" (愛するジジ).
- Belgian band The Strangers recorded it in Dutch as "Scheele Vanderlinden".
- Belgian singer Wendy Van Wanten also recorded a Dutch version.
- Dutch singer Mike Vincent used the melody for a song called "Friet met Mayonaise" ("Fries with Mayonnaise"), which was later covered by Johnny Hoes.
- Swiss singer Ines Torelli used the melody for a song called "Gigi von Arosa" (Swiss German: "Gigi vo Arosa")
- Bulgarian singer Emil Dimitrov used the melody for a song called "Hubavata Gigi" ("Bella Gigi", cyrillic - "Хубавата Джиджи"), then the song is covered by several Bulgarian band and singers.

== Use in torture ==
Chilean general Augusto Pinochet reportedly used this song alongside physical torture on his prisoners.
