= Sonopresse =

French record label and distribution company

Sonopresse is a French record label and distribution company founded in 1958. It was acquired by EMI in 1977. The label released records for Electric Light Orchestra and Kate Bush in France. Sonopresse reported $11 million in sales and 15% of the French record distribution market in 1971.
