= Orlando Productions =

French record label

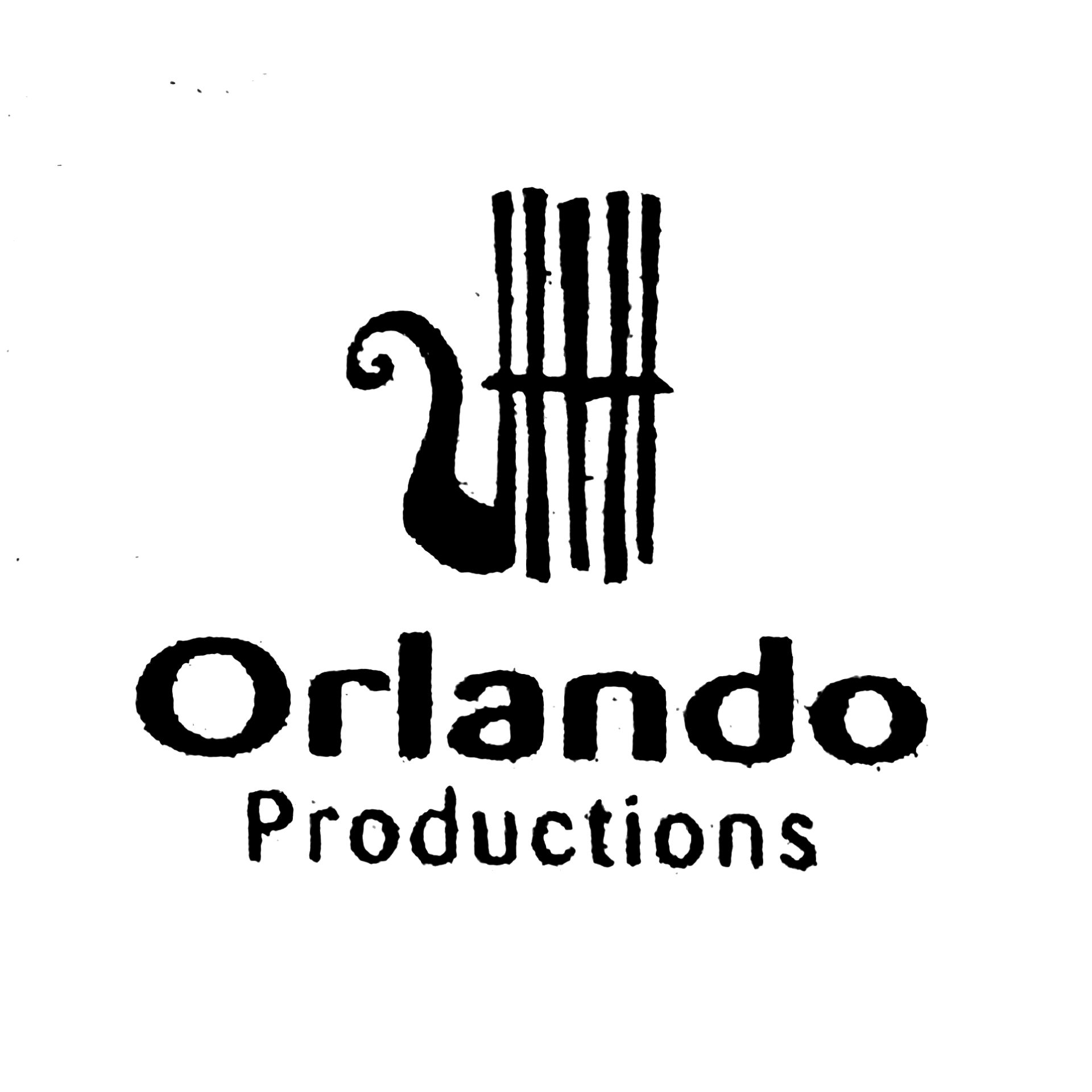
- Founded: 1970; 56 years ago
- Founder: Orlando
- Status: Active
- Distributor: Universal Music
- Genre: Various
- Country of origin: France
- Location: Paris, France
- Official website: Contact page of Orlando Productions

Orlando Productions is a French record label, owned by Bruno Gigliotti, brother of singer Dalida, for whom he used to be the manager. In the late 1960s, he founded the Orlando label as a vehicle to release and to control Dalida's musical output.

== History ==
Dalida was an Egyptian-Italian and later French singer. Like many other French artists, Dalida used to be under contract at Barclay Records, owned by producer and composer Eddie Barclay. Bruno Gigliotti worked as an art director at the label, before founding Orlando Productions.

Orlando's own record label carried several names, such as International Show and Orlando International Show (sometimes the plural of 'show' was used). The label was distributed by Sonopresse in France, and by other companies in the rest of Europe (such as Omega International/Dureco in the Benelux and RCA Victor in Italy).

From 1970, the Orlando International Show(s) produced recordings from Dalida. After her death in 1987, Orlando continued to control her record releases, mostly re-issues, greatest hits anthologies and live recordings.

In the late 1990s, the Orlando label was renamed BG Productions. It also released works by other French artists, such as Hélène Ségara since 1996, Indra since 1990 and Cerena since 2003. In 2011, Bruno received the Chevalier de l'ordre des Arts et des Lettres from French culture minister Frédéric Mitterrand.

== Main artists ==
- Dalida (1970–1987, although Orlando produced several anthologies thereafter)
- Hélène Ségara (since 1996)
- Indra (since 1990)
- Les Vagabonds (1990–1995)
- Melody (1989–1992)
- Frédéric Chateau (in his band Koeurs (1983–1986), as a solo artist (1988–1993))
- Cerena (since 2003)
