= List of rock and roll artists =

The following is a list of rock and roll artists.

== List ==
- Richard Anthony
- Chet Atkins
- Hank Ballard
- The Beatles
- Chuck Berry
- The Big Bopper
- The Brian Setzer Orchestra
- Johnny Burnette
- Ray Campi
- Freddy Cannon
- Goree Carter
- Johnny Cash
- Cui Jian
- Adriano Celentano
- Ray Charles
- Chubby Checker
- Eddie Cochran
- The Crickets
- Dick Dale
- Bobby Darin
- Bo Diddley
- Fats Domino
- Bill Doggett
- Drive-By Truckers
- Duane Eddy
- The Everly Brothers
- Adam Faith
- Billy Fury
- Danyel Gérard
- Gerry and the Pacemakers
- Rosco Gordon
- Bill Haley
- Arch Hall Jr.
- Roy Hall
- Johnny Hallyday
- The Head Cat
- Buddy Holly
- Ike & Tina Turner
- Wanda Jackson
- Shooter Jennings
- Johnny Kidd
- B.B. King
- Kings of Rhythm ("Jackie Brenston and his Delta Cats")
- Peter Kraus
- Freddie 'Fingers' Lee
- Ricky Nelson
- Little Richard
- Little Tony
- Brenda Lee
- Jerry Lee Lewis
- Mina
- Roy Orbison
- Paul Revere and the Raiders
- Carl Perkins
- Phantom, Rocker & Slick
- Elvis Presley
- Cliff Richard
- The Rolling Stones
- Jack Scott
- Screamin' Jay Hawkins
- Bob Seger
- The Shadows
- Del Shannon
- Jumpin' Gene Simmons
- Howie Stange
- Tommy Steele
- Stray Cats
- Sister Rosetta Tharpe
- Big Joe Turner
- Conway Twitty
- Ritchie Valens
- Bobby Vee
- Gene Vincent
- Marty Wilde
- Hank Williams Jr.
- Larry Williams
- Johnny Winter
- Sheb Wooley
- Link Wray

== See also ==
- List of country music performers
- List of mainstream rock performers
- List of popular music performers
- List of rockabilly musicians

== Bibliography ==
- Bradley, Dick (1992). Understanding Rock 'n' Roll: Popular Music in Britain 1955-1964. Open University Press. ISBN 978-0-33509-754-8.
- Perone, James E. (2009). Mods, Rockers, and the Music of the British Invasion. Praeger. ISBN 978-0-275-99860-8.
- Kouvarou, Maria (2015). "American Rock with a European Twist: The Institutionalization of Rock'n'Roll in France, West Germany, Greece, and Italy (20th Century)". Historia Crítica (57): 75–94. doi:10.7440/histcrit57.2015.05. hdl:1992/29052. ISSN 0121-1617.
