= Connie McBooker =

- Also known as: Connie Mack Booker
- Occupation: Musician
- Labels: Freedom Recording Co., Eddie's Records, RPM Records
- Formerly of: Connie Mack Booker And His Orchestra, Conney's Combo

Connie McBooker was an American blues pianist based in Houston, Texas, United States. McBooker worked with such artists as B.B. King, Hank Ballard, Junior Parker, Cal Green, and L.C. Williams.

== Background ==
It appears that McBooker was the go-to pianist for backing big name artists who recorded in Houston. The list includes B.B. King, Junior Parker, Bobby Bland and Johnny Copeland. However, he did record for himself on the Eddie’s, Freedom, Sittin’ in With and RPM labels between 1949 and 1953.

Most of his work was as a session performer, but he also had some solo works, most notably "Shout Baby Boogie."

== Career ==
Working with Eddie Green, McBooker recorded "Short Baby Boogie" bw "Rich Women Blues". Both of the compositions were by L.C. Williams. Credited to Connie McBooker Pianist and Eddie Green Drummer, the recordings were issued on Eddie's 1928 in 1949.

=== "Shout Baby Shout", "Ethel Mae" ===
Booker and L.C. Williams recorded "Shout Baby Shout" which was originally released in 1949 single on the Eddie's label. It was also released as "Shout Baby Shout" bw "Ethel Mae" on Freedom Recording Co. 1517. It was credited to L.C. Williams with Conney's Combo. "Shout Baby Shout" did well in New York where it was in the WHOM Top Ten. It was also a National R&B hit. It peaked at No. 8 nationally on the Billboard R&B chart.

"Shout Baby Boogie" would end up on two compilation albums. One was Boogie Woogie Blues of the 1940s and 1950s, which also had songs by, among others, Lightnin' Hopkins and Professor Longhair. The other is The Real Blues Brothers, which was sold throughout the world, but did especially well in Germany. The title was inspired by the 1980 movie The Blues Brothers, which starred Dan Aykroyd and John Belushi.

=== Further activities ===
Working with Donald Cooks, Connie Mack Booker was the credited vocalist on the song, "Trouble Making Woman" which was the B side of "Dolphin Street Stop" which was released on Jade 202 in 1950 and credited to Donald Cooks and his Band.

It was reported in the 19 September 1953 issue of The Billboard that Connie Mac Booker had been signed to RPM Records. This took place when Joe Bihari of Modern Records had a three-week tour through America's Mid-West.

Booker recorded "Love Me Pretty Baby" and "All Alone". Credited to Connie Mack Booker and His Orchestra, the songs were released on RPM 401 in early January 1954.

== Death ==
McBooker is presumed dead, but no one has been able to confirm this.
