= Billboard (disambiguation) =

Billboard is a large outdoor sign usually used for advertising.

Billboard may also refer to:

== Arts and entertainment ==
- Billboard (magazine), a music and entertainment media brand
  - Billboard charts, inspired by the magazine
  - Billboard Music Award, sponsored by the magazine
- Billboard Türkiye, official Turkish chart magazine founded in 2006
- Billboard, a large film poster called a "Twenty four sheet"
- "Billboard", an episode of the sitcom Malcolm in the Middle
- Billboard, television ident for BBC Two used in 1992, from the 1991-2001 series of idents
- Three Billboards Outside Ebbing, Missouri, 2017 crime drama film

== Other uses ==
- The Billboard, a massive granite monolith in West Antarctica
- Billboarding, a 3D computer graphics technique when sprites are always facing the viewer

== See also ==
- Billboard antenna, an array of parallel antennas with flat reflectors
