= Ethel Mae =

Single by L.C. Williams with Conney's Combo
- A-side: "Shout Baby Shout"
- B-side: "Ethel Mae"
- Released: 1949
- Length: 2:50
- Label: Freedom Recording Co. 1517
- Composer: L. C. Williams

"Ethel Mae" is a song by L.C. Williams. It was released on the Freedom Recording Co. label in 1949 and became a hit on the United States R&B charts.

== Background ==
The song was composed by L.C. Williams. He recorded it with the backing by Conney's Combo. Credited to L. C. Williams with Conney's Combo, it was released in 78 RPM format on Freedom Recording Co. 1517 in 1949. "Shout Baby Shout" was originally the A side with "Ethel Mae" on the flip side. But by the time it was reviewed in September that year, "Ethel Mae" was referred to as the A side.

"Shout Baby Shout" is mentioned in Julie Miliner's book, The Sharecropper's Daughter.

The "Well sung blues" single would turn out to be the greatest success for the Freedom Recording Co. label.

== Reception ==
The record had a glowing review in the 24 September 1949 issue of The Cash Box with the reviewer saying that song would catch on like wildfire, and it was the kind of stuff that blues fans went for, and it couldn't miss.

== Airplay ==
For the week of 8 October, "Ethel Mae" was at No. 6 at WHOM in New York. For the week of 12 November, the record was at No. 4 at WHOM in New York. The record was still on the WHOM chart for the week of 3 December.

== Charts ==
=== The Cash Box ===
==== Hot in Other Cities ====
For the week of 24 September, "Ethel Mae" was at No. 8 on the Pittsburgh section of the Hot in Other Cities chart. For the week of 22 October, the single was at No. 9 on the Louisville chart and No. 5 on the Pittsburgh chart. For the week of 29 October, the single was at No. 7 on the Memphis chart. For the week of 5 November, the single was at No. 8 on the San Antonio chart. For the week of 10 December, the single was at No. 2 in Dallas. For the week of 17 December, the single was at No. 9 in Birmingham.

==== Hot in Harlem ====
For the week of 8 October, the single was at No. 8 on the Hot in Harlem chart. For the week of 15 October, "Ethel Mae" reached its peak position of No. 6 on the Hot in Harlem chart. It held that position for another week.

=== The Billboard ===
==== Most-Played Juke Box Rhythm & Blues Records ====
For the week of 8 October 1949, "Ethel Mae" debuted at No. 8 on The Billboard Most-Played Juke Box Rhythm & Blues Records chart which was its peak position during its three-week run.

==== Best-Selling Retail Rhythm & Blues Records ====
As shown in the 22 October issue of The Billboard, "Ethel Mae" made its debut at No. 12 in the Best-Selling Retail Rhythm & Blues Records chart for the week ending 14 October which was its peak position during its one-week run.

==== MusicVF ====
The single's national peak position is given as No. 8 for the Billboard R&B chart at MusicVF.com.
