= Rock and roll =

Genre of popular music

Rock and Roll
- Stylistic origins: Rhythm and blues; country; gospel; honky-tonk; electric blues; boogie-woogie; folk; jazz; western swing; jump blues
- Cultural origins: Late 1940s – early 1950s, United States
- Derivative forms: Rock; beat; pop; surf; Rockabilly; Garage rock; Punk rock; Instrumental rock; British rock and roll

Regional scenes
- American South, United Kingdom, American West Coast

Other topics
- Origins of rock and roll; list of artists; African-American music; Rockabilly

Rock and roll (Note: Often written as rock & roll, rock-n-roll, R&R, R'n'R or rock 'n' roll) is a genre of popular music that evolved in the United States during the late 1940s and early 1950s. The origins of rock and roll are rooted in a blending of African-American musical genres, mainly rhythm and blues, with stylistic influences from gospel, jazz, boogie-woogie, electric blues, jump blues, swing, and folk music. While rock and roll's early elements can be heard in blues records from the 1920s and in country records of the 1930s, the genre did not acquire its name until 1954.

By the mid-1960s, rock and roll had developed into "the more encompassing international style known as rock music, though the latter also continued to be known in many circles as rock and roll". For the purposes of differentiation, this article deals with the first definition.

In the earliest rock and roll styles, either the piano or saxophone was typically the lead instrument. These instruments were generally replaced or supplemented by the electric guitar in the mid-to-late 1950s. The beat is essentially a dance rhythm with an accentuated backbeat, almost always provided by a snare drum. Minimal blues chord progressions such as the twelve-bar blues are commonly used. Classic rock and roll is usually played with one or more electric guitars (one lead, one rhythm) and a double bass (string bass). After the mid-1950s, electric bass guitars (first mass-produced by Fender in the early 1950s) and drum kits became popular in classic rock.

Rock and roll had a profound influence on contemporary American lifestyles, fashion, attitudes, and language, and is often portrayed in movies, fan magazines, and on television. According to G.C. Altschuler the music had a positive influence on the civil rights movement because of its widespread appeal to both Black American and White American teenagers.

== Etymology ==
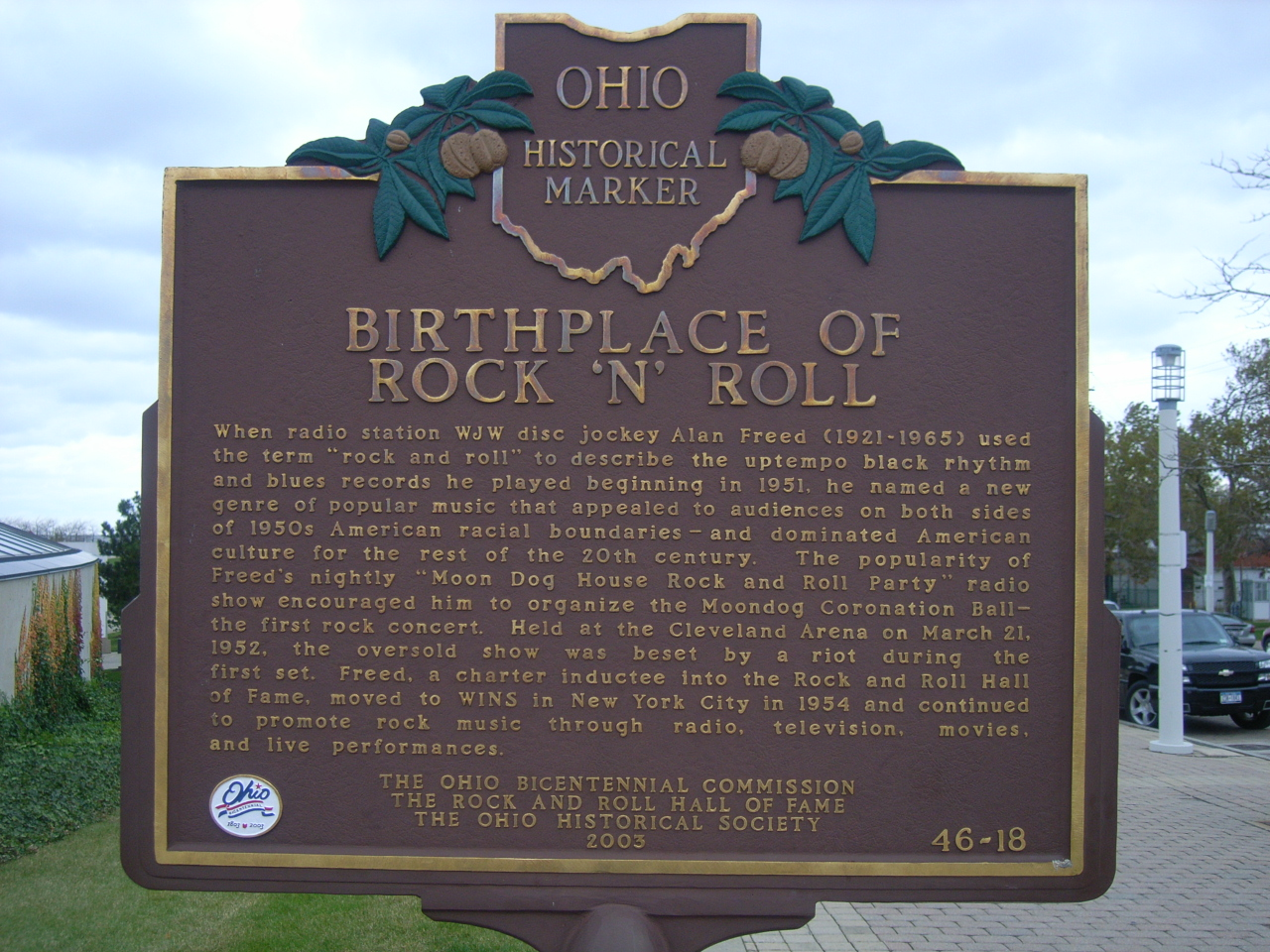
Sign commemorating the role of Alan Freed and Cleveland, Ohio, in the origins of rock and roll

The term "rock and roll" is defined by Greg Kot in Encyclopædia Britannica as the music that originated in the mid-1950s and later developed "into the more encompassing international style known as rock music". The term is sometimes also used as synonymous with "rock music" and is defined as such in some dictionaries.

The words rock and roll had become associated in the late eighteenth century, when "Rock and Roll" brimstone (i.e. sulfur) was advertised; rock brimstone being the naturally-occurring form and roll brimstone being in the form of sticks or blocks, made by allowing liquid sulfur to solidify in (esp. cylindrical) moulds. The phrase "rocking and rolling" originally described the movement of a ship on the ocean, but by the early 20th century was used both to describe the spiritual fervor of black church rituals and as a sexual analogy. A retired Welsh seaman named William Fender can be heard singing the phrase "rock and roll" when describing a sexual encounter in his performance of the traditional song "The Baffled Knight" to the folklorist James Madison Carpenter in the early 1930s, which he would have learned at sea in the 1800s; the recording can be heard on the Vaughan Williams Memorial Library website.

Various gospel, blues and swing recordings used the phrase before it became widely popular. "Bosom of Abraham", an African-American spiritual that was documented no later than 1867 (just after the Civil War), uses the phrase "rock my soul" frequently in a religious sense; this song was later recorded by musicians from various genres, including various gospel musicians and groups (including The Jordanaires), Louis Armstrong (jazz/swing), Lonnie Donegan (skiffle), and Elvis Presley (rock and roll/pop/country). Blues singer Trixie Smith recorded "My Man Rocks Me with One Steady Roll" in 1922. It was used in 1940s recordings and reviews of what became known as "rhythm and blues" music aimed at a black audience. Huey "Piano" Smith credits Cha Cha Hogan, a jump-blues shouter and comic in New Orleans, with popularizing the term in his 1950 song "My Walking Baby".

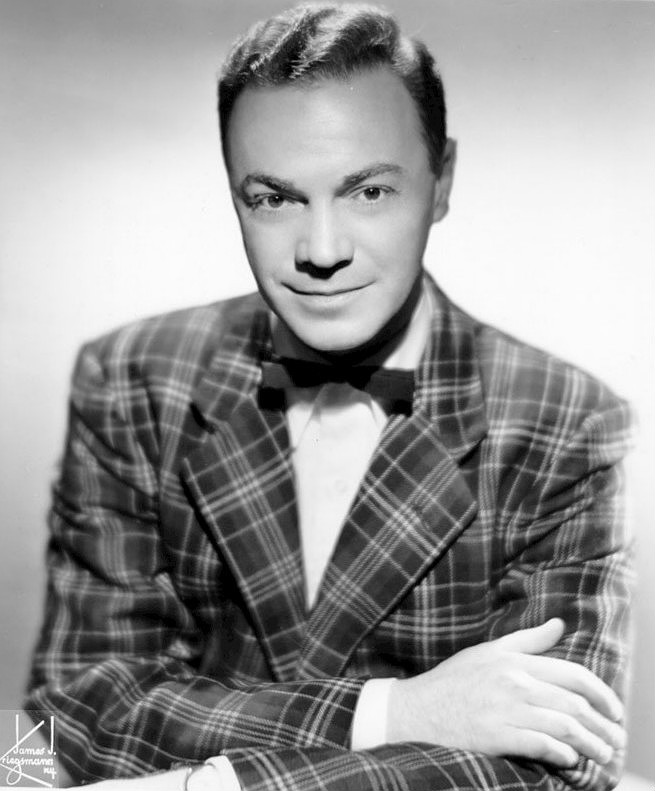
Disc jockey Alan Freed is credited with popularizing the term "rock and roll" and introducing the genre across racial barriers in the 1950s

In 1934, the song "Rock and Roll" by the Boswell Sisters appeared in the film Transatlantic Merry-Go-Round. In 1942, before the concept of rock and roll had been defined, Billboard magazine columnist Maurie Orodenker started to use the term to describe upbeat recordings such as "Rock Me" by Sister Rosetta Tharpe; her style on that recording was described as "rock-and-roll spiritual singing". By 1943, the "Rock and Roll Inn" in South Merchantville, New Jersey, was established as a music venue. In 1951, Cleveland, Ohio, disc jockey Alan Freed began playing this music style, and referring to it as "rock and roll" on his mainstream radio program, which popularized the phrase.

Several sources suggest that Freed found the term, used as a synonym for sexual intercourse, on the record "Sixty Minute Man" by Billy Ward and his Dominoes. The lyrics include the line, "I rock 'em, roll 'em all night long". Freed did not acknowledge the suggestion about that source in interviews, and explained the term as follows: "Rock 'n roll is really swing with a modern name. It began on the levees and plantations, took in folk songs, and features blues and rhythm".

In discussing Alan Freed's contribution to the genre, two significant sources emphasized the importance of African-American rhythm and blues. Greg Harris, then the executive director of the Rock n Roll Hall of Fame, offered this comment to CNN: "Freed's role in breaking down racial barriers in American pop culture in the 1950s, by leading white and black kids to listen to the same music, put the radio personality 'at the vanguard' and made him 'a really important figure'". After Freed was honored with a star on the Hollywood Walk of Fame, the organization's Web site offered this comment: "He became internationally known for promoting African-American rhythm and blues music on the radio in the United States and Europe under the name of rock and roll".

Not often acknowledged in the history of rock and roll, Todd Storz, the owner of radio station KOWH in Omaha, Nebraska, was the first to adopt the Top 40 format (in 1953), playing only the most popular records in rotation. His station, and the numerous others which adopted the concept, helped to promote the genre: by the mid 50s, the playlist included artists such as "Presley, Lewis, Haley, Berry and Domino".

== Early rock and roll ==
=== Origins ===
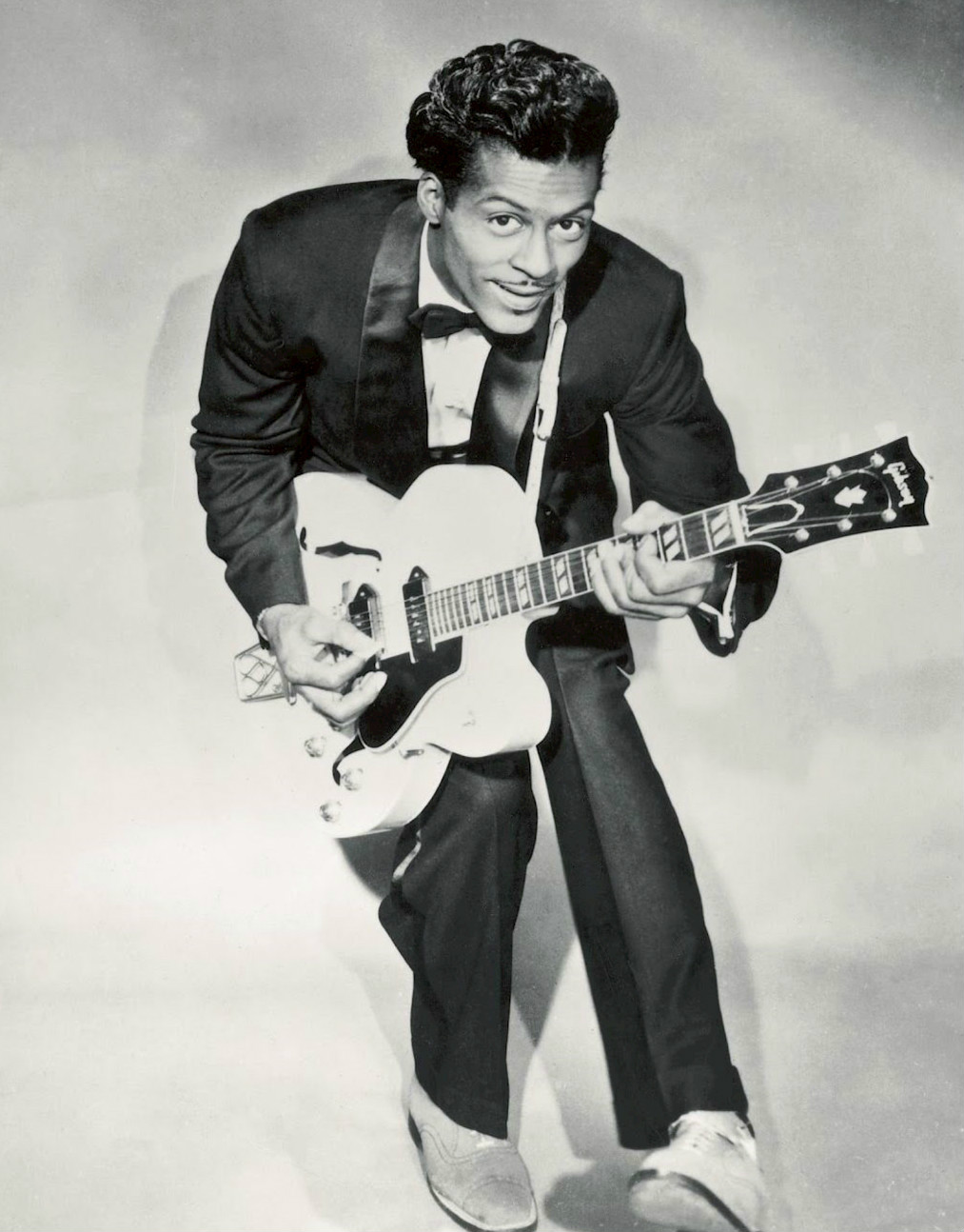
Chuck Berry in 1958

While the history has been subject to debate, modern scholarship increasingly centers the genre as a direct descendant of the black experience in the American South and the urban centers of the North. At its core, rock and roll is the electrification and acceleration of African-American musical traditions. While European instrumentation provided the physical tools; the rhythm, structure, and soul of the genre were forged in the black community. The migration of many former slaves and their descendants to major urban centers such as St. Louis, Memphis, New York City, Detroit, Chicago, Cleveland, and Buffalo meant that black and white residents were living in close proximity in larger numbers than ever before. Radio stations that made white and black forms of music available to both groups, the development and spread of the gramophone record, and African-American musical styles such as jazz and swing which were taken up by white musicians, aided this process of "cultural collision".

The immediate roots of rock and roll lay in the rhythm and blues, then called "race music", in combination with either boogie-woogie and shouting gospel or with country music of the 1940s and 1950s. Particularly significant influences were jazz, blues, gospel, country, and folk. Commentators differ in their views of which of these forms were most important and the degree to which the new music was a re-branding of African-American rhythm and blues for a white market, or a new hybrid of black and white forms.

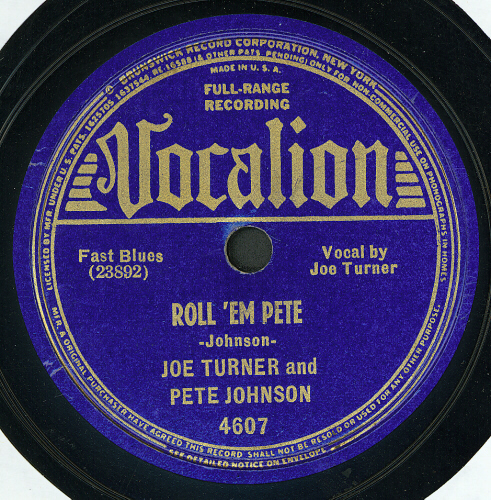
Big Joe Turner and Pete Johnson's record "Roll 'Em Pete" is regarded as a precursor to rock and roll.

In the 1930s, jazz, and particularly swing, both in urban-based dance bands and blues-influenced country swing were among the first music to present African-American sounds for a predominantly white audience. One particularly noteworthy example of a jazz song with recognizably rock and roll elements is Big Joe Turner with pianist Pete Johnson's 1938 single "Roll 'Em Pete", which is regarded as an important precursor of rock and roll. The 1940s saw the increased use of blaring horns (including saxophones), shouted lyrics and boogie-woogie beats in jazz-based music. During and immediately after World War II, with shortages of fuel and limitations on audiences and available personnel, large jazz bands were less economical and tended to be replaced by smaller combos, using guitars, bass and drums. In the same period, particularly on the West Coast and in the Midwest, the development of jump blues, with its guitar riffs, prominent beats and shouted lyrics, prefigured many later developments. In the documentary film Hail! Hail! Rock 'n' Roll, Keith Richards proposes that Chuck Berry developed his brand of rock and roll by transposing the familiar two-note lead line of jump blues piano directly to the electric guitar, creating what is instantly recognizable as rock guitar. This proposal by Richards neglects the black guitarists who did the same thing before Berry, such as Goree Carter, Gatemouth Brown, and the originator of the style, T-Bone Walker. Country boogie and Chicago electric blues supplied many of the elements that would be seen as characteristic of rock and roll. Inspired by electric blues, Chuck Berry introduced an aggressive guitar sound to rock and roll, and established the electric guitar as its centerpiece, adapting his rock band instrumentation from the basic blues band instrumentation of a lead guitar, second chord instrument, bass and drums. In 2017, Robert Christgau declared that "Chuck Berry did in fact invent rock 'n' roll", explaining that this artist "came the closest of any single figure to being the one who put all the essential pieces together".

Rock and roll arrived at a time of considerable technological change, soon after the development of the electric guitar, amplifier, 45 rpm record and modern condenser microphones. There were also changes in the record industry, with the rise of independent labels like Atlantic, Sun and Chess servicing niche audiences and a similar rise of radio stations that played their music. It was the realization that relatively affluent white teenagers were listening to this music that led to the development of what was to be defined as rock and roll as a distinct genre. Because the development of rock and roll was an evolutionary process, no single record can be identified as unambiguously "the first" rock and roll record. Contenders for the title of "first rock and roll record" include Sister Rosetta Tharpe's "Strange Things Happening Every Day" (1944), "That's All Right" by Arthur Crudup (1946), "Move It On Over" by Hank Williams (1947), "The Fat Man" by Fats Domino (1949), Goree Carter's "Rock Awhile" (1949), and Jimmy Preston's "Rock the Joint" (1949) (later covered by Bill Haley & His Comets in 1952).

"Rocket 88" by Jackie Brenston and his Delta Cats (Ike Turner and his band The Kings of Rhythm and sung by Brenston), was recorded by Sam Phillips in March 1951. This is often cited as the first rock n' roll record. In an interview however, Ike Turner offered this comment: "I don't think that 'Rocket 88' is rock 'n' roll. I think that 'Rocket 88' is R&B, but I think 'Rocket 88' is the cause of rock and roll existing".

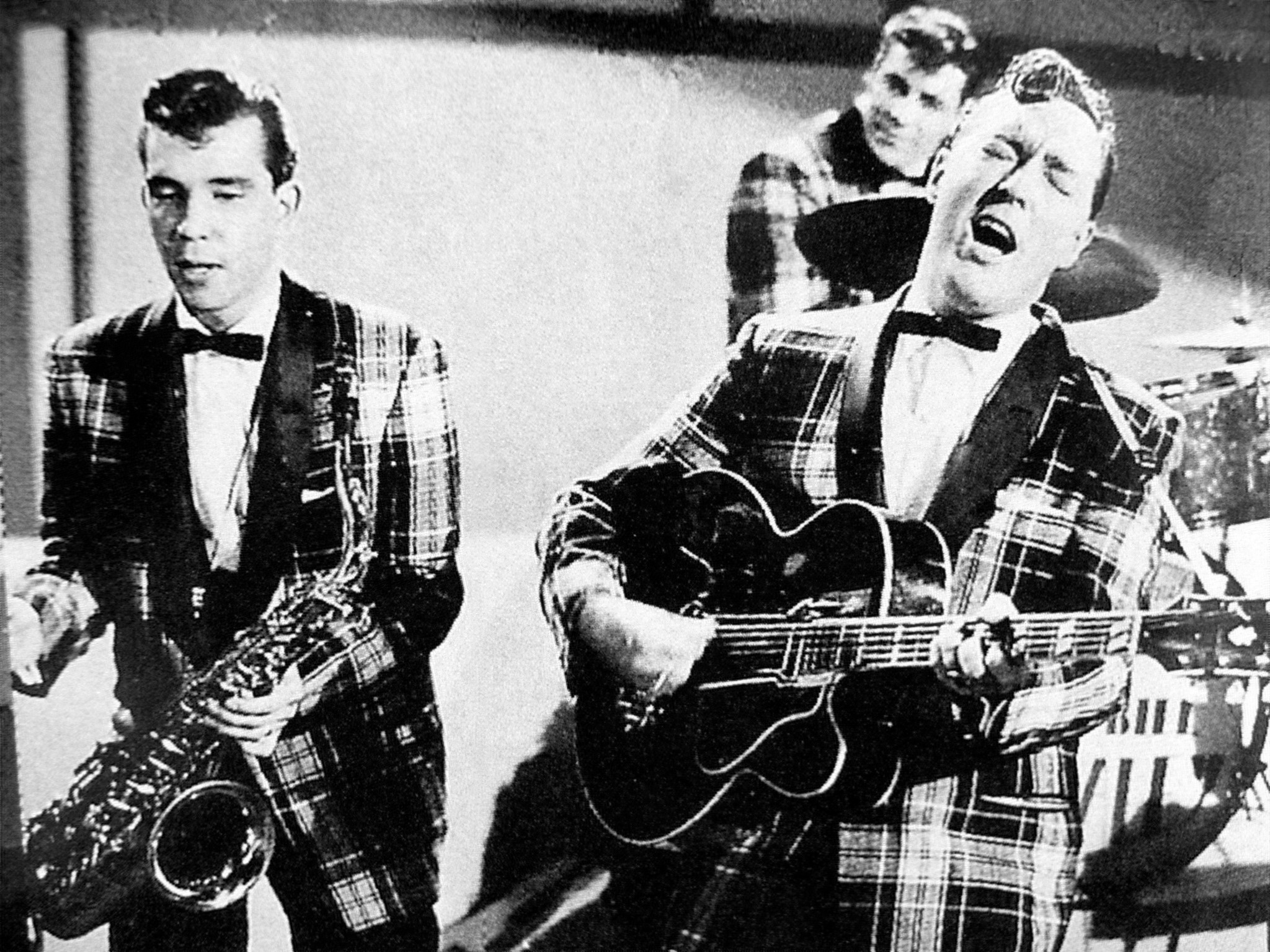
Bill Haley and his Comets performing in the 1954 Universal International film Round Up of Rhythm

In terms of its wide cultural impact across society in the US and elsewhere, Bill Haley's "Rock Around the Clock", recorded in April 1954 but not a commercial success until the following year, is generally recognized as an important milestone, but it was preceded by many recordings from earlier decades in which elements of rock and roll can be clearly discerned.

Journalist Alexis Petridis argued that neither Haley's "Rock Around the Clock" nor Presley's version of "That's Alright Mama" heralded a new genre: "They were simply the first white artists' interpretations of a sound already well-established by black musicians almost a decade before. It was a raucous, driving, unnamed variant of rhythm and blues that came complete with lyrics that talked about rocking".

Other artists with early rock and roll hits included Chuck Berry, Bo Diddley, Little Richard, Jerry Lee Lewis, and Gene Vincent. Chuck Berry's 1955 classic "Maybellene" in particular features a distorted electric guitar solo with warm overtones created by his small valve amplifier. However, the use of distortion was predated by electric blues guitarists such as Joe Hill Louis, Guitar Slim, Willie Johnson of Howlin' Wolf's band, and Pat Hare; the latter two also made use of distorted power chords in the early 1950s. Also in 1955, Bo Diddley introduced the "Bo Diddley beat" and a unique electric guitar style, influenced by African and Afro-Cuban music and in turn influencing many later artists.

=== Rhythm and blues ===
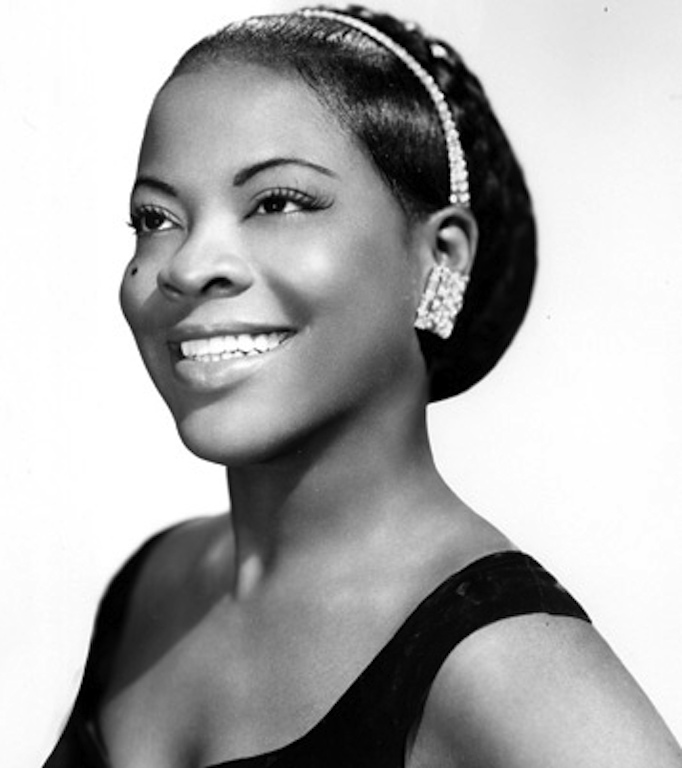
LaVern Baker was an R&B singer who was influential on rock and roll

Rock and roll was strongly influenced by R&B, according to many sources, including an article in The Wall Street Journal in 1985, titled, "Rock! It's Still Rhythm and Blues". In fact, the author stated that the "two terms were used interchangeably", until about 1957. The other sources quoted in the article said that rock and roll combined R&B with pop and country music.

Fats Domino was one of the biggest stars of rock and roll in the early 1950s and he was not convinced that this was a new genre. In 1957, he said: "What they call rock 'n' roll now is rhythm and blues. I've been playing it for 15 years in New Orleans". According to Rolling Stone, "this is a valid statement ... all Fifties rockers, black and white, country born and city-bred, were fundamentally influenced by R&B, the black popular music of the late Forties and early Fifties". Further, Little Richard built his ground-breaking sound of the same era with an uptempo blend of boogie-woogie, New Orleans rhythm and blues, and the soul and fervor of gospel music vocalization.

Less frequently cited as an influencer, LaVern Baker was inducted into the Rock and Roll Hall of Fame in 1991. The Hall remarked that her "fiery fusion of blues, jazz and R&B showcased her alluring vocals and set the stage for the rock and roll surge of the Fifties".

=== Rockabilly ===
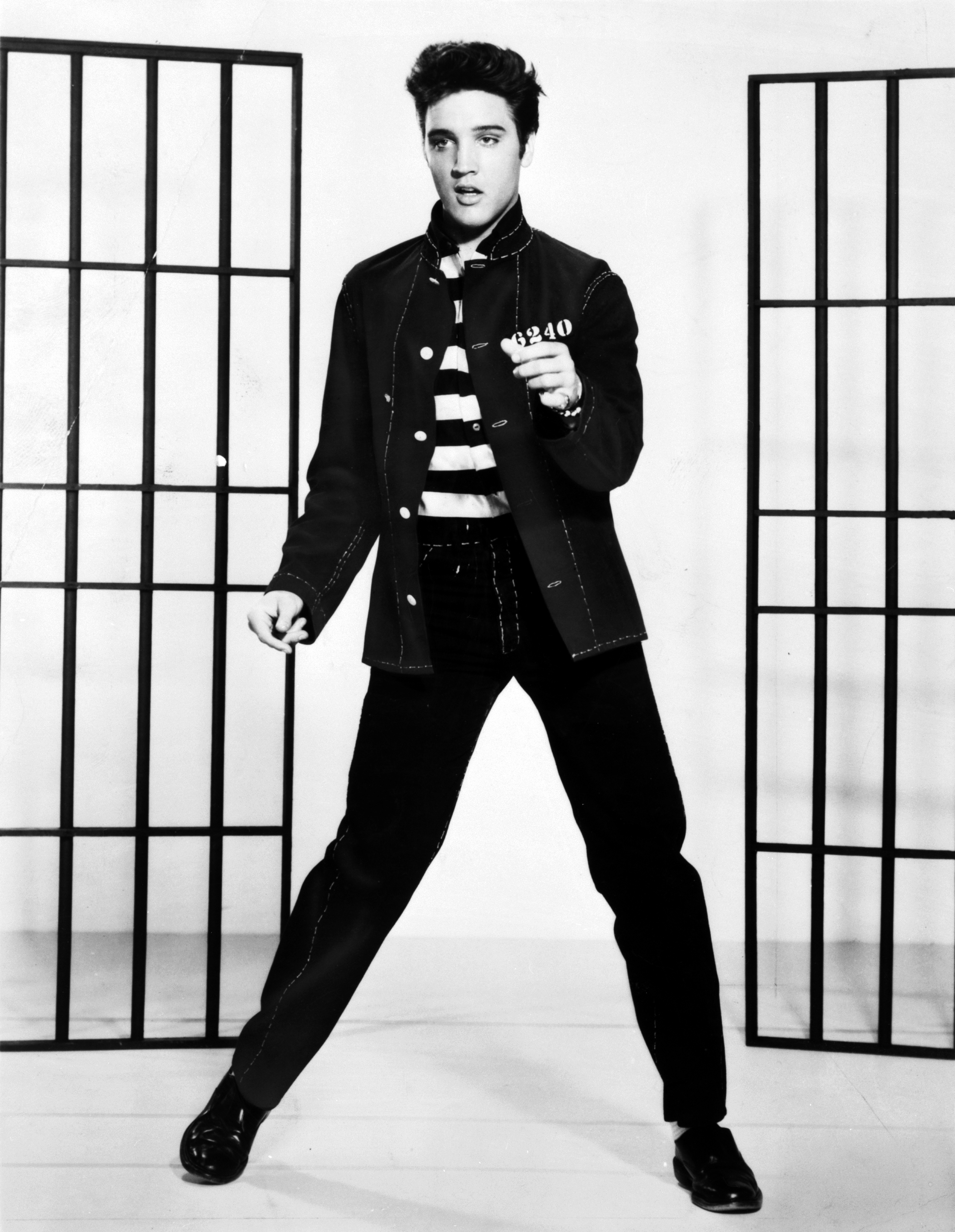
Elvis Presley in a promotion shot for Jailhouse Rock in 1957

"Rockabilly" usually (but not exclusively) refers to the type of rock and roll music which was played and recorded in the mid-1950s primarily by white singers such as Elvis Presley, Carl Perkins, Johnny Cash, and Jerry Lee Lewis, who drew mainly on the country roots of the music. Presley was greatly influenced by and incorporated his style of music with that of some of the greatest Black musicians like BB King, Arthur Crudup and Fats Domino. His style of music combined with black influences created controversy during a turbulent time in history. Many other popular rock and roll singers of the time, such as Fats Domino and Little Richard, came out of the black rhythm and blues tradition, making the music attractive to white audiences, and are not usually classed as "rockabilly".

Presley popularized rock and roll on a wider scale than any other single performer, and by 1956, he had emerged as the singing sensation of the nation.

Bill Flagg, a resident of Connecticut, began referring to his mix of hillbilly and rock 'n' roll music as rockabilly around 1953.

In July 1954, Presley recorded the regional hit "That's All Right" at Sam Phillips' Sun Studio in Memphis. Three months earlier, on April 12, 1954, Bill Haley & His Comets recorded "Rock Around the Clock". Although only a minor hit when first released, when used in the opening sequence of the movie Blackboard Jungle a year later, it set the rock and roll boom in motion. The song became one of the biggest hits in history, and frenzied teens flocked to see Haley and the Comets perform it, causing riots in some cities. "Rock Around the Clock" was a breakthrough success for the group; traditionally, the song has been seen as the major breakthrough for the rock and roll genre, as its immense popularity introduced the music to a global audience. Haley and the Comets' earlier hit "Crazy Man, Crazy" is recognized as the first rock and roll song to hit the mainstream charts, peaking at No. 15 on the Billboard singles chart in May 1953, and notably features guitar fills in place of piano or saxophone.

In 1956, the arrival of rockabilly was underlined by the success of songs like "Folsom Prison Blues" by Johnny Cash, "Blue Suede Shoes" by Perkins, and the No. 1 hit "Heartbreak Hotel" by Presley. For a few years it became the most commercially successful form of rock and roll. Later rockabilly acts, particularly performing songwriters like Buddy Holly, would be a major influence on British Invasion acts and particularly on the song writing of the Beatles and through them on the nature of later rock music.

=== Cover versions ===
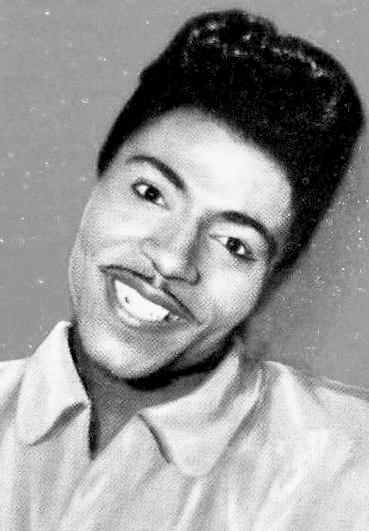
Little Richard in 1957

Many of the earliest white rock and roll hits were covers or partial re-writes of earlier black rhythm and blues or blues songs. Through the late 1940s and early 1950s, R&B music had been gaining a stronger beat and a wilder style, with artists such as Fats Domino and Johnny Otis speeding up the tempos and increasing the backbeat to great popularity on the juke joint circuit. Before the efforts of Freed and others, black music was taboo on many white-owned radio outlets, but artists and producers quickly recognized the potential of rock and roll. Some of Presley's early recordings were covers of black rhythm and blues or blues songs, such as "That's All Right" (a countrified arrangement of a blues number), "Baby Let's Play House", "Lawdy Miss Clawdy", and "Hound Dog". The racial lines, however, are rather more clouded by the fact that some of these R&B songs originally recorded by black artists had been written by white songwriters, such as the team of Jerry Leiber and Mike Stoller. Songwriting credits were often unreliable; many publishers, record executives, and even managers (both white and black) would insert their name as a composer in order to collect royalty checks.

Covers were customary in the music industry at the time; it was made particularly easy by the compulsory license provision of United States copyright law (still in effect). One of the first relevant successful covers was Wynonie Harris's transformation of Roy Brown's 1947 original jump blues hit "Good Rocking Tonight" into a more showy rocker and the Louis Prima rocker "Oh Babe" in 1950, as well as Amos Milburn's cover of what may have been the first white rock and roll record, Hardrock Gunter's "Birmingham Bounce" in 1949. The most notable trend, however, was white pop covers of black R&B numbers. The more familiar sound of these covers may have been more palatable to white audiences, there may have been an element of prejudice, but labels aimed at the white market also had much better distribution networks and were generally much more profitable. Famously, Pat Boone recorded sanitized versions of songs recorded by the likes of Fats Domino, Little Richard, the Flamingos and Ivory Joe Hunter. Later, as those songs became popular, the original artists' recordings received radio play as well.

The cover versions were not necessarily straightforward imitations. For example, Bill Haley's incompletely bowdlerized cover of "Shake, Rattle and Roll" transformed Big Joe Turner's humorous and racy tale of adult love into an energetic teen dance number, while Georgia Gibbs replaced Etta James' tough, sarcastic vocal in "Roll with Me, Henry" (covered as "Dance with Me, Henry") with a perkier vocal more appropriate for an audience unfamiliar with the song to which James's song was an answer, Hank Ballard's "Work with Me, Annie". Presley's rock and roll version of "Hound Dog", taken mainly from a version recorded by the pop band Freddie Bell and the Bellboys, was very different from the blues shouter that Big Mama Thornton had recorded four years earlier. Other white artists who recorded cover versions of rhythm and blues songs included Gale Storm (Smiley Lewis' "I Hear You Knockin'"), The Diamonds (The Gladiolas' "Little Darlin'" and Frankie Lymon & the Teenagers' "Why Do Fools Fall in Love?"), The Crew-Cuts (the Chords' "Sh-Boom" and Nappy Brown's "Don't Be Angry"), The Fontane Sisters (The Jewels' "Hearts of Stone") and The McGuire Sisters (The Moonglows' "Sincerely").

== Decline and later developments ==
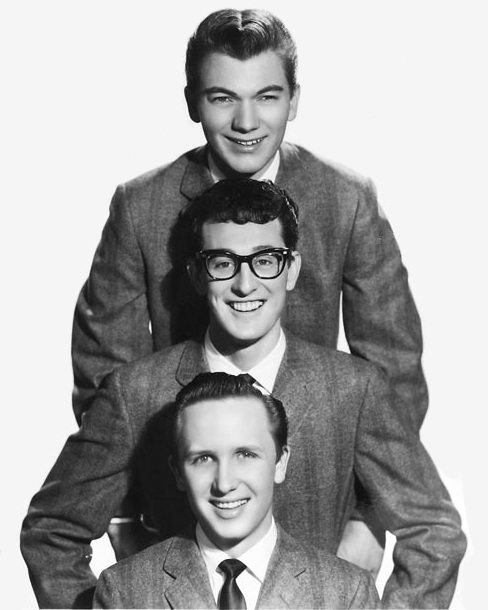
Buddy Holly and his band, the Crickets

Some commentators have suggested a decline of rock and roll starting in 1958. The retirement of Little Richard to become a preacher (October 1957), the departure of Presley for service in the United States Army (March 1958), the scandal surrounding Jerry Lee Lewis' marriage to his thirteen-year-old cousin (May 1958), riots caused by Bill Haley's ill-fated tour of Europe (October 1958), the deaths of Buddy Holly, the Big Bopper and Ritchie Valens in a plane crash (February 1959), the breaking of the Payola scandal implicating major figures, including Alan Freed, in bribery and corruption in promoting individual acts or songs (November 1959), the arrest of Chuck Berry (December 1959), and the death of Eddie Cochran in a car crash (April 1960) gave a sense that the initial phase of rock and roll had come to an end.

During the late 1950s and early 1960s, the rawer sounds of Presley, Gene Vincent, Jerry Lee Lewis and Buddy Holly were commercially superseded by a more polished, commercial style of rock and roll influenced pop music. Marketing frequently emphasized the physical looks of the artist rather than the music, contributing to the successful careers of Ricky Nelson, Tommy Sands, Bobby Vee, Jimmy Clanton, and the Philadelphia trio of Bobby Rydell, Frankie Avalon, and Fabian, who all became "teen idols".

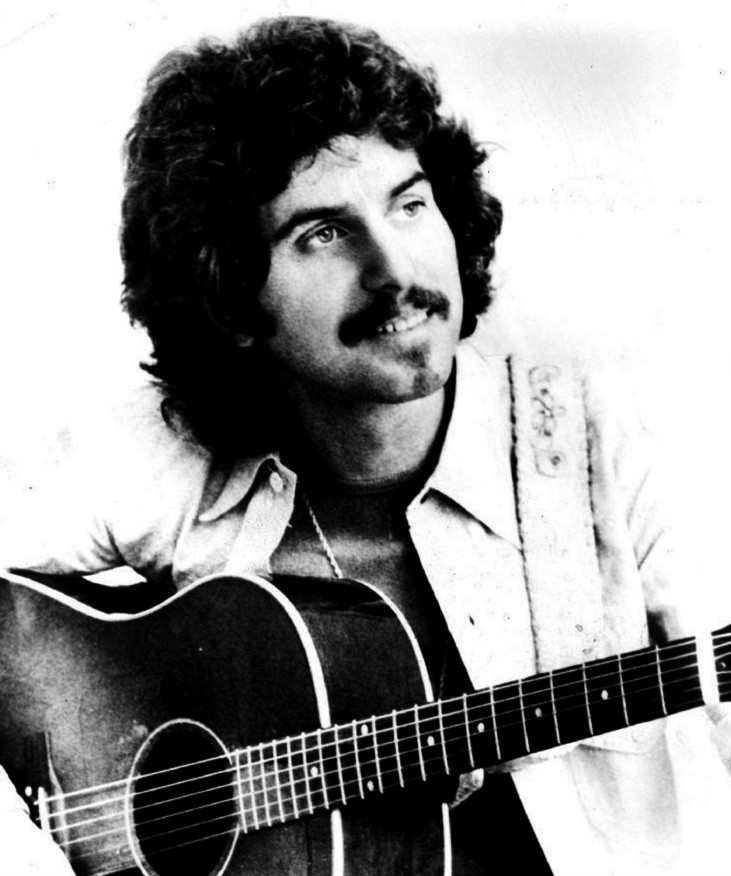
Johnny Rivers was a key 1960s rock artist known for hits like "Memphis" and his "Go-go" style.

Some music historians have also pointed to important and innovative developments that built on rock and roll in this period, including multitrack recording, developed by Les Paul, the electronic treatment of sound by such innovators as Joe Meek, and the "Wall of Sound" productions of Phil Spector, continued desegregation of the charts, the rise of surf music, garage rock and the Twist dance craze. Surf rock in particular, noted for the use of reverb-drenched guitars, became one of the most popular forms of American rock of the early 1960s.

While the sounds of the British Invasion would become the superseding forms of rock music during the mid-1960s, a few American artists were nonetheless able to achieve chart successes with rock and roll recordings during this time. The most notable of these was Johnny Rivers, who with hits such as "Memphis" enjoyed significant success in spite of the ongoing British Invasion. Another example was Bobby Fuller and his group, the Bobby Fuller Four, who were especially inspired by Buddy Holly and stuck with a rock and roll style, scoring their most notable hit with "I Fought the Law" (1965).

== British rock and roll ==
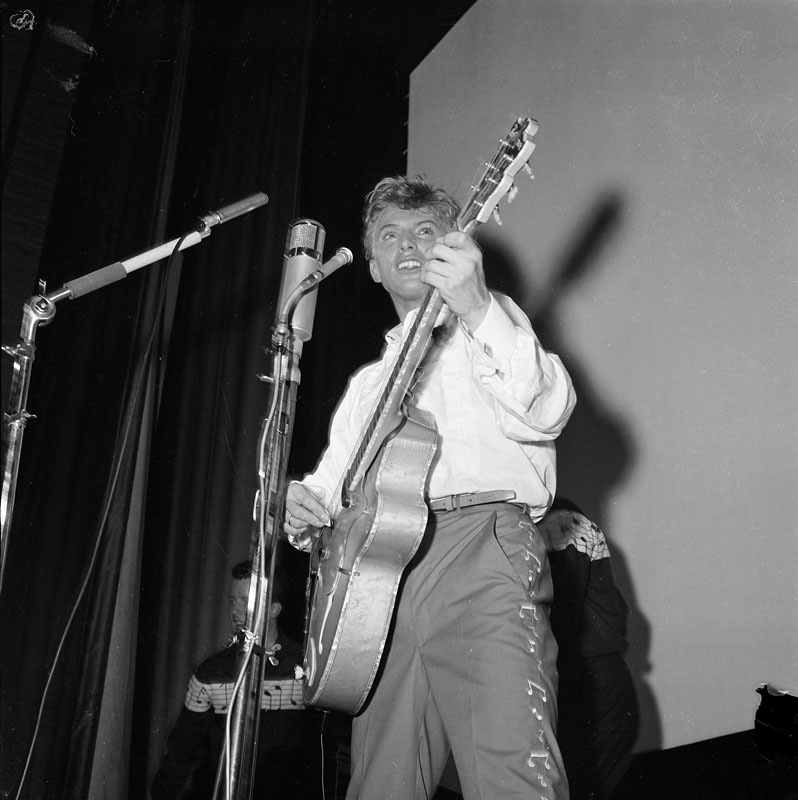
Tommy Steele, one of the first British rock and rollers, performing in Stockholm in 1957

In the 1950s, Britain was well placed to receive American rock and roll music and culture. It shared a common language, had been exposed to American culture through the stationing of troops in the country, and shared many social developments, including the emergence of distinct youth sub-cultures, which in Britain included the Teddy Boys and the rockers. Trad jazz became popular in the UK, and many of its musicians were influenced by related American styles, including boogie woogie and the blues. The skiffle craze, led by Lonnie Donegan, used amateurish versions of American folk songs and encouraged many of the subsequent generation of rock and roll, folk, R&B and beat musicians to start performing. At the same time British audiences were beginning to encounter American rock and roll, initially through films including Blackboard Jungle (1955) and Rock Around the Clock (1956). Both movies featured the Bill Haley & His Comets hit "Rock Around the Clock", which first entered the British charts in early 1955 – four months before it reached the US pop charts – topped the British charts later that year and again in 1956 and helped identify rock and roll with teenage delinquency.

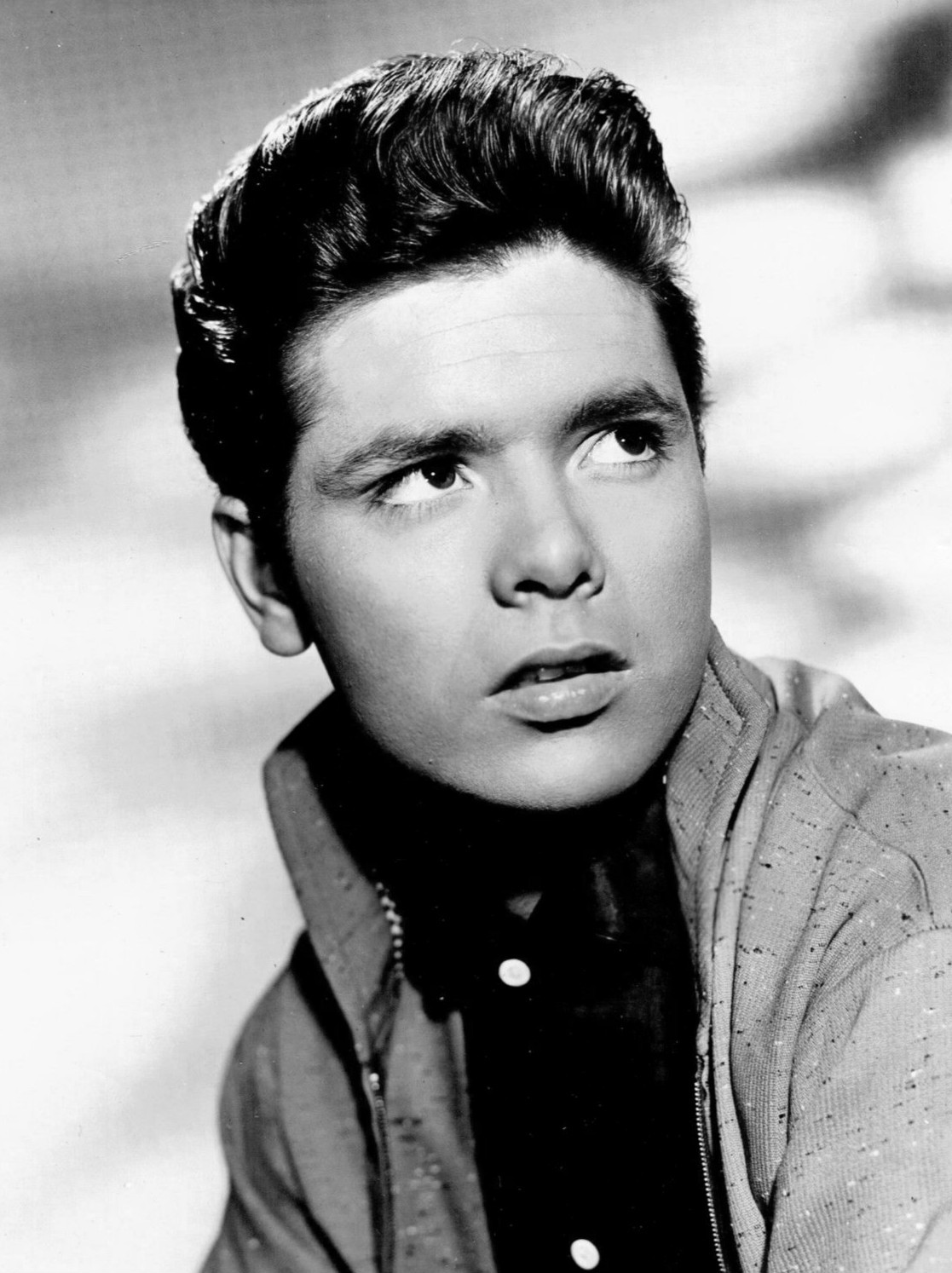
Cliff Richard became an early British rock and roll star with his 1958 hit "Move It".

The initial response of the British music industry was to attempt to produce copies of American records, recorded with session musicians and often fronted by teen idols. More grass roots British rock and rollers soon began to appear, including Wee Willie Harris and Tommy Steele. During this period American Rock and Roll remained dominant but in 1958 Britain produced its first "authentic" rock and roll song and star, when Cliff Richard reached number 2 in the charts with "Move It". At the same time, TV shows such as Six-Five Special and Oh Boy! promoted the careers of British rock and rollers like Marty Wilde and Adam Faith. Cliff Richard and his backing band, the Shadows, were the most successful home grown rock and roll based acts of the era. Other leading acts included Billy Fury, Joe Brown, and Johnny Kidd & the Pirates, whose 1960 hit song "Shakin' All Over" became a rock and roll standard.

As interest in rock and roll was beginning to subside in America in the late 1950s and early 1960s, it was taken up by groups in British cities like Liverpool, Manchester, Birmingham, and London. About the same time, a British blues scene developed, initially led by purist blues followers such as Alexis Korner and Cyril Davies who were inspired by American musicians such as Robert Johnson, Muddy Waters and Howlin' Wolf. Many groups moved towards the beat music of rock and roll and rhythm and blues from skiffle, like the Quarrymen who became the Beatles, producing a form of rock and roll revivalism that carried them and many other groups to national success from about 1963 and to international success from 1964, known in America as the British Invasion. Groups that followed the Beatles included the beat-influenced Freddie and the Dreamers, Wayne Fontana and the Mindbenders, Herman's Hermits and the Dave Clark Five. Early British rhythm and blues groups with more blues influences include the Animals, the Rolling Stones, and the Yardbirds.

== Cultural influence ==
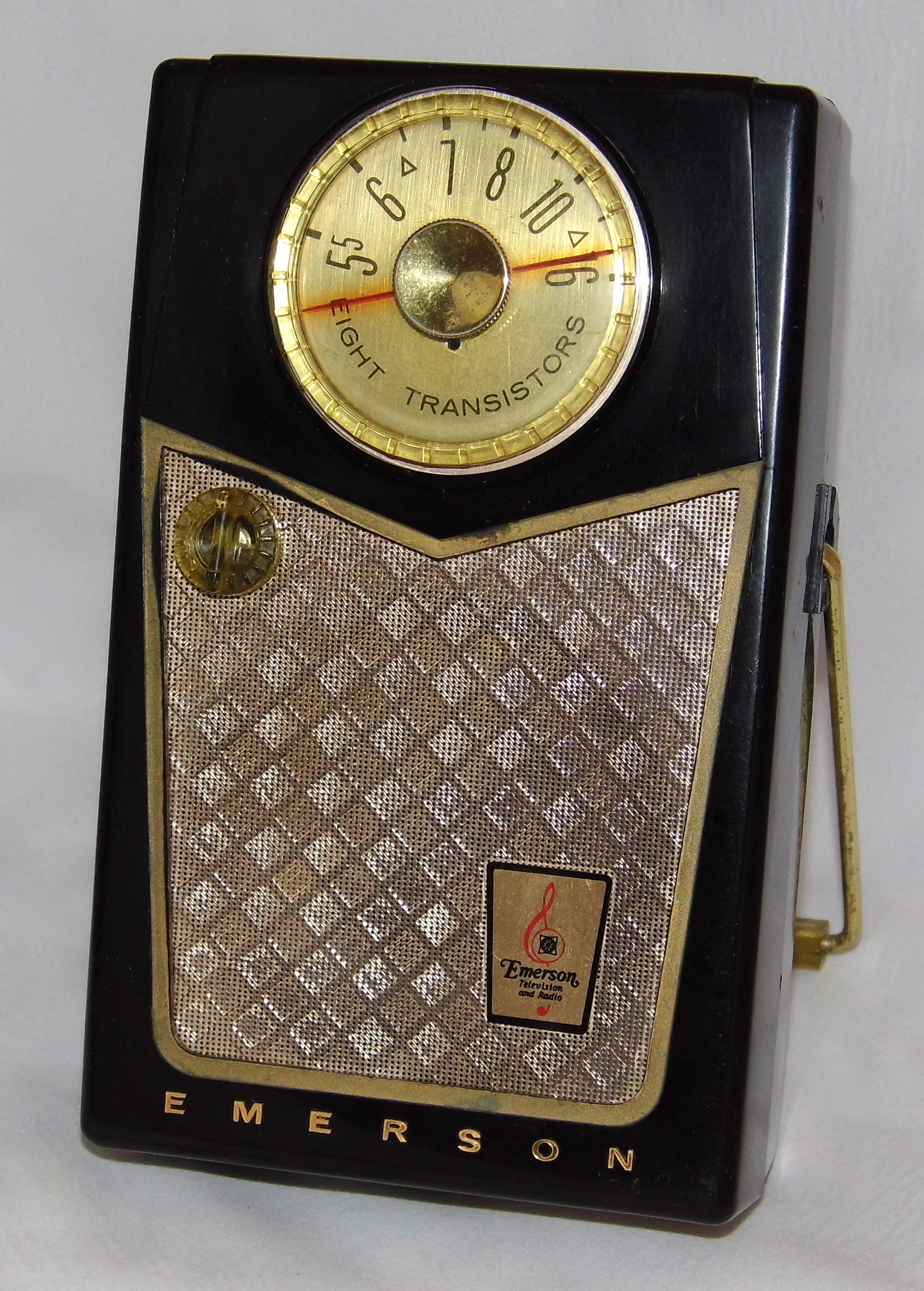
The transistor radio (1958 Emerson pictured) introduced AM radio and rock and roll music to baby boomer children in American households.

G. C. Altschuler notes that rock and roll influenced lifestyles, fashion, attitudes, and language, possibly even contributing to the civil rights movement since both African-American and European-American teens enjoyed the music.

William J. Schafer states that the lyrics of rock and roll songs, dealing with issues such as cars, school, dating, and clothing, described events and conflicts to which most listeners could relate through personal experience. Topics such as sex that had generally been considered taboo began to appear in rock and roll lyrics. This led to the music breaking boundaries and expressing emotions that people were actually feeling but had not discussed openly, leading to an awakening in American youth culture.

=== Race ===
In the crossover of African-American "race music" to a growing white youth audience, the popularization of rock and roll involved both black performers reaching a white audience and white musicians performing African-American music. Rock and roll appeared at a time when racial tensions in the United States were entering a new phase, with the beginnings of the civil rights movement for desegregation, leading to the U.S. Supreme Court ruling that abolished the policy of "separate but equal" in 1954, but leaving a policy which would be extremely difficult to enforce in parts of the United States. The coming together of white youth audiences and black music in rock and roll inevitably provoked strong white racist reactions within the US, with many whites condemning its breaking down of barriers based on color. According to M. T. Bertrand, many observers saw rock and roll as heralding the way for desegregation in creating a new form of music that encouraged racial cooperation and shared experience. Mina Carson argued that early rock and roll was instrumental in the way both white and black teenagers identified themselves.

=== Teen culture ===
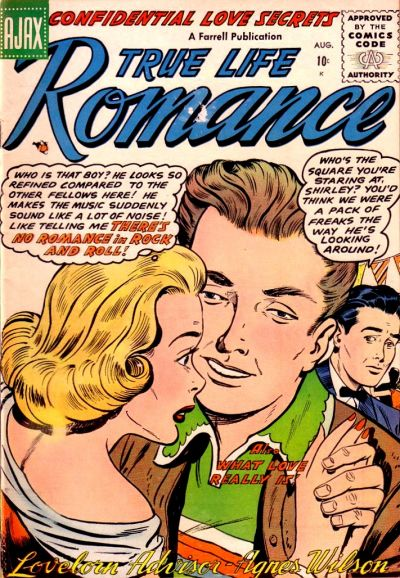
"There's No Romance in Rock and Roll" made the cover of True Life Romance in 1956.

Ruth Padel claimed that rock and roll was one of the first music genres to define an age group. It gave teenagers a sense of belonging, even when they were alone. Rock and roll emerged with teen culture among the first baby boomer generation, who had greater relative affluence and leisure time and adopted rock and roll as part of a distinct subculture. This involved not just music, absorbed via radio, record buying, jukeboxes and TV programs like American Bandstand, but also extended to film, clothes, hair, cars and motorcycles, and distinctive language. The youth culture exemplified by rock and roll was a recurring source of concern for older generations, who worried about juvenile delinquency and social rebellion, particularly because, to a large extent, rock and roll culture was shared by different racial and social groups.

In America, that concern was conveyed even in youth cultural artifacts such as comic books. In "There's No Romance in Rock and Roll" from True Life Romance (1956), a defiant teen dates a rock and roll-loving boy but drops him for one who likes traditional adult music—to her parents' relief. In Britain, where postwar prosperity was more limited, rock and roll culture became attached to the pre-existing Teddy Boy movement, largely working class in origin, and eventually to the rockers. "On the white side of the deeply segregated music market", rock and roll became marketed for teenagers, as in Dion and the Belmonts' "A Teenager in Love" (1959).

=== Dance styles ===
From its early 1950s beginnings through the early 1960s, rock and roll spawned new dance crazes including the twist. Teenagers found the syncopated backbeat rhythm especially suited to reviving Big Band-era jitterbug dancing. Sock hops, school and church gym dances, and home basement dance parties became the rage, and American teens watched Dick Clark's American Bandstand to keep up on the latest dance and fashion styles. From the mid-1960s on, as "rock and roll" was rebranded as "rock", later dance genres followed, leading to funk, disco, house, techno, and hip-hop.

== Sources ==
- Bogdanov, V.; Woodstra, C.; Erlewine, S. T., eds. (2002). All Music Guide to Rock: the Definitive Guide to Rock, Pop, and Soul (3rd ed.). Milwaukee, WI: Backbeat Books. ISBN 0-87930-653-X.
- Rock and Roll: A Social History, by Paul Friedlander (1996), Westview Press (ISBN 0-8133-2725-3)
- "The Rock Window: A Way of Understanding Rock Music" by Paul Friedlander, in Tracking: Popular Music Studies Archived September 23, 2006, at the Wayback Machine, Volume I, number 1, Spring, 1988
- The Rolling Stone Encyclopedia of Rock & Roll by Holly George-Warren, Patricia Romanowski, Jon Pareles (2001), Fireside Press (ISBN 0-7432-0120-5)
- The Sound of the City: the Rise of Rock and Roll, by Charlie Gillett (1970), E.P. Dutton
- Gilliland, John (1969). "Hail, Hail, Rock 'n' Roll: The rock revolution gets underway" (audio). Pop Chronicles. University of North Texas Libraries.
- The Fifties by David Halberstam (1996), Random House (ISBN 0-517-15607-5)
- The Rolling Stone Illustrated History of Rock and Roll : The Definitive History of the Most Important Artists and Their Music by editors James Henke, Holly George-Warren, Anthony Decurtis, Jim Miller (1992), Random House (ISBN 0-679-73728-6)
