= Rock Awhile =

1949 single by Goree Carter

- A-side

Single by Goree Carter & His Hepcats
- B-side: "Back Home Blues"
- Released: 1949
- Recorded: April 1949
- Studio: ACA Studios
- Genre: Rock and roll; electric blues; Jump Blues
- Length: 2:38
- Label: Freedom Recording Company
- Songwriter: Goree Carter

Goree Carter & His Hepcats singles chronology
| "Rock Awhile" (1949) | "I'll Send You" (1949) |

"Rock Awhile" is a song by American singer-songwriter Goree Carter, recorded in April 1949 for the Freedom Recording Company in Houston, Texas.

The song was released as the 18-year-old Carter's debut single (with "Back Home Blues" as the B-side) shortly after recording. The track is considered by many sources to be the first rock and roll song, and has been called a better candidate than the more commonly cited "Rocket 88", which was released two years later. The song features an over-driven electric guitar style similar to that of Chuck Berry years later.

The former New York Times pop critic, Robert Palmer, made this comment about the recording in 1995:

"The clarion guitar intro differs hardly at all from some of the intros Chuck Berry would unleash on his own records after 1955; the guitar solo crackles through an overdriven amplifier; and the boogie-based rhythm charges right along. The subject matter, too, is appropriate -- the record announces that it's time to 'rock awhile,' and then proceeds to show how it's done."

== Personnel ==
- Goree Carter – vocals, electric guitar
- Lonnie Lyons – piano
- Louis "Nunu" Pitts – bass
- Allison Tucker – drums
- Conrad O. Johnson – alto saxophone
- Sam Williams – tenor saxophone (rhythm)
- Nelson Mills – trumpet (rhythm)

== See also ==
- Origins of rock and roll
