= Freedom Records (Houston-based label) =

American R&B record label (1950s)

Freedom Records was an American record label that was based in Houston, Texas. It was founded in 1948 by Sol Kahal.

== Background ==
It originally specialized in rhythm and blues, but expanded to include country and pop music. Among its recording artists were Big Joe Turner, L. C. Williams, Goree Carter and Little Willie Littlefield. The label lasted through the early 1950s. All releases were 78s.

== History ==
The label's biggest success was "Ethel Mae" by L.C. Williams.

== Later years ==
The catalogue is currently owned by Fivepin Music based in Toronto.

== Discography ==
- 1200A Perry Cain - "My Heart Belongs To You"
- 1200B Perry Cain - "Big Timing Grandma"
- 1501A Conny's Combo - "I Don't Want Your Baby"
- 1501B Conny's Combo - "Won't You Please Come Back"
- 1502A Goree Carter - "Sweet Old Woman's Blues"
- 1502B Little Willie Littlefield - "Littlefield Boogie"
- 1504A Lonnie Lyons - "Lonely Heart Blues"
- 1505B Lonnie Lyons - "Barrelhouse Nightcap"
- 1506A Goree Carter and His Hepcats - "Back Home Blues"
- 1506B Goree Carter - "Rock Awhile"
- 1507A Lonnie Lyons - "Far Away Blues"
- 1507B Lonnie Lyons - "Flychick Blues"
- 1509A Leroy Country Johnson - "No One To Love Me"
- 1509B Leroy Country Johnson - "Log House On The Hill"
- 1510A Conny's Combo with L.C. Williams - "That's Alright"
- 1510B Conny's Combo with L.C. Williams - "Gonna Change My Love"
- 1511A Goree Carter - "I'll Send You"
- 1511B Goree Carter - "How Can You Love Me"
- 1512A Lonnie Lyons - "Neat And Sweet Part 1"
- 1512B Lonnie Lyons - "Neat And Sweet Part 2"
- 1513A Jesse Thomas - "Guess I'll Walk Alone"
- 1513B Jesse Thomas - "Let's Have Some Fun"
- 1516A Goree Carter - "Hoy Hoy"
- 1516B Goree Carter - "I Just Thought Of You"
- 1517A L.C. Williams - "Shout Baby Shout"
- 1517B L.C. Williams - "Ethel Mae"
- 1518A Goree Carter - "She's Just Old Fashioned"
- 1518B Goree Carter - "Is It True"
- 1519A Lonnie Lyons - "Helpless"
- 1519B Lonnie Lyons - "Down In The Groovy"
- 1520A Connie Mac Booker - "Loretta"
- 1520B Connie Mac Booker - "My Baby Left Me"
- 1521A Carl Campbell - "Between Midnight And Dawn"
- 1521B Carl Campbell - "Ooh Wee Baby"
- 1522A Goree Carter - "She's My Best Bet"
- 1522B Goree Carter - ??
- 1523A Lonnie Lyons - "Betrayed"
- 1523B Lonnie Lyons - "Sneaky Joe"
- 1524A L.C. Williams And Conney's Combo - "Jelly Roll"
- 1524B L.C. Williams And Conney's Combo - "Louisiana Boogie"
- 1528A Carl Campbell - "Getting High"
- 1528B Carl Campbell - "Goin' Down To Nashville"
- 1529A L.C. Williams - "All Through My Dreams"
- 1529B L.C. Williams - "Mean And Evil Blues"
- 1531A Joe Turner - "Still In The Dark"
- 1531B Joe Turner - "Adam Bit The Apple"
- 1533A Clarence Samuels - "Low Top Inn"
- 1533B Clarence Samuels - "Lost My Head"
- 1535A Joe Houston - "Jumpin' The Blues"
- 1535B Joe Houston - "Your Little Girl Is Gone"
- 1536 B Goree Carter - "Serenade"
- 1536A Goree Carter - "C'mon Let's Boogie"
- 1537A Joe Turner - "Just A Travellin' Man"
- 1537B Joe Turner - "Life Is Like A Card Game"
- 1538A Texas Alexander And Benton's Busy Bees - "Bottoms Blues"
- 1538B Texas Alexander And Benton's Busy Bees - "Crossroads"
- 1539A Sammy Harris And Orchestra - "King Zulu"
- 1539B Sammy Harris And Orchestra - "Fatso"
- 1540A Joe Turner - "After While You'll Be Sorry"
- 1540B Joe Turner - "Feelin' Happy"
- 1541A Clarence Samuels - "She Walk She Walk (part 1)"
- 1541B Clarence Samuels - "She Walk She Walk (part 2)"
- 1542A L.C. Williams - "My Darkest Hours"
- 1542B L.C. Williams - "I Want My Baby Back"
- 1544A Clarence Samuels - "Somebody Gotta Go"
- 1544B Clarence Samuels - "Hey Joe!"
- 1545A Joe Turner - "I Want My Baby"
- 1545B Joe Turner - "Midnight Is Here Again"
- 1546A Joe Turner - "Jumpin' At The Jubilee"
- 1546B Joe Turner - "Lonely World"
- 1563A Stubby Stubblefield - "Buggy Wuggy Love"
- 1563B Stubby Stubblefield - "Wurry Wurry Wurry"
- 5000A Billie Stevens And Paul - "Moonlight And Roses"
- 5000B Billie Stevens And Paul - "Send Me The Pillow That You Dream On"
- 5001A Dickie Jones And Rhythm Rangers - "Houston Texas Blues"
- 5001B Dickie Jones And Rhythm Rangers - "Be Careful Little Darlin'"
- 5003A Joan Brooks - "Heading Back To Houston"
- 5003B Joan Brooks - "Salt Your Pillow Down"
- 5005A Jimmy Spear And The Bluebonnet Boys - "Turn Me 'Round"
- 5005B Jimmy Spear And The Bluebonnet Boys - "Mad At My Heart"
- 5007A Benny Leaders With Western Rangers - "In A Land Of Broken Dreams"
- 5007B Benny Leaders With Western Rangers - "Think Of Me"
- 5008A Pete Hunter And The Dude Ramblers - "The Tater Tune"
- 5008B Pete Hunter And The Dude Ramblers - "Wrapped In Cellophane"
- 5009A Jimmy Johnson With Jack Rhodes Ramblers - "Salt Your Pillow Down"
- 5009B Jimmy Johnson With Jack Rhodes Ramblers - "Could You"
- 5010A Cotton Thompson And The Village Boys - "Let's Keep Our Love Affair"
- 5010B Cotton Thompson And The Village Boys - "Jelly Roll Blues"
- 5012A Benny Leaders With Western Rangers - "Boots Don't Leave Me"
- 5012B Benny Leaders With Western Rangers - "I've Got The Craziest Feeling"
- 5014A Trail Blazers And Carol - "(A Cowboy's) Silent Light"
- 5014B Trail Blazers And George - "Little Mohee"
- 5015A Hub Sutter And His Hub Caps - "I Don't Want My Baby Back"
- 5015B Hub Sutter And His Hub Caps - "I Live Only For You"
- 5016A Drew Lewis And Wink Lewis' Dude Ranchers - "What's A Matter Baby"
- 5016B Drew Lewis And Wink Lewis' Dude Ranchers - "A Love A Dream A Prayer"
- 5018A Johnny Nelms And The Sunset Cowboys - "Bride To Be"
- 5018B Johnny Nelms And The Sunset Cowboys - "If I Can't Have You"
- 5020A Benny Leaders And The Western Rangers - "Harbor Lights"
- 5021A Jimmy Spear And The Bluebonnet Boys - "Heart Carved In A Tree"
- 5021B Jimmy Spear And The Bluebonnet Boys - "Heart Wrapped In Love"
- 5022A Little Tommy Sands - "Syrup Soppin' Blues"
- 5022B Little Tommy Sands - "Love Pains"
- 5023A Bob Jones And His Troubadors - "Somebody's Stealin' My Baby's Kisses"
- 5023B Bob Jones And His Troubadors - "The Dream I Had Of You"
- 5025A Tommy Durden And The Westernaires - "Crossroads"
- 5025B Tommy Durden And The Westernaires - "Hula Boogie"
- 5027A Laura Lee And The Ranch Hands - "Everyone But Me"
- 5027B Laura Lee And The Ranch Hands - "I'm Lonely For You Darling"
- 5028A Peck Touchton And The Sunset Wranglers - "Walk 'Em Off Blues"
- 5028B Peck Touchton And The Sunset Wranglers - "Lonely World"
- 5029A Bennie Leaders And The Western Rangers - "Why Don't You Leave My Heart Alone"
- 5029B Bernie Leaders And The Rangers Trio - "Naggin' Woman"
- 5030A Hub Sutter And His Hubcats - "Tellin' My Baby Bye Bye"
- 5030B Hub Sutter And His Hubcats - "How Can You Love Me"
- 5031A Jimmy Johnson With Jack Rhodes Ramblers - "Always Remember"
- 5031B Jimmy Johnson With Jack Rhodes Ramblers - "Warm Beer And A Cold Cold Woman"
- 5033A Charlie Harris And D Hendon's Western - "Those Tears In Your Eyes"
- 5033B Charlie Harris And D Hendon's Western - "No Shoes Boogie"
- 5037A Tex And Shorty Dunn - "Don'T Break My Heart Little Darling"
- 5037B Tex And Shorty Dunn - "Walking Home From An Old Country School"
- 5038A Benny Leaders And The Ranger Trio - "Give My Heart A Break"
- 5038B Benny Leaders And The Ranger Trio - "Always Remember"
- 5039A Louis Lamb And He Melody Boys - "I Will Trouble You No More"
- 5039B Louis Lamb And He Melody Boys - "Down Hill And Shady"
- 5040A Coye Wilcox - "It's Nobody's Business (What We Do)"
- 5040B Coye Wilcox - "Look What Love Has Done To Me"
- 5041A Peck Touchton - "Walkin' On Top Of The World"
- 5041B Peck Touchton - "Sighing Trees And A Broken Heart"
- 5042A Tex Jones And His Texas Rangers - "A Gambler's Last Hand"
- 5042B Tex Jones And His Texas Rangers - "Little Darlin'"
- SP 103 B Rev. Frank M. Johnson - "Only A Look"
- SP 103 A Rev. Frank M. Johnson - "How Jesus Brought Me Out"
- SP 104A Silvertone Gospel Singers - "I'll Make It Alright"
- SP 104B Silvertone Gospel Singers - "Where Shall I Be"
- SP 111A The Kingstar Harmonizers - "In These Dark Hours"
- SP 111B The Kingstar Harmonizers - "Sing Until The Power Of The Lord Come Down"
- SP 112A The Loyal Five - "John The Revelator"
- SP 112B The Loyal Five - "You'd Better Run"
- SP 114A The Southwind Quartette - "Deep River"
- SP 114B The Southwind Quartette - "Road So Rough and Rugged"
- SP 115A The Southwind Quartette - "Bridle My Tongue"
- SP 115B The Southwind Quartette - "When I Get Home"
- SP 116A The Singing Sons of St. Petersburg FL - "In That Awful Hour"
- SP 116B The Singing Sons of St. Petersburg FL - "In The Wilderness"
