= Jump blues =

Style of blues music

- Stylistic origins: Blues; jazz; swing; boogie-woogie
- Cultural origins: Late 1930s, U.S.

Fusion genres
- Electric blues; rhythm and blues; rock and roll

Jump blues is an uptempo style of blues with jazz and boogie woogie influence, usually played by small groups and featuring horn instruments. It was popular in the 1940s and was a precursor of rhythm and blues and rock and roll. Appreciation of jump blues was renewed in the 1990s as part of the swing revival.

== Origins ==
Jump blues evolved from the music of big bands such as those of Lionel Hampton and Lucky Millinder in the early 1940s. The typical jump blues lineup consisted of between five and seven members, including sax, bass, drums and piano and/or guitar. The genre produced musicians including Louis Jordan, Earl Bostic, Arnett Cobb, Roy Brown, Amos Milburn, and Joe Liggins, as well as sax soloists Jack McVea, Big Jay McNeely, and Bull Moose Jackson. Jordan was the most popular of the jump blues stars. Hits included Jordan's "Saturday Night Fish Fry", Brown's "Good Rockin' Tonight" and McNeely's "Deacon's Hop".

One important stylistic prototype in the development of R&B was jump blues, pioneered by Louis Jordan, with ... His Tympany Five ... three horns and a rhythm section, while stylistically his music melded elements of swing and blues, incorporating the shuffle rhythm, boogie-woogie bass lines, and short horn patterns or riffs. The songs featured the use of African American vernacular language, humor, and vocal call-and-response sections between Jordan and the band. Jordan's music appealed to both African American and white audiences, and he had broad success with hit songs like "Is You Is or Is You Ain't My Baby" (1944).

Blues and jazz were part of the same musical world, with many musicians straddling both genres. Jump bands such as the Tympany Five, which came into being at the same time as the boogie-woogie revival, achieved maximum effect with an eight-to-the-bar boogie-woogie style.

Jordan's "raucous recordings" with the Tympany Five like "Saturday Night Fish Fry", one of the first to feature a distorted electric guitar, "literally made its listeners jump to its pulsing beat". At least two other Jordan records are viewed as jump blues: "Caldonia" and "Choo Choo Ch'Boogie". Jordan's jump blues combined good-natured novelty lyrics (some with suggestive double meanings), pushing the tempo, strengthening the beat, and layering the sound with his bluesy saxophone and playful melodies.

Lionel Hampton recorded the stomping big-band blues song "Flying Home" in 1942. Featuring a choked, screaming tenor sax performance by Illinois Jacquet, the song was a hit in the "race" category. Billboard described "Flying Home" as "an unusually swingy side...with a bright bounce in the medium tempo and a steady drive maintained, it's a jumper that defies standing still".

Both Hampton and Jordan combined the popular boogie-woogie rhythm, a grittier version of swing-era saxophone styles as exemplified by Coleman Hawkins and Ben Webster, and playful, humorous lyrics or verbal asides laced with jive talk.

As this urban, jazz-based music became more popular, musicians who wanted to "play for the people" began favoring a heavy, insistent beat. which appealed to black listeners who no longer wished to be identified with "life down home".

Jump groups, employed to play for jitterbug dances at a much lower cost than big bands, became popular with agents and ballroom owners. The saxophonist Art Chaney said "[w]e were insulted when an audience wouldn't dance".

Jump was especially popular in the late 1940s and early 1950s, through artists such as Louis Jordan, Big Joe Turner, Roy Brown, Charles Brown, Helen Humes, T-Bone Walker, Roy Milton, Billy Wright, Wynonie Harris, Louis Prima, and Sonny Terry and Brownie McGhee. Less frequently mentioned, Goree Carter also recorded some jump blues; his "Rock Awhile" is said by Robert Palmer to be an appropriate candidate for the title of first rock and roll record.

By the mid-1950s, some jump blues songs had become core standards, with songs like "Train Kept a Rollin" played by rock groups including the Rock and Roll Trio, the Yardbirds, Aerosmith and Motörhead. "Five Guys Named Moe" was covered in the 1980s by the Honeydrippers.

The term "rock and roll" had a strong sexual connotation in jump blues and R&B, but by the time DJ Alan Freed referred to rock and roll in the mid-1950s, "the sexual component had been dialled down enough that it simply became an acceptable term for dancing".

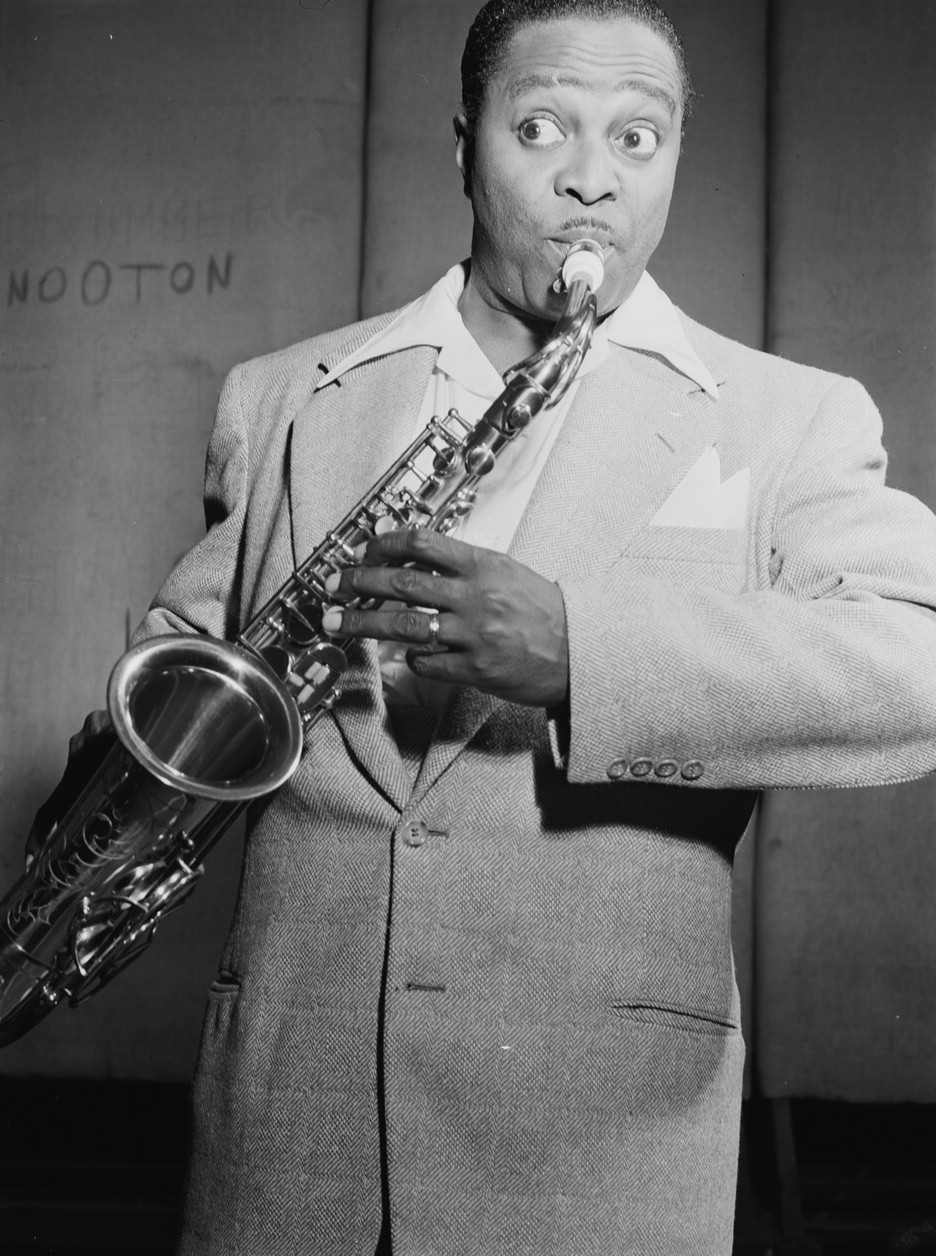
Alto saxophonist Louis Jordan in New York, July 1946

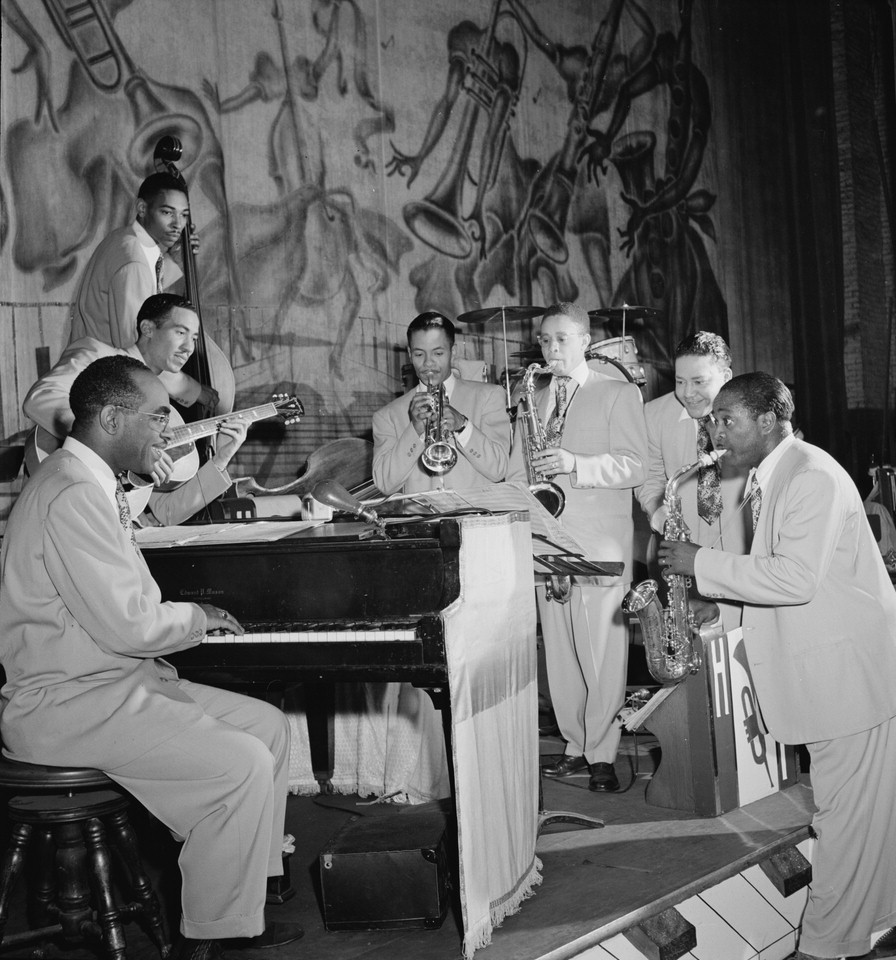
Jordan with his Tympany Five

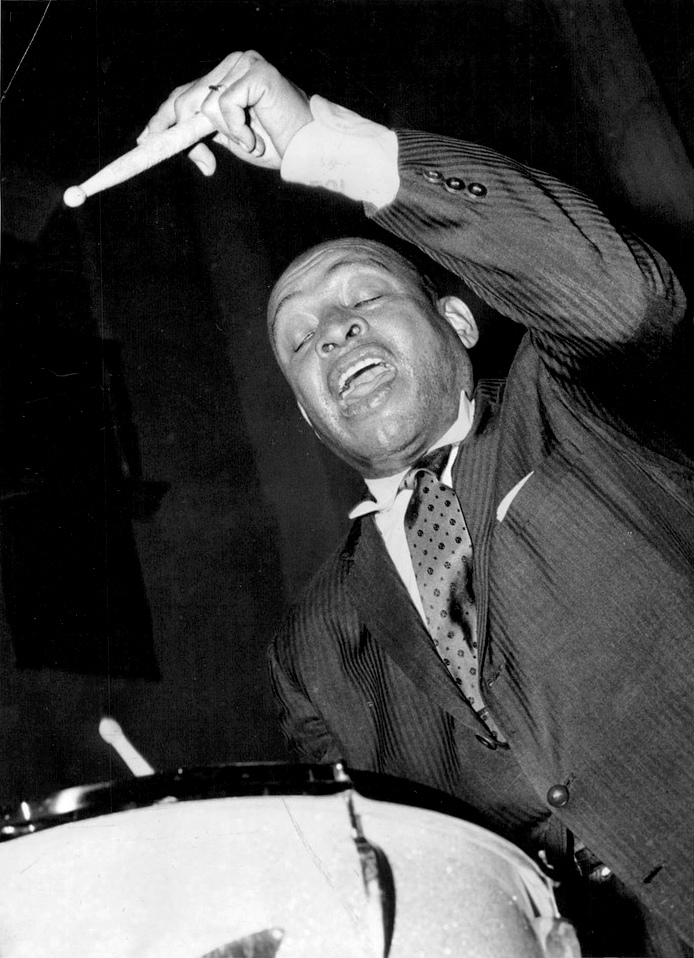
Lionel Hampton

== See also ==
- List of jump blues musicians
