= Bill Flagg =

American country and rockabilly singer

- Born: William R. Flagg; March 11, 1934; Waterville, Maine, U.S.
- Died: November 19, 2024 Southbridge, Massachusetts, U.S.
- Genres: Country; Rockabilly
- Labels: MGM Records; Tetra Records

William R. Flagg (March 11, 1934 – November 19, 2024) was an American country and rockabilly singer, who was the first to use the term rockabilly.

== Life ==
=== Childhood and youth ===
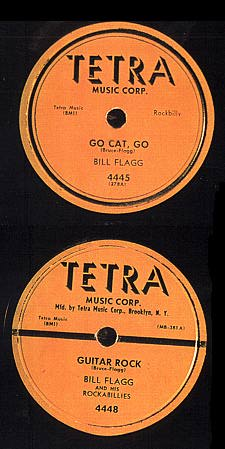
Bill Flagg's records from Tetra Records

Bill Flagg was born and raised in Waterville, Maine. Shortly after the start of World War II, the family moved to Connecticut.

=== Career ===
Flagg began his career in radio as a "singing cowboy" calling himself The Lone Pine Cowboy. He then moved to bluegrass before he and his friend, John Sligar, changed to rockabilly in 1954. Flagg is the first musician known to use this term. The musical style as such had already existed and had been played by musicians such as Hardrock Gunter and Roy Hall. Because of his rising popularity on the radio, he got a recording contract with Tetra Records in New York City. With his band members, Cat Gibson and Ted Barton, henceforth calling themselves The Rockabillies, Flagg recorded his first record in 1956, Howie Stange. The first singles, including Go Cat Go and Guitar Rock, recorded with a contrabass and two acoustic guitars, did not show on the Billboard charts. The records were marketed as "rockbillie" by Tetra.

In 1958, Flagg changed to MGM Records and released his last single. After that, he worked in his family's business and helped his father, who had previously suffered a heart attack. He only appeared in bars on weekends. Twenty-seven years after his musical career, his son, Bob, persuaded him to actively join the music scene again. After that, Flagg started a bluegrass band called Hobo Bill and the Last Ride. Since then, Bill Flagg had again been making appearances in the public.

== Discography ==
Year	Title	Record Company
1956	Go Cat Go / A Good Woman's Leavin'	Tetra Records
1956	Guitar Rock / I'm So Lonely	Tetra Records
1958	Doin' My Time / I Will Always Love You	MGM Records
	Roll In My Sweet Baby's Arms	Tetra Records (not released)
