= Goree Carter =

American drummer

Background information
- Also known as: Little T-Bone; Rocky Thompson; Gory Carter
- Born: Goree Chester Carter or Christer Carter; January 1, 1931; Houston, Texas, United States
- Died: December 27, 1990 (aged 59) Houston, Texas, United States
- Genres: Blues; electric blues; jump blues; Texas blues; rock and roll; boogie-woogie; R&B
- Occupations: Singer; musician; songwriter; soldier
- Instruments: Vocals; guitar; electric guitar; drums
- Years active: 1949–1970
- Label: Freedom Records

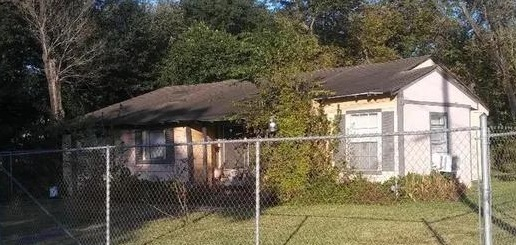
1310 Bayou Street in Houston, Texas.

Goree Chester Carter or Christer Carter (January 1, 1931 – December 27, 1990), was an American singer, guitarist, drummer, and songwriter. He was also credited with the stage names Little T-Bone, Rocky Thompson and Gory Carter, and recorded music in blues genres such as electric blues, jump blues and Texas blues, as well as rock and roll.

He is best known for his 1949 single, "Rock Awhile," which has been cited by several sources as the first rock and roll record, featuring an over-driven electric guitar style similar to that of Chuck Berry years later. Carter recorded "Rock Awhile" at the age of 18, and its rediscovery has posthumously brought him recognition as a forefather of rock and roll. As a young man, he was drafted into the U.S. Army, and was a veteran of the Korean War.

== Biography ==
=== Early life and career ===
Goree Carter was born in Houston, Texas to Robert Lee Carter (1900-1961) and Vader Curtis (1901-1984), who were married in 1920. He was raised in Houston's Fifth Ward, and lived at 1310 Bayou Street. He began playing blues music at the age of 12, and learned to play on a cousin's guitar. Because there were very few guitarists in his area back then, he had no one to teach him how to play the guitar, so he taught himself how to play it by listening to some of his favorite records on a Victrola machine and picking string-by-string on the guitar. He learned a few chords from listening and then learned more about them from a chord book. When he became a teenager, he began earning a living by hoisting sacks at the local Comet Rice Mill. He had a Gibson guitar and began fronting bands in his early teenage years.

=== Goree Carter and His Hepcats ===
In 1949, he and his jump blues band, The Hepcats, also known as Goree Carter and His Hepcats or Goree Carter & His Hepcats, signed with Freedom Records, a local record label set up by Sol Kahal, and recorded the label's first release, "Sweet Ole Woman Blues." Kahal discovered him in either late 1948 or early 1949. As well as Carter's guitar, the band featured two saxophones, a trumpet, piano, bass, and drums. Carter's electric guitar style was influenced by Aaron "T-Bone" Walker, but was over-driven and had a rougher edge which presaged the sound of rock and roll a few years later. His single-string runs and two-string "blue note" chords preceded, and may have influenced, Chuck Berry.

At the age of 18, he recorded his best known single "Rock Awhile" in April 1949. It has been cited as a strong contender for the title of "first rock and roll record" and a "much more appropriate candidate" than the more frequently cited "Rocket 88" (1951) by Jackie Brenston. The intro to "Rock Awhile" resembles those in several later Chuck Berry records from 1955 onwards.

The music historian Robert Palmer regards "Rock Awhile" to be a more appropriate candidate for the "first rock and roll record" title, because it was recorded two years earlier, and because of Carter's guitar work bearing a striking resemblance to Chuck Berry's later guitar work, while making use of an over-driven amplifier, along with the backing of boogie-based rhythms, and the appropriate title and lyrical subject matter. Roger Wood and John Nova Lomax have also cited "Rock Awhile" as the first rock and roll record. Carter wrote and recorded the song at Bill Holford's Audio Company of America. However, "Rock Awhile" was not as commercially successful as later rock and roll records. Nevertheless, he had some moderate success, touring and recording for a while.

=== Korean War and return to Houston ===
According to one source, Goree Carter was drafted for military service in 1950, after completing his most recent recorded song at that time, "Bad Feeling". However, U.S. Veterans' records indicate that he began his service in January 1953, serving until February 1954. He served as a private first class in the U.S. Army infantry during the Korean War. He was in Korea when many of the country's most vicious battles took place. After returning from Korea to Houston, his musical career began declining. Carter recorded for several labels in the early 1950s, including Sittin' in With, Modern, Coral, and Imperial but last recorded in 1954. He wrote a number of songs during this time but said he "tore them up" because record labels would not let him record them, saying he "was ahead of" himself.

=== Later life, death and legacy ===
After leaving the music industry, he continued working at the local Comet Rice Mill until its closure decades later. It is unclear whether Carter ever married, but he did father a daughter, Pamila, in August 1958. He continued to play occasional local gigs in Houston, and sat-in with visiting artist B.B. King; his last live performance was in 1970. He developed arthritis later in his life, and had not been heard from again until 1982, when he was visited at his Fifth Ward home by members of the band the Juke Jumpers. He died in Houston, at the age of 59, in 1990. He died at the same house where he was born, and is buried at the Houston National Cemetery.

Neither his old house at 1310 Bayou or the Audiophile Custom Associates Studio at 612 Westheimer still exist. In fact, Carter is barely remembered even in Houston and The Rock and Roll Hall of Fame has not recognized his contributions. "It’s as if he never lived, never thrilled audiences with his behind-the-back guitar playing, never invented rock and roll", according to a 2014 article.

== Discography ==
=== Compilation album ===
- Rock Awhile (1983)

=== Singles ===
Goree Carter & His Hepcats singles released in 1949:

- "Rock Awhile" b/w "Back Home Blues"
- "I'll Send You" b/w "How Can You Love Me?"
- "Hoy-Hoy" b/w "I Just Thought of You"

Goree Carter songs recorded during 1949-1950 and released during 1949-1951:

- "Love's a Gamble"
- "Christmas Time"
- "Sweet Ole Woman's Blues"
- "My Love is Coming Down"
- "She's Just Old Fashioned"
- "Workin' with My Baby"
- "Is it True?"
- "What a Friend Will Do"
- "She's my Best Bet"
- "Serenade"
- "Come on Let's Boogie"
- "Lonely World"
- "Drunk or Sober"
- "You are my Everything"
- "Every Dog Has His Day"
- "Everybody's Love Crazy"
- "I'm Just Another Fool"
- "If It's True What They Tell Me"
- "Let's Rock"
- "True Love is Hard to Find"
