= Howie Stange =

American singer-songwriter

- Playing the banjo

Background information
- Born: Howard Erwin Stange; March 3, 1924; Meriden Connecticut, United States
- Died: December 4, 1990 (aged 66) Meriden, Connecticut, United States
- Genres: Rockabilly, country
- Occupations: Musician, singer, songwriter, producer
- Instruments: Vocals, piano, rhythm guitar, 5 string banjo, mandolin, harmonica, fiddle
- Years active: 1937–1990
- Labels: JENN, MELL, Frankie, Dee Jay
- Website: realgonedaddyrecords.com

Howard Erwin Stange (March 3, 1924 – December 4, 1990) was an American musician, singer, and pianist who played Rockabilly and Country music, in which possessed a distinctive vocal and playing style. Howie was a musical virtuoso who had the ability to be pick up any instrument and play with a high degree of technical proficiency, despite the fact that he never learned how to read music. Howie was born with four sisters and two brothers who include: Gertrude 'Kiki' Stange, Doris Stange, Frank Anthony Stange, Raymond Christopher Stange, Esther Madelyn Stange and Kathleen Leona Stange. Among the six siblings, only his youngest sister, Kathleen, lives to date, age 85. Howie achieved both national and international fame recognition, for his hit 45 record, "Real Gone Daddy/This Old Bomb of Mine", released in 1957. Regarded as one of the most significant and influential Rockabilly musicians of his era, Howie's music currently resides on over 100 record compilations of the best rockabilly music ever produced. Howie's song "Real Gone Daddy" has achieved "Maybelline" status among fans. Additionally, in 1958 he went on to record "Are You Lonesome To-Night?" which was subsequently picked up by Elvis Presley Are You Lonesome Tonight? (song) who later went on to chart this song at number 1 on the Billboard Charts in 1960. Howie Stange did not achieve significant fame or fortune during his lifetime: however, his music left a lasting impression on a generation of young listeners who were first being introduced to rock and roll music in the 1950s.

== Life and Career (Childhood 1924–1938) ==
Born in Meriden, Connecticut, Howie Stange grew up and lived his entire life in his home town. His family lived a hard-scrabble life; very little to eat, no indoor plumbing, and no money for medical care. Howard suffered from severe asthma, and the family always lived in fear of an asthma attack, for they did not have the $3.00 it cost for a doctor to make a house call. The family survived the Great Depression by hard work and frugality. Howie's father, Thomas Anthony Stange, worked during the 1930s at the Works Progress Administration as a laborer. Prior to this, Thomas spent much of his younger days working the Vaudeville circuit. Thomas started in New York City as a theater foreman, and was able to land himself a stage role, ultimately working alongside Al Jolson's troupe playing the 'end-man' minstrel role. Howie's father was multi-talented, being able to sing, tap, and play a variety of instruments. Thomas also performed "Are You Lonesome Tonight?" with spoken part, as part of his Vaudeville performance. Howie would later find his father's sheet music for "Are You Lonesome Tonight?" while cleaning out the attic and bring it to the next studio session in NYC and convince Jim Flaherty to record the song. Thomas would move to Connecticut in 1916 where he continued to perform in Vaudeville at the Meriden Jacques Opera House and the Leows Poli Palace Theater. Thomas Anthony also appeared on the Major Bowes amateur Hour Edward Bowes as a singer, performing his favorite tune 'I'll Take You Home Again Kathleen'. Music was part of the fabric of the household, with a piano set up in the front room, and dad spending evenings and weekends singing and entertaining his family. His musical talents certainly were passed down to his children, and at a very early age the boys; Frank, Howie, and Raymond, all began to play music. At a very young age, Howie learned the rudiments of playing the guitar from a neighbor, Herbert LaMontagne. Howie attended school at St. Stanislaus School in Meriden for elementary and grammar school. Born a left-hander, the school nuns felt that writing with the left hand was improper, so they would bind Howie's left hand so he couldn't use it, and forced him to write with his right hand. Howie would spend the rest of his life writing with his right hand, and performing all other tasks with his left. Howie's mother, Mary Stange, would work at New Departure , and remained a dutiful wife, mother, and homemaker her entire life. Howie's father died in 1938 when Howie was at the young and impressionable age of 14. His father's death would have a profound impact on young Howie, and shape his life in many ways, from his personal relationships to his love of music.

== Life and Career (Youth 1938–1948) ==
After Thomas died in 1938, Howie left school in pursuit of work after completing eighth grade in order to help support the family. Brothers Frank and Raymond did the same. Howie and his family moved into a fourth floor apartment on top of a grocery store in downtown Meriden. This spot became the neighborhood hangout, as each weekend, the Stange siblings and friends would play music at jam sessions. During these early years, Howie was already expressing exceptionally rare musical talent, and excelled at playing the piano. During the summer of 1940, and free piano was offered to Howie, with the caveat 'if you can get it into the apartment, it's yours.' The boys spent the better part of the afternoon with the window frame removed, hoisting this piano up to the fourth floor apartment on the corner of Cook Ave and Summer Street, above an Italian Restaurant. This musical collaboration amongst the brothers would remain for a lifetime; Frank and Raymond would often join Howie up on stage as well as in the studio. The Stange family musicians had an inauspicious start: Warren Sattler relates a story from 1939, where he competed at a local talent show hosted at a Meriden movie theater, resulted in pitting four-year-old Warren performing yodeling against the three teenage Stange boys performing country music. The young yodeler won out over the Stange family band. The local kids played the usual boyhood activities, such as playing football as part of the 'Acorn' gang, hanging out at Spencer's garage on Main Street, and attending events at the Meriden Boys Club. It was at the Boys Club that Howie took up boxing, a sport he would pursue in earnest after World War II. The start of World War II disrupted Howie's life and propelled him, like many in his generation, to enlist when he turned eighteen. He chose to sign up for the Coast Guard, the same service as his brother Frank. Stationed for two years on Long Island, New York, Howie's time was spent with beach patrols, inspections, training, and drills. It was during this period that Howie married his first love, Jane Webster, on July 15, 1943. Howie and the other men of his unit would let off steam by participating in Coast Guard boxing matches. Howie received a medical discharge from the Coast Guard on January 5, 1944 for chronic asthma. In 1944, Howie settled down with his new family, wife and soon to be two children. During the day Howie worked at New Departure in the guard shack, but his passion at the time was with boxing. Howie was a promising you bantamweight fighter with a strong left punch. He earned the nickname of 'Lefty' during this time which stuck with him for the remainder of his life. Howie was good friends and sparring partner to Joe Coffee. In late 1947 Joe broke his left hand in 2 places in a fight, ending his career. Howie took this as a sign that he too should find other pursuits, as Howie knew that an injury such as Joe suffered would end his musical aspirations.

== Village Playboys (1949–1955) ==
It was during the late 1940s and early 1950s that Howie ventured forth and began his solo act playing at clubs and small venues. His strong vocals and aggressive piano playing style really took the local community by surprise. As his popularity grew, offers of playing in a band soon arrived. Howie's break would come in 1952, when Andy Calabrese, Harold 'Slim' Huntley and Gus French, came looking for a vocalist. The trio had heard of a singer and piano player named Howie Stange. Slim and Gus went in search of Howie to see if they could interest him in joining the band. The two went to visit Howie while he was living in a trailer behind the Greenwood Lodge. Howie did not need much convincing, as he desperately wanted to get out and play his music for the public. Shortly thereafter, Andy left to form his own very successful group, The Top Hatters, and Bob Guyette was recruited, and the Village Playboys were born. Gus played on the big bass, Slim on the rhythm guitar, Bob on the lead guitar, and Howie on the piano, mandolin, rhythm guitar, banjo, fiddle, or vocals, or a combination thereof. Over the next four years, the group would play constantly, mainly in Connecticut and Massachusetts, at any venue they could get booked in. Clubs, diners, halls, auditoriums, restaurants, and family gatherings all became home away from home for the Playboys. The band kept a grueling schedule, with Howie earning $12.00 a show and each of the bandmates $10.00. They would play hour and a half sets, and then help move off all the tables and chairs for dancing the rest of the evening. Over time Robert Kowalczyk, aka Bob 'Cat' Gibson (Bob would go on to play lead guitar for Bill Flagg), came in to replace Bob Guyette.

At this point in time, the type of music being played by the group was very traditional country ballads in the vein of George Jones, Hank Snow and Roy Acuff. The talents Howie possessed were an extremely rare phenomena, especially considering he did not have any formal music training. Howie had perfect pitch, and he could pick up any music by hearing it only once. Howie could play the piano, the Gibson flattop guitar, the fiddle, Gibson mandolin, the five string banjo, harmonica, and provide vocals. Howie was technically proficient, and played his instruments with clean, crisp breaks and a fast play style. He modeled his piano play after Chuck Berry and Jerry Lee Lewis, and his tenor voice was a beautiful cross of George Jones and Elvis Presley. Howie's rendition of "Are You Lonesome To-Night?" is perhaps the finest example of Howie's vocal talents, and his play on the piano is unsurpassed on "This Old Bomb of Mine". Playing at the Mountain View Lodge in 1956 to a packed house, the band performed "What Would You Do If Jesus Came to Your House" for the finale, and when done, the audience was completely silent, in awe of how strong the vocal performance was. Howie then turned back towards the bass player, Gus French, and said, "that is the biggest tribute they [the audience] could ever pay you." Upon hearing this, the audience burst into applause. During this time, Howie struck up a friendship with the Sycz family in Newington, Connecticut. The Sycz's had built a sound studio in their basement, and Howie spent time recording in the studio, often being accompanied by a then teenage Jean Syck (whose later married name was Jean Perron). The Sycz family gave Howie a portable record cutting machine, which from now on accompanied Howie most places, and would serve as the vehicle that created the Howie Stange Music Catalogue. This catalogue is being hosted online at www.realgonedaddyrecords.com.

Many of the venues where rough and tumble joints; for example, the Lake Besek Grill of Middlefield was also known as the 'Bucket of Blood.' It was at one such event that Howie showed just how feisty he could be. A bar patron stood up out of the audience while Howie was playing the piano and began shouting "you knocked out two of my brothers in the boxing ring, and now I'm going to kick your a**!" And with that, the patron came up onto the stage and up and over the piano, and took a mighty swing at Howie, who, without skipping a musical note, raised his left hand off the ivories and gave him a stout left hook right to the head, knocking him off the stage and into the floor speakers, leaving him unconscious. Howie continued right on playing. Another such memorable night happened at the Long Lane Farm School for Girls in Middletown. Being an all-girls school, and one with strict curfews, the students did not have much exposure to neither the opposite sex, nor the new type of music being played, rock and roll. The band played to a packed house, and by the end of the evening it had turned into a riot of screaming girls running to and fro. The Band barely escaped, fleeing in a Cadillac as dawn broke. Howie also possessed a great sense of humor, in one instance, as the set was winding down, an obviously drunk bar patron pulled a gun out and confronted one of the band members. Howie shouted from behind the piano "go ahead and take a swing at 'em, don't worry, he's too chicken to use it". At this point, the patron swung the gun around and pointed it right at Gus French. This distraction enabled others to jump in and subdue the man. In 1955 there was more transition with band members, with Slim Huntley joining the Jim Flaherty's Western Caravan, and Richard N. 'Moon' Burgess Sr. joining up with Howie. Others musicians joined: Pete Hazelwood, Leroy 'Shadow' Dontigney, and Maurice Corely. This new group called themselves the Valley Playboys. Rita Burgess recalled the good times: "it does bring back some good memory's Saturday night at the Shamrock Howie on the piano, Corley on lead guitar Moon on guitar and Shadow on drums. One night there was a fight and they took Leroy Dontigney, "Shadow", drums and all, right out the door and he never stopped playing". The "Shadow" would earn his moniker as one minute he would be there, and the next moment gone. The advent of Moon and the other musicians allowed for a new style of music to emerge, with Moon playing his signature Martin guitar. This new combination of talent brought an entirely different sound to the group. The group was also being influenced by popular culture of the times, with rock and roll splashing all over new radio stations and television stations. A brand of music called Rockabilly was just starting to take off in popularity, and the group began to adopt these sounds. This type of music was being performed by the likes of such artists as Chuck Berry, Bill Flagg, and Elvis Presley.

== Jim Flaherty's Western Caravan (1956–1960) ==
As the Playboys' popularity grew, in 1956 the group was offered a Saturday morning radio show at WMMW 1470 AM. Howie hosted the show and would invite the Village Playboys and other local musicians to come in and play. This exposure at WMMW brought Howie to come into contact with Jim Flaherty. In 1956, Howie was invited to join the Jim Flaherty's Western Caravan, and Howie brought with him Gus French. This group, with manager and lead guitar player Jim Flaherty, would be a significant step-up for Howie from his previous band. Jim was a very popular DJ at WHAY in New Britain, Connecticut, a successful concert promoter, and manager of the popular Belmont Record Shop located on Washington Street in Hartford, Connecticut. Howie played with the Jim Flaherty's Western Caravan, providing lead vocals, and playing instruments as needed, with a particular emphasis on the banjo, piano, and fiddle. The group would tour tirelessly throughout New England during these years and became quite popular. This time in Howie's life was certainly the pinnacle of his commercial and musical career. A dedicated self-promoter, Jim Flaherty secured multiple recording contracts with A&R man Morty Craft in New York City from 1957 through 1960. The band began at Bell Studios as a studio band for other larger acts managed by Morty at the time. Morty was a hard-taskmaster, Gus French recalls "Morty would have us play for 12 hours plus, one day my fingers were bleeding we stayed at it for so long, we asked if we could take a break, Morty replied put some tape on 'em and keep playing.". The working relationship however soon evolved into actual productions by the band on the Indie labels of MELL, JENN, & Frankie. The band would go on to record at the Bell Sound Studios in New York City, with Morty Craft acting as producer. These recordings, beginning with "Real Gone Daddy" began to get much radio airtime throughout New England and put Howie and the band on the map. A total of 4 commercially produced 45's were released during this time. There was even a Howie Stange Fan Club, according to past President Mary Jane Papallo, who fell in love with the music after seeing Howie open for the Everly Brothers. On September 1, 1958 the band opened for the Wilburn Brothers and Johnny Cash at Lake Compounce in Bristol, Connecticut.

As was typical of the practices in the music industry in those days, a song produced by a lesser known band would start to gain air time on the radio, the A&R men would promote that song up to the bigger artists. This was the case with the band's rendition of "Are You Lonesome To-Night?" with vocals by Howie Stange. Howie's version of that song was passed along to Chet Atkins, RCA A&R man, by Jim Flaherty at a DJ Convention in Nashville in November 1959. Chet was the A&R man for Elvis at the time and passed this song along to Elvis for recording. Jim Flaherty had a close working relationship with Elvis's record labels, as letters, in the possession of Jim Flaherty's family, written by the labels in the 1950s attest to. Elvis would go on to send this song to the number 1 spot on the Billboard charts in 1960. Also, producers would 'doctor' the recordings to give them more of a 'commercial' appeal. This can be seen by the Morty Craft produced "Baby I'm Sorry" and "You Never Had It So Good" with vocals by Howie Stange. These two songs were unlike anything produced by the band, and were entirely pop music productions, designed to draw in a larger audience. Dubbed over the original takes were harmonies by the Ray Charles Singers. Morty passed up Howie's particular version of "Baby I'm Sorry" to Ricky Nelson, who then charted the song into Billboard's top 10 Morty also 'sped up' the song of 'Real Gone Daddy' giving it a very up-tempo beat. During 1959, the group's popularity really began to take off. The band appeared twice in 1959 on "The Connecticut Bandstand". The "Bandstand" was a daily TV show that was the forerunner of American Bandstand. Aired by WNHC-TV Channel 8 out of New Haven, it was hosted by Jim Gallant, and featured teenagers dancing while bands performed. Jim Flaherty's Western Caravan performed twice in 1959 to promote their first two recordings, Real Gone Daddy/This Old Bomb Of Mine, and Are You Lonesome To-Night?/My Foolish Heart. During this time, Howie was invited to perform at the Hayloft Jamboree in Boston, Massachusetts as well as the Hayloft Jamboree in Wheeling, West Virginia. He worked side-by-side with such notables as Harkshaw Hawkins, Web Pierce, and Lefty Frizzell. The band also opened for distiniguished acts like Johnny Cash and Dolly Parton. Ultimately, hard work and a hard life, coupled with a new wife and big family, finally took their toll, and in 1960, Howie left the band. The Jim Flaherty's Western Caravan would continue to enjoy much success in the 1960s with two notable lead men, Maury Dubois, who recorded "Am I Losing You" which cracked the Billboard's top 10, and Lou 'Dee' Demaria.

== Personal life ==
Howie married his first wife, as he was leaving the Coast Guard in 1943. They had two children together. Howie earned a living as a buffer and later an engraver with the International Silver Company in Meriden. After that, Howie turned to sales, and worked for the Fuller Brush Company as a door-to-door salesman. He also picked up where he left off with boxing, and became a local boxing champion, http://www.myrecordjournal.com/community/frontporchnews/4100803-129/local-boxing-champions.html fighting in the welterweight division from 1945 to 1948. He was quite the dancer, and known for his fancy footwork in the ring. He was a lefty, and consistently gave his opponents difficult fights. Howie boxed under the name Howie 'Lefty' Stange, and continued to carry the nickname 'Lefty' for the rest of his life. The fights were staged mainly at an outdoor arena on Colony Street, and later Howie would fight at the Meriden City Hall Auditorium and at the Meriden Armory. His marriage unraveled in 1954, as the relationship could not survive the temptations of the road. Howie was known for hard living, and women and booze were easy to come by. Howie married his second wife in 1954. This marriage produced one child. It was during this time that Howie and his family lost many of their personal belongings in a terrible apartment fire, Howie lost many of his musical instruments. Slim Coxx hosted a benefit at an old dance hall in Farmington, Connecticut. Howie had a terrific sense of humor and a story told by Gertrude French illustrates this. in 1959, as a salesman for the Fuller Brush Company, Howie was out driving one day down a long, steep hill, and at the last moment as car turned out in front of him and a fender bender ensued. Howie got out, and checked on the elderly driver of the second car, and the driver exclaimed "I thought I could make it!". Howie would tell this story over and over again and just laugh out loud at what the old man had said. Howie's second marriage did not survive either, and he and his wife divorced in 1959. In 1960, Howie married his third wife, Marion Dickerman, whom he had three children with: Howard Erwin Stange Jr., born November 26, 1961: Stephen Dickerman Stange, born July 24, 1964: and Raymond Enos Stange, born on September 1, 1965. The obligations of three marriages and six children finally caught up to Howie, and in 1960, he left the Jim Flaherty's Western Caravan to focus on his family life. He would turn his energies to becoming a car salesman. Howie was quite successful at this, winning multiple awards and earning the title of 'New England Car Salesman of the Year' and a large celebration up in Boston. Howie retired from his job in 1985. Howie continued to play music in his leisure time, but his music was limited to weekends at a local Meriden venues or in the summers out at Lake Beseck in Middletown, Connecticut, joining on-stage such performers like Slim Coxx. Howie's third marriage would also end in divorce in 1970. Howie married his fourth and final wife in 1970. They would have one child together. Howie also adopted the daughter of his fourth wife. This marriage would be the one that lasted, and Howie remained married to her until his death in 1990. Howie Stange left a positive, long-lasting impression on men and women across America. Two men in particular owe much in their life to Howie: Dave Cook and Warren Cyr http://www.acousticguitarcommunity.com/profile/WarrenCyr. Dave Cook played with Howie during the WMMW radio show throughout the 1950s and Howie provided the inspiration that led Dave to a life of music and playing in his own bands for over twenty five years, 'Big John & The Western Ramblers.' Howie, Dave once said, "He was a hero, a wonderful man, and a man who inspired me for the remainder of my life." And Warren Cyr, who said "Howie was a real country gentleman. I never heard a cuss word from him. Your dad and Dave Cook introduced me to Johnny Cash and inspired me to learn to play the guitar, teach guitar for many years, and as a result succeed in life. I was influenced by Howie: may he be blessed." Howie Stange was also quick to praise, as country music performer Warren Sattler relates an incident in his early career, when Howie ran into Warren at the Oyster Bay restaurant in Meriden, "Warren", said Howie, "what the he** are you still doing here. I thought you would be in Nashville by now".

== Recordings ==
Record Labels MELL, JENN, Frankie, Horizons Unlimited, & Dee Jay. Affiliation Labels included Village Playboys & Jim Flaherty's Western Caravan & Howie and the Gang. Howie Stange's discography includes 5 releases:

- JENN Records released 1957

Side 1 Real Gone Daddy J101 (J1001), vocals Howie Stange Side 2 This Old Bomb Of Mine J101 (J1002)(J-101 & 102), vocals Howie Stange

- Frankie Records released 1958

Side 1 Are You Lonesome To-Night? FR-7 (HB-276), vocals Howie Stange Side 2 My Foolish Heart FR-7 (HB-277), vocals Morey Dubois

- MELL Records released 1959

Side 1 You Never Had It So Good 120 (1039), vocals Howie Stange Side 2 Baby I'm Sorry 120 (1040), vocals Howie Stange

- MELL Records released 1959

Side 1 Am I Losing You 121 (1041), vocals Morey Dubois Side 2 If You Can Spare The Time 121 (1042), vocals Morey Dubois

- Horizons Unlimited Records released 1964

Side 1 The Girl I Loved For A Time U1030, vocals Lou Dee Side 2 This Honky Tonk Is Home Sweet Home U1030, vocals Lou Dee

- Dee Jay Records (DJ-45-215-A & B) re-release on a West German record label Real Gone Daddy/This Old Bomb of Mine 1982

Typical Playlist would include the following: "Davey Crocket", "Beware, It's Love", Instrumental selections,"What Would You Do If Jesus Came To Your House", "I've Lived A Lot In My Time", "Wait Of A Woman", "Born To Be Happy", "Sag, Drag, And Fall", "Let Me Love You", "Where Does A Broken Heart Go", "How's The World Treating You", "Am I The One", "Do Not Forsake Me Oh My Darling", "Rose Of El Paso", "John Henry", "Precious Jewel", "When I Go To Heaven Mamma", "Flame In My Heart", "Two Different Worlds", "Loose Talk", "Real Gone Daddy", "This Old Bomb Of Mine","Baby I'm Sorry", "You Never Had It So Good", "Are You Lonesome To-Night?", "Fraulin", "Winner", "Alabama Jubilee", and his signature song "Keep A Light In Your Window Tonight".

Howie Stange opened for the following artists: Johnny Cash, Dolly Parton, Elton Britt, Everly Brothers, Rusty & Doug Kershaw, Faron Young, Hank Snow, Hawkshaw Hawkins, Patsy Cline, Little Jimmie Dickens, Loretta Lynn, Grandpa Jones, Minnie Pearl, Porter Wagoner, Gordon Terry, Marvin Rainwater, The Wilburn Brothers, Mac Wiseman, Buck Owens, Jimmy Stevens, & Jimmy Brown.

== Association ==
Howie performed with many country music artists, such as, Robert Kowalczyk "aka" Bob Cat Gibson; Bob Guyette; Leroy "aka" Shadow Dontigney; Robert McCarthy, "aka" Moose Roberts; Gus French; Billy Brittany; Harold Slim Huntley; Don Johnson; Dave Cook; Andy Calabrese; Jimmy Stephens; Lou Dee Demaria; Maury DuBois; Smokey Joe Tyler; Maurice Corley; Pete Hazelwood; Charlie Shefcyk; Patti Martin; Richard Moon Burgess; Rocky Chase; Smilin' Jim Flaherty; Don & Sibil Richard; Jean Perron; Slim Coxx; Dave Cooke; Paul McCoy; Frank & Raymond Stange; & Bill Flagg.

== Later years and death (1960–1990) ==
After leaving the Jim Flaherty's Western Caravan, Howie worked in the 1960s with various artists under the Howie Stange & the Gang, later just Howie Stange, a one-man show. Howie remained a very popular performer in central Connecticut. He would say that "he would rather be a big fish in a small pond." Fame eluded Howie, and certainly his life-style did not help. Howie said once that "fame is just a matter of timing," This comment can be interpreted that he came so very close to reaching new heights in the music industry. Howie spent his remaining years in pursuit of his other passions, in particular, fishing. He also enjoyed playing the piano regularly out at restaurants and bars in Meriden, enjoying his family, as well as entertaining at home. Howie Stange died on December 4, 1990 at the age 66 surrounded by his family.

== Legacy ==
Howie's legacy endures as a Rockabilly music artist and as a performer. Howie Stange's music is more popular now than in his lifetime, played on oldies record stations throughout the country and in much of Europe. Howie performed music his entire life. In local venues such as clubs, restaurants, bars, and pubs, he sang to local crowds that loved to hear him play. His song, "Real Gone Daddy" is perhaps the finest piece of Rockabilly music of all time, and has led to Howie's recent induction into the Rockabilly Hall Of Fame on March 1, 2014, http://www.rockabillyhall.org/. An accomplished musician, Howie's talent exceeded many of those more famous than he: "He would bang those piano keys that would make Jerry Lee Lewis look sad," recounted Pete Hazelwood. Those who knew him best in the music industry would call him 'Godfather' or just 'Dad' in respect for his many years of music contribution in the state of Connecticut. Recently, a treasure trove of studio out-takes and demo records have been discovered, and the Howie Stange Music Catalogue now exists. The project of professionally restoring this music, some of which was in a very poor state, was overseen by Cristian Coban, Ph.D., CVC Productions, at http://www.lp2cd.com. Coupled with the five commercially released singles of Howie, over 100 songs are now featured in the "Catalogue". When Howie opened for Johnny Cash on May 30, 1964 at the Massachusetts Arena, Boston, Warren Cyr is quoted as saying that, "Howie stole the show." Howie's legacy has been memorialized by those who knew him best, his country music fans. Howie was inducted into the Connecticut County Music Association Hall of Fame, in December 2004. In modern culture, the song "Real Gone Daddy" has been featured by NASCAR in a biography of Junior Johnson and also in Hot Rod magazine feature of a 1949 Cadillac.

== Discography of 45 Records ==
Studio albums

- Real Gone Daddy/This Old Bomb Of Mine (1957)
- Real Gone Daddy vocals Howie Stange, guitar intro Jim Flaherty, guitar break 'Moose' Roberts, lead guitar Jim Flaherty, bass guitar Gus French, rhythm guitar Maury Dubois, piano Howie Stange
- This Old Bomb Of Mine vocals Howie Stange, guitar intro Jim Flaherty, harmony Gus French, bass guitar Gus French, rhythm guitar Maury Dubois, 'Moose' Roberts & Jim Flaherty, piano Howie Stange
- Are You Lonesome To-Night?/My Foolish Heart (1958)
- Are You Lonesome Tonight? vocals Howie Stange, melody Jim Flaherty, guitar intro 'Moose' Roberts, bass guitar Gus French, rhythm guitar Howie Stange, control room Maury Dubois
- My Foolish Heart vocals Maury Dubois, melody Jim Flaherty, guitar break 'Moose' Roberts, lead guitar Jim Flaherty, bass guitar Gus French, rhythm guitar Howie Stange & Maury Dubois
- Baby I'm Sorry/You Never Had It So Good (1959)
- Baby I'm Sorry vocals Howie Stange, melody Jim Flaherty, guitar intro Jim Flaherty, guitar break 'Moose' Roberts, lead guitar Jim Flaherty, bass guitar Gus French, rhythm guitar Maury Dubois
- You Never Had It So Good vocals Howie Stange, harmony Ray Charles Singers, guitar break 'Moose' Roberts, lead guitar Jim Flaherty, bass guitar Gus French, rhythm guitar Maury Dubois, brushes Maury Dubois
- Am I Losing You/If You Can Spare The Time (1959)
- Am I Losing You vocals Maury Dubois, harmony Ray Charles Singers, guitar break 'Moose' Roberts, lead guitar Jim Flaherty, bass guitar Gus French, rhythm guitar Maury Dubois, piano Howie Stange
- If You Can Spare The Time vocals Maury Dubois, guitar intro Jim Flaherty, brushes Howie Stange, guitar break 'Moose' Roberts, lead guitar Jim Flaherty, bass guitar Gus French, rhythm guitar Howie Stange & Maury Dubois
- The Girl I Loved For A Time/This Honky Tonk Is Home Sweet Home (1964)
- The Girl I Loved For A Time vocals Lou Dee, piano Howie Stange
- This Honky Tonk Is Home Sweet Home vocals Lou Dee, piano Howie Stange
- Real Gone Daddy/This Old Bomb of Mine (1982 re-release Dee Jay Records)
