= The Billboard =

Coordinates: 77°4′21″S 145°41′18″W

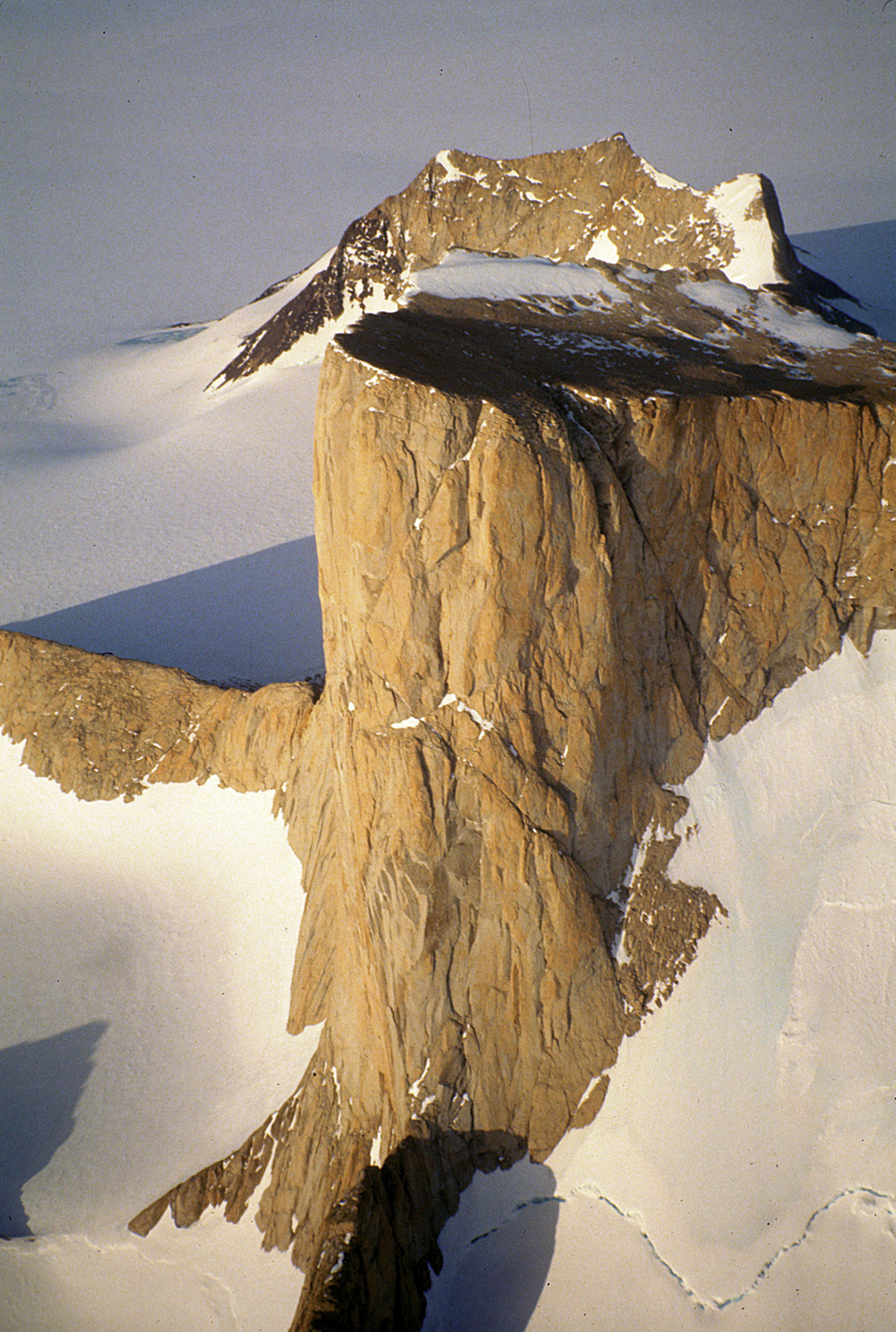
- View from a helicopter of the Billboard looking northwest.

Highest point
- Elevation: Altitudes by barometers calibrated by differential GPS. (ref. 3)

Geography
- Location: Marie Byrd Land, West Antarctica

Geology
- Rock age: Cretaceous

Climbing
- First ascent: December 8, 1999. Mike Roberts, Louis Sass, Seth Cowdery, John Stone, Christine Siddoway

The Billboard is a massive granite monolith in the Sarnoff Mountains of the Ford Ranges of Marie Byrd Land, West Antarctica, standing just west of Mount Rea between Arthur Glacier and Boyd Glacier.

== History ==
It was discovered in November 1934 by a Second Byrd Antarctic Expedition (1933–35) sledge party under Paul Siple, and is so named because of its form and appearance with vertical faces rising above the continental ice.

The summit was first visited by Bruce Luyendyk and Kuno Lecha by helicopter piloted by Colin Hardiman in January 1993 during expedition GANOVEX VII. In 1998–99, Christine Siddoway led a geological party from Colorado College that reached the summit by climbing a west route.

== Geology ==
The Billboard is composed of Cretaceous Byrd Coast granite. It is topped by an erosion surface that reaches an elevation of 793 metres (2,602 ft), which is about 700 metres (2,300 ft) above the outlet glacier below. The surface lacks glacial erosion features; however erratics found on the surface provide evidence of overriding by cold-based glacier ice. Features of prolonged surface weathering in a sub-aerial environment are sheeting and weathering pits.
