= Milord (album) =

Studio album by Dalida
- Released: 1960
- Recorded: 1959–60
- Language: Italian
- Labels: Barclay; Jolly Hi-Fi

Dalida chronology
| Les Enfants du Pirée (1960) | Milord (1960) | Elle, lui et l'autre.... (1960) |

Milord is an Italian compilation by Dalida. It contains her Italy's Top 10 hits like "Milord", "Gli zingari", "Uno a te uno a me" (also as "I ragazzi del Pireo"), and "Pezzettini di bikini".

== Track listing ==
Barclay & Jolly Hi-Fi Records – LPJ 5018,

Side one
| No. | Title | Writer(s) | Length |
|---|---|---|---|
| 1. | "Milord" | Georges Moustaki, Gian Carlo Testoni & Marguerite Monnot |
| 2. | "Scoubidou" | Maurice Tézé, Giuseppe Perotti & Sacha Distel |
| 3. | "Gli zingari" | Hubert Giraud, Leo Chiosso & Pierre Cour |
| 4. | "T'amerò dolcemente" | André Salvet, Antonietta De Simone & Jacques Plait |
| 5. | "L'arlecchino gitano" | Hubert Giraud & Jean Dréjac |
| 6. | "L'acqua viva" | Guy Béart & Giacomo Mario Gili |

Side two
| No. | Title | Writer(s) | Length |
|---|---|---|---|
| 1. | "Uno a te uno a me" (Les Enfants du Pirée) | Manos Hadjidakis |
| 2. | "Pezzettini di bikini" | Gian Carlo Testoni & Lee Pockriss |
| 3. | "Love in Portofino" | Fred Buscaglione & Leo Chiosso |
| 4. | "O sole mio" | Eduardo di Capua |
| 5. | "La canzone d'Orfeo" | François Llenas & Marcel Camus |
| 6. | "Il venditore di felicità" | Giorgio Calabrese, Jean Broussolle & Jean-Pierre Calvet |

== See also ==
- Dalida albums discography

== Sources ==
- L'argus Dalida: Discographie mondiale et cotations, by Daniel Lesueur, Éditions Alternatives, 2004. ISBN 2-86227-428-3 and ISBN 978-2-86227-428-7.
