= Love in Portofino (album) =

Love in portofino

Studio album by Dalida
- Released: December 1959; 65 years ago March 1960 (Reissued); 2004 (Reissued)
- Recorded: July – December 1959
- Studio: Hoche
- Genre: Pop standard; easy listening; rock and roll; doo-wop; bossa nova
- Length: 25:57
- Language: French and Italian
- Label: Barclay
- Producer: Eddie Barclay

Dalida albums chronology
Le disque d'or de Dalida (1959)	Love in portofino (1959)	Les enfants du Pirée (1960)

Love in Portofino is the sixth and last studio album of 1950s by French singer Dalida. It was released in December 1959 through Barclay Records.

The album consists of mostly original songs by Dalida, while four of them are covers of foreign hits. All tracks are based on vocally highlighted pop standard, some of them mixed with Rock and roll or Bossa nova.

The album positively reviewed by music critics and Dalida was again praised for her "passionate performance", especially for "La chanson d'Orpheé. It reached top of album charts and was the best selling album released in France in 1959, alongside Le disque d'or de Dalida.

== Background ==
For the first time Dalida presented more songs originally written for her, than covers of foreign hits. All of them were top 20 hits.

Covering "Marina", she brought Italian language hit to French public, but the "Ne joue pas" was already a French song originally recorded by Colette Deréal the same year. "J'ai rêvé" is a cover of Rock and roll US hit "Dream lover" and "La chanson d'Orpheé" is the Bossa nova theme song of Orfeu Negro. The first such in Dalida's repertoire, she expressed her own admiration of the song including it in several compilation albums in future decades. She also recorded an Italian version that peaked at number ten in Italy.

The title song "Love in Portofino" was released prior to the album. It was immediately covered by several French and Italian artists under the same name or as "A San Cristina". In hope of attracting more sales, "A San Cristina" was included in the album's name. The song wasn't big sales success, but nevertheless in future it became iconized as hymn of Portofino and well remembered by the local public, also being covered by Andrea Bocelli.

On the album, "Elle, lui et l'autre" was issued for the first time and went on to become Canadian number one hit and produced the eponymous album.

The album was completely recorded in Studio Hoche in Paris, under orchestra conduction of Raymond Lefèvre, and was released in early December 1959 in 25 cm (10 inch) format under catalog number 80 115. In 2004, Barclay Records, then as part of Universal Music France, reissued the album in original vinyl format and a digitally remastered version in CD, both with original cover art and track list.

The first issue sold over 20 000 copies and reissue in 1960 additional 10 000. The retrospective reissue of 2004 sold all 8,500 numbered copies, adding up to total sales that surpass 40,000 units, making the album one of best selling French albums of 1950s.

== Track listing ==
Side one
No.	Title	Writer(s)	Length
1.	"Love in Portofino"	Fred Buscaglione, Jacques Larue & Leo Chiosso	3:15
2.	"C'est ça l'amore"	Jean Broussolle & Pino Massara	2:56
3.	"Adonis"	Fernand Bonifay & George Goehring	2:20
4.	"Pilou Pilou Hé" (Au pays qu'à un joli nom)	Gilbert Bécaud & Louis Amade	2:20
5.	"Marina"	Jean Broussolle & Rocco Granata	2:00

Side two
No.	Title	Writer(s)	Length
1.	"Ne joue pas"	A. J. Marotta, Guy Hemric & Jean Constantin	1:46
2.	"Luna Caprese"	Georges Gosset & Luigi Ricciardi	3:22
3.	"J'ai rêvé"	Bobby Darin & Georges Aber	2:30
4.	"La chanson d'Orphée" (Manha De Carnaval)	Antônio Maria, François Llenas, Luiz Bonfá & Marcel Camus	2:50
5.	"Elle, lui et l'autre"	Albert Beach, Guy Wood & René Rouzaud	2:38
Total length:			25:57

== See also ==
- Dalida discography
