= Elle, lui et l'autre.... =

Studio album by Dalida
- Released: 1960
- Recorded: 1959–1960
- Genres: Jazz; pop; exotica; easy listening

Dalida chronology
Milord (1960)	Elle, lui et l'autre.... (1960)	Dalida internationale (1961)

Elle, lui et l'autre.... is the ninth studio album by Italian-French vocalist Dalida. It was released in 1960. It was her second released exclusively to the Canadian public.

== History ==
In the two years prior to the release, Dalida released twelve songs, among which are her international hits "T'aimer follement", "Romantica", "Itsi bitsi petit bikini", "O sole mio" and "Les Enfants du Pirée".

The album yielded the successful song "Elle lui et l'autre", which topped Canadian charts, and "Bras dessus, bras dessous", which became the theme song of the eponymous Canadian TV show.

== Track listing ==
- Elle, lui et l'autre
- T'aimer follement
- Dans les rues de Bahia
- Tintarella di luna
- L'Arlequin de Tolède
- Romantica
- Itsi bitsi petit bikini
- Comme au premier jour
- Ni chaud, ni froid
- O sole mio
- Bras dessus, bras dessous
- Les Enfants du Pirée

== See also ==
- Dalida discography
