= List of number-one singles of 1961 (France) =

This is a list of the French singles & airplay chart reviews number-ones of 1961.

== Number-ones by week ==
=== Singles chart ===
Week	Issue date	Artist(s)	Song	Ref.
1	2 January	Dalida	"Itsy Bitsy Petit Bikini"	
2	9 January	Johnny Hallyday	"Kili Watch"	
3	16 January	André Verchuren	"Les Fiancés D'auvergne"	
4	23 January	Édith Piaf	"Non, je ne regrette rien"	
5	30 January	Édith Piaf	"Non, je ne regrette rien"	
6	6 February	Édith Piaf	"Non, je ne regrette rien"	
7	13 February	Richard Anthony	"Tu Parles Trop "	
8	20 February	Richard Anthony	"Tu Parles Trop "	
9	27 February	Édith Piaf	Non, je ne regrette rien"	
10	6 March	Richard Anthony	"Tu Parles Trop "	
11	13 March	André Verchuren	"Les Fiancés D'auvergne"	
12	20 March	André Verchuren	"Les Fiancés D'auvergne"	
13	27 March	André Verchuren	"Les Fiancés D'auvergne"	
14	3 April	André Verchuren	"Les Fiancés D'auvergne"	
15	10 April	André Verchuren	"Les Fiancés D'auvergne"	
16	17 April	André Verchuren	"Les Fiancés D'auvergne"	
17	24 April	André Verchuren	"Les Fiancés D'auvergne"	
18	1 May	André Verchuren	"Les Fiancés D'auvergne"	
19	8 May	André Verchuren	"Les Fiancés D'auvergne"	
20	15 May	André Verchuren	"Les Fiancés D'auvergne"	
21	22 May	André Verchuren	"Les Fiancés D'auvergne"	
22	29 May	André Verchuren	"Les Fiancés D'auvergne"	
23	5 June	André Verchuren	"Les Fiancés D'auvergne"	
24	12 June	Édith Piaf	"Non, je ne regrette rien"	
25	19 June	Édith Piaf	"Non, je ne regrette rien"	
26	26 June	Édith Piaf	"Non, je ne regrette rien"	
27	3 July	Jean-Claude Pascal	"Nous les amoureux"	
28	10 July	Jean-Claude Pascal	"Nous les amoureux"	
29	17 July	Jean-Claude Pascal	"Nous les amoureux"	
30	24 July	Jean-Claude Pascal	"Nous les amoureux"	
31	31 July	Jean-Claude Pascal	"Nous les amoureux"	
32	7 August	André Verchuren	"Les fiancés d'Auvergne"	
33	14 August	André Verchuren	"Les fiancés d'Auvergne"	
34	21 August	André Verchuren	"Les fiancés d'Auvergne"	
35	28 August	Charles Aznavour	"Il faut savoir"	
36	4 September	Charles Aznavour	"Il faut savoir"	
37	11 September	Les Chaussettes Noires	"Daniela"	
38	18 September	Les Chaussettes Noires	"Daniela"	
39	25 September	Les Chaussettes Noires	"Daniela"	
40	2 October	Les Compagnons de la chanson	" La Marche Des Anges "	
41	9 October	Les Compagnons de la chanson	" La Marche Des Anges "	
42	16 October	Les Compagnons de la chanson	" La Marche Des Anges "	
43	23 October	Les Compagnons de la chanson	" La Marche Des Anges "	
44	30 October	Les Compagnons de la chanson	" La Marche Des Anges "	
45	6 November	Les Compagnons de la chanson	" La Marche Des Anges "	
46	13 November	Johnny Hallyday	"Viens Danser Le Twist"	
47	20 November	Johnny Hallyday	"Viens Danser Le Twist"	
48	27 November	Johnny Hallyday	"Viens Danser Le Twist"	
49	4 December	Johnny Hallyday	"Viens Danser Le Twist"	
50	11 December	Henri Tisot	"L'Auto-circulation	
51	18 December	Henri Tisot	"L'Auto-circulation	
52	25 December	Henri Tisot	"L'Auto-circulation	

== See also ==
- 1961 in music
- List of number-one hits (France)
