= List of number-one singles of 1960 (Canada) =

The following is a list of the CHUM Chart number-one singles of 1960.

Issue date	Song	Artist	Reference
January 4	"Running Bear"	Johnny Preston	
January 11	"Running Bear"	Johnny Preston	
January 18	"Go, Jimmy, Go"	Jimmy Clanton	
January 25	"Go, Jimmy, Go"	Jimmy Clanton	
February 1	"Teen Angel"	Mark Dinning	
February 8	"He'll Have to Go"	Jim Reeves	
February 15	"He'll Have to Go"	Jim Reeves	
February 22	"He'll Have to Go"	Jim Reeves	
February 29	"He'll Have to Go"	Jim Reeves	
March 7	"He'll Have to Go"	Jim Reeves	
March 14	"He'll Have to Go"	Jim Reeves	
March 21	"Beatnik Fly"	Johnny and the Hurricanes	
March 28	"Beatnik Fly"	Johnny and the Hurricanes	
April 4	"Beatnik Fly"	Johnny and the Hurricanes	
April 11	"Sink the Bismark"	Johnny Horton	
April 18	"Stuck On You"	Elvis Presley	
April 25	"Stuck On You"	Elvis Presley	
May 2	"Stuck On You"	Elvis Presley	
May 9	"The Old Lamplighter"	The Browns	
May 16	"Paper Roses"	Anita Bryant	
May 23	"Paper Roses"	Anita Bryant	
May 30	"He'll Have to Stay"	Jeanne Black	
June 6	"My Old Man's a Dustman"	Lonnie Donegan	
June 13	"My Old Man's a Dustman"	Lonnie Donegan	
June 20	"Everybody's Somebody's Fool"	Connie Francis	
June 27	"Everybody's Somebody's Fool"	Connie Francis	
July 4	"Please Help Me, I'm Falling'"	Hank Locklin	
July 11	"Please Help Me, I'm Falling'"	Hank Locklin	
July 18	"Itsy Bitsy Teenie Weenie Yellow Polkadot Bikini"	Brian Hyland	
July 25	"Itsy Bitsy Teenie Weenie Yellow Polkadot Bikini"	Brian Hyland	
August 1	"Itsy Bitsy Teenie Weenie Yellow Polkadot Bikini"	Brian Hyland	
August 8	"It's Now or Never" / "A Mess of Blues"	Elvis Presley	
August 15	"It's Now or Never" / "A Mess of Blues"	Elvis Presley	
August 22	"It's Now or Never" / "A Mess of Blues"	Elvis Presley	
August 29	"Walk, Don't Run'"	The Ventures	
September 5	"Walk, Don't Run'"	The Ventures	
September 12	"The Wreck of the John B"	Jimmie Rodgers	
September 19	"The Wreck of the John B"	Jimmie Rodgers	
September 26	"The Wreck of the John B"	Jimmie Rodgers	
October 3	"Let's Think About Living'"	Bob Luman	
October 10	"Let's Think About Living'"	Bob Luman	
October 17	"Let's Think About Living'"	Bob Luman	
October 24	"Save the Last Dance for Me'"	The Drifters	
October 31	"Sailor (Your Home is the Sea)'"	Lolita	
November 7	"Sailor (Your Home is the Sea)'"	Lolita	
November 14	"North to Alaska'"	Johnny Horton	
November 21	"North to Alaska'"	Johnny Horton	
November 28	"Are You Lonesome Tonight?'"	Elvis Presley	
December 5	"Wonderland by Night'"	Bert Kaempfert	
December 12	"Wonderland by Night'"	Bert Kaempfert	
December 19	"Wonderland by Night'"	Bert Kaempfert	
December 26	"Wonderland by Night'"	Bert Kaempfert	

== See also ==
- 1960 in music
