= Floyd Robinson (singer) =

American country singer-songwriter (1932–2016)

- Robinson c. 1950s

Background information
- Birth name: Floyd Eugene Robinson
- Born: August 10, 1932; Nashville, Tennessee, U.S.
- Died: May 28, 2016 (aged 83); Hendersonville, Tennessee, U.S.
- Genres: Country; rockabilly
- Years active: 1954–2016
- Labels: King, RCA Victor, Dot, Jamie, Groove

Floyd Eugene Robinson (August 10, 1932 – May 28, 2016) was an American singer, born in Nashville, Tennessee, who was briefly successful in the late 1950s.

== Career ==
=== Music ===
Robinson's music was similar stylistically to that of John D. Loudermilk, and Robinson, like Loudermilk, worked as a songwriter. Among his songwriting contributions was "The Little Space Girl", a hit for his cousin, Jesse Lee Turner. Robinson recorded for King Records (1954), RCA Victor, Dot, Jamie, and Groove over the course of his career, and released a full-length album on RCA. He scored one hit single in the US, "Makin' Love", which reached No. 27 on the Billboard Black Singles chart, and No. 20 on the Billboard Hot 100 in 1959. The track reached No. 9 in the UK Singles Chart the same year.

In the US, "Makin' Love" was controversial because of its suggestive sexual content and many radio stations pulled it from the airwaves after only a few weeks.

Golden Sandy Records released a compilation album of Robinson's recorded output, including his entire 1959 full-length, on CD in 1994.

=== Other ===
From approximately 1973 to 1977, Robinson recorded and released religious-themed children's albums, as characters Charlie the Hamster, Ricky the Cricket, and Woody Woodchuck.

In the 1990s Robinson self-published two books, the instruction manual Guitar Playing Made Easy (1992), and the novel The Guitar (1994). He owned a used car dealership, but remained active in the music industry.

Robinson died on May 28, 2016, in Hendersonville, Tennessee, after a long illness, at age 83.
