= List of Cash Box Top 100 number-one singles of 1960 =

These are the songs that reached number one on the Top 100 Best Sellers chart in 1960 as published by Cash Box magazine.

Issue date	Song	Artist
January 2	Why	Frankie Avalon
January 9	Why	Frankie Avalon
January 16	Why	Frankie Avalon
January 23	Running Bear	Johnny Preston
January 30	Running Bear	Johnny Preston
February 6	Running Bear	Johnny Preston
February 13	Teen Angel	Mark Dinning
February 20	Teen Angel	Mark Dinning
February 27	Theme from "A Summer Place"	Percy Faith & Orchestra
March 5	Theme from "A Summer Place"	Percy Faith & Orchestra
March 12	Theme from "A Summer Place"	Percy Faith & Orchestra
March 19	Theme from "A Summer Place"	Percy Faith & Orchestra
March 26	Theme from "A Summer Place"	Percy Faith & Orchestra
April 2	Theme from "A Summer Place"	Percy Faith & Orchestra
April 9	Theme from "A Summer Place"	Percy Faith & Orchestra
April 16	Theme from "A Summer Place"	Percy Faith & Orchestra
April 23	Stuck On You	Elvis Presley
April 30	Stuck On You	Elvis Presley
May 7	Stuck On You	Elvis Presley
May 14	Stuck On You	Elvis Presley
May 21	Cathy's Clown	The Everly Brothers
May 28	Cathy's Clown	The Everly Brothers
June 4	Cathy's Clown	The Everly Brothers
June 11	Cathy's Clown	The Everly Brothers
June 18	Cathy's Clown	The Everly Brothers
June 25	Everybody's Somebody's Fool	Connie Francis
July 2	Everybody's Somebody's Fool	Connie Francis
July 9	Everybody's Somebody's Fool	Connie Francis
July 16	Alley Oop	The Hollywood Argyles, Dante & the Evergreens
July 23	I'm Sorry	Brenda Lee
July 30	I'm Sorry	Brenda Lee
August 6	Itsy Bitsy Teenie Weenie Yellow Polka Dot Bikini	Brian Hyland
August 13	It's Now or Never	Elvis Presley
August 20	It's Now or Never	Elvis Presley
August 27	It's Now or Never	Elvis Presley
September 3	It's Now or Never	Elvis Presley
September 10	The Twist	Chubby Checker
September 17	The Twist	Chubby Checker
September 24	The Twist	Chubby Checker
October 1	The Twist	Chubby Checker
October 8	My Heart Has a Mind of Its Own	Connie Francis
October 15	Save the Last Dance for Me	The Drifters
October 22	Save the Last Dance for Me	The Drifters
October 29	Save the Last Dance for Me	The Drifters
November 5	Save the Last Dance for Me	The Drifters
November 12	Save the Last Dance for Me	The Drifters
November 19	Save the Last Dance for Me	The Drifters
November 26	Are You Lonesome Tonight?	Elvis Presley
December 3	Are You Lonesome Tonight?	Elvis Presley
December 10	Are You Lonesome Tonight?	Elvis Presley
December 17	Are You Lonesome Tonight?	Elvis Presley
December 24	Are You Lonesome Tonight?	Elvis Presley
December 31	Are You Lonesome Tonight?	Elvis Presley

== See also ==
- 1960 in music
- List of Hot 100 number-one singles of 1960 (U.S.)
