= Never on Sunday (song) =

1960 song by Manos Hatzidakis

- 2002 remastered single

Single by Melina Mercouri

from the album Never on Sunday
- B-side: "Hasapico" (Manos Hatzidakis)
- Released: 1 October 1960
- Recorded: 1960
- Label: United Artists
- Songwriter: Manos Hatzidakis
- Producer: Jack Lewis

"Never on Sunday"

Single by Don Costa
- B-side: "The Sound of Love"
- Released: July 25, 1960
- Recorded: 1960
- Genre: Instrumental
- Length: 3:01
- Label: United Artists
- Songwriter: Manos Hatzidakis
- Producer: Don Costa

"Never on Sunday"

Single by The Chordettes

from the album Never on Sunday
- B-side: "Faraway Star"
- Released: May 1961
- Recorded: 1961
- Genre: Traditional pop
- Length: 2:40
- Label: Cadence
- Songwriters: Manos Hatzidakis; Billy Towne

The Chordettes singles chronology
"A Broken Vow" (1960)	"Never on Sunday" (1961)	"Faraway Star" (1961)

"Never on Sunday", also known by its original Greek title "Ta Pediá tou Pireá" ("Τα Παιδιά του Πειραιά", 'The Children of Piraeus'), is a song written by Manos Hatzidakis and first sung by Melina Mercouri in the film of the same name, directed by Jules Dassin and starring Mercouri. The song won the Academy Award for Best Original Song in 1960, a first for a foreign-language picture. The film score was first released on 1 October 1960 by United Artists Records.

== Background ==
"Never on Sunday" was written by Manos Hatzidakis as "Ta Pedia tou Pirea" (The Children of Piraeus). His original Greek lyrics, along with the foreign translations in German, French, Italian and Spanish do not mention "Never on Sunday" (as found in the English lyrics), but rather tell the story of the main female character of the film, Illya (Mercouri). Illya is a jolly woman who sings of her joyful life in her port town of Piraeus ("If I search the world over/I'll find no other port/Which has the magic/Of my Port Piraeus"). Although she earns her money as a prostitute, she longs to meet a man someday who is just as full of joie de vivre as she is herself.

In 1960, the song won the Academy Award for Best Original Song, a first for a foreign-language picture since the Academy began to recognize achievements in this category in 1934.

== Recordings ==
The song has been recorded in a number of languages since its release:

- Greek (as "Τα Παιδιά του Πειραιά") by Melina Mercouri, Nana Mouskouri and Pink Martini. Andy Williams also sung the song in Greek (as "Never On Sunday from the Jules Dassin Picture") on his 1962 album Moon River and Other Great Movie Themes.
- English: An orchestral version recorded by Don Costa reached number 19 on the Billboard Hot 100 in 1960, then returned to the Billboard Top 40 when reissued in 1961. His version also peaked at #13 in Canada and #27 in the UK Singles Chart. Following the success of the orchestral version as well as the Oscar win, an English language version of the song was commissioned to be written especially to match the title of the film. The lyrics to the English version of the song were written by Billy Towne. A vocal of the song by The Chordettes reached number 13 on the Billboard Hot 100 and number 16 on the Canadian charts in 1961, making it their final Top 40 hit in North America. It was also recorded by Billy Eckstine, Bing Crosby, Lena Horne, Doris Day, Trini Lopez, The 4 Seasons, Connie Francis, Julie London, Eartha Kitt, Petula Clark, Lale Andersen, Ann-Margret, and the New Christy Minstrels, plus as an instrumental by Herb Alpert and the Tijuana Brass and James Last. The Ventures released a version on their 1963 Dolton album The Ventures Play Telstar and the Lonely Bull, as did The Baskerville Hounds on their 1967 Dot Records album The Baskerville Hounds – Featuring Space Rock, Part 2.
- In the United Kingdom, there were five versions in the UK Singles Chart. They were Don Costa, reached number 27; Chaquito (actually Johnny Gregory), reached number 50; Lynn Cornell with the only vocal version in the UK chart, reached number 30; Makadopulos and his Greek Serenaders, reached number 36; and Manuel and his Music of The Mountains (actually Geoff Love), which peaked at number 29.
- Italian (as "Uno a te, uno a me") by Dalida, Milva, Nilla Pizzi, and Isabella Fedeli.
- French (as "Les Enfants du Pirée") by Dalida, Melina Mercouri and Darío Moreno. Dalida's French version of this song topped the French singles chart in 1960.
- Spanish (as "Los niños del Pireo") by Dalida; there is also "Nunca en Domingo" by Xiomara Alfaro.
- German: Lale Andersen scored a number one hit in 1960 with a German-language version, "Ein Schiff wird kommen". It was also covered by Dalida, Caterina Valente, Lys Assia, Nana Mouskouri, Helmuth Brandenburg and Melina Mercouri. In 1982 the Neue Deutsche Welle band Der Moderne Man recorded a gay themed new wave version named "Blaue Matrosen" with the same German lyrics of Lale Andersen's version, but sung by a man.
- Dutch (as "Nooit op zondag") by Mieke Telkamp, based on the melody.
- Yiddish (as "Nisht oyf zintuk") by The Barry Sisters.
- Polish (as "Dzieci Pireusu") by Maria Koterbska and duo of actors Hanna Śleszyńska & Jacek Wójcicki.
- Czech (as "Děti z Pirea", 1962) by Milan Chladil & Yvetta Simonová.
- Serbian (as "Деца Пиреја") by Lola Novaković and Ljiljana Petrović.
- Croatian (as "Nikad nedjeljom") by Ksenia Prohaska.
- Slovenian (as "Otroci Pireja") by Helena Blagne.
- Cantonese (as "兩仔爺") by Cheng Gwan-min (鄭君綿), Tang Kee-chan (鄧寄塵) and Cheng Pik Ying (鄭碧影) in 1962. Another cover version was sung by Andy Lau (劉德華), Anita Mui (梅艷芳), Sandra Ng (吳君如), Ronald Cheng (鄭中基), Gordon Lam (林家棟), Suzanne Chung (鍾依澄), Cherrie Ying (應采兒), and Lam Chi-chung (林子聰) in the 2001 film Dance of a Dream (愛君如夢). The song title roughly translates to "Father and Son".
- Mandarin (as "別在星期天") by Teresa Teng (鄧麗君). The title translates as "Never on Sunday". It was additionally covered by Rebecca Pan (潘迪華) in 1961 and Ouyang Fei Fei (歐陽菲菲) in 1968.
- Portuguese (as "As crianças do Pireu") by Paula Ribas.
- Hindi (as "जाने न जाने") by Usha Uthup on the album "Dekha Dekhi"
- Finnish (as "Ei koskaan sunnuntaisin") by Four Cats, Vieno Kekkonen and Kaarina Heikkinen among others.
- Sinhala (as "රෑට කමු අපි වම්බටු", translates to "Let's eat eggplants for dinner") by Chandu de Silva (a.k.a. Jolly Seeya).
- Hebrew (as "ומה נשאר לי", translates to "And What Do I Have Left?") by Givatron.
- Swedish (as "Aldrig på en söndag") by Ann-Louise Hanson and Siw Malmkvist.
- Danish (as "Aldrig Om Søndagen") by Grethe Ingmann.
- Catalan (as "Els minyons del Pireu") by José Guardiola (1960); there is also "Els nens del Pireu" by Ara va de bo.

=== Other appearances ===
- In 1962, Chubby Checker released an uptempo version of the song with slightly altered English lyrics ("You can twist it" rather than "You can kiss me" and "You can shake it on a Friday..." instead of "A Thursday, a Friday..."). Checker's recording also included a single verse in Greek.
- The song was featured in the 2005 film Munich.
- James Hill, a Canadian ukulele player, recorded a version of the song on ukulele for his album A Flying Leap.
- Nia Vardalos sang a snippet of the Greek version in the 2009 film My Life in Ruins.
- Los Umbrellos, a Danish musical group, used it as a base for their 1998 signature song "No Tengo Dinero".
- The song was sung in an episode of The Muppet Show by Miss Piggy and Greek pig characters, complete with smashing plates.
- Egyptian guitarist Omar Khorshid recorded an instrumental version of the song.
- Hartford Stage artistic director Darko Tresnjak chose the song to open his production of The Comedy of Errors by William Shakespeare.
- It appears in the film Beautiful Girls; however it is not on the soundtrack album. This version was performed by Bernie Wyte and his Orchestra.
- The song also can be heard in the 1999 Kevin Smith film Dogma during one scene (specifically, the version by The Chordettes).
- The version by The Chordettes is also heard during the barbecue scene in The Wonder Years episode "How I'm Spending My Summer Vacation".
- Denise Keene covered the song in 1965.
- Trish Thùy Trang, Shayla, Thanh Trúc, and Jacqueline Thụy Trâm covered it in English:youtube
