= Are You Lonesome Tonight? =

1926 song by Lou Handman and Roy Turk

Single by Charles Hart
- B-side: "Sweet Marie"
- Released: 1927
- Recorded: May 9, 1927
- Genre: Traditional pop
- Length: 3:10
- Label: Harmony Records
- Songwriters: Lou Handman, Roy Turk

"Are You Lonesome Tonight?" (sometimes stylized as Are You Lonesome To-night?) is a song written by Roy Turk and Lou Handman in 1926. It was recorded several times in 1927, first by Charles Hart, but also with successful versions by Vaughn De Leath, Henry Burr, and the duet of Jerry Macy and John Ryan. In 1950, the Blue Barron Orchestra version reached the top twenty on Billboard's Pop Singles chart.

In April 1960, after Elvis Presley's two-year service in the United States Army, he recorded the song at the suggestion of his manager Colonel Tom Parker; "Are You Lonesome Tonight?" was Parker's wife, Marie Mott's, favorite song. Its release was delayed by RCA Victor executives, who thought the song did not fit Presley's new (and publicized) style. When "Are You Lonesome Tonight?" was released in November 1960, it was an immediate success in the U.S., topping Billboard's Pop Singles chart and reaching number three on the R&B chart. A month after the song's release, it topped the UK Singles Chart. Presley's version was certified by the Recording Industry Association of America for a Gold Record Award for 1,000,000 copies sold in the United States in 1983. It was upgraded by the RIAA to a 2× Platinum Record Award for 2,000,000 sales in 1992. "Are You Lonesome Tonight?" was later recorded by several other artists, with versions by Donny Osmond and Merle Haggard becoming top-twenty hits on the pop and country charts, respectively. Billboard ranked "Are You Lonesome Tonight?" number 81 on its "Hot 100 All-Time Top Songs" list in 2008.

== Composition and early versions ==
The song was written in 1926 by vaudevillians Lou Handman and Roy Turk, with music likely derived from Fermo Dante Marchetti's "Fascination". It has three verses, followed by a spoken bridge. They based the bridge on a line in Ruggero Leoncavallo's Pagliacci, and "You know someone said that the world's a stage. And each must play a part" refers to "All the world's a stage" from William Shakespeare's As You Like It. This recitation is printed on the inside back cover of the original 1927 sheet music and is sung on Stanley Kirkby's recording in 1928, Al Jolson's recording in 1949 and Blue Barron's recording in 1950 (US top 20 hit). Billboard reported in 1960 that it was written by songwriter and vaudeville pianist Dave Dreyer.

"Are You Lonesome Tonight?" by Charles Hart
Several versions of the song were recorded in 1927, the first by Charles Hart.

Several versions of "Are You Lonesome Tonight?" were recorded in 1927. The first, by Charles Hart, was recorded on May 9 and released on Harmony Records (431-H) as the B-side of "Sweet Marie". On June 13, Vaughn De Leath recorded the song as the B-side of "It's a Million to One You're in Love" for Edison Records (Ed-52044). De Leath had the first hit version of the song, which peaked at number four in November. On July 10, 1927, the Newport Society Orchestra recorded the song with Irving Kaufman as the vocalist; it was released on Harmony Records (511-H) with "I'm Walkin' On Air". A version by the duet of Jerry Macy and John Ryan was released on Okeh Records (Ok-40866) as the B-side of "Carolina Mine". Henry Burr's version peaked at number ten, and Little Jack Little had a hit with the song for Columbia Records. Although Gene Austin included the song in his shows during the 1930s, he never recorded it.

In March 1950, the Blue Barron Orchestra released "Are You Lonesome Tonight?" with "Penny Wise and Love Foolish" on the B-side, and it peaked at number nineteen on Billboard's Top Pop Singles chart. In April, Don Cornell released a version without the narrative bridge as the B-side of his RCA Victor single, "Stay With the Happy People". Billboard called it a: "dreamy waltz ... (that) gets effective treatment (on the recording)." Based on votes sent to Billboard, the song received 78 points from disc jockeys, 78 from record dealers, 79 from jukebox operators, and 78 points overall; on the magazine's 100-point scale, it was rated "Good." Al Jolson recorded a version with the spoken bridge on April 28, 1950, in Los Angeles; Gordon Jenkins conducted the orchestra. With "No Sad Songs For Me" on the B-side, it was released by Decca Records in June. According to Billboard, although the version was "revived" by Jolson's "schmaltz style" his recitation of the bridge was "hamboned". Based on votes sent to the magazine, the song received 71 points from disc jockeys, 71 from record dealers, and 71 from jukebox operators; with an overall score of 71, it was rated "Good." In 1958, Jim Flaherty's Western Caravan recorded the song on the Frankie Records label, with B-side "My Foolish Heart" sung by Maury Dubois. This version, with vocals by Howie Stange, gained quite a following in New England, mainly due to Jim Flaherty's tireless promotion. At the November 1959 DJ Convention held in Nashville, Jim Flaherty handed Chet Atkins a copy of the song with the encouragement of getting "that kid down south (Elvis Presley) who is shaking things up" to record it. In 1959, Jaye P. Morgan released the song on MGM Records, with "Miss You" on the B-side, and her version peaked at number 65 on Billboard's Pop Singles chart.

== Elvis Presley version ==
"Are You Lonesome Tonight?"
- US single sleeve

Single by Elvis Presley
- B-side: "I Gotta Know"
- Released: November 1, 1960
- Recorded: April 4, 1960
- Studio: RCA Studio B, Nashville
- Genre: Pop, country
- Length: 3:07
- Label: RCA Victor
- Songwriters: Lou Handman, Roy Turk
- Producers: Steve Sholes, Chet Atkins

Elvis Presley singles chronology
"It's Now or Never" (1960)	"Are You Lonesome Tonight?" (1960)	"Surrender" (1961)

Elvis Presley UK singles chronology
"It's Now or Never" (1960)	"Are You Lonesome Tonight?" (1960)	"Wooden Heart" (1961)

Music video
- "Are You Lonesome Tonight?" (audio) on YouTube

Audio sample
- file; help

In the final months of his service in the US Army, Elvis Presley began experimenting with new material in anticipation of his return to recording. His first recording session was scheduled for March 20, 1960, and RCA's Studio B had recently been equipped with a new three-track recorder. To improve the recording of Presley's voice, engineer Bill Porter had Telefunken U-47 microphones installed. A follow-up session was scheduled for April.

During the selection of material for the sessions, Presley's manager, Colonel Tom Parker, suggested "Are You Lonesome Tonight?" The favorite song of Parker's wife, Marie Mott (who knew the song from Gene Austin's act, since he was also managed at the time by her husband), it was the only time he intervened in Presley's choice of repertoire. Presley returned to the studio with his band, consisting of Scotty Moore and Hank Garland on guitar, D. J. Fontana on drums, Floyd Cramer on piano, Bob Moore on bass, Buddy Harman on percussion, and the Jordanaires on background vocals, recorded on April 3.

After the eight songs Parker needed for Elvis Is Back! were recorded, Presley moved on to his manager Parker's request. At 4 a.m. on April 4, the singer began recording "Are You Lonesome Tonight?", accompanied by acoustic guitar, drums, bass, and the backing vocalists. He asked everyone else in the studio to leave the session, told Chet Atkins to turn the lights out, and performed the song with the spoken bridge. After the second take, Presley said to producer Steve Sholes, "Throw that tune out; I can't do it justice." Sholes told engineer Bill Porter to ignore Presley's order and asked the singer to do a new take, explaining that the Jordanaires had bumped into their microphone stand while recording in the dark. As a result, Presley performed the song once more, and that take became the master for the single.

=== Release and reception ===
"Are You Lonesome Tonight?" was not released for several months while RCA executives decided if the ballad reflected Presley's new style, but they and Parker ultimately decided to release it. The song was released as a single on November 1, 1960, with "I Gotta Know" on the B-side, and pressing was assigned to plants in New Jersey, Indianapolis, and Los Angeles. Copies (with a sleeve featuring a smiling Presley in a chartreuse shirt against a blue background) were sent to 5,000 disc jockeys. Orders for the single began at 900,000 copies the first week and climbed to 1,200,000 during the second.

The song debuted on Billboard's Top 40 at number 35 on November 14, moved a week later to number two, and topped the Billboard Hot 100 chart by November 28 (replacing Maurice Williams and the Zodiacs' "Stay"). Presley's 15th chart-topping single, it held the top position until January 9, 1961. "Are You Lonesome Tonight?" peaked at number three on the R&B chart, remaining on it for ten weeks. The song topped the Cash Box singles chart and reached number 45 on the Cash Box country singles chart. A month after its UK release, it topped the UK Singles Chart. Three months after its release, the single had sales of two million copies worldwide; that year, the Recording Industry Association of America certified it gold.

A November 7, 1960, Billboard review called Presley's rendition a "warm and touching performance". In a 2013 review, AllMusic praised Presley's vocal range, calling "Are You Lonesome Tonight?" a "tender ... sugary ballad ... full of soul and intense and intimate power" defining "one of Presley's darkest moments."

=== Legacy ===
The success of "Are You Lonesome Tonight?" made the song one of Presley's live staples. He performed it live for the first time on March 25, 1961, at a Bloch Arena benefit in Honolulu for the USS Arizona Memorial, one of Presley's four live performances between his return from the Army and his shift in career focus to acting.

Returning to music in 1968, Presley included the song on his playlist for the NBC special Elvis and performed it live the following year during his first Las Vegas engagement. A version of the song, recorded on August 26, 1969, and documenting Presley altering the words of the narration after seeing a man in the audience slip and lose his toupée ("Do you gaze at your bald head and wish you had hair") and laughing through the rest of the bridge, was released in 1980 as part of the Elvis Aron Presley box set. The soprano backing is by Cissy Houston. In 1982, this "laughing version" was a radio hit in the United Kingdom and reached number 25 on the British Singles Chart.

A very emotional version of "Are You Lonesome Tonight?" was performed and filmed in 1972 at Hampton Roads. This show was filmed for the documentary Elvis On Tour; however, the song was not included in that film but was released with other outtakes in 1992 on the home video release Elvis – The Lost Performances.

A version filmed at Presley's last tour was included in the 1977 CBS special Elvis in Concert, broadcast after Presley's death.

On March 27, 1992, the RIAA certified "Are You Lonesome Tonight?" double platinum. In 2008 (the 50th anniversary of Billboard's Hot 100), the song was number 81 on the magazine's "Hot 100 All-Time Top Songs" list.

In September 2024, Herb Alpert included an instrumental version on his 50th released album, 50.

=== Charts ===
==== Weekly charts ====
Chart (1960–61)	Peak position
Australia	1
Belgium (Ultratop 50 Flanders)	1
Belgium (Ultratop 50 Wallonia)	1
Canada (CHUM Hit Parade)	1
Chile	1
Netherlands (Single Top 100)	1
Norway (VG-lista)	1
New Zealand (Lever Hit Parade)	1
South Africa	1
Spain	1
Sweden (Sverigetopplistan)	3
UK Singles (Official Charts)	1
US Billboard Hot 100	1
US Hot R&B/Hip-Hop Songs (Billboard)	3
US Hot Country Songs (Billboard)	22
US Cash Box Top 100	1
West Germany (GfK)	1

Laughing version

Chart (1981–82)	Peak position
Belgium (Ultratop 50 Flanders)	20
Ireland (IRMA)	16
Netherlands (Single Top 100)	14
UK Singles (Official Charts)	25

==== Year-end charts ====
Chart (1961)	Rank
US Billboard Hot 100	96
US Cash Box Top 100	6

==== All-time charts ====
Chart (1958-2018)	Position
US Billboard Hot 100	101

=== Certifications ===
Region	Certification	Certified units/sales
Netherlands	—	45,000
United Kingdom (BPI)	Silver	200,000^{‡}
United States (RIAA)	2× Platinum	2,000,000^{^}
Summaries
Worldwide	—	9,000,000
^{^} Shipments figures based on certification alone.^{‡} Sales+streaming figures based on certification alone.

== Later versions ==
- Frank Sinatra recorded "Are You Lonesome Tonight?" without the spoken bridge for his 1962 album, All Alone,
- The Lettermen included the song on their 1964 album She Cried.
- Pat Boone recorded a version (also without the spoken bridge) in 1966 for his album, Memories.
- Doris Day recorded the song on June 6, 1967, for The Love Album.
- Donny Osmond's 1973 version is a B-side to his recording of fellow pop standard "When I Fall in Love" from his album A Time for Us.
- Merle Haggard's cover on his 1977 album My Farewell to Elvis peaked at number 12 on Billboard's Top Country Singles.
- John Schneider released a version in 1983 on his album If You Believe which peaked at number 53 on the Country Singles chart.
- Bryan Ferry's version of "Are You Lonesome Tonight?" was part of the soundtrack for the 1992 film Honeymoon in Vegas.

== In popular culture ==
- In the Zucker, Abrahams and Zucker comedy film Top Secret!, musician Nick Rivers (Val Kilmer) performs a version of the song with a guitar. Though it begins with a conventional sound, it quickly turns into a parody that acts as an advertising jingle for the retailer chain Macy's ("...is your heart filled with pain / will you come back again / shop at Macy's and love me tonight.").
- Comedian Sam Kinison performed the song several times in various talk show appearances, including a memorable 1989 performance on The Tonight Show Starring Johnny Carson. Kinison begins by singing a straight, serious cover of the song before descending into angry ranting during the spoken bridge, punctuated by his trademark scream, before suddenly returning to a serious cover again at the song's conclusion.
- The Presley version was used in the 1991 film A Brighter Summer Day by Edward Yang, which was rated the twelfth-best Chinese-language film of all time by the 24th Hong Kong Film Awards in 2005. The title of the film comes from a (misheard) lyric in the Presley recording.

== Chart performance ==
Year	Artist	Chart	Peak position
1927	Vaughn De Leath	Top selling records	4
1927	Henry Burr	Top selling records	10
1950	Blue Barron Orchestra	Billboard Pop Singles	19
1959	Jaye P. Morgan	Billboard Pop Singles	65
1960	Elvis Presley	Billboard Pop Singles	1
1960	Elvis Presley	Billboard R&B singles	3
1960	Elvis Presley	Cash Box Singles	1
1960	Elvis Presley	Cash Box Country Singles	45
1960	Elvis Presley	UK Singles Chart	1
1974	Donny Osmond	Billboard Pop Singles	14
1977	Merle Haggard	Billboard Hot Country Singles	12
1982	Elvis Presley	UK Singles Chart	25
1983	John Schneider	Billboard Hot Country Singles	53
2005	Elvis Presley	UK Singles Chart	2
