= Les Enfants du Pirée (album) =

Studio album by Dalida
- Released: June 1960
- Recorded: 1959–1960
- Genres: Pop; easy listening; schlager; exotica; rock and roll; Greek folk music
- Label: Barclay

Dalida chronology
Love in Portofino (1959)	Les Enfants du Pirée (1960)	Dalida internationale (1961)

Singles from Les enfants du Pirée
- 1. "T'aimer follement" Released: February 1960; 2. "Les Enfants du Pirée" Released: June 1960

Les Enfants du Pirée is the seventh French language studio album by Dalida, and her first album of the 1960s. It contains big #1 hit "Les Enfants du Pirée", and other hits like "T'aimer follement", "Romantica" and "L'Arlequin de Tolède".

In 2002, Barclay Records, then as part of Universal Music France, released a digitally remastered version of the original vinyl in CD and in 10" (25 cm) vinyl record (LP), under the same name, as part of a compilation containing re-releases of all of Dalida's studio albums recorded under the Barclay label. The album was again re-released in 2005.

== Track listing ==
Barclay – 80125 Ⓜ:

Side one
No.	Title	Writer(s)	Length
1.	"Les Enfants du Pirée"	Jacques Larue & Manos Hadjidakis	2:30
2.	"T'aimer follement" (Makin' Love)	André Salvet, Floyd Robinson & Jacques Plait	2:05
3.	"Dans les rues de Bahia" (Too Much Tequila)	André Salvet, Annie Rouvre & Dave Burgess	2:41
4.	"De Grenade à Seville"	Georges Liferman, Hubert Giraud & Pierre Cour	2:16
5.	"Le petit clair de lune" (Tintarella di luna)	Bruno De Filippi, Franco Migliacci & Jacques Larue	2:36

Side two
No.	Title	Writer(s)	Length
1.	"Romantica"	Dino Verde, Fernand Bonifay, Renato Rascel & Roger Berthier	3:24
2.	"Vieni vieni sì..."	Carlo Alberto Rossi & Jean Constantin	2:10
3.	"Le Bonheur" (Hassapico Nostalgique)	Jacques Larue & Manos Hadjidakis	2:35
4.	"S'endormir comme d'habitude"	Guy Magenta & Jacques Larue	2:40
5.	"L'Arlequin de Tolède"	Hubert Giraud & Jean Dréjac	3:00
Total length:			26:01
