= List of number-one singles of 1960 (France) =

This is a list of the French singles & airplay chart reviews number-ones of 1960.

== Number-ones by week ==
=== Singles chart ===
Week	Issue date	Artist(s)	Song	Ref.
1	4 January	Les Compagnons de la chanson	"Le marchand de bonheur"	
2	11 January	Les Compagnons de la chanson	"Le marchand de bonheur"	
3	18 January	Les Compagnons de la chanson	"Le marchand de bonheur"	
4	25 January	Les Compagnons de la chanson	"Le marchand de bonheur"	
5	1 February	Les Compagnons de la chanson	"Le marchand de bonheur"	
6	8 February	Les Compagnons de la chanson	"Le marchand de bonheur"	
7	15 February	Johnny Hallyday	"T'aimer follement"	
8	22 February	Johnny Hallyday	"T'aimer follement"	
9	1 March	Johnny Hallyday	"T'aimer follement"	
10	8 March	Johnny Hallyday	"T'aimer follement"	
11	14 March	Bob Azzam	"Mustapha"	
12	21 March	Dalida	"T'aimer follement"	
13	28 March	Bob Azzam	"Mustapha"	
14	4 April	Bob Azzam	"Mustapha"	
15	11 April	Dalida	"T'aimer follement"	
16	18 April	Bob Azzam	"Mustapha"	
17	25 April	Bob Azzam	"Mustapha"	
18	2 May	Bob Azzam	"Mustapha"	
19	9 May	Bob Azzam	"Mustapha"	
20	16 May	Bob Azzam	"Mustapha"	
21	23 May	Bob Azzam	"Mustapha"	
22	30 May	Bob Azzam	"Mustapha"	
23	6 June	Bob Azzam	"Mustapha"	
24	13 June	Bob Azzam	"Mustapha"	
25	20 June	Bob Azzam	"Mustapha"	
26	27 June	Bob Azzam	"Mustapha"	
27	4 July	Bob Azzam	"Mustapha"	
28	11 July	Dalida	"Romantica"	
29	18 July	Dalida	"Les enfants du Pirée"	
30	25 July	Dalida	"Les enfants du Pirée"	
31	1 August	Dalida	"Les enfants du Pirée"	
32	8 August	Dalida	"Les enfants du Pirée"	
33	15 August	Dalida	"Les enfants du Pirée"	
34	22 August	Dalida	"Les enfants du Pirée"	
35	29 August	Dalida	"Les enfants du Pirée"	
36	5 September	Dalida	"Les enfants du Pirée"	
37	12 September	Dalida	"Les enfants du Pirée"	
38	19 September	Dalida	"Romantica"	
39	26 September	Dalida	"Romantica"	
40	3 October	Dalida	"Romantica"	
41	10 October	Dalida	"Romantica"	
42	17 October	Charles Aznavour	"Tu t'laisses aller"	
43	24 October	Charles Aznavour	"Tu t'laisses aller"	
44	31 October	Charles Aznavour	"Tu t'laisses aller"	
45	7 November	Dalida	"Itsy Bitsy Petit Bikini"	
46	14 November	Dalida	"Itsy Bitsy Petit Bikini"	
47	21 November	Dalida	"Itsy Bitsy Petit Bikini"	
48	28 November	Dalida	"Itsy Bitsy Petit Bikini"	
49	5 December	Dalida	"Itsy Bitsy Petit Bikini"	
50	12 December	Dalida	"Itsy Bitsy Petit Bikini"	
51	19 December	Dalida	"Itsy Bitsy Petit Bikini"	
52	26 December	Dalida	"Itsy Bitsy Petit Bikini"	

== See also ==
- 1960 in music
- List of number-one hits (France)
