= Love in Portofino =

- Cover of EP

Song by Dalida
- Released: July 1959
- Recorded: July 1959
- Genre: Chanson; easy listening
- Length: 3:04
- Label: Barclay
- Composer(s): Fred Buscaglione
- Lyricist(s): Leo Chiosso; Jacques Larue

"Love in Portofino" is a 1958 song by Italian writing duo Leo Chiosso and Fred Buscaglione, first sung by Buscaglione. It was picked up by the Italian-French singer Dalida the next year, who recorded it with additional French-language lyrics written by Jacques Larue. Her version achieved sales success in the European market, spawning dozens of covers. Embraced by musical intellectuals as a masterpiece of Dalida's early repertoire of the 1950s, it eventually became the symbolic song for the Italian coastal town Portofino, where it is set.

== Background ==
Leo Chiosso, an Italian lyricist, wrote down the song in 1958. It was mostly in Italian, with only the repeating verse "I found my love in Portofino" in English. The first one to record the song was its composer, Fred Buscaglione.

French lyricist Jacques Larue soon discovered the song and adapted it wholly in French, titled "À San Cristina", which was immediately recorded by a few French singers, with no success.

It was then when Eddie Barclay noticed the song and got it for Dalida. In collaboration with Larue, the French part was rewritten and reduced to minimum, just as an addition to original Italian and English lyrics that were kept. "Love in Portofino" thus became a trilingual song, and under this version it became famous. It was recorded during Dalida's 1959 summer tour pause, under orchestra conduction of Raymond Lefèvre, and was published first on the EP (Barclay – 70 271). It was also featured as a title song of her end of year album.

== Charts ==
| Chart (1959) | Peak position |
|---|---|
| France | 15 |
| Wallonia | 20 |

== Sales ==
Sales for Love in Portofino
| Region | Sales |
|---|---|
| Italy | 100,000 |

== Other recordings ==
Johnny Dorelli in 1959, Andrea Bocelli in 2013, and many more. Italian rapper Geolier sampled Dalida in the song Finchè non si muore, released on his third studio album Dio Lo Sa in June 2024.

== See also ==
- Dalida discography
