= Itsy Bitsy Teenie Weenie Yellow Polkadot Bikini =

1960 song written and composed by Paul Vance and Lee Pockriss

Single by Brian Hyland

from the album The Bashful Blond
- B-side: "Don't Dilly Dally, Sally"
- Released: June 1960
- Genre: Novelty; pop
- Length: 2:19
- Label: Leader/Kapp
- Songwriters: Paul Vance; Lee Pockriss

Brian Hyland singles chronology
"Rosemary" (1959)	"Itsy Bitsy Teenie Weenie Yellow Polkadot Bikini" (1960)	"Four Little Heels (The Clickety Clack Song)" (1960)

"Itsy Bitsy Teenie Weenie Yellow Polkadot Bikini" is a novelty song telling the story of a shy girl wearing a revealing polka dot bikini at the beach. It was written by Paul Vance and Lee Pockriss and first released in June 1960 by Brian Hyland, with an orchestra conducted by John Dixon. The Hyland version reached number one on the Billboard Hot 100, selling a million copies in the US, and was a worldwide hit.

The song has been adapted into French as "Itsy bitsy petit bikini" and into German as "Itsy Bitsy Teenie Weenie Honolulu-Strand-Bikini", reaching number one on national charts in both languages. Several versions of the song have proved successful in various European countries. In 1990, a version by British pop band Bombalurina, titled "Itsy Bitsy Teeny Weeny Yellow Polka Dot Bikini", reached number one on the UK Singles Chart and in Ireland.

== History and lyrics ==
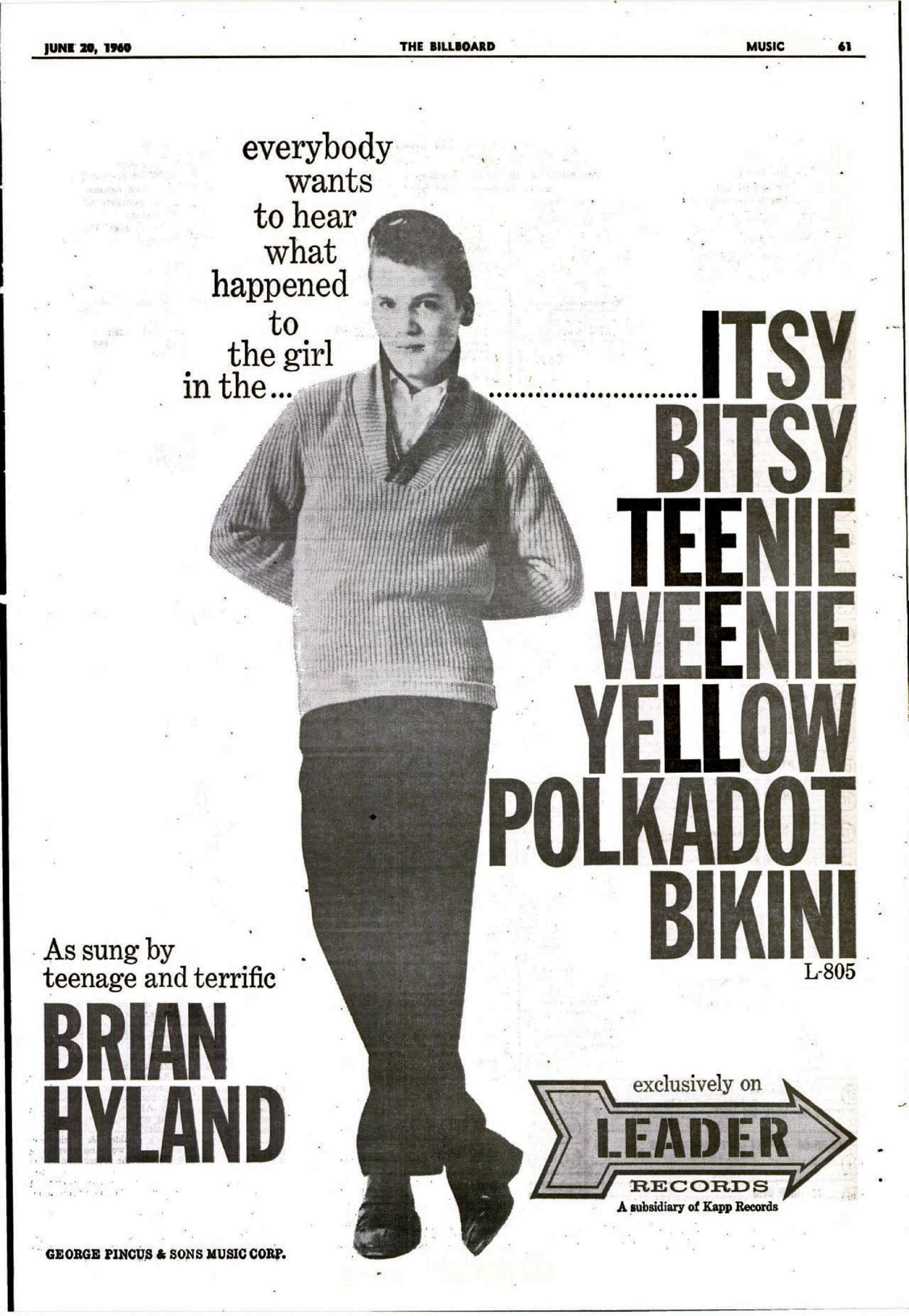
Billboard advertisement, June 20, 1960

The story told through the three verses of the song is as follows: (1) the young lady is too afraid to leave the locker where she has changed into her bikini; (2) she has made it to the beach but sits on the sand wrapped in a blanket; (3) she has finally gone into the sea, but is too afraid to come out, and stays immersed in the water – even though she's "turning blue" – to hide herself from view.

Trudy Packer recited the phrases "...two, three, four / Tell the people what she wore", heard at the end of each verse before the chorus; and "Stick around, we'll tell you more", heard after the first chorus and before the start of the second verse.

In an interview and article by Greg Ehrbar in The Cartoon Music Book, edited by Daniel Goldmark and Yuval Taylor, Rankin-Bass musical director Maury Laws said he 'ghosted' the arrangement of the song for John Dixon, as Dixon had taken on more work than he could handle at that time.

At a time when bikini bathing suits were still seen as too risqué to be mainstream, the song prompted a sudden takeoff in bikini sales. It is credited as being one of the earliest contributors to the acceptance of the bikini in society. The early 1960s saw a slew of surf movies and other film and television productions that rapidly built on the song's momentum.

Hyland's version hit number one on the Billboard Hot 100 on August 8, 1960, and sold over a million copies in the US. It also made the top 10 in other countries, including #8 on the UK Singles Chart. It also reached #1 in New Zealand.

== Ownership controversy ==
In September 2006, Paul Vance, the song's co-writer, saw his own mistaken obituary on TV, as a consequence of the death of another man, Paul Van Valkenburgh, who claimed to have written "Itsy Bitsy Teenie Weenie Yellow Polkadot Bikini" under the name Paul Vance. The impostor had explained his lack of royalty payments for the song by claiming that he had sold the rights as a teenager. Vance, the song's true co-author, earned several million dollars from the song from 1960 until his own death in 2022, describing it as "a money machine."

== In other media ==
The song was featured in the 1961 Billy Wilder film comedy One, Two, Three – in a key scene, the character Otto (Horst Buchholz), suspected of being a spy, is being tortured by the East German police playing the song to him repetitively, eventually with the record off-center to create a weird howling variation of pitch.

The song is also used in the films 36 Chowringhee Lane, Sister Act 2 and Revenge of the Nerds II: Nerds in Paradise.

The song is featured briefly in the opening scene of the 1997 film Contact, in an illustration of the propagation of radio waves through space over time.

In early 2005, the song was used in a TV ad for Yoplait Light in the United States.

The Bombalurina version of the song features in the 2024 Doctor Who episode "Dot and Bubble".

== Charts ==
=== Weekly charts ===
Chart (1960)	Peak position
Belgium (Ultratop 50 Flanders)	4
Belgium (Ultratop 50 Wallonia)	1
Canada (CHUM Chart)	1
Netherlands	3
Italy (Musica e Dischi)	10
West Germany (Der Musikmarkt)	1
New Zealand (Lever Hit Parade)	1
Norway (VG-lista)	3
South Africa (Springbok)	1
UK Singles (Official Charts)	8
US Billboard Hot 100	1
US Cash Box Top 100	1

=== Year-end charts ===
Chart (1960)	Rank
South Africa	11
US Billboard	20
US Cash Box	5

== Italian versions ==
The song was adapted into Italian under the title "Pezzettini di Bikini" by Giancarlo Testoni and recorded by Dalida in 1960. Then, it was recorded by Marino Marini.

== French versions ==
"Itsi bitsi petit bikini"

Single by Dalida

from the album Garde moi la dernière danse
- B-side: "O sole mio"
- Released: September 1960
- Genre: Pop
- Length: 2:21
- Label: Barclay
- Songwriters: André Salvet, Lucien Morisse (French adaptation)
- Producer: Barclay

Dalida singles chronology
"Les enfants du Pirée" (1960)	"Itsi bitsi petit bikini" (1960)	"24.000 baci" (1961)

"Itsy bitsy petit bikini"

Single by Johnny Hallyday

from the album Hello Johnny
- B-side: "Depuis qu'ma môme"
- Released: October 11, 1960
- Genre: Rock and roll
- Length: 2:15
- Label: Philips
- Songwriters: André Salvet, Lucien Morisse (French adaptation)

Johnny Hallyday singles chronology
"Souvenirs, souvenirs" (1960)	"Itsy bitsy petit bikini" (1960)	"Le p'tit clown de ton cœur" (1960)

The song was adapted into French under the title "Itsy bitsy petit bikini" by André Salvet and Lucien Morisse. The French version was recorded in 1960 first by Dalida and then by Johnny Hallyday and Richard Anthony. Sales of all three French versions, as well as Brian Hyland's English version, were combined and reached number one in Wallonia (French-speaking Belgium), charting for nine months from September 1, 1960, to May 1, 1961.

A version by the animated character Funny Bear also reached number 13 in the top 30 in France in 2007, which made it Funny Bear's third most successful French single.

Richard Anthony's version of "Itsy bitsy petit bikini" appears in the 2006 film A Good Year.

=== Track listings ===
Dalida version 7-inch single Barclay 70345 (1960)

1. "Itsi bitsi petit bikini" (2:13)
2. "O sole mio" (2:51)

Johnny Hallyday version 7-inch single Vogue V. 45-775 (1960)

1. "Itsy bitsy petit bikini" (2:15)
2. "Depuis qu'ma môme" (2:25)

=== Charts ===
==== Johnny Hallyday version ====
Chart (1960–1961)	Peak position
Belgium (Ultratop 50 Wallonia)	1

==== Funny Bear version ====
Chart (2007)	Peak position
France (SNEP)	30

== German versions ==
In Germany, the song was renamed "Itsy Bitsy Teenie Weenie Honolulu-Strand-Bikini" and with German lyrics written by Rudolf Günter Loose. It was recorded by Club Honolulu, an alias for French-born Italian singer Caterina Valente and her brother Silvio Francesco, and reached number one on the West German charts.

The teenage Danish brothers Jan & Kjeld also recorded a version in German, but although the duo were popular in West Germany, having already had several hits there, their version failed to chart in that country, and its only chart appearance was in the Netherlands.

=== Charts ===
==== Club Honolulu version ====
Chart (1960)	Peak position
West Germany (GfK)	1

==== Jan & Kjeld version ====
Chart (1960)	Peak position
Netherlands (Single Top 100)	18

== Albert West versions ==
Dutch singer Albert West collaborated with original singer Hyland on an updated version in 1988, which reached number 43 on the Dutch singles chart. In 2003 West recorded another version of the song with Band Zonder Banaan which reached number 36.

=== Charts ===
==== Albert West & Brian Hyland version ====
Chart (1988)	Peak position
Netherlands (Single Top 100)	43

==== Band Zonder Banaan & Albert West version ====
Chart (2003)	Peak position
Netherlands (Single Top 100)	36

== Bombalurina version ==
"Itsy Bitsy Teeny Weeny Yellow Polka Dot Bikini"

Single by Bombalurina

from the album Huggin An'a Kissin'
- B-side: "Clap Yo Hands, Stamp Yo Feet"
- Released: July 16, 1990
- Genre: Pop
- Length: 3:38
- Label: Carpet; Polydor
- Songwriters: Paul Vance; Lee Pockriss
- Producers: Nigel Wright; Andrew Lloyd Webber (exec.); Les McCutcheon (exec.)

Bombalurina singles chronology
"Itsy Bitsy Teeny Weeny Yellow Polka Dot Bikini" (1990)	"Seven Little Girls" (1990)

In July 1990, a version was released by Bombalurina, titled "Itsy Bitsy Teeny Weeny Yellow Polka Dot Bikini", which featured Timmy Mallett, star of Wacaday, a popular UK children's television show of the time, along with two dancers, Dawn Andrews and Annie Dunkley. Andrews later married Gary Barlow of the group Take That. Mallett told the British pop magazine Smash Hits that the composer of popular theatre musicals Andrew Lloyd Webber had come up with the idea for making the single, and had asked Mallett to sing on it. The day after recording the song, Mallett took a copy of it on a tour of European clubs where he was making personal appearances, and asked the clubs' DJs to play the song, raising public awareness of the record. In November 2008, schoolteacher and former singer Everton Barnes claimed that he was the real singer on the record, as Mallett had been unable to hit the right notes and sang flat.

The song was released on Carpet Records, a subsidiary of Andrew Lloyd Webber's Really Useful Group. Lloyd Webber later admitted that he had produced the song because his wife had bet him that as a composer of musical theatre, he would not be able to make a pop song that was a big hit. The band name "Bombalurina" was taken from the name of one of the characters in Lloyd Webber's musical Cats.

The song reached number one on the UK Singles Chart on August 19, 1990, and was certified silver for sales of 200,000 copies. The single also reached number one in Ireland and the top 10 in Austria, Finland, Germany, New Zealand, and Norway.

=== Charts ===
==== Weekly charts ====
Chart (1990)	Peak position
Australia (ARIA Charts)	66
Austria (Ö3 Austria Top 40)	7
Belgium (Ultratop 50 Flanders)	29
Europe (Eurochart Hot 100)	2
Finland (Suomen virallinen lista)	4
France (SNEP)	45
Germany (GfK)	9
Ireland (IRMA)	1
New Zealand (Recorded Music NZ)	3
Norway (VG-lista)	3
Switzerland (Schweizer Hitparade)	28
UK Singles (Official Charts)	1

==== Year-end charts ====
Chart (1990)	Rank
Europe (Eurochart Hot 100)	39
UK Singles (Gallup)	16

=== Certifications ===
Region	Certification	Certified units/sales
United Kingdom (BPI)	Silver	200,000^{^}
^{^} Shipments figures based on certification alone.

=== Release history ===
Region	Date	Format(s)	Label(s)	Ref.
United Kingdom	July 16, 1990	7-inch vinyl; 12-inch vinyl; cassette	Carpet; Polydor	
Australia	November 26, 1990	7-inch vinyl; 12-inch vinyl; cassette	Polydor	

== Other cover versions ==
There have been cover versions in many languages.

- Connie Francis included a version of the song on her 1966 album Connie Francis and The Kids Next Door.
- Jimi Hendrix played a brief cover of the song on the live recording Mr. Pitiful, released in 1981 in Germany only.
- German punk band Die Toten Hosen covered the Club Honolulu version (in German) on their 1987 cover album Never Mind the Hosen, Here's Die Roten Rosen. It was released as a promo single under the alias Die Roten Rosen. Also, on the 2007 re-release, the English version was added as a bonus track.
- Hungarian pop star Szandi covered the song as the title track of her 1989 album Kicsi lány (English translation: Little Girl). The chorus in Hungarian is the following: "Egy csöppnyi, ici-pici, csuda-buli, Honolulu fürdőruci", meaning "A teenie-weenie, itsy-bitsy, super-dooper Honolulu swimming suit".
- A cover version was made by Devo on the CD Pioneers Who Got Scalped. This version of the song had appeared in the film Revenge of the Nerds II: Nerds in Paradise, but was unavailable on CD until the release of the Pioneers album.
- Kermit the Frog and Miss Piggy covered the song for the 1993 album Muppet Beach Party.
- Ray Stevens, in 2012, covered the song on his 9-CD Encyclopedia of Recorded Comedy Music project.
- Mud recorded a cover version in 1982.
- A Brazil version, a little faithful to the original, "Biquíni de Bolinha Amarelinha Tão Pequenininho", (LP Ronnie Cord, Copacabana CLP 11.164, October 1960) was a hit in 1960 when it was sung by Ronnie Cord, and had some re-recordings, by artists like Celly Campello and Blitz's 1983 version.
- A Spanish version "Bikini Amarillo" (very faithful to the original) was a hit for Mexican singer Manolo Muñoz in the 1960s.
- George Wright covered the song in his 1984 album Red Hot and Blue.
- In 1987, it was sung in Greek by Polina (Πωλίνα), with the title "Το ροζ μπικίνι" (English: "The Pink Bikini"), in her album Πάμε για τρέλλες στις Σεϋχέλλες (Pame gia trelles stis Seychelles).
- Argentinian pop groups Viuda e hijas de Roque Enroll and The Sacados recorded successful versions in 1984 and 1990 respectively, under the name "Bikini a lunares amarillo". The lyrics were translated into local slang, and update the source of shame to lack of waxing.
- A Portuguese version "Bikini Pequenino às Bolinhas Amarelas" was sung by group Onda Choc in 1990. It was a hit and would later be re-recorded by Docemania in 2008.
- A Bulgarian version "Бански на лалета" ("Tulip Themed Bathing Suit") sung by the children group Sparrows (Врабчета) contains kids-friendly comic lyrics. In the lyrics, a girl falls in love with a boy impressed by his tulip themed swimming suit among other things.
- With lyrics in Swedish by Karl-Lennart, Lill-Babs recorded the song.
- The singing character Gummibär recorded original English, Spanish and French versions.
- In 1960, it was sung in Japanese by Danny Iida & The Paradise King with Kyu Sakamoto as a member. (Toshiba Records JP-5051)
- In 2021, the German pirate folk metal band, Storm Seeker, covered "Itsy Bitsy Teenie Weenie Honolulu Strand-Bikini" in German on their second studio album.
- A Lithuanian schlager-style version called "Pabučiuoki" ("Kiss") was recorded by singer Vilma Kvedaravičiūtė and Alfonsas Juškys in 2001.

== See also ==
- List of Hot 100 number-one singles of 1960 (U.S.)
- List of Billboard Hot 100 top-ten singles in 1960
- List of Billboard Hot 100 number-one singles from 1958 to 1969
- Billboard Year-End Hot 100 singles of 1960
- List of Cash Box Top 100 number-one singles of 1960
- List of number-one hits of 1960 (Germany)
- List of number-one singles of 1960 (Canada)
- List of number-one singles of 1960 (France)
- List of number-one singles of 1961 (France)
- List of number-one singles from the 1990s (UK)
- List of UK top-ten singles in 1990
- List of UK Singles Chart number ones of the 1990s
- List of UK top-ten singles in 1990
- List of number-one singles of 1990 (Ireland)
