= Blue Barron =

American Big Band leader (1913–2005)

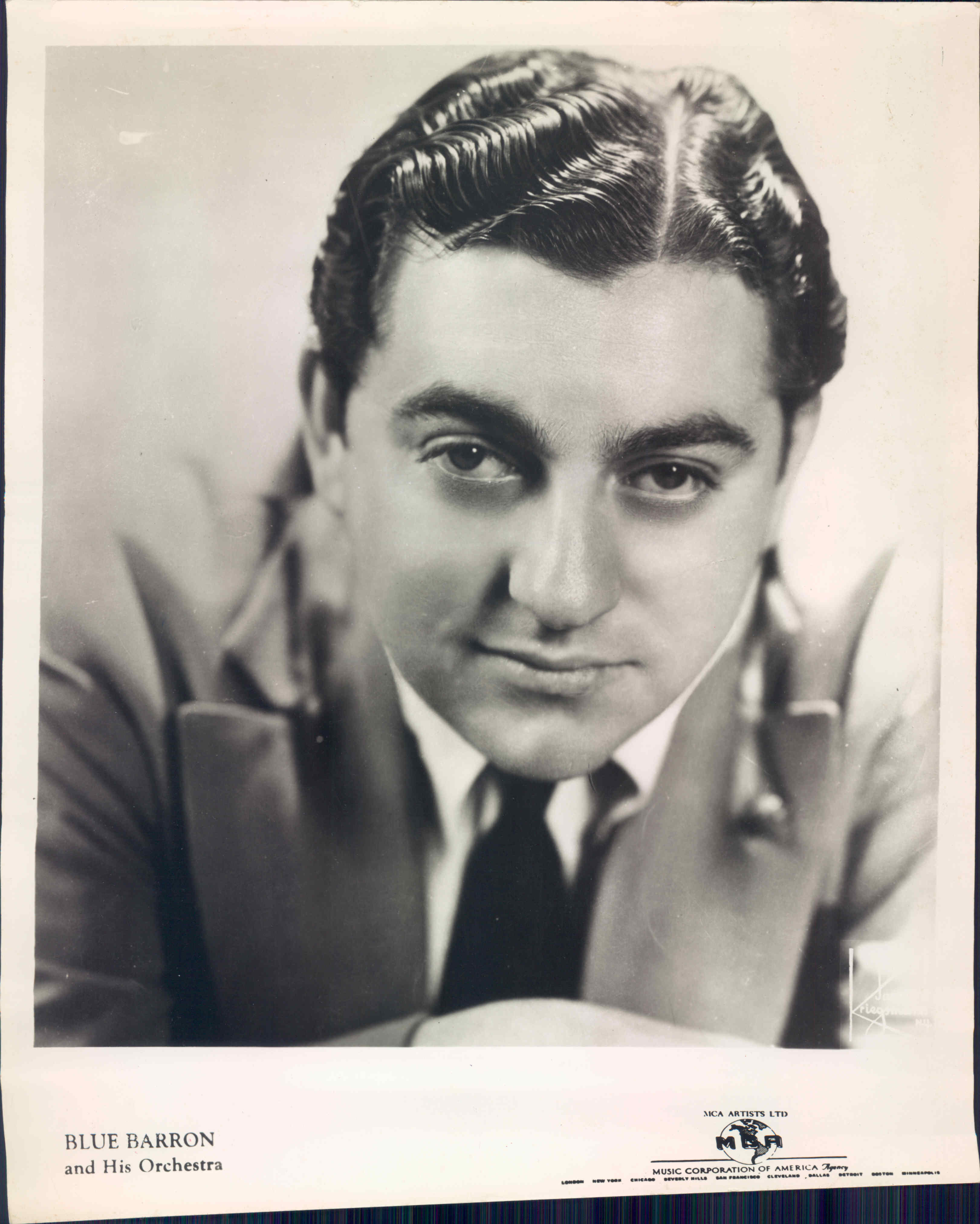
Blue Barron and His Orchestra

Blue Barron (November 19, 1913 – July 16, 2005), born Harry Freidman, was an American orchestra leader in the 1940s and early 1950s during the Big Band era. His band's more subdued tone was referred to as "sweet" music to distinguish it from the "Swing" bands of the era. Barron's orchestra began in the New York City area but later toured the U.S. and performed at popular venues in Los Angeles where they also appeared in several motion pictures and recorded a number of LPs.

== Early years ==
Born in Cleveland, Ohio, United States, Freidman studied at Ohio University before going into show business. He adopted the stage name Blue Barron and by 1940 had created his own orchestra.

== Career ==
His first group played on the Floating Palace showboat at Troy, New York, in October 1936. A newspaper report said the group "made an over night hit at the Floating Palace and remained there for 22 weeks."

== National Service and honors ==
During World War II, Barron served with the United States Army and at war's end resumed his musical career. He was able to work in the industry for another ten years until the Big Band era gave way to new musical forms. For his contribution to the recording industry, he has a star on the Hollywood Walk of Fame at 1724 Vine Street. Barron hit number 1 for two weeks in 1949 with "Cruising Down The River". The record sold over one million copies, gaining gold disc status.

== Death ==
Blue Barron died in 2005, at the age of 91, in Baltimore, Maryland, and is interred in Baltimore.
