= Makin' Love =

1959 single by Floyd Robinson

- 1959 Italian single sleeve

Single by Floyd Robinson

from the album Floyd Robinson
- B-side: "My Girl"
- Released: May 1959
- Recorded: March 17, 1959
- Genre: Country rock
- Length: 1:56
- Label: RCA
- Songwriter: Floyd Robinson
- Producer: Chet Atkins

Floyd Robinson singles chronology
"The Man in the Moon Is a Lady" (1959)	"Makin' Love" (1959)	"Tonight You Belong to Me" (1959)

"Makin' Love" is a song written and originally released by American country singer Floyd Robinson. He released it as a single in 1959 and was featured on his self-titled debut album the following year.

== Commercial performance ==
The song became a hit on the both sides of Atlantic. In the United States it reached no. 20 on the Billboard Hot 100 and no. 27 on the Billboard Black Singles chart. In the UK it reached no. 9 on the national singles chart.

In the U.S., "Makin' Love" was controversial because of its suggestive sexual content, and many radio stations pulled it from the airwaves after only a few weeks.

== Charts ==
Chart (1959)	Peak position
Belgium (Ultratip Bubbling Under Wallonia)	–
Norway (VG-lista)	7
UK Singles (OCC)	9
US Hot R&B/Hip-Hop Songs (Billboard)	27
US Billboard Hot 100	20

== Dalida version (in French) ==
"T'aimer follement"

Single by Dalida

from the album Les enfants du Pirée
- Language: French
- English title: Love you madly
- Released: February 1960
- Genre: Pop
- Length: 2:01
- Label: Barclay
- Songwriters: Jacques Plait, André Salvet, Floyd Robinson

Dalida singles chronology
"Elle, lui et l'autre" (1959)	"T'aimer follement" (1960)	"L'arlequin de Tolède" (1960)

The song was translated into French (under the title "T'aimer follement", meaning "Love you madly") and recorded by two French singers: Dalida for her 1960 album Les enfants du Pirée and soon then-unknown Johnny Hallyday. Both versions were released in early 1960.

Dalida's version reached no. 2 in Wallonia (French Belgium). and no. 1 in France.

=== Charts ===
Chart (1960)	Peak position
Belgium (Ultratop 50 Wallonia)	2
France (singles sales)	1

== Johnny Hallyday version (in French) ==
"T'aimer follement"

Single by Johnny Hallyday

from the album Hello Johnny
- Language: French
- English title: Love you madly
- Released: March 14, 1960
- Genre: Rock and roll
- Length: 2:30
- Label: Disques Vogue
- Songwriters: Jacques Plait, André Salvet, Floyd Robinson

Johnny Hallyday singles chronology
"T'aimer follement" (1960)	"Souvenirs, souvenirs" (1960)

In March 1960, one month after Dalida's version, French singer Johnny Hallyday covered the song as his debut single, based on the former's arrangement and was featured on his debut album Hello Johnny later that year.

=== Track listings ===
7-inch EP Vogue EPL 7750 (1960, France etc.)

A1. "T'aimer follement" (2:30)
A2. "J'étais fou" (2:45)
B1. "Laisse les filles" (2:17)
B2. "Oh, Oh Baby" (2:52)

7-inch single Vogue V. 45-722 (1960, France etc.)

A. "T'aimer follement" (2:27)
B. "Laisse les filles" (2:28)

7-inch single Vogue Productions 45-4068 (Canada)

A. "T'aimer Follement" (2:28)
B. "J'et ais fou" (2:49)

CD single Disques Vogue 743211131712 (1993, France)

1. "T'aimer follement" (2:29)
2. "Nous les gars, nous les filles (1:51)

CD single "Souvenirs, Souvenirs / T'aimer follement" amc 14.002 (2000, Belgium)

1. "Souvenirs, souvenirs" (2:09)
2. "T'aimer follement" (2:29)

== See also ==
- List of number-one singles of 1960 (France)
