= Dalida internationale =

Album by Dalida

Studio album by Dalida
- Released: 1961
- Recorded: 1960–61
- Length: 25:43
- Label: Barclay

Dalida chronology
Elle, lui et l'autre.... (1960)	Dalida internationale (1961)	Rendezvous mit Dalida (1961)

Singles from Garde-moi la dernière danse
- 1. "Itsi bitsi petit bikini" Released: 1960; 2. "Les marrons chauds" Released: January 1961; 3. "Parlez moi d'amour" Released: July 1961; 4. "Dix mille bulles bleues" Released: September 1961

Dalida internationale is the eighth album by Dalida, released in 1961. Several of the singles were hits.

== Track listing ==
Barclay – 80144 Ⓜ, 065 521-0:

Side one
No.	Title	Writer(s)	Length
1.	"Garde-moi la dernière danse" (Save the Last Dance for Me)	Doc Pomus & Mort Shuman	2:45
2.	"Dix mille bulles bleues" (Le Mille Bolle Blu)	Carlo Alberto Rossi & Vito Pallavicini	3:30
3.	"Parlez moi d'amour"	Jean Lenoir	3:44
4.	"Je me sens vivre" (Un Uomo Vivo)	Gino Paoli	2:13
5.	"Itsi bitsi petit bikini"	Lee Pockriss & Paul Vance	2:15

Side two
No.	Title	Writer(s)	Length
1.	"Pépé"	Dory Langdon & Hans Wittstatt	2:05
2.	"La joie d'aimer" (Unforgiven)	Dimitri Tiomkin & Jean Broussolle	2:30
3.	"24 000 baisers" (24 Mila Baci)	Adriano Celentano, Lucio Fulci & Piero Vivarelli	2:06
4.	"'O sole mio"	Eduardo di Capua & Giovanni Capurro	2:50
5.	"Les marrons chauds"	Colette Nicolas & Georges Garvarentz	3:00
Total length:			25:43

== Sources ==
- L'argus Dalida: Discographie mondiale et cotations, by Daniel Lesueur, Éditions Alternatives, 2004. ISBN 2-86227-428-3 and ISBN 978-2-86227-428-7.
