= Richard Anthony (singer) =

French singer

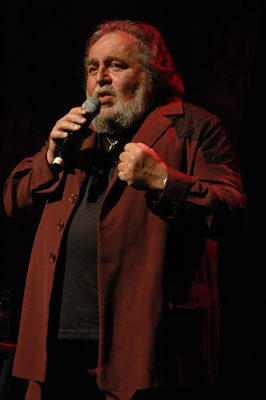
- Richard Anthony in 2006

Background information
- Born: Ricardo Anthony Btesh; 13 January 1938; Cairo, Kingdom of Egypt
- Died: 19 April 2015 (aged 77) Pégomas, France
- Genres: French pop; rock and roll
- Occupations: Singer; songwriter
- Years active: 1958–1990s
- Website: richard-anthony.fr.gd

Richard Anthony (born Ricardo Anthony Btesh; 13 January 1938 – 19 April 2015) was an Egyptian-born French pop singer who had his greatest success in the 1960s and 1970s.

== Life and career ==
He was born in Cairo, Egypt, to a Syrian Jewish family of prominent industrialists and diplomats. As a child he lived in Egypt and Argentina, as well as studying at Brighton College in England. From 1951, he studied at Lycée Janson-de-Sailly and settled in Paris. He started studying law, but after his father's sudden death in 1956 became a door-to-door salesman to help support his family. He also began playing saxophone in Paris nightclubs.

In 1958, as Richard Anthony, he made his first recordings as a singer, initially recording French language versions of American pop hits. These included "Tu m'étais destinée" ("You Are My Destiny"), "Peggy Sue", and "Nouvelle vague" ("Three Cool Cats") which became successful in France. In the early 1960s he became one of the biggest French pop stars, with other hits including "Let's Twist Again", "C’est ma fête" ("It's My Party"), and "Et j'entends siffler le train" ("500 Miles"). He started recording at the Abbey Road Studios in England, and reached the UK singles chart with the English-language songs "Walking Alone" (No. 37, 1963) and "If I Loved You" (No. 18, 1964). One of his songs, "I Don't Know What To Do", arranged by Ivor Raymonde, was released in the US in 1965 by Motown Records on the V.I.P. label, making Anthony the first European artist to appear for that company.

He recorded the Rolling Stones' "Ruby Tuesday" as "Fille sauvage" in 1966, and his song "Aranjuez mon amour", based on Joaquín Rodrigo's Concierto de Aranjuez, became one of his biggest international hits in 1967. He remained popular in France, having one of his biggest hits in 1974 with "Amoureux de ma femme", which was a cover version of an Italian song originally by Caterina Caselli. Most of his recordings are cover versions in French. In the late 1970s, he remarried and moved to Los Angeles for several years. After returning to France in 1982, he continued to record, perform, and appear on TV shows, and in 1998 published an autobiography, Il faut croire aux étoiles. Over his career, his total record sales were estimated to be at least 60 million.

He died in 2015, aged 77.

== Discography ==
- Tu m’étais destinée (1958) – You Are My Destiny
- Peggy Sue (1958) – Peggy Sue
- Suzie Darling (1958)
- La do da da (1958)
- Nouvelle vague (1959) – Three Cool Cats
- Jéricho (1959) – Joshua Fit' the Battle
- Tu parles trop (1960) – You Talk Too Much
- Clémentine (1960) – Clementine
- Itsy bitsy petit bikini (1960) – Itsy Bitsy Teenie Weenie Yellow Polka Dot Bikini
- Dis-lui que je l’aime (1961)
- Écoute dans le vent (1961) – Blowin' in the Wind, Bob Dylan
- Ça tourne rond (1961) – African Waltz
- Let's twist again (1961) – Let's Twist Again
- Fiche le camp, Jack (1961) – Hit the Road Jack
- Noël (1961)
- Tu peux la prendre (1961 ou 1962) – You Can Have Her
- Leçon de twist (1962)
- Délivre-moi (1962) – Unchain My Heart
- J’entends siffler le train (1962) – Five Hundred Miles – This sold over one million copies, and was awarded a gold disc by the RIAA.
- Ne boude pas (1962) - Take Five
- Faits pour s’aimer (1962) - Desafinado
- On twiste sur le locomotion (1963) – The Loco-Motion
- En écoutant la pluie (1963) – Rhythm of the Rain
- C’est ma fête (1963) – It's My Party
- Tchin tchin (1963)
- Donne-moi ma chance (1963) – Too Late To Worry
- Ce Monde (1964) – You're My World / Il mio mondo
- À présent tu peux t’en aller (1964) – I Only Want to Be with You
- À toi de choisir (1964) – Swinging on a Star
- La Corde au cou (1965) – I Should Have Known Better
- Je me suis souvent demandé (1965)
- Au revoir mon amour (1965) – Goodbye My Love
- Jamais je ne vivrai sans toi (1965) – You Don't Have to Say You Love Me
- The night (La nuit) (1965), by Salvatore Adamo
- Hello Pussycat (1966) – What's New Pussycat?
- La Terre promise (1966) – California Dreaming
- Sunny (1966) – Sunny
- Aranjuez, mon Amour (1967) inspired by Concierto de Aranjuez by Joaquín Rodrigo
- Le Grand Meaulnes (1967) – Le Grand Meaulnes, song inspired by a novel by the French author Alain-Fournier
- Inch'Allah (1967) in Arabic, by Salvatore Adamo
- Un homme en enfer (1968)
- L’Été (1968)
- Les Ballons (1968) – Little Arrows
- Le Sirop Typhon (1969) – Lily the Pink
- Les Petits Cochons (1969)
- L’An 2005 (1969) – In the Year 2525
- Bien l’bonjour (1970)
- Na na hé hé espoir (1970) – Na Na Hey Hey Kiss Him Goodbye
- Il pleut des larmes (1970) – La Nave del Olvido
- Non stop (1977) – Don't Stop
- New York (1978)
- Señora la dueña (1970) – Lady D'Arbanville
- San Diego (1970)
- Et après (1971) by Salvatore Adamo
- Un soleil rouge (1971)
- Tibo (1971)
- Maggy May (1971) – Maggie May
- Sans toi (1972) – Without You
- Victoire je t’aime (1973)
- Marie-Jeanne (1973)
- Amoureux de ma femme (1974) – Nessuno mi può giudicare by Caterina Caselli
- Nathalie (1975)
- Chanson de dix sous (1975) – I Can't Stay Mad at You
- De la musique républicaine (1976)
- Voilà pourquoi je l’aime (1976)
- À l’aube du dernier jour (1977)
- Minuit (1980) – MemOry
- Los Angeles (1981)
- Elle m’attend (1983)
- T'aimer d’amour (1985)
- Barrière des générations (1990)
- Le rap pas innocent – Ronymix 98 (1998)
- Et je m'en vais – Then I Kissed Her
- Autant chercher à retenir le vent (1965) – Catch the Wind
- Je n'ai que toi – All by Myself
- Le soleil ne brille plus (1966) – The Sun Ain't Gonna Shine Anymore
- J'irai pleurer sous la pluie – Crying in the Rain
- Après toi – The Next Time
- Un papillon qui vole (1966) – Elusive Butterfly

== See also ==
- List of French singers
- French popular music
- Music of France
