= Jesse Lee Turner =

- Born: 1938 (age 86–87)
- Genres: Rockabilly; country
- Years active: 1958–present

Jesse Lee Turner (born 1938) is a former American singer. He recorded songs for several labels in the late 1950s, including the one-hit wonder "Little Space Girl".

Turner was born in Addicks, Texas, United States, and graduated from high school in Boling, Texas. His first recording was the single "Teenage Misery" for Fraternity Records. In 1958, he released the single "Little Space Girl" b/w "Shake Baby Shake" on Carlton Records; the tune hit No. 20 on the Billboard Hot 100 and was No. 5 for 2 weeks on Canada's CHUM Chart in 1959. The follow-up "Thinkin'" failed to chart, and Turner switched to Top Rank Records to release "Do I Worry", which also sold poorly. Moving to Sudden Records, he wrote and issued "The Elopers" to no success; GNP Records also released "Ballad of Billy Sol Estes" and a second single.

In 1978, Turner produced, wrote, and starred in the Smokey and the Bandit-inspired comedy western, Smokey and the Good Time Outlaws. Turner composed and performed several songs in the film, which was initially released to drive-ins as J.D and the Salt Flat Kid; his co-star was mainstay exploitation film actor, Dennis Fimple and country music star, Dianne Sherrill.

Turner's output comprises 15 known songs; most of which have been reissued on the CD, Shake, Baby, Shake. He currently lives in Texas.
