= Fred Buscaglione =

Italian singer and actor (1921–1960)

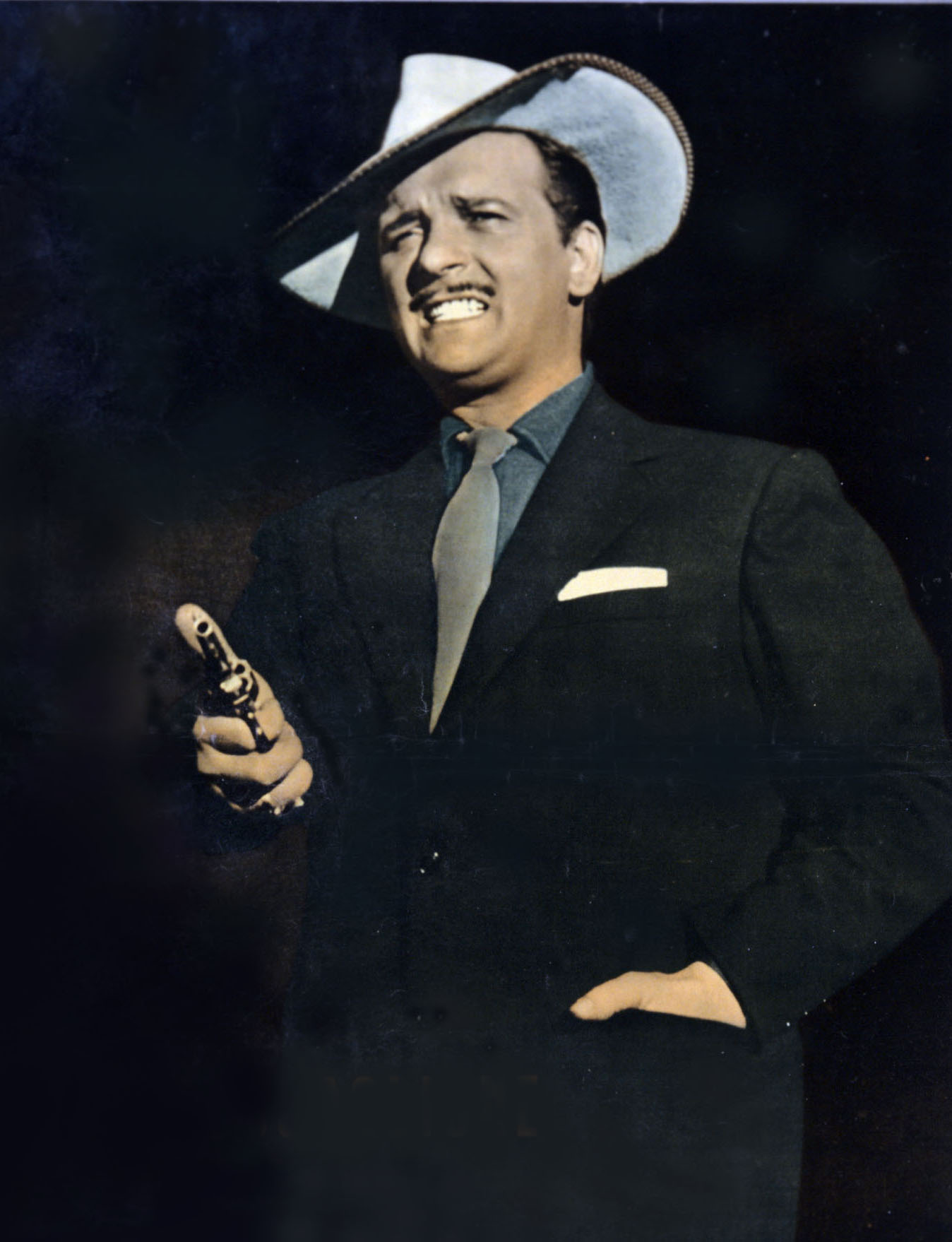
- Buscaglione in a scene from The Thieves (1959)

Background information
- Born: Ferdinando Buscaglione; 23 November 1921; Turin, Piedmont, Kingdom of Italy
- Died: 3 February 1960 (aged 38) Rome, Lazio, Italy
- Education: Turin Conservatory
- Genres: Swing; light music
- Occupations: Singer-songwriter; actor
- Instrument: Vocals
- Years active: 1939 –1960
- Labels: VdP; Durium; Fonit Cetra; Ri-Fi
- Spouse: Fatima Robin's (m. 1949)

Ferdinando "Fred" Buscaglione (Italian pronunciation: [ˈfrɛd buskaʎˈʎoːne]; 23 November 1921 – 3 February 1960) was an Italian singer and actor who became very popular in the late 1950s. His public persona – the character he played both in his songs and his movies – was of a humorous mobster with a penchant for whisky and women.

== Biography ==
Ferdinando Buscaglione was born in Turin on 23 November 1921. The father was a painter and the mother a porter and piano teacher, both coming from Graglia, his great passion for music appeared at a very young age. When he was 11, his parents enrolled him at the Giuseppe Verdi Conservatory in Turin. During his teen years, he performed at nightclubs in Turin singing jazz and playing double bass and violin.

During World War II, he was incarcerated in an American internment camp in Sardinia. His musical talent was apparent and he was allowed to join the orchestra of the allied radio station of Cagliari. This permitted Buscaglione to continue to make music and to experiment with new sounds and rhythms coming from the U.S. (Most foreign music had been officially forbidden by the Italian Fascist regime.)

After the war, Buscaglione returned to Turin and went to live in Via Eusebio Bava 26 bis and resumed working as a musician for various bands. He then formed his own group, the Asternovas. During a tour in Switzerland in 1949 he met and married the Moroccan-German entertainer Fatima Robin's. In the meantime he was gradually creating his public character, inspired by Clark Gable and Mickey Spillane's gangsters. His friend Leo Chiosso was a lyricist who wrote many of his songs. Together they wrote the hits that brought nationwide fame to Buscaglione: Che bambola (Whatta babe!), Teresa non sparare (Theresa, don't shoot!), Eri piccola così (You were small like that), Guarda che luna (Look, What A (beautiful) Moon), Love in Portofino, Porfirio Villarosa (a caricature of Porfirio Rubirosa), Whisky facile (Easy Whiskey).

After perfecting his routine in night clubs and theatres he started recording his songs in 1955; the first single (a shellac 78 rpm record containing 'Che bambola' and 'Giacomino') sold 1,000,000 copies with close to no promotion, propelling him to a degree of fame he never considered possible.

By the end of the 1950s, Buscaglione was one of Italy's most wanted entertainers. He appeared in advertising campaigns, on television, and in movies.

At 38 years of age, he was killed in a car accident when his lilac Ford Thunderbird collided with a truck Lancia Esatau in the early hours before dawn in Rome. Immediately brought to the hospital in a bus flagged down by the truck driver, he arrived there too late. Only hours earlier he had dinner with some friends at a restaurant in Rome and met future Italian pop diva Mina Mazzini who made her Sanremo Music Festival debut earlier. The two discussed a future collaboration that sadly never materialized. Tens of thousands people attended his funeral in Turin on 6 February 1960. He is buried in the Cimitero Monumentale.

Alongside his legacy, in songs and movies, Buscaglione deserves mention for having encouraged musicians and singers from the newer generation (the one influenced by the earliest forms of rock and roll) to stand up against the conservative producers and discographers of the time, demanding recognition for their art and their style. In this role, he proved instrumental in the rise of the "yellers" scene which from the early 60s started to revolutionize the Italian popular music panorama.

== Discography ==
- Fred Buscaglione & i suoi Asternovas – Cetra, LPA 42 (1956)
- Fred Buscaglione & i suoi Asternovas – Cetra, LPA 47 (1956)
- Le nuove canzoni di Fred Buscaglione – Cetra, LPA 92 (1957)
- Balliamo con Fred Buscaglione – Cetra, LPA 93 (1957)
- Fred Buscaglione & i suoi Asternovas – Cetra, LPA 108 (1958)
- Fred Buscaglione & i suoi Asternovas - Cetra, LP16 N. 3 (1958)
- 16 successi di Fred Buscaglione – Cetra, LPB 35007 (1959)
- Fred Buscaglione & i suoi Asternovas - Cetra, LP16 N. 5 (1959)
- Ricordo di Fred – Fonit Cetra, LPF 1 (1960)

== Filmography ==
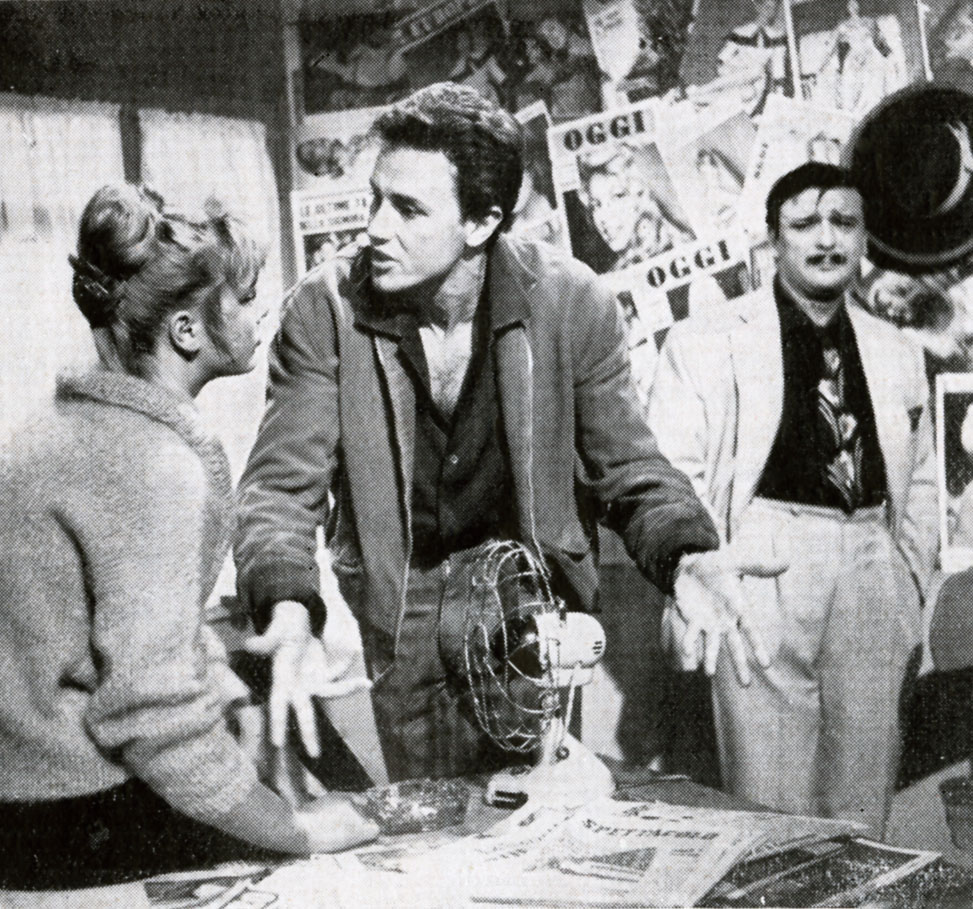
Fred Buscaglione in I ragazzi del Juke-Box

- Poveri milionari (1959)
- I ladri (1959)
- Guardatele ma non toccatele (1959)
- Noi siamo due evasi (1959)
- Il moralista (1959)
- I ragazzi del Juke-Box (1959)
- La duchessa di Santa Lucia (1959)
- La cento chilometri (1959)
- Noi duri (1960)
- Tu che ne dici? (1960)
