= Les Enfants du Pirée =

- Cover of EP

Single by Dalida

from the album Les Enfants du Pirée
- Language: French
- Released: June 1960
- Recorded: June 2, 1960
- Studio: Hoche
- Genre: Chanson; vocal
- Length: 2:34
- Label: Barclay
- Composer: Manos Hadjidakis
- Lyricist: Jacques Larue

"Les Enfants du Pirée" ("The Children of Piraeus") is a French song by singer Dalida, first released on EP in June 1960 and included in her eponymous album from the same year. A big international summer hit and one of the major successes of Dalida's career, the song is a cover of "Ta paidia tou Peiraia", written by Manos Hadjidakis and sung by Melina Mercouri in the Greek movie Never on Sunday (Pote tin Kyriaki), which was nominated for a total of 8 Oscars and won one for Best Original Song for this piece of music.

== Charts ==
| Chart | Peak position |
|---|---|
| Belgium (Ultratop Flanders) | 2 |
| Belgium (Ultratop Wallonia) | 1 |
| Canada (BAnQ) | 2 |
| France (Bourse des chansons) | 1 |
| France (Music Hall Charts) | 1 |
| Italy | 2 |
| Netherlands | 2 |
| Spain | 1 |

== Bibliography ==
- L'argus Dalida: Discographie mondiale et cotations, by Daniel Lesueur, Éditions Alternatives, 2004. ISBN 2-86227-428-3 and ISBN 978-2-86227-428-7. (in French)
