= 1959 in music =

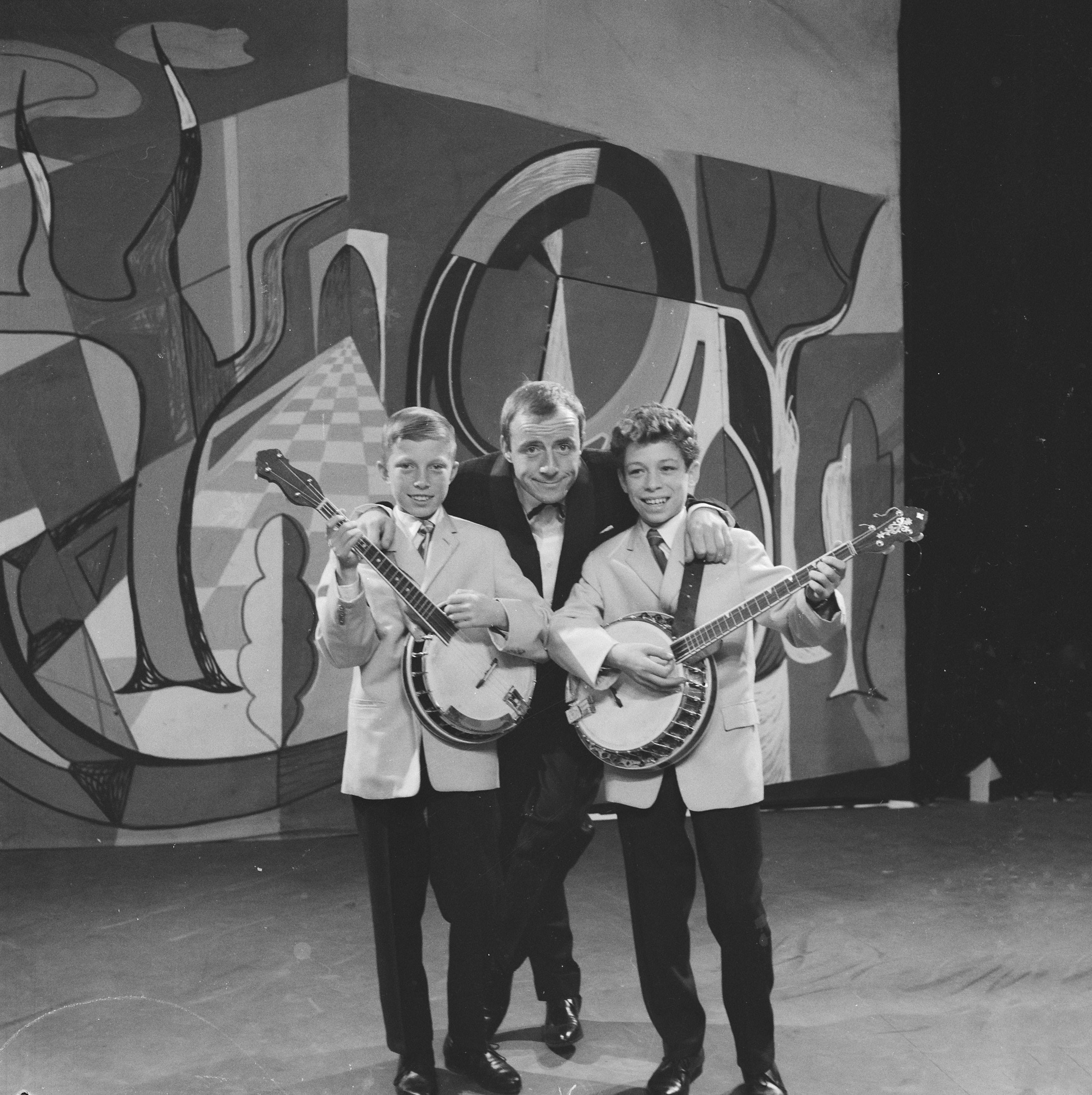

This is a list of notable events in music that took place in the year 1959.

== Specific locations ==
- 1959 in British music
- 1959 in Norwegian music

== Specific genres ==
- 1959 in country music
- 1959 in jazz

== Events ==
- January 5 – The first sessions for Ella Fitzgerald's George and Ira Gershwin Songbook are held.
- January 12 – Tamla Records is founded by Berry Gordy Jr. in Detroit, Michigan.
- January 22 – Buddy Holly records some acoustic demos in his New York City apartment, the last songs he will record. Songs included "Peggy Sue Got Married", "Crying, Waiting, Hoping", "Learning the Game", "What to Do", "That's What They Say", and "That Makes It Tough."
- January 29 – The first Melodifestivalen, an annual Swedish music competition that determines the country's representative for the Eurovision Song Contest, is held in Stockholm.
- January 31 - Nicola Paone's recording of his song Blah, Blah, Blah reaches Cash Box Magazine's list of "Top 100 Singles".
- February 3 – "The Day the Music Died": Buddy Holly, Ritchie Valens and The Big Bopper are killed in a plane crash in Iowa. Future country star Waylon Jennings was scheduled to be on the plane, but instead gave his seat up to The Big Bopper.
- March 2–April 22 – The recording sessions for the extremely influential Miles Davis jazz album Kind of Blue take place at the CBS 30th Street Studio in New York City. The album is released on August 17 in the United States, opening with Davis' "So What" and including the Davis-Bill Evans composition "Blue in Green".
- March 11 – The 4th Eurovision Song Contest is held in Cannes, France, and won by the Netherlands with the song "Een beetje" performed by Teddy Scholten.
- April 3 – The BBC in the United Kingdom bans The Coasters song "Charlie Brown" because of the word "spitball", a decision it reverses later in the month.
- April 24 – The Your Hit Parade television series airs its last episode in the United States.
- May 4 – The 1st Annual Grammy Awards are held in Los Angeles. Henry Mancini's The Music from Peter Gunn wins Album of the Year, while Domenico Modugno's song "Nel blu, dipinto di blu (Volare)" wins both Record of the Year and Song of the Year.
- May 12 – Plácido Domingo makes his stage debut at the Teatro Degollado in Guadalajara as Pascual in Marina.
- May 30 – Helge Rosvaenge gives his farewell concert at Vienna's Great Musikvereinsaal.
- June 11 – Violence erupts at the Seventh Festival of Neapolitan Song in a scandal that sparks a parliamentary inquiry amidst accusations of corruption and involvement of organized crime in a song competition that is seen to have become increasingly commercialised.
- July–November – Alan Lomax and English singer Shirley Collins make a folksong collecting trip in the Southern United States during which they 'discover' Mississippi Fred McDowell.
- August 25–September 5 – Darmstädter Ferienkurse held in Darmstadt, with lectures by Włodzimierz Kotoński, György Ligeti, Andrzej Markowski, Yoritsune Matsudaira, Werner Meyer-Eppler, Luigi Nono, Henri Pousseur, Karlheinz Stockhausen and Bo Wallner, and world premieres of Claude Baillif's Mouvements pour deux, Sylvano Bussotti's Piano Pieces for David Tudor, Cornelius Cardew's Two Books of Study for Pianists and Piano Piece 1959, Niccolo Castiglioni's Cangiati per pianoforte, Roman Haubenstock-Ramati's Interpolation: Mobile pour flûte, Mauricio Kagel's Transición II, Angelo Paccagnini's Canti brevi: secondo libro, and Stockhausen's Zyklus.
- September 13 – Bo Diddley's single "Say Man" enters the US R&B charts.
- November 29 – Though they are held in the same year as the inaugural ceremony, the 2nd Annual Grammy Awards are held in Los Angeles and New York and are notable for being the first televised Grammy Award ceremony. Frank Sinatra's Come Dance with Me! wins Album of the Year, Bobby Darin's version of "Mack the Knife" wins Record of the Year and Jimmy Driftwood's song "The Battle of New Orleans" wins Song of the Year. Darin is also awarded Best New Artist.
- Fall – Bill Haley & His Comets end their groundbreaking association with Decca Records, for whom they have recorded since 1954. Their first recording for the label, "Rock Around the Clock", helped usher in the rock and roll era. Haley signs with Warner Bros. Records.
- Joan Baez performs at the first Newport Folk Festival as a surprise guest and becomes an underground favorite
- Otto Luening and Vladimir Ussachevsky co-found the Columbia-Princeton Electronic Music Center in New York City.
- The National Academy of Recording Arts and Sciences in the United States sponsors the first Grammy Award ceremony for music recorded in 1958.
- Dalida receives a Music Oscar for Best Song and a first foreign award (a "Golden Lion" in Berlin).
- Jacques Loussier releases Play Bach No.1 with bassist Pierre Michelot and percussionist Christian Garros.
- Ornette Coleman plays a legendary and controversial concert at New York's Five Spot.
- Roy Orbison signs with Monument Records.
- The Supremes are founded as a quartet ("The Primettes").
- Jimi Hendrix buys his first electric guitar: a White Single pickup Supro Ozark 1560 S.
- Veteran sarodiya and multi-instrumentalist Allauddin Khan records for All India Radio.
- Jilin opera is developed in China.
- Approximate date – Ballads and Blues folk club founded by Ewan MacColl and others in a London pub in Soho as part of the second British folk revival.

== Albums released (in alphabetical order) ==
- An Evening Wasted with Tom Lehrer – Tom Lehrer
- At Large – The Kingston Trio
- Ballad of the Blues – Jo Stafford
- Berry Is on Top – Chuck Berry
- Bill Haley's Chicks – Bill Haley & His Comets
- Blind Joe Death – John Fahey
- The Cats – John Coltrane
- Cattin' with Coltrane and Quinichette – John Coltrane & Paul Quinichette
- Chega De Saudade – João Gilberto
- Cliff – Cliff Richard (debut) ('Live' and with 'The Drifters')
- Cliff Sings – Cliff Richard
- Come Dance with Me! – Frank Sinatra
- Como Swings – Perry Como
- Cuttin' Capers – Doris Day
- A Date with Elvis – Elvis Presley
- Dinah, Yes Indeed! – Dinah Shore
- Dreams of Italy – Johnny Cole
- Ella Fitzgerald Sings Sweet Songs for Swingers – Ella Fitzgerald
- Ella Fitzgerald Sings the George and Ira Gershwin Songbook – Ella Fitzgerald
- Everybody Digs Bill Evans – Bill Evans
- 50,000,000 Elvis Fans Can't Be Wrong – Elvis Presley
- For LP Fans Only – Elvis Presley
- ...from the "Hungry i" – The Kingston Trio (live)
- The Genius of Ray Charles – Ray Charles
- Get Happy! – Ella Fitzgerald
- Go Bo Diddley – Bo Diddley
- Greatest! – Johnny Cash
- Gunfighter Ballads and Trail Songs – Marty Robbins
- Here We Go Again! – The Kingston Trio
- How to Speak Hip – Del Close and John Brent
- Hymns by Johnny Cash – Johnny Cash
- I'll Be Seeing You – Jo Stafford
- I'm Nobody's Baby – Jo Ann Campbell
- A Jazz Portrait of Frank Sinatra – Oscar Peterson
- Kind of Blue – Miles Davis
- Let's All Sing with The Chipmunks - Alvin and the Chipmunks (debut)
- Liturgical Jazz – Ed Summerlin
- Lonely Street – Andy Williams
- Look to Your Heart – Frank Sinatra
- Love in Portofino (A San Cristina) – Dalida
- Mingus Ah Um – Charles Mingus
- Moanin' in the Moonlight – Howlin' Wolf (debut)
- Newk's Time – Sonny Rollins
- No One Cares – Frank Sinatra
- ¡Olé Tormé!: Mel Tormé Goes South of the Border with Billy May – Mel Tormé
- Once Upon a Summertime – Blossom Dearie
- Persuasive Percussion – Terry Snyder and the All Stars
- Porgy and Bess – Miles Davis
- Ricky Sings Again – Ricky Nelson
- Ritchie Valens – Ritchie Valens
- Season's Greetings from Perry Como – Perry Como
- The Shape of Jazz to Come – Ornette Coleman
- The Song You Heard When You Fell in Love – Betty Johnson
- Songs by Ricky – Ricky Nelson
- Songs of our Soil – Johnny Cash
- Stereo Concert – The Kingston Trio (live)
- Strictly Instrumental – Bill Haley & His Comets
- Swing Along – The Four Lads
- Swing Me an Old Song – Julie London
- That's All - Bobby Darin
- This Game of Love - Vic Damone
- Time Out – Dave Brubeck Quartet
- Vaughan and Violins – Sarah Vaughan
- What a Diff'rence a Day Makes! – Dinah Washington
- Your Number Please – Julie London

== Biggest hit singles ==
The following songs achieved the highest chart positions in the charts of 1959.

#	Artist	Title	Year	Country	Chart Entries
1	Bobby Darin	Mack the Knife	1959	US	UK 1 – Sep 1959, US BB 1 – Sep 1959, US BB 1 of 1959, US CashBox 1 of 1959, Canada 1 – Aug 1959, Grammy in 1959, POP 1 of 1959, DDD 3 of 1959, Norway 9 – Nov 1959, South Africa 13 of 1959, RYM 15 of 1959, RIAA 15, Italy 38 of 1960, Europe 88 of the 1950s, Party 226 of 1999, Rolling Stone 251, Acclaimed 407, WXPN 518
2	Johnny Horton	The Battle of New Orleans	1959	US	US BB 1 – May 1959, Canada 1 – May 1959, Australia 1 for 5 weeks Dec 1958, US CashBox 2 of 1959, Australia 9 of 1959, UK 16 – Jun 1959, South Africa 17 of 1959, RYM 19 of 1959, US BB 38 of 1959, POP 38 of 1959, DDD 47 of 1959, RIAA 333, Acclaimed 821
3	Lloyd Price	Personality	1959	US	Australia 1 for 4 weeks Nov 1958, US BB 2 – May 1959, Canada 2 – May 1959, Australia 5 of 1959, US CashBox 6 of 1959, Norway 6 – Jul 1959, South Africa 12 of 1959, UK 25 – Aug 1959, US BB 33 of 1959, POP 33 of 1959, Europe 36 of the 1950s, DDD 56 of 1959, RYM 85 of 1959, Acclaimed 2027
4	Lloyd Price	Stagger Lee	1959	US	US BB 1 – Jan 1959, Canada 3 – Dec 1958, South Africa 5 of 1959, UK 7 – Feb 1959, Norway 8 – Apr 1959, US CashBox 11 of 1959, DDD 23 of 1958, US BB 28 of 1959, POP 28 of 1959, RYM 31 of 1958, Europe 86 of the 1950s, Rolling Stone 456, Acclaimed 1013
5	Frankie Avalon	Venus	1959	US	US BB 1 – Feb 1959, Canada 1 – Feb 1959, Australia 1 for 2 weeks Oct 1958, US CashBox 3 of 1959, RYM 4 of 1959, Italy 6 of 1959, South Africa 6 of 1959, Australia 15 of 1959, UK 16 – Apr 1959

== Top hits on record (in alphabetical order) ==
- "A Big Hunk o' Love" – Elvis Presley
- "A Boy Without a Girl" – Frankie Avalon
- "All for the Love of a Girl" – Johnny Horton
- "(All of a Sudden) My Heart Sings" – Paul Anka
- "Among My Souvenirs" – Connie Francis
- "The Battle of New Orleans" – Johnny Horton
- "Beachcomber" – Jo Ann Campbell
- "Beyond the Sea" – Bobby Darin
- "The Big Hurt" – Toni Fisher
- "Billy Bayou" – Jim Reeves
- "Bobby Sox to Stockings" – Frankie Avalon
- "Ciao, Ciao Bambina" – Dalida
- "C'mon Everybody" – Eddie Cochran
- "Come Softly to Me" – The Fleetwoods
- "Crying, Waiting, Hoping" – Buddy Holly
- "Don't You Know?" – Della Reese
- "Donna" – Ritchie Valens
- "Dream Lover" – Bobby Darin
- "Driftin" – The Drifters (B-side to "Jet Black")
- "Dynamite" – Cliff Richard and The Shadows
- "El Paso" – Marty Robbins
- "Enchanted" – The Platters
- "Expresso Bongo" (EP) – Cliff Richard and The Shadows
- "First Name Initial" – Annette
- "(Now and Then There's) A Fool Such as I" – Elvis Presley
- "Feelin' Fine" – The Drifters
- "Forty Miles of Bad Road" – Duane Eddy
- "Goodbye Baby" – Jack Scott
- "Goodbye Jimmy, Goodbye" – Kathy Linden
- "Gotta Travel On" – Billy Grammer
- "The Happy Organ" – Dave "Baby" Cortez
- "Heartaches by the Number" – Guy Mitchell
- "He'll Have to Go" – Jim Reeves
- "Hey Little Girl" - Dee Clark
- "High Hopes" – Frank Sinatra
- "How About That" - Dee Clark
- "I'm Blue Again" – Patsy Cline
- "I Only Have Eyes for You" – The Flamingos
- "I Really Really Love You" – Jo Ann Campbell
- "It Doesn't Matter Anymore" – Buddy Holly
- "It Was I" – Skip & Flip
- "It's All in the Game" – Tommy Edwards
- "It's Just a Matter of Time" – Brook Benton
- "It's Only The Good Times" – Tommy Edwards
- "I've Had It" – The Bell Notes
- "I Wanna Be Loved" – Ricky Nelson
- "J'ai rêvé" – Dalida
- "Jet Black" – The Drifters
- "Just Ask Your Heart" – Frankie Avalon
- "Just a Little Too Much" – Ricky Nelson
- "Just Keep It Up" - Dee Clark
- "Kansas City" – Wilbert Harrison
- "Kissin' Time" – Bobby Rydell
- "Kookie, Kookie (Lend Me Your Comb)" – Edward Byrnes and Connie Stevens
- "La Bamba" – Ritchie Valens
- "Let's Jump the Broomstick" – Brenda Lee
- "Lipstick on Your Collar" – Connie Francis
- "Livin' Lovin' Doll" – Cliff Richard and The Drifters
- "Living Doll" – Cliff Richard and The Drifters
- "Lonely Boy" – Paul Anka
- "Lonely Street" – Andy Williams
- "Lonesome Fella" – The Shadows (B-side to "Saturday Dance")
- "Lonesome Town" – Ricky Nelson
- "Love in Portofino (A San Cristina)" – Dalida
- "Love Potion Number Nine" – The Clovers
- "M.T.A." – The Kingston Trio
- "Mack the Knife" – Bobby Darin
- "Manhattan Spiritual" – Reg Owen Orchestra
- "Mean Streak" – Cliff Richard and The Drifters
- "Mr. Blue" – The Fleetwoods
- "Misty" – Johnny Mathis
- "My Happiness" – Connie Francis (released in 1958).
- "Morgen" – Ivo Robic
- "My Heart Is an Open Book" – Carl Dobkins Jr.
- "Never Be Anyone Else But You" – Ricky Nelson
- "Never Mind" – Cliff Richard and The Drifters (B-side to "Mean Streak")
- "Non Dimenticar" – Nat King Cole
- "Peggy Sue Got Married" – Buddy Holly
- "Personality" – Lloyd Price
- "Peter Gunn" – Duane Eddy, Ray Anthony and His Orchestra
- "Pillow Talk" – Doris Day
- "Pink Shoe Laces – Dodie Stevens
- "Poison Ivy" – The Coasters
- "Poor Jenny" – The Everly Brothers
- "Plenty Good Lovin" – Connie Francis
- "Put Your Head on My Shoulder" – Paul Anka
- "Raining in My Heart" – Buddy Holly
- "Roberta" – Frankie Ford
- "Rockin' Mother" – Frankie Laine
- "Rocks and Gravel" – Frankie Laine
- "Rummy Polka" – Matys Brothers
- "Running Bear" – Johnny Preston
- "Saturday Dance" – The Shadows
- "Sea Cruise" – Frankie Ford
- "Sea of Love" – Phil Phillips
- "Since I Don't Have You" – The Skyliners
- "Sleep Walk" – Santo & Johnny
- "Small World" – Johnny Mathis
- "So Fine" – The Fiestas
- "So Many Ways" – Brook Benton
- "Some Kind-A Earthquake" – Duane Eddy
- "Sorry (I Ran All the Way Home)" – The Impalas
- "Stagger Lee" – Lloyd Price
- "Sweeter Than You" – Ricky Nelson
- "Sweet Nothin's" – Brenda Lee
- "Take a Message to Mary"– The Everly Brothers
- "Tall Oak Tree" – Dorsey Burnette
- "Tallahassee Lassie" – Freddy Cannon
- "A Teenager in Love" – Dion and the Belmonts
- "That's Why (I Love You So)" – Jackie Wilson
- "The Three Bells" – The Browns
- "There Goes My Baby" – The Drifters
- "The Tijuana Jail" – The Kingston Trio
- "(Till) I Kissed You" – The Everly Brothers
- "Till There Was You" – Anita Bryant
- "Travellin' Light – Cliff Richard and The Shadows (B-side to "Dynamite")
- "(If You Cry) True Love, True Love"/"Dance with Me" – The Drifters
- "The Twist" – Hank Ballard
- "Venus" – Frankie Avalon
- "The Village of St. Bernadette" – Andy Williams
- "What About Us" – The Coasters
- "What a Difference a Day Makes" – Dinah Washington
- "What Am I Living For" – Ernest Tubb
- "What'd I Say" – Ray Charles
- "Where the Boys Are" – Connie Francis
- "Why" – Frankie Avalon
- "A Worried Man" – The Kingston Trio
- "Yep!" – Duane Eddy

== Published popular music ==
- "77 Sunset Strip" w.m. Mack David & Jerry Livingston
- "Along Came Jones" w.m. Jerry Leiber & Mike Stoller
- "All My Tomorrows" w. Sammy Cahn m. Jimmy Van Heusen, from the film A Hole in the Head
- "Alvin's Harmonica" w.m. Ross Bagdasarian
- "Angela Jones" w.m. John D. Loudermilk
- "Anyone Would Love You" w.m. Harold Rome. Introduced by Andy Griffith and Dolores Gray in the musical Destry Rides Again
- "The Battle of New Orleans" trad arr. Jimmy Driftwood
- "The Best Is Yet to Come" w. Carolyn Leigh m. Cy Coleman
- "The Best of Everything" w. Sammy Cahn m. Alfred Newman, from the film The Best of Everything
- "A Big Hunk o' Love" w. m. Aaron Schroeder & Sid Wyche
- "Big Iron" w.m. Marty Robbins
- "Breaking Up Is Hard To Do" w.m. Neil Sedaka & Howard Greenfield
- "The Children's Marching Song" trad arr. Malcolm Arnold. Performed by Ingrid Bergman and The Orphans' Chorus in the film Inn of the Sixth Happiness
- "China Doll" w.m. Cindy Walker
- "China Tea" m. Russ Conway
- "Ciao, Ciao, Bambina" w.(Eng) Mitchell Parish (Ital) Eduardo Verde & Domenico Modugno m. Domenico Modugno
- "Climb Ev'ry Mountain" w. Oscar Hammerstein II m. Richard Rodgers. Introduced by Patricia Neway in the musical Sound of Music
- "Come Softly To Me" w.m. Gary Troxel, Barbara Ellis & Gretchen Christopher
- "Delaware" w.m. Irving Gordon
- "Don't You Know?" w.m. adapt. Bobby Worth
- "Do-Re-Mi" w. Oscar Hammerstein II m. Richard Rodgers. Introduced by Mary Martin in the musical Sound of Music. Sung by Julie Andrews in the film version.
- "Dream Lover" w.m. Bobby Darin
- "Early In The Morning" adapt Bruce Belland & Glen Larson
- "Edelweiss" w. Oscar Hammerstein II m. Richard Rodgers. Introduced by Mary Martin in the musical Sound of Music. Sung by Julie Andrews and Christopher Plummer in the film version.
- "El Paso" w.m. Marty Robbins
- "Endlessly" w.m. Clyde Otis & Brook Benton
- "Everything's Coming Up Roses" w. Stephen Sondheim m. Jule Styne. Introduced by Ethel Merman in the musical Gypsy. Sung in the film version by Lisa Kirk dubbing for Rosalind Russell.
- "Frankie" w. Howard Greenfield m. Neil Sedaka
- "Game Of Poker" w. Johnny Mercer m. Harold Arlen, from the musical Saratoga
- "Goodbye Jimmy, Goodbye" w.m. Jack Vaughn
- "Greenfields" w.m. Terry Gilkyson, Richard Dehr & Frank Miller
- "Handy Man" w.m. Otis Blackwell & Jimmy Jones
- "The Hanging Tree" w. Mack David m. Jerry Livingston. Introduced by Marty Robbins in the film The Hanging Tree
- "Happy Anniversary" w. Al Stillman m. Robert Allen
- "The Happy Organ" w.m. Kurt Wood, David Clowney & James Kreigsmann
- "Heartaches By The Number" w.m. Harlan Howard
- "He'll Have To Go" w.m. Joe Allison & Audrey Allison
- "High Hopes" w. Sammy Cahn m. Jimmy Van Heusen. Introduced by Frank Sinatra and Eddie Hodges in the film A Hole in the Head.
- "I Ain't Never" w.m. Mel Tillis
- "I Feel Sorry For The Girl" w.m. Glenn Paxton, Robert Goldman & George Weiss
- "I Know" w.m. Carl Stutz & Edith Lindeman
- "I Need Your Love Tonight" w.m. Sid Wayne & Bix Reichner
- "I Wanna Be Around" w.m. Johnny Mercer & Sadie Vimmerstedt
- "If I Ever Fall In Love Again" w. Peter Wildeblood m. Peter Greenwell
- "I'll Never Fall In Love Again" Johnnie Ray
- "I'm Gonna Get Married" w.m. Lloyd Price & Harold Logan
- "I'm Looking Out the Window" John Jacob Niles, Don Raye
- "I'm Never Gonna Tell" Hoffman, Manning, Markwell
- "In A Little While" w. Marshall Barer m. Mary Rodgers
- "It Doesn't Matter Anymore" w.m. Paul Anka
- "Kansas City" w.m. Jerry Leiber & Mike Stoller
- "Kookie, Kookie (Lend Me Your Comb)" w.m. Irving Taylor
- "Let Me Entertain You" w. Stephen Sondheim m. Jule Styne. Introduced by Sandra Church and chorus in the musical Gypsy.
- "Like Young" m. André Previn
- "Lipstick On Your Collar" w. Eddie Lewis m. George Goehring
- "Little Donkey" w.m. Eric Boswell
- "The Little Drummer Boy" w.m. adapt. Henry Onorati, Katherine Davis & Harry Simeone
- "Little Tin Box" w. Sheldon Harnick m. Jerry Bock
- "The Little White Bull" Lionel Bart, Michael Pratt, Jimmy Bennett
- "Living Doll" w.m. Lionel Bart
- "Lock Up Your Daughters" w. Lionel Bart m. Laurie Johnson
- "Lonely Blue Boy" Ben Weisman, Fred Wise
- "Lonely Boy" w.m. Paul Anka
- "The Lonely Goatherd" w. Oscar Hammerstein II m. Richard Rodgers. Introduced by Mary Martin and the children in the musical Sound of Music. Performed by Julie Andrews in the film version.
- "Lonely Street" w.m. Carl Belew, Kenny Sowder & W. S. Stevenson
- "Love Potion No. 9" w.m. Jerry Leiber & Mike Stoller
- "Love Will Find Out The Way" w.m. Glenn Paxton, Robert Goldman & George Weiss
- "Lullaby In Ragtime" w.m. Sylvia Fine. Introduced by Danny Kaye in the film The Five Pennies.
- "The M.T.A." w.m. adapt. Jacqueline Steiner & Bess Hawes
- "Maria" w. Oscar Hammerstein II m. Richard Rodgers. Introduced by Patricia Neway, Muriel O'Malley, Elizabeth Howell and Karen Shepard in the musical Sound of Music.
- "Marina" w.(Eng) Ray Maxwell m. Rocco Granata
- "The Mating Game" w. Lee Adams m. Charles Strouse. Theme song from the film The Mating Game
- "May You Always" w.m. Larry Markes & Dick Charles
- "Memphis" w.m. Chuck Berry
- "Milord" w. (Eng) B. G. Lewis (Fr) Joseph Mustacchi m. Marguerite Monnot
- "Morgen" w. (Eng) Noel Sherman (Ger) Peter Mosser m. Peter Mosser
- "Mr. Blue" w.m. Dewayne Blackwell
- "My Favorite Things" w. Oscar Hammerstein II m. Richard Rodgers. Introduced by Patricia Neway and Mary Martin in the musical Sound of Music. Performed in the film version by Julie Andrews.
- "My Heart Is an Open Book" w. Hal David m. Lee Pockriss
- "My Wish Came True" w.m. Ivory Joe Hunter
- "Oh! Carol" w. Howard Greenfield m. Neil Sedaka
- "Only Love Me" w. (Eng) Mann Curtis (Ital) Pinchi m. V. Panzuti
- "Only Sixteen" w.m. Barbara Campbell
- "Personality" w.m. Lloyd Price & Harold Logan
- "Pick Me Up On Your Way Down" w.m. Harlan Howard
- "Pillow Talk" w.m. Buddy Pepper & Inez James. Introduced by Doris Day and Rock Hudson in the film of the same name.
- "La Plume De Ma Tante" w.m. Al Hoffman & Dick Manning
- "Poison Ivy" w.m. Jerry Leiber & Mike Stoller
- "Promise Me A Rose" w.m. Bob Merrill, introduced by Eileen Herlie in the musical Take Me Along
- "Put Your Head on My Shoulder" w.m. Paul Anka
- "Quiet Village" m. Les Baxter
- "Running Bear" w.m. J. P. Richardson
- "The Same Old Me" F. Owen
- "Sea Of Love" w.m. George Khoury & Phil Baptiste
- "See You in September" w. Sid Wayne m. Sherman Edwards
- "Seven Little Girls Sitting in the Backseat" w. Bob Hilliard m. Lee Pockriss
- "Shout" O'Kelly Isley, Ronald Isley, Rudolph Isley
- "Side Saddle" m. Trevor H. Stanford
- "Sleep Walk" m. Ann Farina, Johnny Farina & Santo Farina
- "Small World" w. Stephen Sondheim m. Jule Styne. Introduced by Ethel Merman and Jack Klugman in the musical Gypsy
- "Sorry (I Ran All the Way Home)" w.m. Harry Giosasi & Artie Zwirn
- "The Sound Of Music" w. Oscar Hammerstein II m. Richard Rodgers. Introduced by Mary Martin in the musical Sound of Music.
- "Strange Are The Ways Of Love" w. Ned Washington m. Dimitri Tiomkin, from the film western The Young Land
- "Summertime Love" w.m. Frank Loesser
- "Sweet Nothin's" Ronnie Self
- "Take Me Along" w.m. Bob Merrill. Introduced by Jackie Gleason and Walter Pidgeon in the musical Take Me Along.
- "Tall Paul" w.m. Bob Roberts, Bob Sherman & Dick Sherman
- "Tallahassee Lassie" w.m. Frank C. Slay Jr, Bob Crewe & Frederick A. Picariello
- "Teen Angel" w.m. Jean Surrey & Red Surrey
- "A Teenager in Love" w.m. Jerome "Doc" Pomus & Mort Shuman
- "There Goes My Baby" w.m. Benjamin Nelson, Lover Patterson, George Treadwell
- "This Magic Moment" w.m. Doc Pomus & Mort Shuman
- "Three Steps to Heaven" Eddie Cochran
- "The Tijuana Jail" w.m. Denny Thompson
- " ('Til) I Kissed You" w.m. Don Everly
- "Time And The River" w.m. Aaron Schroeder & Wally Gold
- "Too Long At The Fair" w.m. Billy Barnes
- "The Untouchables" m. Nelson Riddle.
- "Venus" w.m. Ed Marshall
- "The Village of St. Bernadette" w.m. Eula Parker
- "Waterloo" w.m. John D. Loudermilk & Marijohn Wilkin
- "We Got Love" w. Kal Mann m. Bernie Lowe
- "What Do You Want?" Les Vandyke
- "What'd I Say" w.m. Ray Charles
- "Why" w. Bob Marcucci m. Peter De Angelis
- "The Wonder of You" w.m. Baker Knight
- "A Worried Man" w.m. Dave Guard & Tom Glazer
- "You're Starting To Get To Me" Sammy Cahn, Jimmy Van Heusen, from the film Say One for Me

== Other notable songs ==
- "Chiclete com banana" w.m. Gordurinha and Almira Castilho
- "Jin-go-lo-ba" w.m. Babatunde Olatunji
- "Ne me quitte pas" w. m. Jacques Brel
- "Piove (Ciao, ciao bambina)" w. Dino Verde m. Domenico Modugno
- "Satchan" w. Hiroo Sakata m. Megumi Ōnaka

== Classical music ==
=== Premieres ===
Sortable table
Composer	Composition	Date	Location	Performers
Berio, Luciano	String Quartet No. 1	1959-05-12	Vienna	Quartett Die Reihe
Lilburn, Douglas	Symphony No. 2	1959-06-??	Wellington, New Zealand, Town Hall	New Zealand Symphony – Hopkins
Prokofiev, Sergei	Sonata for Solo Violin (1947)	1959-07-10	Moscow, Russia	Ricci
John Serry	American Rhapsody	1959-06-22	New York City, New York	John Serry
Stockhausen, Karlheinz	Refrain	1959-10-02	Berlin (Festwochen)	Tudor, Cardew, Rockstroh
Stockhausen, Karlheinz	Zyklus	1959-08-25	Darmstadt, Germany (Ferienkurse)	Caskel

=== Compositions ===
- Juhan Aavik – Requiem
- Jean Absil –
  - Danses bulgares, op. 103, for piano
  - Passacaglia in memoriam Alban Berg, op. 101, for piano
  - Rhapsody No. 5, op. 102, for 2 pianos
- Murray Adaskin – Saskatchewan Legend, for orchestra
- Samuel Adler – Toccata, Recitation, and Postlude, for organ
- Stephen Albert – Toccatas (2), for piano
- William Alwyn –
  - Symphony No. 4
  - Trio for strings
- Hendrik Andriessen –
  - Missa populi, for solo voice, congregation, and organ
  - Signum Magnum, for soprano, choir, and organ
  - Suite, for flute or recorder and piano
  - Tota pulchra, anima mea, for 2 voices and organ
- Jurriaan Andriessen – Sonata da camera, for flute, viola, and guitar
- Louis Andriessen –
  - Nocturnen, for soprano and chamber orchestra
  - Percosse, for flute, trumpet, bassoon, and percussion
- István Anhalt –
  - Electronic Composition No. 1 "Sine nomine I"
  - Electronic Composition No. 2 "Sine nomine II"
- Hans Erich Apostel –
  - Fantasie, op. 31b, for piano
  - Österreichische Miniaturen (5), for orchestra
  - Vier kleine Klavierstücke, op. 31a, for piano
- Malcolm Arnold –
  - Concerto, for guitar and chamber orchestra, op. 67
  - Song of Simeon, op. 69 (nativity masque), for mimes, solo voices, and chamber orchestra
  - Sweeney Todd, op. 68 (ballet)
  - William Blake Songs, op. 66, for alto and strings
- Claude Arrieu –
  - Fantaisie lyrique, for ondes martenot and piano
  - Suite, for string orchestra
- Robert Ashley – Piano Sonata ("Christopher Columbus crosses to the New World in the Niña, the Pinta and the Santa Maria using only dead reckoning and a crude astrolabe")
- Larry Austin – Homecoming, cantata for soprano and jazz quintet
- Jan Bach – Toccata, for orchestra
- Sven-Erik Bäck – A Game around a Game, for orchestra
- Henk Badings –
  - Capriccio, for violin, 2 tapes, and "elektromagnetische Klangfiguren"
  - Die Frau von Andros, ballet, electronic music
  - Jungle, ballet, electronic music
  - Languentibus in purgatorio, for mixed choir
  - Psalm 147, for children's chorus, chamber chorus, chorus, and orchestra
- Claude Baillif – Mouvements pour deux, op. 27, for flute and piano
- Tadeusz Baird – Espressioni varianti, for violin and orchestra
- Leonardo Balada – Musica en cuatro tiempos, for piano
- Samuel Barber – Nocturne (Homage to John Field), op. 33, for piano
- Jean Barraqué – ... Au delà du hasard, for SSA soloists, 20 instruments in 4 groups including piano and clarinet soloists
- Leslie Bassett –
  - Duets, for 2 cellos
  - For City, Nation, World. cantata, for tenor, SATB choir, children's choir ad lib, congregation, 4 trombones, and organ
  - Sonata, for violin and piano
- Jürg Baur –
  - Chorale Preludes (4), for organ
  - Concertino, for flute, oboe, clarinet, string orchestra, and timpani
  - Metamorphosen, for piano, violin, and cello
- Gustavo Becerra-Schmidt – String Quartet No. 5
- John J. Becker –
  - At Dieppe, for voice and piano
  - String Quartet no. 3 (unfinished)
- John Beckwith – Music for Dancing, for orchestra (second orchestration)
- Jack Beeson –
  - Against Idleness and Mischief and in Praise of Labor, for high voice and piano
  - "Fire, Fire, Quench Desire", for high voice and piano
  - Lullaby, for alto and piano (revised version)
  - Round and Round, for piano, four-hands
  - Symphony No. 1, in A major
  - Three Love Songs, for alto and piano (revised version)
  - Transformations, for large orchestra
- Paul Ben-Haim –
  - Hazono shel navi [The Vision of a Prophet], for tenor, SATB choir, and orchestra
  - Poème, for harp
- Arthur Benjamin – String Quartet No. 2
- Richard Rodney Bennett – Music for an Occasion, for orchestra
- Niels Viggo Bentzon – Piano Sonata No. 7, op. 121
- Gunnar Berg –
  - Gaffkys I–X, for piano
  - Pour clarinette et violon, for clarinet and violin
  - Pour piano et orchestre, for piano and orchestra
  - 37 Aspects (Spoon River) , for ensemble
- Arthur Berger – Chamber Concerto, for small orchestra
- Luciano Berio –
  - Allez Hop!, "racconto mimico"
  - Différences (1958–59), for ensemble and tape
  - Quaderni I, for orchestra
  - Thema (Omaggio a Joyce) (1958–59) for voice and tape
- Lennox Berkeley –
  - Overture, for light orchestra
  - "So sweet love seemed", for mezzo-sopran or baritone and piano
  - Sonatina, op. 52, no. 2, for 2 pianos
- Boris Blacher – Musica giocosa, op. 59, for orchestra
- Easley Blackwood Jr. –
  - Concertino, op. 5, for 5 instruments
  - String Quartet No. 2, op. 6
- Arthur Bliss – Birthday Song for a Royal Child, SATB choir
- Augustyn Bloch –
  - Espressioni, for soprano and orchestra
  - Impressioni poetiche, for male choir and orchestra
- Konrad Boehmer – Variation, for orchestra
- William Bolcom – Romantic Pieces, for piano
- Margaret Bonds –
  - Dream Portraits (3), for voice and piano
  - "Ezekiel saw the wheel", for voice and piano
  - "I Got a Home in That Rock", for voice and orchestra or piano
  - Mass in D Minor, for choir and organ
- Narcís Bonet – Choral, for organ
- Pierre Boulez –
  - Improvisation sur Mallarmé III: A la nue accablante tu, for soprano and orchestra
  - Tombeau, for soprano and orchestra
- Paul Bowles – Sweet Bird of Youth, incidental music for the play by Tennessee Williams
- Henry Brant – The Crossing, for tenor, oboe or soprano saxophone, glockenspiel, violin, and cello
- Havergal Brian – Symphony No. 13 in C major
- Benjamin Britten –
  - Cantata academica, carmen basiliense, op. 62, for SATB chorus and orchestra
  - Fanfare for St Edmundsbury, for 3 trumpets
  - Missa brevis in D, op. 63, for boys’ voices and organ
  - Oliver Cromwell, for unison voices and piano
- Earle Brown – Hodograph I, for flute, piano + celesta, and percussion
- Alan Bush – Dorian Passacaglia and Fugue, op. 52, for orchestra
- Geoffrey Bush – Songs of Wonder, for soprano or tenor and string orchestra or piano
- Sylvano Bussotti – Piano Pieces for David Tudor
- Nigel Butterley – Joseph and Mary, for soprano and flute
- Cornelius Cardew – Piano Piece 1959
- Elliott Carter – String Quartet No. 2
- Niccolo Castiglioni – Cangiati, for piano
- Chen Gang & He Zhanhao – Butterfly Lovers' Violin Concerto
- Aldo Clementi –
  - Ideogrammi No. 1, for 16 instruments
  - Ideogrammi No. 2, for flute and 17 instruments
- Aaron Copland –
  - Dance Panels, for orchestra
  - Paisaje mexicana and Danza de Jalisco, as Two Mexican Pieces, for orchestra; later became part of Three Latin American Sketches (1971)
- John Corigliano –
  - Kaleidoscope, for 2 pianos
  - Petits Fours, for violin and piano
- Paul Creston –
  - Janus, op. 77, for orchestra
  - Prelude and Dance, op. 76, for band
- George Crumb – Variazioni for large orchestra
  - Halim El-Dabh –
  - Elements, Beings and Primevals, for tape
  - Juxtaposition No. 1, for percussion ensemble
  - Juxtaposition No. 2, for percussion and harp
  - Juxtaposition No. 3, for mezzo-soprano, 2 harps, and percussion
  - Leiyla and the Poet, for tape
  - Meditation on White Noise, for tape
  - The Word, for tape,
- Mario Davidovsky – Serie sinfonica 1959 for orchestra
- Peter Maxwell Davies –
  - Ricercar and Doubles (on "To Many a Well"), for ensemble, Op. 10
  - Richard II, incidental music to Shakespeare's play, WoO 51
- Paul Dessau –
  - Flug zur Sonne, dance scenes
  - Hymne auf den Beginn einer neuen Geschichte der Menschheit, for speaker, soprano, chorus, 3 pianos, 2 harps, double bass, timpani, and percussion
- David Diamond –
  - A Private World, for piano
  - Sonata, for solo cello
  - Sonata, for solo violin
  - Symphony No. 7
- John Downey – Eastlake Terrace, for piano
- Henri Dutilleux – Symphony No. 2 (Le Double)
- Werner Egk –
  - Furchtlosigkeit und Wohlwollen, oratorio for tenor, mixed chorus, and orchestra (revised version)
  - Variationen über ein karibisches Thema, for orchestra
- Gottfried von Einem – Tanz-Rondo, op. 27, for orchestra
- Hanns Eisler –
  - Brandverse, for voice and piano
  - Motto (Auf einer chinesischen Theewurzellöwen), for voice and piano
  - Musik zu ‘Schweyk im zweiten Weltkrieg’, for voice and small orchestra
  - Trommellied, for voice and piano
  - Rezitativ und Fuge auf 60. Geburtstag von J. R. Becher, for voice and piano
  - Um meine Weisheit unbekümmert, for voice and piano
- Nicolas Flagello –
  - Concerto for strings, Op. 27
  - Tristis est anima mea, for SATB choir and orchestra, Op. 29
- Kenneth Gaburo – Stray Birds, for soprano and piano
- Roberto Gerhard –
  - Asylum Diary, incidental music for the play by Lavant
  - Chaconne, for solo violin
  - Coriolanus, incidental music for the play by Shakespeare
  - Don Carlos, incidental music for the play by Schiller
  - Lament on the Death of a Bullfighter, for speaker and tape
- Ottmar Gerster –
  - Concerto, for horn and orchestra
  - Vorwärts!, for baritone, speaker, SATB choir, and chamber orchestra
- Peggy Glanville-Hicks –
  - Drama for Orchestra, for clarinet, trumpet, piano, 3 percussionists, strings
  - Saul and the Witch of Endor, ballet for television
- Roger Goeb –
  - Concertino no. 2, for orchestra
  - Iowa Concerto, for chamber orchestra
- Alexander Goehr –
  - Fantasia, op. 4 (revised version), for orchestra
  - Songs from the Japanese, op. 9, for mezzo-soprano and piano or orchestra
  - Variations, op. 8, for flute and piano
- Henryk Górecki – Symphony No. 1 1959
- Fernando Lopes Graça –
  - Canções populares portuguesas (24), book 4, for voice and piano
  - História trágico-marítima, second version, for baritone, alto chorus, and orchestra
  - A menina do mar, for chamber orchestra
  - Nocturnos (5), for piano
  - As predicações de Adamastor contra os portugueses, for voice and piano
  - Prelúdio e dança burlesca, for 2 pianos
  - Rondes et complaintes des provinces de France, for choir
  - Tres peças, for violin and piano
  - Tres velhos fandangos portugueses, version for piano
- Camargo Guarnieri –
  - "O amor de agora", for voice and piano
  - "Onde andará", for voice and piano
  - Ponteios, volume 5, for piano
  - Sonata No. 5, for violin and piano
  - Valsa No. 10, for piano
- Cristóbal Halffter –
  - Sonata, for violin solo
  - Three Pieces, for flute solo
- Rodolfo Halffter – Tripartita, op. 25, for orchestra
- Iain Hamilton –
  - Sinfonia, for two orchestras
  - Sonata for cello and piano
- Karl Amadeus Hartmann – Concerto funebre for violin and strings (1939, revised 1959)
- Roman Haubenstock-Ramati – Interpolation: Mobile pour flûte
- Bernhard Heiden – Viola Sonata
- Hans Werner Henze –
  - Sonata for piano
  - L’usignolo dell’imperatore, balletto-pantomima, after Hans Christian Andersen
- Paul Hindemith –
  - Festmarsch, for 3 male voices and tuba
  - Joseph, lieber Joseph mein, canon for 4 voices
  - Six songs from Das Marienleben, op. 27, arranged for soprano and orchestra
- Alan Hovhaness –
  - Bardo Sonata, op. 192, for piano
  - Concerto for Accordion and Orchestra, op. 174
  - Lake of Van Sonata, op. 175, for piano (revised version)
  - Symphony No. 6 "Celestial Gate", op. 173, for chamber orchestra
  - Symphony No. 7 "Nanga Parvat", op. 175, for wind ensemble
- Andrew Imbrie – Legend, for orchestra
- Maki Ishii – Prelude and Variations, for flute, clarinet, bassoon, horn, violin, viola, cello, piano, and percussion
- Jānis Ivanovs – Piano Concerto in G minor
- Francis Jackson – Diversion for Mixtures
- Miloslav Kabeláč –
  - Cizokrajné motivy [Motifs from Foreign Countries], op. 38, for piano
  - Suite from Master of Nine Songs’, op. 34a, for baritone and orchestra
  - Suite, op. 39, for saxophone and piano
- Dmitri Kabalevsky –
  - Preludes and Fugues, op. 61
  - The Leninists, cantata after Y. Dolmatovski for three choruses and large symphony orchestra, op. 63
- Mauricio Kagel – Transición II, for piano, percussion, and two tape recorders
- Aram Khachaturian –
  - Lermontov: Suite, for orchestra
  - Sonatina, for piano
- Tikhon Khrennikov – Violin Concerto No. 1, op. 14
- Gottfried Michael Koenig –
  - Quintet for Winds, for flute, oboe, cor anglais, clarinet, and bassoon
  - String Quartet 1959
- Ernst Krenek –
  - Flötenstück neunphasig, op. 171, for flute and 6 pianos
  - Hausmusik, op. 172, for various instruments
  - Quaestio temporis, op. 170, for small orchestra
  - Six Motets, op. 169, for 4 voices
- György Kurtág –
  - String Quartet No. 1, op. 1
  - Wind Quintet, op. 2
- John La Montaine – Fragments from the Song of Songs, op. 29, for soprano and orchestra
- Ingvar Lidholm – Mutanza, for orchestra
- György Ligeti – Apparitions, for orchestra (1958–59)
- Otto Luening – Fantasia, for string quartet and orchestra
- Witold Lutosławski –
  - Dance Preludes, version for 9 instruments
  - Piosenki dziecinne (3), for voice and piano
- Elizabeth Maconchy – A Hymn to God the Father, for tenor and piano
- Bruno Maderna –
  - L’altro mondo, ovvero Gli stati e imperi della luna, music for a radio play by A. Brissoni, after Jonathan Swift's Gulliver's Travels
  - Piano Concerto
- Donald Martino – Trio, for violin, clarinet, and piano
- Bohuslav Martinů –
  - The Burden of Moab, cantata, for male voices and piano
  - Impromptus (2), for harpsichord
  - Madrigaly, for mixed voices
  - Mikeš z hor, chamber cantata, for solo voices, chorus, 2 violins, viola, and piano
  - Musique de chambre no. 1, for clarinet, violin, viola, cello, harp, and piano
  - Nonet, for flute, oboe, clarinet, bassoon, horn, violin, viola, cello, and double bass
  - Pièce, for 2 cellos
  - Písničky pro dětský sbor, for children’s choir
  - The Prophecy of Isaiah, cantata, for solo voices, male chorus, trumpet, viola, piano, and timpani
  - Ptačí hody, for children’s voices and trumpet
  - Variations on a Slovak Folksong, for cello and piano
  - Vigilie, for organ
  - Znělka, for children’s voices
- Yoritsune Matsudaira –
  - Danse sacrée et Danse finale, for orchestra
  - Katsura, for soprano, flute, guitar, harp, harpsichord, and percussion
- Toshirō Mayuzumi –
  - Campanology, electronic music
  - Sange, for male choir
  - Shukukon-ka [Wedding Song], for chorus and orchestra
  - U so ri, oratorio
- Peter Mennin – Sonata concertante, for violin and piano
- Darius Milhaud –
  - Burma Road, op. 375, incidental music for television
  - Mother Courage, op. 379, incidental music for the play by Bertolt Brecht
  - Sonatina, op. 378, for viola and piano
  - Symphonie concertante, op. 376, for bassoon, horn, trumpet, double bass, and orchestra
  - Symphony No. 9, op. 380
- Federico Mompou – Impressiones intimas, for piano (revised version)
- Makoto Moroi –
  - Chamber Cantata No. 2
  - Pitagoras no hoshi [Stars of Pythagoras], music drama, for solo voice, instruments, and tape
- Thea Musgrave –
  - Scottish Dance Suite, for orchestra
  - Triptych, for tenor and orchestra
- Bo Nilsson –
  - Ett blocks timme, cantata for soprano and chamber orchestra
  - Stenogram, for organ
  - Brief an Gösta Oswald, cantata trilogy
    - Ein irrender Sohn, for alto, alto flute, and chamber ensemble
    - Mädchentotenlieder, for soprano, alto flute, and chamber ensemble
    - Und die Zeiger seiner Augen wurden langsam zurückgedreht, for alto or soprano and orchestra
- Luigi Nono – Composizione no. 2 (Diario polacco ‘58), for orchestra
- Andrzej Panufnik –
  - Pieśni ludowych (5) unison choir, 2 flutes, 2 clarinets, and bass clarinet (revised version)
  - Polonia, suite for orchestra
- Arvo Pärt –
  - Meie aed, op. 3, for children’s chorus and orchestra
  - Sonatine, op. 1, no. 2, for piano
- Oedoen Partos
  - Improvisation and Niggun for harp
  - Maqamat, for flute and strings
- Vincent Persichetti –
  - Song of Peace, op. 82, for TTBB/SATB choir and piano
  - String Quartet No. 3, op. 81
- Michel Philippot – Composition No. 1, for string orchestra
- Walter Piston –
  - Concerto, for 2 pianos and orchestra
  - Three New England Sketches, for orchestra
- Quincy Porter –
  - Concerto for harpsichord and orchestra
  - Concerto (Concertino), for wind orchestra
- Francis Poulenc -
  - Gloria
- Henri Pousseur –
  - Préhistoire du cinéma, 1–track tape
  - Rimes pour différentes sources sonores, for 3 orchestral groups and 2-track tape
- Juan Orrego-Salas –
  - Alabanzas a la Virgen, op. 49, for soprano or tenor and piano
  - Garden Songs, op. 47, for soprano, flute, viola, and harp
- George Perle – Wind Quintet No. 1
- Allan Pettersson – Symphony No. 4 (1958–59)
- H. Owen Reed –
  - Che-Ba-Kun-Ah (Road of Souls), for band, or for winds and string quartet
  - Renascence, for band
- George Rochberg – Bartókiana, for piano
- Ned Rorem –
  - "Memory", for voice and piano
  - Miracles of Christmas, for SATB choir and organ
  - "My Papa's Waltz", for voice and piano
  - "Night Crow", for voice and piano
  - "Root Cellar", for voice and piano
  - Two Poems of Theodore Roethke, for voice and piano
  - "The Waking", for voice and piano
- Hilding Rosenberg –
  - Glaukes sånger (revised version), for voice and piano
  - Quintet for winds
  - Riflessioni No. 1, for string orchestra
  - Sonata, for solo flute
  - Songs (4), for voice and piano
- Frederic Rzewski – Poem, for piano
- Vadim Salmanov – Symphony No. 2 in G
- Domingo Santa Cruz – String Quartet No. 3, op. 31
- Giacinto Scelsi – Quattro pezzi su una nota sola ["Four pieces each on a single note"]
- Bogusław Schaeffer – Concerto breve for cello
- Pierre Schaeffer – Etudes aux objets
- R. Murray Schafer – In memoriam: Alberto Guerrero, for string orchestra
- Hermann Schroeder –
  - Missa figuralis, for choir, instruments, and organ
  - Partita Veni Creator Spiritus, for organ
  - Quartet No. 3, for oboe, violin, viola, and cello
- Gunther Schuller –
  - Abstraction, for nine instruments
  - Concertino, for jazz quartet and orchestra
  - Conversations, for jazz quartet and string quartet
- William Schuman – Violin Concerto (revised version)
- Makoto Shinohara –
  - Kassouga, for flute and piano
  - Pièces concertantes (3), for trumpet and piano
- Dmitri Shostakovich – Cello Concerto No. 1
- Karlheinz Stockhausen –
  - Refrain, for three players
  - Zyklus, for a percussionist
- Igor Stravinsky –
  - Double Canon: Raoul Dufy in memoriam, for four instruments
  - Epitaphium, "Für das Grabmal des Prinzen Max Egon zu Fürstenberg", for flute, clarinet, and harp
- Carlos Surinach – Concerto for Orchestra
- Tōru Takemitsu –
  - Ikari wo komete furikaereba [Looking Back with Rage], incidental music
  - Kaizoku [A Pirate], incidental music
  - Saegirarenai kyūsoku [Uninterrupted Rest] I–III, for piano
  - Scene, for cello and string orchestra
  - Shiseru ōjo [A Dead Princess], incidental music
- Randall Thompson –
  - Frostiana, for 3–7 voices and piano or orchestra
  - The Gate of Heaven, 4-part choir
- Virgil Thomson –
  - Bertha (incidental music for the play by K. Koch)
  - Collected Poems (K. Koch), for soprano, baritone, and orchestra
  - Fugues and Cantilenas for orchestra
  - Lamentations, for accordion
  - Mostly about Love (Four Songs for Alice Estey), for voice and piano
- Michael Tippett – Lullaby, for 6 solo voices: alto, two sopranos, two tenors, and bass
- Erich Urbanner – Concertino, for flute and orchestra
- Vladimir Ussachevsky –
  - The Boy Who Saw Through, film score
  - Studies in Sound, Plus, for tape
- David Van Vactor – Symphony No. 3
- Heitor Villa-Lobos –
  - Concerto Grosso, for wind quartet and wind ensemble
  - Suite No. 1, for chamber orchestra
  - Suite No. 2, for chamber orchestra
- William Walton –
  - Anon in Love, 6 songs for tenor and guitar or orchestra
  - March: A History of the English-speaking Peoples, incidental music for ABC TV
  - A Queen’s Fanfare, for brass
- Egon Wellesz –
  - Lieder aus Wien, op. 82, for voice and piano
  - Quintet, op.81 for clarinet and string quartet
  - Rhapsodie, op. 87, for viola
- Healey Willan –
  - Passacaglia and Fugue no. 2 in E minor, op. 178, for organ
  - Poem for Strings, op. 82, version for string orchestra
- Grace Williams – All Seasons Shall Be Sweet
- Charles Wuorinen –
  - Musica duarum partium ecclesiastica, for brass quintet, timpani, piano, and organ
  - Symphony No. 3
  - Trio concertante, for oboe, violin, and piano
- La Monte Young –
  - Sarabande, for any instruments
  - Studies I, II, and III, for piano
  - Vision, for piano, 2 brass, recorder, 4 bassoons, violin, viola, cello, and double bass
- Jōji Yuasa – Projection Topologic, for piano
- Iannis Xenakis –
  - Analogique B, for 2-track tape
  - Duel for Two Small Orchestras
  - Syrmos, for 12 violins, 3 cellos, and 3 double basses
- Çesk Zadeja – Atdheu im, cantata for tenor and mixed chorus

== Opera ==
- Samuel Adler – The Outcast of Poker Flat
- Jurriaan Andriessen – Kalchas
- Claude Arrieu – La cabine téléphonique (March 15, 1959, RTF)
- Henk Badings – Salto mortale (TV chamber opera), Nederlandse Televisie Sichting, June 19, 1959
- Samuel Barber – A Hand of Bridge
- Grażyna Bacewicz – Przygoda króla Artura
- Karl-Birger Blomdahl – Aniara
- Carlos Chávez – Love Propitiated October 28, 1959, Mexico City (revised version of Panfilo e Lauretta)
- Paul Dessau – Puntila
- Ferenc Farkas – Paradies der Schwiegersöhne
- Nicolas Flagello – The Judgment of St Francis, Op. 28 (composed; staged 1966, New York)
- Lukas Foss – Introductions and Goodbyes (a nine-minute opera, libretto by Gian Carlo Menotti)
- Peggy Glanville-Hicks – The Glittering Gate (New York, May 15, 1959)
- Jakov Gotovac – Stanac
- Alan Hovhaness – Blue Flame, op. 172
- Sven-Eric Johanson – Kunskapens vin
- Elizabeth Maconchy – The Sofa
- Carl Orff – Oedipus der Tyrann (Stuttgart, December 11, 1959)
- Francis Poulenc – La voix humaine

== Film ==
- Luiz Bonfá & Antônio Carlos Jobim - Black Orpheus
- Duke Ellington - Anatomy of a Murder
- Bernard Herrmann - Journey to the Center of the Earth
- Bernard Herrmann - North by Northwest
- Miklós Rózsa - Ben Hur
- Max Steiner - A Summer Place
- Dimitri TIomkin - Rio Bravo

== Musical theater ==
- Aladdin (Cole Porter) London production opened at the Coliseum on December 17.
- Destry Rides Again Broadway production opened at the Imperial Theatre on April 23 and ran for 472 performances
- Fings Ain't Wot They Used T'Be (Lionel Bart) Stratford production opened at the Theatre Royal on April 17 and ran for 63 performances
- Fiorello! Broadway production opened at the Broadhurst Theatre on November 23 and ran for 795 performances
- Gypsy (Jule Styne and Stephen Sondheim) Broadway production opened at The Broadway Theatre on May 21 and ran for 702 performances
- Juno (Marc Blitzstein) Broadway production opened at the Winter Garden Theatre, New York, March 9, 1959, and ran for 16 performances
- Little Mary Sunshine Off-Broadway production opened at the Orpheum Theatre on November 18 and ran for 1143 performances.
- Lock Up Your Daughters (Lionel Bart) London production opened at the Mermaid Theatre on May 28 and ran for 328 performances
- The Love Doctor London production opened at the Piccadilly Theatre on October 12 and ran for only 16 performances.
- On the Town Broadway revival opened at the Carnegie Hall Playhouse on January 15 and ran for 70 performances
- Once Upon a Mattress Broadway production opened at the St. James Theatre and ran for 244 performances
- Redhead Broadway production opened at the 46th Street Theatre on February 5 and ran for 405 performances
- The Sound of Music (Richard Rodgers and Oscar Hammerstein II) Broadway production opened at the Lunt-Fontanne Theatre on November 16 and ran for 1443 performances.
- Take Me Along Broadway production opened at the Shubert Theatre on October 22 and ran for 448 performances

== Musical films ==
- Expresso Bongo British film starring Laurence Harvey
- Char Dil Char Rahen, music by Anil Biswas, starring Raj Kapoor and Shammi Kapoor
- Dil Deke Dekho, music by Usha Khanna, starring Asha Parekh
- The Five Pennies starring Danny Kaye
- Go, Johnny, Go starring Jimmy Clanton and Sandy Stewart, and featuring Chuck Berry, Jackie Wilson, Ritchie Valens, The Cadillacs, Jo-Ann Campbell, The Flamingos and Eddie Cochran.
- Li'l Abner featuring most of the cast of the original Broadway production
- The Lady is a Square starring Anna Neagle, Frankie Vaughan, Janette Scott, Anthony Newley and Wilfrid Hyde-White
- Porgy And Bess, based on 1935 folk opera, directed by Otto Preminger, starring Sidney Poitier (singing voice dubbed by Robert McFerrin), Dorothy Dandridge (singing voice dubbed by Adele Addison) and Sammy Davis Jr.
- Say One for Me starring Bing Crosby and Debbie Reynolds
- Tommy the Toreador starring Tommy Steele
- Sleeping Beauty from Walt Disney Pictures (animated)

== Births ==
- January 2 – Cristina, no-wave singer (d. 2020)
- January 3 – Curt Bisquera, drummer
- January 4 – Vanity, Canadian-American singer-songwriter, dancer and actress (d. 2016)
- January 6 – Kathy Sledge, vocalist (Sister Sledge)
- January 7 – Kathy Valentine new wave musician (The Go-Go's)
- January 8 – Paul Hester, drummer (Crowded House) (d. 2005)
- January 10 – Curt Kirkwood, alternative rock singer-songwriter (Meat Puppets)
- January 12
  - Blixa Bargeld (Einstürzende Neubauten)
  - Per Gessle (Roxette)
- January 14
  - Chas Smash (Madness)
  - Geoff Tate (Queensrÿche)
- January 16 – Sade, singer
- January 17
  - Susanna Hoffs, singer (The Bangles)
  - Fabio Luisi, conductor
  - Momoe Yamaguchi, singer and actress
- January 21 – Duane Denison, guitarist (The Jesus Lizard and Tomahawk)
- January 28
  - Dave Sharp, English guitarist (The Alarm and The Hard Travelers)
  - Bill Ware, American vibraphone player
- January 30 – Jody Watley, singer
- February 3 – Lol Tolhurst, The Cure
- February 14 – Renée Fleming, operatic soprano
- February 15 – Ali Campbell, ska musician (UB40)
- February 25 – Mike Peters, rock singer-songwriter (The Alarm) (d. 2025)
- March 7 – Andy Diagram, British trumpet player
- March 15 – Peter Ablinger, Austrian composer and academic (d. 2025)
- March 16 – Flavor Flav, American rapper (Public Enemy)
- March 17 – Mike Lindup, English keyboard player and vocalist (Level 42)
- March 18 – Irene Cara, American singer-songwriter and film actress (d. 2022)
- March 19 – Terry Hall, British ska singer (The Specials) (d. 2022)
- March 21 – Nobuo Uematsu, Japanese video game composer
- March 27 – Andrew Farriss, Australian rock musician (INXS)
- March 29 – Perry Farrell, American alternative rock singer (Jane's Addiction)
- April 1 – Margita "Magi" Stefanović, Serbian keyboardist (d. 2002)
- April 10
  - Babyface, R&B musician and record producer
  - Brian Setzer, guitarist and singer (The Stray Cats)
- April 21
  - Jerry Only, American singer-songwriter and bass player (The Misfits, Osaka Popstar and Kryst the Conqueror)
  - Robert Smith, singer (The Cure)
  - Michael Timmins alternative country/folk rock songwriter and guitarist (Cowboy Junkies)
- April 27
  - Marco Pirroni, guitarist (Adam and the Ants, Siouxsie and the Banshees (founder member), The Models, The Wolfmen)
  - Sheena Easton, singer
- April 29 – Yasuhiro Kobayashi, Japanese musician, accordionist, composer and arranger
- May 3 – David Ball, Soft Cell
- May 4 – Randy Travis, country singer
- May 5 – Ian McCulloch, singer (Echo & the Bunnymen)
- May 20
  - Susan Cowsill, rock singer-songwriter (The Cowsills, Continental Drifters)
  - Gregory Gray, singer-songwriter (d. 2019)
- May 22 – Morrissey, singer-songwriter (The Smiths, solo)
- May 28 – Steve Strange, singer (Visage) (d. 2015)
- June 1 – Alan Wilder (Depeche Mode)
- June 11 – Kathinka Pasveer, flautist
- June 12 – John Linnell (They Might Be Giants)
- June 15 – Tor Endresen, Norwegian singer and composer
- June 19
  - Mark DeBarge (DeBarge)
  - Dennis Fuller, Jamaican born English singer (London Boys) (d. 1996)
- June 21
  - Marcella Detroit, American singer-songwriter and guitarist (Shakespear's Sister)
  - Kathy Mattea, American singer-songwriter and guitarist
- June 22 – Alan Anton (Cowboy Junkies)
- June 22 – Nicola Sirkis, French musician (Indochine_(band))
- June 24 – Andy McCluskey (Orchestral Manoeuvres in the Dark)
- June 28 – Clint Boon, English musician, DJ and radio presenter (Inspiral Carpets)
- June 29 – Buren Fowler, American guitarist (Drivin N Cryin) (d. 2014)
- July 1 – Edem Ephraim, English singer (London Boys) (d. 1996)
- July 3 – Stephen Pearcy, American heavy metal singer-songwriter (Ratt)
- July 5 – Marc Cohn, singer-songwriter
- July 9
  - Marc Almond, synthpop singer (Soft Cell)
  - Jim Kerr, singer (Simple Minds)
- July 11
  - Richie Sambora (Bon Jovi)
  - Suzanne Vega, American singer-songwriter, musician and record producer
- July 16 – James MacMillan, composer and conductor
- July 18 – Jonathan Dove, English operatic composer
- July 20 – Radney Foster, American singer-songwriter, guitarist and producer (Foster & Lloyd)
- July 28 – Chris Reece, drummer (Social Distortion)
- August 1 – Joe Elliott, English hard rock singer (Def Leppard)
- August 5 – Pat Smear (Foo Fighters)
- August 6 – Joyce Sims, American R&B singer-songwriter (d. 2022)
- August 6 – Donna Lewis, Welsh singer
- August 8 – Deborah Conway, singer/songwriter and guitarist
- August 9 – Kurtis Blow, rapper
- August 11 – Gustavo Cerati, Argentinian singer-songwriter, producer and guitarist (Soda Stereo)
- August 13 – Martyn Brabbins, English conductor
- August 23 – Edwyn Collins, Scottish musician and singer (Orange Juice)
- August 27 – Daniela Romo, Mexican singer, actress, and TV hostess
- August 29 – Eddi Reader, Scottish singer
- August 30 – Andreas Delfs, German conductor
- August 31 – Tony DeFranco, singer (The DeFranco Family)
- September 8 – Daler Nazarov, Tajik composer, singer and actor
- September 14 – Morten Harket, singer (a-ha)
- September 23 – Jason Alexander, American actor and comedian
- October 1 – Youssou N'Dour, Senegalese singer
- October 4 – Chris Lowe, keyboardist (Pet Shop Boys)
- October 7 – Simon Cowell, British record executive and judge on The X Factor and American Idol
- October 10 – Kirsty MacColl, English singer (d. 2000)
- October 13 – Marie Osmond, singer
- October 16
  - Gary Kemp (Spandau Ballet)
  - Erkki-Sven Tüür, composer
- October 21 – Cleveland Watkiss, jazz vocalist
- October 23 – "Weird Al" Yankovic, parodist, musician and singer
- October 25 – Christina Amphlett, Australian rock singer
- November 1 – Eddie MacDonald (The Alarm)
- November 5 – Bryan Adams, singer/guitarist
- November 27 – Charlie Burchill (Simple Minds)
- November 29 – Steve Hindalong, record producer
- December 4 – Bob Griffin (The BoDeans)
- December 24 – Sunwoo Eun-sook, South Korean actress
- December 26 – Chuck Mosley, singer (Faith No More) (d. 2017)
- December 30 – Tracey Ullman, comedian and singer
- December 31
  - Baron Waqa, Nauruan politician and composer
  - Paul Westerberg, singer, guitarist and songwriter (The Replacements)

== Deaths ==
- January 6 – José Enrique Pedreira, composer, 54
- February 3, in a plane crash (see Events)
  - Buddy Holly, singer, songwriter and guitarist, 22
  - Ritchie Valens, singer, songwriter and guitarist, 17
  - The Big Bopper, disc jockey, singer, and songwriter, 28
- February 12 – George Antheil, pianist and composer, 58 (heart attack)
- February 13 – William Axt, film composer, 70
- February 14 – Baby Dodds, jazz musician, 60
- February 18 – Erich Zeisl, composer, 53 (heart attack)
- February 28 – Maxwell Anderson, lyricist, 70
- March 1 – Mack Gordon, American songwriter, 54
- March 2 – Yrjö Kilpinen, Finnish composer, 67
- March 15 – Lester Young, American jazz musician, 49 (liver disease and malnutrition)
- March 25 – Billy Mayerl, English pianist and composer, 56 (heart attack)
- April 20 – Edward Johnson, operatic tenor, 80
- April 22 – Claire Delbos, French composer and violinist, 52
- May 14 – Sidney Bechet, jazz saxophonist, 62
- May 29 – Frank Marshall, pianist and teacher, 75
- June 9 – Sonnie Hale, English actor and singer, 57 (myelofibrosis)
- July 15 – Ernest Bloch, composer, 78
- July 17 – Billie Holiday, jazz and blues singer, 44 (liver and heart disease)
- August 7 – Armas Launis, Finnish composer and ethnomusicologist, 75
- August 15 – Blind Willie McTell, American blues singer, 61
- August 16 – Wanda Landowska, harpsichordist, 80
- August 17 – Pedro Humberto Allende, composer and ethnomusicologist, 74
- August 28 – Bohuslav Martinů, composer, 68
- September 1 – Jack Norworth, singer-songwriter, 80
- September 6 – Kay Kendall, musical comedy actress, 33 (leukaemia)
- September 8 – Mohammed El-Bakkar, Lebanese tenor, oud player and conductor, 46 (cerebral hemorrhage)
- September 11 – Ann Drummond-Grant, operatic contralto, 54
- September 17 – Omer Simeon, jazz clarinetist, 57 (throat cancer)
- September 21 – Agnes Nicholls, operatic soprano, 83
- September 22
  - Josef Matthias Hauer, composer, 76
  - Jane Winton, actress, dancer, operatic soprano, writer and painter, 53
- September 25 – Helen Broderick, Broadway star, 68
- September 28 – Gerard Hoffnung, artist, comedian and musician, 34 (cerebral haemorrhage)
- October 7 – Mario Lanza, operatic tenor, 38 (pulmonary embolism)
- October 28 – Egon Kornauth, Austrian composer and pianist, 68
- November 7 – Alberto Guerrero, pianist and composer, 73
- November 17 – Heitor Villa-Lobos, composer, 72
- November 22 – Sam M. Lewis, lyricist, 74
- November 26 – Albert Ketèlbey, composer, conductor and pianist, 84
- November 29 – Fritz Brun, Swiss composer and conductor, 81
- December 20 – Gilda Gray, dancer, 58 (heart attack)
- date unknown
  - Clotilde Arias, songwriter
  - Susan Metcalfe Casals, operatic mezzo-soprano

== Awards ==
=== Eurovision Song Contest ===
- Eurovision Song Contest 1959

=== Grammy Awards ===
- Grammy Awards of 1959

=== Pulitzer Prize for Music ===
- John La Montaine – Piano Concerto
