= At Large (album) =

The Kingston Trio at Large

Studio album by The Kingston Trio
- Released: June 1, 1959
- Recorded: 1959
- Studio: Capitol (Hollywood)
- Genre: Folk
- Length: 29:45
- Label: Capitol
- Producer: Voyle Gilmore

The Kingston Trio chronology
Stereo Concert (1959)	The Kingston Trio at Large (1959)	Here We Go Again! (1959)

Singles from The Kingston Trio At Large
- 1. "M.T.A."/"All My Sorrows" Released: 1959

The Kingston Trio at Large is the American folk music group the Kingston Trio's fourth album, released in 1959 (see 1959 in music). It was the Trio's first stereo studio album and one of the four they would simultaneously have on Billboard's Top 10 albums during that year. It spent fifteen weeks at #1. The single "M. T. A." b/w "All My Sorrows" spent eleven weeks on the singles charts and peaked at number 15. The Trio's second single that same year, "The Tijuana Jail" b/w "Oh Cindy", was recorded during The Kingston Trio at Large sessions. It peaked at number 12.

== History ==
Following the huge success of The Kingston Trio at Large coming after the success of The Kingston Trio, ...from the Hungry i and "Tom Dooley", Life magazine featured the Trio on their August 3, 1959, cover. In polls in both Billboard and Cash Box they were voted "The Best Group of the Year for 1959" by the nation's disc jockeys.

The Kingston Trio at Large was the first Trio studio album with David "Buck" Wheat on double bass and occasional guitar. Wheat also assisted with arrangements and would remain with the trio until the end of 1961.

"Remember the Alamo" was written by Jane Bowers and was presented to John Wayne for possible inclusion in the soundtrack for his movie epic, The Alamo. It was ultimately passed over for "The Green Leaves of Summer" by The Brothers Four. It was later recorded by Johnny Cash.

At the Grammy Awards of 1960 The Kingston Trio at Large won the first Grammy Award for Best Ethnic or Traditional Folk Recording. It was also nominated in the "Best Vocal Group or Chorus" category. An RIAA gold album award was presented on January 19, 1961. Only the 1962 compilation album The Best of the Kingston Trio has sold more copies than The Kingston Trio at Large.

== Reception ==
Professional ratings
Review scores
Source	Rating
Allmusic	3/5 stars
Allmusic	3/5 stars

In reviewing The Kingston Trio at Large for Allmusic, music critic Bruce Eder wrote the album "shows in the far more complex sound achieved by the trio throughout this album, with voices and instruments more closely interwoven than on their earlier studio recordings and achieving control over their volume that, even today, seems astonishing." He specifically praised Guard's banjo playing, writing it "shines throughout this album, and it was beginning here that Guard was to exert a separate influence on a whole generation of aspiring folk musicians and even one rock star (Lindsey Buckingham) with his banjo."

Music critic Ronnie D. Lankford, Jr. reviewed the Capitol reissue and wrote "Vocally, the group also began to sweeten its harmony... While some argue about the worth of these changes, many consider The Kingston Trio at Large to be the band's finest effort. The Kingston Trio at Large and Here We Go Again! capture the Kingston Trio early in their career, grounded in the success of their first albums and searching for new directions. Fans, folk revival enthusiasts, and the curious will enjoy this one."

== Reissues ==
- The Kingston Trio at Large was reissued in 1992 on CD by Capitol with Here We Go Again!.
- In 1997, all of the tracks from The Kingston Trio at Large were included in The Guard Years 10-CD box set issued by Bear Family Records.
- The Kingston Trio at Large was reissued in 2001 by Collector's Choice with Here We Go Again!. This reissue has three bonus tracks: an alternate version of "A Worried Man" and the non-LP single "The Tijuana Jail" backed with "Oh Cindy."
- The Kingston Trio at Large was reissued by Capitol as Scarlet Ribbons (SF-515) minus two tracks—"The Seine" and "Long Black Rifle".

== Track listing ==
=== Side one ===
1. "M.T.A." (Bess Lomax Hawes, Jacqueline Steiner) - 3:16
2. "All My Sorrows" (Arranged by Dave Guard, Nick Reynolds, Bob Shane) - 2:48
3. "Blow Ye Winds" (Traditional, Guard) - 2:00
4. "Corey, Corey" (Traditional, Guard, Reynolds, Shane) - 2:07
5. "The Seine" (Irving Burgess) - 2:41
6. "I Bawled" (Traditional, Shane) - 1:51

=== Side two ===
1. "Good News" (Lou Gottlieb) - 2:00
2. "Getaway John" (Traditional, Guard) - 2:35
3. "The Long Black Rifle" (Lawrence Coleman, Norman Gimbel) - 3:05
4. "Early in the Morning" (Randy Starr, Dick Wolf) - 2:04
5. "Scarlet Ribbons" (Evelyn Danzig, Jack Segal) - 2:17
6. "Remember the Alamo" (Jane Bowers) - 3:01

== Personnel ==
- Dave Guard – vocals, banjo, guitar
- Bob Shane – vocals, guitar
- Nick Reynolds – vocals, tenor guitar, bongos
- David "Buck" Wheat – bass

== Chart positions ==
Weekly chart performance for At Large
Chart (1959)	Peak position
Billboard Best Selling Monophonic LP'S	1
Billboard Best Selling Stereophonic LP'S	10
