= Here We Go Again! (album) =

Studio album by The Kingston Trio
- Released: October 19, 1959
- Recorded: May 26–27, June 1–2, 1959
- Studio: Capitol Studio B (Hollywood)
- Genre: Folk
- Label: Capitol
- Producer: Voyle Gilmore

The Kingston Trio chronology
At Large (1959)	Here We Go Again! (1959)	Sold Out (1960)

Singles from Here We Go Again!
- 1. "A Worried Man"/"San Miguel" Released: 1960

Here We Go Again! is an album by American folk music group the Kingston Trio, released in 1959 (see 1959 in music). It was one of the four the Trio would have simultaneously in Billboard's Top 10 albums during the year. It spent eight weeks at #1 and received an RIAA gold certification the same day as At Large. "A Worried Man" b/w "San Miguel" was its lead-off single, though it just made the Top 20. In November, two non-album songs were released as a single—"Coo Coo-U" b/w "Green Grasses"—but did not chart.

== Background ==
The trio worked with the assistance of Lou Gottlieb on the song selection and the arrangements. Rehearsals were done at the Cocoanut Grove club where the group was appearing at the time. "Molly Dee" was written by John Stewart who would eventually become a member of the Trio, replacing Dave Guard. "Across the Wide Missouri" is the Trio's version of the popular American folk song "Oh Shenandoah". Although credited to Dave Guard, “Goober Peas” dates from the Confederate South and “A Worried Man” (”Worried Man Blues”) is a song first recorded by The Carter Family in the 1930s and Woody Guthrie in the 1940s. "Haul Away" was originally credited to Jack Splittard, a pseudonym the trio members used to split copyright and royalties on public domain songs.

Ben Blake states in the 1992 reissue liner notes: "Here We Go Again! was reportedly the first Kingston Trio album on which Voyle Gilmore utilized what was called 'double-voicing' whenever all three group members sang in unison. This was accomplished by having them record their vocals twice; then Gilmore simply overdubbed one of the tracks. This gave the group a fuller sound. Recorded at Studio B in Los Angeles, Here We Go Again! also benefited from Capitol's Grand Canyon-like echo chamber, which Gilmore used to make the Trio's instruments 'ring' like no other folk group, before or since."

== Reception ==
Professional ratings
Review scores
Source	Rating
Allmusic	4/5 stars
Allmusic	3/5 stars

Sales of Here We Go Again! rose to over 900,000 copies reaching the number one chart position for eight weeks. At one point in 1959 after the release of Here We Go Again!, the Trio had four records at the same time among the Top 10 selling albums according to Billboard Magazine's "Top Ten Albums" chart for five consecutive weeks in November and December 1959, a record unmatched now for over 50 years. Here We Go Again! received Grammy nominations in the Folk category and the Vocal Group category.

In his retrospective review, Allmusic critic Matt Fink noted standout tracks in his review and called the release "a very well-rounded album." In his review of the 1992 reissue, critic Ronnie D. Lankford, Jr. wrote "At Large and Here We Go Again! capture the Kingston Trio early in their career, grounded in the success of their first albums and searching for new directions. Fans, folk revival enthusiasts, and the curious will enjoy this one."

== Reissues ==
- Here We Go Again! was reissued in 1992 on CD by Capitol with At Large.
- In 1997, all of the tracks from Here We Go Again! were included in The Guard Years 10-CD box set issued by Bear Family Records.
- Here We Go Again! was reissued in 2001 by Collector's Choice with At Large. This reissue has three bonus tracks: an alternative version of "A Worried Man" and the non-LP single "The Tijuana Jail" backed with "Oh Cindy."

== Track listing ==
=== Side one ===
1. "Molly Dee" (John Stewart)
2. "Across the Wide Missouri" (Ervin Drake, Jimmy Shirl)
3. "Haul Away" (Traditional)
4. "The Wanderer" (Irving Burgess)
5. "'Round About the Mountain" (Lou Gottlieb)
6. "Oleanna" (Harvey Geller, Martin Seligson)

=== Side two ===
1. "The Unfortunate Miss Bailey" (Traditional, Gottlieb)
2. "San Miguel" (Jane Bowers)
3. "E Inu Tatou E" (George Archer)
4. "A Rollin' Stone" (Stan Wilson)
5. "Goober Peas" (Dave Guard, Traditional)
6. "A Worried Man" (Traditional, Tom Glazer, Dave Guard)

== Personnel ==
- Dave Guard – vocals, banjo, guitar
- Bob Shane – vocals, guitar, banjo
- Nick Reynolds – vocals, tenor guitar, bongos
- David "Buck" Wheat – bass

== Production notes ==
- Produced by Voyle Gilmore
- Engineered by Peter Abbott
- Mixed by Voyle Gilmore and Rex Uptegraft

== Chart positions ==
Year	Chart	Position
1959	Billboard Pop Albums	1
