= Stereo Concert =

Live album by The Kingston Trio
- Released: March 16, 1959
- Recorded: December 15, 1958
- Venue: Liberty Hall, El Paso, Texas
- Genre: Folk
- Label: Capitol

The Kingston Trio chronology
...from the "Hungry i" (1959)	Stereo Concert (1959)	At Large (1959)

Alternative Cover
- Cover of the CD reissue: Stereo Concert Plus

Stereo Concert is the Kingston Trio's second live album, released in 1959 (see 1959 in music). It was never released in monaural—unusual for a record release in 1959.

The original release was issued with the same cover as the group's debut album The Kingston Trio. It was recorded live on December 15, 1958, Liberty Hall, El Paso, TX. Additional material on the expanded CD reissue actually was recorded at the hungry i in San Francisco. The liner notes do not acknowledge this.

The album was recorded by a private party and later purchased by Capitol for release.

== Reissues ==
- In 1997, all of the tracks from Stereo Concert were included in The Guard Years 10-CD box set issued by Bear Family Records.
- Stereo Concert was reissued in 1994 on CD by Folk Era Records as Stereo Concert Plus which was originally released on LP in 1986.

== Track listing ==
The original LP release had five songs per side. "Raspberries, Strawberries" and "The Merry Minuet" were not included on Stereo Concert Plus.

=== Side one ===
1. "Banua" (Traditional)
2. "Three Jolly Coachmen" (Traditional)
3. "South Coast" (Richard Dehr, Sam Eskin, Frank Miller, Lillian Ross)
4. "Coplas" (Dave Guard, Traditional)
5. "They Call the Wind Maria" (Alan Jay Lerner, Frederick Loewe)

=== Side two ===
1. "Zombie Jamboree" (Conrad Eugene Mauge Jr.)
2. "Tom Dooley" (Alan Lomax, Frank Warner)
3. "The Merry Minuet"
4. "Raspberries, Strawberries" (Will Holt)
5. "When the Saints Go Marching In" (Traditional)

== Stereo Concert Plus track listing ==
1. "Saro Jane" (Traditional)
2. "I Bawled" (Bob Shane)
3. "Banua" (Traditional)
4. "Three Jolly Coachmen" (Traditional)
5. "South Coast" (Richard Dehr, Sam Eskin, Frank Miller, Lillian Ross)
6. "Coplas" (Dave Guard, Traditional)
7. "They Call the Wind Maria" (Alan Jay Lerner, Frederick Loewe)
8. "Santy Anno" (Traditional)
9. "Pay Me My Money Down" (Traditional)
10. "Ruby Red" (Lee Pockriss, Paul Vance)
11. "Watsha" (Marion Roberts)
12. "Lei Pakalana" (Omar)
13. "Zombie Jamboree" (Mauge)
14. "Tom Dooley" (Alan Lomax, Frank Warner)
15. "Little Maggie" (Guard)
16. "Shady Grove/Lonesome Traveller" (Traditional)
17. "Bay of Mexico" (Traditional)
18. "Saints Go Marching In" (Traditional)

== Personnel ==
- Dave Guard – vocals, banjo, guitar
- Bob Shane – vocals, guitar
- Nick Reynolds – vocals, tenor guitar, bongos
- David "Buck" Wheat – bass

== Chart positions ==
Year	Chart	Position
1960	Billboard Pop Albums	15
