= The Last Month of the Year =

Studio album by The Kingston Trio
- Released: October 3, 1960
- Recorded: June 1960
- Studio: Capitol Studios, Hollywood, California
- Genre: Folk, Christmas
- Length: 27:28
- Label: Capitol
- Producer: Voyle Gilmore

The Kingston Trio chronology
String Along (1960)	The Last Month of the Year (1960)	Make Way (1961)

The Last Month of the Year is an album of Christmas music by the Kingston Trio, released in 1960 (see 1960 in music). It became the first Kingston Trio album release to fall below expected sales and Capitol withdrew the album from circulation shortly after its release.

== History ==
The Last Month of the Year is considered their most musically ambitious and also one of the Trio's least known. It was recorded in 1960 between shows at The Ambassador Hotel in Los Angeles.

Nick Reynolds stated in an interview for the liner notes of The Guard Years: "It wasn't your standard Christmas album. That's why we called it The Last Month of the Year. It was a pretty complicated little album, some very intricate stuff. Dave (Guard) brought in a lot of the arrangements with stuff like bouzouki instrumentation; Buckwheat (David Wheat, the Trio's bassist) played some wonderful gut-string guitar. We really worked hard on that one, laying down a lot of the instrumental tracks before we did the vocals, working on harmonies over and over. David (Guard) was responsible for a lot of that album, but we all brought things in... Musically, it came off very well; it just didn't sell."

== Reception ==
Professional ratings
Review scores
Source	Rating
Allmusic	4.5/5 stars

Sales for the album fell far below expected sales and Capitol withdrew the album from circulation shortly after its release.

In his Allmusic review, critic David A. Milberg called The Last Month of the Year "An essential part of any Christmas album collection, these are true Christmas folk songs, from spirituals to Old English rounds."

== Reissues ==
- The Last Month of the Year was reissued in 1991 on CD by Capitol, with eight other albums from the Dave Guard era.
- In 1997, all of the tracks from The Last Month of the Year were included in The Guard Years 10-CD box set issued by Bear Family Records.
- The album was reissued on CD again in 1999 by Collectors' Choice Music and once more in 2014 by Real Gone Music.

== Track listing ==
=== Side one ===
1. "Bye Bye Thou Little Tiny Child" (Dave Guard) – 2:35
2. "The White Snows of Winter" (Bob Shane, Tom Drake) – 2:34
3. "We Wish You a Merry Christmas" (Paul Campbell) – 1:34
4. "All Through the Night" (Nick Reynolds) – 2:44
5. "Goodnight My Baby" (Reynolds) – 1:54
6. "Go Where I Send Thee" (Dave Guard, Reynolds, Shane) – 2:31

=== Side two ===
1. "Follow Now, Oh Shepherds" (Gretchen Guard) – 2:49
2. "Somerset Gloucestershire Wassail" (Dave Guard, Eric Schwandt) – 1:47
3. "Mary Mild" (Miriam Stafford, Shane, Drake) – 2:50
4. "A Round About Christmas" (Reynolds) – 1:30
5. "Sing We Noel" (Dave Guard) – 2:03
6. "The Last Month of the Year (What Month Was Jesus Born In)" (Vera Hall, Ruby Pickens Tartt, Alan Lomax) – 2:37

== Personnel ==
- Dave Guard – vocals, banjo, guitar, bouzouki
- Bob Shane – vocals, guitar, banjo
- Nick Reynolds – vocals, tenor guitar, bongos
- David "Buck" Wheat – bass, guitar

== Production notes (1991 CD version) ==
- Produced by Voyle Gilmore
- Engineered by Pete Abbot
- Compilation produced and researched by Ron Furmanek
- Digitally remastered by Bob Norberg
- Remixed by Ron Furmanek and Bob Norberg

== Chart positions ==
Year	Chart	Position
1960	Billboard Pop Albums	11
