= David "Buck" Wheat =

American musician (1922–1985)

David Wheat
- Born: March 19, 1922; San Antonio, Texas, U.S.
- Died: June 15, 1985 (aged 63) Los Angeles, California, U.S.
- Genres: Folk, jazz, pop
- Occupation: Musician
- Instruments: Double bass, guitar
- Formerly of: The Kingston Trio, Whiskeyhill Singers

David "Buck" Wheat (March 19, 1922 – June 15, 1985) was an American folk and jazz musician. The Texas-born Wheat was a guitarist and bass player with the dance bands of the era, playing at the Chicago Playboy Jazz Festival 1959 in The Playboy Jazz All Stars and the Chet Baker Trio. In the winter of 1957, he was a jazz guitarist with Baker's Trio. Though most of Baker's material was recorded in Los Angeles, "Embraceable You", "There's a Lull in My Life" and "My Funny Valentine" are rare examples of Baker recording in New York. The format is also unusual for him, just Baker's vocals (no trumpet) accompanied by only Wheat on nylon string acoustic guitar and bassist Russ Savakus.

Wheat wrote music with his partner, lyricist Bill Loughborough. Their composition "Better Than Anything" is part of the live acts of Lena Horne, Phylicia Rashad, Irene Kral, Bob Dorough, Tuck and Patti and Al Jarreau. Their next song, "Coo Coo U", was recorded both by The Kingston Trio and by The Manhattan Transfer. Wheat embraced George Russell's Lydian Chromatic Concept of Tonal Organization for improvization; he would sing scales while playing a guitar accompaniment based on the theory.

== The Kingston Trio ==
Wheat was best known as the upright bass accompanist for The Kingston Trio, as the group's musicologist, and as the fourth member on stage an integral part of the music. He added a subtle jazz influence during the Trio's early recordings on the first eleven of the group's Capitol Records albums, including the critically acclaimed Here We Go Again!. He toured extensively, playing college campuses across America, coffee houses in Greenwich Village, and at the hungry i in San Francisco. He also appeared on many television shows of the time, among them Milton Berle's Texaco Star Theater, The Jack Benny Program, The Dinah Shore Chevy Show, The Pat Boone Show, and The Perry Como Show. Wheat appears on the cover of the Trio's Goin' Places album. When asked in an interview whether Buckwheat was considered a Beatnik since he grew up in the Beat Generation, Dave Guard answered of his mentor, "Not sure, but he knew where to get it" referring to marijuana.

== Whiskeyhill Singers ==
In 1961 Wheat left the Trio along with Dave Guard to form the Whiskeyhill Singers. The new group toured, recorded an album where along with Guard's banjo work on "Bonnie Ship, The Diamond", the group's rendition of the classic good-bye song "Isa Lei", using nothing but Buckwheat's bass for back-up, is reminiscent of his bass line and acoustic guitar behind Guard's soulful "Fast Freight," recorded with the Trio in 1958. The Whiskeyhill Singers also came to attention after their recording of traditional American folk songs for the soundtrack of the MGM Cinerama motion picture, How the West Was Won (1962).

== BooBam Bamboo Drum Company ==
Wheat had long been an advocate of George Russell's Lydian Chromatic Concept of Tonal Organization for improvization, the art of tonal gravity. In 1948 Harry Partch, an American composer, developed a microtonal system of music that depended on custom-built, specialized instruments of various and exotic designs, which could play non-tempered scales, for its performance. Buckwheat (the name Wheat used in later life) and his Sausalito, California roommate Bill Loughborough, a musician and electronic engineer, built instruments for Partch, such as a marimba played with a large soft mallet over the resonator, delivering barely audible, low-Hertz tones. Loughborough borrowed diagnostic and metric instruments from the Mare Island Navy Yard; using an oscilloscope and audio oscillator, they were able to work at a technical level not previously possible.

Together they moved onto a Sausalito barge with Jak Simpson, who in 1954 founded a business named the "Boobam Bamboo Drum Company". Wheat, who was also working on the President Lines cruises to the Orient as a bass player, would buy large-diameter giant bamboo in the Philippines and bring them back on the ship to build the South Pacific Island bamboo drums, which they manufactured in Mill Valley, California, as Boobam's, ('bam' and 'boo' switched around). The drums fascinated several jazz groups, which added them to their percussion sections. In 1956, Chet Baker's Ensemble used them to perform on the Today Show.

The drums' unique sound inspired Nick Reynolds of the Kingston Trio, who eagerly included BooBam on their tour, with Buckwheat's percussion solo being featured on O Ken Karanga, along with his last performance with the group on the album College Concert, the Trio's first live recording with John Stewart at UCLA in 1961. After the demise of the Whiskeyhill Singers, Wheat became the bassist/arranger for folk duo Bud & Travis. He is heard on two of their albums; In Person – Live at the Cellar Door and Perspective on Bud & Travis on the Liberty label.

== Discography ==
=== Chet Baker Ensemble ===
- Pretty/Groovy (World Pacific, 1957)
- Embraceable You (Pacific Jazz, 1957 [1995])
- My Funny Valentine 1954
- There's A Lull In My Life 1954 (Pacific Jazz)
- The Playboy Jazz All Stars, vol 3 1959 (Playboy)
- My Favorite Songs, Vol. 2: Straight from the Heart 1988 (Enja)
- Songs For Lovers 1997 (Pacific Jazz)
- Chet Baker Romance 1999 (Blue Note)
- Deep In A Dream 2002 (Pacific Jazz)
- Chet Baker Sextet (includes 1957 Bob Zieff session) (Pacific Jazz)
- Prince of Cool, The Pacific Jazz Years 2003 (Blue Note)
- The Very Best 2005 (Blue Note)
- Each Day Is Valentine's Day 2006 (Blue Note)
- Chet Baker Love Songs 2006 (Blue Note)

=== Jerome Richardson Quartet ===
- Midnight Oil (1958) Ojc
- Jerome Richardson Sextet (1958) Ojc

=== The Kingston Trio ===
- ...from the Hungry i 1959 (Capitol)
- Stereo Concert 1959 (Capitol)
- At Large 1959 (Capitol)
- Here We Go Again! 1959 (Capitol)
- Sold Out 1960 (Capitol)
- String Along 1960 (Capitol)
- The Last Month of the Year 1960 (Capitol)
- The Kingston Trio Sings for 7-UP 1960 (TV commercial)
- Make Way 1960 (Capitol)
- Goin' Places 1961 (Capitol)
- Close-Up 1961 (Capitol)
- College Concert 1961 (Capitol)
- Live at Newport 1994 (Capitol)
- The Capitol Years 1995 (Capitol)
- The Guard Years 1997
- Capitol Collector Series 1990 (Capitol)

=== The Whiskeyhill Singers ===
- Dave Guard & The Whiskeyhill Singers 1962 (Capitol)
- Whiskeyhill Singers 2nd Album 1962 (unreleased)
- Ride on Railroad Bill 1962 (Capitol)
- Plane Wreck at Los Gatos 1962 (Capitol)
- How The West Was Won: Original Motion Picture Soundtrack 1963 (MGM)

=== Bud & Travis ===
- Perspective on Bud & Travis 1963 (Liberty)
- Live at the Cellar Door 1964 (Liberty)

=== Top 40 hit singles ===
- The Tijuana Jail 1959 (Capitol) – #12
- M.T.A. 1959 (Capitol) – #15
- A Worried Man 1959 (Capitol) – #20
- El Matador 1960 (Capitol) – #32
- Bad Man Blunder 1960 (Capitol) – #37

=== Artists who have recorded his compositions ===
- Irene Kral Better Than Anything 1963
- Bob Dorough Just About Everything 1967
- Tuck & Patti Tears of Joy 1988
- Al Jarreau Look to the Rainbow 1997
- Tuck & Patti As Time Goes By 2001
- Natalie Cole with Diana Krall Ask A Woman Who Knows 2002
- Carla Cook Dem Bones 2004
- Nnenna Freelon Voices of Concord Jazz, Live at Montreux 2004
- Nnenna Freelon Soul Call 2006
- The Manhattan Transfer Extensions 1979

=== Singles ===
- Brady and Duncan (with Dave Guard, Judy Henske and Cyrus Faryar) – B.M.I.
- Better Than Anything (with Bill Loughborough) – B.M.I.
- Coo Coo-U (with Bill Loughborough) – B.M.I.
- Goin' to California (with Bill Loughborough) – B.M.I.
- Gotta Bet With Myself – B.M.I.
- Isa Lei (with Dave Guard, Judy Henske and Cyrus Faryar) – B.M.I.
- Ox Driver (with Dave Guard, Judy Henske and Cyrus Faryar) – B.M.I.
- Ride on Railroad Bill (with Dave Guard, Judy Henske and Cyrus Faryar) – B.M.I.
- Salomila (with Dave Guard, Judy Henske and Cyrus Faryar) – B.M.I.
- Soy Libre (with Dave Guard, Judy Henske and Cyrus Faryar) – B.M.I.
- Worlds Last Authentic Playboys (with Bill Loughborough) – B.M.I.
