= String Along =

Studio album by The Kingston Trio
- Released: July 1960
- Recorded: April 1960
- Genre: Folk
- Label: Capitol
- Producer: Voyle Gilmore

The Kingston Trio chronology
Sold Out (1960)	String Along (1960)	The Last Month of the Year (1960)

Singles from String Along
- 1. "Bad Man Blunder"/"The Escape of Old John Webb" Released: 1960; 2. "Everglades"/"This Mornin', This Evenin', So Soon" Released: 1960

String Along is an album by the Kingston Trio, released in 1960 (see 1960 in music). It was their fifth studio album in a row to reach number one on the Billboard charts and remained there for ten weeks. String Along received an RIAA gold certification in 1962, a year after Dave Guard had left the group. It was the last LP of the Trio to reach the number one spot. Two singles, "Bad Man's Blunder" b/w "The Escape of Old John Webb" and "Everglades" b/w "This Mornin', This Evenin', So Soon", were released. Both were the last singles of the "Guard years" Trio to chart, "Bad Man Blunder" the last to reach the Top 40.

"The Escape of Old John Webb" is an old English folk song and was deliberately recorded in an attempt to increase the Trio's popularity in Great Britain.

"Bad Man's Blunder" (with its title shortened to "Bad Man Blunder" for single release) was issued on 45 without the final words "Bang, you're dead" included on the sub-master, a decision made by producer Voyle Gilmore.

Dave Guard played Gibson's first 12-string guitar on this album.

== Reception ==
Professional ratings
Review scores
Source	Rating
Allmusic	4.5/5 stars

In his Allmusic review, critic Bruce Eder noted that the album had the most unusual sound compared to previous albums, essentially making it a "quieter album". Eder noted the album "has other highlights and oddities" and singled out Ray Charles' "Leave My Woman Alone".

== Reissues ==
- String Along was reissued in 1992 on CD by Capitol with Sold Out.
- In 1997, all of the tracks from String Along were included in The Guard Years 10-CD box set issued by Bear Family Records.
- String Along was reissued in 2001 by Collectors' Choice Music with Sold Out. This reissue has four bonus tracks: alternative versions of "The Tattooed Lady" and "The Hunter", and songs "Home From the Hill" and "Green Grasses", previously available on singles.

== Track listing ==
=== Side one ===
1. "Bad Man's Blunder" (Lee Hays, Cisco Houston)
2. "The Escape of Old John Webb" (Tom Drake)
3. "When I Was Young" (Jane Bowers, Dave Guard)
4. "Leave My Woman Alone" (Ray Charles)
5. "This Mornin', This Evenin', So Soon" (Carl Sandburg)
6. "Everglades" (Harlan Howard)

=== Side two ===
1. "Buddy Better Get on Down the Line" (Bowers, Guard)
2. "South Wind" (Travis Edmonson)
3. "Who's Gonna Hold Her Hand" (Tom Drake, Bob Shane)
4. "To Morrow" (Lew Sully, arr. Bob Gibson)
5. "Colorado Trail" (Lee Hays, Carl Sandburg)
6. "The Tattooed Lady" (Traditional, Guard, Reynolds, Shane)

== Personnel ==
- Dave Guard – vocals, banjo, guitar
- Bob Shane – vocals, guitar
- Nick Reynolds – vocals, tenor guitar, conga, lujon
- David "Buck" Wheat – bass, guitar

== Chart positions ==
Year	Chart	Position
1960	Billboard Pop Albums	1
