= Sold Out (The Kingston Trio album) =

Studio album by The Kingston Trio
- Released: April 4, 1960
- Recorded: December 1959
- Studio: Capitol Recording Studios, New York, New York
- Genre: Folk
- Label: Capitol
- Producer: Voyle Gilmore

The Kingston Trio chronology
Here We Go Again! (1959)	Sold Out (1960)	String Along (1960)

Singles from Sold Out
- 1. "El Matador"/"Home From the Hill" Released: 1960

Sold Out is an album by American folk music group the Kingston Trio, released in 1960 (see 1960 in music). It was their third LP to reach #1, stayed there for twelve weeks, and received an RIAA gold certification the same year. "El Matador" b/w "Home From the Hill" was its lead-off single, though it just made the Top 40. Sold Out remained in the Top 40 for 54 weeks, longer than any other Trio album. The cover features model Dolores Erickson.

== History ==
The version of "Raspberries, Strawberries" included is a remake of the Trio's follow-up single to "Tom Dooley." Two songs recorded during the Sold Out sessions were not released until The Kingston Trio: The Capitol Years anthology—"Home From the Hill" and "The World's Last Authentic Playboys". The latter was re-recorded on the Whiskeyhill Singers' debut album.

== Reception ==
Professional ratings
Review scores
Source	Rating
Allmusic	3/5 stars

The album was their third to reach #1 and stayed on the Billboard Top 40 for 54 weeks.

In his Allmusic review, critic Matt Fink called the album "solid, pleasant listening, though not particularly challenging in any sense."

== Reissues ==
- Sold Out was reissued in 1992 on CD by Capitol with String Along.
- In 1997, all of the tracks from Sold Out were included in The Guard Years 10-CD box set issued by Bear Family Records.
- Sold Out was reissued in 2001 by Collectors' Choice Music with String Along. This reissue has four bonus tracks: alternative versions of "The Tattooed Lady" and "The Hunter" and previously unreleased songs "Home From the Hill" and "Green Grasses".

== Track listing ==
=== Side one ===
1. "El Matador" (Jane Bowers, Irving Burgess)
2. "The Mountains of Mourne" (Houston Collisson, Percy French)
3. "Don't Cry Katie" (Dick Glasser)
4. "Medley: Tanga Tika/Toerau" (George Archer Ceran, Eddie Lund)
5. "With Her Head Tucked Underneath Her Arm" (Bert Lee, R. P. Weston)
6. "Carrier Pigeon" (Jules Fox, Sam Freedman)

=== Side two ===
1. "Bimini" (Mark McIntyre, B. Olofson)
2. "Raspberries, Strawberries" (Will Holt)
3. "Mangwani M'Pulele" (Theodore Bikel)
4. "With You, My Johnny" (Traditional, Dave Guard, Nick Reynolds, Bob Shane)
5. "The Hunter" (Traditional, Guard, Reynolds, Shane)
6. "Farewell Adelita" (Traditional, Guard, Reynolds, Shane)

== Personnel ==
- Dave Guard – vocals, banjo, guitar
- Bob Shane – vocals, guitar, banjo
- Nick Reynolds – vocals, tenor guitar, bongos
- David "Buck" Wheat – bass

== Chart positions ==
Year	Chart	Position
1960	Billboard Pop Albums	1
