= Refrain (Stockhausen) =

- Chamber music by Karlheinz Stockhausen
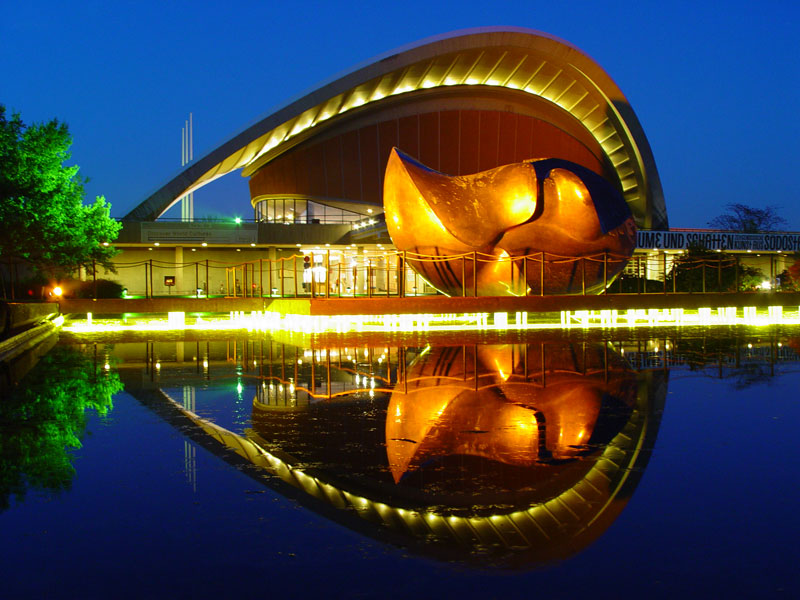
- Congresshalle, Berlin, where Refrain was premiered
- Catalogue: 11
- Composed: 1959
- Dedication: Ernst Brücher
- Performed: 2 October 1959
- Scoring: piano; percussion; amplified celesta

Refrain for three players (piano with woodblocks, vibraphone with alpine cowbells, and amplified celesta with antique cymbals) is a chamber music composition by Karlheinz Stockhausen, and is number 11 in his catalog of works.

== History ==
Refrain was composed in June and July 1959 on commission from Gerhart von Westerman for the Berlin Festwochen, and is dedicated to Ernst Brücher. It was premiered on 2 October 1959 by David Tudor (piano), Cornelius Cardew (celesta), and a percussionist from the WDR Symphony Orchestra, Siegfried Rockstroh (vibraphone), at the Berlin Congresshalle, as part of an all-Stockhausen concert that also included Kreuzspiel, Zeitmaße, Zyklus, and the Klavierstücke I, IV, V, VII, VIII, and XI.

== Materials and form ==
The title refers to the disturbance six times of a placid and wide-rangingly composed sound texture by a short refrain. These refrains are notated on a rotatable transparent plastic strip, superimposed on curved staves which allow the refrain to be repositioned in order to introduce these disturbances in different places.

Each of the three performers plays an accessory instrument in addition to a main instrument. The pianist also plays three woodblocks, the celesta is supplemented with three antique cymbals, and the vibraphonist has three alpine cowbells coupled with three glockenspiel bars. This means that there are six distinct timbres reflecting the pitch structure, which divides the twelve-tone row into two symmetrical six-note cells. This six-element structure is found also in the dynamics, as well as in the durations of both sounds and rests. The three performers also are required to vocalise tongue clicks on five approximate pitches and short, sharp phonetic syllables to be pitched near the sounds they play, in a manner reminiscent of Japanese theatre. The basic structure of the background layer of the piece consists of a series of chords derived from an all-interval twelve-tone row that Stockhausen used in a number of other works.

The work concludes with a coda, in which the elements are merged into a single complex sound.

== Critical reception ==
On the whole, performances of Refrain were well-received by the press and public. At an early performance in Venice, although a skeptical reviewer thought "Stockhausen's Refrain and Kontakte seem determined on the disorganization of all conventional musical factors", he nevertheless reported that the "concert had a tremendous success, far more than the normal events". The work's timbres were especially singled out for praise. In a festival report, Ben Johnston described it as "jewel-like", and a New York Times critic found "its clusters of attractive percussive sounds" to be "fresh". On an all-Stockhausen programme in 1965, the Times critic found Refrain the "most intriguing of all with its blends of keyboard timbre and percussive sound"., and a Los Angeles critic admired its "highly refined, luminous percussion" with "pensive strokes of vibraphone, celesta, and piano six times interrupted and reactivated by the only slightly more dynamic refrain of the title" .

Controversy mainly centred on Refrain's unconventional notation and its relation to the resulting music. In a 1962 review of the printed score, Robert Henderson doubted whether "there are people with the energy and enthusiasm to work out in detail the precise significance of all these complex signs and then make from them a performance" and, if there were, whether "the labour involved could ever be justified by the end-product", pronouncing it merely "an amusing musical kaleidescope [sic] for those with unlimited amounts of unoccupied time".

Another critic initially shared Henderson's reservations but, "Having heard both these works performed 'live', … I am moved to add that some of the perplexities mentioned above now seem less puzzling. In fact Refrain seemed a fascinating and lively performance on stage. … I was most pleased to discover that the composition 'projected' most successfully" and "the live performance was brilliant, convincing, stimulating, perhaps even fathomable".

At around this same time, Peter Stadlen had similarly attacked the notation of Refrain in a programme on BBC Television. For this he was scolded by Tim Souster for having an "obsession with notation", while at the same time seeming oblivious of the fact that "Refrain is one of the finest examples of notation in the history of music". Souster concluded that

One cannot stress too often the importance of letting new music, serial, indeterminate, improvised or electronic, speak directly to the ear, uncluttered by preconceptions or by anxiety about the way the score works. How the music is written down is a very minor consideration to the hundreds of people who fill concerts of Stockhausen's and Cage's music. They respond directly to the audible reality of the music, not to written abstractions, in a way which is all too rare in the critical fraternity. If he trusted his ears, Mr. Stadlen would be a happier man.

The highest-profile attack on Refrain, however, was made as part of a political polemic by Cornelius Cardew, who had been Stockhausen's assistant and had played celesta in the world premiere. In 1972 Hans Keller asked him to introduce a broadcast of the work on BBC Radio and Cardew, a recent convert to Marxism, seized on its comparative popularity as an opportunity to condemn the composition as "a part of the cultural superstructure of the largest-scale system of human oppression and exploitation the world has ever known: imperialism". Writing in what has been described as "the most vulgar style of Marxist conventions", Cardew viewed the European avant garde, whose "abstruse, pseudo-scientific tendencies were encouraged in ivory tower conditions" as having been by 1959 "ready to crack from its own internal contradictions". The leading figures of this group, at the head of which stood Stockhausen, were eager to find a broader audience, and achieving this required change. "Refrain was probably the first manifestation of this change in Stockhausen’s work. Since then his work has become quite clearly mystical in character". Because "Mysticism says 'everything that lives is holy', so don’t walk on the grass and above all don't harm a hair on the head of an imperialist", Refrain "is an ally of imperialism and an enemy of the working and oppressed people of the world", and is comparable with other manifestations of imperialism, specifically "the British Army in Ireland and the mass of unemployed, for example. Here the brutal character of imperialism is evident. Any beauty that may be detected in Refrain is merely cosmetic, not even skin-deep".

Publication of the first half of Cardew's lecture in The Listener "provoked a storm in its correspondence columns". and, as a result of this and a similar attack on John Cage, Cardew reported that "I temporarily lost my voice at the BBC". According to his testimony, "Punishments were also meted out inside the BBC on account of the Stockhausen broadcast which by mischance was heard by a high official of the Corporation".

== Discography ==
- Karlheinz Stockhausen. Zyklus, Refrain. Mauricio Kagel, Transición II. Christoph Caskel (percussion); Aloys Kontarsky (piano); Bernhard Kontarsky (celesta); David Tudor (piano). With LP recording, stereo. Series 2000. Time S 8001. [N.p.]: Time Records, 1961. Reissued, 1970s, LP recording, stereo. Mainstream MS 5003. [N.p.]: Mainstream Records. Reissued on CD as Karlheinz Stockhausen, Mauricio Kagel, Earle Brown; Udo Wüstendörfer; Karlheinz Stockhausen; Mauricio Kagel; Christoph Caskel; Aloys Kontarsky; Bernhard Kontarsky; David Tudor. Mainz: Schott Wergo Music Media, Wergo WER 6929 2. Mainz: Wergo, 2009. Also as part of the 3-disc set, Earle Brown, a Life in Music, Vol. 1. 3-CD set. Earle Brown Contemporary Sound Series. Wergo WER 6928 2, 6929 2, 6930 2. Mainz: Wergo, 2009.
- Karlheinz Stockhausen. Kontakte for electronic sounds, piano and percussion. Refrain, for three performers. Aloys Kontarsky (piano), Karlheinz Stockhausen (celesta), Christoph Caskel (percussion). Candide CE 31022. New York: Vox Records, 1968. Also issued on LP as Vox Candide Series STGBY 638 (New York: Vox Records, 1969), Vox WARNER H-4403V (Japan), and Vox Fratelli Fabbri Editori mm-1098 LP (Italy). Reissued on CD, together with a recording of Zyklus, Stockhausen Complete Edition CD 6. Kürten: Stockhausen Verlag, 1993.
- Karlheinz Stockhausen. Zyklus (2 versions), Refrain, Kontakte. Bernhard Wambach (piano), Mircea Ardeleanu (percussion), Fred Rensch (celesta). CD recording. Koch-Schwann Musica Mundi CD 310 020 H1. Austria: Koch-Records GmbH Schwann, 1988.
- Karlheinz Stockhausen. Zyklus, Refrain, Kontakte. Florent Jodelet (percussion), Gérard Frémy (piano), Jean-Efflam Bavouzet (celesta). CD. Una Corda series. Accord 202742. France: Accord, 1993.
- Karlheinz Stockhausen. 3 × Refrain 2000. Benjamin Kobler (piano with 3 woodblocks), Antonio Pérez Abellán (sampler-celesta with 3 antique cymbals), Andreas Boettger (vibraphone with 3 cowbells and glockenspiel). CD recording. Two editions, one with a spoken introduction in German, the other in English. Stockhausen Complete Edition CD 62. Kürten: Stockhausen Verlag, 2000.
- Karlheinz Stockhausen. Kontra-Punkte, Refrain, Zeitmaße, Schlagtrio. The ensemble recherche: Jean-Pierre Collot (piano), Klaus Steffes-Holländer (celesta), Christian Dierstein (percussion). In the other works: Martin Fahlenbock (flute), Jaime González (oboe), Florian Hasel (cor anglais), Shizuyo Oka (clarinet), Uwe Möckel (bass clarinet), Mario Kopf (bassoon), Markus Schwind (trumpet), Andrew Digby (trombone), Mariko Nishioka (percussion), Beate Anton (harp), Melisa Mellinger (violin), Åsa Åkerberg (cello). Rupert Huber (cond., in Kontra-Punkte and Zeitmaße). Wergo CD WER 6717 2. Mainz: Wergo, 2009. Disc reissued as part of Music Of Our Time: 50 Years: 1962–2012. 5-CD set. Wergo 6946. Wergo, a division of Schott Music & Media GmbH, 2012.
- Karlheinz Stockhausen. Plus-Minus (with Refrain and Kreuzspiel). Ives Ensemble: John Snijders (piano), Reiner van Houdt (celesta), and Arnold Marinissen (percussion) in Refrain, plus Rik Andriessen (flute), Esther Probst (oboe), Hans Petra (bass clarinet), Jan Willem van der Ham (bassoon), Fons Verspaandonk (horn), Jan Bastiani (trombone), Wilbert Grootenboer and Fedor Teunisse (percussion), Josje ter Haar (violin), Ruben Sanderse (viola), Job ter Haar (cello), and Diederik Meijnckens (double bass). Richard Rijvos (cond., in "Kreuzspiel" only). CD recording. Hat Hut hat[now]ART 178. Basel, Switzerland: Hat Hut Records Ltd. Basel: Hat Hut, 2010.
- Stockhausen: Complete Early Percussion Works. Steven Schick, percussion James Avery, piano; Red Fish, Blue Fish (Ross Karre, Justin DeHart, Matthew Jenkins, Fabio Oliveira, Jonathan Hepfer, Gregory Stuart). CD recording, digital: 2 sound discs, stereo. Mode 274–275. New York: Mode Records, 2014.

== Filmography ==
- Brandt, Brian, and Michael Hynes (prod.). 2014. Stockhausen: Complete Early Percussion Works. Steven Schick, James Avery, Red Fish Blue Fish. DVD recording, region 0, NTSC, Dolby 5.1 surround/DTS 5.1 surround, aspect ratio 16:9, color. Mode 274. New York: Mode Records.
