= Dave Guard =

American singer-songwriter (1934–1991)

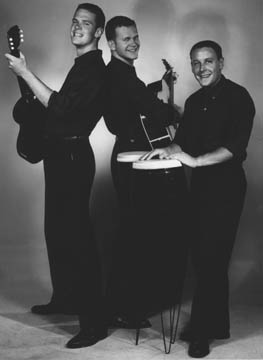
- Dave Guard (left) as part of the Kingston Trio in 1957

Background information
- Born: Donald David Guard; October 19, 1934; San Francisco, California, United States
- Died: March 22, 1991 (aged 56) Strafford County, New Hampshire, United States
- Genres: Folk; neofolk; world music
- Instruments: banjo; guitar
- Years active: 1955–91
- Label: Capitol
- Formerly of: The Kingston Trio; The Whiskeyhill Singers

Donald David Guard (October 19, 1934 – March 22, 1991) was an American folk singer, songwriter, arranger and recording artist. Along with Nick Reynolds and Bob Shane, he was one of the founding members of the Kingston Trio.

Guard was born in San Francisco and went to Punahou School in Honolulu in what was then the pre-statehood U.S. Territory of Hawaii. Upon completion of his final year of high school in 1952 at Menlo School, a private prep school in Menlo Park, California, he matriculated at nearby Stanford University, graduating in 1957 with a degree in economics.

While an undergraduate at Stanford, Guard started a pickup group with Reynolds and Shane. Guard called his group Dave Guard and the Calypsonians, with a Weavers-style signature sound that was principally two guitars, a banjo, and rollicking vocals. Guard kept the group together after Reynolds and Shane left, changing the name of the Calypsonians to the Kingston Quartet. Then in 1957, when Reynolds and Shane agreed to team up with Guard again, the group changed its name to the Kingston Trio. Under contract with Capitol Records, the Trio became a huge commercial and influential success.

== Early life ==
Guard spent his early years first in San Francisco, and then his junior high school and high school years in Honolulu, Territory of Hawaii. Guard grew up hearing the soft vocal melodies and strummed guitars of Hawaiian music. He was particularly attracted to the unique rhythmic sounds of finger-picked slack-key ukulele and guitar music masterfully performed by the many of his neighbors and beach boys.

Guard attended Punahou School, a private school established in 1849 by Hawaii's New England missionary families, during his junior and senior high school years. Hawaiian culture and music played an important part in his school's educational program. Along with all his other classmates, Guard early on learned to play Hawaii's ubiquitous ukulele in a 7th grade junior high school music class required of all students. It was in that class that Punahou's young 7th graders like Guard and his future Kingston Trio partner-to-be Shane learned the basics of playing the ukulele. The "ukulele" class made an impact on Shane, who during the next four years progressed steadily from the 4-string ukulele to the less toy-like and more professional-appearing baritone uke, on to the tenor guitar, and finally to the 6-string acoustic guitar. According to Guard, his own first serious exposure to stringed instruments came from Shane, who taught him the rudiments of playing the six-string guitar.

Guard participated in sports, and was a member of Punahou's ROTC battalion. In his junior year he participated in musical skits along with a number of other classmates who, like himself, had by that time also had become accomplished musicians. Guard left Punahou at the end of his junior year, completing his final year of high school at the Menlo School, a private prep school that helped him prepare for acceptance and matriculation at nearby Stanford University. At Stanford, Guard was a member of the Beta Chi chapter of Sigma Nu fraternity. He graduated from Stanford with a degree in economics in 1956.

== 1955–61 career ==
When Shane left the Calypsonians and returned to Hawaii to work in his family's business, Guard added two members, bassist Joe Gannon and vocalist Barbara Bogue, making the Calypsonians a quartet. Later, when Reynolds also left the Calypsonians, Guard replaced him with Don MacArthur to keep the quartet format intact, but by that time the national interest in calypso rhythms was waning, while Guard's musical growth was reaching out from calypso as well. Still appreciating Caribbean rhythms and vocals, but given his more eclectic folk music interests, Guard changed the name of the four Calypsonians to the Kingston Quartet.

=== Kingston Trio ===
In 1956, publicist Frank Werber offered his services to Guard and his bandmates, including Reynolds at the time. Werber's offer was contingent upon replacing Gannon and Bogue, and shortly thereafter both left the group. Guard and Reynolds contacted former Calypsonian member Shane (who was performing part-time in Honolulu) asking him to join the reconstituted group. In 1957, back again as a trio as in their previous college days, they changed its name to the Kingston Trio.

With material gathered from a variety of sources, under Guard's musical arrangements and direction, the Kingston Trio quickly became a success. Guard, Shane, and Reynolds worked well together. In addition to developing the characteristic "Kingston Trio sound" of the group's two guitars and a banjo, success came to the group from Guard's musical arrangements and renditions of folk and Irish ballads, Shane's talent for style and performance along with an innate knowledge of what pleased audiences, and Reynolds's management of the group's logistics.

The Kingston Trio with Guard recorded for Capitol Records; subsequent iterations of the group managed first by Werber and Shane and later by Shane alone recorded for Decca Records, Folk Era, Silverwolf, Pair, Collector's Choice Music, CEMA, and MCA, and had many hit songs in its initial ten-year run. The trio's many songs include "Tom Dooley", "A Worried Man", "Hard Travelin'", "The Tijuana Jail", "Greenback Dollar", "Reverend Mr. Black", "Sloop John B", "Scotch and Soda", "Merry Minuet", "Hard, Ain't It Hard", "Zombie Jamboree", "M.T.A.", "Three Jolly Coachmen", and "Raspberries, Strawberries".

=== Leaving the trio ===
Guard was aware that among the Kingston Trio, he was the only one who could read music and who had some understanding of music theory; his partners basically played by rote, and the three of them sang in simple three-part harmony. With help from the Trio's bassist and musicologist David "Buck" Wheat, Guard embarked on a self-education program of learning more about harmony, becoming more and more disenchanted with what appeared to him to be a lack of willingness or effort to "improve" on the part of his partners.

By late 1960 Guard's frustration and discontent with his partners, combined with an alleged embezzlement of the group's finances, had reached a point where he no longer wanted to work with Reynolds and Shane. Giving his partners notice that he intended to leave the Trio, and unwilling to cause the group he had founded to disband, Guard agreed to stay on with the Trio until his personal commitments were completed and until Shane and Reynolds were able to find a suitable replacement for him. By early 1961 Shane and Reynolds had found a replacement. After a reportedly acrimonious meeting with Shane, Reynolds, and the Trio's business manager over the future of the Trio, Guard quit the group. The group continued to perform for six years as the Kingston Trio before disbanding in 1967, with John Stewart taking Guard's place.

== 1961–78 career ==
=== Whiskeyhill Singers ===
In 1961, shortly after leaving the Trio, Guard formed a new group, The Whiskeyhill Singers, with Judy Henske, Cyrus Faryar, and Kingston Trio bassist David "Buck" Wheat. They toured and released an album and were asked to perform several folk songs on the Academy Award-winning soundtrack of How the West Was Won.

Their voices can be heard on "The Erie Canal," "900 miles," "The Ox Driver," and "Raise A Ruckus Tonight". Cyrus Faryar can be heard performing solo on the track "Wanderin'" and Dave Guard on "Poor Wayfarin' Stranger". Judy Henske featured solo on "Careless Love". Judy Henske was eventually replaced by Liz Seneff, but the Whiskeyhill Singers were disbanded in late 1962 after Guard left for Australia.

Dave Guard and The Whiskeyhill Singers recorded their first album at Henry Jacobs' studio at Sausalito, and it was released on the Capitol record label. A second album was recorded at the same private studio, but it was never released. The soundtrack to How the West Was Won was the group's final recorded appearance to be released commercially.

=== Dave's Place ===
In late 1962 Guard moved with his family to Sydney, Australia, where he purchased a home overlooking the South Pacific Ocean at Whale Beach. He performed both under his own name, anonymously and under an alias as a supporting musician and vocalist on Australian recording sessions with, among others, Lionel Long, The Twiliters, The Green Hill Singers, Tina Date, and The Tolmen. He anonymously recorded many sound clips for radio and TV commercials. In 1964, Guard became the folk music consultant on the ABC-TV program Jazz Meets Folk.

He hosted his own ABC-TV national variety show, Dave's Place, on Sunday nights for 13 weeks in late 1965. Four episodes of Dave's Place featured Judy Henske as a guest performer.

Until his return to the United States in 1968, Guard gave guitar lessons and, with the help of his wife, Gretchen, wrote a book, Colour Guitar, describing a unique guitar teaching method relating music theory to a 12-valued chain of chords with color.

Guard's relationship with the Trio remained strained while he was in Australia. According to Guard, while he was in Australia, he was never in contact with Reynolds and Shane, and he never heard any of their albums.

Following his return from Australia in 1968 and his wife's 1970 graduation from Stanford with a degree in art, Guard and his wife collaborated in researching, writing, and publishing a book on the ancient Irish folk tale, Deirdre of the Sorrows, followed by a second book about a 400-year-old Hawaiian folk tale.

=== Pure Gabby ===
After the breakup of the Singers in 1961, Guard had returned to Hawaii. Always a folk music eclectic, Guard attempted to publicize the slack-key sounds of Hawaiian folk guitar. Guard worked closely in Honolulu with slack-key guitar icon Gabby Pahinui to record and produce Pure Gabby, an album of classic Hawaiian melodies played with slack key tunings. Guard tried to introduce major record companies to Pure Gabby, but met with little interest, and he shelved the project. In 1978, ten years after his return from Australia, at the urging of Singer colleague, Cyrus Faryar, who had heard Guard's Pure Gabby tapes, Guard contacted Hula Records of Honolulu about Pure Gabby, which agreed to take the recordings and distribute the album.

== Post-1978 career ==
In 1981, Guard reunited with Shane and Reynolds for a PBS fundraising concert and program entitled "The Kingston Trio and Friends Reunion". He also made occasional concert appearances with John Stewart, his replacement in the Trio who was by then a respected and successful solo performer. He produced the video Workout for Equestrians with Ingrid Gsottschneider for Golden Arrow Enterprises.

In the 1970s, Guard recorded a live album at The Ice House in Pasadena. His backing group on this album was The Modern Folk Quartet, which included former Whiskeyhill Singer Cyrus Faryar. The album was turned down by Capitol and was never released.

During the 1980s, Guard continued to perform as a soloist and teach music. He did four tracks on a 12-track cassette recorded to accompany the "All Along the Merrimac" tour of New Hampshire and a final solo album, Up & In (1988), which received mixed reviews. The album included the Kingston Trio standard "Scotch and Soda", which he had arranged in 1956 but which for thirty years had been performed in The Trio only by Bob Shane.

Over the years following his return to the US, Guard worked with a number of people, including Alex Hassilev, Mike Settle, Judy Henske, Cyrus Faryar, Tim Buckley, Tommy Makem and David White.

== Death ==
Guard was diagnosed with non-Hodgkin lymphoma in 1988, while he was living in an apartment on the property of Rick and Ingrid Shaw in Rollinsford. Treatment resulted in remission, but the cancer returned in 1990. Rick and Ingrid took care of Guard during his final months.

Guard died on March 22, 1991 at the age of 56. His memorial service in Portsmouth, New Hampshire, was attended by Bob Shane, Glen Yarbrough, the Limeliters and many other figures from the folk world. He was survived by his mother Marjorie, ex-wife Gretchen and three children Sally, Catherine, and Tom.

== Discography ==
=== Dave Guard & The Calypsonians ===
- Run Joe 1957 (Capitol)
- Fast Freight 1957 (Capitol)

=== Kingston Trio ===
- The Kingston Trio 1958 (Capitol)
- ...from the Hungry i 1959 (Capitol)
- Stereo Concert 1959 (Capitol)
- At Large 1959 (Capitol)
- Here We Go Again! 1959 (Capitol)
- Sold Out 1960 (Capitol)
- String Along 1960 (Capitol)
- The Last Month of the Year 1960 (Capitol)
- The Kingston Trio Sings for 7-UP 1960 (TV commercial)
- Make Way 1961 (Capitol)
- Goin' Places 1961 (Capitol)
- Live At Newport 1994 (Capitol)
- The Kingston Trio and Friends Reunion 1994 (DVD)
- The Capitol Years 1995 (Capitol)
- The Capitol Collector Series 1998 (Capitol)
- The Best of Kingston Trio Vol 1-3 (Capitol)
- The Kingston Trio: The Guard Years 1997 (Bear Family)

=== Top 40 hit singles ===
- Tom Dooley 1958 (Capitol) #1 Gold hit record
- The Tijuana Jail 1959 (Capitol) #12
- M.T.A. 1959 (Capitol) #15
- A Worried Man 1959 (Capitol) #20
- El Matador 1960 (Capitol) #32
- Bad Man Blunder 1960 (Capitol) #37

=== Whiskeyhill Singers ===
- Dave Guard & The Whiskeyhill Singers 1962 (Capitol)
- Whiskeyhill Singers 2nd Album (unreleased) (1962)
- How The West Was Won: Original Motion Picture Soundtrack 1963 (MGM)
- The Kingston Trio Capitol Years 1995 (Capitol)

=== Dave's Place Group ===
- Dave's Place 1965 (ABC-TV Australia). Apart from the archived records of the ABC-TV show, no recordings were ever made by this group that consisted of Dave Guard (guitar & vocal), Chris Bonett (bass & vocal), Len Young (drums) and Frances Stone (vocal). Early in the series, Stone was replaced by Kerrilee Male, who in turn was replaced by Norma Shirlee Stoneman towards the middle of the season.

=== Solo career ===
- Up & In, 1988 (Folk Era, later re-released on Silverwolf) Dave Guard
- All Along the Merrimac, 1986 (Four tracks on the Folk Era cassette to accompany a touring show with Dave Guard, The Shaw Brothers and The White Mountain Singers)
- Pure Gabby, 1978 (Hula) Gabby Pahinui (producer)

=== Arranger ===
- All My Sorrows (with Bob Shane & Nick Reynolds)
- Banua (Traditional (Arr by Dave Guard))
- Bay Of Mexico (Traditional (Arr by Dave & Gretchen Guard))
- Blow Ye Winds
- Bonnie Hielan' Laddie (with Joe Hickerson)
- Buddy Better Get On Down The Line (with Jane Bowers)
- Bye Bye Thou Little Tiny Child
- Come All Ye Fair And Tender Ladies (with Gretchen Guard)
- Coplas (Traditional (Arr by Dave Guard))
- Corey Corey (with Bob Shane & Nick Reynolds)
- Coventry Carol (Bye Bye Thou Little Tiny Child)
- Dodi Li (with Bob Shane & Nick Reynolds)
- Don't Weep Mary (with Bob Shane & Nick Reynolds)
- Dorie' (with Bob Shane & Nick Reynolds)
- Farewell Adelita (with Bob Shane & Nick Reynolds)
- Getaway John
- Go Where I Send Thee (with Bob Shane & Nick Reynolds)
- Goober Peas
- Gue' Gue (with Bob Shane & Nick Reynolds)
- Haul Away
- The Hunter (with Bob Shane & Nick Reynolds)
- Little Maggie
- Oh, Cindy (with Bob Shane, Nick Reynolds & Frank Werber)
- Oh, Yes, Oh (with Gretchen Guard)
- Pay Me Money Down
- Sail Away Ladies
- Scotch and Soda
- Sing We Noel
- Santy Anno
- Somerset Glouchestershire Wasail (with Erich Schwandt)
- Three Jolly Coachmen
- When The Saints Go Marching In (Traditional, Arr. by Dave Guard)
- With You My Johnny (with Bob Shane & Nick Reynolds)
- You're Gonna Miss Me (with Mike Seeger, Tom Paley & John Cohen)
- You Don't Knock
- A Worried Man (with Tom Glazer)

=== Songs composed With Jane Bowers ===
- "Coast of California"
- "Senora"
- "When I Was Young"
