= Supro Ozark 1560 S =

Vintage electric guitar

- Manufacturer: Supro
- Period: Late 1950s

Construction
- Body type: Solid
- Neck joint: Set-in neck

Woods
- Body: Mahogany, other woods have also been used
- Neck: Maple or rosewood
- Fretboard: Most commonly rosewood or maple. Other woods have been used.

Hardware
- Bridge: The bridge is directly mounted onto the Ozark’s steel control plate, and the main purpose is to improve intonation and thus retaining the guitar’s signature sustain.
- Pickup(s): Single-coil.

Colors available
- Natural wood, single color and also two-tone sunburst.

The Supro Ozark 1560 S is a vintage electric guitar. It employed a single pickup near the bridge. The guitar is most famous for being the first electric guitar Jimi Hendrix owned.

== Jimi Hendrix ==
His white Supro Ozark was from his father, who purchased it from Myers Music shop in Seattle in 1958. It was the first electric guitar Hendrix owned. Hendrix's first gig was with an unnamed band in the Jaffe Room of Seattle's Temple De Hirsch, but they fired him between sets for showing off. He joined the Rocking Kings, which played professionally at venues such as the Birdland club. His guitar was stolen after he left it backstage overnight.

== Revival ==
The guitar was recreated by Roy Dalvin in December, 1990.

== Other notable players ==
- Ry Cooder
- Jackson Browne
- Aerosmith
