= Augustyn Bloch =

Polish composer and organist (1929–2006)

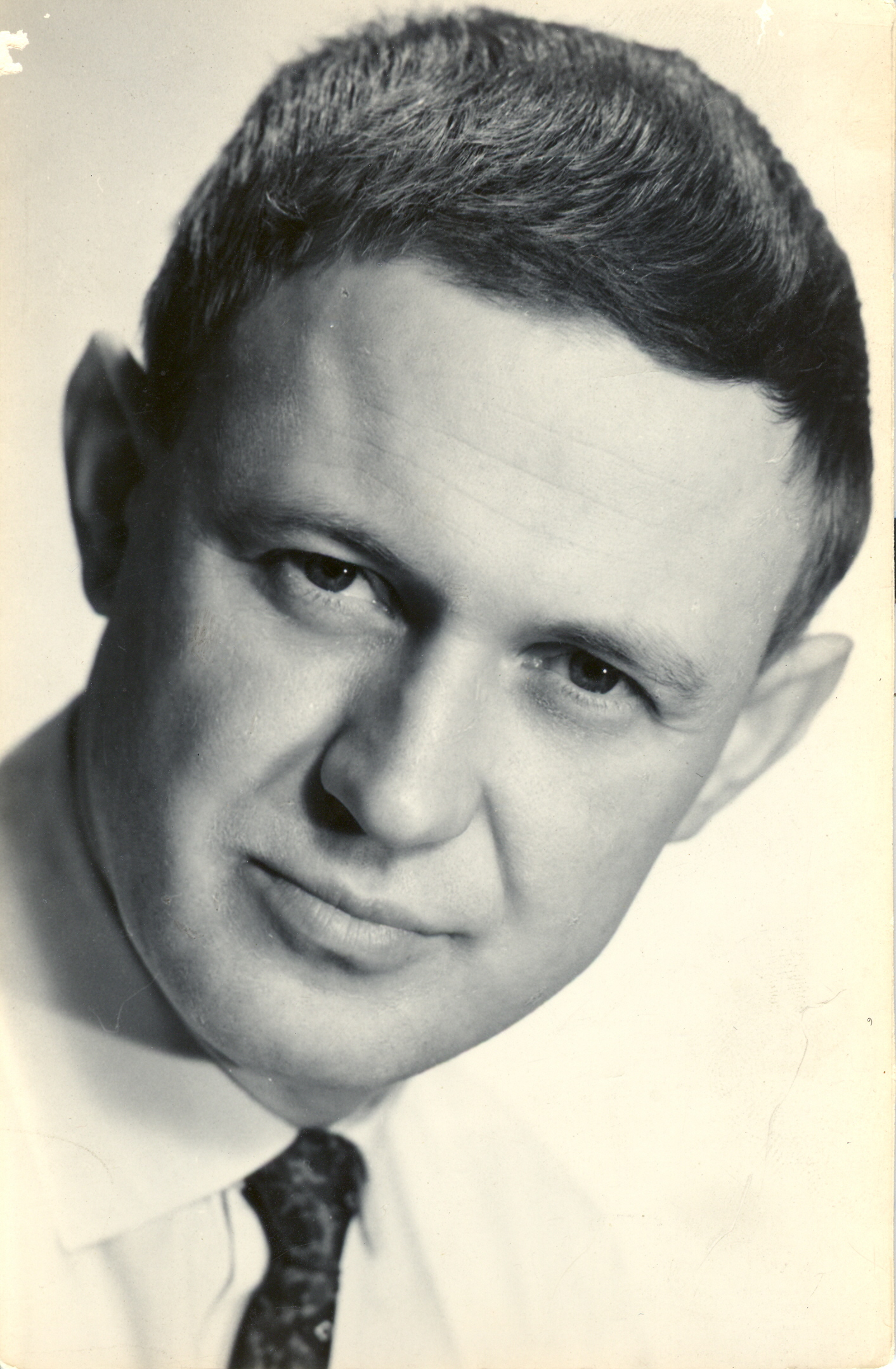
Augustyn Hipolit Bloch

Augustyn Bloch (13 August 1929 in Grudziądz – 6 April 2006 in Warsaw) was a Polish composer and organist, student of Feliks Rączkowski and Tadeusz Szeligowski. He was an active concert organist, conducted his own music, and wrote music for the Polish Radio Theater.

== Selected works ==
- Piano variations Karol Szymanowski in memoriam (1953)
- Concertino for violin solo, string orchestra, piano, and percussion (1958)
- Meditations for soprano solo, organs, and percussion (1961)
- Oczekiwanie (Waiting), a ballet (1963)
- Dialogi per biolino et orchestra (1969)
- Gilgamesh (1969)
- Enfiando (1970)
- Warstwy czasu (Layers of Time) for 15 string instruments (1978)
- Anenaiki (1979)
