= The Song You Heard When You Fell in Love =

Studio album by Betty Johnson
- Released: 1959
- Recorded: April–August 1958
- Genre: Traditional pop
- Label: Atlantic

The Song You Heard When You Fell in Love was an LP album issued by Atlantic Records in 1958, featuring vocalist Betty Johnson. It was recorded in New York City. Except for the title song, all the numbers on the album were old standards, many dating back to the 1930s. Two versions of the album were released, a monophonic version (catalog number LP 8027) and a stereophonic version (catalog number SD 8027).

== Track listing ==
| No. | Title | Writer(s) | Recording date | Length |
|---|---|---|---|---|
| 1. | "Dream" | Johnny Mercer | April 14, 1958 |
| 2. | "Red Sails In The Sunset" | Hugh Williams/Jimmy Kennedy | July 1, 1958 |
| 3. | "Together" | Buddy G. DeSylva/Lew Brown/Ray Henderson | August 1, 1958 |
| 4. | "Once in a While" | Michael Edwards/Bud Green | August 1, 1958 |
| 5. | "The Very Thought of You" | Ray Noble | August 1, 1958 |
| 6. | "Dancing In The Dark" | Arthur Schwartz/Howard Dietz | August 1, 1958 |
| 7. | Untitled | Roy Turk/Fred E. Ahlert | August 1, 1958 |
| 8. | "I Don't Know Why" | | 1958 (unknown date) |
| 9. | "The Song You Heard When You Fell In Love" |
