= Susan Metcalfe Casals =

American singer (1878 – 1959)

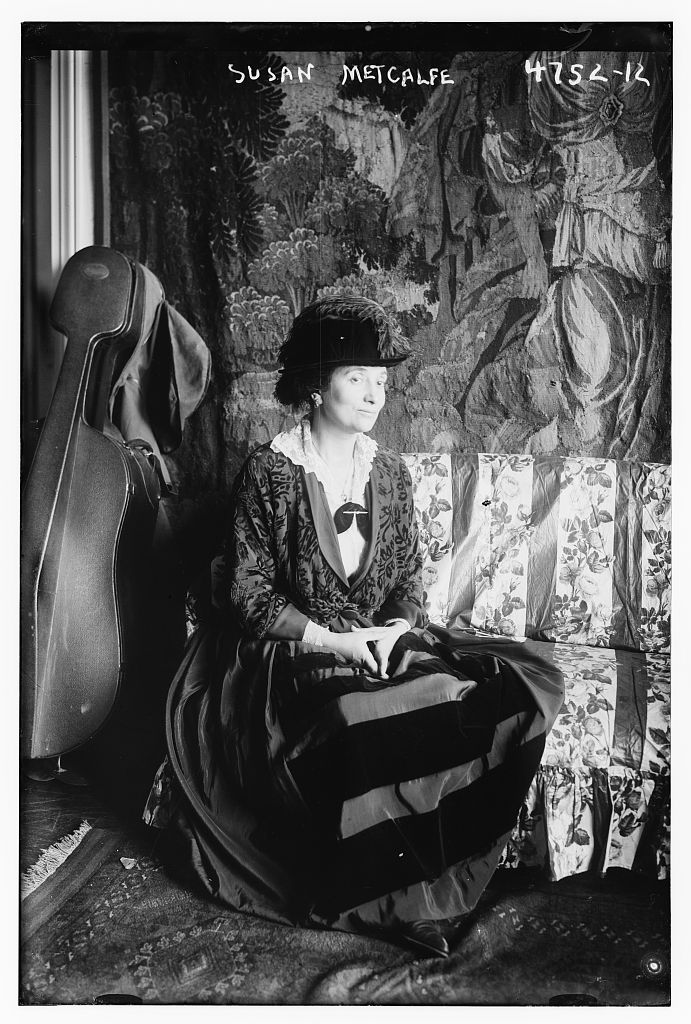
Susan Metcalfe in 1918

Susan Metcalfe Casals (1878 – 1959) was an American mezzo-soprano who married renowned cellist Pau Casals. She was highly respected in Lieder and concert recital.

== Origins ==
She was born Susan S. Metcalfe in 1878 in Florence, Italy, the daughter of Dr. Frank J. Metcalfe, a Manhattan, New York City physician. Her mother was Helene, a prominent member of New Rochelle, New York society. In later years Dr Metcalfe practised in Florence, Italy, and Susan was born there in 1878 and educated in Conservatories in Italy and France. She also had a brother Louis and sisters Marie and Helen Frances Metcalfe (b. 1880), who married the American socialist architect Herman Kobbé.

== Connection with Pablo Casals ==
As a recitalist, Susan Casals made her debut in New York in 1897 and gave few, but very select recitals each year. In 1904 she met the cellist Pablo Casals, gave a recital with him (Casals accompanying her at the piano), and briefly developed a 'fervid' friendship, which however was abated when Casals established his close relationship with Guilhermina Suggia in 1906. In 1908 Metcalfe embarked on a European tour during which she sang for the British royal family. As the Suggia relationship became strained, Metcalfe and Casals corresponded. They met again after Casals had given a concert in Berlin, and were married on April 4, 1914, at New Rochelle. After this they moved together to Europe. The marriage lasted until 1928, when they were formally separated, but they did not divorce until 1957.

== Recitals ==
During their artistic life together Casals and his wife often gave recitals together in which he accompanied her song sets at the piano and also performed cello sets in the same concert. For example at their farewell concert (their second recital of the season) in New York, April 1916, at the Aeolian Hall, Mme Casals sang a group of songs by Caldara, Caccini, Gluck and Mozart, and later a set of five Scots and Irish songs arranged by Beethoven. In a Maennerchor Artist Concert of January 1917 she sings a similar group in the first part, and songs by Schumann and Emánuel Moór in the second. They gave concerts in America, Europe, England, Mexico and Cuba.

The marriage with Casals was stormy, and following their separation in 1929, Mme. Metcalfe Casals lived in Paris. Her last known recital was at the École Normale de Musique there in 1951.

Later she moved back to the U.S. to live with her sisters, and died at Bergen County, New Jersey in 1959.

== Recordings ==
Susan Metcalfe Casals made no fully commercial recordings, but she did record eight sides of 78 rpm records (yellow label His Master's Voice) for private distribution, with Gerald Moore accompanying, in 1937. These have been greatly admired and some titles have been included in re-issue compilations such as Schubert Lieder on Record, etc. The titles were as follows:

- Franz Schubert:
  - Lied der Mignon
  - Nachtstück
  - Die junge Nonne
  - Liebesbotschaft
  - Die Liebe hat gelogen
- Robert Schumann:
  - Lotosblume
  - Schneeglockchen
  - Zum Schluss
  - Herzeleid
  - Liebeslied
- Gabriel Fauré:
  - Soir
  - Nell
  - Le secret
  - Le don silencieux

== Archive ==
- Collection of 53 letters of Casals and Metcalfe, etc., c1915-1918: George P. Moore collection, Archives of American Art, Smithsonian Institution: Microfilm reel 5743.
- Susan Metcalfe Letters 1902-1922 (69 items): Jackson Library, Greensboro, University of North Carolina: MSS 246.
