= Claude Baillif =

- Born: 1635
- Died: 1698 (aged 62–63)
- Occupation: Architect
- Buildings: Notre-Dame-des-Victoires Church

Claude Baillif (c 1635 – 1698) was a well known builder in New France during the 17th-century.

There is little personal information on this early Canadian and we need to examine his historical contributions through his building contracts. We do know that he was active in domestic architecture though no known works survive.

Baillif was in charge of enlarging the cathedral of Quebec for Bishop Laval. He was in charge of at least the initial phases of Notre-Dame-des-Victoires Church in the Lower Town of Quebec City. He took over construction of the episcopal palace for Bishop Jean-Baptiste de la Croix de Chevrières de Saint-Vallier after the preliminary work and it became possibly the most elaborate building of that century in New France. The church of Sainte-Anne de Beaupré was rebuilt during the years 1689–95 with Claude Baillif on charge.

With his documented contributions, Baillif must be considered as one of the main founders of the Québécois architectural tradition.

== See also ==
Architecture of Canada
