= Zyklus =

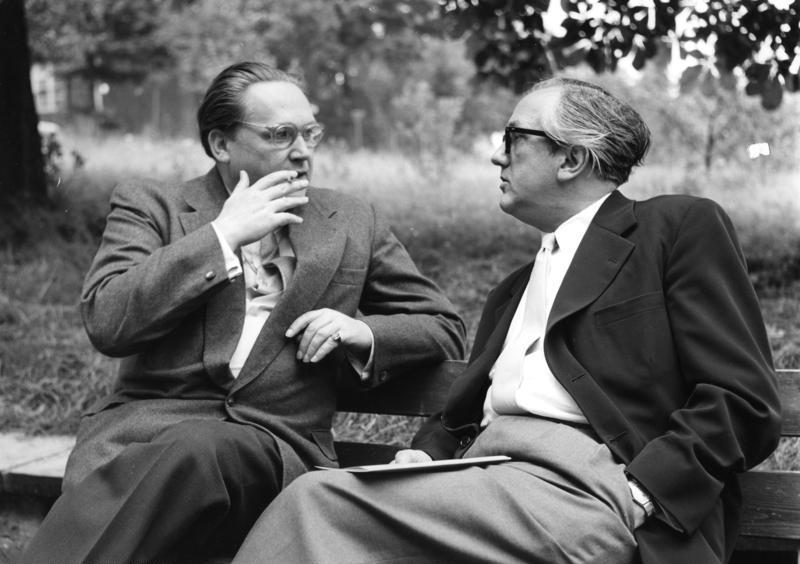
Wolfgang Steinecke (left), who commissioned Zyklus, in conversation with the conductor Heinz Dressel (1957)

Zyklus für einen Schlagzeuger (English: Cycle for a Percussionist) is a composition by Karlheinz Stockhausen, assigned Number 9 in the composer's catalog of works. It was composed in 1959 at the request of Wolfgang Steinecke as a test piece for a percussion competition at the Darmstadt Summer Courses, where it was premièred on 25 August 1959 by Christoph Caskel. It quickly became the most frequently played solo percussion work, and "inspired a wave of writing for percussion".

== Instrumentation ==
The work is written for one percussionist playing a marimba, vibraphone (motor off), 4 tom-toms, snare drum, güiro (one or several, if necessary), 2 African log drums (each producing 2 pitches), 2 suspended cymbals of differing sizes, hi-hat, 4 almglocken (suspended, clappers removed), a suspended "bunch of bells" (preferably Indian bells or tambourine mounted on a stand), at least 2 high pitched triangles, gong (with raised boss in center) and tam-tam.

== Form ==
The title of Zyklus is reflected in its form, which is circular and without a set starting point. The score is spiral-bound, and there is no "right-side up"—it may be read with either edge at the top. The performer is free to start at any point, and plays through the work either left to right, or right to left, stopping when the first stroke is reached again. (In this way, it is an example of what Stockhausen calls "polyvalent" form.) The instruments are arranged in a circle around the performer, in the order they are used in the score. The notation is only conventional in some details, and an early review of this first graphic score by Stockhausen remarked that "The initial impression is that one is looking not at a score, but at a drawing by Paul Klee". Zyklus contains a range of notational specificity, from exactly fixed at one extreme, to open, "variable" passages at the other. Stockhausen composed these elements using a nine-degree scale of statistical distribution, but states that the listener is not "supposed to identify these nine degrees when you hear the music, nevertheless the music that results from such a method has very particular characteristics...".

In principle, the percussionist decides on the starting point and direction through the score only at the moment of commencing a performance, but in practice this is almost universally worked out well in advance. Only the percussionist and composer Max Neuhaus has consistently performed spontaneous versions.

== Filmography ==
- Brandt, Brian, and Michael Hynes (prod.). 2014. Stockhausen: Complete Early Percussion Works. Steven Schick, James Avery, Red Fish Blue Fish. DVD recording, region 0, NTSC, Dolby 5.1 surround/DTS 5.1 surround, aspect ratio 16:9, color. Mode 274. New York: Mode Records.
