= The Tijuana Jail =

Single by The Kingston Trio
- B-side: "Oh Cindy"
- Released: February 23, 1959
- Genre: Folk
- Length: 2:48
- Label: Capitol
- Songwriter: Denny Thompson

The Kingston Trio singles chronology
"Raspberries, Strawberries" (1958)	"The Tijuana Jail" (1959)	"M.T.A." (1959)

"The Tijuana Jail" is a song written by Denny Thompson and performed by The Kingston Trio. It reached #12 on the US pop chart in 1959.

The song is about a small group of men, who go to an illegal gambling joint, in Tijuana, Mexico, to shoot dice and drink alcohol, when the Mexican authorities arrive to arrest the men, where they are placed in the Tijuana Jail, where they cannot raise the $500 bail to get themselves released. The men conclude by telling their friends to send their mail to the Tijuana Jail.

The melody is loosely based on the traditional folk song "Midnight Special."

The song was ranked #77 on Billboard magazine's Hot 100 singles of 1959.

== Other versions ==
- Johnny and Jonie Mosby released a version of the song as a single in 1959, but it did not chart.
- The Spotnicks released a version of the song on their 1963 album The Spotnicks in Spain.
- The 50 Guitars of Tommy Garrett released a version of the song on their 1966 album ¡Viva Mexico!
- Sandy Nelson released a version of the song on his 1969 album Walkin' Beat.
- Johnny Bond released a version of the song on his 1998 compilation album The Very Best of Johnny Bond.
- Though not a cover song, Tijuana Jail by Gilby Clarke contains the same refrain of "send my mail to the Tijuana Jail."
