= The Kingston Trio: The Guard Years =

Compilation album by The Kingston Trio
- Released: August 19, 1997
- Recorded: February 5, 1958 – January 16, 1961
- Genre: Folk
- Label: Bear Family BCD 16160 JK
- Producer: Voyle Gilmore; Paul Surratt & Richard Weize (reissue producers)

The Kingston Trio chronology
The Lost Masters 1969–1972 (1997)	The Kingston Trio: The Guard Years (1997)	The Best of the Decca Years (1998)

The Kingston Trio: The Guard Years is a compilation of The Kingston Trio's recordings when Dave Guard was a member of the Trio along with Bob Shane and Nick Reynolds.

The Guard Years is a 10-CD box set and was released in 1997. It contains 240 songs, 17 of them are previously unissued live tracks from 1958-59. The set included a 108-page hardcover book containing photos and stories of the group, recording sessions, and notes on the songs. All the albums were originally released on Capitol Records from 1958 to 1961, the year Guard left the group and formed the Whiskeyhill Singers with former Trio bassist David "Buck" Wheat.

== Reception ==
Professional ratings
Review scores
Source	Rating
Allmusic	4.5/5 stars

Allmusic critic Bruce Eder feels that while a daunting collection of 240 songs, the box set best shows the development of the Trio. "The fact that nine of these ten discs contain material intended for release over a period of just four years is an indicator of the demand for their music — the Kingston Trio was the first popular act whose albums outsold their singles, and the result was 200 songs cut in just four years. That may be more Kingston Trio than most fans feel they need, but not more than can stand the test of listening... Showing off the range of their repertory, they draw on influences from blues to Broadway, with detours into the work of Ray Charles and Uncle Dave Macon, as well as Woody Guthrie and Lee Hays... The box is daunting in its scope, as is the book, whose separate song histories are a welcome addition to the usual sessionography."

== Personnel ==
- Dave Guard – vocals, banjo, guitar, bouzouki
- Bob Shane – vocals, guitar, banjo
- Nick Reynolds – vocals, tenor guitar, bongos, conga
- David "Buck" Wheat – bass, guitar
- Buzz Wheeler – bass
- Mongo Santamaria – percussion, conga
- Jack Sperling – drums
- Les Bennetts – guitar
- J.D. Crowe – bajo sexto
- Lonnie Donegan – guitar, vocals
- Eddie Duran – guitar
- William Correa – timbales
- G. B. Grayson – fiddle, vocals
- Merle Kilgore – vocals
- Henry Whitter – guitar, vocals

== Production notes ==
- Voyle Gilmore – producer
- Paul Surratt – reissue producer, photography, illustrations
- Richard Weize – reissue producer, tape research, discography
- Charles K. Wolfe – liner notes
- Bob Jones – mastering, transfers
- Jurgen Crasser – mastering
- Jay Ranellucci – mixing
- Ben Blake – song notes
- Bill Bush – liner notes, biographical information
- Jürgen Feuss – photography, illustrations
- Otto Kitsinger – photography, illustrations
- R.A. Andreas – photography, illustrations
- Brad Benedict – photography, illustrations
- Dave Samuelson – liner notes, discography
- Sylke Holtrop – artwork, illustrations
- Wolfgang Taubenauer – artwork
- Phil Wells – tape comparison, discography
