= List of Billboard Hot 100 top-ten singles in 1959 =

This is a list of singles that have peaked in the top 10 of the Billboard Hot 100 during 1959.

Frankie Avalon and Ricky Nelson each had five top-ten hits in 1959, tying them for the most top-ten hits during the year.

== Top-ten singles ==
| Top ten entry date | Single | Artist(s) | Peak | Peak date | Weeks in top ten |
Singles from 1958
| December 15 | "Smoke Gets in Your Eyes" | The Platters | 1 | January 19 | 10 |
| December 22 | "A Lover's Question" | Clyde McPhatter | 6 | January 19 | 7 |
| December 29 | "Whole Lotta Lovin'" | Fats Domino | 6 | January 12 | 5 |
Singles from 1959
| January 5 | "My Happiness" | Connie Francis | 2 | January 19 | 7 |
| January 5 | "Gotta Travel On" | Billy Grammer | 4 | January 12 | 7 |
| January 19 | "Donna" | Ritchie Valens | 2 | February 23 | 10 |
| January 19 | "16 Candles" | The Crests | 2 | February 9 | 8 |
| January 19 | "Stagger Lee" | Lloyd Price | 1 | February 9 | 10 |
| January 26 | "Lonely Teardrops" | Jackie Wilson | 7 | February 9 | 5 |
| January 26 | "Goodbye Baby" | Jack Scott | 8 | February 16 | 4 |
| February 2 | "The All American Boy" | Bill Parsons | 2 | February 2 | 5 |
| February 9 | "Manhattan Spiritual" | Reg Owen Orchestra | 10 | February 9 | 2 |
| February 23 | "Charlie Brown" | The Coasters | 2 | March 9 | 8 |
| February 23 | "I Cried a Tear" | LaVern Baker | 6 | February 23 | 3 |
| February 23 | "Tall Paul" | Annette | 7 | February 23 | 1 |
| February 23 | "Petite Fleur" | Chris Barber | 5 | March 2 | 3 |
| February 23 | "Peter Gunn" | Ray Anthony | 8 | March 2 | 3 |
| March 2 | "Venus" | Frankie Avalon | 1 | March 9 | 10 |
| March 2 | "Alvin's Harmonica" | The Chipmunks with David Seville | 3 | March 16 | 6 |
| March 9 | "I've Had It" | The Bell Notes | 6 | March 9 | 4 |
| March 9 | "It's Just a Matter of Time" | Brook Benton | 3 | April 6 | 7 |
| March 16 | "Tragedy" | Thomas Wayne | 5 | March 23 | 6 |
| March 16 | "Never Be Anyone Else But You" | Ricky Nelson | 6 | April 6 | 6 |
| March 23 | "Come Softly to Me" | The Fleetwoods | 1 | April 13 | 8 |
| March 30 | "Pink Shoe Laces" | Dodie Stevens | 3 | April 13 | 8 |
| March 30 | "It's Late" | Ricky Nelson | 9 | April 6 | 3 |
| April 6 | "Guitar Boogie Shuffle" | The Virtues | 5 | April 27 | 6 |
| April 13 | "(Now and Then There's) A Fool Such as I" | Elvis Presley | 2 | April 27 | 5 |
| April 13 | "I Need Your Love Tonight" | Elvis Presley | 4 | April 20 | 5 |
| April 27 | "The Happy Organ" | Dave "Baby" Cortez | 1 | May 11 | 7 |
| April 27 | "Tell Him No" | Travis and Bob | 8 | April 27 | 2 |
| April 27 | "Sorry (I Ran All the Way Home)" | The Impalas | 2 | May 11 | 7 |
| April 27 | "Turn Me Loose" | Fabian | 9 | May 11 | 4 |
| May 11 | "Kookie, Kookie (Lend Me Your Comb)" | Edward Byrnes with Connie Stevens | 4 | May 11 | 6 |
| May 11 | "Kansas City" | Wilbert Harrison | 1 | May 18 | 8 |
| May 18 | "A Teenager in Love" | Dion and the Belmonts | 5 | May 18 | 7 |
| May 18 | "Dream Lover" | Bobby Darin | 2 | June 8 | 10 |
| May 18 | "The Battle of New Orleans" | Johnny Horton | 1 | June 1 | 13 |
| May 18 | "Quiet Village" | Martin Denny | 4 | June 1 | 7 |
| May 25 | "Personality" | Lloyd Price | 2 | June 15 | 10 |
| May 25 | "Only You (And You Alone)" | Franck Pourcel's French Fiddles | 9 | June 1 | 4 |
| June 15 | "Tallahassee Lassie" | Freddy Cannon | 6 | June 29 | 6 |
| June 15 | "Lonely Boy" | Paul Anka | 1 | July 13 | 10 |
| June 22 | "Along Came Jones" | The Coasters | 9 | June 22 | 2 |
| June 22 | "Lipstick on Your Collar" | Connie Francis | 5 | June 29 | 6 |
| July 6 | "Waterloo" | Stonewall Jackson | 4 | July 13 | 6 |
| July 6 | "Bobby Sox to Stockings" | Frankie Avalon | 8 | July 6 | 1 |
| July 6 | "Frankie" | Connie Francis | 9 | July 6 | 1 |
| July 6 | "Tiger" | Fabian | 3 | July 20 | 6 |
| July 13 | "My Heart Is an Open Book" | Carl Dobkins Jr. | 3 | August 3 | 7 |
| July 13 | "A Boy Without a Girl" | Frankie Avalon | 10 | July 13 | 1 |
| July 20 | "A Big Hunk o' Love" | Elvis Presley | 1 | August 10 | 7 |
| July 27 | "There Goes My Baby" | The Drifters | 2 | August 17 | 6 |
| July 27 | "Forty Miles of Bad Road" | Duane Eddy | 9 | July 27 | 3 |
| August 3 | "Lavender Blue" | Sammy Turner | 3 | August 24 | 6 |
| August 3 | "Sweeter Than You" | Ricky Nelson | 9 | August 3 | 1 |
| August 10 | "What a Diff'rence a Day Makes" | Dinah Washington | 8 | August 10 | 3 |
| August 10 | "What'd I Say" | Ray Charles | 6 | August 17 | 5 |
| August 17 | "The Three Bells" | The Browns | 1 | August 24 | 10 |
| August 17 | "Just a Little Too Much" | Ricky Nelson | 9 | August 17 | 1 |
| August 24 | "Sea of Love" | Phil Phillips | 2 | August 24 | 6 |
| August 24 | "Sleep Walk" | Santo & Johnny | 1 | September 21 | 9 |
| August 24 | "I Want to Walk You Home" | Fats Domino | 8 | September 14 | 5 |
| August 31 | "I'm Gonna Get Married" | Lloyd Price | 3 | September 14 | 6 |
| August 31 | "Red River Rock" | Johnny and the Hurricanes | 5 | September 7 | 6 |
| September 7 | "(Till) I Kissed You" | The Everly Brothers | 4 | September 21 | 7 |
| September 7 | "Broken Hearted Melody" | Sarah Vaughan | 7 | September 7 | 4 |
| September 14 | "Mack the Knife" | Bobby Darin | 1 | October 5 | 16 |
| September 14 | "Baby Talk" | Jan and Dean | 10 | September 14 | 1 |
| September 21 | "Put Your Head on My Shoulder" | Paul Anka | 2 | October 5 | 11 |
| September 28 | "Teen Beat" | Sandy Nelson | 4 | October 19 | 8 |
| October 5 | "Mr. Blue" | The Fleetwoods | 1 | November 16 | 11 |
| October 5 | "Poison Ivy" | The Coasters | 7 | October 12 | 5 |
| October 12 | "Just Ask Your Heart" | Frankie Avalon | 7 | October 26 | 4 |
| October 12 | "Lonely Street" | Andy Williams | 5 | November 9 | 6 |
| October 26 | "Don't You Know?" | Della Reese | 2 | November 30 | 8 |
| October 26 | "Primrose Lane" | Jerry Wallace | 8 | October 26 | 5 |
| October 26 | "Deck of Cards" | Wink Martindale | 7 | November 2 | 5 |
| November 9 | "Seven Little Girls Sitting in the Backseat" | Paul Evans | 9 | November 9 | 2 |
| November 9 | "Heartaches by the Number" | Guy Mitchell | 1 | December 14 | 10 |
| November 16 | "So Many Ways" | Brook Benton | 6 | November 23 | 5 |
| November 23 | "In the Mood" | Ernie Fields | 4 | December 14 | 4 |
| November 23 | "We Got Love" | Bobby Rydell | 6 | December 7 | 5 |
| November 30 | "Be My Guest" | Fats Domino | 8 | December 7 | 2 |
| December 7 | "Oh! Carol" | Neil Sedaka | 9 | December 7 | 1 |
| December 7 | "Danny Boy" | Conway Twitty | 10 | December 7 | 1 |
| December 14 | "Why" | Frankie Avalon | 1 | December 28 | 9 |
| December 14 | "It's Time to Cry" | Paul Anka | 4 | December 28 | 5 |
| December 14 | "The Big Hurt" | Miss Toni Fisher | 3 | December 28 | 8 |
| December 21 | "Among My Souvenirs" | Connie Francis | 7 | December 28 | 5 |
| December 21 | "Hound Dog Man" | Fabian | 9 | December 28 | 2 |

=== 1958 peaks ===
List of Billboard Hot 100 top ten singles in 1959 which peaked in 1958
| Top ten entry date | Single | Artist(s) | Peak | Peak date | Weeks in top ten |
|---|---|---|---|---|---|
| October 20 | "Tom Dooley" | The Kingston Trio | 1 | November 17 | 12 |
| November 10 | "To Know Him Is to Love Him" | The Teddy Bears | 1 | December 1 | 11 |
| November 17 | "Lonesome Town" | Ricky Nelson | 7 | December 1 | 8 |
| November 24 | "One Night" | Elvis Presley | 4 | December 15 | 8 |
| December 1 | "Problems" | The Everly Brothers | 2 | December 15 | 7 |
| December 15 | "The Chipmunk Song (Christmas Don't Be Late)" | The Chipmunks with David Seville | 1 | December 22 | 6 |

=== 1960 peaks ===
List of Billboard Hot 100 top ten singles in 1959 which peaked in 1960
| Top ten entry date | Single | Artist(s) | Peak | Peak date | Weeks in top ten |
|---|---|---|---|---|---|
| December 21 | "El Paso" | Marty Robbins | 1 | January 4 | 9 |
| December 21 | "Way Down Yonder in New Orleans" | Freddy Cannon | 3 | January 11 | 7 |
| December 28 | "Pretty Blue Eyes" | Steve Lawrence | 9 | January 4 | 6 |

== See also ==
- 1959 in music
- List of Billboard Hot 100 number ones of 1959
- Billboard Year-End Hot 100 singles of 1959
