= Billboard Year-End Hot 100 singles of 1959 =

Ranking of recorded music

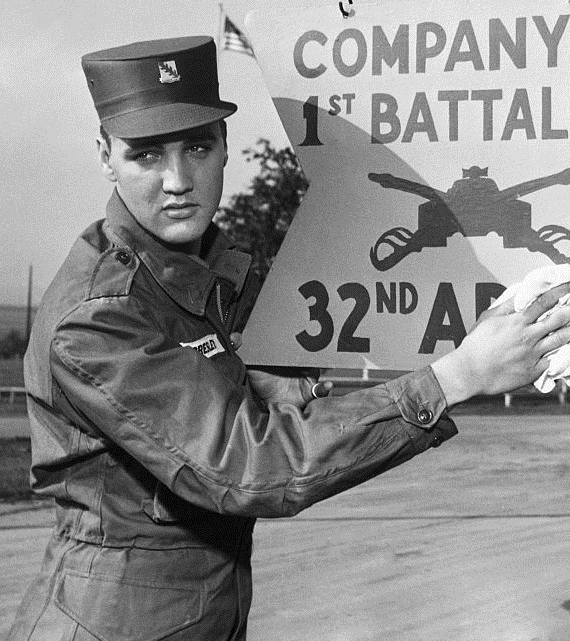
Elvis Presley had four songs on the Year-End Hot 100.

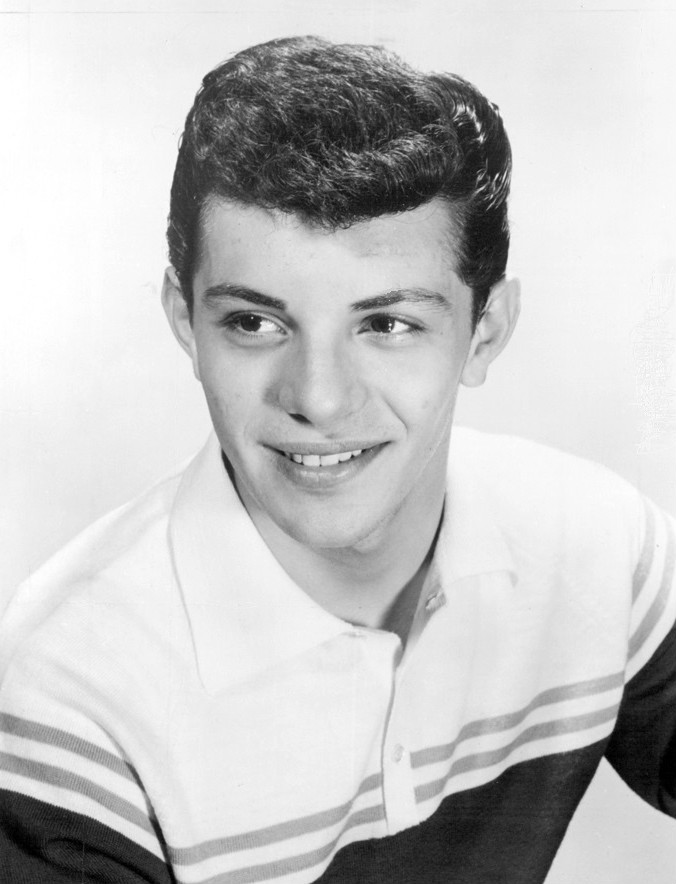
Frankie Avalon had four songs on the Year-End Hot 100.

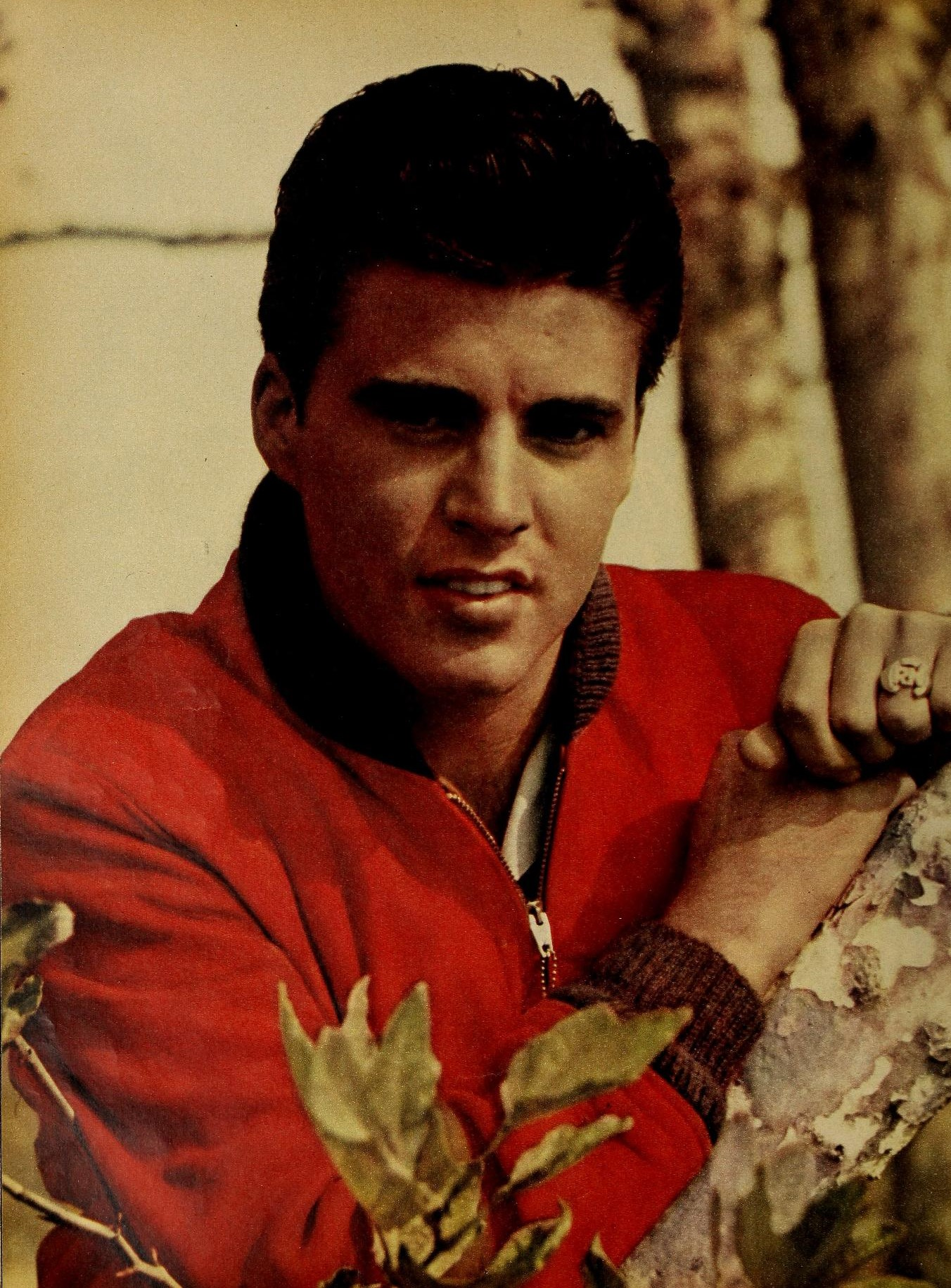
Ricky Nelson had four songs on the Year-End Hot 100.

This is a list of Billboard magazine's Top Hot 100 songs of 1959. The Top 100, as revealed in the year-end edition of Billboard dated December 14, 1959, is based on Hot 100 charts from the issue dates of January through November 1959.

| No. | Title | Artist(s) |
|---|---|---|
| 1 | "The Battle of New Orleans" | Johnny Horton |
| 2 | "Mack the Knife" | Bobby Darin |
| 3 | "Personality" | Lloyd Price |
| 4 | "Venus" | Frankie Avalon |
| 5 | "Lonely Boy" | Paul Anka |
| 6 | "Dream Lover" | Bobby Darin |
| 7 | "The Three Bells" | The Browns |
| 8 | "Come Softly to Me" | The Fleetwoods |
| 9 | "Kansas City" | Wilbert Harrison |
| 10 | "Mr. Blue" | The Fleetwoods |
| 11 | "Sleep Walk" | Santo & Johnny |
| 12 | "Put Your Head on My Shoulder" | Paul Anka |
| 13 | "Stagger Lee" | Lloyd Price |
| 14 | "Donna" | Ritchie Valens |
| 15 | "Pink Shoe Laces" | Dodie Stevens |
| 16 | "Smoke Gets in Your Eyes" | The Platters |
| 17 | "Charlie Brown" | The Coasters |
| 18 | "Quiet Village" | Martin Denny |
| 19 | "My Heart Is an Open Book" | Carl Dobkins Jr. |
| 20 | "(Till) I Kissed You" | The Everly Brothers |
| 21 | "Sea of Love" | Phil Phillips |
| 22 | "The Happy Organ" | Dave Cortez |
| 23 | "I'm Gonna Get Married" | Lloyd Price |
| 24 | "Sorry (I Ran All the Way Home)" | The Impalas |
| 25 | "A Teenager in Love" | Dion and the Belmonts |
| 26 | "16 Candles" | The Crests |
| 27 | "It's Just a Matter of Time" | Brook Benton |
| 28 | "Lipstick on Your Collar" | Connie Francis |
| 29 | "There Goes My Baby" | The Drifters |
| 30 | "A Big Hunk o' Love" | Elvis Presley |
| 31 | "Red River Rock" | Johnny and the Hurricanes |
| 32 | "Waterloo" | Stonewall Jackson |
| 33 | "Lavender Blue" | Sammy Turner |
| 34 | "(Now and Then There's) A Fool Such as I" | Elvis Presley |
| 35 | "Guitar Boogie Shuffle" | The Virtues |
| 36 | "Teen Beat" | Sandy Nelson |
| 37 | "Kookie, Kookie (Lend Me Your Comb)" | Edd Byrnes & Connie Stevens |
| 38 | "Tragedy" | Thomas Wayne |
| 39 | "My Happiness" | Connie Francis |
| 40 | "Tallahassee Lassie" | Freddy Cannon |
| 41 | "Tiger" | Fabian |
| 42 | "Never Be Anyone Else But You" | Ricky Nelson |
| 43 | "Don't You Know?" | Della Reese |
| 44 | "I Need Your Love Tonight" | Elvis Presley |
| 45 | "What a Diff'rence a Day Makes" | Dinah Washington |
| 46 | "The All American Boy" | Bobby Bare |
| 47 | "Primrose Lane" | Jerry Wallace |
| 48 | "Alvin's Harmonica" | The Chipmunks |
| 49 | "Lonely Street" | Andy Williams |
| 50 | "What'd I Say" | Ray Charles |
| 51 | "Broken Hearted Melody" | Sarah Vaughan |
| 52 | "Only You (And You Alone)" | Franck Pourcel |
| 53 | "Gotta Travel On" | Billy Grammer |
| 54 | "Poison Ivy" | The Coasters |
| 55 | "Turn Me Loose" | Fabian |
| 56 | "Lonely Teardrops" | Jackie Wilson |
| 57 | "Hawaiian Wedding Song" | Andy Williams |
| 58 | "Forty Miles of Bad Road" | Duane Eddy |
| 59 | "Just Ask Your Heart" | Frankie Avalon |
| 60 | "Tell Him No" | Travis and Bob |
| 61 | "Frankie" | Connie Francis |
| 62 | "I've Had It" | The Bell Notes |
| 63 | "I Cried a Tear" | LaVern Baker |
| 64 | "Enchanted" | The Platters |
| 65 | "Since I Don't Have You" | The Skyliners |
| 66 | "Peter Gunn Theme" | Ray Anthony |
| 67 | "The Chipmunk Song (Christmas Don't Be Late)" | The Chipmunks |
| 68 | "I Want to Walk You Home" | Fats Domino |
| 69 | "So Fine" | The Fiestas |
| 70 | "Bobby Sox to Stockings" | Frankie Avalon |
| 71 | "The Deck of Cards" | Wink Martindale |
| 72 | "A Lover's Question" | Clyde McPhatter |
| 73 | "I Only Have Eyes for You" | The Flamingos |
| 74 | "It's Late" | Ricky Nelson |
| 75 | "Petite Fleur" | Chris Barber's Jazz Band |
| 76 | "Tall Paul" | Annette Funicello |
| 77 | "The Tijuana Jail" | The Kingston Trio |
| 78 | "Just a Little Too Much" | Ricky Nelson |
| 79 | "Goodbye Baby" | Jack Scott |
| 80 | "Along Came Jones" | The Coasters |
| 81 | "Three Stars" | Tommy Dee & Carol Kay |
| 82 | "A Boy Without a Girl" | Frankie Avalon |
| 83 | "Sweeter Than You" | Ricky Nelson |
| 84 | "It Was I" | Skip & Flip |
| 85 | "Goodbye Jimmy, Goodbye" | Kathy Linden |
| 86 | "Manhattan Spiritual" | Reg Owen Orchestra |
| 87 | "Endlessly" | Brook Benton |
| 88 | "Heartaches by the Number" | Guy Mitchell |
| 89 | "Sea Cruise" | Frankie Ford |
| 90 | "That's Why (I Love You So)" | Jackie Wilson |
| 91 | "You're So Fine" | The Falcons |
| 92 | "Kissin' Time" | Bobby Rydell |
| 93 | "My Wish Came True" | Elvis Presley |
| 94 | "Morgen" | Ivo Robić |
| 95 | "Baby Talk" | Jan and Dean |
| 96 | "Take a Message to Mary" | The Everly Brothers |
| 97 | "The Battle Hymn of the Republic" | Mormon Tabernacle Choir |
| 98 | "Bongo Rock" | Preston Epps |
| 99 | "In the Mood" | Ernie Fields |
| 100 | "Seven Little Girls Sitting in the Back Seat" | Paul Evans |

== See also ==
- 1959 in music
- List of Billboard number-one singles of 1959
- List of Billboard Hot 100 top-ten singles in 1959
