= Frankie Avalon discography =

- Studio albums: 7
- Compilation albums: 1
- Singles: 41

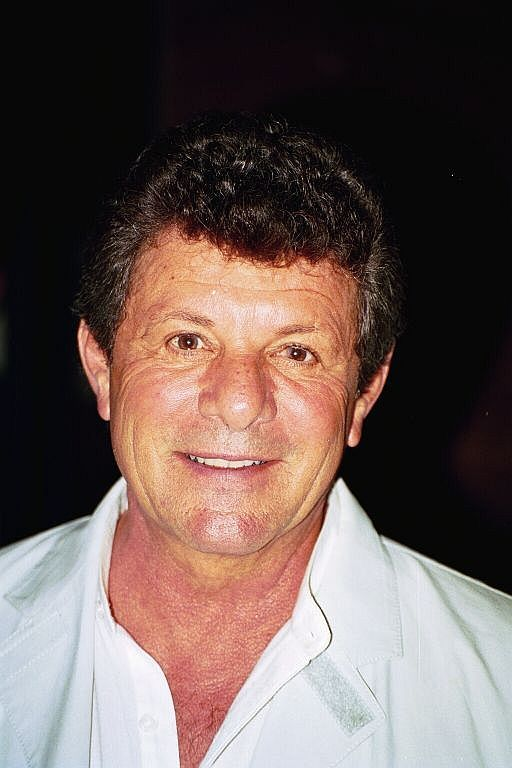
A picture of Frankie Avalon

Frankie Avalon is an American singer-songwriter. His discography consists of 14 albums and 41 singles.

== Albums ==
Year	Album	US 200	Record label
1958	Frankie Avalon	–	Chancellor Records
1959	Swingin' on a Rainbow	9	Chancellor Records
1959	The Young Frankie Avalon	–	Chancellor Records
1960	Summer Scene	–	Chancellor Records
1961	...And Now About Mr. Avalon	–	Chancellor Records
1961	A Whole Lotta Frankie	59	Chancellor Records
1962	Italiano	–	Chancellor Records
1962	You Are Mine	–	Chancellor Records
1962	Frankie Avalon's Christmas Album	–	Chancellor Records
1964	Muscle Beach Party	–	United Artists
1970	I Want You Near Me	–	Metromedia Records
1976	Venus	–	De-Lite Records
1977	You're My Life	–	De-Lite Records
1979	Today	–	Koala
2002	25 All-Time-Greatest Hits	–	Varèse Sarabande
"–" denotes releases that did not chart or were not released in that territory.

== Singles ==
Year	Titles (A-side, B-side) Both sides from same album except where indicated	Peak chart positions					Record label	Album
Year	Titles (A-side, B-side) Both sides from same album except where indicated	US	US CB	US AC	US R&B	UK	Record label	Album
1954	"Trumpet Sorrento" b/w "The Book"	–	42	–	–	–	X Records	Non-album tracks
1954	"Trumpet Tarantella" b/w "Dormi Dormi"	–	–	–	–	–	X Records	Non-album tracks
1957	"Cupid" b/w "Jivin' with the Saints"	–	–	–	–	–	Chancellor Records	Non-album tracks
1957	"Teacher's Pet" b/w "Shy Guy"	–	–	–	–	–	Chancellor Records	Non-album tracks
1957	"DeDe Dinah" b/w "Ooh La La" (Non-album track)	7	11	–	8	–	Chancellor Records	Frankie Avalon
1958	"You Excite Me" b/w "Darlin'"	49	44	–	–	–	Chancellor Records	Non-album tracks
1958	"Ginger Bread" b/w "Blue Betty" (Non-album track)	9	17	–	10	30	Chancellor Records	A Whole Lotta Frankie
1958	"What Little Girl" / "I'll Wait For You" (from The Hit Makers)	79; 15	– 25	– –	– –	– –	Chancellor Records	Non-album track
1959	"Venus" b/w "I'm Broke" (Non-album track)	1	1	–	10	16	Chancellor Records	The Hit Makers
1959	"Bobby Sox to Stockings" / "A Boy Without a Girl"	8; 10	7; 17	– –	26 –	– –	Chancellor Records	The Hit Makers
1959	"Just Ask Your Heart" / "Two Fools" (from A Whole Lotta Frankie)	7; 54	10; 51	–	–	–	Chancellor Records	The Hit Makers
1959	"Why" / "Swingin' on a Rainbow" (from Swingin' on a Rainbow)	1; 39	1; 87	– –	6 –	20 –	Chancellor Records	The Hit Makers
1960	"Don't Throw Away All Those Teardrops" b/w "Talk Talk Talk" (from Swingin' on a Rainbow)	22	19	–	–	37	Chancellor Records	A Whole Lotta Frankie
1960	"Where Are You" / "Tuxedo Junction"	32; 82	25; 69	– –	– –	– –	Chancellor Records	A Whole Lotta Frankie
1960	"Togetherness" / "Don't Let Love Pass Me By"	26; 85	26 –	– –	– –	– –	Chancellor Records	A Whole Lotta Frankie
1960	"The Puppet Song" / "A Perfect Love" (from A Whole Lotta Frankie)	56; 47	72; 68	– –	– –	– –	Chancellor Records	16 Greatest Hits
1961	"All of Everything" / "Call Me Anytime"	70; 102	77 –	– –	– –	– –	Chancellor Records	A Whole Lotta Frankie
1961	"Who Else but You" b/w "Gotta Get a Girl" (Non-album track)	82	76	–	–	–	Chancellor Records	15 Greatest Hits
1961	"Voyage to the Bottom of the Sea" b/w "The Summer of '61"	101 –	– –	– –	– –	– –	Chancellor Records	Non-album tracks
1961	"Married" / "True, True Love"	112; 90	– –	– –	– –	– –	Chancellor Records	Non-album tracks
1961	"Sleeping Beauty" b/w "The Lonely Bit" (from "...And Now, About Mr. Avalon")	–	–	–	–	–	Chancellor Records	Non-album tracks
1962	"After You've Gone" b/w "If You Don't Think I'm Leaving"	117 –	– –	– –	– –	– –	Chancellor Records	Non-album tracks
1962	"You Are Mine" b/w "Italiano" (from Italiano)	26	36	7	–	–	Chancellor Records	16 Greatest Hits
1962	"A Miracle" / "Don't Let Me Stand in Your Way"	75 111	99 –	– –	– –	– –	Chancellor Records	Non-album tracks
1962	"Welcome Home" b/w "Dance the Bossa Nova"	129	–	–	–	–	Chancellor Records	Non-album tracks
1963	"My Ex-Best Friend" b/w "First Love Never Dies"	–	–	–	–	–	Chancellor Records	Non-album tracks
1963	"Heartbeats" b/w "Cleopatra"	– –	– –	– –	– –	– –	Chancellor Records	Non-album tracks
1963	"Beach Party" b/w "Don't Stop Now"	–	–	–	–	–	Chancellor Records	Muscle Beach Party and Other Motion Picture Songs
1964	"Don't Make Fun of Me" b/w "Again" (from Muscle Beach Party)	–	–	–	–	–	United Artists Records	15 Greatest Hits
1964	"Here to Stay" b/w "New Fangled Jingle Jangle Swimming Suit from Paris"	– –	– –	– –	– –	– –	United Artists Records	Non-album tracks
1964	"Every Girl Should Get Married" b/w "Moon River" (from Muscle Beach Party)	–	–	–	–	–	United Artists Records	Non-album tracks
1965	"I'll Take Sweden" b/w "There'll Be Rainbows Again"	–	–	–	–	–	United Artists Records	Non-album tracks
1968	"Dancing on the Stars" b/w "But I Do"	–	–	–	–	–	Reprise Records	Non-album tracks
1968	"It's Over" b/w "Don't You Do It"	–	–	–	–	–	Reprise Records	Non-album tracks
1969	"For Your Love" b/w "Why Don't They Understand"	–	–	–	–	–	Reprise Records	Non-album tracks
1969	"The Star" b/w "Woman Cryin'"	–	–	–	–	–	Amos Records	Non-album tracks
1970	"Come on Back to Me Baby" b/w "Empty"	–	–	–	–	–	Metromedia Records	Non-album tracks
1970	"I Want You Near Me" b/w "Heart of Everything"	–	–	–	–	–	Metromedia Records	Non-album tracks
1976	"Thank You for That Extra Sunrise" b/w "It's His Game"	–	–	–	–	–	De-Lite Records	Venus
1976	"Venus" (Re-recording) b/w "Venus" (Disco version)	46	32	1	–	–	De-Lite Records	Venus
1977	"Splish Splash" b/w "When I Said I Loved You" (from Venus)	–	–	–	–	–	De-Lite Records	Non-album tracks
1977	"Roses Grow Beyond the Wall (There Are Other World's [sic] to Sing In)" b/w "Midnight Lady"	–	–	–	–	–	De-Lite Records	Non-album tracks
1978	"Beauty School Dropout" b/w "Midnight Lady"	–	–	–	–	–	De-Lite Records	Grease
1983	"You're The Miracle" b/w "You're The Miracle (Instrumental)"	–	–	–	–	–	Bobcat Records	Non-album tracks
1984	"Innocent" b/w "Innocent"	–	–	–	–	–	Memo Records	Non-album tracks
"–" denotes releases that did not chart or were not released in that territory.
