= List of number-one singles of 1959 (Canada) =

The following is a list of the CHUM Chart number-one singles of 1959.

Issue date	Song	Artist	Reference
January 5	"The Chipmunk Song"	The Chipmunks	
January 12	"Smoke Gets in Your Eyes"	The Platters	
January 19	"Smoke Gets in Your Eyes"	The Platters	
January 26	"Smoke Gets in Your Eyes"	The Platters	
February 2	"Donna" / "La Bamba"	Ritchie Valens	
February 9	"Donna" / "La Bamba"	Ritchie Valens	
February 16	"Donna" / "La Bamba"	Ritchie Valens	
February 23	"Donna" / "La Bamba"	Ritchie Valens	
March 2	"Alvin's Harmonica"	The Chipmunks	
March 9	"Charlie Brown"	The Coasters	
March 16	"Venus"	Frankie Avalon	
March 23	"Venus"	Frankie Avalon	
March 30	"It Doesn't Matter Anymore"	Buddy Holly	
April 6	"Come Softly to Me"	The Fleetwoods	
April 13	"(Now and Then There's) A Fool Such as I" / "I Need Your Love Tonight"	Elvis Presley	
April 20	"(Now and Then There's) A Fool Such as I" / "I Need Your Love Tonight"	Elvis Presley	
April 27	"(Now and Then There's) A Fool Such as I" / "I Need Your Love Tonight"	Elvis Presley	
May 4	"Tell Him No"	Travis and Bob	
May 11	"Kansas City"	Wilbert Harrison	
May 18	"Kansas City"	Wilbert Harrison	
May 25	"Kansas City"	Wilbert Harrison	
June 1	"The Battle of New Orleans"	Johnny Horton	
June 8	"The Battle of New Orleans"	Johnny Horton	
June 15	"The Battle of New Orleans"	Johnny Horton	
June 22	"The Battle of New Orleans"	Johnny Horton	
June 29	"The Battle of New Orleans"	Johnny Horton	
July 6	"The Battle of New Orleans"	Johnny Horton	
July 13	"The Battle of New Orleans"	Johnny Horton	
July 20	"A Big Hunk o' Love"	Elvis Presley	
July 27	"A Big Hunk o' Love"	Elvis Presley	
August 3	"A Big Hunk o' Love"	Elvis Presley	
August 10	"A Big Hunk o' Love"	Elvis Presley	
August 17	"The Three Bells"	The Browns	
August 24	"The Three Bells"	The Browns	
August 31	"The Three Bells"	The Browns	
September 7	"Sea of Love"	Phil Phillips & the Twilights	
September 14	"Sea of Love"	Phil Phillips & the Twilights	
September 21	"Sea of Love"	Phil Phillips & the Twilights	
September 28	"Morgen"	Ivo Robić	
October 5	"Morgen"	Ivo Robić	
October 12	"Mack the Knife"	Bobby Darin	
October 19	"Mack the Knife"	Bobby Darin	
October 26	"Mr. Blue"	The Fleetwoods	
November 2	"Mr. Blue"	The Fleetwoods	
November 9	"Mr. Blue"	The Fleetwoods	
November 16	"Mr. Blue"	The Fleetwoods	
November 23	"Heartaches by the Number"	Guy Mitchell	
November 30	"Heartaches by the Number"	Guy Mitchell	
December 7	"Heartaches by the Number"	Guy Mitchell	
December 14	"El Paso"	Marty Robbins	
December 21	"El Paso"	Marty Robbins	
December 28	"El Paso"	Marty Robbins	

== See also ==
- 1959 in music
