= Cleopatra (disambiguation) =

Cleopatra (69–30 BC) was the last active Ptolemaic ruler of Egypt before it became a Roman province.

Cleopatra may also refer to:

== Given name ==
- Cleopatra (given name), a list of people and fictional characters
- Cleopatra (Greek singer) (born 1963), who represented Greece in the 1992 Eurovision Song Contest
- Cleopatra (mythology), several figures from Greek mythology, including:
  - Cleopatra (Danaid), two of the Danaïdes
  - Cleopatra (daughter of Idas), the wife of Meleager, a participant in the Calydonian boar hunt
- Various other probably related rulers, co-rulers, or wives of rulers of Egypt, including:
  - Cleopatra I Syra
  - Cleopatra II
  - Cleopatra III
  - Cleopatra IV
  - Cleopatra V
  - Cleopatra VI

== Arts and entertainment ==
=== Film ===
- Cleopatra (1912 film), an American silent film
- Cleopatra (1917 film), an American silent film
- Cleopatra (1928 film), an American silent short film
- Cleopatra (1934 film), an American film by Cecil B. DeMille
- Cleopatra (1963 film), an American film by Joseph L. Mankiewicz starring Elizabeth Taylor and Richard Burton
- Cleopatra (1970 film), a Japanese anime film
- Cleopatra (2003 film), an Argentine film
- Cleopatra (2005 film), an Indian Tamil-language film
- Cleopatra (2007 film), a Brazilian film by Júlio Bressane
- Cleopatra (2013 film), an Indian Malayalam-language film
- Foxxy Cleopatra, a major character in the 2002 film Austin Powers in Goldmember

=== Literature ===
- Cleopatra (Haggard novel) (1889)
- Cleopatra (Gardner novel), 1962, by Jeffrey K. Gardner
- La Cleopatra (poem), an epic poem by Girolamo Graziani
- Cleopatra (Roller book), a 2010 nonfiction book by Duane W. Roller
- The title character of Cleopatra in Space, an American graphic novel series for children by Mike Maihack

=== Classical music ===
- Cleopatra (Cimarosa), a 1789 opera seria by Domenico Cimarosa
- Cleopatra (Rossi), an 1876 opera by Lauro Rossi
- Cleopatra, an opera by Johann Mattheson
- Cleopatra, a composition by Luigi Mancinelli
- Cleopatra, a symphonic poem by George Whitefield Chadwick

=== Popular music ===
==== Albums ====
- Cleopatra (album), 2016, by The Lumineers
- Cleopatra (1963 soundtrack), by Alex North
- Cleopatra, a 2004 album by Isabel Bayrakdarian
- Handel: Cleopatra, a 2011 album by Natalie Dessay

==== Songs ====
- "Cleopatra" (Frankie Avalon song) (1963)
- "Cleopatra" (Jerome Kern song) (1917)
- "Cleopatra" (Samira Efendi song), Azerbaijan's 2020 Eurovision song submission
- "Cleopatra" (The Lumineers song) (2016)
- "Cleopatra" (Weezer song) (2014)
- "Cleopatra (I've Got to Get You Off My Mind)", a song by The Tennors
- "Cleopatra", a song by Adam and the Ants from their 1979 album Dirk Wears White Sox
- "Cleopatra", a song by Nico Fidenco
- "Cleopatra", a song by David Vendetta
- "Cleopatra", a song by Train from AM Gold, 2022
- "Cleopatra", a song by Chris Duarte from Tailspin Headwhack, 1997

==== Other uses in popular music ====
- Cleopatra Records, an American record label
- Cleopatra (group), a British girl group

=== Paintings ===
- Cleopatra (Artemisia Gentileschi, Ferrara), by Artemisia Gentileschi, c. 1620
- Cleopatra (Artemisia Gentileschi, Milan), by Artemisia Gentileschi, 1613 or 1621–1622
- Cleopatra (Artemisia Gentileschi, Rome), by Artemisia Gentileschi, c. 1633–5

=== Television ===
- Cleopatra (miniseries), a 1999 American miniseries produced by Hallmark Entertainment
- Cleopatra 2525, an American science fiction television series
- The Cleopatras, a 1983 British series

== Places ==
- Cleopatra (neighborhood), a neighborhood of Alexandria, Egypt
- Cleopatra, Kentucky, US, an unincorporated community
- Cleopatra, Missouri, US, an unincorporated community
- Cleopatra (crater), an impact crater on Venus

== Plants and animals ==
- Cleopatra (horse), an American racehorse
- Cleopatra (gastropod), a genus of freshwater snails
- Gonepteryx cleopatra or cleopatra, a species of butterfly
- Neoguillauminia cleopatra, a species of tree from New Caledonia

== Ships ==
- HMS Cleopatra, various Royal Navy ships
- Cleopatra (1839), an East India Company paddle frigate built in 1839 and sunk by a tropical cyclone in 1847
- Cleopatra (cylinder ship), a vessel constructed to convey Cleopatra's Needle from Alexandria to London in 1877
- SS Mohegan, originally named Cleopatra, a mixed passenger liner and animal carrier which sank in 1898
- SS United Victory, a World War II Victory cargo ship renamed Cleopatra in 1956

== Other uses ==
- Cleopatra (cigarette), an Egyptian brand

== See also ==
- Cleopatra Algemene Studentenvereniging Groningen, a student association in Groningen, the Netherlands
- Cleopatra's Needle, a pair of Egyptian obelisks
- Kleopatra (disambiguation)
