= Cléopâtre (disambiguation) =

Cléopâtre is an opera by Jules Massenet which premiered in 1914.

Cléopâtre may also refer to:

- "Cléopâtre" (ballet), a 1908 ballet by Mikhail Fokine
- Cléopâtre (1899 film), a French short film by Georges Méliès
- French ship Cléopâtre, three frigates

== See also ==
- Cleopatra (disambiguation)
- Kleopatra (disambiguation)
