= You Are Mine =

Single by Frankie Avalon
- B-side: "Ponchinello"/"Italiano"
- Released: March 17, 1962
- Genre: Pop
- Length: 2:55
- Label: Chancellor Records 1107
- Songwriter(s): Bob Marcucci, Peter De Angelis
- Producer(s): Don Costa

Frankie Avalon singles chronology
"After You've Gone" (1962)	"You Are Mine" (1962)	"A Miracle" (1962)

"You are Mine" is a song written by Bob Marcucci and Peter De Angelis and performed by Frankie Avalon. The song reached #7 on the adult contemporary chart and #26 on the Billboard Top 100 in 1962.

The song was produced and arranged by Don Costa.

== Other versions ==
- Buddy Greco originally released a version as a single in August 1957.
