= I've Had It =

I've Had It may refer to:

== Books ==
- I've Had It, wartime memoir by Beirne Lay, Jr. 1945

== Music ==
- I've Had It: The Very Best of the Bell Notes, compilation album The Bell Notes 1998

=== Podcasts ===
- I've Had It, podcast hosted by Jennifer Welch and Angie "Pumps" Sullivan

=== Songs ===
- "I've Had It" (The Bell Notes song), 1958
- "I've Had It", song by Aimee Mann, Mann, from Whatever (Aimee Mann album) 1993
- "I've Had It", song by Black Flag, G. Ginn from Nervous Breakdown (EP) 1979
- "I've Had It", song by George Smith (musician) B. Benjamin, S. Marcus 1965
- "I've Had It", song by Lee Andrews And The Hearts Andrews, Jackson, Bell 1968
- "I've Had It", song by The Shirts Ronald Ardito 1980
- "I've Had It", song by Danielle Brisebois from Portable Life 1999
