= Palette Records =

Record label

- Parent company: World Music (until 1989)
- Founded: 1958
- Founder: Jacques Kluger
- Status: Defunct
- Distributor(s): Pye Records (UK)
- Genre: Various
- Country of origin: Belgium

Palette Records was an independent record label, founded in Belgium in 1958 by Jacques Kluger. It was linked to the publishing company World Music, which was taken over by BMG in 1989.

The British Palette label was distributed by Pye Records. Artists included the comedian Tommy Cooper, who had a minor hit with "Don't Jump off the Roof, Dad", Monty Babson, and the Reg Owen Orchestra, whose single "Manhattan Spiritual" reached #10 on the U.S. pop chart in 1959.

== Artists ==
- Tommy Cooper
- Reg Owen
- Monty Babson
- Will Tura
- Rita Deneve
- Jess and James
- Los Mayas
- Andre Brasseur
- The Mertens Brothers

== See also ==
- Lists of record labels
