= DeDe Dinah =

Single by Frankie Avalon

from the album Frankie Avalon
- B-side: "Ooh La La"
- Released: December 23, 1957
- Genre: Pop
- Length: 2:08
- Label: Chancellor Records 1011
- Songwriters: Peter De Angelis, Bob Marcucci
- Producer: Peter De Angelis

Frankie Avalon singles chronology
"Teacher's Pet" (1957)	"DeDe Dinah" (1957)	"You Excite Me" (1958)

"DeDe Dinah" is a song written by Peter De Angelis and Bob Marcucci and performed by Frankie Avalon. The song reached #7 on the Billboard Top 100 and #8 on the R&B chart in 1958. The song appeared on his 1958 album, Frankie Avalon.

The song was produced by Peter De Angelis and arranged by Al Caiola.

== In media ==
- The final The Dick Clark Show on September 10, 1960 featured a highlight of Avalon performing the song.
- The song is mentioned in the 1974 Reunion song, "Life Is a Rock (But the Radio Rolled Me)".
