= I'll Wait for You (Frankie Avalon song) =

Single by Frankie Avalon
- A-side: "What Little Girl"
- Released: September 22, 1958
- Genre: Pop
- Length: 2:49
- Label: Chancellor Records 1026
- Songwriter(s): Peter De Angelis, Bob Marcucci
- Producer(s): Peter De Angelis

Frankie Avalon singles chronology
"Ginger Bread" (1958)	"I'll Wait for You" (1958)	"Venus" (1959)

"I'll Wait for You" is a song written by Peter De Angelis and Bob Marcucci and performed by Frankie Avalon. The song was arranged by Peter De Angelis.

== Chart performance ==
The song reached #15 on the Billboard Top 100 in 1958. The single's A-side, "What Little Girl", reached #79 on the Billboard Hot 100. The song was ranked #99 on Billboard magazine's Top Hot 100 songs of 1958.
