= Ginger Bread (song) =

Single by Frankie Avalon
- B-side: "Blue Betty"
- Released: June 23, 1958
- Genre: Pop
- Length: 2:05
- Label: Chancellor Records 1021
- Songwriter(s): Clint Ballard, Jr., Hank Hunter
- Producer(s): Peter De Angelis

Frankie Avalon singles chronology
"You Excite Me" (1958)	"Ginger Bread" (1958)	"What Little Girl" / "I'll Wait for You" (1958)

"Ginger Bread" is a song written by Clint Ballard, Jr. and Hank Hunter and performed by Frankie Avalon. The song reached #9 on the Billboard Top 100, #10 on the R&B chart, and #30 in the UK in 1958.

The song was arranged by Peter De Angelis. The backing vocals on the song was by the band The Four Dates.

The song was ranked #100 on Billboard magazine's Top Hot 100 songs of 1958.

== Other versions ==
- Rusty Draper released a version as the B-side to his single "By the Light of the Silvery Moon" in Australia in 1958.
- Johnny Worth released a version as the B-side to his single "Western Movies" in the UK in 1958.
