= André Brasseur =

Belgian keyboard player and organist

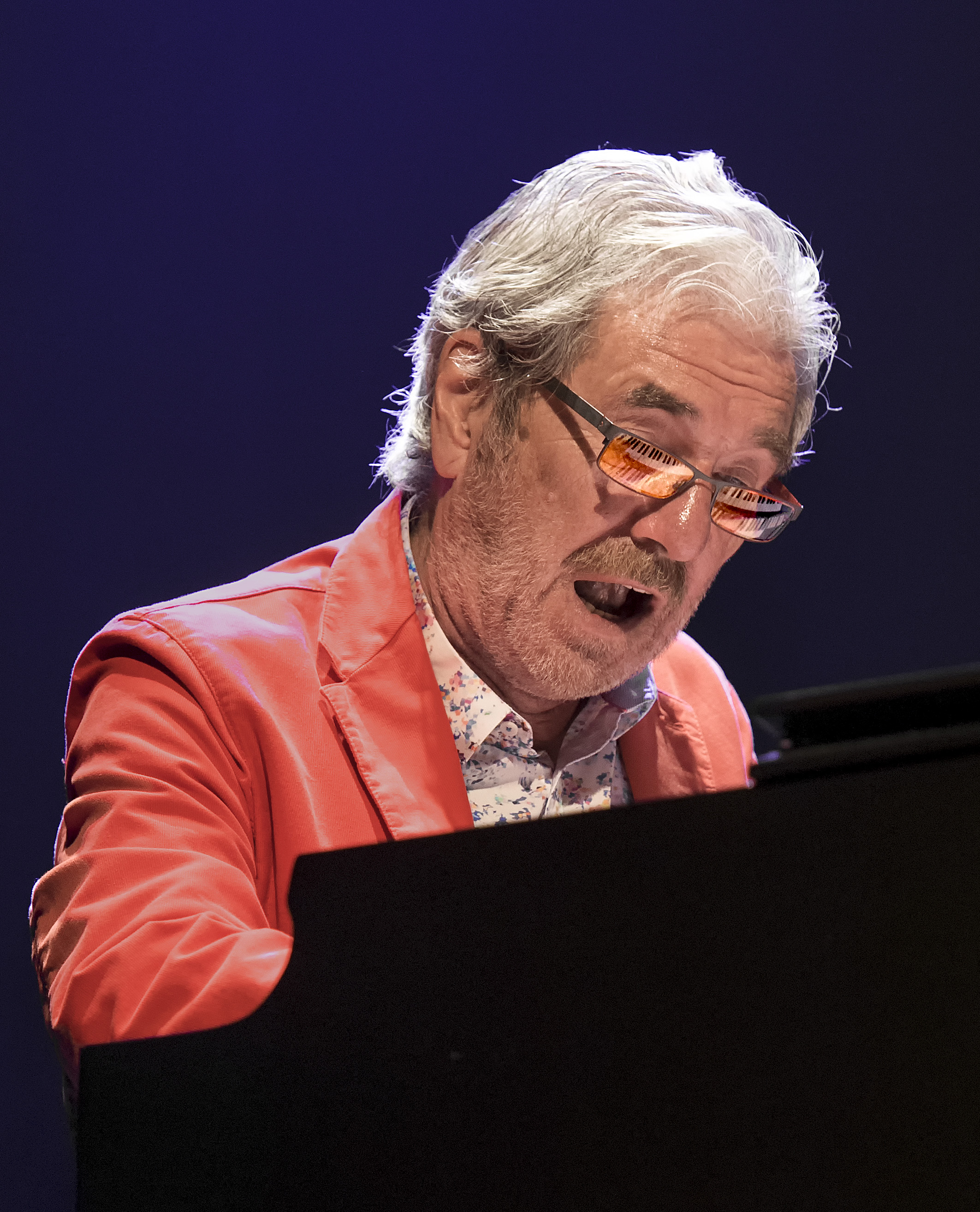
André Brasseur (2015)

André Emile Ghislain Brasseur (born 11 December 1939 (age 86)) is a Belgian keyboard player and organist. His most successful recording was "Early Bird" released in 1965.

== Career ==
Brasseur was playing in bars when he was signed in 1964, and started releasing albums and singles in his own country Belgium. His first single was unsuccessful, but his second, the 1965 instrumental single "Early Bird" (named after the Intelsat I satellite launched the same year), reached No. 1 in Flemish chart, and it also reached the top 10 in Germany and Austria. The recording was his most successful single and it has sold over 6 million copies worldwide. He followed it with "Atlantide"/"Studio 17" and "Mad Train", released under the name André Brasseur & His Multisound Organ.

Brasseur is best known in the United Kingdom for his double A-sided single The Kid/Holiday, which was released in Belgium in 1966 on Palette Records and in the UK in 1967 on the CBS label. Though it never reached the UK charts, The Kid became popular in the famous Northern Soul venue The Twisted Wheel, based in Manchester, and DJ Noel Edmonds used Holiday as the theme tune to his Radio 1 programme in the 1970s. In the same period at Radio Veronica, a Dutch pirate radio, DJ Lex Harding used The Kid as the opening sequence to his daily afternoon broadcast programme.

A commercially unreleased studio 'take' of The Kid was used for track 2 of the BBC2 Trade Test Music Tape 'Le Retour De- Borsalino' that was transmitted between 22nd of December 1975 and 1st of August 1977. His 1967 single Waiting For You was used as the signature tune to the 1970s Yorkshire Television series Indoor League.
