= Why (Frankie Avalon song) =

1959 single by Frankie Avalon

Single by Frankie Avalon
- B-side: "Swingin' on a Rainbow"
- Released: November 9, 1959
- Genre: Pop
- Length: 2:30
- Label: Chancellor 1045
- Songwriters: Peter De Angelis, Bob Marcucci

Frankie Avalon singles chronology
"Just Ask Your Heart" / "Two Fools" (1959)	"Why" (1959)	"Don't Throw Away All Those Teardrops" (1960)

"Why" is a hit song recorded by Frankie Avalon in 1959. It reached No. 1 on the U.S. Billboard Hot 100 chart published on the week of December 28, 1959. It was Avalon's second and final No. 1 hit.

The song was covered by Donny Osmond, and this version reached No. 3 on the UK Singles chart.

== Background ==
"Why" was written and produced by Avalon's manager and record producer Robert "Bob" Marcucci and Peter De Angelis. The melody is based on an Italian song. The Avalon version features an uncredited female singer (alleged to be Fran Lori), heard in the repeat of the first four lines of the first part of the song, with Avalon replying, "Yes, I love you". He concludes the last quarter of the song with a coda, by himself.

The song topped the U.S. Billboard Hot 100 chart for the week ending January 2, 1960, published on the week of December 28, 1959. making it the last No. 1 single of the 1950s, and the first No. 1 single of the 1960s at the same time. It also became the first No. 1 single of the 1960s on the Cashbox magazine charts.

Avalon could not take full advantage of the song's success because he was filming on location in Texas. His concentration on his acting career detracted from his recording career, and "Why" became Avalon's seventh and final top 10 hit.

== Charts ==
Chart (1959–1960)	Peak position
Belgium (Ultratop 50 Flanders)	11
Belgium (Ultratop 50 Wallonia)	18
Netherlands (Single Top 100)	11
Norway (VG-lista)	3
UK Singles (Official Charts)	20
US Billboard Hot 100	1

== Donny Osmond version ==
"Why"

Single by Donny Osmond

from the album Too Young
- B-side: "Lonely Boy"
- Released: August 12, 1972
- Recorded: 1972
- Genre: Pop
- Length: 2:44
- Label: MGM
- Songwriters: Peter De Angelis, Bob Marcucci
- Producers: Mike Curb, Don Costa

Donny Osmond singles chronology
"Too Young" (1972)	"Why" (1972)	"The Twelfth of Never" (1973)

Donny Osmond recorded "Why" in 1972, and it was released as a single from the album Too Young. It peaked at No. 3 in the United Kingdom. In the U.S., the song reached No. 13 on the Billboard Hot 100 and No. 19 on the Easy Listening chart. Osmond’s version also reached No. 13 in the New Zealand.

=== Charts ===
Chart (1972)	Peak position
New Zealand (Lever Hit Parade)	13
UK Singles (Official Charts)	3
US Billboard Hot 100	13
US Adult Contemporary (Billboard)	19

== Other versions ==
- The French cover by Dalida in 1960 became very popular as "Bras Dessus Bras Dessous". Instead of being featured on her 1960 album Les enfants du Pirée, it was released only on EP with three more songs that appeared on her following 1961 year album Garde-moi la dernière danse.
- Les Compagnons de la chanson also recorded the French version "Bras dessus, bras dessous", which reached No. 8 on the Belgian chart in 1960, and No. 6 in France, with high sales figure in the country.
- Anthony Newley covered the song shortly after Avalon, and his version went to No. 1 on the UK Singles Chart in February 1960.

== See also ==
- List of Hot 100 number-one singles of 1959 (U.S.)
- List of Cash Box Top 100 number-one singles of 1960
- List of number-one singles from the 1960s (UK)
