= Manhattan Spiritual =

Single by Reg Owen Orchestra

from the album Manhattan Spiritual
- B-side: "Ritual Blues"
- Released: November 5, 1958
- Genre: Big band
- Length: 2:44
- Label: Palette
- Songwriter(s): Billy Maxted

Reg Owen Orchestra singles chronology
"Car Hop" (1958)	"Manhattan Spiritual" (1958)	"Down by the Riverside" (1959)

"Manhattan Spiritual" is an instrumental musical piece written by Billy Maxted and first performed by the Reg Owen Orchestra. It reached #10 on the US pop chart and #20 on the UK Singles Chart in 1959. It was featured on their 1958 album Manhattan Spiritual.

The single ranked #86 on Billboard's Year-End Hot 100 singles of 1959.

== Other charting versions ==
- Sandy Nelson released a version of the song as a single in 1969 which reached #119 on the US pop chart.
- Mike Post released a version of the song as a single in 1975 which reached #28 on the US adult contemporary chart and #56 on the US pop chart.

== Other versions ==
- Francis Bay and His Orchestra released a version of the song as a single in the UK in 1958, but it did not chart.
- Joe Loco and His Orchestra released a version of the song on their 1959 album "Happy-Go-Loco".
- Henri René and His Orchestra released a version of the song on their 1969 album The Swinging 59.
- The Stargazers released a version of the song as the B-side to their 1960 UK single "Three Beautiful Words".
- Eric Delaney released a version of the song on his 1962 album At the London Palladium. He released it as a single in 1963, but it did not chart.
- Santo & Johnny released a version of the song as a single in 1963, but it did not chart.
- Joe Leahy released a version of the song as the B-side to his 1966 Canadian single "Gilligan".
- B. Bumble and the Stingers released a version of the song as the B-side to their 1972 UK single "Down at Mother's Place".
- Jack Parnell released a version of the song on his 1976 album The Big Band Show.
