= List of Billboard Hot 100 number ones of 1959 =

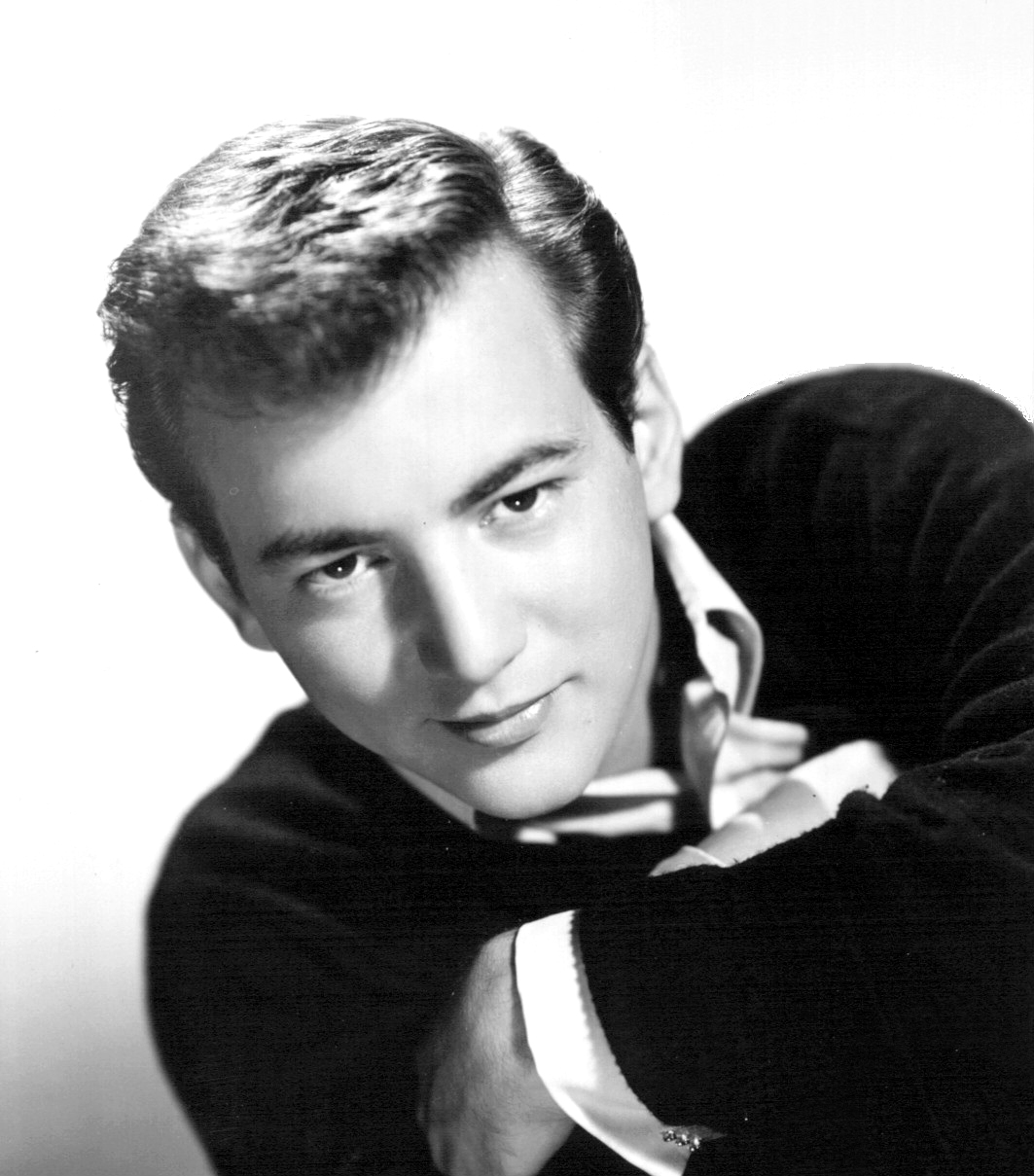
Bobby Darin spent nine weeks at number one in 1959, the most for any act.

The Billboard Hot 100 is a chart published since August 1958 by Billboard magazine which ranks the best-performing singles in the United States. In 1959, it was compiled based on a combination of sales and airplay data sourced from surveys of retail outlets and playlists submitted by radio stations respectively, and 16 different singles spent time at number one.

In the issue of Billboard dated January 5, the Chipmunks with David Seville were at number one with the Christmas-themed track "The Chipmunk Song", its third week in the top spot. The single remained at number one for a further week before being displaced by "Smoke Gets in Your Eyes" by the Platters in the issue dated January 19. Not until 2019 would another Christmas song top the Hot 100, although for much of the 1960s, 1970s, and 1980s holiday-themed songs were excluded from the chart. The Platters and Seville had not previously topped the Hot 100, but had achieved number ones on the separate pop music sales, airplay, and jukebox play charts which Billboard had published prior to the creation of the consolidated listing, as had Paul Anka, Elvis Presley, and Guy Mitchell. All of the other acts to reach number one during 1959 gained the first pop chart-toppers of their careers.

The Fleetwoods and Frankie Avalon were the only acts to have two number ones in 1959, but neither act topped the Hot 100 again. Bobby Darin spent nine non-consecutive weeks at number one in October and November with "Mack the Knife", making it the year's longest-running number one and Darin the act with the most weeks in the top spot. At the 2nd Annual Grammy Awards in November 1959, the song won the award for Record of the Year, but it would prove to be Darin's only number one on the Hot 100. In the first of its two spells atop the chart, "Mack the Knife" spent six weeks at number one, tying with "The Battle of New Orleans" by Johnny Horton for the year's longest unbroken run in the peak position. Horton's song won the awards for Best Country & Western Recording and Song of the Year at the same Grammy Awards ceremony (the latter presented to its writer, Jimmy Driftwood) and topped Billboard's Year-End Hot 100 singles chart, but it similarly proved to be the only pop number one for Horton, who died in a car accident in 1960. Avalon's second number one of 1959, "Why", was the year's final chart-topper.

== Chart history ==
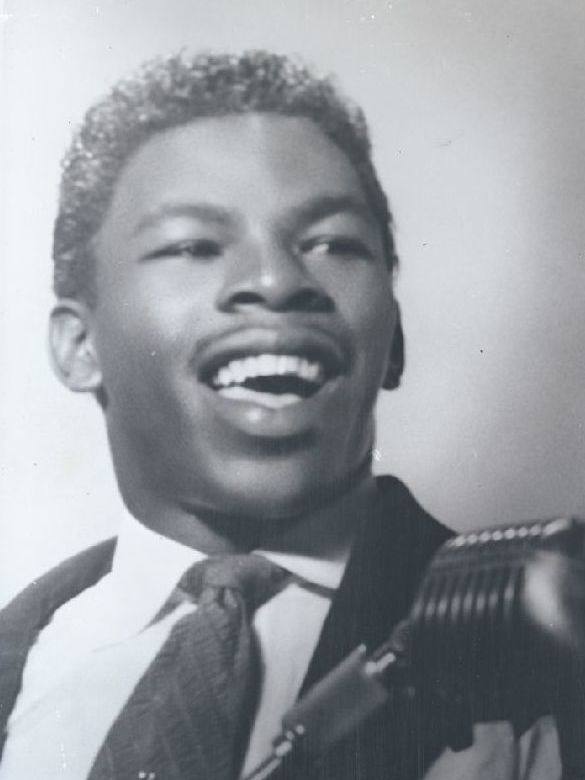
Lloyd Price spent four weeks at number one with his version of the traditional song "Stagger Lee".

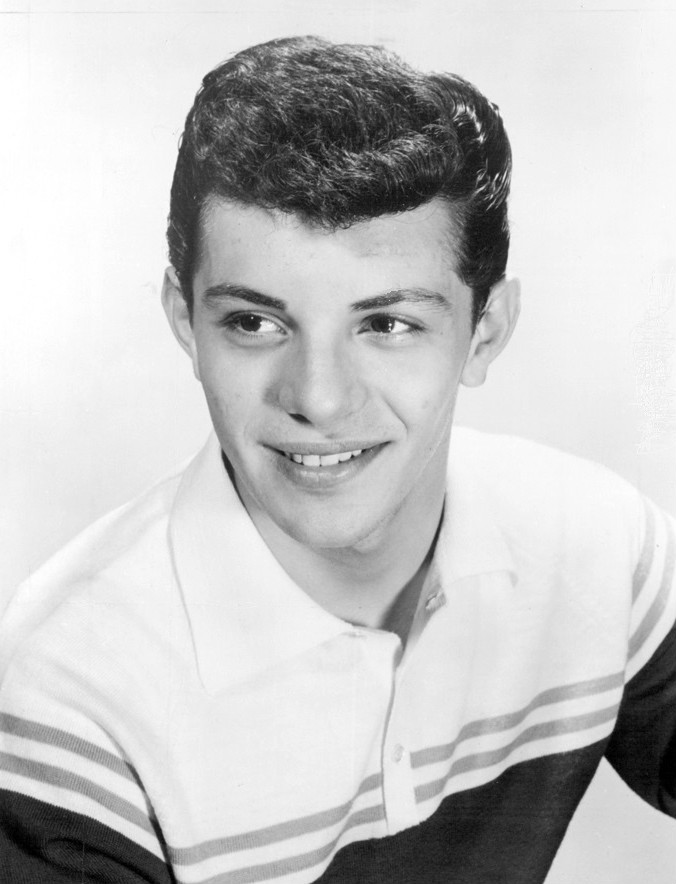
Frankie Avalon was one of only two acts to achieve two number ones in 1959.

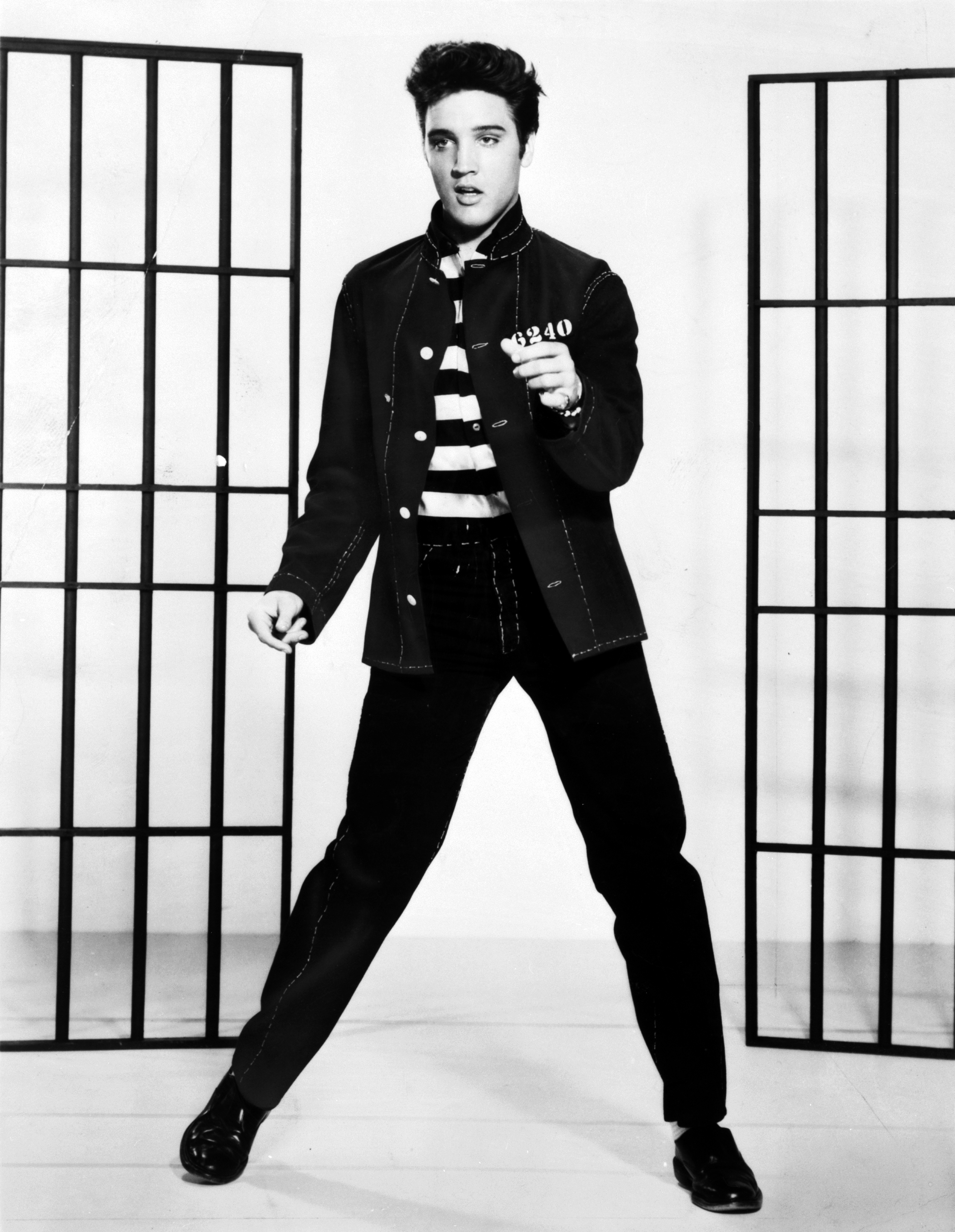
Elvis Presley topped the chart with "A Big Hunk o' Love".

Chart history
No. (Note: The "No." column indicates the numerical sequence of number ones in Hot 100 history. "Re" indicates a single returning to number one.)	Issue date	Title	Artist(s)	Ref.
8	January 5	"The Chipmunk Song"	The Chipmunks with David Seville	
8	January 12	"The Chipmunk Song"	The Chipmunks with David Seville	
9	January 19	"Smoke Gets in Your Eyes"	The Platters	
9	January 26	"Smoke Gets in Your Eyes"	The Platters	
9	February 2	"Smoke Gets in Your Eyes"	The Platters	
10	February 9	"Stagger Lee"	Lloyd Price	
10	February 16	"Stagger Lee"	Lloyd Price	
10	February 23	"Stagger Lee"	Lloyd Price	
10	March 2	"Stagger Lee"	Lloyd Price	
11	March 9	"Venus"	Frankie Avalon	
11	March 16	"Venus"	Frankie Avalon	
11	March 23	"Venus"	Frankie Avalon	
11	March 30	"Venus"	Frankie Avalon	
11	April 6	"Venus"	Frankie Avalon	
12	April 13	"Come Softly to Me"	The Fleetwoods	
12	April 20	"Come Softly to Me"	The Fleetwoods	
12	April 27	"Come Softly to Me"	The Fleetwoods	
12	May 4	"Come Softly to Me"	The Fleetwoods	
13	May 11	"The Happy Organ"	Dave "Baby" Cortez	
14	May 18	"Kansas City"	Wilbert Harrison	
14	May 25	"Kansas City"	Wilbert Harrison	
15	June 1	"The Battle of New Orleans"	Johnny Horton	
15	June 8	"The Battle of New Orleans"	Johnny Horton	
15	June 15	"The Battle of New Orleans"	Johnny Horton	
15	June 22	"The Battle of New Orleans"	Johnny Horton	
15	June 29	"The Battle of New Orleans"	Johnny Horton	
15	July 6	"The Battle of New Orleans"	Johnny Horton	
16	July 13	"Lonely Boy"	Paul Anka	
16	July 20	"Lonely Boy"	Paul Anka	
16	July 27	"Lonely Boy"	Paul Anka	
16	August 3	"Lonely Boy"	Paul Anka	
17	August 10	"A Big Hunk o' Love"	Elvis Presley	
17	August 17	"A Big Hunk o' Love"	Elvis Presley	
18	August 24	"The Three Bells"	The Browns	
18	August 31	"The Three Bells"	The Browns	
18	September 7	"The Three Bells"	The Browns	
18	September 14	"The Three Bells"	The Browns	
19	September 21	"Sleep Walk"	Santo & Johnny	
19	September 28	"Sleep Walk"	Santo & Johnny	
20	October 5	"Mack the Knife"	Bobby Darin	
20	October 12	"Mack the Knife"	Bobby Darin	
20	October 19	"Mack the Knife"	Bobby Darin	
20	October 26	"Mack the Knife"	Bobby Darin	
20	November 2	"Mack the Knife"	Bobby Darin	
20	November 9	"Mack the Knife"	Bobby Darin	
21	November 16	"Mr. Blue"	The Fleetwoods	
20 (re)	November 23	"Mack the Knife"	Bobby Darin	
20 (re)	November 30	"Mack the Knife"	Bobby Darin	
20 (re)	December 7	"Mack the Knife"	Bobby Darin	
22	December 14	"Heartaches by the Number"	Guy Mitchell	
22	December 21	"Heartaches by the Number"	Guy Mitchell	
23	December 28	"Why"	Frankie Avalon	

== Number-one artists ==
List of number-one artists by total weeks at number one
Weeks at No. 1	Artist
9	Bobby Darin
6	Johnny Horton
6	Frankie Avalon
5	The Fleetwoods
4	Lloyd Price
4	Paul Anka
4	The Browns
3	The Platters
2	The Chipmunks with David Seville
2	Wilbert Harrison
2	Elvis Presley
2	Santo & Johnny
2	Guy Mitchell
1	Dave "Baby" Cortez

== See also ==
- 1959 in music
- List of Billboard Hot 100 top-ten singles in 1959
- List of Billboard Hot 100 number-one singles from 1958 to 1969
