= Sandy Records =

- Founded: 1957
- Founder: Paul DuBose; Johnny Bozeman
- Genre: Rock and Roll
- Country of origin: US
- Location: Mobile, Alabama

Sandy Records was a short-lived but very influential independent rock and roll record label established in Mobile, Alabama by Paul DuBose and Johnny Bozeman in early 1957. It launched the careers of many artists such as Ray Sawyer, lead vocalist of Dr. Hook and the Medicine Show.

== Artist ==
- Helen Bozeman
- Johnny Bozeman
- Ken Bozeman
- Curtis Bunyard
- Johnny Foster
- Ronny Keenan
- Jackie Morningstar
- Travis Pritchett
- George Richardson
- Ray Sawyer
- Morris Simmons
- Travis & Bob
- Darryl Vincent
- Happy Wainwright
- Buddy Walker
- Bob Weaver
- Floyd Whitehurst

== Subsidiary labels ==
- Shane Records
- Orange Records

== See also ==
- List of record labels
