= My Heart Is an Open Book =

Single by Carl Dobkins Jr.

from the album Carl Dobkins, Jr.
- B-side: "My Pledge to You"
- Released: December 1958
- Genre: Rockabilly
- Length: 2:20
- Label: Decca
- Songwriters: Hal David, Lee Pockriss

Carl Dobkins Jr. singles chronology
"If You Don't Want My Lovin'" (1958)	"My Heart Is an Open Book" (1958)	"Lucky Devil" (1959)

"My Heart Is an Open Book" is a song written by Hal David and Lee Pockriss and performed by Carl Dobkins Jr. It reached #3 on the U.S. pop chart and #11 on the U.S. R&B chart in 1959. It was featured on his 1959 album Carl Dobkins, Jr.

The single ranked #19 on Billboard's Year-End Hot 100 singles of 1959.

== Other versions ==
- Jimmy Dean released a version of the song as a single in 1958, but it did not chart.
- Michael Holliday released a version of the song as a single in 1958, but it did not chart.
- Gerhard Wendland released a German-language version, under the title "Sie" ("She") in 1959. The German lyrics by Kurt Hertha are not a translation of Hal David's original text.
- Dean Martin released a version of the song on his 1965 album, Dean Martin Hits Again.
- Cliff Richard released a version of the song on his 1965 EP, Take Four by Cliff Richard.
- Jan Crutchfield released a version of the song as a single in 1968, but it did not chart.
- The Fantastic Baggys released a version of the song on their compilation album, Anywhere the Girls Are!: The Best of Fantastic Baggys.
- Luther Henderson and His Orchestra released a version of the song on their 2002 compilation album, Clap Hands!/The Greatest Sound Around.
