= Kleopatra =

Kleopatra is a non-English spelling of Cleopatra. It may also refer to:

- 216 Kleopatra, a triple asteroid orbiting in the asteroid belt
- Kleopatra, a Gpg4win certificate manager, for OpenPGP and X.509

== Music ==
- Kleopatra (singer) (born 1963), a Greek singer
- Kleopatra (opera), a Danish-language opera by August Enna 1875
- Kleopatra, a 2002 musical by Czech singer Michal David
- "Kleopatra", a song by Fergie from Double Dutchess

== See also ==
- Cleopatra (disambiguation)
