= Just Ask Your Heart =

Single by Frankie Avalon
- B-side: "Two Fools"
- Released: August 17, 1959
- Genre: Pop
- Length: 2:20
- Label: Chancellor Records 1040
- Songwriter(s): Diane DeNota, Joe Ricci, Pete Damato

Frankie Avalon singles chronology
| "Bobby Sox to Stockings" / "A Boy Without a Girl" (1959) | "Just Ask Your Heart" (1959) | "Why" / "Swingin' on a Rainbow" (1959) |

"Just Ask Your Heart" is a song written by Diane DeNota, Joe Ricci, and Pete Damato and performed by Frankie Avalon. The song reached #7 on the Billboard Top 100 in 1959.

The song was arranged by Peter De Angelis.

The song was ranked #59 on Billboard magazine's Top Hot 100 songs of 1959.

== Other versions ==
- Mike Preston released a version as the B-side to his single "Mr. Blue" in the United Kingdom in October 1959.
- Roy Young released a version as the B-side to his single "Hey Little Girl" in the United Kingdom in October 1959.
- Svenne & Lotta released a version as the B-side to their single "Do You Want To Dance" in Sweden in 1973.
