= SS United Victory =

Victory ship of the United States

History

United States
- Name: United Victory
- Owner: War Shipping Administration
- Operator: American President Lines
- Builder: Oregon Shipbuilding Company Portland
- Laid down: 19 November 1943
- Launched: 12 January 1944
- Sponsored by: Mrs. Thomas Back, wife of the president of Crowell-Collier Publishing Company, which campaigned to get Victory ships into production
- Christened: 12 January 1944
- Completed: 28 February 1944
- In service: March 1944
- Fate: Sold to Furness Withy, 1946

United Kingdom
- Name: Khedive Ismail
- Operator: Khedivial Mail S.S. Company
- Route: Alexandria – New York City
- Maiden voyage: 15 March 1948
- Renamed: Cleopatra, 1956
- Identification: IMO number: 5075945

(United Arab Republic) Egypt
- Acquired: United Arab Maritime Company 1961
- Identification: IMO number: 5075945
- Fate: Scrapped, 1981

General characteristics
- Class & type: VC2-S-AP3 Victory ship
- Tonnage: 7,612 GRT, 4,553 NRT
- Displacement: 15,200 tons
- Length: 455 ft (139 m)
- Beam: 62 ft (19 m)
- Draught: 28 ft (8.5 m)
- Installed power: 8,500 shp (6,300 kW)
- Propulsion: HP & LP turbines geared to a single 20.5-foot (6.2 m) propeller
- Speed: 16.5 knots (30.6 km/h; 19.0 mph)
- Boats & landing craft carried: 4 lifeboats
- Complement: 62 Merchant Marine and 28 US Naval Armed Guards
- Armament: 1 × 5-inch (127 mm)/38 caliber gun; 1 × 3-inch (76 mm)/50 caliber gun; 8 × 20 mm Oerlikon

SS United Victory was the first of 531 Victory ships built during World War II under the Emergency Shipbuilding program. She was launched by the Oregon Shipbuilding Corporation on 12 January 1944, completed on 28 February 1944, and had her maiden voyage a month later. The ship's United States Maritime Commission designation was VC2-S-AP3, hull number 85. The Maritime Commission turned her over to a civilian contractor, the American President Lines, for operation until the end of hostilities.

== World War II ==
During World War II, she served in the Pacific War, participating in the battle of Okinawa from 10 April 1945 to 19 April 1945. She used her deck guns to defend against attacking kamikaze aircraft while providing logistics support for the invasion of Okinawa. Some of the United States Navy Armed Guards were wounded when the ship was damaged on 16 April 1945, but there was no loss of life.

== Postwar service ==
The United Victory was purchased by Furness Withy in 1946, and renamed Khedive Ismail after Isma'il Pasha. After refitting as an 8196-GRT 78-passenger cargo liner, she began service between Alexandria and New York City on 15 March 1948. She was renamed Cleopatra in 1956. Service to New York ended when she was nationalized by the United Arab Maritime Company in 1961. She was acquired by the Egyptian Navigation Company in 1974, and scrapped at the Gadani ship-breaking yard in 1981.

== Honors ==
The crew of Naval Armed Guard on SS United Victory' earned service stars in World War II, for war action during the assault occupation of Okinawa from 10 April 1945 to 19 April 1945. She used her deck guns to defend herself and other ships in action.

== Sources ==
- Sawyer, L.A. and W.H. Mitchell. Victory ships and tankers: The history of the 'Victory' type cargo ships and of the tankers built in the United States of America during World War II, Cornell Maritime Press, 1974, ISBN 0-87033-182-5.
- United States Maritime Commission:
- Victory Cargo Ships
