= Cleopatra (Artemisia Gentileschi, Ferrara) =

Painting by Artemisia Gentileschi

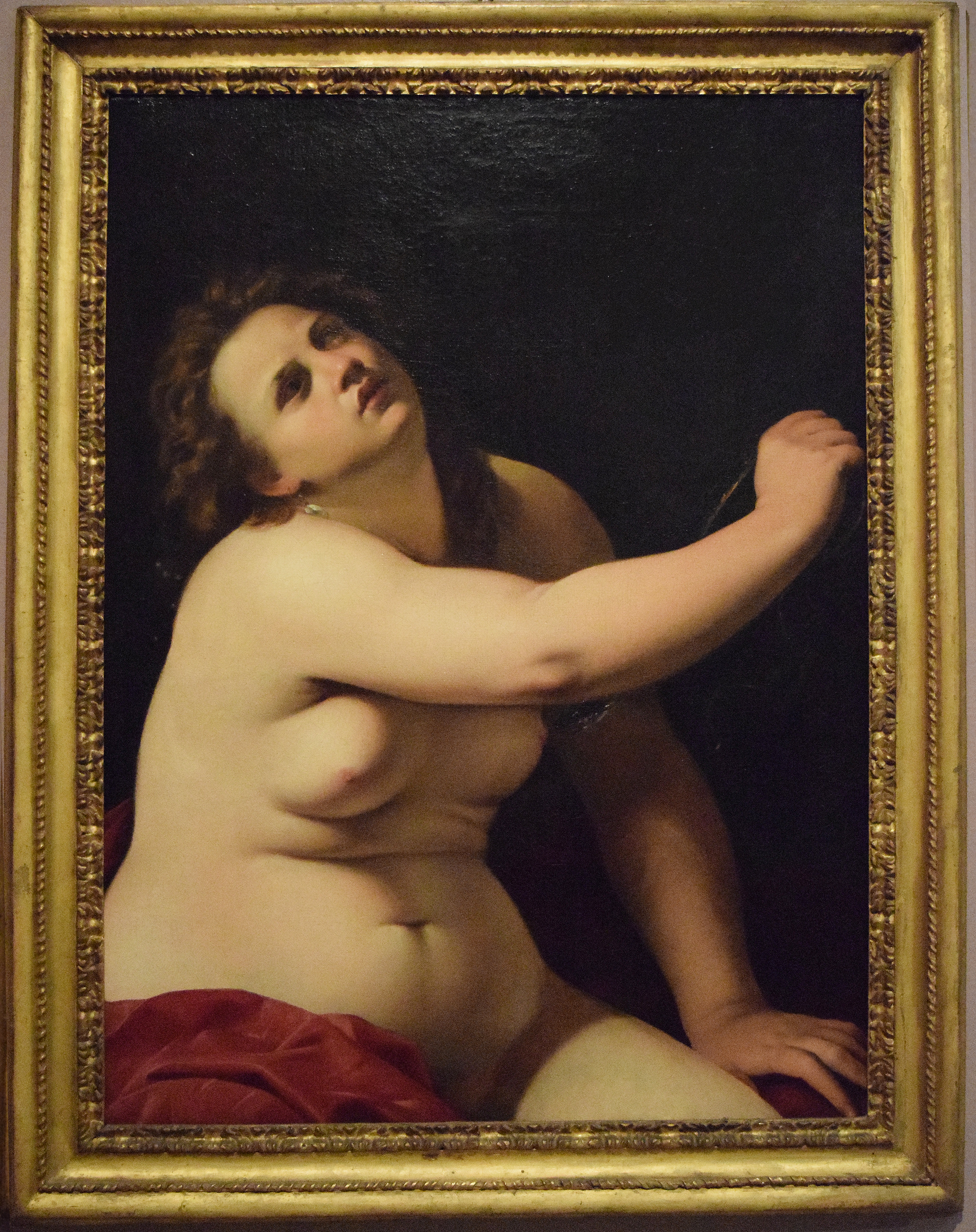
- Artist: Artemisia Gentileschi
- Year: c.1620
- Medium: oil on canvas
- Dimensions: 97 cm × 71.5 cm (38 in × 28.1 in)
- Location: Fondazione Cavallini-Sgarbi collection, Ferrara

Cleopatra is a c.1620 painting by Artemisia Gentileschi, now in the Fondazione Cavallini-Sgarbi collection in Ferrara. It was formerly misattributed to Guido Cagnacci. It shows Cleopatra committing suicide with an asp.

Gentileschi painted four different versions of Cleopatra, one of which is currently lost. This version shows the queen upright, in a pose used by contemporary artists such as Guido Reni.

== See also ==
- List of works by Artemisia Gentileschi

== Sources ==
- Nancy, Jean-Luc (2005). The ground of the image. New York. ISBN 9780823225408.
