= Tell Him No =

Single by Travis and Bob
- B-side: "We're Too Young"
- Released: March 9, 1959
- Length: 2:05
- Label: Sandy
- Songwriter(s): Travis Pritchett

"Tell Him No" is a 1959 song by Travis and Bob and was the only Top 40 hit for the duo in the United States while peaking at #1 in Canada and the Netherlands. The song also reached #1 in the Netherlands with cover versions by Dean and Marc, The Mudlarks and The Fouryo's.

== Background ==
"Tell Him No" was written about a boy telling a girl to watch out for another boy interested in her.

== Recording ==
"Tell Him No" was planned to be the B-side for Travis and Bob's cover of "All I Have to Do Is Dream" by The Everly Brothers. However, after performing for record producer Henry Bailey in Mobile, Alabama, the duo were offered a record deal. Travis and Bob recorded the track in Gulfport, Mississippi for Sandy Records.

== Acquisition ==
In March 1959, Dot Records bought the distribution rights for "Tell Him No" from Sandy Records for $12,000. Cameo Records and Liberty Records also competed for the rights of the single.

== Reception ==
Billboard predicted Travis and Bob's version of "Tell Him No" would become a future hit.

== Chart performance ==
In the United States, Travis and Bob's version of "Tell Him No" charted at #8 on the Billboard Hot 100 while a cover by Dean and Marc reached #42. Other non-charting covers in the US include a Bigtop recording by The Jackson Brothers and Margie Rayburn's rendition of the song produced for Liberty but later retracted.

Outside of the United States, non-charting covers of "Tell Him No" were released in Australia by The Unichords for W&G and Ted & Ray for His Master's Voice. Alternatively, "Tell Him No" reached #1 in the Netherlands for Travis and Bob alongside covers by Dean and Marc, The Mudlarks and The Fouryo's, which was released under the name "Zeg niet nee".

== Charts ==
=== Travis & Bob version ===
Chart (1959)	Peak position
Canada (CHUM)	1
Netherlands (Single Top 100)	1
US Billboard Hot 100	8
US Hot R&B/Hip-Hop Songs (Billboard)	21

=== Dean & Marc version ===
Chart (1959)	Peak position
US Billboard Hot 100	42
Netherlands (Single Top 100)	1

=== The Fouryo's version ===
Chart (1959)	Peak position
Netherlands (Single Top 100)	1

=== The Mudlarks version ===
Chart (1959)	Peak position
Netherlands (Single Top 100)	1

== See also ==
- List of number-one singles of 1959 (Canada)
