= Billy Maxted =

American jazz pianist (1917–2001)

- Birth name: William George Maxted
- Born: January 21, 1917 Racine, Wisconsin, U.S.
- Died: October 1, 2001 (aged 84) Fort Lauderdale, Florida
- Genres: Jazz, swing, Dixieland
- Occupation(s): Musician, arranger
- Instrument: Piano
- Years active: 1937–1960s
- Labels: MGM, Brunswick, Cadence, Seeco

William George Maxted (January 21, 1917 – October 11, 2001) was an American jazz pianist.

== Career ==
Maxted began his career in 1937 as a member of the Red Nichols big band, for which he wrote arrangements. After three years, he played with Teddy Powell, Ben Pollack, and Will Bradley. Maxted served in the U.S. Navy, then wrote arrangements for the big bands of Claude Thornhill and Benny Goodman. During 1947, Maxted led a band with Ray Eberle and soon after led the Manhattan Jazz Band, which played Dixieland with Bob Zurke on boogie-woogie piano.

During the 1950s, he had a steady job as house pianist at Nick's club in Greenwich Village. Maxted also recorded for MGM, Brunswick, Cadence, and Seeco. In 1958, British bandleader Reg Owen had a major hit on the American charts with Maxted's upbeat instrumental composition "Manhattan Spiritual", released on the Palette label.

In the 1960s, he recorded for K&H and Liberty and as a sideman for Bob Crosby, Pee Wee Erwin, and Red Nichols. Maxted moved to Florida in the 1970s, and continued to play around Broward County for many years, including a years-long stay at The Beach Club. He died in Fort Lauderdale on October 11, 2001, aged 84.

== Discography ==
- 1955: Billy Maxted Plays Hi Fi Keyboard (Cadence)
- 1959: Dixieland Manhattan Style (Cadence)
- 1959: Jazz at Nick's (Cadence)
- 1959: Bourbon St. Billy and the Blues (Seeco)
- 1959: The Art of Jazz (Seeco)
- 1961: Swingability (K&H)
- 1963: The Big Swingers (K&H)
- 1966: Maxted Makes It! (Liberty)
