= Cleopatra Algemene Studentenvereniging Groningen =

Student association in Groningen, the Netherlands

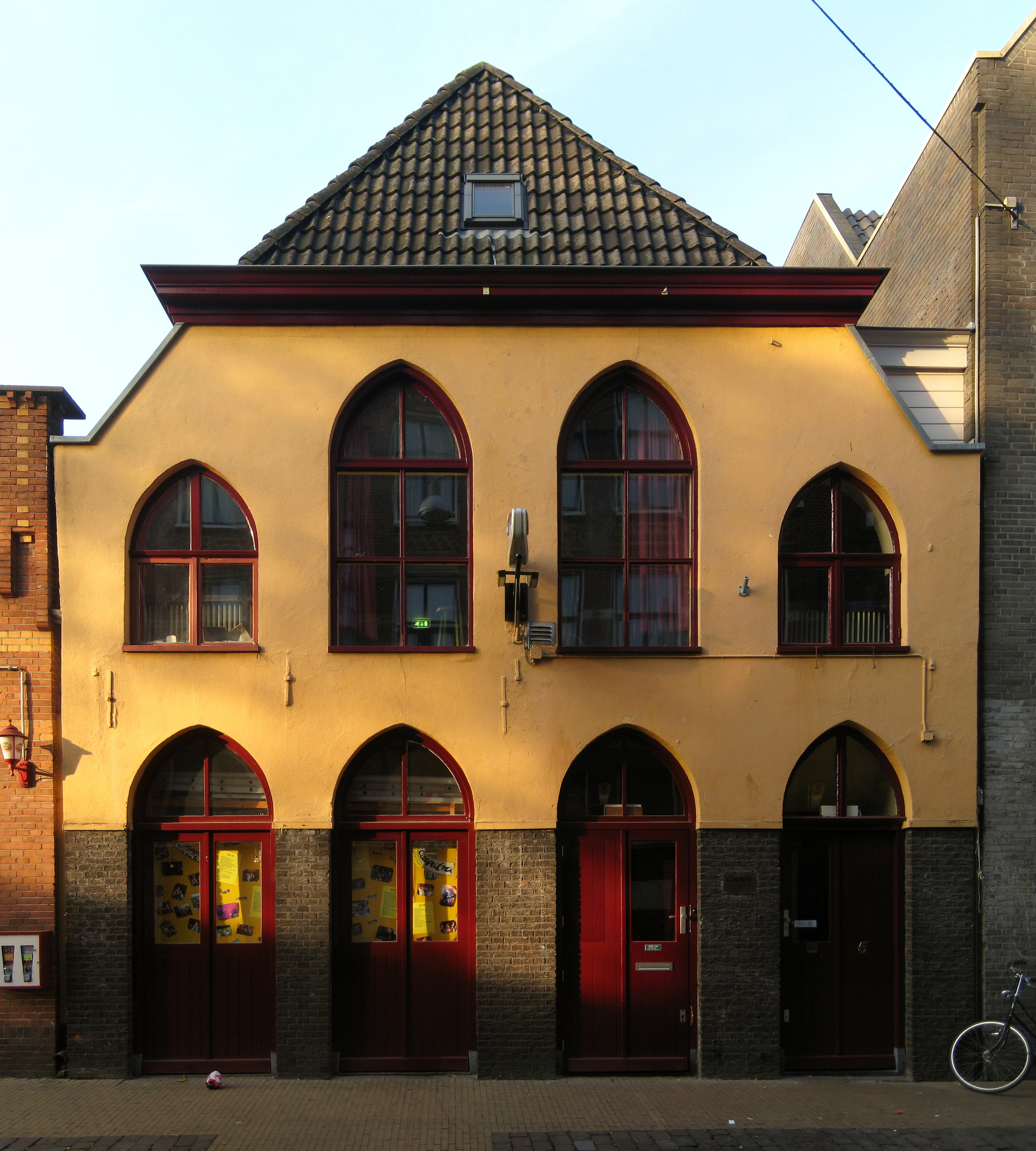
The Cleopatra General Student Association

Cleopatra General Student Association Groningen (Dutch: Cleopatra Algemene Studentenvereniging Groningen) is a studentenvereniging (student association) in Groningen, the Netherlands. As of 2025, the association had approximately 500 members.

== History ==
Cleopatra was founded on December 3, 1985. At the time of its founding, all existing student associations were either traditional/conservative, or Christian, or Frisian. Cleopatra emerged from a tutor group of the Economy faculty of Groningen State University. Legend has it that the tutor group initially proposed to name the new association after their tutor, Theo van Uum. Van Uum objected however. It was only at the notary that the founders named it after the ancient politician Cleopatra.

From its beginning, Cleopatra deliberately kept its membership small, so that the association would remain cozy and members could treat one another as equals. In 1989 it had 180 members, and by 1992 it had grown to 230. Even with its current membership of around 500, Cleopatra is much smaller than the traditional student associations Albertus Magnus (approx. 2500 members) and Vindicat atque Polit (over 2000 members).

In 1986, Cleopatra moved into a permanent location on the Reitemakersrijge, but by 1994 there was already a need to find suitable new premises. The newly-formed Groninger student political party Student en Stad included this as one of the key points on its initial agenda. Later in the year, Cleopatra moved into its current location: Kleine Pelsterstraat 5/5a (Groningen), a 15th-century municipal monument. The association extensively renovated parts of the building in 2000.

== Mission ==
Cleopatra intends to be different from other associations. Its main characteristic is the fact that hazing (a compulsory, often abusive introduction period) is forbidden. Openness and equality are the pillars of the association.

Cleopatra is a member of ZEUS (Zusterlijke Eenheid Uit Saamhorigheid "Sisterly Unity Out Of Concord"), a confederation of alternative student associations in other cities. Along with seven other student associations connected to the Rijks Universiteit Groningen and the Hanze University of Applied Sciences, Cleopatra also belongs to the representative association Contractus.

== Activities ==
Cleopatra resembles many other student associations in the Netherlands in having various substructures (although with different names) and aiming at enhancing the social contact between its members by organising various leisure time activities. Unlike at some student associations, the regular events and parties at Cleopatra are not mandatory.

The structures include:

- Boats (formalised groups of friends)
- Tribes (introduction groups for new members)
- Committees
- Colleges (special interest groups)
- "Columns" (Zuil, Zeer Uitgebreid Intergratie Lichaam, "Vastly Expanded Integration Body", for various initiatives.

Since 2007, Cleopatra has organised Preipop, a free two-day music festival held every February.

Each year during KEI Week (the introductory week at the start of the academic year in Groningen), Cleopatra members build a façade out of beer crates in front of the association building, to attract attention from new students.
