= Carl Dobkins Jr. =

American singer and songwriter (1941–2020)

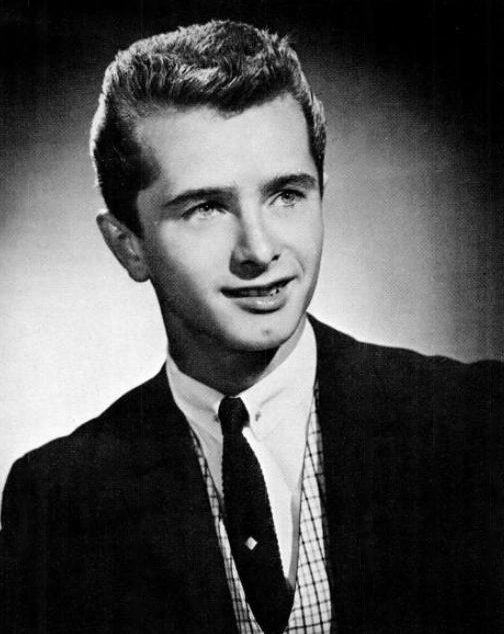
- Dobkins in 1969

Background information
- Birth name: Carl Edward Dobkins
- Born: January 13, 1941; Cincinnati, Ohio, U.S.
- Died: April 8, 2020 (aged 79); Mason, Ohio
- Genres: Traditional pop, country, rockabilly
- Instrument: Vocals
- Years active: 1957–2020
- Labels: Fraternity, Decca, Atco, Colpix, Chalet

Carl Edward Dobkins Jr. (January 13, 1941 – April 8, 2020) was an American singer and songwriter, best known for his 1959 hit, "My Heart Is an Open Book", which went to No.3 on the Billboard Hot 100 chart. The record sold over one million copies, resulting in the award of a gold disc.

== Life and career ==
Dobkins was born in Cincinnati, Ohio, the son of Helen and Carl Dobkins. He was from a musical family, and learned the ukulele and guitar as a child. He started writing songs in his teens, and began singing at local events. The Seniors, Dobkins' backup group, included Keith Ross, Paul Powers, Harry Clifton and Bill Smith. The Seniors first met with a common interest in singing at Nast Memorial Methodist Church in Cincinnati. The group sang together for approximately eight years. Dobkins and the Seniors were promoted by Gil Sheppard, a local Cincinnati radio disc jockey, who noted the young singer's early high school compositions and a two-song demo record. This led to a recording contract with Fraternity Records, who released their first record.

After recording "If You Don't Want My Lovin'" at King Records studios, Sheppard sold the master recording to Decca Records. Dobkins then recorded sessions for Decca in Nashville, Tennessee, which included "My Heart is an Open Book" in 1959, which reached No. 3 on the pop chart and number 11 on the R&B chart. He also served in the United States Army Reserve for six months. When reissued, "If You Don't Want My Lovin'" reached number 67 later the same year. Dobkins had two other Hot 100 entries: "Lucky Devil" (number 25, 1959), and "Exclusively Yours" (number 62, 1960).

Dobkins was featured frequently at Castle Farms, and on television for the Bob Braun Show (WLW-T, Cincinnati). He appeared fourteen times as a guest on Dick Clark's American Bandstand, and toured with such singers as Bobby Vee, Frankie Avalon, and Jan & Dean. He continued to perform at oldies festivals for some years.

He was inducted into the Cincinnati Rock and Roll Hall of Fame, and the Rockabilly Hall of Fame.

=== Personal life ===
Dobkins attended Hughes High School in the late 1950s, but moved to Mt Healthy High School graduating in 1959. Dobkins married Janice Cox in 1960 and had two daughters, six grandchildren, and five great-grand children.

He died on April 8, 2020, at the age of 79.

== Discography ==
- Fraternity F-794 – January 1958 – "Take Hold of My Hand" / "That's Why I'm Asking"
- Decca 9-30656 – May 1958 – "If You Don't Want My Lovin'" / "Love is Everything" – US No. 67
- Decca 9-30803 – December 1958 – "My Heart Is an Open Book" / "My Pledge to You" – US No. 3
- Decca ED 2664 – August 1959 – "If You Don't Want My Lovin'" / "Love is Everything" / "My Heart Is an Open Book" / "My Pledge to You"
- Decca 9-31020 – November 1959 – "Lucky Devil" / "(There's a Little Song a-Singing) In My Heart" – US No. 25
- Brunswick 45-05817 – March 1960 – "Lucky Devil" / "(There's a Little Song a-Singing) In My Heart" – UK No. 44
- Decca 9-31088 - April 1960 - ""Exclusively Yours" / "One Little Girl" - US No. 62
- Decca 9-31143 - September 1960 - "A Different Kind of Love" / "Genie"
- Decca 9-31182 - November 1960 - "Take Time Out" / "Lovelight"
- Decca 31260 – May 1961 – "That's What I Call True Love" / "Pretty Little Girl in the Yellow Dress"
- Decca 31301 – September 1961 – "Sawdust Dolly" / "A Chance to Belong"
- Decca 31353 – January 1962 – "Ask Me No Questions" / "Promise Me"
- Atco 45-6283 – January 1964 – "If Teardrops Were Diamonds" / "I'm So Sorry Little Girl"
- Colpix CP-762 – January 1965 – "A Little Bit Later on Down the Line" / "His Loss Is My Gain"
- Chalet CHR-1053 – May 1969 – "The Days of Sand and Shovels" / "Linda the Motel Maid"
- Chalet CHR-1056 – August 1969 – "My Heart Is an Open Book" / "Pictures"
