= The Virtues (band) =

American rock and roll band

The Virtues were an early American rock and roll band from Philadelphia, Pennsylvania, United States.

== History ==
The group formed around leader Frank Virtue (January 21, 1923 – June 11, 1994), who played the violin as a child and took up the guitar and the double bass as a teenager. He continued with the latter as a member of the Philadelphia Orchestra and studied orchestration at Temple University. He enlisted in the Navy in 1945 and became bandleader of the Regular Navy Dance Band in United States Naval Training Center Bainbridge. He was discharged in 1946 because his father, who had been diagnosed with cancer, could no longer support his family.

Virtue considered putting together a big band but, due to financial constraints, assembled an amplified trio instead, with Ralph Frederico on the piano and Steve Rossi on the guitar. Virtue named the band the Virtuoso Trio after their formation in 1947.

The Virtuoso Trio toured the regional club circuit for the better part of a decade, playing as far as Canada and making regular appearances on Philadelphia radio and television. They performed as a backup ensemble for Patti Page, Rosemary Clooney, Dick Haymes, June Christy, and others. When local Pennsylvanians Bill Haley & the Comets hit big in the mid-1950s, Virtue found a receptive audience in the teenagers who loved the nascent rock and roll craze.

By this time, the group's lineup had expanded, with Virtue on the bass, John Renner on the saxophone, Jimmy Bruno on guitar, Joe Vespe on drums, and Dave Kaplin as an occasional vocalist. Under the name the Virtues, they released a rock reworking of Arthur "Guitar Boogie" Smith's country hit "Guitar Boogie" in 1958 under the title "Guitar Boogie Shuffle", on the Hunt label. The instrumental became a major hit in the U.S., peaking at No. 27 on the Black Singles chart and No. 5 on the Billboard Hot 100 in 1959. The single also became a sheet music smash, selling well worldwide. Several singles followed – "Flippin", "Boogie Woogie", "Vaya con Dios" – but none of them succeeded; the group was signed by ABC-Paramount, but their only return to the charts was with the 1962 release "Guitar Boogie Shuffle Twist" (U.S. No. 95).

Toward the end of 1962, Virtue disbanded the group and pursued a career as a record producer and recording engineer. His studio, Virtue Recording Studios, located at 1618 N. Broad St., was one of the top studios in Philadelphia for a number of years until closing in the early 1980s. Producing and mixing (with his wife Mary Anne Virtue) groups such as Society's Child, a top 40 band from the Wilmington, Delaware area. His original studio, in the basement of his house on Fayette Street, was where "Guitar Boogie Shuffle" was originally recorded.

Collectables Records released a collection of Virtues instrumentals in 1993 as Guitar in Orbit.
