= Bobby Sox to Stockings =

Single by Frankie Avalon
- B-side: "A Boy Without a Girl"
- Released: May 18, 1959
- Genre: Pop
- Length: 2:30
- Label: Chancellor Records 1036
- Songwriters: Russell Faith, Clarence Kehner, Richard DiCicco

Frankie Avalon singles chronology
| "Venus" (1959) | "Bobby Sox to Stockings" (1959) | "Just Ask Your Heart" / "Two Fools" (1959) |

"Bobby Sox to Stockings" is a song written by Russell Faith, Clarence Kehner and Richard DiCicco and performed by Frankie Avalon. The song reached #8 on the Billboard Top 100 and #26 on the R&B chart in 1959.

The song was arranged by Peter De Angelis.

The song was ranked #70 on Billboard magazine's Top Hot 100 songs of 1959.
