= A Boy Without a Girl =

Single by Frankie Avalon
- A-side: "Bobby Sox to Stockings"
- Released: May 18, 1959
- Genre: Pop
- Length: 1:58
- Label: Chancellor Records 1036
- Songwriter(s): Sid Jacobson, Ruth Sexton

Frankie Avalon singles chronology
"Venus" (1959)	"A Boy Without a Girl" (1959)	"Just Ask Your Heart" / "Two Fools" (1959)

"A Boy Without a Girl" is a song written by Sid Jacobson and Ruth Sexton and performed by Frankie Avalon. The song reached #10 on the Billboard Top 100 in 1959. It was performed by Avalon in the 1964 film, Muscle Beach Party.

The song was arranged by Peter De Angelis.

The song was ranked No. 82 on Billboard magazine's Top Hot 100 songs of 1959.

== Other versions ==
- Terry Dene released a version in August 1959, on a single with "Thank You Pretty Baby".
- Jimmy Crawford released a version as a single in the United Kingdom in May 1962.
- Ronnie Hilton released a version as the B-side to his single "Rocky Old Boat" in the United Kingdom in December 1965.
- Vic Laurens recorded in it 1963 in French on the Mercury label, title in French : "My Heart Without Your Love".
