= Guitar Boogie (song) =

Instrumental first recorded by Arthur Smith

Single by the Rambler Trio featuring Arthur Smith
- B-side: "Beaty Steel Blues"
- Released: Prior to January 5, 1946
- Recorded: Prior to September 15, 1945
- Genre: Hillbilly boogie
- Length: 3:22
- Label: Super Disc
- Songwriter: Arthur Smith

"Guitar Boogie" is a guitar instrumental recorded by Arthur "Guitar Boogie" Smith in 1945. It was one of the first recordings in the style later dubbed "hillbilly boogie" to reach a widespread audience, and eventually sold nearly three million copies. It was the first guitar instrumental to climb the country music charts, and then crossover and also gain high rankings on the popular music charts. "Guitar Boogie" has been interpreted and recorded by a variety of musicians. It is among the songs discussed as the first rock and roll record.

== Original song ==
"Guitar Boogie" is an uptempo twelve-bar boogie-style instrumental and is patterned after older boogie-woogie piano pieces. Roosevelt Graves and His Brother recorded an instrumental "Guitar Boogie" in 1929, which was issued by Paramount Records. It features a descending arpeggio based on "Pinetop's Boogie Woogie", a piano-based piece recorded by Pinetop Smith in 1928. Music historian Larry Birnbaum describes it as "not the same as Arthur Smith's country hit by the same title".

In his version, Smith performs the piano parts on guitar, alternating between boogie rhythmic patterns and soloing. Originally a jazz musician, Smith explained, "I guess I picked that [boogie-woogie] from Tommy Dorsey's 'Boogie Woogie', 'cause I didn't listen to country or blues, I listened to big band in those days". Smith first recorded "Guitar Boogie" in 1945 with the Rambler Trio, with Don Reno on rhythm guitar and Roy Lear on bass. There has been conflicting information on the type of guitar Smith used for the recording; several sources identify it as an acoustic guitar and others as an electric guitar. The piece was released under the name "the Rambler Trio featuring Arthur Smith" by the independent Super Disc Records label. Regionally "Guitar Boogie" did well, due in part to Smith's appearances on popular radio programs, such as Charlotte, North Carolina WBT's Carolina Hayride.

In October 1948, MGM Records (which had purchased Super Disc and Smith's contract) re-released the instrumental under the name "Arthur (Guitar Boogie) Smith and His Cracker-Jacks". By 1949, "Guitar Boogie" reached number eight during a stay of seven weeks on the Hot Country Songs chart and number 25 on the Billboard Hot 100 chart, making it "the first guitar instrumental to climb the Country charts [then] crossover, and climb the Pop Charts". As an early popular example of hillbilly boogie, it is a link between 1940s Western swing and honky-tonk and 1950s rockabilly.

== Guitar Boogie Shuffle ==
In the 1950s, rock and roll versions of "Guitar Boogie", usually titled "Guitar Boogie Shuffle" (but credited to Arthur Smith), were recorded. AllMusic critic Bruce Eder describes these renditions as having "new accents and a beat that took it out of country boogie and Western swing". In 1953, a version by the Super-Sonics was titled "New Guitar Boogie Shuffle" and another by the Esquire Boys with Danny Cedrone on guitar was titled "Guitar Boogie Shuffle". In 1958, a Philadelphia band, Frank Virtue and the Virtues, recorded it as "Guitar Boogie Shuffle". In 1959, the Virtues' single reached number five on the Billboard Hot 100 chart and number 27 on the Hot R&B Sides chart, which Eder calls "one of the most popular and influential instrumentals of its era". In Canada it reached number two. Also in 1959, a version of "Guitar Boogie Shuffle" by Bert Weedon backed with "Bert's Boogie" reached number ten in the UK charts. A version of "Guitar Boogie Shuffle" (simply titled "Guitar Boogie") by New Zealand musician Peter Posa became a bit hit in his native country in 1962. Ten years later, a rendition appeared on the Ventures' 1972 album, Rock & Roll Forever with Harvey Mandel guesting on lead guitar.

== Recordings by others ==
Numerous guitarists have interpreted and recorded "Guitar Boogie". Early versions of the song include those by the Les Paul Trio (1947) and Alvino Rey (1946 and 1948). In 1958, a different song titled "Guitar Boogie", with more chording and very different breaks, was included on Chuck Berry's second album, One Dozen Berrys. (Jeff Beck, then with the Yardbirds later based his "Jeff's Boogie" on Berry's version.) Freddie King's 1960 blues guitar instrumental "Hide Away" incorporates elements from various songs, including sections similar to those in "Guitar Boogie". Later renditions of "Guitar Boogie" include live versions by Tommy Emmanuel and Tom Petty.

The Swedish group Sven Ingvars recorded Guitar Boogie on their first EP in 1961 (Philips 421 587 PE).
