= I've Had It (The Bell Notes song) =

Single by The Bell Notes
- B-side: "Be Mine"
- Released: December 1958
- Genre: Rock and roll
- Length: 2:40
- Label: Time
- Songwriter(s): Carl Bonura, Ray Ceroni

The Bell Notes singles chronology
"I've Had It" (1958)	"Old Spanish Town" (1959)

"I've Had It" is a song written by Carl Bonura and Ray Ceroni and performed by The Bell Notes.

== Chart performance ==
"I've Had It" reached #6 on the U.S. pop chart and #19 on the U.S. R&B chart in 1959. The song was ranked #62 on Billboard's Year-End Hot 100 singles of 1959.

== Other charting versions ==
- Lonnie Mack released a version of the song which reached #128 on the U.S. pop chart in 1964.
- Fanny released a version of the song which reached #79 on the U.S. pop chart in 1974.

== Other versions ==
- The Starlets released a version of the song as a single in 1965, but it did not chart.
- Alex Chilton released a version of the song on his 1979 album Like Flies on Sherbert.
- Louise Goffin released a version of the song as a single in 1981, but it did not chart.
- Gene Summers released a version of the song on his 1993 compilation album School of Rock 'n Roll.
- The Slades released a version of the song on the 1998 various artist album The Domino Records Story.
- The Mojo Men released a version of the song on their 2008 compilation album Not Too Old to Start Cryin': The Lost 1966 Masters.
- Fabulous Poodles released a version of the song on their 2018 compilation album Mirror Stars: The Complete Pye Recordings 1976-1980.
