= Bob Marcucci =

American film producer

- Born: Robert Phillip Marcucci; February 28, 1930; Philadelphia, Pennsylvania, U.S.
- Died: March 9, 2011 (aged 81); Ontario, California, U.S.
- Occupations: Music business executive, film producer, talent manager, lyricist
- Years active: 1955–2011
- Organization(s): Chancellor Records, Romar Records

Robert Phillip Marcucci (February 28, 1930 – March 9, 2011) was an American lyricist, talent manager, film producer, and the owner of Chancellor Records and Robert P. Marcucci Productions. He discovered and managed the careers of Fabian and Frankie Avalon, among others. The 1980 movie, The Idolmaker, is loosely based on his life in the record industry.

== Early life and career ==
Born and raised in Philadelphia, Bob Marcucci started in the music industry at age 25, as a songwriter, and subsequently borrowed $10,000 from his father to launch Chancellor Records.

Circa 1957, he signed Frankie Avalon as one of his first acts. That year, despite Avalon's dislike of the song, Avalon sang "DeDe Dinah" written by Marcucci. By 1959, Avalon had succeeded with his single, "Venus". Around this time, Marcucci began to search for new stars.

His next act was his neighbor's 14-year-old son, Fabian Forte. Marcucci's neighbor had suffered a heart attack, after which Marcucci went to help the family. He spotted the neighbor's young son and after the father had recovered, inquired as to whether the youngster would be interested in a career in music. Fabian initially declined but, because his family needed the money, eventually signed on as Marcucci's next act. After two years Fabian bought out his contract.

Marcucci was the long-time manager of Hollywood gossip columnist Rona Barrett. He was co-producer of the 1984 version of The Razor's Edge, starring Bill Murray in a rare dramatic role. The following year, he produced A Letter to Three Wives for television.

== Later years ==
In his later years, Marcucci continued to manage artists such as Danielle Brisebois, Ami Dolenz, Michael T. Weiss, Ron Moss and Cheryl Powers through his production companies.

Marcucci died on March 9, 2011, at a hospital in Ontario, California, of respiratory complications and severe infections.
