= Travis and Bob =

American rock and roll duo

Travis and Bob were an American rock and roll duo from Jackson, Alabama, United States. Its members were Travis Wilbon Pritchett (March 18, 1939, Jackson – October 18, 2010, Mobile) and Bob Weaver (born July 27, 1939, Jackson).

In 1959, they released a single on the independent label Sandy Records called "Tell Him No," which was written by Pritchett. Dot Records picked up the single for nationwide distribution, and it became a hit, reaching No. 21 on the Billboard R&B charts and No. 8 on the Billboard Hot 100. Despite recording additional singles for Big Top Records and Mercury Records, the duo never had another hit single.

In June 1960, the duo filed a lawsuit against Sandy's founders, Johnny Bozeman and Paul DuBose, claiming they did not receive royalties from airplay and sales of their recordings.

Pritchett died on October 18, 2010, at a Mobile hospital, at age 71.
