= The Bell Notes =

American rock and roll band

- Origin: New York City, New York, US
- Genres: Rock and roll, doo-wop
- Years active: 1956–1962
- Labels: Time Records, Madison Records
- Past members: Carl Bonura; John Casey; Ray Ceroni; Lenny Giambalvo; Peter Kane

The Bell Notes were an early American rock and roll group from the East Meadow area of Long Island, New York.

The Bell Notes were regular performers in The Bronx in the 1950s, and performed at a bar owned by the father of Ray Tabano; he and Steven Tyler (of Aerosmith) occasionally played between Bell Notes sets, and covered their song "I've Had It". New York DJ (WADO) Alan Fredericks saw the group play at a record hop on Long Island and saw the group's potential. In 1958, he recorded "I've Had It" at a recording studio in Times Square, New York. The session cost a total of $50. He peddled the song around town and the group was eventually signed by Bob Shad. He was starting up a new label and thought the band would be ideal, because of the raw sound of the recording and the catchy tune. "I've Had It", released on Time Records, was a nationwide hit in the U.S. in March 1959, peaking at No. 6 on the Billboard Hot 100. They released four further singles in 1959 – "Old Spanish Town", "That's Right", "You're a Big Girl Now", and "White Buckskin Sneakers & Checkerboard Socks" – but only "Old Spanish Town" charted, peaking at No. 76.

The band was managed by Natalie Fredericks.

In 1960, they signed with Madison Records and released two singles,"Shortnin' Bread" and "Friendly Star" followed. "Shortnin' Bread" hit No. 96 in the U.S. and was their last hit; they broke up by 1962.

In 1959, the group appeared in the series of Nu-Trading Rock 'n Roll Trading Cards.

== Members ==
- Carl Bonura – vocals, saxophone
- John Casey – drums
- Ray Ceroni – vocals, guitar
- Lenny Giambalvo – bass
- Peter Kane – piano

== Discography ==
=== Singles ===
Year	Title	Peak chart positions		Record Label	B-side
Year	Title	US Pop	US R&B	Record Label	B-side
1958	"I've Had It"	6	19	Time Records	"Be Mine"
1959	"Old Spanish Town"	76	—	Time Records	"She Went That-A-Way"
1959	"That's Right"	—	—	Time Records	"Betty Dear"
1959	"You're a Big Girl Now"	—	—	Time Records	"Don't Ask Me Why"
1959	"White Buckskin Sneakers and Checkerboard Socks"	—	—	Time Records	"No Dice"
1960	"Shortnin' Bread"	96	—	Madison Records	"To Each His Own"
1960	"Real Wild Child"	—	—	Madison Records	"Friendly Star"
