= Venus (Frankie Avalon song) =

1959 song written by Ed Marshall

- 1959 US single

Single by Frankie Avalon
- B-side: "I'm Broke"
- Released: January 1959
- Genre: Pop
- Length: 2:20
- Label: Chancellor
- Songwriter: Ed Marshall

Frankie Avalon singles chronology
"What Little Girl" / "I'll Wait for You" (1958)	"Venus" (1959)	"Bobby Sox to Stockings" / "A Boy Without a Girl" (1959)

Audio
- "Venus" (1959) on YouTube

"Venus"
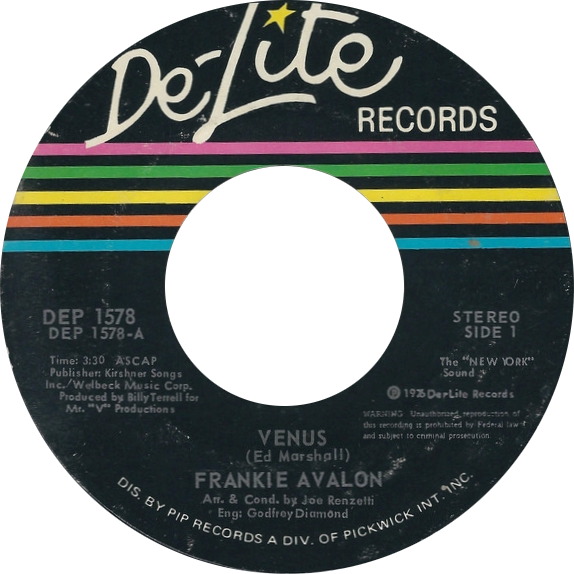
- US single of Avalon's 1976 re-recording

Single by Frankie Avalon
- Released: 1976
- Genre: Pop, disco
- Length: 3:34
- Label: De-Lite, Polydor
- Songwriter: Ed Marshall

Frankie Avalon singles chronology
"Thank You for That Extra Sunrise" (1975)	"Venus" (1976)	"Splish Splash" (1976)

Audio
- "Venus" (1976 re-recording; long disco version) on YouTube

"Venus" is a song written by Ed Marshall and popularized by Frankie Avalon, whose recording was released in 1959 and spent five weeks at number one on the Billboard Hot 100. The lyrics detail a man's plea to Venus, the Roman goddess of love and beauty, to send him a girl to love and one who will love him as well.

== Frankie Avalon recordings ==
=== 1959 version ===
Songwriter Ed Marshall first offered "Venus" to Al Martino, who liked it but only felt it qualified as an album cut. Marshall then played it on the piano for Frankie Avalon, who recalled, "I listened to it, and the first time it just caught me immediately." He recorded it three days later with producers Peter De Angelis and Bob Marcucci. In a live telephone interview on American Bandstand a couple of days afterward, Avalon told Dick Clark that it would be a hit. The single was released a week later.

=== Chart performance ===
"Venus" debuted on Billboard magazine's Hot 100 chart in the issue dated February 9, 1959, and reached number one in the March 9 issue, four weeks later. It spent a total of 28 weeks on the chart, five of which were in the top spot. The song also reached number 10 on the magazine's R&B chart. The magazine ranked it as the number four song for 1959.

=== Charts ===
==== Weekly charts ====
Weekly chart performance for "Venus" by Frankie Avalon
Chart (1959)	Peak position
Belgium (Ultratop 50 Flanders)	2
Belgium (Ultratop 50 Wallonia)	1
UK New Musical Express	16
US Billboard Hot 100	1
US Billboard Hot R&B Sides	10

==== Year-end charts ====
Year-end chart performance for "Venus" by Frankie Avalon
Chart (1959)	Position
US Billboard Hot 100	4

==== All-time charts ====
All-time chart performance for "Venus" by Frankie Avalon
Chart (1958–2018)	Position
US Billboard Hot 100	154

=== 1976 version ===
In 1976, Avalon released a new disco version of "Venus" that was Avalon's last Billboard Hot 100 hit, peaking at number 46 there and at number one on the magazine's Easy Listening chart. Avalon was quoted as saying of the remake: "It was all right, but I still prefer the original."

=== Charts ===
==== Weekly charts ====
Weekly chart performance for "Venus" (disco version) by Frankie Avalon
Chart (1976)	Peak position
Canada Top Singles (RPM)	78
Canada Adult Contemporary (RPM)	17
US Billboard Hot 100 (Billboard)	46
US Billboard Easy Listening	1

== Other charting versions ==
- Dickie Valentine enter the UK singles chart on March 19, 1959, with his recording and got as high as number 20 during his eight weeks there.
- Johnny Mathis reached number 23 on Billboard's Easy Listening chart and "bubbled under" the Billboard Hot 100 chart to number 111 in 1968.
- Jamie Redfern peaked at number 9 on the Go-Set Australian charts in 1973.

== See also ==
- List of Hot 100 number-one singles of 1959 (U.S.)
- List of number-one adult contemporary singles of 1976 (U.S.)

== Bibliography ==
- Bronson, Fred (2003), The Billboard Book of Number One Hits, Billboard Books, ISBN 9780823076772
- Whitburn, Joel (2007), Joel Whitburn Presents Billboard Top Adult Songs, 1961-2006, Record Research Inc., ISBN 978-0898201697
- Whitburn, Joel (2009), Joel Whitburn's Top Pop Singles, 1955-2008, Record Research Inc., ISBN 978-0-89820-180-2
