= Reg Owen =

British composer (1921–1978)

Reg Owen (3 February 1921 – 23 May 1978) was an English conductor and arranger.

Owen was born George Owen Smith in Hackney, London, and began playing the saxophone at the age of 15. He played in local groups such as Teddy Joyce's Juveniles and the Royal Kiltie Juniors, before founding his own ensemble whilst still in his teens. Owen studied with Benny Glassman and then attended the Royal College of Music. During World War II, he played in the Bomber Command Band of the RAF, then arranged for Ted Heath and Cyril Stapleton after 1945. In 1954, he had his name legally changed to Reginald Owen. He published a book, the Reg Owen Arranging Method, in 1956, and began writing film scores in 1957, including for Date with Disaster (1957), There's Always a Thursday (1957), Payroll (1961) and Very Important Person (1961). In 1959, he had a top 10 hit in the U.S. with "Manhattan Spiritual", which peaked at number 10 on the Billboard Hot 100. The same track reached number 20 in the UK Singles Chart in March 1959. A further track, "Obsession", peaked at number 43 in the UK in October 1960.

In 1961, Owen moved to Brussels, working as a composer, conductor, and arranger throughout continental Europe. He moved to Spain in the 1970s, and died at the Clinica Limonar in Málaga, on 23 May 1978 at the age of 57.

== Recordings ==
Owen recorded several records under 'Reg Owen' and the 'Reg Owen Orchestra.' Most of his LPs were with RCA Records, from 1957 to 1962.
