= Mr. Blue =

Single by the Fleetwoods

from the album Mr. Blue
- B-side: "You Mean Everything to Me"
- Released: 1959
- Genre: Pop
- Length: 2:26
- Label: Dolton 5
- Songwriter: DeWayne Blackwell
- Producer: Kearney Barton

The Fleetwoods singles chronology
"Graduation's Here" (1959)	"Mr. Blue" (1959)	"You Mean Everything to Me" (1959)

"Mr. Blue" is a popular song written by DeWayne Blackwell that was a hit for the Fleetwoods, reaching number one on the Billboard Hot 100 in November 1959, giving the group its second chart-topping hit of the year. Roy Lanham played guitar on the track, and Si Zentner played the trombone.

== Chart positions ==
Chart (1959)	Peak position
Canada (CHUM Hit Parade)	1
Italy	7
U.S. Billboard Hot 100	1
U.S. Billboard Hot R&B Sides	3

== Other versions ==
- The song was covered in 1959 by David MacBeth, whose Joe Meek produced version reached number 18 on the UK Singles Chart, spending one week in the Top 20.
- Bob Dylan demoed the song with The Band in a recording that is featured on The Bootleg Series Vol. 11: The Basement Tapes Complete. He also performed the song live 26 times in 2024.
- Garth Brooks recorded the song in 1990 on his album No Fences.
- Village People construction worker David Hodo performed the song as "Kid Danger and the Skirts" on the first season of Star Search in 1983. He won his heat, but was defeated in the final by country band Sawyer Brown. The performance can be viewed on YouTube.

== Pop culture ==
=== Films ===
- National Lampoon's Vacation (briefly)
- Diner, in which the song is played in the background while characters converse at the restaurant and the film's action takes place a few weeks after the release of the song.
- A Brighter Summer Day (briefly)
- Captain America: Brave New World, in which Dr. Samuel Sterns / Leader (Tim Blake Nelson) created a form of mind control—which he used on various characters, including Isaiah Bradley—by using flashes of light to plant commands into their subconscious and using the song as a trigger to activate them. Sterns chose this song because he previously used the name "Mr. Blue" as an alias when communicating with Bruce Banner in The Incredible Hulk.

=== Television Series ===
- Watchmen

== See also ==
- List of Hot 100 number-one singles of 1959 (U.S.)
