= Frankie Avalon =

American actor and singer (born 1940)

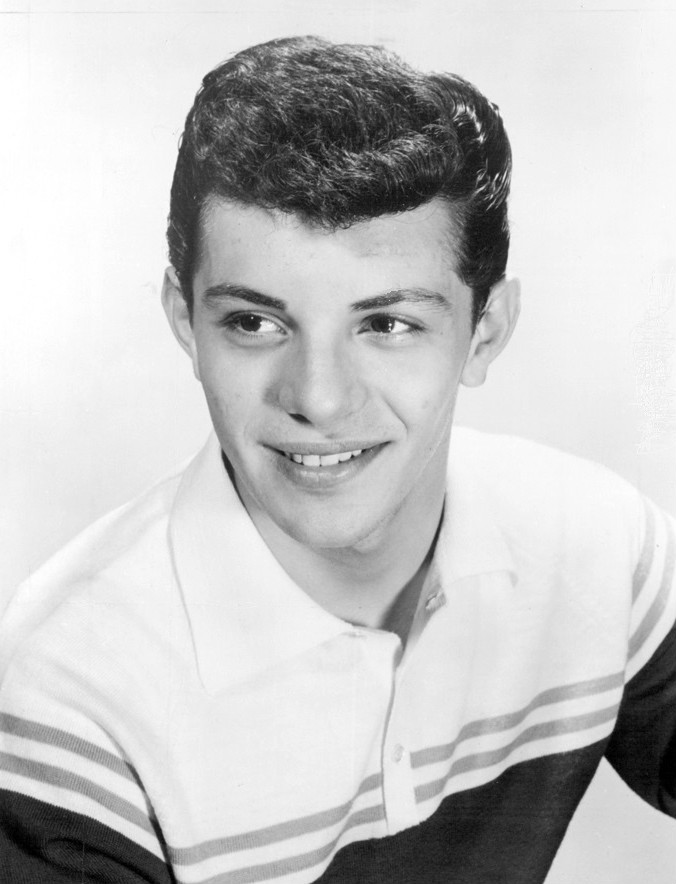
- Avalon in 1959
- Born: Francis Thomas Avallone; September 18, 1940 (age 86); Philadelphia, Pennsylvania, U.S.
- Occupations: Singer, actor
- Years active: 1952–present
- Spouse: Kathryn Diebel (m. 1963)
- Children: 8
- Musical career
- Genres: Pop; rock and roll; jazz; swing
- Instruments: Vocals, trumpet
- Website: www.frankieavalon.com

Francis Thomas Avallone (born September 18, 1940), known professionally as Frankie Avalon, is an American singer, actor and former teen idol. He had 31 charting U.S. Billboard singles from 1958 to late 1962, including number one hits, "Venus" in 1959 and "Why" in 1960.

Avalon started appearing in films in the 1960s; he is well known for having appeared in the Beach party films of this decade and for supporting roles in the 1960 western The Alamo and in the 1978 musical film Grease. In the latter film, he sings the song "Beauty School Dropout".

== Early life and education ==
Avalon was born in Philadelphia, Pennsylvania, the son of Italian-American parents Mary and Nicholas Avallone. His mother was originally from Sicily. His father was a butcher who was born in Philadelphia, whose father Francesco was from Salerno, in Campania, Italy, and whose mother was from Sicily.

== Career ==
=== 1950s ===
In December 1952, Avalon made his American network television debut playing the trumpet in The Honeymooners "Christmas Party" sketch on The Jackie Gleason Show. Two singles showcasing Avalon's trumpet playing were issued on RCA Victor's X sublabel in 1954. His trumpet playing was also featured on some of his LP songs as well. As a teenager, he played with Bobby Rydell in Rocco and the Saints.

In 1959, "Venus", which was a number one single for five consecutive weeks, and "Why" went to number one on the Billboard Hot 100. "Why" was the first number one hit of the 1960s.

Avalon had 31 charted U.S. Billboard singles from 1958 to late 1962, including "Just Ask Your Heart" (U.S. No. 7), "I'll Wait for You" (U.S. No. 5), "Bobby Sox to Stockings" (U.S. No. 8), and "A Boy Without a Girl" (U.S. No. 10). He was less popular in the UK, but did still manage four chart hits with "Why", "Ginger Bread", "Venus" and "Don't Throw Away All Those Teardrops". Most of his hit songs were written and/or produced by Bob Marcucci, head of Chancellor Records. Avalon concentrated on his acting career which detracted from his recording career, and "Why" of 1959 would be Avalon's final top 10 hit.

Avalon's first film was a short appearance in Jamboree (1957), playing a trumpet and singing "Teacher's Pet".

In the late 1950s, teen idols were often given roles in films, supporting older male stars in order to attract a younger audience, such as Ricky Nelson in Rio Bravo (1959). Alan Ladd's daughter was a Frankie Avalon fan, who recommended that he co-star with her father in the Western Guns of the Timberland (1960). Avalon sings two songs, "The Faithful Kind" and "Gee Whiz Whillikins Golly Gee"; both were released as singles.

Ladd announced he would reteam Avalon and his daughter in Six Steps to Freedom but the film was never made.

=== 1960s ===
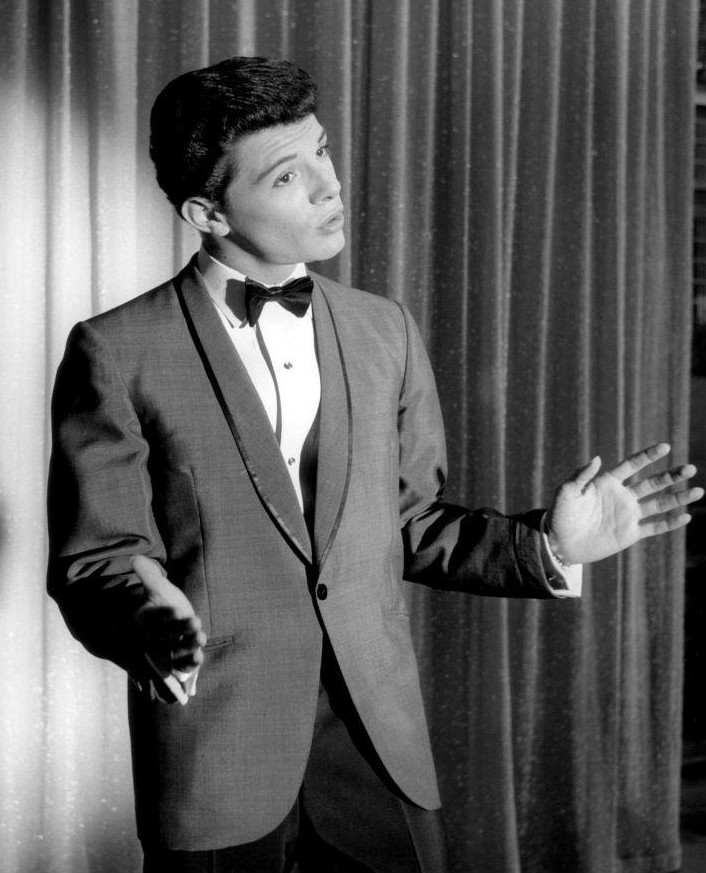
Avalon performing in 1960

Rushes for Timberland were seen by John Wayne, who was looking for a young actor to play the (fictitious) role of "Smitty" in his passion project, The Alamo (1960). Avalon was cast in his second dramatic part. After making the film Wayne told the press: "We're not cutting one bit of any scene in which Frankie appears. I believe he is the finest young talent I've seen in a long time." "Mr Wayne said I was natural as far as acting goes," said Avalon. He added: "My ambition when I was ten years old was to have my own band like Harry James. I never expected anything like this... I'd like to be identified as a singer, dancer, and actor. I don't want to be just one thing."

"I like to appeal to teenagers and adults," he said in 1960. "Everybody".

Avalon was now in demand as an actor. He provided the singing voice for the lead character in the English-language version of a Japanese musical anime, Alakazam the Great (1960), which was done at the behest of the US distributor, American International Pictures. It was the first in what would be a long association with that company.

For Irwin Allen, Avalon had a small role and sang the title song in the science fiction adventure film, Voyage to the Bottom of the Sea (1961), a solid commercial hit. He had a supporting role in a comedy, Sail a Crooked Ship (1961).

Avalon was teamed with Ray Milland in the science fiction film, Panic in Year Zero! (1962), written by Lou Rusoff. Samuel Z. Arkoff of American International Pictures (AIP) said Avalon and Milland were teamed together because "they both have particular types of followers and the combination adds up to an attraction".

For AIP, Avalon made a war film with Tab Hunter, Operation Bikini (1963), singing a few songs in flashback. At MGM, he played the lead in an adventure film set in Africa, Drums of Africa (1963).

Of more significance for Avalon's career was a project originally written by Rusoff, Beach Party (1963). This cheerful pop rock-and-roll musical comedy starred Annette Funicello and was directed by William Asher. Arkoff said AIP originally wanted Fabian Forte to co-star with Funicello, but when he proved unavailable, they went with Avalon; it was a big hit and led to several sequels. Filmink wrote "Avalon's warm persona and slightly cartoonish vibe were ideal for the beach party movies, with their in-jokes, double-takes, songs and silliness."

Avalon received an offer to appear in a swashbuckler set in 10th century Spain about Fernán González of Castile, The Castilian (1963). This was followed by the Beach Party sequel, Muscle Beach Party (1963), which proved to be popular. Even more so was the third in the film series Bikini Beach (1964), where Avalon had a dual role. In August 1964, Avalon announced he had signed to make 10 films in five years for AIP.

Pajama Party (1964) was the unofficial fourth film in the series; it was a science fiction spoof in which Avalon ceded the leading man duties to Tommy Kirk, retaining a cameo. He was back as the leading man in Beach Blanket Bingo (1965). He later recalled: "That's the picture of mine that I think people remember best, and it was just a lot of kids having a lot of fun ... a picture about young romance and about the opposition of adults and old people ... also fun because we got to learn how to fake skydive out of an airplane."

Avalon also appeared in nearly two dozen TV episodes, including ABC's The Bing Crosby Show and The Patty Duke Show, appearing often as himself. Later, he became a national television spokesperson for Sonic Drive-In. In 1965, he appeared in the Combat! TV series episode "Brother, Brother" as a childhood friend of Pfc. Kirby, played by Jack Hogan. Avalon and Tuesday Weld supported Bob Hope in the comedy film, I'll Take Sweden (1965) for Edward Small.

According to Filmink AIP gave "Avalon three terrific non-beach chances in 1965–the studio really looked after him with a series of roles that were utterly perfect for the singer." These were Ski Party, Sergeant Deadhead, and Dr Goldfoot and the Bikini Machine. Ski Party teamed him with Dwayne Hickman and was copy of Some Like It Hot (1959). Sergeant Deadhead (1965) was a military comedy with Avalon in another dual role. He had a cameo on How to Stuff a Wild Bikini (1965). The box office performance of these last few films was disappointing, especially Sergeant Deadhead, for which sequels had been planned. More popular was AIP's Dr. Goldfoot and the Bikini Machine (1965), a comedy with Vincent Price and Hickman. This was liked well enough to justify a sequel, although Avalon did not appear; Fabian Forte took over the Avalon role. In January 1966, Avalon said he no longer wanted to make beach films. "Even a seagull leaves the beach from time to time, and I'm getting a little sick of sand."

AIP tried to find a new starring formula for Avalon, casting him as a stock car driver in Fireball 500 (1966), alongside Fabian and Funicello, for director William Asher. It was a medium financial success and led to other AIP stock car films, though none had Avalon starring in them. For Harry Alan Towers and AIP he played the lead role in The Million Eyes of Sumuru (1967), and also had a solid role in Skidoo (1968), a comedy from Otto Preminger. In England, he was in AIP's The Haunted House of Horror (1968). Filmink argued Skidoo "essentially killed Avalon's career as a movie star."

=== 1970s ===
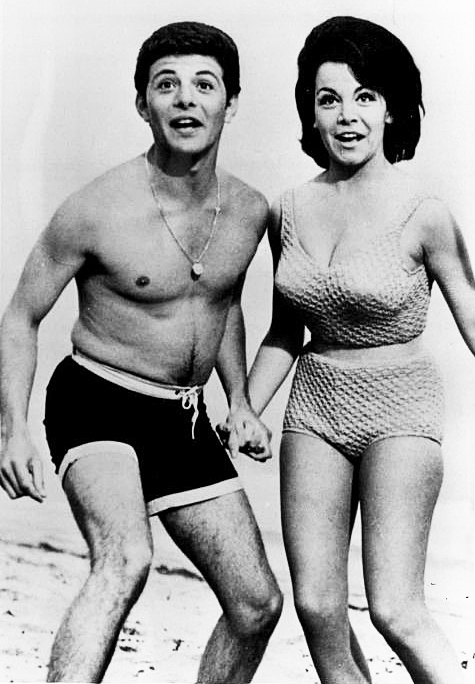
Avalon and Annette Funicello during the Beach Party era, c. 1965

In the early 1970s Avalon unsuccessfully tried to seek finance for a biopic on Willie Pep. He appeared in fewer movies. Filmink argued "his great strength as a performer (his individuality), was limiting for him as a movie star."

In 1976, Avalon updated his song "Venus" with a new disco treatment. Materializing as a character called Teen Angel, his performance of "Beauty School Dropout" in the hit 1978 film of the musical Grease introduced Avalon to a new generation of viewers. Frankie Valli, who had turned the role down in favor of singing the theme song, noted that both he and Avalon earned substantial profits and a boost in their careers from their work on the film.

In early 1979, Avalon portrayed Sergei in the episode "Dewey and Harold and Sarah and Maggie" of the NBC television series $weepstake$.

=== 1980s ===
The 1980 film The Idolmaker, written by Ed Di Lorenzo and directed by Taylor Hackford, was a thinly-disguised biography of Avalon ("Tommy Dee" in the film) as well as 1950s teenage star Fabian Forte (called "Caesare" in the film), along with songwriter/producer Bob Marcucci (called "Vinnie Vacarri"). In the film, Dee clashes with the record producer and younger singer Caesare, who he feels threatens his career. Eventually, Dee and Caesare quit the label, but their record careers collapse just as the British Invasion begins. The real Fabian threatened a lawsuit, despite the filmmakers' insistence that the film presented only fictional characters (though Marcucci was a paid consultant). Avalon denied most of the film's events.

In 1980, Avalon appeared in the film Blood Song as Paul Foley, a serial killer. The movie was shot in October–November 1980 in North Bend/Coos Bay, Oregon. It was released in October 1982.

Avalon also appeared in the Happy Days episode "Poobah Doo Dah" playing himself where he sings his hits "Venus" and "Why".

Avalon had the idea of returning to beach party films with Funicello. He hired several screenwriters and shopped the screenplay around town, eventually managing to set up the project at Paramount Pictures. Back to the Beach (1987) was a moderate success.

In 1989, Avalon and Funicello appeared as themselves in cameo roles, out jogging the streets in Troop Beverly Hills. Not long afterward Funicello retired, having been diagnosed with multiple sclerosis.

Avalon then turned to marketing and created Frankie Avalon Products, a line of health and cosmetic aids. He promoted his products on the Home Shopping Network.

=== 1990s ===
Avalon made a cameo appearance as himself with Robert De Niro in the 1995 film, Casino.

=== 2000s ===
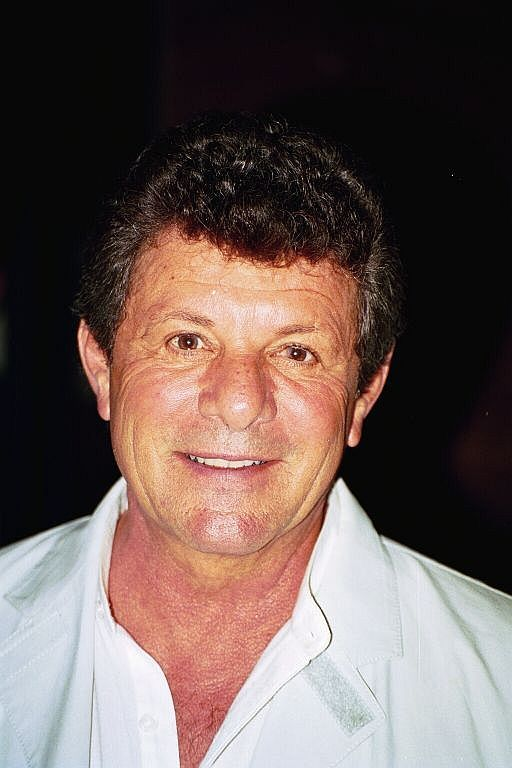
Avalon in 2018

Avalon has starred in stage productions of Grease in the role of Teen Angel and in Tony n' Tina's Wedding as a caricature of himself. In 2001, he appeared as himself in the Sabrina the Teenage Witch episode 'Beach Blanket Bizarro.'

Additionally, in 2007, he performed "Beauty School Dropout" with the four remaining female contenders (Kathleen Monteleone, Allie Schulz, Ashley Spencer, and winner Laura Osnes) for the role of Sandy on the NBC television reality show Grease: You're the One that I Want!.

On April 8, 2009, Avalon performed on American Idol.

As part of a long-running concert tour, Avalon has toured with fellow Philadelphian early 1960s teen idols Fabian and Bobby Rydell under the banner "Dick Fox's Golden Boys".

=== 2010s ===
A cookbook with over 80 recipes from St. Martin's Press, Frankie Avalon's Italian Family Cookbook, was published in 2015.

=== 2020s ===
On October 18, 2021, Avalon performed on Dancing with the Stars. In 2024, he teamed up with Tommy Cono for a new version of "Beauty School Dropout". Cono, who shared some mutual friends with Avalon, succeeded the late Bobby Rydell in the Dick Fox's Golden Boys tour in 2025.

== Personal life ==
Avalon married Kathryn "Kay" Diebel on January 19, 1963. She was a beauty pageant winner.

The Avalons have eight children and ten grandchildren. His son, Frankie Jr., is a former actor who appeared in the original The Karate Kid.

== Legacy and popular culture references ==
Avalon was mentioned in the System of a Down song "Old School Hollywood". The song supposedly is about Daron Malakian's experience in a celebrity baseball game, where he and Avalon were both ignored.

Avalon is also mentioned in "It Takes Two", a song from the hit musical Hairspray, sung by the character Link Larkin, and in a song by the Wu-Tang Clan called "The City" which refers to his experiences of being a big part of the beach party film genre ("Ride the wave like Frankie Avalon").

One of numerous obscure cultural references present in Midway's video game Mortal Kombat 3 was a lo-res image of Frankie Avalon's face that would dart up in the lower right-hand corner of the screen when Goro killed his opponent by knocking him into the spike pit on the Bridge level.

His song "Venus" was featured in Cranium Command (1989–2005), an attraction at Epcot's Wonders of Life Pavilion (now closed) at Walt Disney World. In the attraction, a 12-year-old boy named Bobby (Scott Curtis), tries to survive the pressures of life and falls in love with a beautiful girl named Annie (Natalie Gregory) at school.

Avalon and his song "Venus" are mentioned in Wendy Wasserstein's 2005 play Third. The main character, English professor Laurie Jameson, watches a PBS reunion show featuring Avalon singing the song, and sings a line of it to her daughter. In stage productions of the show, part of the song is played and a portion of the supposed PBS special is screened as part of the scenery.

Avalon is also referenced in the 1994 film, The Stöned Age, in which he makes an ending scene cameo appearance.

His song "Venus" additionally appeared in season 4 of the TV series Dexter in which John Lithgow's character, Arthur Mitchell, plays it to remember his deceased sister. Also, "Venus" is sampled in Nick Bertke's, single, "J'Adore Juin", a mashup of sounds from the movie The Apartment. "Venus" also appeared in the 2016 film 10 Cloverfield Lane starring John Goodman.

Avalon is also mentioned in The Vaccines' song "Teenage Icon".

== Acting roles ==
- 1956 The Honeymooners as Himself
- 1957 Jamboree as Himself
- 1960 Guns of the Timberland as Bert Harvey
- 1960 Alakazam the Great as Alakazam (English version, singing voice)
- 1960 The Alamo as Smitty
- 1961 Voyage to the Bottom of the Sea as Lieutenant Junior Grade Danny Romano
- 1961 Sail a Crooked Ship as Ensign Rodney J. Foglemeyer
- 1962 Panic in Year Zero! as Rick Baldwin
- 1962–1963 The Eleventh Hour (TV series, in episode entitled "A Tumble from a High White House") as Larry Thatcher
- 1963 Operation Bikini as Seaman Joseph Malzone
- 1963 The Jack Benny Program (TV series, episode: "The Frankie Avalon Show") as Himself
- 1963 The Patty Duke Show (TV series, episode: "How to Be Popular")
- 1963 The Castilian as Jerifán
- 1963 Drums of Africa as Brian Ferrers
- 1963 Beach Party as Frankie
- 1963 Rawhide (TV series) as Billy Farragut
- 1963 Mr. Novak (TV series, in "A Thousand Voices") as David Muller
- 1964 Muscle Beach Party as Frankie
- 1964 Bikini Beach as Frankie / Potato Bug
- 1964 Pajama Party as Socum
- 1965 Combat! (TV series) as Eddie Cane
- 1965 Beach Blanket Bingo as Frankie
- 1965 I'll Take Sweden as Kenny Klinger
- 1965 Ski Party as Todd Armstrong
- 1965 How to Stuff a Wild Bikini as Frankie
- 1965 The Patty Duke Show (TV series, episode: "A Foggy Day in Brooklyn Heights") as Himself
- 1965 Sergeant Deadhead as Sergeant O.K. Deadhead / Sergeant Donovan
- 1965 Dr. Goldfoot and the Bikini Machine as Craig Gamble
- 1966 Fireball 500 as Dave Owens
- 1967 The Million Eyes of Sumuru as Tommy Carter
- 1967 The Lucy Show (TV series, in episode entitled "Lucy The Starmaker") as Tommy Cheever
- 1968 Skidoo as Angie
- 1969 The Haunted House of Horror as Chris
- 1971 Love, American Style (TV series) as Henry (segment "Love and the Tuba")
- 1974 The Take as Danny James
- 1978 Grease as Teen Angel
- 1978 The Love Boat (TV series, in the episode "Memories of You/Computerman/Parlez Vous?") as Nick Heider
- 1982 Blood Song as Paul Foley
- 1982 Happy Days (TV series, in the episode "Poobah Doo Dah") as Himself
- 1982 Madame's Place (TV series, in the episode "The Common Fighting Machine") as Himself
- 1987 Back to the Beach as Annette's Husband
- 1988 Christmas at Pee Wee's Playhouse (TV movie) as Himself
- 1989 Troop Beverly Hills as Himself
- 1991 Full House (TV series, in the episode "Joey Goes Hollywood") as Himself
- 1992 Twist (documentary)
- 1994 The Stoned Age as Himself
- 1995 Casino as Himself
- 1996 Renegade – (TV series, in the episode "High Rollers") as Dan Travis
- 2001 Sabrina the Teenage Witch – (TV series, in the Season 5 episode "Beach Blanket Bizarro") as Himself
- 2007 Charlie Gracie Fabulous (documentary)
- 2007 The Wages of Spin (documentary)
- 2007 Mr. Warmth: The Don Rickles Project (documentary)
- 2018 Papa as Jack Freidman
