= Chancellor Records =

Chancellor Records was an indie record label based in Philadelphia. It was distributed as an imprint of ABC-Paramount Records, and was an integral part of the teen idol and rock and roll craze of the 1950s and 1960s.

Its first hit was "With All My Heart" sung by Jodie Sands (1957), but the major artists the label was famous for were Frankie Avalon and Fabian Forte, and later Claudine Clark. The studio drummer for Chancellor Records was Charles Pasco who played for all of the artists that recorded there. The label was owned by Bob Marcucci, originally with partner Peter De Angelis; Ray Sharkey played Marcucci in the movie The Idolmaker (1980).

The record label also had the imprint "Chancellor Country" which was also distributed by ABC-Paramount Records.

== See also ==
- List of record labels
