= List of Hot R&B Sides number ones of 1959 =

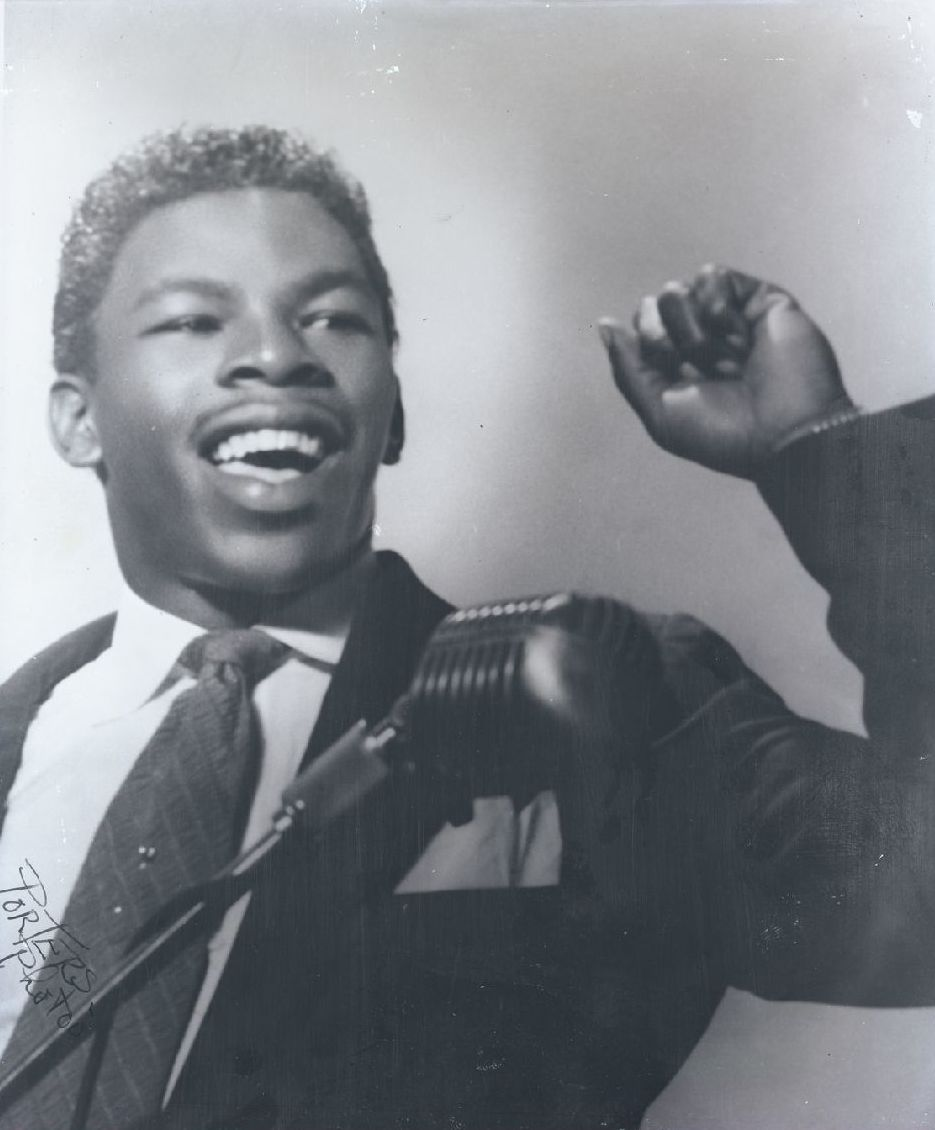
Lloyd Price was one of two artists to achieve three number ones in 1959.

In 1959, Billboard published the Hot R&B Sides chart ranking the top-performing songs in the United States in rhythm and blues (R&B) and related African American-oriented music genres; the chart has undergone various name changes over the decades to reflect the evolution of such genres and since 2005 has been published as Hot R&B/Hip-Hop Songs. During 1959, 17 different singles topped the chart, based on playlists submitted by radio stations and surveys of retail sales outlets.

In the issue of Billboard dated January 5, Jackie Wilson occupied the number-one position with "Lonely Teardrops", the song's fourth week in the top spot. The song remained atop the chart through the issue dated January 26; the following week it was displaced by "Try Me" by James Brown and the Famous Flames. This was the first number one for Brown, who would go on to become one of the most successful and influential artists in the history of black American music and to be regarded as one of the all-time greats across all genres. Brown is among seven of the year's chart-topping acts to have been inducted into the Rock and Roll Hall of Fame in recognition of their success and influence; Wilson, Lloyd Price, the Drifters, Ray Charles, Fats Domino, and the Coasters have also been inducted into the Hall of Fame.

Two vocalists achieved multiple number ones in 1959, each taking three singles to the peak position. Price reached the top spot with "Stagger Lee", "Personality" and "I'm Gonna Get Married". Although not his most successful song, "Personality" would become Price's signature song and lead to the nickname "Mr. Personality", which would be referenced in the titles of several of his albums. "Stagger Lee" was one of two songs to top the R&B chart and also the all-genre Hot 100 listing in 1959, along with "Kansas City" by Wilbert Harrison. Brook Benton also achieved three R&B chart-toppers, spending time at number one with "It's Just a Matter of Time", "Thank You Pretty Baby" and "So Many Ways". The first of the three had the year's longest unbroken run at number one, spending nine weeks in the top spot, and Benton's cumulative total of 16 weeks atop the chart was the most by any act. The year's final chart-topper was "The Clouds", an instrumental by the Spacemen, an ensemble led by pianist and bandleader Sammy Benskin. Despite reaching number one, it would prove to be the only chart entry credited to the Spacemen.

== Chart history ==
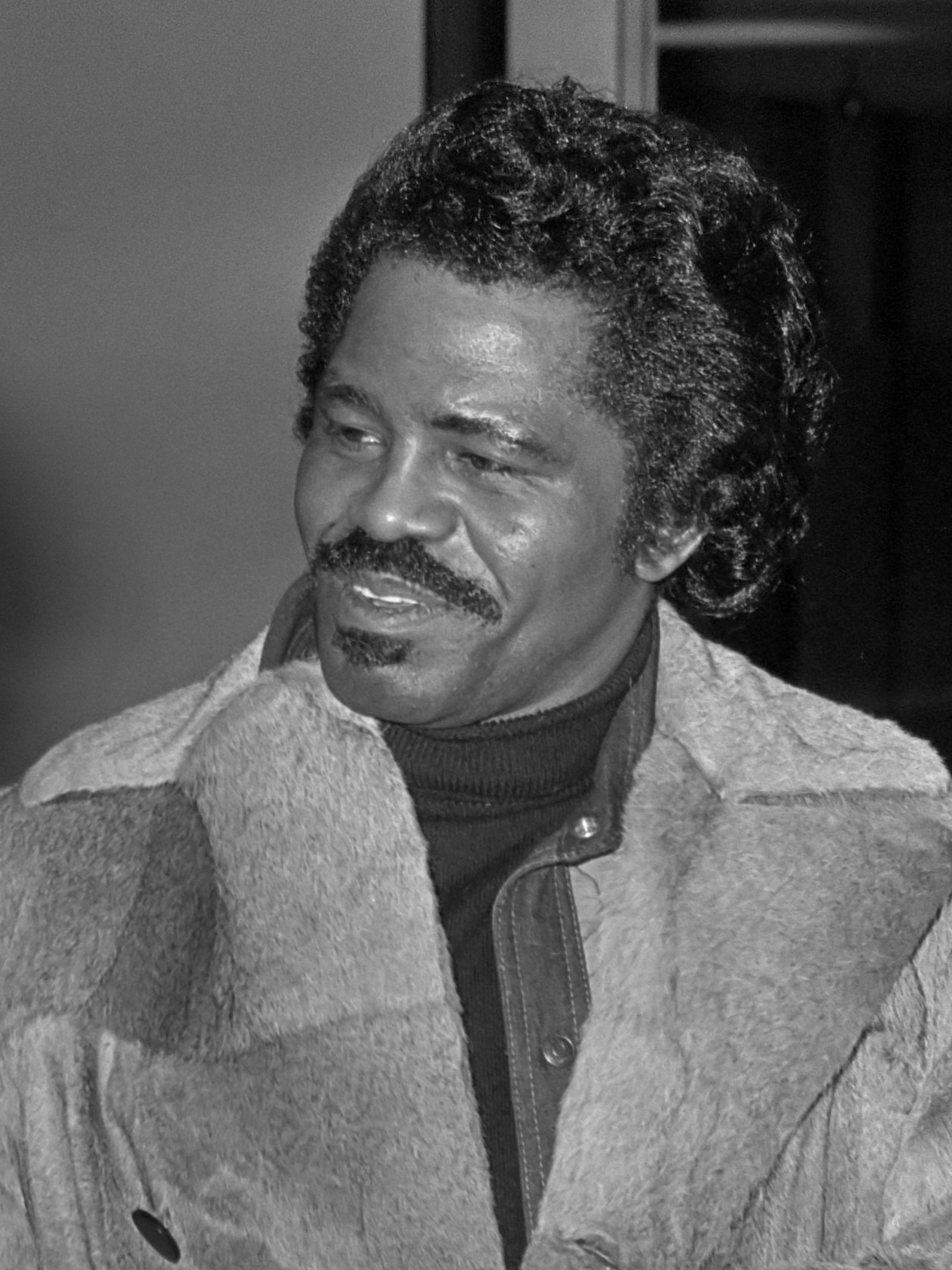
James Brown (pictured in 1977) had his first number one in 1959 with "Try Me".

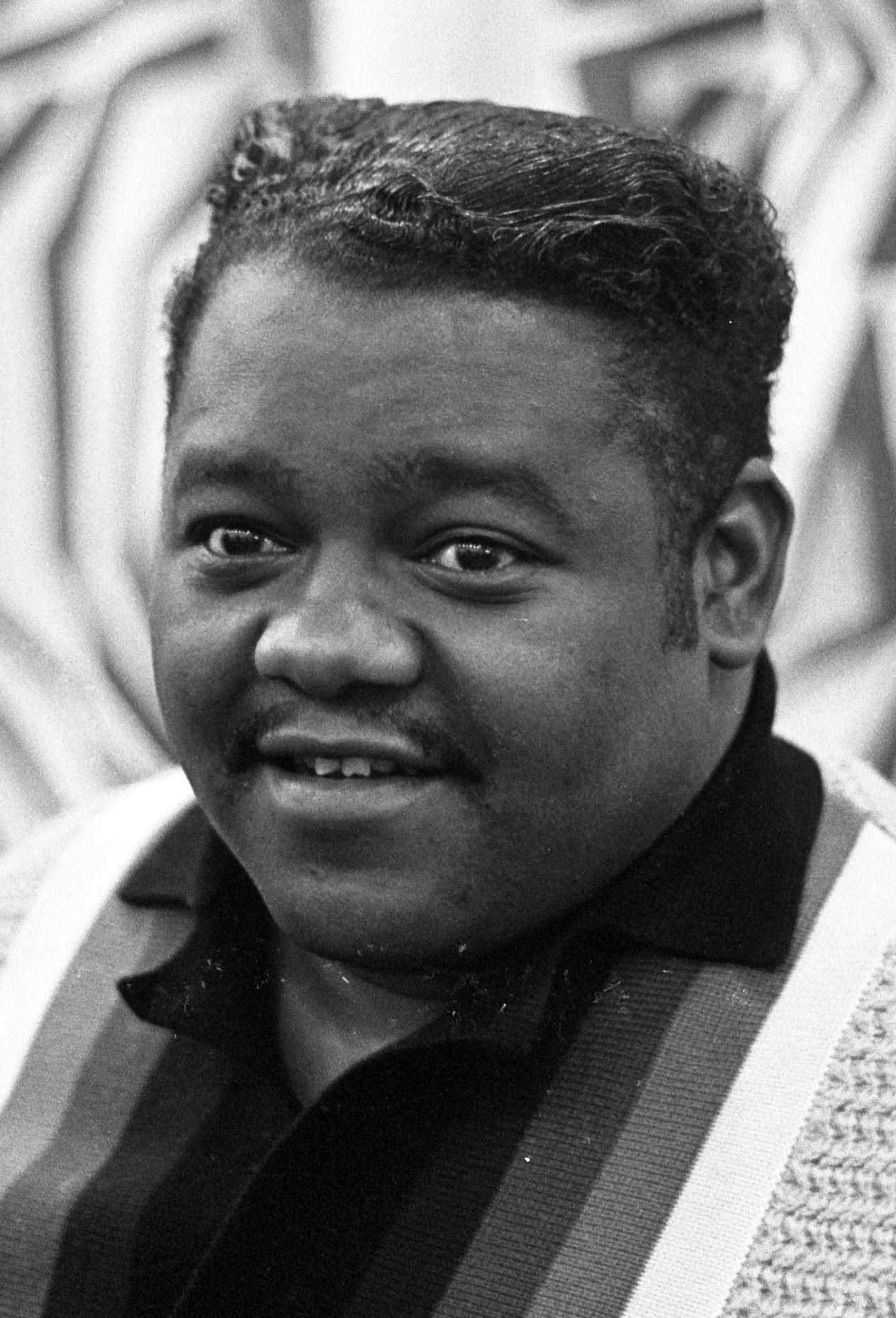
Fats Domino topped the chart with "I Want to Walk You Home".

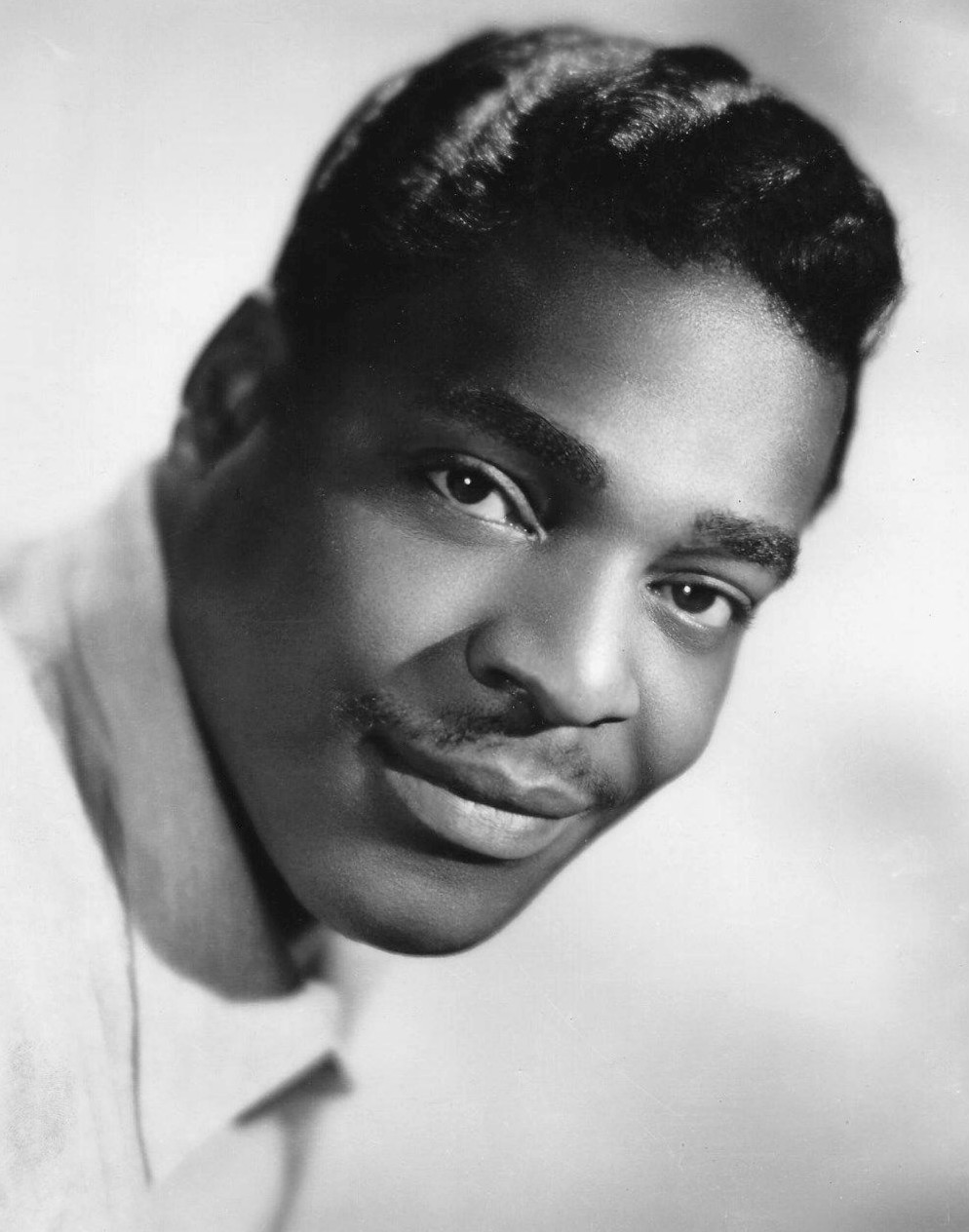
Brook Benton spent more weeks at number one than any other act in 1959.

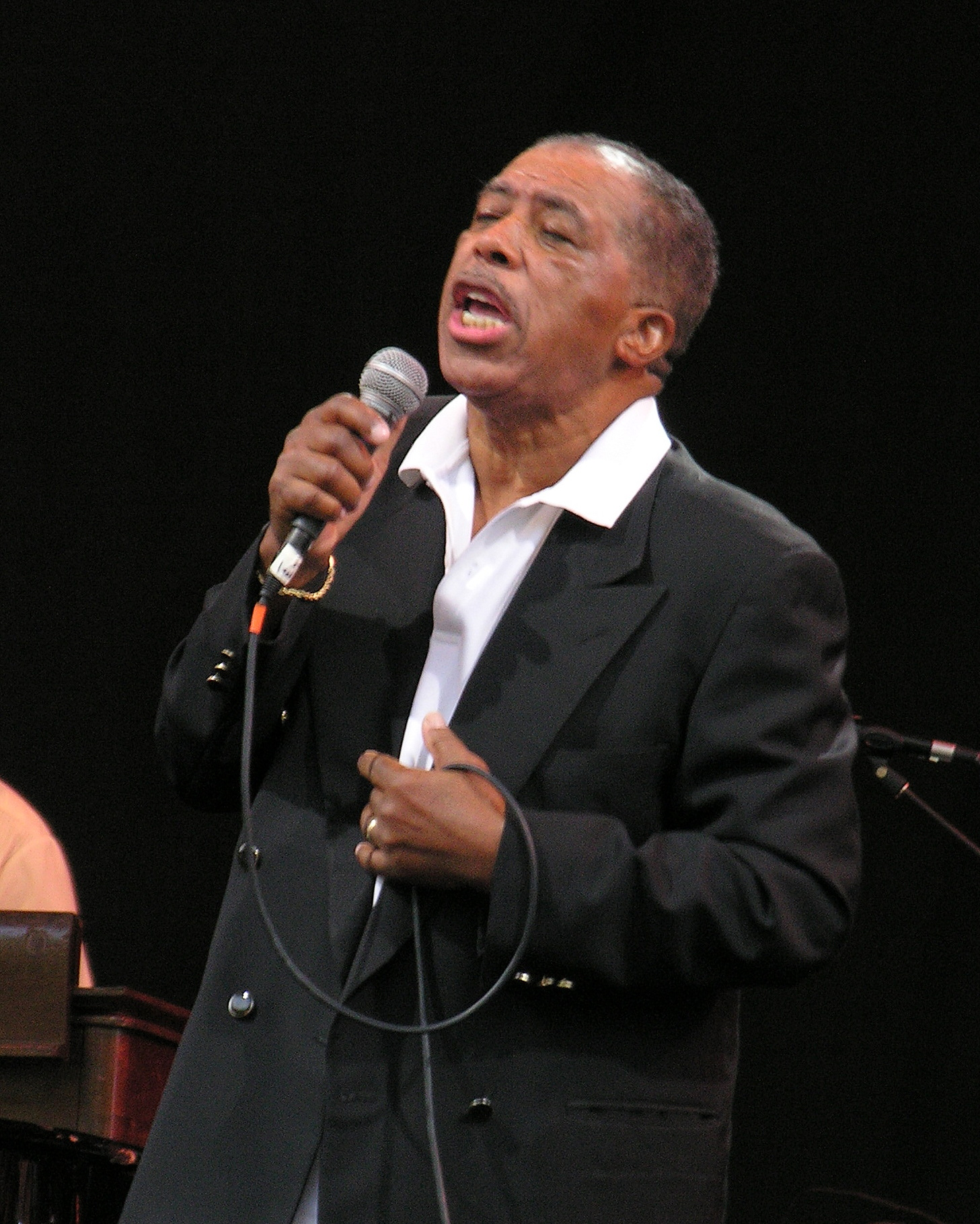
"There Goes My Baby" was the first single by the Drifters to feature Ben E. King (pictured in later life) on lead vocals.

Chart history
| Issue date | Title | Artist(s) | Ref. |
|---|---|---|---|
| January 5 | "Lonely Teardrops" | Jackie Wilson | |
| January 12 | "Lonely Teardrops" | Jackie Wilson | |
| January 19 | "Lonely Teardrops" | Jackie Wilson | |
| January 26 | "Lonely Teardrops" | Jackie Wilson | |
| February 2 | "Try Me" | James Brown and the Famous Flames | |
| February 9 | "Stagger Lee" | Lloyd Price | |
| February 16 | "Stagger Lee" | Lloyd Price | |
| February 23 | "Stagger Lee" | Lloyd Price | |
| March 2 | "Stagger Lee" | Lloyd Price | |
| March 9 | "It's Just a Matter of Time" | Brook Benton | |
| March 16 | "It's Just a Matter of Time" | Brook Benton | |
| March 23 | "It's Just a Matter of Time" | Brook Benton | |
| March 30 | "It's Just a Matter of Time" | Brook Benton | |
| April 6 | "It's Just a Matter of Time" | Brook Benton | |
| April 13 | "It's Just a Matter of Time" | Brook Benton | |
| April 20 | "It's Just a Matter of Time" | Brook Benton | |
| April 27 | "It's Just a Matter of Time" | Brook Benton | |
| May 4 | "It's Just a Matter of Time" | Brook Benton | |
| May 11 | "Kansas City" | Wilbert Harrison | |
| May 18 | "Kansas City" | Wilbert Harrison | |
| May 25 | "Kansas City" | Wilbert Harrison | |
| June 1 | "Kansas City" | Wilbert Harrison | |
| June 8 | "Kansas City" | Wilbert Harrison | |
| June 15 | "Kansas City" | Wilbert Harrison | |
| June 22 | "Kansas City" | Wilbert Harrison | |
| June 29 | "Personality" | Lloyd Price | |
| July 6 | "Personality" | Lloyd Price | |
| July 13 | "Personality" | Lloyd Price | |
| July 20 | "Personality" | Lloyd Price | |
| July 27 | "There Goes My Baby" | The Drifters | |
| August 3 | "What'd I Say (Part 1)" | Ray Charles | |
| August 10 | "Thank You Pretty Baby" | Brook Benton | |
| August 17 | "Thank You Pretty Baby" | Brook Benton | |
| August 24 | "Thank You Pretty Baby" | Brook Benton | |
| August 31 | "Thank You Pretty Baby" | Brook Benton | |
| September 7 | "I'm Gonna Get Married" | Lloyd Price | |
| September 14 | "I'm Gonna Get Married" | Lloyd Price | |
| September 21 | "I Want to Walk You Home" | Fats Domino | |
| September 28 | "I'm Gonna Get Married" | Lloyd Price | |
| October 5 | "Poison Ivy" | The Coasters | |
| October 12 | "Sea of Love" | Phil Phillips | |
| October 19 | "You Better Know It" | Jackie Wilson | |
| October 26 | "Poison Ivy" | The Coasters | |
| November 2 | "Poison Ivy" | The Coasters | |
| November 9 | "Poison Ivy" | The Coasters | |
| November 16 | "So Many Ways" | Brook Benton | |
| November 23 | "Don't You Know?" | Della Reese | |
| November 30 | "Don't You Know?" | Della Reese | |
| December 7 | "The Clouds" | The Spacemen | |
| December 14 | "So Many Ways" | Brook Benton | |
| December 21 | "So Many Ways" | Brook Benton | |
| December 28 | "The Clouds" | The Spacemen | |
