= List of Hot R&B Sides number ones of 1960 =

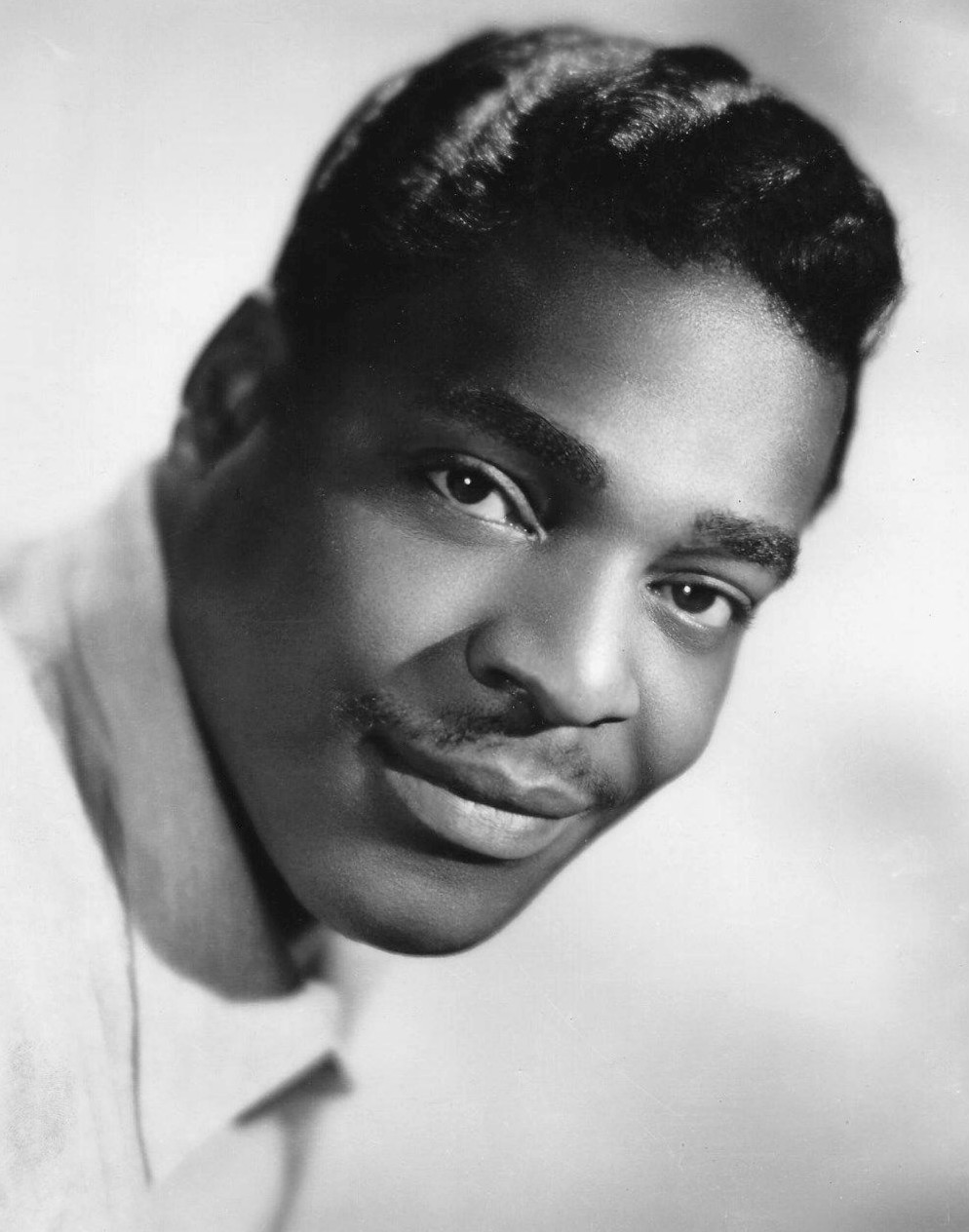
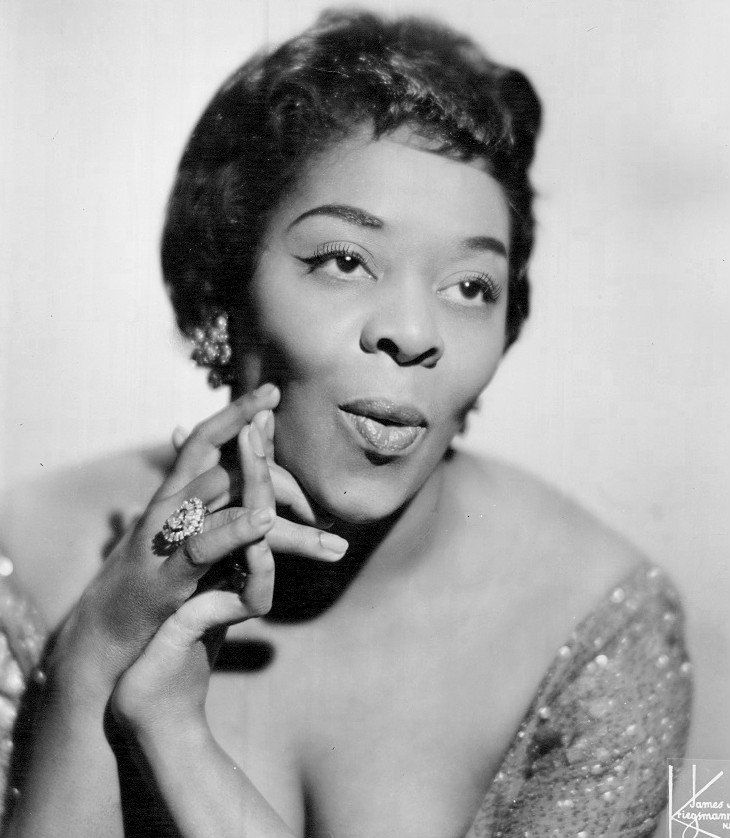
Brook Benton and Dinah Washington collaborated on two chart-toppers, including the year's longest-running number one, "Baby (You've Got What It Takes)".

In 1960, Billboard published the Hot R&B Sides chart ranking the top-performing songs in the United States in rhythm and blues (R&B) and related African American-oriented music genres; the chart has undergone various name changes over the decades to reflect the evolution of such genres and since 2005 has been published as Hot R&B/Hip-Hop Songs. During 1960, 15 different singles topped the chart, based on playlists submitted by radio stations and surveys of retail sales outlets.

In the issue of Billboard dated January 4, the top spot was held by "The Clouds" by the Spacemen, the single's third week at number one. The following week, it was displaced by "Smokie, Part 2" by Bill Black's Combo. The group led by Bill Black, best known as the bass player on Elvis Presley's early recordings, returned to number one in April with "White Silver Sands". The singles were the first two releases by Black's group to enter the R&B chart but proved to be the act's only chart-toppers; Black, the group's leader died in 1965. Buster Brown also reached number one for the first time when "Fannie Mae" spent a single week in the top spot. It was a surprise success for the harmonica player, who was nearly 50 years old and had never previously entered the chart. Bobby Marchan also achieved his first number one in 1960, as did Jerry Butler, who ended the year atop the chart with "He Will Break Your Heart".

Brook Benton spent the highest total number of weeks at number one in 1960. The singer spent nine consecutive weeks at number one with "Kiddio" between August and October and a total of 14 weeks in the top spot with two duets with Dinah Washington, "Baby (You've Got What It Takes)" and "A Rockin' Good Way (To Mess Around and Fall In Love)" for a cumulative total of 23 weeks atop the listing. Washington also achieved a solo chart-topper with "This Bitter Earth", making the two singers the only acts to achieve three number ones during 1960. "Baby (You've Got What It Takes)" was the first single to spend 10 consecutive weeks at number one since Billboard combined sales and airplay into a single R&B chart in 1958. Two of 1960's R&B number ones also topped Billboard's pop singles chart, the Hot 100: "Cathy's Clown" by the Everly Brothers and "Save the Last Dance For Me" by the Drifters.

== Chart history ==
Key
†	Indicates the number one on Billboard's year-end R&B chart of 1960

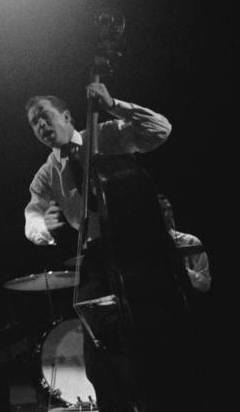
Bill Black's Combo (Black pictured) had two number ones in 1960.

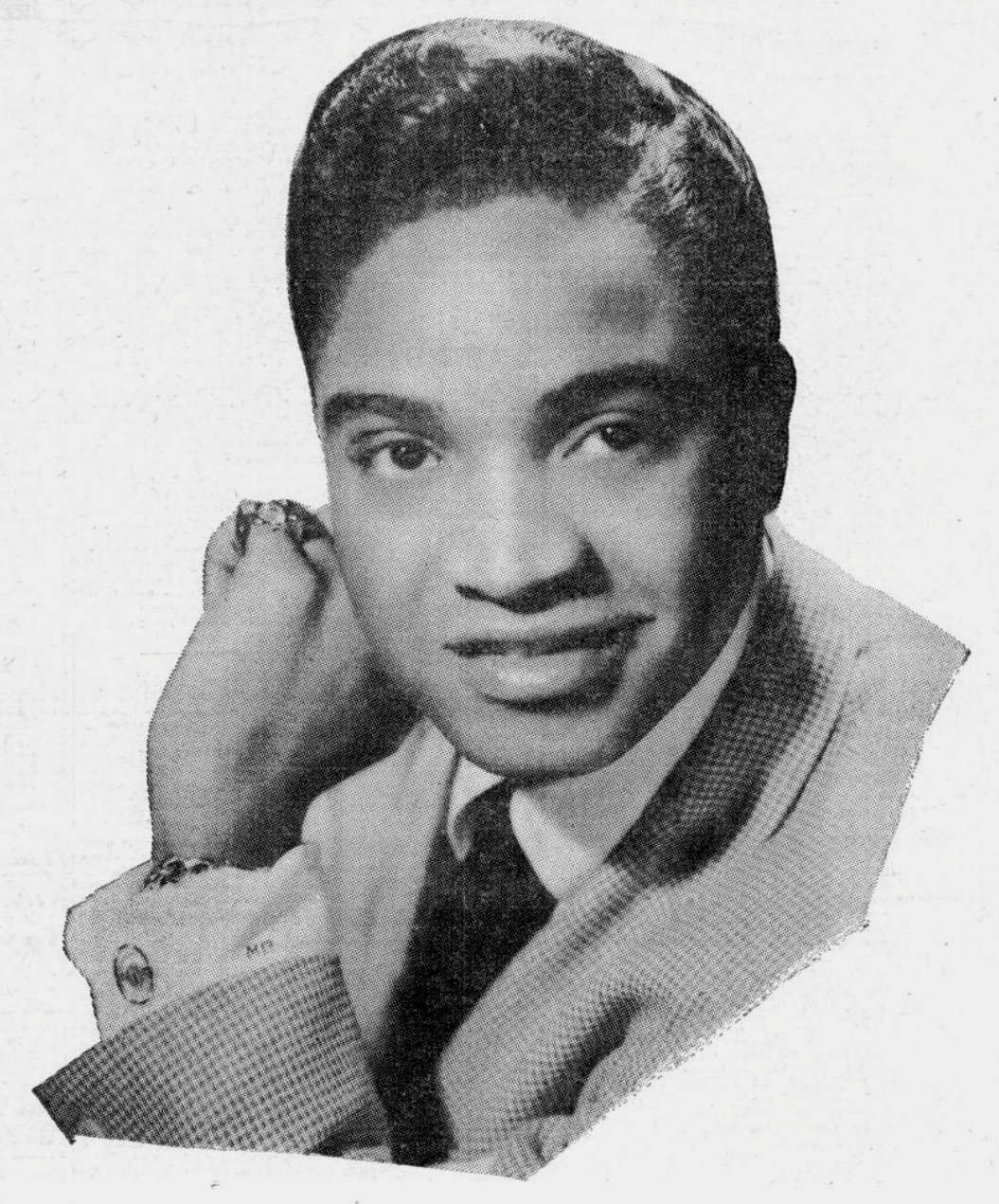
Jackie Wilson also took two singles to the top of the chart during the year.

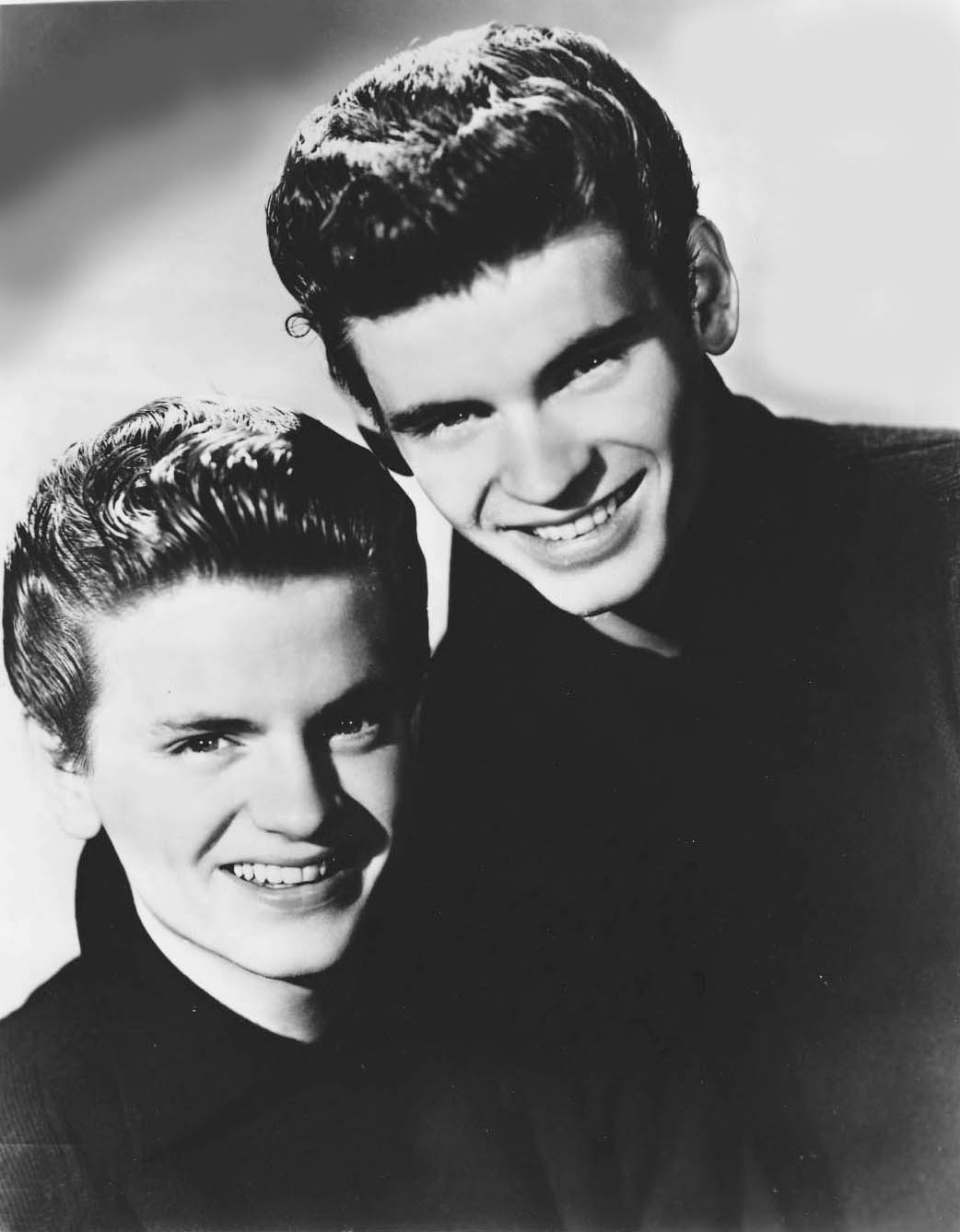
The Everly Brothers spent one week at number one with "Cathy's Clown".

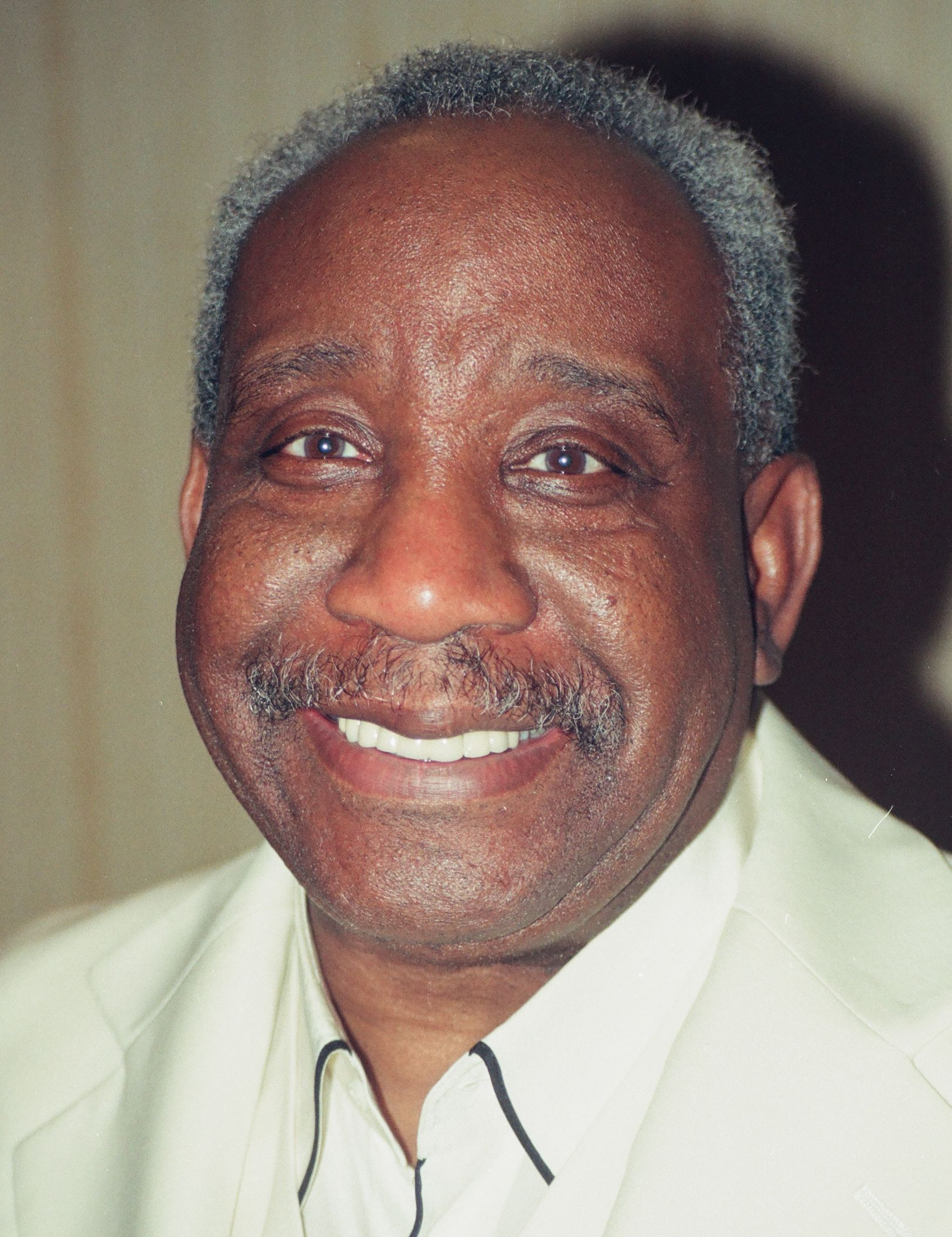
Jerry Butler (pictured in later life) ended the year at number one.

Chart history
Issue date	Title	Artist(s)	Ref.
January 4	"The Clouds"	The Spacemen	
January 11	"Smokie, Part 2"	Bill Black's Combo	
January 18	"Smokie, Part 2"	Bill Black's Combo	
January 25	"Smokie, Part 2"	Bill Black's Combo	
February 1	"Smokie, Part 2"	Bill Black's Combo	
February 8	"Baby (You've Got What It Takes)"	Dinah Washington and Brook Benton	
February 15	"Baby (You've Got What It Takes)"	Dinah Washington and Brook Benton	
February 22	"Baby (You've Got What It Takes)"	Dinah Washington and Brook Benton	
February 29	"Baby (You've Got What It Takes)"	Dinah Washington and Brook Benton	
March 7	"Baby (You've Got What It Takes)"	Dinah Washington and Brook Benton	
March 14	"Baby (You've Got What It Takes)"	Dinah Washington and Brook Benton	
March 21	"Baby (You've Got What It Takes)"	Dinah Washington and Brook Benton	
March 28	"Baby (You've Got What It Takes)"	Dinah Washington and Brook Benton	
April 4	"Baby (You've Got What It Takes)"	Dinah Washington and Brook Benton	
April 11	"Baby (You've Got What It Takes)"	Dinah Washington and Brook Benton	
April 18	"Fannie Mae"	Buster Brown	
April 25	"White Silver Sands"	Bill Black's Combo	
May 2	"White Silver Sands"	Bill Black's Combo	
May 9	"White Silver Sands"	Bill Black's Combo	
May 16	"White Silver Sands"	Bill Black's Combo	
May 23	"Doggin' Around"	Jackie Wilson	
May 30	"Doggin' Around"	Jackie Wilson	
June 6	"Doggin' Around"	Jackie Wilson	
June 13	"Cathy's Clown"	The Everly Brothers	
June 20	"A Rockin' Good Way (To Mess Around and Fall In Love)"	Dinah Washington and Brook Benton	
June 27	"A Rockin' Good Way (To Mess Around and Fall In Love)"	Dinah Washington and Brook Benton	
July 4	"A Rockin' Good Way (To Mess Around and Fall In Love)"	Dinah Washington and Brook Benton	
July 11	"There's Something On Your Mind (Part 2)"	Bobby Marchan	
July 18	"A Rockin' Good Way (To Mess Around and Fall In Love)"	Dinah Washington and Brook Benton	
July 25	"This Bitter Earth"	Dinah Washington	
August 1	"A Woman, a Lover, a Friend"	Jackie Wilson	
August 8	"A Woman, a Lover, a Friend"	Jackie Wilson	
August 15	"A Woman, a Lover, a Friend"	Jackie Wilson	
August 22	"A Woman, a Lover, a Friend"	Jackie Wilson	
August 29	"Kiddio" †	Brook Benton	
September 5	"Kiddio" †	Brook Benton	
September 12	"Kiddio" †	Brook Benton	
September 19	"Kiddio" †	Brook Benton	
September 26	"Kiddio" †	Brook Benton	
October 3	"Kiddio" †	Brook Benton	
October 10	"Kiddio" †	Brook Benton	
October 17	"Kiddio" †	Brook Benton	
October 24	"Kiddio" †	Brook Benton	
October 31	"Save the Last Dance For Me"	The Drifters	
November 7	"Let's Go, Let's Go, Let's Go"	Hank Ballard & The Midnighters	
November 14	"He Will Break Your Heart"	Jerry Butler	
November 21	"Let's Go, Let's Go, Let's Go"	Hank Ballard & The Midnighters	
November 28	"He Will Break Your Heart"	Jerry Butler	
December 5	"Let's Go, Let's Go, Let's Go"	Hank Ballard & The Midnighters	
December 12	"He Will Break Your Heart"	Jerry Butler	
December 19	"He Will Break Your Heart"	Jerry Butler	
December 26	"He Will Break Your Heart"	Jerry Butler	

== See also ==
- 1960 in music
- List of number-one R&B hits (United States)
