= Fred Jackson (saxophonist) =

American saxophonist (born 1929)

- Born: 1929 (age 96–97); Atlanta, Georgia, U.S.
- Genres: R&B, jazz, soul
- Occupation: Musician
- Instrument: Tenor saxophone
- Years active: 1950s–1960s
- Label: Blue Note

Fred Jackson (born 1929) is an American rhythm and blues and jazz tenor saxophonist.

== Career ==
Based in Atlanta, Georgia, Jackson began his career as an R&B saxophonist. He performed in Little Richard's band from 1951 until 1953. Jackson also accompanied vocalist Billy Wright, appearing on several recordings for Savoy Records. Later in the decade, he joined vocalist Lloyd Price's band, performing in concert tours during a peak in Price's popularity. Jackson also served as the bandleader for vocalist Chuck Willis. In 1961, Jackson recorded with B.B. King.

Jackson began making jazz recordings during the early 1960s, accompanying soul jazz organists such as John Patton and Baby Face Willette on several Blue Note albums. In 1962, he recorded one album, Hootin' 'n Tootin', under his own name for Blue Note. (The album's organist, Earl Van Dyke, later joined the Funk Brothers at Motown.) Jackson led a subsequent recording session for Blue Note, but these tracks were not released until 1998, when they were appended to the CD edition of Hootin' 'n Tootin'.

After the mid-1960s, Jackson continued playing R&B and soul music but largely disappeared from the jazz scene.

== Discography ==
=== As leader ===
- Hootin' 'n Tootin' (Blue Note, 1962)

=== As sideman/guest ===
With Baby Face Willette

- Face to Face (Blue Note, 1961)

With Big John Patton

- Along Came John (Blue Note, 1963)
- The Way I Feel (Blue Note, 1964)

With Lloyd Price

- The Exciting Lloyd Price (ABC-Paramount, 1959)
- This Is My Band (Double-L Records, 1963)

With Piano Red

- The Atlanta Blues
