= Blues for Lou =

Studio album by Grant Green
- Released: 1999
- Recorded: February 20 & June 7, 1963
- Studio: Van Gelder, Englewood Cliffs, New Jersey
- Genre: Jazz
- Length: 42:53
- Label: Blue Note; Blue Note 21438
- Producer: Alfred Lion

Grant Green chronology
Feelin' the Spirit (1962)	Blues for Lou (1999)	Am I Blue (1963)

Blues for Lou is an album by American jazz guitarist Grant Green featuring performances recorded in 1963, but not released on the Blue Note label until 1999. The album combines recordings from two different sessions that featured Green with organist Big John Patton and drummer Ben Dixon. The title track was named for saxophonist Lou Donaldson.

== Reception ==
Professional ratings
Review scores
Source	Rating
AllMusic	3/5 stars
The Penguin Guide to Jazz Recordings	3/4 stars

The AllMusic review by Ken Dryden stated, "While this session may not have met producer Alfred Lion's very high standards, it was worthy of release and definitely a worthwhile investment for fans of Grant Green".

== Track listing ==
No.	Title	Writer(s)	Length
1.	"The Surrey With the Fringe on Top"	Oscar Hammerstein II, Richard Rodgers	5:04
2.	"Blues for Lou"	Grant Green	4:40
3.	"Big John"	John Patton	7:24
4.	"Don't Let the Sun Catch You Crying"	Joe Greene	6:55
5.	"Look at That Girl"	Ben Dixon	4:18
6.	"This Little Girl of Mine"	Ray Charles	6:28
7.	"Personality"	Harold Logan, Lloyd Price	3:46
8.	"Have You Ever Had the Blues"	Harold Logan, Lloyd Price	4:28

Recorded on February 20 (tracks 1 & 3–8) & June 7 (track 2), 1963

== Personnel ==
- Grant Green - guitar
- Big John Patton - organ
- Ben Dixon - drums
