= Minor Swing =

Minor Swing may refer to:

- "Minor Swing" (composition) by Django Reinhardt & Stéphane Grappelli
- Minor Swing (album) by Big John Patton
