= The Exciting Lloyd Price =

Studio album by Lloyd Price
- Released: March 1959
- Recorded: Several dates in the 1950s, starting with "Lawdy Miss Clawdy" on March 13, 1952
- Length: 29:21
- Language: English
- Label: ABC-Paramount
- Producer: Don Costa

Lloyd Price chronology
The Exciting Lloyd Price (1959)	Mr. Personality (1959)

The Exciting Lloyd Price is the 1959 debut album by American singer Lloyd Price.

== Recording and release ==
Price had recorded several singles going back to 1952 with the hit "Lawdy Miss Clawdy", included on this album.

The success of single "Stagger Lee" led to Price being one of the biggest-selling music acts of 1959.

The editorial staff of AllMusic Guide gave the release three out of five stars and Billboard awarded it four out of five stars, citing several of the tracks as standout, including "Stagger Lee".

== Track listing ==
1. "Stagger Lee" (Archibald, Harold Logan, Lloyd Price) – 2:20
2. "I Wish Your Picture Was You" (Joe E. Brown, Price) – 2:04
3. "Talking About Love" (Logan, Price) – 2:06
4. "What Do You Do to My Heart?" (Logan, Price) – 2:37
5. "You Need Love" (Logan, Price) – 2:48
6. "Mailman Blues" (Price) – 2:10
7. "Where Were You (On Our Wedding Day)?" (Logan, John Patton, Price) – 2:37
8. "Why" (Price) – 2:00
9. "Lawdy Miss Clawdy" (Price) – 2:35
10. "Oh, Oh, Oh" (Price) – 2:05
11. "A Foggy Day" (George Gershwin, Ira Gershwin) – 2:54
12. "Just Because" (Price) – 2:42

== Personnel ==
- Lloyd Price – vocals

Additional musicians

- Ted Curson – trumpet
- Clarence Johnson – bass guitar
- Charles McClendon – tenor saxophone
- John Patton – piano
- Eddie Saunders – tenor saxophone
- Sticks Simpkins – drums

Musicians on "Lawdy Miss Clawdy"

- Dave Bartholomew – trumpet and band leader
- Fats Domino – piano
- Frank Fields – double bass
- Joseph Harris – tenor saxophone
- Ernest McLean – guitar
- Earl Palmer – drums

Technical personnel

- Don Costa – production
- Natt Hale – liner notes
- Matthew Schutz – design
- Allen Vogel – photography
