= Musart (album) =

Studio album by George Braith
- Released: July 1967
- Recorded: November 21, 1966 (#3, 7); January 3, 1967 (#1–2, 4–6)
- Studio: Van Gelder Studio, Englewood Cliffs, NJ
- Genre: Jazz
- Length: 41:36
- Label: Prestige; PRLP 7515
- Producer: Cal Lampley

George Braith chronology
Laughing Soul (1966)	Musart (1967)

Professional ratings
Review scores
Source	Rating
Allmusic	4.5/5 stars

Musart is an album by American saxophonist George Braith, his second and final effort for Prestige Records. It was recorded in 1966 and 1967, and released in mid 1967 as PRLP 7515.

== The pieces ==
In the original liner notes, Braith describes the album as "a concert in miniature. Each tune was selected to relay a message of love, peace and tranquility." "Our Blessings" was inspired by Braith's brother, while "Evelyn Anita" was named after his sister, Evelyn, and came to Braith's mind when he stopped to play "somewhere in the Southwest", on his way to Los Angeles. "Musart" and "Splashes of Love" were inspired by "beautiful sights as I crossed the United States." The latter "came to mind as I and Freddie Hubbard traveled from Los Angeles to a gig in San Francisco. We were hurrying to catch Trane's opening at the Workshop a day before ours at the Both-And. As Freddie took over the wheel of the car, I blew my soprano sax and a melody came to mind." "Del's Theme" is dedicated to disc jockey Del Shields.

== Track listing ==
All compositions by George Braith except where noted

1. "Del's Theme" - 7:54
2. "Laura" (Raksin, Mercer) - 5:33
3. "Our Blessings" - 3:57
4. "Splashes of Love" - 2:47
5. "Musart" - 9:09
6. "Embraceable You" (Gershwin, Gershwin) - 5:05
7. "Evelyn Anita" - 7:11

== Personnel ==
Tracks 3, 7

- George Braith - soprano sax, C-melody sax
- Jane Getz - piano
- Jay Carter - guitar
- Victor Davis - electric bass, organ
- Ben Dixon (#3), Cal Lampley (#7) - drums
- Victor Allende - congas
- Adrienne Barbeau, Bunny Foy, Ellen Shashoyan - vocals

Tracks 1–2, 4–6

- George Braith - soprano sax, alto sax, C-melody sax
- Jane Getz - piano
- Eddie Diehl - guitar
- Bill Salter - bass
- Angel Allende - drums, percussion
- Unknown percussionists and voices
