= Let 'em Roll =

Let 'em Roll may refer to:

- Let 'em Roll, a pricing game on The Price Is Right
- Let 'Em Roll (album), a 1966 album by American organist Big John Patton
