= Laughing Soul =

Studio album by George Braith
- Released: 1966
- Recorded: March 1, 1966
- Studio: Van Gelder Studio, Englewood Cliffs, NJ
- Genre: Jazz
- Length: 36:28
- Label: Prestige; PRLP 7474
- Producer: Cal Lampley

George Braith chronology
Extension (1964)	Laughing Soul (1966)	Musart (1967)

Laughing Soul is an album by American saxophonist George Braith, his first effort for Prestige after a two-year stint with Blue Note Records. The album was recorded in 1966 and issued the same year as PRLP 7474.

Professional ratings
Review scores
Source	Rating
Allmusic	2.5/5 stars

== Track listing ==
All compositions by George Braith except as indicated.

1. "Hot Sauce" - 3:45
2. "Chop Sticks" - 2:51
3. "Chunky Cheeks" (Dixon) - 4:39
4. "Crenshaw West" - 5:16
5. "Please Let Me Do It" - 3:06
6. "Coolodge" - 3:20
7. "With Malice Toward None" (McIntosh) - 5:20
8. "Little Flame" - 4:07
9. "Cantelope Woman" - 4:04

== Personnel ==
- George Braith - soprano and tenor saxophone
- "Big" John Patton - organ
- Grant Green - guitar
- Eddie Diehl - rhythm guitar
- Victor Sproles Jr. - bass
- Ben Dixon - drums
- Richard Landrum - congas
