= Soulstream =

Soulstream may refer to:

- Soulstream (Holly Johnson album), 1999
- Soul Stream, a 1963 album by George Braith
