= Understanding (John Patton album) =

Studio album by John Patton
- Released: 1968
- Recorded: October 25, 1968
- Studios: Van Gelder Studio, Englewood Cliffs, NJ
- Genre: Jazz
- Length: 38:48
- Label: Blue Note
- Producer: Francis Wolff

John Patton chronology
Boogaloo (1968)	Understanding (1968)	Accent on the Blues (1969)

Understanding is an album by American organist John Patton recorded in 1968 and released on the Blue Note label.

== Reception ==
Professional ratings
Review scores
Source	Rating
AllMusic	2/5 stars

The AllMusic review by Scott Yanow awarded the album 2 stars and stated "the endless repetitions on these rather simplistic originals may drive alert listeners batty after a while."

== Track listing ==
All compositions by John Patton except where noted

1. "Ding Dong" (Harold Alexander) - 5:38
2. "Congo Chant" - 9:05
3. "Alfie's Theme" (Sonny Rollins) - 4:40
4. "Soul Man" (Isaac Hayes, David Porter) - 6:13
5. "Understanding" (Sam Gary, Mark Nash) - 6:52
6. "Chitlins con Carne" (Kenny Burrell) - 6:30

- Recorded at Rudy Van Gelder Studio, Englewood Cliffs, New Jersey on October 25, 1968.

== Personnel ==
- Big John Patton - organ
- Harold Alexander - tenor saxophone, flute
- Hugh Walker - drums
