= I Want to Hold Your Hand (disambiguation) =

"I Want to Hold Your Hand" is a song by the Beatles.

I Want to Hold Your Hand may also refer to:

- I Wanna Hold Your Hand (film), a 1978 film
- I Want to Hold Your Hand (album), an album by Grant Green
