= Ed Cherry =

American jazz guitarist (born 1954)

- Born: Edward E. Cherry Jr. October 12, 1954; New Haven, Connecticut, U.S.
- Genres: Jazz
- Occupations: Musician; songwriter
- Instrument: Guitar
- Years active: 1978–present
- Labels: Groovin' High; Justin Time; Posi-Tone
- Website: www.edcherryguitar.com

Edward E. Cherry Jr. (born October 12, 1954) is an American jazz guitarist and studio musician. Cherry is perhaps best known for his long association with trumpeter Dizzy Gillespie, with whom he performed from 1978 until shortly before Gillespie's death in 1993. Since that time, he has worked with Paquito D'Rivera, Jon Faddis, John Patton, Hamiet Bluiett, Henry Threadgill, and Paula West. He has recorded a number of albums as a leader.

== Discography ==
=== As leader ===
- First Take (Groovin' High, 1993)
- Second Look (Groovin' High, 1994)
- The Spirits Speak (Justin Time, 2001)
- Create with Marco Marzola (Wide Music, 2005)
- It's All Good (Posi-Tone, 2012)
- Soul Tree (Posi-Tone, 2016)
- Peace (Space Time, 2022)
- Are We There Yet? (Cellar Music Group, 2022)

=== As sideman ===
With Hamiet Bluiett

- With Eyes Wide Open (Justin Time, 2000)

With Brian Charette

- Jackpot (Cellar Live, 2022)

With Paquito D'Rivera

- Havana Cafe (Chesky, 1991)

With Jon Faddis

- Hornucopia (Epic, 1991)

With Ken Fowser

- Right On Time (Posi-Tone, 2019)

With Dizzy Gillespie

- Musician, Composer, Raconteur with Milt Jackson (Pablo, 1981)
- Live at the Royal Festival Hall (Enja, 1989)
- Live! at Blues Alley (Blues Alley, 1992)

With Roy Hargrove's Crisol

- Grande-Terre (Verve, 2024)

With Jared Gold

- Supersonic (Posi-Tone, 2009)
- Golden Child (Posi-Tone, 2012)

With New York Funkies

- Hip Hop Bop! with Stanley Turrentine, Reuben Wilson (Meldac, 1995)

With Ben Paterson

- Live at Van Gelder's (Cellar Live, 2018)

With John Patton

- Blue Planet Man (Evidence, 1997) with John Zorn
- Minor Swing (DIW, 1995) with John Zorn
- This One's for Ja (DIW, 1998)

With Dr. Lonnie Smith

- In The Beginning: Volumes 1 & 2 (Pilgrimage, 2013)

With Henry Threadgill

- Song Out of My Trees (Black Saint, 1994)
- Makin' a Move (Columbia, 1995)

With Jason Tiemann

- T-Man (T-Man, 2020)

With Doug Webb

- Bright Side (Posi-Tone, 2016)

With Charles Williams

- When Alto Was King (Mapleshade, 1997)
