= Iron City (album) =

Iron City!

Studio album by Grant Green
- Released: 1972
- Recorded: 1967
- Genre: Jazz
- Length: 39:31
- Label: Cobblestone; CST 9002

Grant Green chronology
His Majesty King Funk (1965)	Iron City! (1972)	Carryin' On (1969)

Iron City! is an album by American jazz guitarist Grant Green featuring performances said to be recorded in 1967 and first released on the Cobblestone label in 1972.

== Reception ==
Professional ratings
Review scores
Source	Rating
Allmusic	3/5 stars
DownBeat	4/5 stars
The Penguin Guide to Jazz Recordings	3/4 stars
The Rolling Stone Jazz Record Guide	4/5 stars

The Allmusic review by Stephen Thomas Erlewine awarded the album 3 stars calling it "a fine, overlooked date that showcases some of Green's hottest, bluesiest playing".

== Track listing ==
All compositions by Grant Green except as indicated

1. "Iron City" - 5:04
2. "Samba de Orpheus" (Luiz Bonfá, Antônio Maria, André Michel Salvet) - 7:08
3. "Old Man Moses (Let My People Go)" (Traditional) - 6:59
4. "High Heeled Sneakers" (Robert Higginbotham) - 6:04
5. "Motherless Child" (Traditional) - 8:03
6. "Work Song" (Nat Adderley) - 6:11

- Recorded in Pittsburgh, PA in 1967

== Personnel ==
- Grant Green - guitar
- "Big" John Patton - Hammond B3 organ
- Ben Dixon - drums
