= Blue Planet Man =

Studio album by Big John Patton
- Released: 1993
- Recorded: April 12 & 13 1993
- Genre: Hard Bop
- Length: 53:04
- Label: Evidence
- Producer: Thelma Patton

John Patton chronology
Soul Connection (1983)	Blue Planet Man (1993)	Minor Swing (1994)

Blue Planet Man is a 1993 album by organist Big John Patton which features John Zorn and was originally released on King Records/Paddle Wheel Records in Japan in 1993 and subsequently released in the USA on Evidence Records in 1997. The album was considered part of Patton's 1990s "comeback".

== Reception ==
The Allmusic review by Alex Henderson awarded the album 3 stars noting that "Not one of Patton's essential releases, Blue Planet Man is definitely enjoyable and well-intended -- the album reminds us that Patton can hardly be considered one-dimensional".

Professional ratings
Review scores
Source	Rating
Allmusic	3/5 stars

== Track listing ==
All compositions by "Big" John Patton except as indicated.

1. "Congo Chant" - 8:47
2. "Funky Mama" - 6:49
3. "Claudette" - 7:56
4. "Chip" - 5:43
5. "Popeye" - 8:01
6. "What's Your Name" - 4:25
7. "U-Jama" (Shepp) - 6:53
8. "Bama" - 4:28
- Recorded at Skyline Studios, New York, April 12 & 13, 1993

== Personnel ==
- Big John Patton – organ
- John Zorn – alto saxophone
- Pete Chavez – tenor saxophone
- Bill Saxton – tenor and soprano saxophones
- Ed Cherry – guitar
- Eddie Gladden – drums
- Lawrence Killian – congas
- Rorie Nichols – vocal
