= Extension (George Braith album) =

Studio album by George Braith
- Released: 1967
- Recorded: March 27, 1964
- Studio: Van Gelder Studio, Englewood Cliffs, NJ
- Genre: Jazz
- Length: 37:29
- Label: Blue Note; BST 84171
- Producer: Alfred Lion

George Braith chronology
Soulstream (1963)	Extension (1967)	Laughing Soul (1966)

Extension is the third album by American saxophonist George Braith recorded in 1964 and released on the Blue Note label.

== Reception ==
The Allmusic review by Stephen Thomas Erlewine awarded the album 4½ stars and stated "George Braith turned in his strongest record with Extension. Largely freed from the restraints of the dueling horns, Braith is able to explore the outer reaches of his music. He still remains grounded in soul-jazz -- any guitar-organ combo is bound to have soul-jazz roots -- but he pushes the music toward adventurous hard bop, often with rewarding results".

Professional ratings
Review scores
Source	Rating
Allmusic	4.5/5 stars

== Track listing ==
All compositions by George Braith, except where noted.

1. "Nut City" - 5:57
2. "Ethlyn's Love" - 7:22
3. "Out Here" - 6:58
4. "Extension" - 6:39
5. "Sweetville" - 6:03
6. "Ev'ry Time We Say Goodbye" (Porter) - 4:30

== Personnel ==
- George Braith - soprano saxophone, tenor saxophone, alto saxophone
- Billy Gardner - organ
- Grant Green - guitar
- Clarence Johnston - drums
