= Oh Baby! (Big John Patton album) =

Studio album by Big John Patton
- Released: 1965
- Recorded: March 8, 1965
- Studio: Van Gelder Studio, Englewood Cliffs, NJ
- Genre: Jazz
- Length: 40:34
- Label: Blue Note; BST 84192
- Producer: Alfred Lion

Big John Patton chronology
The Way I Feel (1964)	Oh Baby! (1965)	Let 'em Roll (1965)

Oh Baby! is an album by American organist Big John Patton recorded in 1965 and released on the Blue Note label.

== Reception ==
Professional ratings
Review scores
Source	Rating
AllMusic	4/5 stars

The AllMusic review by Michael Erlewine awarded the album 4 stars and stated "Although a little on the light side, thanks to Patton and Green, the groove does go down".

== Track listing ==
All compositions by John Patton except where noted

1. "Fat Judy" (Ben Dixon) – 7:40
2. "Oh Baby" – 6:17
3. "Each Time" – 5:39
4. "One to Twelve" – 7:52
5. "Night Flight" (Harold Vick) – 6:35
6. "Good Juice" – 6:31

== Personnel ==
- Big John Patton – organ
- Blue Mitchell – trumpet
- Harold Vick – tenor saxophone
- Grant Green – guitar
- Ben Dixon – drums
