= Accent on the Blues =

Studio album by John Patton
- Released: 1969
- Recorded: August 15, 1969
- Studio: Rudy Van Gelder Studio, Englewood Cliffs, New Jersey
- Genre: Jazz
- Length: 66:24
- Label: Blue Note
- Producer: Francis Wolff

John Patton chronology
Boogaloo (1968)	Accent on the Blues (1969)	Memphis to New York Spirit (1996)

Accent on the Blues is an album by American organist John Patton recorded in 1969 and released on the Blue Note label.

== Reception ==
Professional ratings
Review scores
Source	Rating
Allmusic	3/5 stars
The Penguin Guide to Jazz Recordings	3.5/4 stars

The Allmusic review by Stephen Thomas Erlewine awarded the album 3 stars and stated "Accent on the Blues is among the most atmospheric music Patton has ever made. While it stops short of being free, it's hardly funky soul-jazz, and that may disappoint some fans of his rip-roaring style. Nevertheless, the album is a rewarding listen, primarily because it displays a more reflective side of his talent".

== Track listing ==
All compositions by John Patton except as indicated

1. "Rakin' and Scrapin'" (Harold Mabern) – 10:05
2. "Freedom Jazz Dance" (Eddie Harris) – 4:44
3. "Captain Nasty" (Marvin Cabell) – 5:06
4. "Village Lee" (Cabell) – 7:21
5. "Lite Hit" (Cabell) – 6:21
6. "Don't Let Me Lose This Dream" (Aretha Franklin, Ted White) – 6:56
7. "Lite Hit" [alternate take] (Cabell) – 6:07 Bonus track on CD reissue
8. "Buddy Boy" – 6:36 Bonus track on CD reissue
9. "2 J" – 7:46 Bonus track on CD reissue
10. "Sweet Pea" – 5:22 Bonus track on CD reissue
  - Recorded at Rudy Van Gelder Studio, Englewood Cliffs, New Jersey on August 15 (tracks 1–7) and June 9 (tracks 8–10), 1969.

== Personnel ==
- Big John Patton – organ
- Marvin Cabell – tenor saxophone, flute
- George Coleman – tenor saxophone (tracks 8–10)
- James Blood Ulmer – guitar (tracks 1–7)
- Leroy Williams – drums
