= The Way I Feel (John Patton album) =

Studio album by "Big" John Patton
- Released: 1964
- Recorded: June 19, 1964
- Studio: Van Gelder Studio, Englewood Cliffs, NJ
- Genre: Jazz
- Length: 36:28
- Label: Blue Note; BST 84174
- Producer: Alfred Lion

"Big" John Patton chronology
Blue John (1963)	The Way I Feel (1964)	Oh Baby! (1965)

The Way I Feel is an album by American organist John Patton recorded in 1964 and released on the Blue Note label.

== Reception ==
Professional ratings
Review scores
Source	Rating
AllMusic	3/5 stars

The AllMusic review by Stephen Thomas Erlewine awarded the album 3 stars and stated "There are several fine moments on the record, and Green and Patton are typically enjoyable, but the record overall is a slight disappointment after its two predecessors".

== Track listing ==
All compositions by John Patton

1. "The Rock" – 7:29
2. "The Way I Feel" – 8:38
3. "Jerry" – 6:45
4. "Davene" – 7:25
5. "Just ¾" – 6:51

== Personnel ==
- "Big" John Patton – organ
- Richard Williams – trumpet (1–3, 5)
- Fred Jackson – tenor saxophone, baritone saxophone (1–3, 5)
- Grant Green – guitar
- Ben Dixon – drums
