= Ben Dixon (musician) =

American jazz drummer (1934–2018)

- Born: December 25, 1934; Gaffney, South Carolina, U.S.
- Died: November 8, 2018 (aged 83)
- Genre: Jazz
- Instrument: Drums

Ben Dixon (December 25, 1934 – November 8, 2018) was an American jazz drummer.

Dixon is best known for his contributions to many soul jazz albums on the Blue Note label led by Grant Green, Lou Donaldson and Big John Patton. He died on November 8, 2018, at the age of 83.

== Discography ==
=== As leader ===
- Say Yes to Your Best (American Classical Jazz, 2000), with Adam Scone, Coleman Mellett

=== As sideman ===
With George Braith

- Laughing Soul (Prestige, 1966)

With Lou Donaldson

- The Natural Soul (Blue Note, 1962)
- A Man with a Horn (Blue Note, 1963)
- Good Gracious! (Blue Note, 1963)
- Signifyin' (Argo, 1963)
- Possum Head (Argo, 1964)
- Musty Rusty (Cadet, 1965)

With Ray Draper

- Tuba Sounds (Prestige, 1957)

With Grant Green

- Grant's First Stand (Blue Note, 1961)
- Sunday Mornin' (Blue Note, 1961)
- Blues for Lou (Blue Note, 1963)
- Am I Blue (Blue Note, 1963)
- His Majesty King Funk (Verve, 1965)
- Iron City (Cobblestone, 1967)

With Johnny Hodges

- Wings & Things (Verve, 1965), with Wild Bill Davis

With Richard "Groove" Holmes

- Soul Power! (Prestige, 1967)

With Joe Jones

- Introducing the Psychedelic Soul Jazz Guitar of Joe Jones (Prestige, 1967)

With Jack McDuff

- The Honeydripper (Prestige, 1961)

With Big John Patton

- Along Came John (Blue Note, 1963)
- Blue John (Blue Note, 1963)
- The Way I Feel (Blue Note, 1964)
- Oh Baby! (Blue Note, 1965)

With Stanley Turrentine

- A Chip Off the Old Block (Blue Note, 1963)

With Harold Vick

- Steppin' Out! (Blue Note, 1963)

With Don Wilkerson

- Shoutin' (Blue Note, 1963)

With Baby Face Willette

- Face to Face (Blue Note, 1961)
- Stop and Listen (Blue Note, 1961)
