= His Majesty King Funk =

Studio album by Grant Green
- Released: August/September 1965
- Recorded: May 26, 1965
- Studio: Van Gelder Studio, Englewood Cliffs, NJ
- Genre: Jazz
- Length: 33:17
- Label: Verve; V6-8627
- Producer: Creed Taylor

Grant Green chronology
I Want to Hold Your Hand (1965)	His Majesty King Funk (1965)	Iron City (1967)

His Majesty King Funk is a jazz album recorded in 1965 by Grant Green. It features Green with tenor saxophonist Harold Vick, organist Larry Young, drummer Ben Dixon and percussionist Candido.

== Reception ==
Professional ratings
Review scores
Source	Rating
Allmusic	3/5 stars
The Penguin Guide to Jazz Recordings	3/4 stars
Record Mirror	4/5 stars
Down Beat	2/5 stars

The Allmusic review by Michael Erlewine awarded the album 3 stars and stated “This is soul-jazz with a deep groove. His Majesty King Funk is the last of five albums Green recorded with Young. Produced by Creed Taylor, it is the only album Green did for Verve and perhaps his last real jazz album before several years of inactivity, after which he became somewhat more commercial in his approach”.

John Heidt wrote about this album at Vintage Guitar magazine: “Green’s His Majesty King Funk is well-named. With five cuts of soul-drenched jazz, it’s easy to see why he’s the darling of the acid-jazz movement. He had an earthiness to his playing not found in lots of other jazz guitarists, and this set, with Larry Young on organ lets that shine through”.

== Track listing ==
1. "The Selma March" (Grant Green) - 8:26
2. "Willow Weep for Me" (Ann Ronell) - 10:01
3. "The Cantaloupe Woman" (Ben Dixon) - 4:55
4. "That Lucky Old Sun" (Haven Gillespie, Beasley Smith) - 5:20
5. "Daddy Grapes" (Robert Graham) - 4:35

== Personnel ==
- Grant Green - guitar
- Harold Vick - tenor saxophone, flute
- Larry Young - Hammond B-3 organ
- Ben Dixon - drums
- Candido Camero - bongos, congas
