= Am I Blue (album) =

Studio album by Grant Green
- Released: Late June 1964
- Recorded: May 16, 1963
- Studio: Van Gelder Studio, Englewood Cliffs, NJ
- Genre: Soul jazz
- Length: 40:46
- Label: Blue Note; BST 84139
- Producer: Alfred Lion

Grant Green chronology
Blues for Lou (1963)	Am I Blue (1964)	Idle Moments (1963)

Am I Blue is an album by American jazz guitarist Grant Green featuring performances recorded in 1963 and released on the Blue Note label. The first two tracks had both been recorded by Ray Charles. “Sweet Slumber” was a 1940s hit for swing band leader Lucky Millinder. Green is heard in a quintet with tenor saxophonist Joe Henderson, trumpeter Johnny Coles, organist Big John Patton and drummer Ben Dixon.

== Reception ==
The Allmusic review by Scott Yanow awarded the album 3½ stars and stated "Although certainly listenable enough, this is one of Grant Green's lesser efforts from the 1960s".

Professional ratings
Review scores
Source	Rating
Allmusic	3.5/5 stars
The Penguin Guide to Jazz Recordings	2.5/4 stars

== Track listing ==
1. "Am I Blue" (Harry Akst, Grant Clarke) - 6:56
2. "Take These Chains from My Heart" (Hy Heath, Fred Rose) - 6:12
3. "I Wanna Be Loved" (Johnny Green, Edward Heyman, Billy Rose) - 7:39
4. "Sweet Slumber" (Lucky Millinder, Al J. Neiburg, Henri Woode) - 7:17
5. "For All We Know" (J. Fred Coots, Sam M. Lewis) - 13:59

== Personnel ==
- Grant Green - guitar
- Johnny Coles - trumpet
- Joe Henderson - tenor saxophone
- "Big" John Patton - organ
- Ben Dixon - drums
