= That Certain Feeling (album) =

Studio album by John Patton
- Released: 1968
- Recorded: March 8, 1968
- Studio: Van Gelder Studio, Englewood Cliffs, NJ
- Genre: Jazz
- Length: 41:09
- Label: Blue Note
- Producer: Francis Wolff

John Patton chronology
Got a Good Thing Goin' (1966)	That Certain Feeling (1968)	Boogaloo (1968)

That Certain Feeling is an album by American organist John Patton recorded in 1968 and released on the Blue Note label.

== Reception ==
Professional ratings
Review scores
Source	Rating
AllMusic	3.5/5 stars

The AllMusic review by Stephen Thomas Erlewine awarded the album 3½ stars and stated "there are moments when everything comes together and it just cooks. And those are the moments that make That Certain Feeling worth a search".

== Track listing ==
All compositions by John Patton except where noted

1. "String Bean" - 5:42
2. "I Want to Go Home" - 8:36
3. "Early A.M." - 7:17
4. "Dirty Fingers" - 6:09
5. "Minor Swing" - 6:38
6. "Daddy James" (Jimmy Watson) - 6:47

- Recorded at Rudy Van Gelder Studio, Englewood Cliffs, New Jersey on March 8, 1968.

== Personnel ==
- Big John Patton - organ
- Junior Cook - tenor saxophone
- Jimmy Ponder - guitar
- Clifford Jarvis - drums
