= Along Came John =

Studio album by John Patton
- Released: 1963
- Recorded: April 5, 1963
- Studio: Van Gelder Studio, Englewood Cliffs, NJ
- Genre: Jazz
- Length: 34:34
- Label: Blue Note; BST 84130
- Producer: Alfred Lion

John Patton chronology
| Along Came John (1963) | Blue John (1963) |

Along Came John is the debut album by American organist John Patton, recorded in 1963 and released on the Blue Note label.

== Reception ==
Professional ratings
Review scores
| Source | Rating |
|---|---|
| AllMusic | 4/5 stars |
| The Penguin Guide to Jazz Recordings | 3.5/4 stars |

The AllMusic review by Stephen Thomas Erlewine awarded the album 4 stars and stated "These original compositions may not all be memorable, but the band's interaction, improvisation, and solos are. Tenor saxophonists Fred Jackson and Harold Vick provide good support, as well, but the show belongs to Patton, Green, and Dixon, who once again prove they are one of the finest soul-jazz combos of their era".

== Track listing ==
All compositions by John Patton except where noted

1. "The Silver Meter" (Ben Dixon) – 5:41
2. "I'll Never Be Free" (Bennie Benjamin, George Weiss) – 5:03
3. "Spiffy Diffy" (Dixon) – 6:02
4. "Along Came John" – 6:03
5. "Gee Gee" – 6:01
6. "Pig Foots" (Dixon) – 5:44

== Personnel ==
- John Patton – organ
- Fred Jackson, Harold Vick – tenor saxophone
- Grant Green – guitar
- Ben Dixon – drums
