= Got a Good Thing Goin' =

Studio album by Big John Patton
- Released: 1966
- Recorded: April 29, 1966
- Studio: Van Gelder Studio, Englewood Cliffs, NJ
- Genre: Jazz
- Length: 36:43
- Label: Blue Note; BST 84229
- Producer: Alfred Lion

Big John Patton chronology
Let 'em Roll (1965)	Got a Good Thing Goin' (1966)	That Certain Feeling (1966)

Got a Good Thing Goin' is an album by American organist Big John Patton recorded in 1966 and released on the Blue Note label.

== Reception ==
Professional ratings
Review scores
Source	Rating
AllMusic	4.5/5 stars
The Penguin Guide to Jazz Recordings	3/4 stars

The AllMusic review by Stephen Thomas Erlewine awarded the album 4½ stars and stated "Fans of hard bop may find the songs a little too simple, but hot, up-tempo soul-jazz rarely comes any better than it does on Got a Good Thing Goin'."

== Track listing ==
All compositions by John Patton and Grant Green except where noted

1. "The Yodel" – 8:19
2. "Soul Woman" – 7:44
3. "Ain't That Peculiar" (Warren "Pete" Moore, Smokey Robinson, Marv Tarplin, Ronald White) – 6:48
4. "The Shake" (Sam Cooke) – 7:48
5. "Amanda" (Duke Pearson) – 6:08

== Personnel ==
Grant Green played in the guitar chair for all of Patton's prior LPs. This would be the final Patton album on which Green was the guitarist.

- Big John Patton – organ
- Grant Green – guitar
- Hugh Walker – drums
- Richie "Pablo" Landrum – congas
