= This One's for Ja =

Studio album by John Patton Quintet
- Released: 1996
- Recorded: December 26, 1995
- Genre: Jazz
- Length: 54:09
- Label: DIW
- Producer: John Zorn and Kazunori Sugiyama

John Patton chronology
Minor Swing (1995)	This One's for Ja (1996)	Eagle Eye Blues (2001)

This One's for Ja is an album by American organist John Patton recorded on December 26, 1995, and released on the Japanese DIW label in 1996.

== Reception ==
Professional ratings
Review scores
Source	Rating
AllMusic	3.5/5 stars

The AllMusic review by Stephen Thomas Erlewine awarded the album 3½ stars and stated "Patton has made one of the rare comebacks in jazz, one that does justice to his earlier work".

== Track listing ==
All compositions by John Patton except as indicated

1. "Patand" - 7:35
2. "Cherry Red" - 7:23
3. "Steam" (Archie Shepp) - 7:50
4. "No Problem" - 6:32
5. "Syeeda's Song Flute" (John Coltrane) - 5:17
6. "Extensions" - 7:56
7. "Sonny's Back" (Grachan Moncur III) - 4:15
8. "Children of the Night" (Wayne Shorter) - 7:21

- Recorded at Power Station, New York City on December 26, 1996.

== Personnel ==
- John Patton - organ
- Dave Hubbard - tenor saxophone
- Ed Cherry - guitar
- Eddie Gladden - drums
- Lawrence Killian - percussion
