= Memphis to New York Spirit =

Studio album by John Patton
- Released: 1996
- Recorded: June 9, 1969 & October 2, 1970
- Studio: Van Gelder Studio, Englewood Cliffs, NJ
- Genre: Jazz
- Length: 57:19
- Label: Blue Note
- Producer: Michael Cuscuna, Tom Evered

John Patton chronology
Accent on the Blues (1969)	Memphis to New York Spirit (1996)	Soul Connection (1983)

Memphis to New York Spirit is an album by American organist John Patton recorded in 1969 and 1970 but not released on the Blue Note label until 1996.

== Reception ==
Professional ratings
Review scores
Source	Rating
Allmusic	3.5/5 stars

The Allmusic review by Stephen Thomas Erlewine awarded the album 3½ stars and stated "Memphis to New York Spirit doesn't have a consistent groove like some other Patton records, but when it does click, the results are remarkable; it's worthy addition to a funky soul-jazz collection".

== Track listing ==
All compositions by John Patton except where noted

1. "Memphis" - 5:55
2. "Footprints" (Wayne Shorter) - 6:24
3. "The Mandingo" (Marvin Cabell) - 7:50
4. "Bloodyun" (James Blood Ulmer) - 8:20
5. "Steno" - 9:10
6. "Man from Tanganyika" (McCoy Tyner) - 6:10
7. "Cissy Strut" (Art Neville, Ziggy Modeliste, Leo Nocentelli, George Porter Jr.) - 6:55
8. "Dragon Slayer" (Cabell) - 6:35

- Recorded at Rudy Van Gelder Studio, Englewood Cliffs, New Jersey on June 9, 1969 (tracks 6–8) and October 2, 1970 (tracks 1–5).

== Personnel ==
- Big John Patton - organ
- Marvin Cabell - tenor saxophone, soprano saxophone, flute
- George Coleman - tenor saxophone (tracks 6–8)
- James Blood Ulmer - guitar (tracks 1–5)
- Leroy Williams - drums
