= Earl Van Dyke =

American keyboardist (1930–1992)

Background information
- Born: July 8, 1930; Detroit, Michigan, U.S.
- Died: September 18, 1992 (aged 62) Detroit, Michigan, U.S.
- Genres: R&B; soul
- Occupation: Musician
- Instrument: Keyboards
- Formerly of: The Funk Brothers

Earl Van Dyke (July 8, 1930 – September 18, 1992) was an American soul musician, most notable as the main keyboardist for Motown Records' in-house Funk Brothers band during the late 1960s and early 1970s.

== Career ==
Van Dyke, who was born in Detroit, Michigan, United States, was preceded as keyboardist and bandleader of the Funk Brothers by Joe Hunter. In the early 1960s, he also recorded as a jazz organist with saxophonists Fred Jackson and Ike Quebec for the Blue Note label.

Besides his work as the session keyboardist on Motown hits such as "Bernadette" by the Four Tops, "I Heard It Through the Grapevine" by Marvin Gaye, "Where Did Our Love Go" by the Supremes, "Ain't Too Proud to Beg" and "Runaway Child, Running Wild" by the Temptations, "My Guy" by Mary Wells and "For Once in My Life" by Stevie Wonder, Van Dyke performed with a small band as an opening act for several Motown artists, and released instrumental singles and albums himself. Several of Van Dyke's recordings feature him playing keys over the original instrumental tracks for Motown hits; others are complete covers of Motown songs.

His 1967 hit "6 by 6" is popular on the Northern soul music scene. He was nicknamed "Big Funk", and "Chunk o Funk".

Van Dyke played the Steinway grand piano, the Hammond B-3 organ, the Wurlitzer electric piano, the Fender Rhodes, and the celeste and harpsichord. He played a toy piano for the introduction of the Temptations' hit, "It's Growing". His musical influences included Tommy Flanagan, Hank Jones, and Barry Harris.

Van Dyke died of prostate cancer in Detroit, Michigan, at the age of 62.

== Discography ==
=== Singles ===
Soul (Motown) releases

- 1964: "Soul Stomp"
- 1965: "All For You"*
- 1965: "I Can't Help Myself (Sugar Pie, Honey Bunch)"*
- 1965: "The Flick (Part II)"*
- 1967: "6 By 6"**
- 1969: "Run Away Child, Running Wild"

(*) billed as "Earl Van Dyke & the Soul Brothers" (the billed name of the Funk Brothers band was changed by Motown head Berry Gordy, as he disliked the connotation of the word "funk")

(**) billed as "Earl Van Dyke & the Motown Brass"

=== Albums ===
Soul (Motown) releases

- 1965: That Motown Sound (Earl Van Dyke & the Soul Brothers)
- 1970: The Earl of Funk (Earl Van Dyke Live)

=== As sideman ===
With Fred Jackson

- Hootin' 'n Tootin' (Blue Note, 1962)

With Ike Quebec

- The Complete Blue Note 45 Sessions (Blue Note, 1962)

And on Motown recordings by The Undisputed Truth, The Temptations, The Supremes, David Ruffin, Jr. Walker and the All Stars, Yvonne Fair, Leslie Uggams, Bonnie Pointer.

== Filmography ==
- Justman, Paul (2002). Standing in the Shadows of Motown (Motion picture). New York: Artisan Entertainment.
