= Two Souls in One =

1963 studio album by saxophonist George Braith

Studio album by George Braith
- Released: 1963
- Recorded: September 4, 1963
- Studio: Van Gelder Studio, Englewood Cliffs, NJ
- Genre: Jazz
- Length: 41:11
- Label: Blue Note; BST 84148
- Producer: Alfred Lion

George Braith chronology
Two Souls in One (1963)	Soul Stream (1963)

Two Souls in One is the debut album by American saxophonist George Braith recorded in 1963 and released on the Blue Note label.

== Reception ==
The Allmusic review by Stephen Thomas Erlewine awarded the album 3 stars and stated "In some ways, it's hard to view George Braith's playing a soprano and alto saxophone simultaneously as anything other than a gimmick, especially since it's nearly presented that way on his debut album... Nevertheless, Two Souls in One remains an enjoyable, occasionally rewarding, collection of soul-jazz and cautiously adventurous hard bop".

Professional ratings
Review scores
Source	Rating
Allmusic	3/5 stars

== Track listing ==
1. "Mary Ann" (Traditional) - 7:31
2. "Home Street" (George Braith) - 6:57
3. "Poinciana" (Nat Simon, Buddy Bernier) - 6:17
4. "Mary Had a Little Lamb" (Sarah Josepha Hale, John Roulstone) - 6:57
5. "Braith-A-Way" (Braith) - 13:29

== Personnel ==
- George Braith - soprano saxophone, stritch
- Billy Gardner - organ
- Grant Green - guitar
- Donald Bailey - drums
