= Feelin' the Spirit =

Studio album by Grant Green
- Released: Early October 1963
- Recorded: December 21, 1962
- Studios: Van Gelder Studio, Englewood Cliffs, NJ
- Genre: Jazz
- Length: 46:26
- Labels: Blue Note; BST 84132
- Producer: Alfred Lion

Grant Green chronology
Goin' West (1962)	Feelin' the Spirit (1963)	Blues for Lou (1963)

Professional ratings
Review scores
Source	Rating
Allmusic	link
Encyclopedia of Popular Music	5/5 stars
The Penguin Guide to Jazz Recordings	3.5/4 stars

Feelin' the Spirit is an album by jazz guitarist Grant Green originally issued on Blue Note Records as BLP 4132 and BST 84132. Consisting of jazz arrangements of traditional African American spirituals, it is one of a series of themed records recorded by the guitarist in 1962. Green is supported by pianist Herbie Hancock, bassist Butch Warren and drummer Billy Higgins.

From the original liner notes: "Green has made no attempt here to recreate the five spirituals he plays in anything resembling their original context, nor has he tried to duplicate their often pallid manifestation on the concert stage. He has approached them with affection, but as music to be played in his style. The result is a fascinating combination: the techniques of modern jazz, blues, and gospel, all applied to the spiritual." - Joe Goldberg

This album was remastered and reissued in Blue Note's Rudy Van Gelder Edition series on March 1, 2005.

== Track listing ==
1. "Just a Closer Walk with Thee" - 7:25
2. "Joshua Fit the Battle of Jericho" - 8:00
3. "Nobody Knows the Trouble I've Seen" - 6:05
4. "Go Down Moses" - 7:25
5. "Sometimes I Feel Like a Motherless Child" - 9:00
6. "Deep River" (Harry Burleigh) - 8:53
- Track 6 only available on CD.

== Personnel ==
- Grant Green - electric guitar
- Herbie Hancock - piano
- Butch Warren - bass
- Billy Higgins - drums
- Garvin Masseaux - tambourine
