= Question (Lloyd Price song) =

Single by Lloyd Price
- B-side: "If I Look A Little Blue"
- Released: The week of June 27, 1960
- Genre: Funk; Soul; RnB
- Length: 2:29
- Label: ABC-Paramount
- Songwriters: Harold Logan; Lloyd Price

Lloyd Price singles chronology
""For Love"" (1960)	"Question" (1960)	""Just Call Me (And I'll Understand)"" (1960)

"Question" is a 1960 hit song written by Lloyd Price and Harold Logan. Lloyd Price's recording was issued as ABC-Paramount single 10123, reaching the Top 10 of the Billboard R&B Singles chart, peaking at #5, and the Top 20 on the Billboard Hot 100, peaking at #19. The song combines a rhythm and blues musical arrangement with a pop style backing vocal-chorus. Lloyd performed the song on a 1960 telecast of Dick Clark's "Beech Nut" Saturday night show on ABC Television. It was the last Top 20 Pop hit of Lloyd's career, although he came close three years later, (in 1963), with his live hit cover of the Erroll Garner standard "Misty", which reached # 21.

== Covers ==
According to Allmusic, the song has been covered by several artists, including Emile Ford, Percy Milem, P. J. Proby, and Howard Tate.
