= Blue John (album) =

Studio album by John Patton
- Released: 1986
- Recorded: July 11 & August 2, 1963
- Studio: Van Gelder Studio, Englewood Cliffs, NJ
- Genre: Jazz
- Length: 40:21
- Label: Blue Note BST 84143
- Producer: Alfred Lion

John Patton chronology
Along Came John (1963)	Blue John (1986)	The Way I Feel (1964)

Blue John is an album by American organist John Patton recorded in 1963 but not released on the Blue Note label until 1986.

== Reception ==
The AllMusic review by Steve Huey awarded the album 4½ stars and stated "While the grooving interplay between Patton, Green, and Dixon is as instinctive as ever, Braith's piercing, honking stabs are what really liven up the proceedings, giving Blue John a crazed sense of fun that makes it one of Patton's most infectious and enjoyable records".

Professional ratings
Review scores
Source	Rating
AllMusic	4.5/5 stars

== Track listing ==
All compositions by John Patton except as indicated

1. "Hot Sauce" (George Braith) – 7:55
2. "Bermuda Clay House" (Braith) – 5:55
3. "Dem Dirty Blues" (Grant Green) – 6:15
4. "Country Girl" – 6:51
5. "Nicety" (Ben Dixon) – 5:30
6. "Blue John" – 7:55
- Recorded at Rudy Van Gelder Studio, Englewood Cliffs, New Jersey on July 11 (tracks 5 & 6) and August 6 (tracks 1–4), 1963.

== Personnel ==
- John Patton – organ
- Tommy Turrentine – trumpet (5, 6)
- George Braith – soprano saxophone, stritch
- Grant Green – guitar
- Ben Dixon – drums
