= Hootin' 'n Tootin' =

Studio album by Fred Jackson
- Released: 1962
- Recorded: February 5, 1962 (#1–7); April 9, 1962 (#8–14)
- Studio: Van Gelder Studio, Englewood Cliffs, NJ
- Genre: Jazz
- Length: 37:52
- Label: Blue Note; BST 84094
- Producer: Alfred Lion

Hootin' 'n Tootin' is the debut album by American saxophonist Fred Jackson, and the sole recording under his leadership, recorded in 1962 and released on the Blue Note label. The CD reissue added seven previously unissued bonus tracks from a later session.

== Reception ==
The Allmusic review by Stephen Thomas Erlewine awarded the album 4½ stars and stated "Hootin' 'n Tootin' is a thoroughly enjoyable set of funky soul-jazz with hard bop overtones. It is true that Jackson doesn't try anything new on the set, but he proves to be a capable leader... the result is a modest but highly entertaining set of earthy, bluesy soul-jazz that should have been heard by a wider audience".

Professional ratings
Review scores
Source	Rating
Allmusic	4.5/5 stars

== Track listing ==
All compositions by Fred Jackson

1. "Dippin' in the Bag" – 4:01
2. "Southern Exposure" – 6:56
3. "Preach Brother" – 5:46
4. "Hootin' 'n Tootin'" – 4:33
5. "Easin' on Down" – 6:17
6. "That's Where It's At" – 5:08
7. "Way Down Home" – 5:11

Bonus tracks on CD reissue:

8. "Stretchin' Out" – 5:00
9. "Mr. B.J." – 6:39
10. "Egypt Land" – 4:24
11. "Teena" – 5:19
12. "On the Spot" – 4:55
13. "Minor Exposure" – 4:58
14. "Little Freddie" – 4:43

== Personnel ==
- Fred Jackson – tenor saxophone
- Earl Van Dyke – organ
- Willie Jones – guitar
- Sam Jones – bass (tracks 8–14)
- Wilbert Hogan – drums
- unknown – congas and shaker (tracks 12–14)
