= Let 'Em Roll (album) =

Let 'em Roll

Studio album by Big John Patton
- Released: Mid 1966
- Recorded: December 11, 1965
- Studio: Van Gelder Studio, Englewood Cliffs, NJ
- Genre: Jazz
- Length: 39:58
- Label: Blue Note; BST 84239
- Producer: Alfred Lion

"Big" John Patton chronology
| Oh Baby! (1965) | Let 'em Roll (1966) | Got a Good Thing Goin' (1966) |

Let 'em Roll is an album by American organist Big John Patton recorded in 1965 and released on the Blue Note label.

== Reception ==
Professional ratings
Review scores
| Source | Rating |
|---|---|
| AllMusic | 5/5 stars |
| The Penguin Guide to Jazz Recordings | 3/4 stars |

The AllMusic review by Thom Jurek awarded the album 5 stars and stated "This is one of the least appreciated of Patton's records, and there's no reason for it; it is great".

== Track listing ==
All compositions by John Patton except where noted

1. "Let 'em Roll" – 6:48
2. "Latona" – 7:23
3. "The Shadow of Your Smile" (Johnny Mandel, Paul Francis Webster) – 6:55
4. "The Turnaround" (Hank Mobley) – 6:49
5. "Jakey" – 5:37
6. "One Step Ahead" – 6:26

== Personnel ==
- Big John Patton – organ
- Bobby Hutcherson – vibes
- Grant Green – guitar
- Otis Finch – drums
