= Soul Stream =

Studio album by George Braith
- Released: 1964
- Recorded: December 16, 1963
- Studio: Van Gelder Studio, Englewood Cliffs, NJ
- Genre: Jazz
- Length: 36:08
- Label: Blue Note; BST 84161
- Producer: Alfred Lion

George Braith chronology
Two Souls in One (1963)	Soul Stream (1964)	Extension (1964)

Soul Stream is the second album by American saxophonist George Braith recorded in 1963 and released on the Blue Note label.

== Reception ==
The Allmusic review by Stephen Thomas Erlewine awarded the album 4 stars and stated "Soul Stream finds George Braith coming into his own. Where his debut felt hampered by uneven material and unsure execution of Braith's trademark double-sax attack, Soul Stream is confident and assured... Unfortunately, Braith never truly cuts loose, but there's enough provocative material and cerebral grooves on Soul Stream to make it a worthwhile listen".

Professional ratings
Review scores
Source	Rating
Allmusic	4/5 stars

== Track listing ==
All compositions by George Braith except where noted

1. "The Man I Love" (Gershwin, Gershwin) - 5:26
2. "Outside Around the Corner" - 7:52
3. "Soul Stream" - 3:14
4. "Boop Bop Bing Bash" (Billy Gardner) - 6:23
5. "Billy Told" (Traditional) - 7:52
6. "Jo Anne" - 5:21

== Personnel ==
- George Braith - tenor saxophone, soprano saxophone, stritch
- Billy Gardner - organ
- Grant Green - guitar
- Hugh Walker - drums
