= George Braith =

American jazz musician

George Braith (born George Braithwaite on June 26, 1939) is a soul-jazz saxophonist from New York.

== Career ==
Braith is known for playing multiple horns at once, a technique pioneered by Roland Kirk. He is credited with the invention of the Braithophone, a welded-together alto and soprano saxophone.

Braith is featured in a mosaic in the 72nd street station of the Second Avenue Subway in the New York City Subway system.

== Discography ==
George Braith has played on:

=== As leader ===
- Two Souls in One (Blue Note, 1963)
- Soul Stream (Blue Note, 1963 [1964])
- Extension (Blue Note, 1964 [1967])
- Laughing Soul (Prestige, 1966)
- Musart (Prestige, 1967)
- Double Your Pleasure (Bellaphon, 1992)
- Rafting Brace (Victor [jp], 1998) reissue of Laughing Soul
- The Complete Blue Note Sessions (Blue Note/EMI, 2001) 2-CD
- George Braith & Friends, Volume 1 (Excellence, 2002)
- Turn of the Century (Excellence, 2003)
- Barcelona Blues (Excellence, 2006)
- Boptronics (Excellence, 2006)
- Bip Bop Bam (Excellence, 2006)
- Bop Rock Blues (Excellence, 2007)
- New York Soul (Excellence, 2021)

=== As sideman ===
With John Patton

- Blue John (Blue Note, 1963)
- Eagle Eye Blues (Excellence, 2001 [2006])
