= Boogaloo (John Patton album) =

Studio album by John Patton
- Released: April 4, 1995
- Recorded: August 9, 1968
- Studio: Van Gelder Studio, Englewood Cliffs, NJ
- Genre: Soul jazz, jazz-funk
- Length: 41:39
- Label: Blue Note; Blue Note 31878
- Producer: Francis Wolff

John Patton chronology
That Certain Feeling (1968)	Boogaloo (1995)	Understanding (1968)

Boogaloo is an album by American organist John Patton recorded in 1968 but not released on the Blue Note label until 1995.

== Reception ==
Professional ratings
Review scores
Source	Rating
Allmusic	2.5/5 stars

The Allmusic review by Scott Yanow awarded the album 2½ stars and stated "this is a routine and now-dated set of commercial late-'60s jazz-funk".

== Track listing ==
All compositions by John Patton except where noted

1. "Boogaloo Boogie" - 5:25
2. "Milk and Honey" - 8:20
3. "Barefootin'" (Robert Parker) - 7:07
4. "Shoutin' But No Poutin'" - 7:43
5. "Spirit" - 5:52
6. "B&J (Two Sisters)" - 7:12

== Personnel ==
- Big John Patton - organ
- Vincent McEwan - trumpet
- Harold Alexander - tenor saxophone, flute
- George Edward Brown - drums
- Richard Landrum - conga
