= I'm Gonna Get Married =

Single by Lloyd Price

from the album Mr. "Personality"
- B-side: "Three Little Pigs"
- Released: July 1959
- Recorded: 1959
- Genre: R&B; pop
- Length: 2:18
- Label: ABC-Paramount
- Songwriters: Harold Logan and Lloyd Price

Lloyd Price singles chronology
"Gonna Let You Come Back Home" (1959)	"I'm Gonna Get Married" (1959)	"Three Little Pigs" (1959)

"I'm Gonna Get Married" is a 1959 R&B/pop hit written by Harold Logan and Lloyd Price and recorded by Lloyd Price. Price's last known performance of "I'm Gonna Get Married" was on July 8, 1994.

== Background ==
The lyrics address Price as "Johnny" throughout the song. it's a lyrical battle between the chorus, who keep telling Johnny that he's too young to get married, despite how smart he is, and Johnny, who plans to marry the girl he loves, admitting that he's not smart enough to aid his aching heart. Johnny goes on to tell what happens when he's with his girl, which he cannot help it at all.

== Charts ==
The single was his follow-up to "Personality" and, like that entry, "I'm Gonna Get Married" went to number one on the Billboard R&B chart, where it stayed for three consecutive weeks. The single was the last of his four number ones, as well as his fifth Top 40 single, peaking at number three for two weeks on the Billboard Hot 100 pop singles chart.

== Chart history ==
Chart (1959)	Peak position
U.K. Singles Chart	23
U.S. Billboard Hot 100	3
U.S. Billboard Hot R&B Sides	1
