= The Clouds (composition) =

Song by The Spacemen
- B-side: "The Lonely Jet Pilot"
- Released: July 1959
- Recorded: 1959
- Genre: R&B
- Length: 2:30
- Label: Alton Records

"The Clouds" is a 1959 instrumental by The Spacemen, an instrumental studio group. The single released on the Alton label, was the only chart hit by The Spacemen. "The Clouds" hit number one on the R&B chart for three non consecutive weeks, and also peaked at number forty-one on the Hot 100.
