= John Patton (musician) =

American jazz/blues/R&B keyboardist

- Also known as: "Big John" Patton
- Born: July 12, 1935; Kansas City, Missouri, U.S.
- Died: March 19, 2002 (aged 66) Montclair, New Jersey, U.S.
- Genres: Jazz; blues; R&B; gospel; hard bop; soul jazz
- Occupations: Musician, composer
- Instruments: Organ, piano, keyboards
- Years active: 1954–2002
- Labels: Blue Note, DIW

John Patton (July 12, 1935 – March 19, 2002) was an American hard bop and soul-jazz organist and pianist often known by his nickname, "Big John" Patton. Patton's musical style blended elements of jazz, blues, R&B, funk, and gospel.

Patton was one of the most in-demand organists during the golden era of the Hammond B-3 organs between 1963 and 1970. He recorded extensively for Blue Note and performed or collaborated with Lloyd Price, Grant Green, and Lou Donaldson. Patton had a lower profile in the 1970s but enjoyed a comeback in the 1980s and 1990s, often in collaboration with saxophonist John Zorn. His later music incorporated modal and free jazz.

== Biography ==
John Patton was born in Kansas City, Missouri, United States. He developed the nickname "Big John", not because of his size, but because of the country song "Big Bad John". "Remember the tune, 'Big Bad John'? ... yeah, well, that's what they started calling me and at first I didn't understand it but I love it now. It's just a name; if it's going to help you, then boogie on up in there!"

Patton's mother was a church pianist who taught him how to play fundamentals. When he was about 13 years old, in 1948, he began to teach himself. He was inspired by the music he heard in his hometown, but he wanted to play beyond the Kansas City jazz scene. After high school, he headed East and found professional work. In 1954 in Washington, D.C., he found out that R&B star Lloyd Price was playing at the Howard Theater, and that Price had just fired his pianist and needed a new player. Patton played a few bars from the introduction to "Lawdy, Miss Clawdy". He was given the job.

It was a relationship that would last until 1959. "I learned everything with Lloyd," Patton said. "I was his 'straw boss' and the leader and he dumped all this on me and that was an experience that I got a chance to deal with." He recruited top players for Lloyd, including drummer Ben Dixon. Dixon, another self-taught player, encouraged John to check out the Hammond B-3 organ when they played in clubs that had one. "Some of the clubs that we would play in would have an organ off to the side and every time I would have a chance to get with that organ, man, it was just fascinating to me...especially the bass line."

A man called "Butts" first showed Patton how to set up the organ and find the right registrations. When he moved to New York in late 1959, and began playing gigs around town, Herman Green, a friend who played with Lionel Hampton's band, took him to a Hammond in Asbury Park, New Jersey, and helped him learn how to play it. Patton was fascinated with the differences in the nuance of the sound that an electric organ could produce. "Man, listen, it's so sensitive and it will reveal its secrets if you try to get up in there and learn it...and learn the sound and contact. You can't play it like a piano 'cause that's another thing all together - The notes are the same but, see, that electricity puts another 'jammie' on you, you know what I mean? You must deal with touch and so many other things...and I was very frustrated at first."

Patton set up his own Hammond organ trio in 1959. Blue Note artist Ike Quebec became his mentor, introducing him into Blue Note and to one of the most important relationships in his career, with guitarist Grant Green. "Grant is my love...I never heard nobody play the guitar like that brother...Grant started playing when he was about twelve and he was out there a long time...and I was so thrilled that I got a chance to play with him, man, but he was greedy, (like a) Gemini, (but) I was a mule...I didn't care; I sho' learned!"

He worked as a sideman for Lou Donaldson for three and a half years, until 1964. "He says 'Play the BLUES'," Patton recalled. "You don't mess with Lou 'cause Lou knows how to play the Be Bop and Blues and Rhythm and Blues ... I am very fortunate that I got a chance to spend that much time with him and I can't thank him enough." Of his influences, Patton stated "I love trumpet, I love trombone, I love reeds...I love it all...Musicians like Fred Jackson, Richard Williams, Grant Green, Ben Dixon and Johnny Griffin...I can go on and on ...This is where I got my concept."

The acid jazz movement in the 1980s caused a resurgence in interest in Patton's music in the UK. Blue Note released many sessions that had not previously been released, including Blue John with Grant Green and George Braith (listed as Braithwaite on the LP). Patton made several trips to England where he was embraced by the acid jazz community.

Patton died from complications arising from diabetes, in Montclair, New Jersey, on March 19, 2002.

== Discography ==
=== As leader ===
- Along Came John (Blue Note, 1963)
- Blue John (Blue Note, 1963)
- The Way I Feel (Blue Note, 1964)
- Oh Baby! (Blue Note, 1965)
- Let 'Em Roll (Blue Note, 1965)
- Got a Good Thing Goin' (Blue Note, 1966)
- That Certain Feeling (Blue Note, 1968)
- Understanding (Blue Note, 1968)
- Accent on the Blues (Blue Note, 1969)
- Soul Connection (Nilva, 1983; Just A Memory/Justin Time, 2008)
- Blue Planet Man (Paddle Wheel, 1993; Evidence, 1997)
- Minor Swing (DIW, 1994)
- Boogaloo (Blue Note, 1995) – rec. 1968
- Memphis to New York Spirit (Blue Note, 1996) – rec. 1969-70
- This One's for Ja (DIW, 1998) – rec. 1996
- Eagle Eye Blues (Excellence, 2006) – live rec. 2001

=== As sideman ===
With Lou Donaldson

- The Natural Soul (Blue Note, 1962)
- Good Gracious! (Blue Note, 1963)
- Signifyin' (Argo, 1963)
- Possum Head (Argo, 1964)
- Ha' Mercy (Cadet, 1971)
- A Man with a Horn (Blue Note, 1999)

With Grant Green

- Am I Blue (Blue Note, 1964)
- Iron City (Cobblestone, rec., 1967, rel. 1972)
- Blues for Lou (Blue Note, rec. 1963, rel. 1999)

With Jimmy Ponder

- Mean Streets – No Bridges (Muse, 1987)
- Jump (Muse, 1989)

With John Zorn

- The Big Gundown (Elektra Nonesuch, 1986)
- Spillane (Elektra Nonesuch, 1987)

With others

- George Braith, Laughing Soul (Prestige, 1966)
- Ed Cherry, Second Look (Groovin' High, 1994)
- Johnny Griffin & Matthew Gee, Soul Groove (Atlantic, 1963)
- Red Holloway, The Burner (Prestige, 1964)
- Clifford Jordan, Soul Fountain (Vortex, 1970)
- Johnny Lytle, Everything Must Change (Muse, 1978)
- Grassella Oliphant, The Grass Is Greener (Atlantic, 1967)
- Lloyd Price, The Exciting Lloyd Price (ABC-Paramount, 1959)
- Harold Vick, Steppin' Out! (Blue Note, 1963)
- Don Wilkerson, Shoutin' (Blue Note, 1963)
