= Stagger Lee =

American folk song

"Stack O' Lee Blues"

Single by Waring's Pennsylvanians
- B-side: "Stavin' Change"
- Released: 1923
- Recorded: Camden, New Jersey, April 18, 1923
- Length: 3:21
- Label: Victor
- Songwriter: Ray Lopez (credited on single)

"Stagger Lee" (Roud 4183), also known as "Stagolee" and other variants, is a popular American folk song about the murder of Billy Lyons by "Stag" Lee Shelton, in St. Louis, Missouri, on Christmas 1895. The song was first published in 1911 and first recorded in 1923, by Fred Waring's Pennsylvanians, titled "Stack O' Lee Blues". A version by Lloyd Price reached number one on the Billboard Hot 100 in 1959.

== Background ==
The historical Stagger Lee was Lee Shelton, an African-American pimp living in St. Louis, Missouri, in the late 19th century. He was nicknamed Stag Lee or Stack Lee, with a variety of explanations being given: he was given the nickname because he "went stag" (attended social events unaccompanied by a person of the opposite sex); he took the nickname from a well-known riverboat captain called Stack Lee; or, according to John and Alan Lomax, he took the name from a riverboat owned by the Lee family of Memphis called the Stack Lee, which was known for its on-board prostitution. Shelton was well known locally as one of the Macks, a group of pimps who attracted attention through their flashy clothing and appearance. In addition to those activities, he was the captain of a black Four Hundred Club, a social club with a dubious reputation.

On Christmas night in 1895, Shelton and his acquaintance William "Billy" Lyons were drinking in the Bill Curtis Saloon. Lyons was also a member of St. Louis' underworld, and may have been a political and business rival to Shelton. Eventually, the two men got into a dispute, during which Lyons took Shelton's Stetson hat. Subsequently, Shelton shot Lyons, recovered his hat, and left. Lyons died of his injuries, and Shelton was charged, tried, and convicted of the murder in 1897. He was paroled in 1909, but returned to prison in 1911 for assault and robbery. He died incarcerated in 1912.

The crime quickly entered into American folklore and became the subject of song, as well as folktales and toasts. The song's title comes from Shelton's nickname—Stag Lee or Stack Lee. The name was quickly corrupted in the folk tradition. Early versions were called "Stack-a-Lee" and "Stacker Lee", while "Stagolee" and "Stagger Lee" also became common. Other recorded variants include "Stackerlee", "Stack O'Lee", "Stackolee", "Stackalee", "Stagerlee", and "Stagalee".

== Early versions ==
A song called "Stack-a-Lee" was first mentioned in 1897, in the Kansas City Leavenworth Herald, as being performed by "Prof. Charlie Lee, the piano thumper". The earliest versions were likely field hollers and other work songs performed by African-American laborers, and were well known along the lower Mississippi River by 1910. That year, musicologist John Lomax received a partial transcription of the song, and in 1911, two versions were published in the Journal of American Folklore by the sociologist and historian Howard W. Odum.

The song was first recorded by Waring's Pennsylvanians in 1923 and became a hit. Another version was recorded later that year by Frank Westphal & His Regal Novelty Orchestra, and Herb Wiedoeft and his band recorded the song in 1924. Also in 1924, the first version with lyrics was recorded, as "Skeeg-a-Lee Blues", by Lovie Austin. Ma Rainey recorded "Stag O'Lee Blues", a different song based on the melody and words of "Frankie and Johnnie", the following year, with Louis Armstrong on cornet, and a version was recorded by Frank Hutchison on January 28, 1927, in New York, and is included in Harry Smith's famous Anthology of American Folk Music (Song 19 of 84).

Before World War II, the song was commonly known as "Stack O'Lee". W.C. Handy wrote that it probably was a nickname for a tall person, comparing him to the tall smokestack of the famous steamboat Robert E. Lee. By the time W.C. Handy wrote that explanation in 1926, "Stack O' Lee" was already familiar in United States popular culture, with recordings of the song made by pop singers of the day, such as Cliff Edwards.

The version by Mississippi John Hurt, recorded in 1928, is regarded by many as definitive. In his version, as in all such pieces, there are many (sometimes anachronistic) variants on the lyrics. Several older versions give Billy's last name as "De Lyons" or "Delisle". Other notable pre-war versions were recorded by Duke Ellington (1927), Cab Calloway (1931), Woody Guthrie (1941), and Sidney Bechet (1945).

== Lloyd Price version ==
"Stagger Lee"

Single by Lloyd Price
- B-side: "You Need Love"
- Released: November 1958
- Recorded: New York City, September 11, 1958
- Genre: New Orleans R&B; rock and roll
- Length: 2:20
- Label: ABC-Paramount
- Songwriters: Lloyd Price, Harold Logan (credited on single)
- Producer: Don Costa

Lloyd Price singles chronology
"No Limit to Love" (1958)	"Stagger Lee" (1958)	"Where Were You (On Our Wedding Day)?" (1959)

Lloyd Price recorded an R&B rendition of the song as "Stagger Lee" in 1958, and it rose to the top of both the R&B and US pop charts in early 1959. Although his version uses similar lyrics to previous versions of the song, his rendition features a different melody and has no lyrical refrain, making it shorter than previous recordings of the song. Price's version of the song was ranked number 456 on Rolling Stone's 500 Greatest Songs of All Time list, and also reached number 7 on the UK singles chart. Price also recorded a lyrically toned-down version of the song that changed the shooting to an argument between two friends for his appearance on Dick Clark's American Bandstand.

== Chart performance ==
=== Lloyd Price version ===
Chart (1959)	Peak position
UK Singles (The Official Charts Company)	7
US Billboard Hot 100	1
US Hot R&B Sides (Billboard)	1

== Other post-war versions ==
- In 1950, a version of "Stack-a-Lee" by New Orleans pianist Archibald reached number 10 on the Billboard R&B chart.
- Pat Boone
- Fats Domino
- Ike and Tina Turner
- The Righteous Brothers
- The Isley Brothers
- Champion Jack Dupree released a version in 1958 named "Stack-O-Lee" on the album titled Blues From The Gutter.
- James Brown
- Wilson Pickett (whose version made number 22 on the US pop chart)
- Johnny and the Hurricanes (whose instrumental is called "High Voltage")
- Dave Van Ronk on his 1962 album Dave Van Ronk, Folksinger
- Tom Rush on his 1963 album, Blues, Songs And Ballads
- Doc Watson on his 1967 album Ballads From Deep Gap
- Elvis Presley 1970, unreleased but recently discovered recording from the outtakes of Elvis: That's The Way It Is
- Taj Mahal on the 1969 album Giant Step/De Ole Folks at Home.
- Tommy Roe's 1971 version of the song went to number 25 on the Billboard Hot 100 and number 17 on the Canadian Singles Chart.
- Pacific, Gas & Electric included the song under the name "Staggolee" on their 1970 album Are You Ready?;
- The Youngbloods released a version of the song on their 1971 album, Good and Dusty.
- In 1972 Dr. John included a version on his album Dr. John's Gumbo.
- The Grateful Dead frequently played and eventually recorded a version of the tale which focuses on the fictionalized hours after the death of "Billy DeLyon", when Billy's wife Delia tracks down Stagger Lee in a local saloon and "she shot him in the balls" in revenge for Billy's death.
- Christian Rock musician Larry Norman wrote new lyrics using a bluesy version of the song "Nightmare #97" about a religious experience where the narrator is caught up to heaven. It was recorded in 1977 but not published until 1981 on the album Something New Under the Son.
- The Clash used some lyrics for their intro to their cover of the Jamaican rocksteady group the Rulers song "Wrong 'em Boyo" from the 1979 album London Calling.
- A version by the Fabulous Thunderbirds can be found on the Porky's Revenge soundtrack (1985).
- Bob Dylan included a version of "Stack A Lee" on his 1993 album World Gone Wrong.
- An extended version appears on Southside Johnny and the Asbury Jukes 1981 live album Reach Up And Touch The Sky.
- Huey Lewis and the News recorded "Stagger Lee" on their 1994 album of R&B covers, Four Chords And Several Years Ago.
- Neil Sedaka recorded the song in 1983 for his album Come See About Me.
- In 1996, Nick Cave and the Bad Seeds included a song called "Stagger Lee" on their album Murder Ballads. Not a cover version of the classic song, but instead an alternative and darker version of the tale itself, the references are evident: set in 1932, a still alive Stagger Lee now owns a Colt .45 (instead of the 'original' .44) and carries a deck of cards; he also still has his Stetson hat, which is now, of course, "old". Also Stagger Lee still has problems in bars, and ends up shooting not only a bartender, but also another rival also called Billy. This version retakes a street "toast poem" on Stagolee.
- The Black Keys recorded a song entitled "Stack Shot Billy" on their 2004 album Rubber Factory.
- In 2005, Chris Whitley and Jeff Lang recorded their own arrangement of the song, called "Stagger Lee", ultimately released on their 2006 CD Dislocation Blues.
- In the 2007 film Black Snake Moan, Samuel L. Jackson's character sings a boastful version of the song from Stagger Lee's perspective, titled "Stackolee". This version is based on R. L. Burnside's rendition which can be heard on the album Well, Well, Well.
- Modern Life Is War recorded a hardcore punk version for their 2007 album Midnight in America.
- Josh Ritter recorded a version of the tale titled "Folk Bloodbath" on the album So Runs the World Away. In his version, Stagger Lee kills Louis Collins, the subject of a murder ballad by Mississippi John Hurt, and 'Hangin' Billy Lyons is the judge who sentences Stagger to die.
- Neil Diamond released a version in 1979 on the album titled September Morn.
- Justin Townes Earle released a version titled "Same Old Stagolee" on his 2017 album Kids In The Street.
- In 2011 Snakefarm included song called "Staggerlee" in their album My Halo In Half-light.

== Popular culture ==
- The song is sung by an African-American prisoner in Jack Black's autobiography You Can't Win.
- In 1949 an episode of the radio anthology series program Destination Freedom, written by Richard Durham, retold the "Tales of Stackalee".
- The song "Wrong 'Em Boyo" by the Jamaican rocksteady group the Rulers begins with a quotation from "Stagger Lee": "Stagger Lee met Billy and they got down to gambling / Stagger Lee throwed seven, Billy said that he throwed eight." The song was notably covered by the Clash on their 1979 album London Calling with an additional lyric to finish the verse: "So Billy said, 'Hey Stagger! I'm gonna make my big attack / I'm gonna have to leave my knife in your back.'"
- Stagger Lee was the masked persona of wrestler Junkyard Dog, who donned the name and mask in Mid-South Wrestling due to an angle where he was forced to leave his wrestling territory for 90 days. Another wrestler, Koko B. Ware, would used the same formula in Memphis.
- Professional wrestling announcer Lee Marshall used Stagger Lee as a nickname during his time in World Championship Wrestling.
- The version by Pacific Gas & Electric, was included on the soundtrack for Quentin Tarantino's film Death Proof, the second portion of the 2007 double-feature Grindhouse.
- Blues musician Keb' Mo' performs his version in a scene from the 2007 film Honeydripper.
- In Percival Everett's 2001 novel Erasure and its 2023 film adaptation American Fiction, black literature professor Thelonious "Monk" Ellison becomes frustrated with the success of books that exploit and sensationalize Black American poverty, violence, and crime, and writes a satire of these books, first titled My Pafology and then retitled Fuck, under the pseudonym "Stagg R. Leigh", and must then deal with the effects of his book being taken seriously by everyone and becoming wildly successful.
- The cosmic horror novella My Heart Struck Sorrow by John Hornor Jacobs centers on an ethnomusicologist travelling the Southern United States in search of various versions of "Stagger Lee" in the belief that there is an ur-version of the song with supernatural qualities.

== See also ==
- List of Billboard Hot 100 number-one singles of 1959
- List of number-one R&B singles of 1959 (U.S.)
