= Minor Swing (album) =

Studio album by John Patton
- Released: May 30, 1995
- Recorded: December 21, 1994
- Studio: Power Station, New York City
- Genre: Hard Bop
- Length: 53:35
- Label: DIW; DIW 846
- Producer: Kazunori Sugiyama & John Zorn

John Patton chronology
Blue Planet Man (1993)	Minor Swing (1995)	This One's for Ja (1996)

Minor Swing is an album by organist John Patton which features John Zorn and was originally released on the DIW label in Japan in 1995. The album was considered part of Patton's 1990 "comeback".

== Reception ==
The Allmusic review by Al Campbell awarded the album 3½ stars noting that "Luckily, on Minor Swing, organist Big John Patton and John Zorn encourage taking chances and opening the music up, while not going so far out as to overwhelm the intended fundamental groove... highly recommended".

Professional ratings
Review scores
Source	Rating
Allmusic	3.5/5 stars

== Track listing ==
All compositions by John Patton except as indicated.

1. "The Way I Feel" - 12:05
2. "Tyrone" - 6:32
3. "Minor Swing" - 8:36
4. "The Rock" - 6:27
5. "Along Came John" - 5:14
6. "Lite Hit" (Marvin Cabell, John Patton) - 7:14
7. "B Men Thel" - 7:27

== Personnel ==
- John Patton – organ
- John Zorn – alto saxophone
- Ed Cherry – guitar
- Kenny Wollesen – drums
