= Smokie, Part 2 =

Song

"Smokie, Part 2" is a 1959 instrumental by Bill Black's Combo. The single was the first of four entries on the R&B chart and was successful, where it made to number one for four weeks, in early 1960. "Smokie, Part 2" also hit the top 20 on the pop singles chart.

== Chart positions ==
Chart (1960)	Peak position
U.S. Billboard Hot 100	17
U.S. Billboard Hot R&B Singles	1
