= I Want to Hold Your Hand (album) =

Studio album by Grant Green
- Released: Late May 1966
- Recorded: March 31, 1965
- Studio: Van Gelder Studio, Englewood Cliffs, NJ
- Genre: Jazz
- Length: 41:30
- Label: Blue Note
- Producer: Alfred Lion

Grant Green chronology
Street of Dreams (1964)	I Want to Hold Your Hand (1966)	His Majesty King Funk (1965)

I Want to Hold Your Hand is an album by American jazz guitarist Grant Green featuring performances recorded in 1965 and released on the Blue Note label. Featuring jazz arrangements of pop songs (including the title track by The Beatles), Green is supported by organist Larry Young and drummer Elvin Jones from his previous sessions, along with tenor saxophonist Hank Mobley.

== Reception ==
Professional ratings
Review scores
Source	Rating
AllMusic	4.5/5 stars
DownBeat	4/5 stars
Encyclopedia of Popular Music	3/5 stars
The Penguin Guide to Jazz Recordings	3.5/4 stars

The AllMusic review by Steve Huey states, "Even with all the straightforward pop overtones of much of the material, the quartet's playing is still very subtly advanced, both in its rhythmic interaction and the soloists' harmonic choices. Whether augmented by an extra voice or sticking to the basic trio format, the Green/Young/Jones team produced some of the most sophisticated organ/guitar combo music ever waxed, and I Want to Hold Your Hand is the loveliest of the bunch".

== Track listing ==
1. "I Want to Hold Your Hand" (John Lennon, Paul McCartney) – 7:23
2. "Speak Low" (Kurt Weill, Ogden Nash) – 7:14
3. "Stella by Starlight" (Victor Young, Ned Washington) – 6:29
4. "Corcovado (Quiet Nights)" (Antônio Carlos Jobim) – 5:59
5. "This Could Be the Start of Something" (Steve Allen) – 7:08
6. "At Long Last Love" (Cole Porter) – 7:17

== Personnel ==
- Grant Green - guitar
- Hank Mobley - tenor saxophone (tracks 1–4 & 6)
- Larry Young - organ
- Elvin Jones - drums
