= Personality (Lloyd Price song) =

Original song written and composed by Harold Logan, Lloyd Price

Single by Lloyd Price
- B-side: "Have You Ever Had the Blues"
- Released: April 1959
- Genre: Rhythm & blues
- Length: 2:35
- Label: ABC-Paramount
- Songwriters: Harold Logan, Lloyd Price

Lloyd Price singles chronology
"Where Were You (On Our Wedding Day?)" (1959)	"Personality" (1959)	"I'm Gonna Get Married" (1959)

"Personality" is a 1959 song with music and lyrics by Harold Logan and Lloyd Price. It was released as a single by Price, and became one of Lloyd Price's most popular crossover hits. The single reached number 2 for three weeks on the Billboard Hot 100, kept from the number 1 spot by "The Battle of New Orleans" by Johnny Horton. The song was also a number 1 U.S. R&B hit, maintaining the top spot for four weeks. Billboard ranked it as the number 3 song for 1959, with the number 1 slot going to "The Battle of New Orleans". The song reached number 9 in the UK Singles Chart.

== Cover versions ==
- A version by Anthony Newley reached number 6 in the United Kingdom in June 1959.
- In 1959, Argentinian singer Billy Caffaro, edited the Spanish version "Personalidad".
- As "Personalità", performed by Caterina Valente, it was a major Italian hit in 1960.
- In 1967, Mitch Ryder got to number 87 with a live medley of this song and "Chantilly Lace".
- In 1974, Jackie Robinson, lead singer of The Pioneers, released a reggae version in the UK on Trojan Records' subsidiary label Horse.
- Jerry Lee Lewis released a country and western version on his 1979 album, Jerry Lee Lewis.
- Svenne & Lotta on their LP album Bring It On Home 1978

== Song in popular culture ==
A version of the song is heard in a 2010 TV commercial for NFLShop.com. the NFL's online retailer and also appears on the soundtrack of 2011 film The Help.

Annie Ross performed the song for the 1991 horror film Basket Case 3: The Progeny.
