= Sammy Benskin =

American musician (1922–1992)

Samuel Benskin (September 27, 1922 – August 26, 1992) was an American pianist and bandleader.

He was born in The Bronx, New York City, United States, and made his professional debut around 1940 as piano accompanist to singer and guitarist Bardu Ali. He worked throughout the 1940s with jazz musicians including Stuff Smith, Benny Morton and Don Redman. By the early 1950s he had begun leading his own piano trio, as well as appearing as a soloist and as accompanist to singers including Roy Hamilton and Al Hibbler. In 1954 he also joined a group, The Three Flames, which also featured Tiger Haynes. Later in the 1950s he worked as accompanist to Dinah Washington.

In 1959, with a band credited as The Spacemen, he recorded an instrumental, "The Clouds", written and produced by Julius Dixson and issued on Dixson's Alton record label. Other session musicians playing on the record were Panama Francis, Haywood Henry, and Babe Clark. The song originally had vocals, which Dixson removed, releasing the instrumental version. This rose to No. 1 on the Billboard R&B chart, and No. 41 on the pop chart. "The Clouds" was the first number one on any chart released by an African-American owned independent record label, predating Motown's first No. 1 by a year.

From the 1960s Benskin worked primarily as a vocal coach, arranger and producer. In 1986, he recorded an album in Paris for Black & Blue Records, These Foolish Songs, which was reissued on CD in 2002. He died in Teaneck, New Jersey, aged 69.
