= Lloyd Price =

American rock and roll singer (1933–2021)

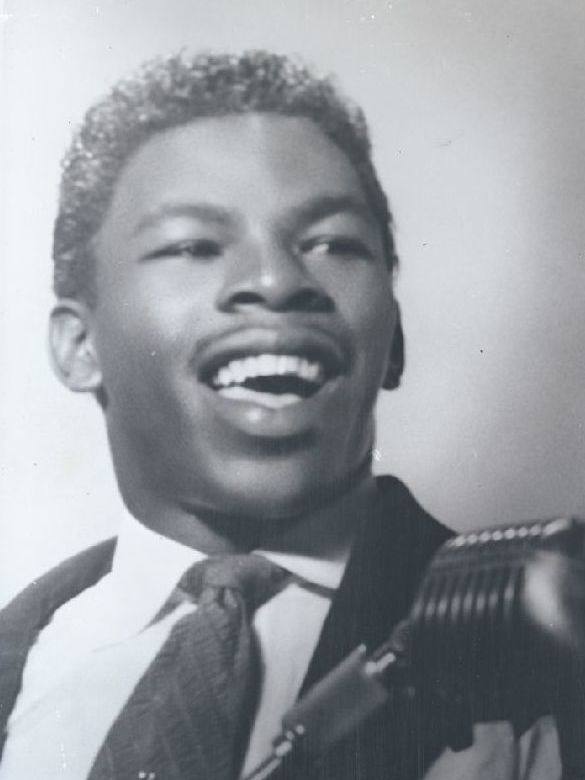
- Price in 1959

Background information
- Born: March 9, 1933; Kenner, Louisiana, U.S.
- Died: May 3, 2021 (aged 88) New Rochelle, New York, U.S.
- Genres: Rhythm and blues; rock and roll; New Orleans R&B; soul
- Occupations: Singer; songwriter; bandleader
- Years active: 1952–2019
- Labels: Specialty; KRC; ABC-Paramount; Turntable; His Master's Voice
- Website: LloydPriceMusic.com (archived 2017)

Lloyd Price (March 9, 1933 – May 3, 2021) was an American R&B and rock and roll singer known as "Mr. Personality" after his 1959 million-selling hit, "Personality". His first recording, "Lawdy Miss Clawdy", was a hit for Specialty Records in 1952. He continued to release records, but none were as popular until several years later, when he refined the New Orleans beat and achieved a series of national hits. He was inducted into the Rock and Roll Hall of Fame in 1998.

== Early life, family and education ==
Price was born on March 9, 1933, and raised in Kenner, Louisiana, a suburb of New Orleans. His mother, Beatrice Price, owned the Fish 'n' Fry Restaurant. Price picked up lifelong interests in business and food from her. He and his younger brother Leo were both musical.

He had formal training on trumpet and piano, sang in his church's gospel choir, and was a member of a combo in high school.

== Career ==
Art Rupe, the owner of Specialty Records, based in Los Angeles, came to New Orleans in 1952 to record the distinctive style of rhythm and blues developing there, which had been highly successful for his competitor Imperial Records. Rupe heard Price's song "Lawdy Miss Clawdy" and wanted to record it. Because Price did not have a band, Rupe hired Dave Bartholomew to create the arrangements and Bartholomew's band (plus Fats Domino on piano) to back Price in the recording session. The song was a massive hit, selling over one million copies and earning Price his first gold disc. His next release, "Oooh, Oooh, Oooh", cut at the same session, was a much smaller hit. Price continued making recordings for Specialty, but none of them reached the charts at that time.

In 1954, he was drafted into the US Army and sent to Korea. When he returned he found he had been replaced by Little Richard. In addition, his former chauffeur, Larry Williams, was also recording for the label, having released "Short Fat Fannie".

He eventually formed KRC Records with Harold Logan and Bill Boskent. Their first single, "Just Because", was picked up for distribution by ABC Records. From 1957 to 1959, Price recorded a series of national hits for ABC that successfully adapted the New Orleans sound, including "Stagger Lee" (which topped the Pop and R&B charts and sold over a million copies), "Personality" (which reached number 2), and "I'm Gonna Get Married" (number 3). When Price appeared on the television program American Bandstand to sing "Stagger Lee", the producer and host of the program, Dick Clark, insisted that he alter the lyrics to tone down its violent content. "Stagger Lee" was Price's version of an old blues standard, recorded many times previously by other artists. Greil Marcus, in a critical analysis of the song's history, wrote that Price's version was an enthusiastic rock rendition, "all momentum, driven by a wailing sax." In all of these early recordings by Price ("Personality", "Stagger Lee", "I'm Gonna Get Married", and others) Merritt Mel Dalton was the lead sax player; he was also in the traveling band and appeared on The Ed Sullivan Show with Price. The personnel on the original hit recording of "Stagger Lee" included Clarence Johnson on piano, John Patton on bass, Charles McClendon and Eddie Saunders on tenor sax, Ted Curson on trumpet and Sticks Simpkins on drums.

In 1962, Price along with business partner Harold Logan formed Double L Records. Wilson Pickett got his start on this label. In 1967, Price and Logan acquired the site that had formerly been the fabled jazz club Birdland, at 1678 Broadway in New York City, and they opened a new club called The Turntable. In 1969, Logan was murdered in the office connected to the club. Price then founded a new label, Turntable.

During the 1970s, Price helped the boxing promoter Don King promote fights, including the "Rumble in the Jungle" boxing match between Muhammad Ali and George Foreman in Kinshasa, Zaire and its accompanying concert which featured James Brown and B. B. King. He and Don King formed a record label, LPG, which issued Price's last hit, "What Did You Do With My Love", to limited success.

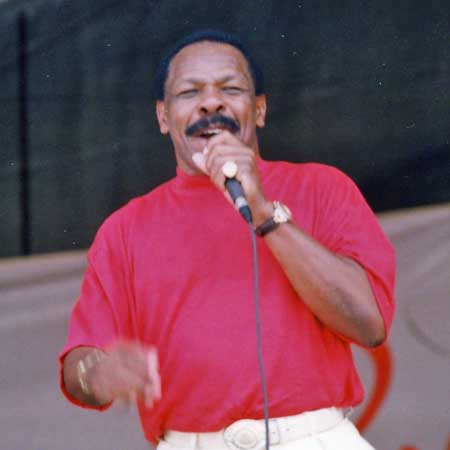
Price in 1996

Price toured Europe in 1993 with Jerry Lee Lewis, Little Richard, and Gary U.S. Bonds. He performed with soul legends Jerry Butler, Gene Chandler, and Ben E. King on the "Four Kings of Rhythm and Blues" tour in 2005; concerts were recorded for a DVD and a PBS television special.

Price appears in performance footage in the 2005 documentary film Make It Funky!, which presents a history of New Orleans music and its influence on rhythm and blues, rock and roll, funk and jazz. In the film, he performs "Lawdy Miss Clawdy" with Allen Toussaint and band.

On June 20, 2010, he appeared and sang in the season 1 finale of the HBO series Treme. As of 2018 he continued to sing.

=== Other pursuits ===
Price was a prolific entrepreneur. In addition to his music production and publication ownership, he started and owned businesses in various industries. He owned two construction companies, erecting middle-income housing in the 1980s in the Bronx and also homes in Staten Island.

He managed Global Icon Brands (a.k.a. Lloyd Price Icon Food Brands), which makes a line of Southern-style foods, including Lawdy Miss Clawdy food products, ranging from canned greens to sweet potato cookies, and a line of Lloyd Price foods, such as Lloyd Price's Soulful 'n' Smooth Grits and Lloyd Price's Energy-2-Eat Bar, plus Lawdy Miss Clawdy clothing and collectibles.

In 2011, Price released his autobiography, The True King of the Fifties: The Lloyd Price Story, and worked on a Broadway musical, Lawdy Miss Clawdy, focused on his life and rise to stardom with a team that included the producer Phil Ramone. The musical also told how rock and roll evolved from the New Orleans music scene of the early 1950s. That musical evolved to become the 2023 production Personality: The Lloyd Price Musical, which opened at the Studebaker Theater in Chicago to positive reviews.

== Honors and awards ==
Association	Year	Award	Results
Rhythm and Blues Foundation	1994	Pioneer Award	Honored
	1995	Lloyd Price Avenue, Kenner, Louisiana	Honored
Rock and Roll Hall of Fame	1998	Inductee	Honored
Southern University	2001	Honorary Doctorate	Honored
National Black Sports & Entertainment Hall of Fame	2001	Inductee	Honored
Louisiana Hall of Fame	2010	Inductee	Honored
National Rhythm and Blues Hall of Fame	2019	Inductee	Honored

The city of Kenner, Louisiana celebrates an annual Lloyd Price Day.

== Personal life and death ==
Price and his wife resided in Westchester County, New York. He died from diabetes complications on May 3, 2021, at a long-term care facility in New Rochelle, New York, aged 88.

== Discography ==
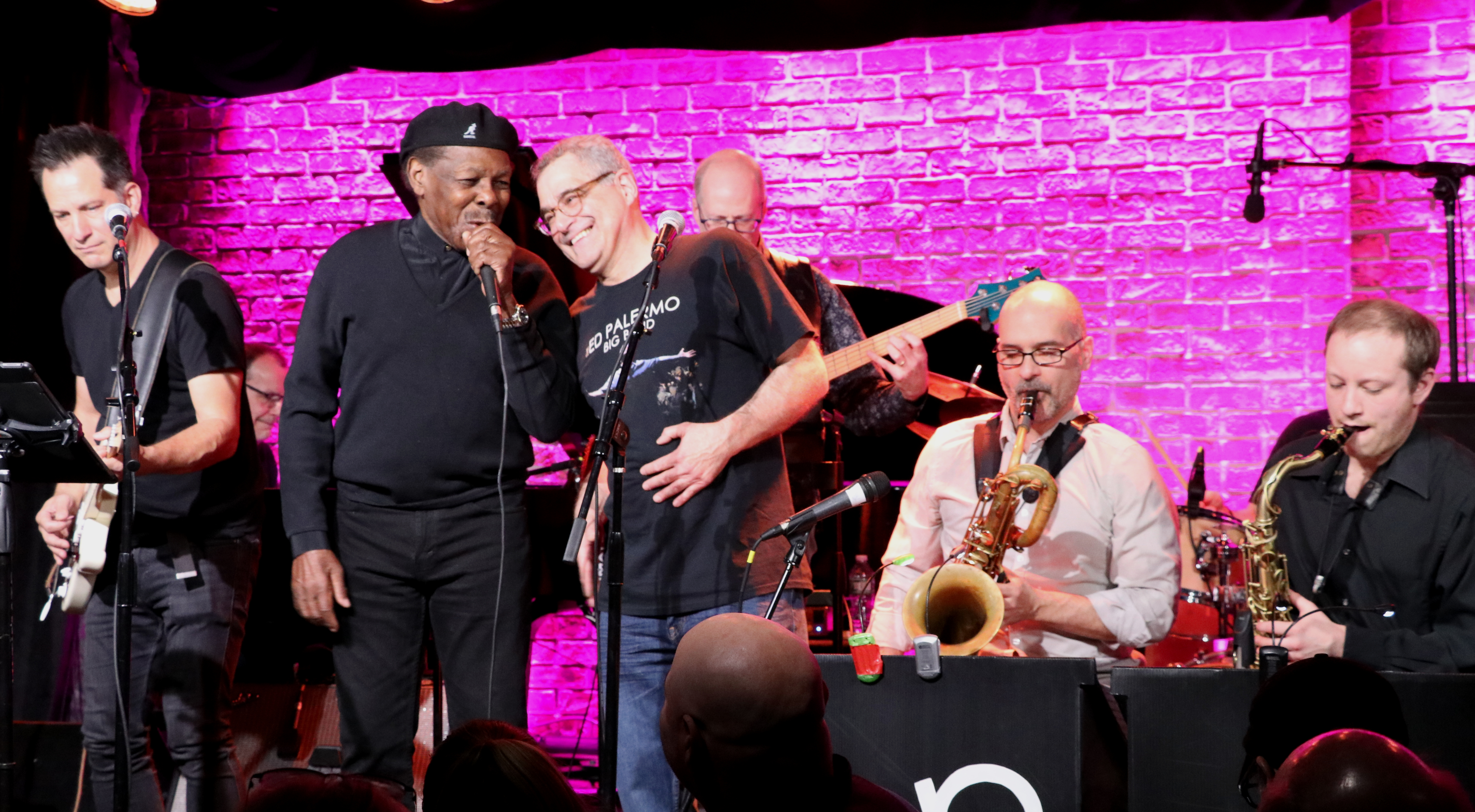
Price with the Ed Palermo Big Band, 2018

=== Studio albums ===
- 1959: The Exciting Lloyd Price
- 1959: Mr. Personality
- 1959: Mr. Personality Sings the Blues
- 1960: The Fantastic Lloyd Price
- 1961: Cookin'
- 1961: Sings the Million-Sellers
- 1963: This Is My Band
- 1963: Misty
- 1965: Lloyd Swings for Sammy
- 1969: Now!
- 1972: To the Roots and Back
- 1976: Music-Music
- 1978: The Nominee
- 1998: Body with No Body
- 2002: Christmas Classics
- 2012: I'm Feeling Good!

=== Compilation albums ===
- 1960: Mr. Personality's 15 Hits
- 1969: Lloyd Price Now
- 1981: This Is My Band
- 1989: Lloyd Price: His Originals, Specialty
- 1990: Greatest Hits, Pair
- 1990: Walkin' the Track, Specialty
- 1990: Personality Plus, Specialty
- 1992: Stagger Lee, Collectables
- 1994: Lloyd Price Sings His Big Ten, Curb
- 1994: Vol. 2: Heavy Dreams, Specialty
- 1994: Greatest Hits: The Original ABC-Paramount Recordings, MCA
- 1995: Lawdy Miss Clawdy, Ace
- 1998: Body with No Body, Moms
- 1999: Mr Personality, Sba
- 1999: The Exciting, Sba
- 2002: Christmas Classics, Prestige
- 2002: Millennium Collection, Universal
- 2004: The Chronological Lloyd Price: 1952–1953, Classics
- 2005: Lawdy!, Fantasy
- 2006: Specialty Profiles, Specialty
- 2006: Great, Goldies
- 2006: 16 Greatest Hits, Passport

=== Singles ===
Lloyd Price singles
Year	Single (A-side, B-side, both sides from same album except where indicated)	Chart positions				Album
Year	Single (A-side, B-side, both sides from same album except where indicated)	US	US R&B	UK	AUS	Album
1952	"Lawdy Miss Clawdy" / "Mailman Blues"	—	1	—	—	Lloyd Price
1952	"Oooh-Oooh-Oooh" /	—	4	—	—	Non-album tracks
1952	"Restless Heart"	—	5	—	—	Non-album tracks
1953	"Ain't It a Shame" /	—	4	—	—	Personality Plus
1953	"Tell Me Pretty Baby"	—	8	—	—	Lloyd Price
1953	"What's the Matter Now?" / "So Long" (from Lloyd Price)	—	—	—	—	Walkin' The Track
1953	"Where You At?" / "Baby Don't Turn Your Back on Me" (non-album track)	—	—	—	—	Lloyd Price
1953	"I Wish Your Picture Was You" / "Frog Legs" (from Walkin' the Track)	—	—	—	—	Lloyd Price
1954	"Too Late for Tears" / "Let Me Come Home Baby" (non-album track)	—	—	—	—	Lloyd Price
1954	"Jimmie Lee" / "Walkin' the Track" (from Walkin' the Track)	—	—	—	—	Lloyd Price
1954	"Chee-Koo Baby" / "Oo-Ee Baby" (from Walkin' the Track)	—	—	—	—	Lloyd Price
1955	"Lord, Lord, Amen!" / "Tryin' to Find Someone to Love"	—	—	—	—	Non-album tracks
1956	"Just Because" / "Why" (original release on KRC)	—	—	—	—	The Exciting Lloyd Price
1956	"I Yi Yi Gomen-A-Sai (I'm Sorry)" / "Woe Ho Ho" (non-album track)	—	—	—	—	Walkin' the Track
1956	"Country Boy Rock" / "Rock 'n' Roll Dance" (non-album track)	—	—	—	—	Lloyd Price
1956	"Forgive Me, Clawdy" / "I'm Glad, Glad"	—	—	—	—	Walkin' the Track
1957	"Just Because" / "Why" (second release on ABC-Paramount)	29	3	—	—	The Exciting Lloyd Price
1957	"Baby, Please Come Home" / "Breaking My Heart (All Over Again)"	—	—	—	—	Non-album tracks
1957	"Lonely Chair" / "The Chicken and the Bop"	88	—	—	—	Non-album tracks
1957	"Georgianna" / "Hello Little Girl"	—	—	—	—	Non-album tracks
1957	"Mailman Blues" / "Oh, Oh, Oh"	—	—	—	—	The Exciting Lloyd Price
1958	"To Love and Be Loved" / "How Many Times"	—	—	—	—	Non-album tracks
1958	"No Limit to Love" / "Such a Mess"	—	—	—	—	Mr. Rhythm & Blues
1958	"Stagger Lee" / "You Need Love"	1	1	7	8	The Exciting Lloyd Price
1959	"Where Were You (On Our Wedding Day?)" / "Is It Really Love?" (from Mr. "Personality")	23	4	15	62	The Exciting Lloyd Price
1959	"Personality" / "Have You Ever Had the Blues"	2	1	9	1	Mr. "Personality"
1959	"Gonna Let You Come Back Home" / "Down by the River" (from Mr. Rhythm & Blues)	—	—	—	—	Non-album track
1959	"I'm Gonna Get Married" /	3	1	23	2	Mr. "Personality"
1959	"Three Little Pigs"	—	15	—	—	"Mr. Personality's" 15 Hits
1960	"Come into My Heart" /	20	2	—	36	"Mr. Personality's" 15 Hits
1960	"Wont'cha Come Home"	43	6	—	92	"Mr. Personality's" 15 Hits
1960	"Lady Luck"	14	3	45	41	"Mr. Personality's" 15 Hits
1960	"Never Let Me Go"	82	26	—	—	"Mr. Personality's" 15 Hits
1960	"No If's – No And's"	40	16	—	58	Non-album tracks
1960	"For Love"	43	—	—	—	Non-album tracks
1960	"Question" / "If I Look a Little Blue"	19	5	—	61	Non-album tracks
1960	"Just Call Me (And I'll Understand)"	79	—	—	73	Non-album tracks
1960	"Who Coulda' Told You (They Lied)"	103	—	—	—	Non-album tracks
1961	"You Better Know What You're Doin'" / "That's Why Tears Come and Go" (from Cookin')	90	—	—	—	Non-album tracks
1961	"Boo Hoo" / "I Made You Cry"	—	—	—	—	Non-album tracks
1961	"One Hundred Percent" / "Say, I'm the One"	—	—	—	—	Non-album tracks
1961	"String of Pearls" / "Chantilly Lace"	—	—	—	—	Non-album tracks
1961	"Mary and Man-O" / "I Ain't Givin' Up Nothin'"	110	—	—	—	Non-album tracks
1961	"Talk to Me" / "I Cover the Waterfront"	—	—	—	—	"Mr. Personality" Sings the Blues
1962	"Be a Leader" / "'Nother Fairy Tale"	—	—	—	—	Non-album tracks
1962	"Twistin' the Blues" / "Popeye's Irresistable You"	—	—	—	—	Non-album tracks
1962	"Your Picture" / "Counterfeit Friends"	—	—	—	—	Non-album tracks
1962	"Under Your Spell Again" / "Happy Birthday Mama"	123	—	—	—	Non-album tracks
1963	"Who's Sorry Now" / "Hello Bill"	—	—	—	—	Non-album tracks
1963	"Pistol' Packin' Mama" / "Tennessee Waltz"	—	—	—	—	Misty
1963	"Misty" / "Cry On"	21	11	—	—	Misty
1963	"Auld Lang Syne" / "Merry Christmas, Mama"	—	—	—	—	Non-album tracks
1964	"Billie Baby" / "Try a Little Bit of Tenderness"	84	38	—	—	Non-album tracks
1964	"You're Nobody Till Somebody Loves You" / "I'll Be a Fool for You" (non-album track)	—	—	—	—	Misty
1964	"I Love You, I Just Love You" / "Don't Cry"	123	—	—	—	Lloyd Price Swings for Sammy
1964	"Amen" / "I'd Fight the World" (non-album track)	124	—	—	—	Lloyd Price Swings for Sammy
1965	"Woman" / "Oh, Lady Luck"	—	—	—	—	Lloyd Price Swings for Sammy
1965	"If I Had My Life to Live Over" / "Two for Love"	107	—	—	—	Non-album tracks
1965	"You're Reading Me" / "Go On, Little Girl"	—	—	—	—	Non-album tracks
1966	"Misty" (re-recording) / "Saturday Night"	—	—	—	—	Non-album tracks
1966	"Peeping and Hiding" / "Every Night"	—	—	—	—	Non-album tracks
1966	"The Man Who Took the Valise off the Floor of Grand Central Station at Noon" / "I Won't Cry Anymore"	—	—	—	—	Non-album tracks
1967	"Cupid's Bandwagon" / "Feelin' Good"	—	—	—	—	Non-album tracks
1968	"Send Me Some Lovin'" / "Somewhere Along the Way"	—	—	—	—	Non-album tracks
1968	"Take All" / "Luv, Luv, Luv"	—	—	—	—	Non-album tracks
1968	"The Truth" / "Don't Stop Now"	—	—	—	—	Non-album tracks
1969	"The Grass Will Sing for You" / "I Understand"	—	—	—	—	Lloyd Price Now
1969	"Bad Conditions" / "The Truth" (non-album track)	—	21	—	—	Lloyd Price Now
1970	"Little Volcano" / "Lawdy Miss Clawdy"	—	—	—	—	Non-album tracks
1971	"Hooked on a Feeling" / "If You Really Love Him"	—	—	—	—	The Best of Lloyd Price
1971	"Natural Sinner" / "Mr. and Mrs. Untrue"	—	—	—	—	The Best of Lloyd Price
1972	"Sing a Song"	—	—	—	—	To the Roots and Back
1972	"In the Eyes of God" / "The Legend of Nigger Charley"	—	—	—	—	Non-album tracks
1973	"Love Music" / "Just For Baby" (non-album track)	—	—	—	—	Music-Music
1973	"Trying to Slip Away" / "They Get Down" (from To the Roots and Back)	—	32	—	—	Golden Dozen
1974	"Glitter Graphics" / "Glitter Queen"	—	—	—	—	Non-album tracks
1976	"What Did You Do with My Love" / "Love Music"	—	99	—	—	Music-Music
"—" denotes releases that did not chart or were not released in that territory.
