= Al Caiola =

American guitarist, composer and arranger (1920–2016)

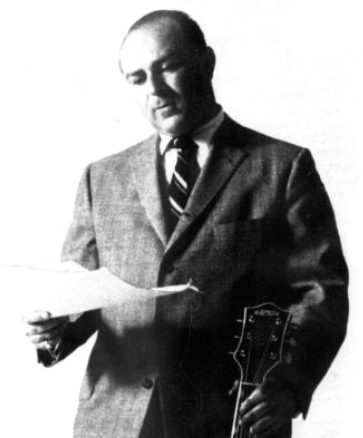
- Caiola in a 1961 DownBeat advertisement

Background information
- Born: Alexander Emil Caiola; September 7, 1920; Jersey City, New Jersey, U.S.
- Died: November 9, 2016 (aged 96) Allendale, New Jersey
- Genres: Jazz, country, rock, pop
- Occupations: Musician, conductor, arranger, songwriter
- Instrument: Guitar
- Years active: 1955–1969; 1980–2016
- Labels: Atco, Chancellor, Coral, His Master's Voice, RCA, Roulette, Savoy, Time, United Artists, Durium
- Formerly of: The Living Trio, Roy Ross and the Ragamuffins with Dizzy Gillespie, The Village Stompers, The Ragtimers

Alexander Emil Caiola (September 7, 1920 – November 9, 2016) was an American guitarist, composer and arranger, who spanned a variety of music genres including jazz, country, rock, and pop. He recorded over fifty albums and worked with some of the biggest names in music during the 20th century, including Elvis Presley, Ray Conniff, Ferrante & Teicher, Frank Sinatra, Percy Faith, Astor Piazzolla, Buddy Holly, Mitch Miller, and Tony Bennett.

== Early life ==
Alexander Emil Caiola was born in Jersey City, New Jersey to Emil Caiola and Genevieve Esposito. His father was employed as a barber.

At a young age, Caiola first expressed an interest in a musical career solely as a vocalist. He was soon persuaded by his father to also pursue professional opportunities as an instrumentalist instead. This led Caiola to take up the banjo and subsequently the guitar.

By the age of 11, he emerged as a child prodigy on the guitar and undertook formal studies with Anthony Antone in New York City and subsequently with the guitarist Peter Milano in Jersey City. As a young teenager, he was influenced by the performances of Eddie Lang and Bing Crosby and studied Lang's method book for guitarists closely. By the age of sixteen he appeared as both a vocalist and guitarist on the children's radio program Sally and Sam in collaboration with Tony Mottola. During this time Mottola encouraged Caiola to master new performance techniques.

After returning from military service during World War II, Caiola pursued formal musical studies at the New Jersey College of Music. Over the years, he also completed studies with the guitarist Harry Volpe.

== Career ==
During World War II Caiola played trumpet with the United States Marine Corps 5th Marine Division Band that also included Bob Crosby. Caiola served in the Battle of Iwo Jima as a stretcher bearer.

After returning from the war, Caiola embarked upon an extended engagement as a staff musician on the CBS network from 1946 until 1956. As part of his audition, he was required to appear on shows with Gordon MacRae, Archie Bleyer and the vocalist Patty Clayton. After signing with CBS, Caiola also collaborated on several major network TV productions with Arthur Godfrey (Talent Scouts), Ed Sullivan (Toast of the Town) and Jackie Gleason (The Jackie Gleason Show) under the direction of the conductor Ray Bloch.

Caiola was also a successful studio musician in the 1950s in New York City. He released some minor records under his own name in that decade. In addition, he performed under the musical direction of John Serry Sr. on an easy listening album for Dot Records in 1956, which received favorable critical reviews in The Billboard magazine and The Cash Box magazine.(Squeeze Play). Later in the decade in 1959, his collaboration with Tony Mottola and Johnny Mathis on the smash album Open Fire, Two Guitars for Columbia Records also received favorable reviews.

In 1960 he became a recording star on the United Artists label for over ten years. He had hits in 1961 with "The Magnificent Seven" (No. 35 in US and No. 27 in Canada.) and "Bonanza" (No. 19 in US and No. 19 in Canada.) The arrangements were typically by Don Costa, using a large orchestral backing.

Caiola released singles and albums throughout the 1960s and beyond, though no others appeared on the charts except for an entry in 1964 with "From Russia with Love". United Artists used him to make commercial recordings of many movie and TV themes: "Wagon Train (Wagons Ho)", "The Ballad of Paladin", "The Rebel", and "Gunslinger". His album Solid Gold Guitar contained arrangements of "Jezebel", "Two Guitars", "Big Guitar", "I Walk the Line", and "Guitar Boogie".

The Magnificent Seven album, other than the title track, consisted of a variety of pop songs with a jazzy bent. Guitars Guitars Guitars was similar. There was a wide variety to his albums — soft pop, Italian, Hawaiian, country, jazz. In the early 1970s he continued on the Avalanche Recordings label, producing similar work including the album Theme From the 'Magnificent 7 Ride' '73. Later, on other labels, came some ethnic-themed instrumental albums such as In a Spanish Mood in 1982, and Italian instrumentals. In 1976, Caiola accompanied Sergio Franchi, Dana Valery, and Wayne J. Kirby (Franchi's musical director) on a concert tour to Johannesburg, South Africa.

At the urging of the talent agency Ashley-Famous, Caiola appeared in concert in Las Vegas during the 1960s in addition to operating his own music publishing firm Alpane Music. He is credited with serving as both an arranger, conductor and soloist on many of his recordings. In later years, Cailo continued to perform and even toured with Frank Sinatra in 1991. During the course of his professional career, Caiola also performed under the musical direction of several leading conductors including: Percy Faith, Morton Gould and Andre Kostelanetz.

== Death ==
Caiola died in Allendale, New Jersey, at the age of 96.

== Performance style ==
Al Caiola has been described as an artist who projected a "light" or "liquid" touch during his performances on the guitar. His pianist, Mo Wechsler observed that he was a versatile well rounded musician who was comfortable playing either jazz, rock and roll and even classical music.

== Discography ==
- Serenade in Blue (Savoy, 1956)
- Music for Space Squirrels (Atco, 1958)
- Deep in a Dream (Savoy, 1958)
- High Strung (RCA Victor, 1959)
- Guitars Guitars Guitars (United Artists, 1960)
- Percussion Espanol (Time, 1960)
- Great Pickin' with Don Arnone (Chancellor, 1960)
- Salute Italia! (Roulette, 1960)
- Gershwin and Guitars (Time, 1960)
- Guitar of Plenty (Time, 1960)
- Italian Guitars (Time, 1960)
- Guitars Woodwinds and Bongos (United Artists, 1960)
- Golden Hit Instrumentals (United Artists, 1961)
- Hit Instrumentals from Western TV Themes (United Artists, 1961)
- Cleopatra and All That Jazz (United Artists, 1962)
- The Guitar Style of Al Caiola (RCA Camden, 1962)
- Solid Gold Guitar (United Artists, 1962)
- Golden Guitar (United Artists, 1962)
- Greasy Kid Stuff (United Artists, 1962)
- Spanish Guitars (Time, 1962)
- City Guy Plays Country (United Artists, 1963)
- 50 Fabulous Guitar Favorites (United Artists, 1964)
- Guitar for Lovers (United Artists, 1964)
- The Magic World of Italy (Roulette, 1964)
- 50 Fabulous Italian Favorites (United Artists, 1964)
- On the Trail (United Artists, 1964)
- Tuff Guitar (United Artists, 1965)
- Solid Gold Guitar Goes Hawaiian (United Artists, 1965)
- Sounds for Spies and Private Eyes (United Artists, 1965)
- Tuff Guitar English Style (United Artists, 1965)
- Tuff Guitar Tijuana Style (United Artists, 1966)
- Romantico (United Artists, 1966)
- King Guitar (United Artists, 1967)
- The Power of Brass (United Artists, 1968)
- It Must Be Him (United Artists, 1968)
- Let the Sunshine In (United Artists, 1969)
- Soft Guitars (Bainbridge, 1980)
- In a Spanish Mood (Accord, 1982)
- Amigo & Other Songs (Aurora, 1993)
- Encore! Oro Italiano (Alanna, 2001)
- Guitar for Latin Lovers (Alanna, 2001)
- The Manhattan Guitars (Alanna, 2002)
- Classic Italian Love Songs (Alanna, 2005)

== Partial studio recordings list ==
External audio
- You may hear Al Caiola performing the songs Granada and Secret Love from the album Squeeze Play with John Serry Sr. as released on Chicago Musette: John Serry et son Accordéon in 1958 Here on Gallica.BnF
- You may hear Al Caiola performing with John Serry on the album Squeeze Play in 1956 Here on archive.org

- Enzo Stuarti - One album Jubilee in 1964: "Stuarti Arrives at Carnegie Hall" - Al Caiola, guest artist for entire live performance
- Paul Anka — "Diana", "Lonely Boy", "My Way", "Puppy Love", "Put Your Head on My Shoulder", "Times of Your Life"
- Louis Armstrong — "Back O'Town Blues", "Mop! Mop!", "Blueberry Hill" (All three tracks recorded live in 1947)
- Frankie Avalon — "DeDe Dinah", "Venus"
- Burt Bacharach — "Bridget Bardo"
- Pearl Bailey — "I Got Plenty o' Nuttin'", "Westport"
- LaVern Baker — "I Cried a Tear", "I'm Leaving You", banjo on "Humpty Dumpty Heart"
- Tony Bennett — "Boulevard of Broken Dreams", "Climb Ev'ry Mountain", "Stranger in Paradise"
- Ruth Brown — "Miss Rhythm", "Late Date with Ruth Brown"
- Solomon Burke — "Cry to Me"
- Petula Clark — "Don't Sleep in the Subway", "This Is My Song"
- Rosemary Clooney — "Come on a My House", "Half as Much", "Hey There", "This Ole House"
- Perry Como — "Don't Let the Stars Get in Your Eyes", "Patricia", "Temptation"
- Ray Conniff, His Orchestra And Chorus — "Melody for Two Guitars"
- The Crickets — "Rave On!", "That's My Desire"
- King Curtis & Al Caiola — "Guitar Boogie Shuffle"
- Bobby Darin — "Artificial Flowers", "Bill Bailey", "Dream Lover", "Mack the Knife", "Queen of the Hop", "Splish Splash", "That's All"
- Peter De Angelis Orchestra & Chorus featuring Al Caiola — "The Happy Mandolin"
- Fabian — "Tiger", "Turn Me Loose", "Hound Dog Man"
- Percy Faith — "The Theme from A Summer Place"
- Ferrante & Teicher — "Airport Love Theme", "Theme from Exodus"
- Eddie Fisher — "Any Time", "Dungaree Doll", "On the Street Where You Live", "Oh! My Pa-Pa"
- The Four Lads — "Love Is a Many-Splendored Thing", "Moments to Remember", "No, Not Much", "Standing on the Corner"
- Sergio Franchi - Two entire RCA Victor albums in 1968: "I'm A Fool to Want You" & "Wine and Song"
- Connie Francis — "Al-Di-La", "Arrivederci Roma", "Mama", "Summertime in Venice"
- Jackie Gleason — "From Russia with Love", "Melancholy Serenade"
- The Bobby Hackett Quartet — entire "You Stepped Out of a Dream" album
- Herbie Hancock — "Deck the Halls"
- Woody Herman — "Body and Soul", "Caldonia", "Early Autumn", "Mood Indigo"
- Al Hirt — "Big Honey", "Puppet on a String"
- Buddy Holly — "I'm Gonna Love You Too", "It Doesn't Matter Anymore", "Moondreams", "True Love Ways"
- The Hugo & Luigi Chorus — "It Happened in Monterey"
- Ivory Joe Hunter — "Empty Arms", "Love's a Hurting Game"
- Mahalia Jackson — "He's Got the Whole World in His Hands", "I See God", "You're Not Living In Vain"
- Willis Jackson — "Back Door", "Lator Gator"
- Ben E. King — "Spanish Harlem", "Stand by Me"
- Andre Kostelanetz — "The Impossible Dream", "My Favorite Things"
- Frankie Laine — "Lonely Man", "Moonlight Gambler"
- Brenda Lee — "Fairyland", "One Step at a Time"
- Peggy Lee — "Lean On Me", "Spinning Wheel"
- Jerry Lee Lewis — "Let's Talk About Us", "To Make Love Sweeter For You"
- Julie London — "Lonely Girl", "Remember"
- Al Martino — "Spanish Eyes"
- Johnny Mathis — "Chances Are", "It's Not for Me to Say", "Misty", "Smile", "The Twelfth of Never"
- Howard McGhee — "Life is Just a Bowl of Cherries" (Bethlehem, 1956)
- The McGuire Sisters — "Sugartime"
- Helen Merrill — "It's De-Lovely"
- Mitch Miller — "The Yellow Rose of Texas", most "Sing Along with Mitch" albums
- Guy Mitchell — "Knee Deep in the Blues", "Run with the Best"
- Lou Monte — "Lazy Mary", "Pepino the Italian Mouse"
- Claus Ogerman — "Lyric Suite"
- Elvis Presley — "Santa Lucia"
- Johnnie Ray — "Just Walkin' in the Rain", "Soliloquy of a Fool"
- Henri René And His Orchestra — entire "Compulsion To Swing" album
- Marty Robbins — "A White Sport Coat", "She Was Only Seventeen", "The Story of My Life"
- Neil Sedaka — "Breaking Up Is Hard to Do", "Calendar Girl", "Happy Birthday Sweet Sixteen", "Next Door to an Angel"
- John Serry Sr. - "Granada (song)", "Secret Love (Doris Day song)", "Side By Side (1927 song)", "My Heart Cries for You", "Button Up Your Overcoat", "Terry's Theme"
- Del Shannon — "Hats Off to Larry", "Little Town Flirt", "Runaway"
- Simon & Garfunkel — "Mrs. Robinson", "Old Friends", "Bridge over Troubled Water" (also see Tom & Jerry)
- Frank Sinatra — "Bye Bye Baby", "Don't Cry Joe", "Drinking Again", "It All Depends on You"
- Somethin' Smith and the Redheads — "It's Gonna Snowflow", "Love Is a Gamble"
- Barbra Streisand — "Bye Bye Blackbird"
- Tom & Jerry (Simon & Garfunkel) — "Baby Talk"
- Sarah Vaughan — "Autumn in New York", "Lullaby of Birdland", "Moonlight in Vermont", "On a Clear Day You Can See Forever"
- The Village Stompers - "Washington Square"
- Dinah Washington — entire "What a Diff'rence a Day Makes!" album
- Andy Williams — "Butterfly", "Canadian Sunset"
- Joe Williams — "I Should Have Kissed Her More", "On the Sunny Side of the Street"
- Chuck Willis — "C. C. Rider" (also known as "See See Rider"), "Hang Up My Rock 'N' Roll Shoes", "What Am I Living For"
- Hugo Winterhalter — "Blue Tango", "Count Every Star"
