= Bus Stop (TV series) =

Drama TV series (1961-62)

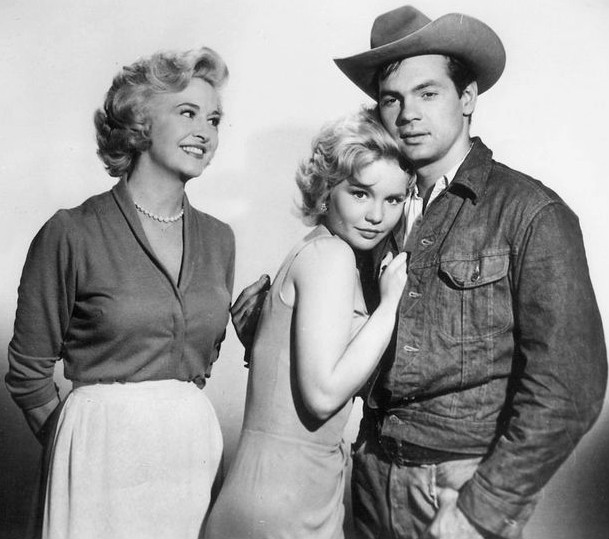
- Marilyn Maxwell, Tuesday Weld and Gary Lockwood in "Cherie" (1961)
- Genre: Drama
- Created by: Roy Huggins (based on William Inge's play, Bus Stop)
- Directed by: Robert Altman (selected episodes)
- Starring: Marilyn Maxwell; Richard Anderson; Rhodes Reason; Joan Freeman
- Theme music composer: Arthur Morton
- Composers: Arthur Morton; Lionel Newman; Jeff Alexander
- Country of origin: United States
- Original language: English
- No. of seasons: 1
- No. of episodes: 26

Production
- Executive producers: William Self; Roy Huggins
- Producers: Robert Blees; John Newland (final episode)
- Running time: 60 minutes
- Production companies: Belmont Television Company, Inc. Palomino Productions, Inc. (final episode), in association with 20th Century-Fox Television

Original release
- Network: ABC
- Release: October 1, 1961 – March 25, 1962

Bus Stop is a 26-episode American drama which aired on ABC from October 1, 1961, until March 25, 1962, starring Marilyn Maxwell as Grace Sherwood, the owner of a bus station and diner in the fictitious town of Sunrise in the Colorado Rockies. The program was adapted from William Inge's play, Bus Stop, and Inge was a script consultant for the series, which followed the lives of travelers passing through the bus station and the diner. Maxwell's co-stars were Richard Anderson as District Attorney Glenn Wagner, Rhodes Reason as Sheriff Will Mayberry, Joan Freeman as waitress Elma Gahrigner, and Bernard Kates as Ralph the coroner. Increasingly, as it became difficult to have guest stars be characters arriving by bus every week, the stories became more about people in the town which left little for Maxwell's character to do and led to her leaving the series after 13 episodes. She said, "There was nothing for me to do but pour a second cup of coffee and point the way to the men's room."

== Episodes ==
No.	Title	Directed by	Written by	Original release date
1	"Afternoon Of A Cowboy"	Stuart Rosenberg	Sally Benson (teleplay), Rex O'Haogain	October 1, 1961
2	"Success Story"	Stuart Rosenberg	Luther Davis (teleplay), Rex O'Haogain	October 8, 1961
3	"The Resurrection of Annie Ahern"	Don Medford	Don M. Mankewicz & Jerome Thomas (teleplay), Robert L. Palmer	October 15, 1961
4	"The Covering Darkness"	Robert Altman	Jean Holloway & John Meredyth Lucas	October 22, 1961
5	"Portrait of a Hero"	Robert Altman	Luther Davis (teleplay), Jonathan Hughes	October 29, 1961
6	"The Glass Jungle"	Francis D. Lyon	Norman Jacob	November 5, 1961
7	"Cherie"	Don Siegel	Robert Blees (teleplay), William Inge	November 12, 1961
8	"Accessory By Consent"	Robert Altman	Gilbert Ralston (teleplay), Stephen Becker	November 19, 1961
9	"The Man From Bootstrap"	Joseph Pevney	Howard Browne	November 26, 1961
10	"A Lion Walks Among Us"	Robert Altman	Ellis Kadison (teleplay), Tom Wicker	December 3, 1961
11	"Call Back Yesterday"	Lamont Johnson	Samson Raphaelson	December 10, 1961
12	"...And The Pursuit Of Evil"	Robert Altman	Dennis Arbuthnot & Howard Browne (teleplay), Wilbur Daniel Steele	December 17, 1961
13	"The Runaways"	Arthur Hiller	Sally Benson (teleplay), Kurt Vonnegut, Jr.	December 24, 1961
14	"Jaws Of Darkness"	Stuart Rosenberg	Alvin Sargent (teleplay), Henry Farrell	December 31, 1961
15	"Summer Lightning"	Robert Altman	Harry Kleiner (teleplay), John Whittier	January 7, 1962
16	"Cry To Heaven"	Stuart Rosenberg	John Francis O'Mara (teleplay), Nunnally Johnson, Patrick Quentin	January 14, 1962
17	"The Stubborn Stumbos"	Richard L. Bare	Edmund L. Hartmann (teleplay), Jean Muir	January 21, 1962
18	"Turn Home Again"	Stuart Rosenberg	Harry Kleiner (teleplay), Howard Browne	January 28, 1962
19	"How Does Charlie Feel?"	Richard L. Bare	Roy Huggins	February 4, 1962
20	"Put Your Dreams Away"	Ted Post	Harry Kleiner (teleplay), Howard Browne	February 11, 1962
21	"The Opposite Virtues"	Herman Hoffman	James P. Cavanaugh & Marie Baumer	February 18, 1962
22	"The Ordeal of Kevin Brooke"	James B. Clark	Frank Fenton (teleplay), Rex O'Haogain	February 25, 1962
23	"Door Without A Key"	Robert Altman	Howard Browne (teleplay), Robert Altman	March 4, 1962
24	"Verdict of 12"	Felix E. Feist	Harry Kleiner (teleplay), Howard Browne	March 11, 1962
25	"County General"	Robert Altman	David Shaw	March 18, 1962
26	"I Kiss Your Shadow"	John Newland	Barry Trivers (teleplay), Robert Bloch	March 25, 1962

== Controversial episode ==
The episode "A Lion Walks Among Us", with guest star Fabian Forte and directed by Robert Altman, was highly controversial because of its depiction of violence. Twenty-five ABC affiliates refused to air the program. It attracted negative comment from politicians in Washington. The episode was shown to a Congressional Committee discussing violence on TV.
