= Tuesday Weld =

American actress (born 1943)

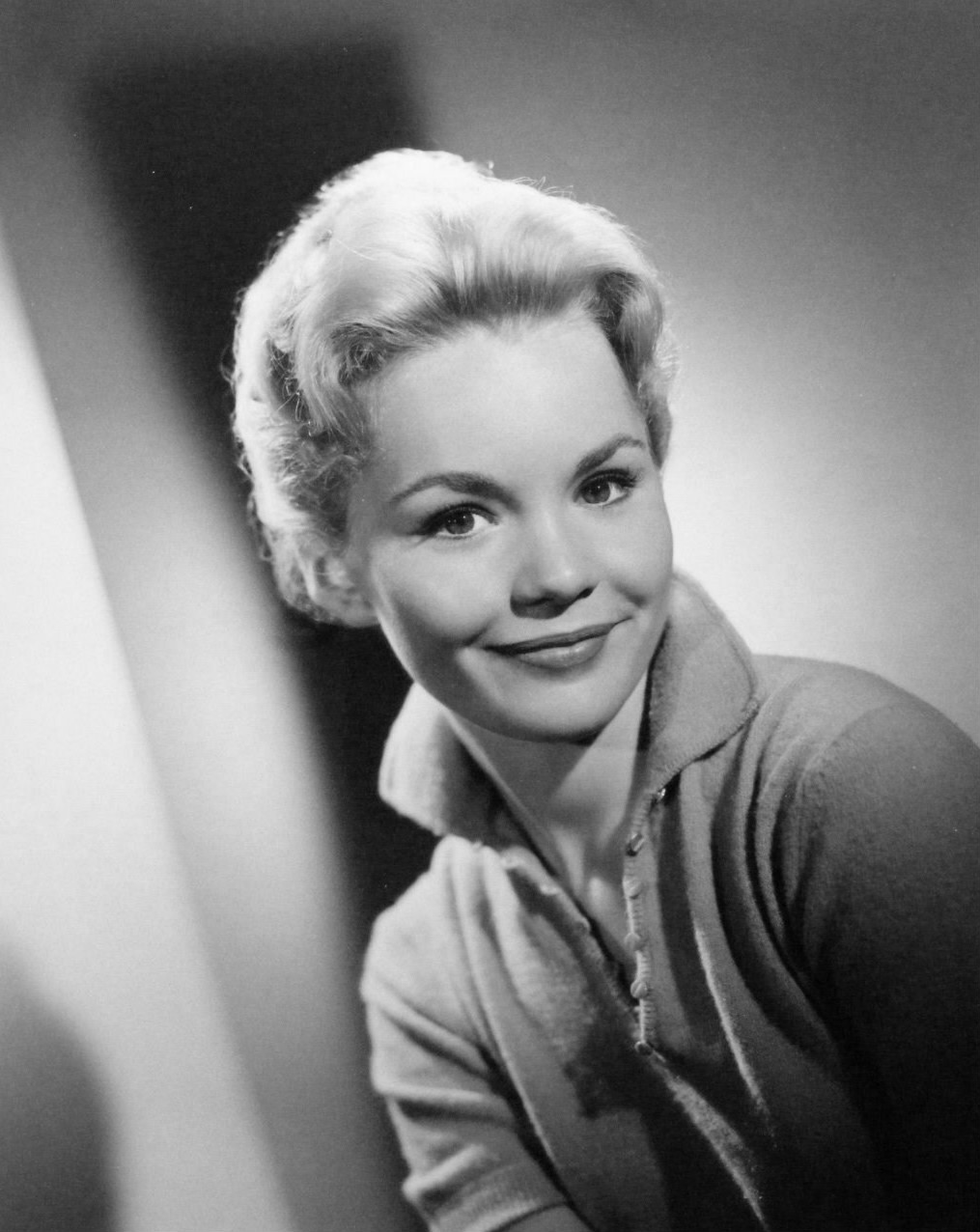
- Weld, c. 1960
- Born: Susan Ker Weld; August 27, 1943 (age 83); New York City, U.S.
- Occupation: Actress
- Years active: 1955–2001
- Spouses: Claude Harz (m. 1965; div. 1971); Dudley Moore (m. 1975; div. 1980); Pinchas Zukerman (m. 1985; div. 2001)
- Children: 2

Tuesday Weld (born Susan Ker Weld; August 27, 1943) is an American retired actress. She began acting as a child and progressed to mature roles in the late 1950s. She won a Golden Globe Award for Most Promising Female Newcomer in 1960. Over the following decade, she established a career playing dramatic roles in films.

Weld often portrayed impulsive and reckless women and was nominated for a Golden Globe for Play It as It Lays (1972), an Academy Award for Best Supporting Actress for Looking for Mr. Goodbar (1977), an Emmy Award for The Winter of Our Discontent (1983), and a BAFTA for Once Upon a Time in America (1984). After the 1980s her acting appearances became infrequent, and her last role was in 2001's Chelsea Walls.

== Early life ==
Weld was born in Manhattan. Her father was Lathrop Motley Weld, of the Weld family of Massachusetts. Her father died in 1947 at the age of 49, shortly before his daughter's fourth birthday. Her mother, Yosene Balfour Ker, was born in Ealing, Middlesex, England, and was the daughter of the artist and Life illustrator William Balfour Ker, who was of Scottish descent, and related to the inventor Alexander Graham Bell. She was Lathrop Weld's fourth and last wife.

Weld had a brother and sister. Her name became Tuesday, an extension of her childhood nickname, "Tu-Tu", so named by a young cousin who could not pronounce "Susan". She legally changed her name to Tuesday Weld on October 9, 1959.

== Career ==
=== Early career ===
Left in financial difficulty by her husband's death, Weld's mother put Weld to work as a model to support the family. As the young actress told Life in 1971:

My father's family came from Tuxedo Park, and they offered to take us kids and pay for our education, on the condition that Mama never see us again. Mama was an orphan who had come here from London but so far as my father's family was concerned, she was strictly from the gutter. I have to give Mama credit—she refused to give us up... So I became the supporter of the family, and I had to take my father's place in many, many ways. I was expected to make up for everything that had ever gone wrong in Mama's life. She became obsessed with me, pouring out her pent-up love—her alleged love—on me, and it's been heavy on my shoulders ever since. Mama still thinks I owe everything to her.

Weld was a child model and her mother secured her an agent using her résumé from modeling. She made her acting debut on television at the age of 12, and her feature film debut that year in a bit role in the 1956 Alfred Hitchcock crime drama The Wrong Man.

In 1956, Weld played the lead in Rock, Rock, Rock, which featured record promoter Alan Freed and singers Chuck Berry, Frankie Lymon, and Johnny Burnette. In the film Connie Francis performed the vocals for Weld's singing parts.

On TV, she appeared in an episode of Goodyear Playhouse, "Backwoods Cinderella". She understudied on Broadway in The Dark at the Top of the Stairs.

Weld was cast in a supporting role in the Paul Newman–Joanne Woodward comedy Rally Round the Flag, Boys! (1958), made by 20th Century Fox. At Paramount Pictures, Weld was in The Five Pennies (1959), playing the daughter of Danny Kaye, who called Weld "15 going on 27". She guest-starred a number of times on The Adventures of Ozzie and Harriet (1958–59). She appeared in 77 Sunset Strip with Efrem Zimbalist Jr., in the 1959 episode "Secret Island".

=== 20th Century Fox ===
Weld's performance in Rally 'Round the Flag, Boys! impressed executives at Fox, who signed her to a long-term contract. They cast her in the CBS television series The Many Loves of Dobie Gillis, with a salary of $35,000 for one year. Weld played Thalia Menninger, the love interest of Dobie Gillis (played by Dwayne Hickman), whose rivals for Thalia's affection included Milton Armitage (played by Warren Beatty). Although Weld was a cast member for only one season, the show created considerable national publicity for her, and she was named a co-winner of a "Most Promising Newcomer" award at the Golden Globe Awards.

At Columbia, Weld had a leading role in the teen film Because They're Young (1960), starring Dick Clark. She was second billed in Sex Kittens Go to College (1960) made by Albert Zugsmith at Allied Artists. She made a second film for Zugsmith, The Private Lives of Adam and Eve, made in 1959 but not released for two years.

She guest starred on The Red Skelton Hour in "Appleby: The Big Producer" (1959) and on 77 Sunset Strip (1959) and The Millionaire (1960).

At Fox, she played Joy, a free-spirited university student in High Time, starring Bing Crosby and Fabian Forte. She sang a love song to Fabian in the season opener of NBC's The Dinah Shore Chevy Show on October 9, 1960. Four weeks later, on November 13, Weld returned to the network as a guest star in NBC's The Tab Hunter Show. She guested in "The Mormons" for Zane Grey Theatre (1960).

For Fox, Weld had a supporting role in the sequel Return to Peyton Place (1961), in the part played by Hope Lange in the original. Her portrayal of an incest victim was well received, but the film was less successful than its predecessor. She supported Elvis Presley in Wild in the Country (1962), along with Lange. Weld had an off-screen romance with Presley.

Fox also used her as a guest star on Follow the Sun ("The Highest Wall") and Adventures in Paradise ("The Velvet Trap"). On November 12, 1961, she played a singer, Cherie, in the seventh episode of ABC's television series Bus Stop, produced by Fox, with Marilyn Maxwell and Gary Lockwood. It was an adaptation of the play by William Inge, with Weld in the role originated on screen by Marilyn Monroe.

Weld supported Terry-Thomas in the Frank Tashlin comedy Bachelor Flat (1962), for Fox. Following the film's release, she appeared on What's My Line? as the celebrity mystery guest.

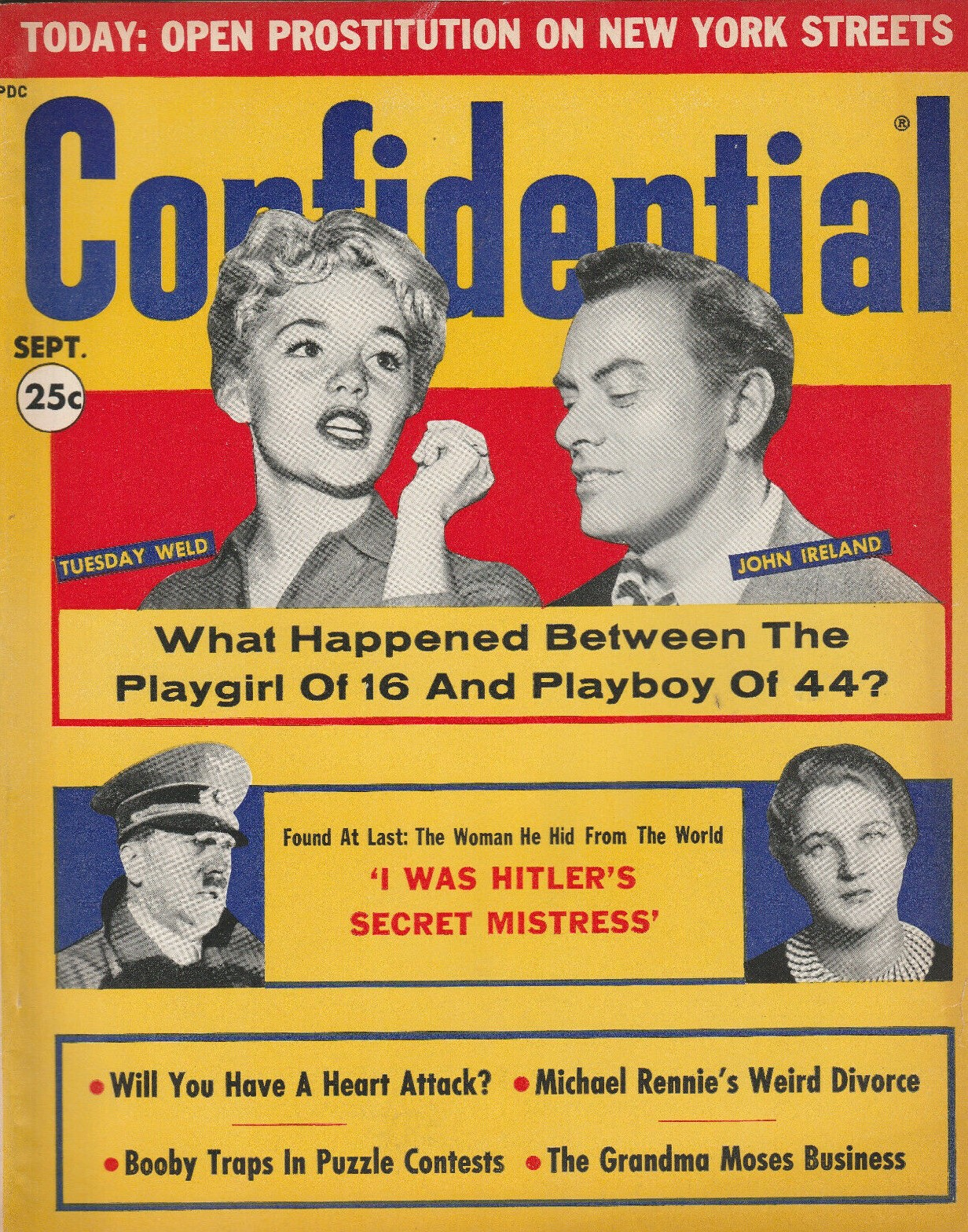
Gossip magazine (1960) with a story about Weld and John Ireland

Weld's mother was scandalized by her teen daughter's love affairs with older men, such as actor John Ireland, but Weld resisted, saying, "'If you don't leave me alone, I'll quit being an actress—which means there ain't gonna be no more money for you, Mama'. Finally, when I was sixteen, I left home. I just went out the door and bought my own house".

She was Stanley Kubrick's first choice to play the role of Lolita in his 1962 film, but she turned the offer down, saying: "I didn't have to play it. I was Lolita".

Weld took three months off to go to Greenwich Village in New York and "study myself". Then she starred along with Jackie Gleason and Steve McQueen in Soldier in the Rain, written by Blake Edwards from a novel by William Goldman, but the film was only a minor success.

She won excellent reviews for a February 7, 1962, episode in the Naked City, "A Case Study of Two Savages", adapted from the real-life case of backwood killers Charles Starkweather (played by Rip Torn) and Caril Ann Fugate, (depicted as the character Ora Mae Youngham, played by Weld), Starkweather's 14 year old girlfriend, on a homicidal spree ending in New York City. She guest starred on Route 66 in "Love Is a Skinny Kid" (1962), Ben Casey in "When You See an Evil Man" (1962), and The Dick Powell Theatre in "A Time to Die" (1962) and "Run Till It's Dark" with Fabian (1962).

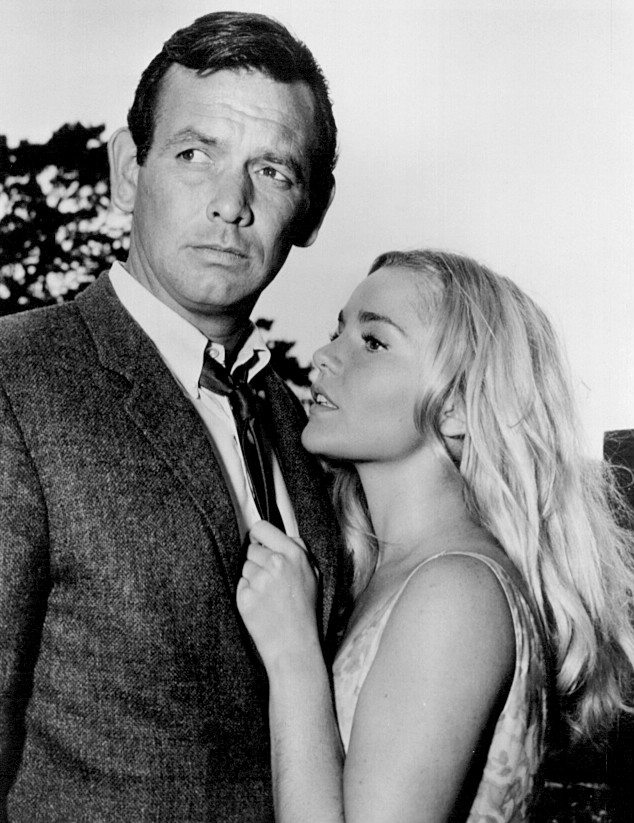
Weld in 1964, with David Janssen in the TV series The Fugitive.

In 1963, Weld guest starred as Denise Dunlear in The Eleventh Hour, in the episode "Something Crazy's Going on in the Back Room" alongside Angela Lansbury. She was in "The Legend of Lylah Clare" for The DuPont Show of the Week (1963), directed by Franklin J. Schaffner.

In 1964, she appeared in the title role of the episode "Keep an Eye on Emily" on Craig Stevens's CBS drama, Mr. Broadway. In the same year, she appeared as a troubled blind woman in "Dark Corner", an episode of The Fugitive.

She appeared with her former co-star Dwayne Hickman in Jack Palance's circus drama The Greatest Show on Earth on ABC, in separate episodes.

Weld supported Bob Hope in the comedy I'll Take Sweden (1965).

=== Stardom ===
Weld appeared in 1965 in the Norman Jewison film The Cincinnati Kid, opposite Steve McQueen. There was some controversy when she refused to meet the local governor at a fund-raiser for hurricane victims, jumping out of a car in view of 70,000 people. The film was a major commercial success.

Weld got a star role in Lord Love a Duck (1966), with Roddy McDowall, Ruth Gordon, and Harvey Korman. Weld received excellent reviews, but the film was a box office disappointment.

She followed it playing Abigail in a TV adaptation of The Crucible (1967), opposite George C. Scott and Colleen Dewhurst. After guest starring on Cimarron Strip (1967), Weld had the starring role in Pretty Poison (1968), co-starring Anthony Perkins. The film became a cult success, but she disliked the film and did not get on with director Noel Black.

Around this time, Weld became famous for turning down roles in films that succeeded at the box office, such as Bonnie and Clyde, Rosemary's Baby, True Grit, Cactus Flower, and Bob & Carol & Ted & Alice. In a 1971 interview with The New York Times, Weld explained that she had chosen to reject these roles precisely because she believed they would be commercial successes: "Do you think I want a success? I refused 'Bonnie and Clyde' because I was nursing at the time, but also because deep down I knew it was going to be a huge success. The same was true of 'Bob and Carol and Fred and Sue' or whatever it was called. It reeked of success".

The films Weld did make included I Walk the Line (1970), opposite Gregory Peck; A Safe Place (1971), co-starring Jack Nicholson and Orson Welles and directed by Henry Jaglom, and Play It as It Lays (1972), again with Perkins, for which she was nominated for a Golden Globe Award.

=== Peak years of success ===
Weld began to work again in television, starring in Reflections of Murder (1974) and F. Scott Fitzgerald in Hollywood (1975) in which she played Zelda Fitzgerald.

Weld attracted attention as the favored, out-of-control Katherine in Looking for Mr. Goodbar (1977)—packing into her short screen time an orgy, a divorce, a lot of alcohol, and two abortions—and was nominated for an Academy Award for Best Supporting Actress; later she appeared in Who'll Stop the Rain (1978) opposite Nick Nolte; and the ensemble satire Serial (1980).

She said she preferred television. "What I dig about TV is the pace", she said. "Two weeks for even a heavy part – great. Too much thinking about a role is a disaster for me. I mean, let's do it, let's get it done."

She played the lead in the TV films: A Question of Guilt (1978), in which she plays a woman accused of murdering her children; Mother and Daughter: The Loving War (1980), a remake of Madame X (1981); a new version of The Rainmaker (1982); and co-starred with Donald Sutherland in the TV film The Winter of Our Discontent (1983), for which she received an Emmy nomination.

In feature films, Weld had a supporting role in Michael Mann's 1981 film Thief, opposite James Caan. She played Al Pacino's wife in Author! Author! (1982), and had a supporting role in Heartbreak Hotel (1988).

In 1984, she appeared in Sergio Leone's gangster film Once Upon a Time in America, playing a jeweler's secretary who is in on a plan to steal a shipment of diamonds. During the robbery, her character goads Robert De Niro's character, David "Noodles" Aaronson, into "raping" her with her complicity. She later meets up with the gang from the robbery, and becomes the moll of James Woods' character Max Bercovicz. The performance earned Weld a BAFTA nomination for Best Supporting Actress of 1984.

On TV, Weld was in Scorned and Swindled (1984), Circle of Violence (1986) and Something in Common (1986).

=== Later career ===
Weld was reunited with Anthony Perkins in an episode of Mistress of Suspense (1990).

In 1993, she played a police officer's neurotic wife in Falling Down, starring Michael Douglas and Robert Duvall. She had small supporting roles in Feeling Minnesota (1996), Investigating Sex (2001), and Chelsea Walls (2001).

== Personal life ==
Weld has been married three times. She was married to screenwriter Claude Harz from October 23, 1965, until their divorce on February 18, 1971. They had a daughter. Weld was awarded custody of their daughter in the divorce and $100 a month in child support payments.

Weld married British actor, musician and comedian Dudley Moore on September 20, 1975. On February 26, 1976, they had a son. The couple divorced in 1980, with Weld receiving a $200,000 settlement plus $3,000 monthly alimony for the next four years and an additional $2,500 a month in child support.

On October 18, 1985, she married Israeli concert violinist and conductor Pinchas Zukerman, becoming stepmother to his daughters Arianna Zukerman and Natalia Zukerman. The couple divorced in 2001. In court papers, Pinchas Zukerman quoted Weld as saying, "Why do I need to go to another concert when I've heard the piece before?" and "I can't stand the backstage scene. I don't want to hear another note."

Between marriages, Weld dated Al Pacino, David Steinberg, Mikhail Baryshnikov (whose previous girlfriend, Jessica Lange, had been Weld's best friend), Omar Sharif, Richard Gere and Ryan O'Neal.

Weld sold her beach house in Montauk, New York in the late 2000s and moved to Carbondale, Colorado. In 2018, she left Colorado and bought a $1.8 million home in the Hollywood Hills.

=== Montauk house ===
Weld and husband Zukerman purchased 74 Surfside Avenue in 1990 from the estate of Norman Kean, who produced the long-running Broadway show Oh! Calcutta! and who killed himself after murdering his actress wife Gwyda Donhowe in their Manhattan apartment in 1988. Although the Montauk residence was not a crime scene, Weld later struggled to find a buyer for the property due to its murder-suicide connection. Listed for $9.9 million in 2006, it sat on the market for three years before selling at a reduced price of $6.75 million in 2009 and is now rented. Weld bought a condo in the area in 2021, which she sold in 2025 at a modest profit.

== In popular culture ==
The cover of Matthew Sweet's 1991 album Girlfriend features a photo of Weld. Originally called Nothing Lasts, the album was retitled after Weld objected. Weld is mentioned in the Donald Fagen song "New Frontier" on his album The Nightfly. Sweet's greatest hits compilation Time Capsule features photos of Weld on the front and back covers. British band The Real Tuesday Weld is named after a dream the vocalist had which involved the actress. Weld is also mentioned in Tiny Tim's version of "Then I'd Be Satisfied With Life" on the album God Bless Tiny Tim.

== Filmography ==
=== Film ===
Year	Film	Role	Notes
1956	Rock, Rock, Rock	Dori Graham	
1958	Rally 'Round the Flag, Boys!	Comfort Goodpasture	
1959	The Five Pennies	Dorothy Nichols, age 12 to 14	
1960	Because They're Young	Anne Gregor	
1960	Sex Kittens Go to College	Jody	
1960	High Time	Joy Elder	
1960	The Private Lives of Adam and Eve	Vangie Harper	
1961	Return to Peyton Place	Selena Cross	
1961	Wild in the Country	Noreen Braxton	
1962	Bachelor Flat	Libby Bushmill/Libby Smith	
1963	Soldier in the Rain	Bobby Jo Pepperdine	
1965	I'll Take Sweden	JoJo Holcomb	
1965	The Cincinnati Kid	Christian Rudd	
1966	Lord Love a Duck	Barbara Ann Greene	
1968	Pretty Poison	Sue Ann Stepanek	
1970	I Walk the Line	Alma McCain	
1971	A Safe Place	Susan/Noah	
1972	Play It as It Lays	Maria Wyeth Lang	Nominated — Golden Globe Award for Best Actress – Motion Picture Drama
1977	Looking for Mr. Goodbar	Katherine Dunn	Nominated — Academy Award for Best Supporting Actress
1978	Who'll Stop the Rain	Marge Converse	
1980	Serial	Kate Linville Holroyd	
1981	Thief	Jessie	
1982	Author! Author!	Gloria Travalian	
1984	Once Upon a Time in America	Carol	Nominated — BAFTA Award for Best Actress in a Supporting Role
1988	Heartbreak Hotel	Marie Wolfe	
1993	Falling Down	Amanda Prendergast	
1996	Feeling Minnesota	Nora Clayton	
2001	Investigating Sex	Sasha Faldo	
2001	Chelsea Walls	Greta	

=== Television ===
Year	Film	Role	Notes
1959	The Adventures of Ozzie and Harriet	Connie/Cathy	3 episodes
1959	The Red Skelton Hour	Starlet	Episode: "Appleby: The Big Producer"
1959	77 Sunset Strip	Barrie Connell	Episode: "Secret Island"
1959–62	The Many Loves of Dobie Gillis	Thalia Menninger	Series regular (season 1); Guest star (seasons 3–4)
1960	77 Sunset Strip	Kitten Lang	Episode: "Condor's Lair"
1960	The Millionaire	Beth Boland	Episode: "Millionaire Katherine Boland"
1960	The Tab Hunter Show	Ginny	Episode: "The Doll in the Bathtub"
1960	Dick Powell's Zane Grey Theatre	Beth Lawson	Episode: "The Mormons"
1961	Follow the Sun	Barbara Beaumont	Episode: "The Highest Wall"
1961	Bus Stop	Cherie	Episode: "Cherie"
1962	What's My Line?	Herself (Mystery Guest)	Episode: January 14, 1962
1962	Adventures in Paradise	Gloria Dannora	Episode: "The Velvet Trap"
1962	Naked City	Ora Mae Youngham	Episode: "A Case Study of Two Savages"
1962	Route 66	Miriam Moore	Episode: "Love Is a Skinny Kid"
1962	Ben Casey	Melanie Gardner	Episode: "When You See an Evil Man"
1964	Mr. Broadway	Emily	Episode: "An Eye on Emily"
1964	The Fugitive	Mattie Braydon	Episode: "Dark Corner"
1967	The Crucible	Abigail Williams	Television film
1968	Cimarron Strip	Heller	Episode: "Heller"
1974	Reflections of Murder	Vicky	Television film
1975	F. Scott Fitzgerald in Hollywood	Zelda Fitzgerald	Television film
1978	A Question of Guilt	Doris Winters	Television film
1980	Mother and Daughter: The Loving War	Lillie Lloyd McCann	Television film
1981	Madame X	Holly Richardson	Television film
1982	The Rainmaker	Lizzie Curry	Television film CableACE Award for Actress in a Theatrical or Non-Musical Program
1983	The Winter of our Discontent	Margie Young-Hunt	Television film Nominated — Emmy Award for Outstanding Supporting Actress – Miniseries or a Movie
1984	Scorned and Swindled	Sharon Clark	Television film
1986	Circle of Violence	Georgia Benfield	Television film
1986	Something in Common	Shelly Grant	Television film
1990	Chillers	Jessica	Episode: "Something You Have to Live With"
