= Run Till It's Dark =

- The Dick Powell Show episode
- Episode no.: Season 2 Episode 3
- Directed by: Robert Ellis Miller
- Written by: Turnley Walker
- Original air date: 9 October 1962

Guest appearances
- Fabian as Jake Cob; Tuesday Weld as Stacy Palmer; Bert Freed as Henderson; Paul Newlan as truck driver; Larry Blake as pit boss

"Run Till It's Dark" is an episode of The Dick Powell Show. It starred Tuesday Weld and Fabian.

== Plot ==
A young woman, Stacy, is on the run from a mystery man, Henderson. She sells her car and hitches a ride to Las Vegas where she meets Jake, a farm kid fleeing a broken engagement, at a roulette table. Jake agrees to drive her to San Francisco.

Jake falls in love with Stacy. Henderson keeps after her.

Eventually Stacy takes Jake's car and crashes it, killing herself.

== Production ==
Filming started 29 March. Fabian was cast on the strength of his performance in "A Lion Walks Among Us" on Bus Stop.

== Reception ==
Hal Humphrey of the Los Angeles Times called it the worst drama in an anthology series for 1962. "To this day, no one has figured out what the drama was about."
