= Once Upon a Time in America =

1984 film directed by Sergio Leone

- Theatrical release poster by Tom Jung
- Directed by: Sergio Leone
- Screenplay by: Leonardo Benvenuti; Piero De Bernardi; Enrico Medioli; Franco Arcalli; Franco Ferrini; Sergio Leone
- Dialogue by: Stuart Kaminsky
- Based on: The Hoods; 1952 novel by Harry Grey
- Produced by: Arnon Milchan
- Starring: Robert De Niro; James Woods; Elizabeth McGovern; Joe Pesci; Burt Young; Tuesday Weld; Treat Williams
- Cinematography: Tonino Delli Colli
- Edited by: Nino Baragli
- Music by: Ennio Morricone
- Production companies: The Ladd Company; PSO International; Embassy International Pictures; Rafran Cinematografica
- Distributed by: Warner Bros. (US); Titanus (Italy)
- Release dates: May 23, 1984 (Cannes); June 1, 1984 (US); September 28, 1984 (Italy)
- Running time: 229 minutes
- Countries: Italy; United States
- Languages: English; Italian
- Budget: $30 million
- Box office: $5.5 million

Once Upon a Time in America (Italian: C'era una volta in America) is a 1984 epic crime film based on Harry Grey's semi-autobiographical 1952 novel The Hoods. Directed by Sergio Leone from a screenplay he co-wrote with Leonardo Benvenuti, Piero De Bernardi, Enrico Medioli, Franco Arcalli and Franco Ferrini, the film stars Robert De Niro, James Woods, Elizabeth McGovern, Joe Pesci, Burt Young, Tuesday Weld and Treat Williams. The film is an Italian–American venture produced by The Ladd Company, Embassy International Pictures, PSO Enterprises and Rafran Cinematografica, and distributed by Warner Bros. It chronicles the lives of best friends David "Noodles" Aaronson and Maximilian "Max" Bercovicz as they lead a group of Jewish ghetto youths who rise to prominence as Jewish gangsters in New York City's world of organized crime. The film explores themes of childhood friendships, love, lust, greed, betrayal, loss and broken relationships, together with the rise of mobsters in American society.

It is the final film in the 'once upon a time' trilogy and also the last film directed by Leone before his death five years later, and the first feature film that he had directed in 13 years. It is the third installment of Leone's Once Upon a Time Trilogy, which includes Once Upon a Time in the West (1968) and Duck, You Sucker! (1971). The cinematography is by Tonino Delli Colli, and the film score by Ennio Morricone. Leone originally envisaged two three-hour films, then a single 269-minute (4 hours and 29 minutes) version, but was convinced by distributors to shorten it to 229 minutes (3 hours and 49 minutes). The American distributors, The Ladd Company, further shortened it to 139 minutes (2 hours and 19 minutes), and rearranged the scenes into chronological order, without Leone's involvement.

The U.S. edit was a critical and commercial flop in the United States, and critics who had seen both versions harshly condemned the changes made. While sometimes considered one of Leone's most overlooked films, the original European cut of Once Upon a Time in America has remained a critical favorite and frequently appears in lists of the greatest films of all time, especially in the gangster genre.

== Plot ==
In the 1930s, three thugs search for a man named "Noodles". Noodles is drugging himself in an opium den with a newspaper next to him featuring the deaths of bootleggers Patrick Goldberg, Philip Stein and Maximilian Bercovicz. He recalls the police removing their corpses, one burnt beyond recognition. Noodles evades capture and leaves the city.

In 1918, David "Noodles" Aaronson leads a gang of his three friends—"Patsy" Goldberg, "Cockeye" Stein and Dominic—performing jobs for local gangster Bugsy. They meet Max as he foils one of their robberies but has the watch stolen from him by corrupt police officer Whitey. Max joins their gang, and they blackmail Whitey to get the same police protection as Bugsy.

The gang becomes successful liquor smugglers. They deposit their earnings in a locker, giving the key to a trusted friend, Moe. Noodles is in love with Moe's sister Deborah, who dreams of becoming a dancer. Due to his socialization as a gangster, Deborah sees no future for their love. Bugsy, now a rival, ambushes the gang and fatally shoots Dominic. Noodles kills Bugsy and is sentenced to prison.

When he is released a decade later, Noodles rejoins his gang. During a diamond heist, they use jewelry employee Carol as their informant. She goads Noodles into hitting her to make it "look real", after which he rapes her; she soon becomes Max's girlfriend. Noodles realizes that the heist was commissioned by a syndicate figure to eliminate competition. This leads to tensions between Max and Noodles, the latter seeking independence. The gang provides protection for Teamsters' union boss O'Donnell, during the course of which they exchange newborns at a clinic, punishing the head of police, whose wife has just given birth to a boy at that clinic. This results in the police withdrawing their actions against striking workers.

Noodles takes Deborah on a lavish date. When she reveals her plans to pursue a career in Hollywood, he snaps and rapes her. As she departs the next day, he attempts to catch a glance of her sitting on the train, but she avoids eye contact.

The repeal of Prohibition forces the gang to look for alternative activities. Max suggests a New York Federal Reserve Bank heist, which Noodles and Carol deem too risky. Carol convinces Noodles to inform the police about a lesser offense, hoping brief incarceration will cool off Max's ambition. After Noodles calls the police, Max knocks him out. On regaining consciousness, Noodles learns that Max, Patsy and Cockeye have been killed by the police during the heist, as established at the beginning of the film. A guilt-ridden Noodles hides in the opium den. During his subsequent escape, he realizes that the locker money has disappeared.

In the 1960s, after receiving a letter indicating that his identity has been uncovered, Noodles returns to Manhattan for the first time since the 1930s, seeking to find who is responsible. He learns that the bodies of his three friends have been relocated to Riverdale. He visits their mausoleum in Riverdale and finds a key to a railway locker.

The locker reveals a suitcase full of money, stated to be the advance on his next job. Noodles learns of the corruption scandals around U.S. Secretary of Commerce Christopher Bailey and visits Carol in a retirement home run by the Bailey Foundation. She tells him that Max manipulated them into tipping him off to the police and that Max opened fire first, wishing to die young.

In a memorial photograph, Noodles spots Deborah, who has become a major actress, and he starts to suspect a connection between Deborah and Bailey. He tracks down Deborah and visits her, telling her about his invitation to a party at Bailey's mansion, and challenging her to tell him about the mysterious job, as well as the identity of Bailey. Deborah admits to being Bailey's lover and begs Noodles to leave the city before facing hurtful revelations. Ignoring her advice, Noodles leaves her after seeing Bailey's son, who resembles Max when he was younger.

Noodles meets Bailey, who turns out to be Max. Noodles learns that Max faked his death, stole the gang's money, and reinvented himself as a self-made businessman. He also made Deborah his mistress, thus robbing Noodles of everything that he had. Faced with ruin due to the corruption scandal, Max reveals that he is behind the mysterious job, which is for Noodles to kill him. Noodles refuses. As Noodles leaves the estate, a garbage truck passes, and a man who appears to be Max walks toward Noodles until the truck passes between them. Noodles sees the truck's auger conveyor grinding garbage, but the man is nowhere to be seen.

In the 1930s, Noodles comes back to the opium den. He smokes a pipe and smiles.

== Cast ==
- Robert De Niro as David "Noodles" Aaronson
  - Scott Tiler as young Noodles
- James Woods as Maximilian "Max" Bercovicz
  - Rusty Jacobs as young Max and David Bailey
- Elizabeth McGovern as Deborah Gelly
  - Jennifer Connelly as young Deborah
- Joe Pesci as Frankie Minaldi
- Burt Young as Joe Minaldi
- Tuesday Weld as Carol
- Treat Williams as Jimmy Conway O'Donnell
- Danny Aiello as Police Chief Vincent Aiello
- Richard Bright as "Chicken Joe"
- James Hayden as Patrick "Patsy" Goldberg
  - Brian Bloom as young "Patsy"
- William Forsythe as Philip "Cockeye" Stein
  - Adrian Curran as young "Cockeye"
- Darlanne Fluegel as Eve
- Larry Rapp as Morris "Fat Moe" Gelly
  - Mike Monetti as young "Fat Moe"
- Richard Foronjy as Officer "Fartface" Whitey
- Robert Harper as Sharkey
- Dutch Miller as Van Linden
- Gerard Murphy as Crowning
- Amy Ryder as Peggy
  - Julie Cohen as young Peggy
- Estelle Harris as Peggy's Mother

The cast also includes Noah Moazezi as Dominic, James Russo as "Bugsy", producer Arnon Milchan as Noodles's chauffeur, Marcia Jean Kurtz as Max's mother, Joey Faye as an "Adorable Old Man", Paul Herman as "Monkey", and Olga Karlatos as a puppet theatre patron.

Frank Gio, Ray Dittrich and Mario Brega (a Leone regular who had appeared in the Dollars Trilogy), respectively, appear as "Beefy", "Trigger" and "Mandy", a trio of gangsters who search for Noodles. Frequent De Niro collaborator Chuck Low and Leone's daughter Francesca make uncredited appearances as Fat Moe's and Deborah's father, and as David Bailey's girlfriend, respectively. In the 2012 restoration, Louise Fletcher appears as the Director of Riverdale Cemetery, where Noodles visits his friends' tomb in 1968.

== Production ==
=== Development ===
During the mid-1960s, Sergio Leone had read the novel The Hoods by Harry Grey, a pseudonym for the former gangster-turned-informant whose real name was Harry Goldberg. In 1968, after shooting Once Upon a Time in the West, Leone made many efforts to talk to Grey. Having enjoyed Leone's Dollars Trilogy, Grey finally responded and agreed to meet with Leone at a Manhattan bar. Following that initial meeting, Leone met with Grey several times throughout the remainder of the 1960s and 1970s, having discussions with him to understand America through Grey's point of view.

Intent on making another trilogy about America consisting of Once Upon a Time in the West, Duck, You Sucker! and Once Upon a Time in America, Leone turned down an offer from Paramount Pictures to direct The Godfather to pursue his pet project.

At some point, Leone considered other colleagues including Miloš Forman and John Milius for the role of director, with Leone serving merely as producer. For some time, the project was linked to French producers André Génovès and Gérard Lebovici, and later to Gaumont, with Gérard Depardieu and Jean Gabin slated to be the main actors.

Acquiring the rights to the novel proved to be complicated, as they had been bought by Dan Curtis, who intended to shoot the film and refused various offers by Leone and his backers to sell the rights. Curtis eventually transferred the rights to Alberto Grimaldi in exchange for Grimaldi's production of his $2 million film Burnt Offerings.

Initially, only a draft for the film's opening scene was made, penned by Ernesto Gastaldi and developed by Robert Dillon, which Dillon eventually used in John Frankenheimer's film 99 and 44/100% Dead, much to Leone's dismay.

After Grimaldi bought the rights, he felt that he needed an American scriptwriter to faithfully capture the spirit of the novel; he eventually made a deal with Norman Mailer, whose draft greatly disappointed both Grimaldi and Leone, who described Mailer's draft as "a Mickey Mouse version [of the novel]" that lacked in structure and "made no sense at all". A few elements of Norman Mailer's first two drafts would eventually appear in the film.

After Mailer's fiasco, Leone opted for an all-Italian team of scriptwriters: Leonardo Benvenuti and Piero De Bernardi would focus on the 1920s section, Enrico Medioli on the 1930s section, and Franco "Kim" Arcalli on the time shifts, with Leone supervising and Franco Ferrini polishing the script.

As of 1975–1976, Leone's casting ideas still included Depardieu and Gabin, as well as Richard Dreyfuss as Max, James Cagney, Robert Charlebois, and appearances by Henry Fonda, James Stewart, George Raft and Glenn Ford.

In 1976, Ennio Morricone had already composed all the main themes for the film. Meanwhile, relations between Grimaldi and Leone soured, with Grimaldi unconvinced of the film's commercial viability and eventually exiting the project, being replaced in 1980 by Arnon Milchan.

At this stage, Leone's casting ideas included Tom Berenger, Dustin Hoffman, Paul Newman and Liza Minnelli. A 317-page shooting script was completed in late 1981. The final script, translated to English by Stuart M. Kaminsky, was approved by Leone in May 1982.

=== Casting ===
In 1981, at Milchan's suggestion, Leone met Robert De Niro and eventually offered him the role of his choice between Noodles and Max. De Niro's commitment turned out to be crucial for Milchan's securing the financial backing for the film.

For the role of Max, approximately 200 actors were auditioned. Elizabeth McGovern was chosen for the role of Deborah despite De Niro's request for having a New York native with a Brooklyn accent, due to Leone's appreciation of her performance in Ragtime.

Joe Pesci was chosen by Arnon Milchan because of his role in Raging Bull, and was offered a supporting role of his choice. At De Niro's recommendation, Tuesday Weld was cast as Carol, a role that Leone had previously envisioned for Claudia Cardinale.

For the children's roles, Leone entrusted the task to Cis Corman, asking her not to have child stars, but instead having actors who had lived in New York's Jewish neighborhood and had no previous acting experience. In the end, Corman provided mostly actors without film credits but with experiences on stage and television.

=== Filming ===
The filming of Once Upon a Time in America started in June 1982 and ended in April the following year. The shooting locations took place in and around the US, Canada, Italy and France, with a focal point in New York City. Interior scenes were filmed mostly at the Cinecittà Studios in Rome.

The beach scene in which Max unveils his plan to rob the Federal Reserve, was shot at The Don CeSar in St. Pete Beach, Florida. The railway of New York's Grand Central Terminal in 1930s flashbacks was filmed in the Gare du Nord in Paris. The interiors of the lavish restaurant where Noodles takes Deborah on their date were shot in the Hotel Excelsior in Venice, Italy.

Several sequences were filmed in Montreal, Quebec - the exterior of Bordeaux Prison doubled for the Federal Reserve Bank of New York, the shooting of Jimmy O'Donnell was filmed at Place d'Youville, a scene were Noodles picks up Deborah was shot outside the Ritz-Carlton Montreal. The meeting and shootout with the Minaldi brothers was filmed in the town of Louiseville.

Filming in New York proved to be relatively difficult, as the IATSE labor union raised a strong objection to Leone's use of a foreign crew, and launched a public protest campaign big enough to persuade President Ronald Reagan to call for a Department of Labor investigation into the matter.

De Niro shot his scenes in chronological continuity. His makeup as an old man required four-to-six hours of preparation. After a few weeks, Nilo Jacoponi, Manlio Rocchetti and Gino Zamprioli replaced Christopher Tucker, whose makeup was considered excessive and unrealistic by Leone.

=== Editing ===
By the end of filming, Leone had ten hours of footage. With his editor Nino Baragli, Leone trimmed it to almost six hours, and he originally wanted to release the film in two parts. The producers refused and Leone was forced to shorten it further.

The film was originally 269 minutes (4 hours and 29 minutes), but when it premiered out of competition at the 1984 Cannes Film Festival, Leone had cut it to 229 minutes (3 hours and 49 minutes) to appease the distributors. The latter is the version shown in European cinemas.

=== Music ===
The musical score was composed by Leone's longtime collaborator Ennio Morricone. "Deborah's Theme" was written for a Franco Zeffirelli film but was rejected. The score is also notable for Morricone's incorporation of the music of Gheorghe Zamfir, who plays a pan flute. Zamfir's flute music was used to similar effect in Peter Weir's Picnic at Hanging Rock (1975). Morricone also collaborated with vocalist Edda Dell'Orso on the score.

Once Upon a Time in America

Soundtrack album by Ennio Morricone
- Released: June 1, 1984; October 17, 1995 (Special edition)
- Recorded: December 1983
- Studios: Forum Studios, Rome
- Genre: Contemporary classical
- Label: Mercury Records
- Producer: Ennio Morricone

Special Edition cover

Besides the original music, the film used source music, including:

- "God Bless America" (written by Irving Berlin, performed by Kate Smith – 1943) – Plays over the opening credits from a radio in Eve's bedroom and briefly at the film's ending.
- "Yesterday" (written by Lennon–McCartney – 1965) – A Muzak version of this piece plays when Noodles first returns to New York in 1968, examining himself in a train-station mirror. An instrumental version of the song also plays briefly during the dialogue between Noodles and "Bailey" near the film's end.
- "Summertime" (written by George Gershwin – 1935) An instrumental version of the aria from the opera Porgy and Bess is playing softly in the background as Noodles, prior to leaving, explains to "Secretary Bailey" why he could never kill his friend.
- "Amapola" (written by Joseph Lacalle, American lyrics by Albert Gamse – 1923) – Originally an opera piece, several instrumental versions of this song are played during the film; a jazzy version, which plays on the gramophone danced to by young Deborah in 1918; a similar version performed by Fat Moe's jazz band in the 1930s speakeasy; and a string version, during Noodles's date with Deborah. Both versions are available on the soundtrack.
- Part of the third theme from the overture to La gazza ladra (Gioachino Rossini – 1817) – Used during the baby-switching scene in the hospital.
- "Night and Day" (written and sung by Cole Porter – 1932) – Played by a jazz band during the beach scene before the beachgoers receive word of Prohibition's repeal, and during the party at the house of "Secretary Bailey" in 1968.
- "St. James Infirmary Blues" is used during the Prohibition "funeral" at the gang's speakeasy.

A soundtrack album was released in 1984 by Mercury Records. It was followed by a special-edition release in 1995 featuring four additional tracks.

Side one
No.	Title	Length
1.	"Once Upon a Time in America"	2:11
2.	"Poverty"	3:37
3.	"Deborah's Theme"	4:24
4.	"Childhood Memories"	3:22
5.	"Amapola"	5:21
6.	"Friends"	1:34
7.	"Prohibition Dirge"	4:20

Side two
No.	Title	Length
8.	"Cockeye's Song"	4:20
9.	"Amapola, Part II"	3:07
10.	"Childhood Poverty"	1:41
11.	"Photographic Memories"	1:00
12.	"Friends – Reprise"	1:23
13.	"Friendship & Love"	4:14
14.	"Speakeasy"	2:21
15.	"Deborah's Theme – Amapola"	6:13

Bonus tracks (1995 Special Edition)
No.	Title	Length
16.	"Suite from Once Upon a Time in America (Includes Amapola)"	13:32
17.	"Poverty (Temp. Version)"	3:26
18.	"Unused Theme"	4:46
19.	"Unused Theme (Version 2)"	3:38

== Interpretations ==
As the film begins and ends in 1933, with Noodles hiding in an opium den from syndicate hitmen, and the last shot of the film is of Noodles in a smiling, opium-soaked high, the film can be interpreted as having been a drug-induced dream, with Noodles remembering his past and envisioning the future. In an interview by Noël Simsolo published in 1987, Leone lent support to this interpretation, saying that the scenes set in the 1960s could be seen as an opium dream of Noodles's. In the DVD commentary for the film, film historian and critic Richard Schickel states that opium users often report vivid dreams, and that these visions have a tendency to explore the user's past and future.

The ending, in which Max is seen by Noodles outside Bailey's mansion, only to disappear behind a truck as it passes, was reportedly left ambiguous on purpose. James Woods, who played Max, stated that he does not know if Max jumped in the truck or just disappeared. Critic Carlo Affatigato described this twist as a "paradox", postulating that the whole film is about how Noodles spends the second half of his life seeking out the truth of what happened, only to discover it, not accept it, and not investigate what happens to Max in the end. Noodles wants only to believe the reality that he has created for himself, not an objective one. Affatigato also believes that this could point to it all being the imagination of Noodles.

Many people (including Schickel) assume that the 1968 Frisbee scene, which has an immediate cut and gives no further resolution, was part of a longer sequence. Critic Roger Ebert of the Chicago Sun-Times suggested that the purpose of the flying disc scene was to establish the 1960s time frame and nothing more.

=== Commentary on the American Dream ===
In a review for The Guardian to commemorate the film's fortieth anniversary, Scott Tobias notes how the film's narrative, chronicling the saga of Noodles and Max from the 1920s to the '30s and finally the '60s 'reflects the rotten, corruptible soul of the country itself over the same period'. According to Tobias, their relationship and the 'astonishing betrayal and tragedy' it leaves in its wake also comments on the moral decline of America, 'a country tarnished by such unclean hands'. The film's authority figures are all corrupt, from thieving Officer 'Fartface' Whitey to dirty politician Sharkey and Max's alter ego, the scandalised Secretary of Commerce, Christopher Bailey. These characters make Noodles appear merely a 'small, impulsive man in a country that becomes overrun by them' over the course of the film and his life.

Tobias notes how even principled union boss Jimmy O'Donnell is corrupted, being coerced into a transactional relationship with Max and Noodles's gang. First shown vehemently refusing to stand down the Teamsters' union strike despite the immediate threat of execution by burning at the hands of 'Chicken Joe', a rival gangster, O'Donnell later becomes little more than a puppet, grudgingly accommodating the central characters muscling control over his union. This links to the film's tragic point that 'decency can always be chipped away', as shown by the dirtying of American institutions and organisations through criminal involvement.

== Release ==
Once Upon a Time in America premiered at the 1984 Cannes Film Festival on May 20, 1984. It received a 15-minute standing ovation after the screening.

In the United States, a heavily edited version of the film received a wide release in 894 theaters on June 1, 1984, and grossed $2.4 million during its opening weekend. It ended its box-office run with a gross of more than $5.3 million on a $30 million budget, and became a box-office bomb.

Numerous women at the film's premiere reacted furiously, mostly due to the two rape sequences. One woman confronted Robert De Niro at a press conference and made harsh comments to the film's depiction, describing it as "blatant, gratuitous violence". In general, the rape scenes specifically were controversial. Richard Godden defended Leone's representation of rape, saying that it "articulates the dysfunction between bodies in images and bodies themselves". Of the scene in which De Niro's character rapes her character, Elizabeth McGovern said that it "didn't glamorize violent sex: it is extremely uncomfortable to watch and it is meant to be". She went on to state:

And if you say, "this violence is wrong", you'd have to enlarge that to say, "all violence in movies in wrong", and then you'd have to say, "you can only make movies about good people who obey the law and do right things" which a) excludes a lot of what life is and b) makes for some very boring movies.

In his book, Leone scholar Christopher Frayling argues that the movie's central gang are all emotionally stunted "like small boys obsessed with their equipment who have no idea how to relate to flesh-and-blood women".

=== Versions ===
==== US version ====
The film was shown in limited release and for film critics in North America, where it was slightly trimmed to secure an "R" rating. Cuts were made to two rape scenes and some of the more graphic violence at the beginning. Noodles's meeting with Bailey in 1968 was also excised.

The film gained a mediocre reception at several sneak premieres in North America. Because of this early audience reaction, the fear of its length, its graphic violence, and the inability of theaters to have multiple showings in one day, The Ladd Company cut entire scenes and removed approximately 90 minutes of the film without the supervision of Sergio Leone.

This American wide release (1984, 139 minutes) was drastically different from the European release, as the non-chronological story was rearranged into chronological order. Other major cuts involved many of the childhood sequences, making the adult 1933 sections more prominent. Noodles's 1968 meeting with Deborah was excised, and the scene with Bailey ends with him shooting himself (with the sound of a gunshot off-screen) rather than with the garbage truck conclusion of the 229-minute version. Sergio Leone's daughter Raffaella Leone said that Sergio had dismissed the US version as not his own movie.

==== USSR ====
In the Soviet Union, the film was shown theatrically in the late 1980s, with other Hollywood blockbusters, such as the two King Kong films. The story was rearranged in chronological order, and the film was split in two, with the two parts shown as separate movies, one containing the childhood scenes and the other comprising the adulthood scenes. Despite the rearranging, no major scene deletions were made.

==== Restored original ====
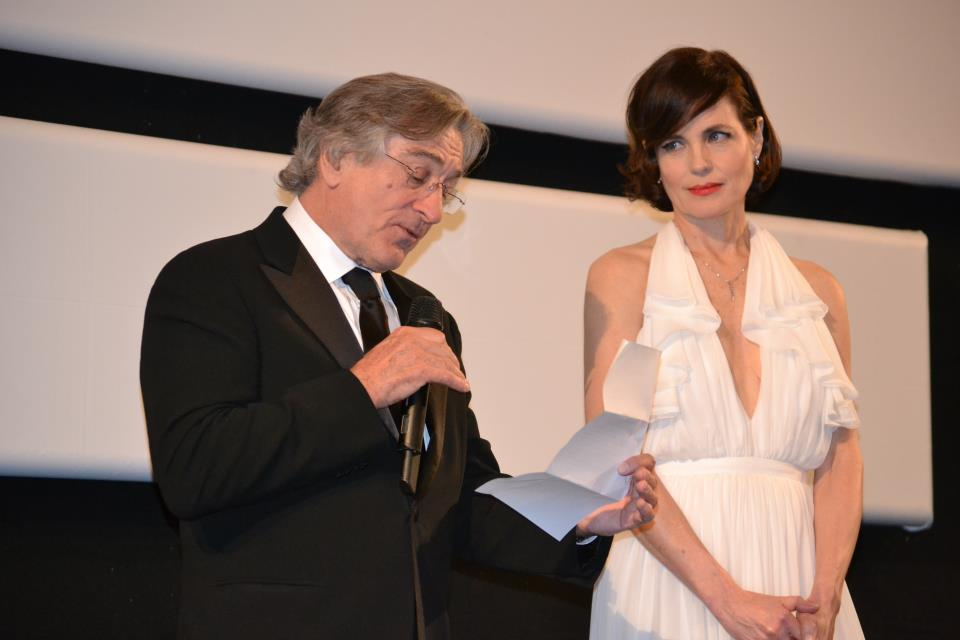
Robert De Niro and Elizabeth McGovern at the screening of the film's restored version, during the 2012 Cannes Film Festival

In March 2011, it was announced that Leone's original 269-minute version was to be recreated by a film laboratory in Italy under the supervision of Leone's children, who had acquired the Italian distribution rights, and the film's original sound editor, Fausto Ancillai, for a premiere in 2012 at either the Cannes Film Festival or Venice Film Festival.

The restored film premiered at the 2012 Cannes Film Festival, but because of unforeseen rights issues for the deleted scenes, the restoration had a run-time of only 251 minutes. However, Martin Scorsese (whose Film Foundation helped with the restoration) stated that he was helping Leone's children gain the rights to the final 18 minutes of deleted scenes to create a complete restoration of Leone's envisaged 269-minute version. On August 3, 2012, it was reported that after the premiere at Cannes, the restored film was pulled from circulation, pending further restoration work.

==== Home media ====
In North America, a two-tape VHS was released by Warner Home Video in February 1985 and 1991 with a run-time of 226 minutes. The U.S. theatrical cut was also released at the same time in February 1985.

A two-disc special edition was released on June 10, 2003, featuring the 229-minute version of the film. This special edition was re-released on January 11, 2011, on both DVD and Blu-ray. On September 30, 2014, Warner Bros. released a two-disc Blu-ray and DVD set of the 251-minute restoration that was shown at the 2012 Cannes Film Festival, dubbed the Extended Director's Cut. This version was previously released in Italy on September 4, 2012.

== Box office ==
During its domestic theatrical run, it managed to gross $5.5M combining both the US and Canadian markets. In Europe, the 229-minute-long version had a relatively better performance, but still didn't manage to recoup the money invested. It sold 1,165,208 admissions in France, becoming the 34th most seen film of the year 1984. In Spain, where it was released as a two-parter, the film sold 596,074 admissions (373,722 and 222,352, respectively, for Part I and Part II) during its initial theatrical run; it was re-released several times for the remainder of the decade, and ended grossing 182 million pesetas (which converted to $1.3M).

== Critical reception ==
The initial critical response to Once Upon a Time in America was mixed, primarily because of the different versions released worldwide. Although the film was well received in its original form internationally, American critics were much more dissatisfied with the 139-minute version that was released in North America. The condensed version was a critical and financial disaster,.

Some critics compared shortening the film to shortening Richard Wagner's operas, saying that works of art that are meant to be long should be given the respect they deserve. In his 1984 review, Roger Ebert gave the uncut version four stars out of four and wrote that it was "an epic poem of violence and greed", but described the American theatrical version as a "travesty". Furthermore, he gave the American theatrical version one star out of four, calling it "an incomprehensible mess without texture, timing, mood, or sense".

Ebert's television film-critic partner Gene Siskel of the Chicago Tribune considered the uncut version to be the best film of 1984 and the shortened, linear studio version to be the worst film of 1984.

Vincent Canby of The New York Times criticized the nonlinear narrative that is structured throughout the film.

It was only after Leone's death and the subsequent restoration of the original version that critics began to give it the kind of praise displayed at its original Cannes showing. Ebert, in his review of Brian De Palma's The Untouchables, called the original uncut version of Once Upon a Time in America the best film depicting the Prohibition era. James Woods, who considers it to be Leone's finest film, mentioned in the DVD documentary that one critic dubbed the film the worst of 1984, only to see the original cut years later and call it the best of the 1980s. Some were critical towards the movie's graphic violence and cruelty, with Donald Clarke of The Irish Times condemning it as a "fistful of misogyny" and "offensively sexist".

On the review aggregator website Rotten Tomatoes, Once Upon a Time in America has an approval rating of 86% based on 56 reviews. The website's critic consensus reads: "Sergio Leone's epic crime drama is visually stunning, stylistically bold, and emotionally haunting, and filled with great performances from the likes of Robert De Niro and James Woods." On Metacritic, the film has a weighted average score of 75 out of 100 based on reviews from 20 critics, indicating "generally favorable" reviews.

The film has been ranked as one of the best films of the gangster genre. In Empire magazine, critic Adam Smith compared the film favorably to The Godfather, saying, "Leone's film is arguably the better of the two – if the less popular – eschewing, as it does, the soapy melodramatics of Coppola's family saga in favour of less audience-friendly, but more intriguing, ambiguity and symbolism."

When Sight & Sound asked several UK critics in 2002 what their favorite films of the last 25 years were, Once Upon a Time in America placed at number 10. In 2015, the film was ranked at number nine on Time Out's list of the 50 best gangster films of all time. In 2016, the Directors Guild of America ranked the film 75th on its list of The 80 Best-Directed Films since the Guild’s founding in 1936. In 2021, The Guardian cited it as the fourth greatest mobster film ever made. In 2023, The A.V. Club ranked it seventh in its list of the greatest gangster movies of all time.

=== Accolades ===
Unlike its modern critical success, the initial American release did not fare well with critics and received no Academy Award nominations. The film's music was disqualified from Oscar consideration for a technicality, as the studio accidentally omitted the composer's name from the opening credits when trimming its running time for the American release.

Ceremony	Category	Nominee	Result
38th British Academy Film Awards	Best Costume Design	Gabriella Pescucci	Won
38th British Academy Film Awards	Best Film Music	Ennio Morricone	Won
38th British Academy Film Awards	Best Direction	Sergio Leone	Nominated
38th British Academy Film Awards	Best Actress in a Supporting Role	Tuesday Weld	Nominated
38th British Academy Film Awards	Best Cinematography	Tonino Delli Colli	Nominated
42nd Golden Globe Awards	Best Director	Sergio Leone	Nominated
42nd Golden Globe Awards	Best Original Score	Ennio Morricone	Nominated
8th Japan Academy Film Prize	Outstanding Foreign Language Film	–	Won
10th Los Angeles Film Critics Association Awards	Best Film	–	Nominated
10th Los Angeles Film Critics Association Awards	Best Director	Sergio Leone	Nominated
10th Los Angeles Film Critics Association Awards	Best Music Score	Ennio Morricone	Won

== See also ==
- List of films cut over the director's opposition

== Bibliography ==
- Eberwein, Robert; Bell-Metereau, Rebecca (2010). Acting for America: Movie Stars of the 1980s. Rutgers University Press. ISBN 978-0-8135-4760-2.
- Frayling, Christopher (2012). Sergio Leone: Something to Do with Death. Minneapolis: University of Minnesota Press. ISBN 978-0816646838.
- Hughes, Howard (2006). Crime Wave: The Filmgoers' Guide to the Great Crime Movies. New York City: I. B. Tauris. ISBN 978-1845112196.
- McCarty, John (May 24, 2005). Bullets Over Hollywood: The American Gangster Picture from the Silents to "The Sopranos". Boston, Massachusetts: Da Capo Press. ISBN 978-0306814297. Archived from the original on April 10, 2016.
- Simsolo, Noël (1987). Conversations avec Sergio Leone. Paris: Stock. ISBN 2-234-02049-2.
