= Mother and Daughter: The Loving War =

American television film

Mother and Daughter: The Loving War is a 1980 American TV movie starring Tuesday Weld.

== Cast ==
- Tuesday Weld
- Frances Sternhagen
- Kathleen Beller
- Edward Winter
- Harry Chapin
- Elizabeth Kerr
- Melendy Britt
