= Big guitar =

The Guns Of Navarone by Al Caiola
Al Caiola's rendition of the movie theme.

"Big guitar" is a term referring to a style of guitar playing popular in rock and roll instrumentals in the early 1960s. An electric lead guitar played solo lines with a bass tendency, and reverberation was applied for a deep sound.

The 1957 instrumental "Raunchy" was probably the first such big hit. Duane Eddy and his producer Lee Hazlewood probably perfected the sound in 1958 with "Movin and Groovin" and "Rebel Rouser".

The term could also be applied to the physical guitar of the player, but not because of any physical properties. For example, "the big guitar of Al Caiola".

Leading practitioners included Al Caiola ("The Magnificent Seven" and "Bonanza") and Billy Strange. The Ventures and many other instrumental groups did not generally fit this category.

It became incorporated in many pop songs. The Lawrence Welk orchestra used it in "Scarlet O'Hara", Henry Mancini used it in "Experiment In Terror" and "Peter Gunn". The main James Bond theme uses it.

At least two instrumentals had the title "Big Guitar": a single by Owen Bradley in 1958, and an album selection on Al Caiola's "Solid Gold Guitar" in 1961.
