= The Winter of Our Discontent (Hallmark Hall of Fame) =

1983 television film by Waris Hussein

- Hallmark Hall of Fame episode
- Print advertisement for television production
- Episode no.: Season 33; Episode 1
- Directed by: Waris Hussein
- Written by: Michael de Guzman
- Based on: the novel by John Steinbeck
- Cinematography by: Robbie Greenberg
- Editing by: Fred A. Chulack A.C.E.
- Production code: 144
- Original air date: December 6, 1983
- Running time: 105 minutes

Guest appearances
- Donald Sutherland; Teri Garr; Tuesday Weld

Episode chronology
← Previous "Thursday's Child"	Next → "The Master of Ballantrae"
- Hallmark Hall of Fame

The Winter of Our Discontent is a 1983 American drama television film directed by Waris Hussein, based on a loose adaptation of the 1961 novel of the same name by John Steinbeck. The film featured in the Hallmark Hall of Fame series of telemovies, and stars Donald Sutherland, Teri Garr, and Tuesday Weld, who received a Primetime Emmy Award nomination for her performance.

== Plot ==
The story is about a Long Islander named Ethan Allen Hawley who works as a clerk in a grocery store he used to own, but which is now owned by an Italian immigrant. His wife and children want more than what he can give them because of his lowly position.

He finds out that the immigrant that owns his store is an illegal alien, turns him in to the Immigration and Naturalization Service, and receives the store by deceiving the immigrant. Ethan continues to have feelings of depression and anxiety brought about by his uneasy relationship with his wife and kids, risky flirtation with Margie Young-Hunt, and a plan to sell his property and a house of a close friend to a banker who wants to build a shopping mall.

== Cast ==
- Donald Sutherland as Ethan Hawley
- Teri Garr as Mary Hawley
- Tuesday Weld as Margie Young-Hunt
- Michael Gazzo as Marullo
- Richard Masur as Danny
- E. G. Marshall as Mr. Baker
- Kirk Brennan as Allen Hawley
- Amanita Hyldahl as Ellen Hawley
- Nan Martin as Mrs. Baker
- Macon McCalman as Reverend Sloane
- Ben Piazza as Louis Brock
- Margaret Wheeler as Miss Elgar
- Tom Pletts as Dave
- Linda Hoy as Mildred

== Production ==
The storyline of The Winter of Our Discontent is loosely based on the novel of the same name by John Steinbeck, adapted for television by Michael de Guzman. De Guzman said that he reworked the script many times, right through to the process of filming. This was partly because of the very complicated plot and sub-plots, and partly to make the central character more likeable, which was deemed essential for television.

The film was directed by Waris Hussein.

== Release ==
The film was broadcast on CBS-TV on December 6, 1983, as part of the Hallmark Hall of Fame series of telemovies.

== Awards and nominations ==
Year	Award	Category	Nominee	Result
1984	36th Primetime Emmy Awards	Outstanding Supporting Actress in a Limited Series or a Special	Tuesday Weld	Nominated
