= Scorned and Swindled =

1984 American TV film

Scorned and Swindled is a 1984 American TV film directed by Paul Wendkos. The film score was composed by Billy Goldenberg. The film was based on a true story.

== Cast ==
- Tuesday Weld as Sharon Clark
- Peter Coyote as Anthony Ristelli
- Keith Carradine as John Boslett
- Sheree North as Maxine Wagner
- Fionnula Flanagan as Margaret
- Susan Ruttan as Margie
- Pat Corley as Ty Jenkins
- Monica Parker as Dolores
- Lynn Hallowell as Bra Strap Lady
- Dan Rogers as Motel Clerk
- John Bishop as Bike Boy
- Oscar Rowland as Reverend Perkins
- Craig Clyde as Man in Western Wear
- Michael Ruud as Redneck (as Michael Rudd)
- Michael Alvarez as Sunglass Kid
- George K. Sullivan as Cop #1 (as George Sullivan)
- Bruce Newbold as Bellhop
- Barta Heiner as Secretary

== Reception ==
The New York Times called it "a fascinating slice of Americana on the seamier side... This is a strange, rather offbeat exercise for a television movie. There is no uplifting ending. There is no inspirational message. There is only the unsettling smell of vaguely unpleasant realities. Paul Wendkos directs with an unerring ability to make the decidedly bizarre seem almost comfortably commonplace. The performances are quite good, and Miss Weld is even more than that."
