= Doc Pomus =

American musician (1925–1991)

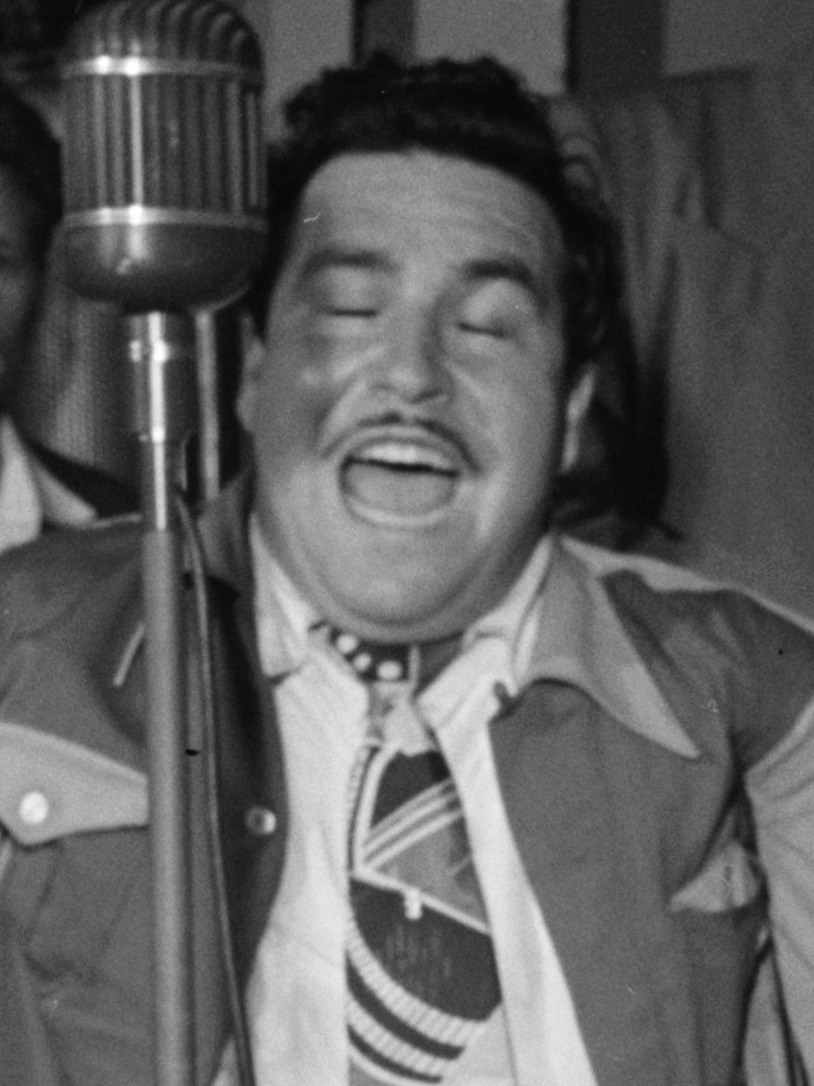
- Pomus in 1947

Background information
- Born: Jerome Solon Felder; June 27, 1925; Brooklyn, New York City, United States
- Died: March 14, 1991 (aged 65) Manhattan, New York City, United States
- Genres: Blues; rock and roll
- Occupations: Singer; songwriter; producer

Jerome Solon Felder (June 27, 1925 – March 14, 1991), known professionally as Doc Pomus, was an American blues singer and songwriter. He is best known as the co-writer of many rock and roll hits. Pomus was inducted into the Rock and Roll Hall of Fame as a non-performer in 1992, the Songwriters Hall of Fame (1992), and the Blues Hall of Fame (2012).

== Early life ==
Jerome Solon Felder was born on June 27, 1925, in Williamsburg, Brooklyn, New York. He was the son of British born Jewish immigrants. Having contracted polio as a boy, he was in an iron lung for a year, and walked with the aid of crutches. Later, due to post-polio syndrome exacerbated by an accident, Felder relied on a wheelchair.

Pomus was homeschooled for much of elementary and junior high school. He had a high IQ, and excelled at the insult challenge among teens and young men, "playing the dozens". He also was facile at creating his own lyrics for blues songs of the day. He became a fan of the blues after hearing a Big Joe Turner record, "Piney Brown Blues", which changed the direction of his life. He attended Bushwick High School and then Brooklyn College, where he studied music and learned to play piano and saxophone, from 1943 to 1945.

His brother is New York attorney Raoul Felder.

== Career ==
=== Performing career ===
Using the stage name Doc Pomus, the teenage Felder began performing as a blues singer. His stage name was not inspired by anyone in particular; he just thought it sounded better for a blues singer than Jerry Felder, although it included a "nod" to blues singer Doctor Clayton. He began going to jazz clubs before working up the nerve to perform in front of mostly black audiences, doing his version of popular blues songs that were received with great enthusiasm by club patrons. The 18-year-old Pomus debuted at George's Tavern in Greenwich Village. Clubs would invite him to perform, and on one occasion the great saxophonist Lester Young sat in with him.

Pomus stated that more often than not, he was the only Caucasian in the clubs, but that as a Jew with polio, he felt a special underdog kinship with African Americans, while the audiences respected his courage and were impressed by his talent. Pomus performed as a singer for 10–12 years around metropolitan New York (1944–1954), heading a band that included Mickey Baker and King Curtis. Gigging at clubs in and around New York City, Pomus often performed with Milt Jackson, Horace Silver, Buddy Tate, Baker, and Curtis. Pomus is reported to have recorded more than fifty record sides of music (although others have reported the number at about forty sides) as a singer in the 1940s and 1950s for Chess, Apollo, Dawn, Gotham, and other recording companies (such as Savoy, Atlantic and Coral).

In his early thirties, Pomus's song "Heartlessly" was being played by disc jockey Alan Freed. When the company with rights to the song learned about Pomus's life and circumstances, they had no interest in promoting his singing career, and he realized that he would need another way to make a living. He stopped performing live in 1957.

=== Songwriting ===
In 1946, Gatemouth Moore had recorded one of Pomus's own songs for National Records. In 1947, he became one of Atlantic Records original songwriters. In the early 1950s, Pomus began writing magazine articles, as well as songwriting for Lavern Baker, Ruth Brown, Ray Charles, and Big Joe Turner (whose music had changed Pomus's life). Charles's 1956 recording of the R&B top ten song "Lonely Avenue" marked a national breakthrough for Pomus, although he made little money.

In 1957, he married an aspiring Broadway actress from Westville, Illinois, named Willi Burke. (She later performed in the Broadway play Fiorello.) They were divorced in 1966.

His first rock-and-roll songwriting break came when the Coasters recorded a hit with the song "Young Blood". He had sent a demo of the song to Jerry Leiber and Mike Stoller, his role models for this new kind of songwriting. They substantially rewrote the song for the Coasters, and Pomus first heard about it being recorded by playing it on a jukebox. Still, Pomus had co-credit as lyricist, and soon received a royalty check for $2,500 (US$28,658 in 2025 dollars) (reported elsewhere as $1,500), an event that convinced him that songwriting was a career worth pursuing. By 1957, Pomus had given up performing in favor of songwriting.

Pomus collaborated with pianist Mort Shuman, whom he met when Shuman was dating Pomus's younger cousin. Songwriter Otis Blackwell introduced the duo to Hill & Range Music Co./Rumbalero Music at its offices in New York City's Brill Building. Pomus asked Shuman to write with him because Pomus did not know much about contemporary rock and roll, whereas Shuman was acquainted with popular artists of the day. For the most part, Pomus wrote the lyrics while Shuman composed the melodies, but they often collaborated on both aspects of their songs. Together, they wrote "A Teenager in Love", "Save the Last Dance for Me", "Hushabye", "This Magic Moment", "Turn Me Loose", "Sweets For My Sweet" (a hit for the Drifters, and later the Searchers), "Go, Jimmy, Go", "Little Sister", "Can't Get Used to Losing You", "Suspicion", "Surrender", and "(Marie's the Name of) His Latest Flame". They wrote regularly for Elvis Presley and the Drifters, and wrote hits for others, such as Bobby Darin, Dion and the Belmonts, and Fabian. Pomus's innovation in writing his early rock song lyrics was focusing on the realities and difficulties of being a teenager, rather than trying to paint an idealized teenage life.

"Save the Last Dance for Me" has been called his crowning achievement. The lyrics came to him at his wedding, watching his wife dance with others, Pomus being unable to dance because of polio's effects on his body. The song has been performed by singers as diverse as country singer Eric Church and jazz guitarist Bill Frisell, and it was a top ten country hit for both Dolly Parton and Emmylou Harris. It is said to be the last song that Leonard Cohen performed on stage.

Phil Spector became a protege of Pomus. During the late 1950s and early 1960s, Pomus wrote several songs with Spector ("Young Boy Blues", "Ecstasy", "First Taste of Love" and "What Am I To Do?"), Mike Stoller and Jerry Leiber ("Young Blood" and "She's Not You"), and other Brill Building-era writers.

=== Later life ===
With the advent of self-contained singer-performer groups such as the Beatles, the importance and career prospects faded for freelance rock & roll songwriters like Pomus. While he continued writing and had sporadic success, Pomus's main means of income shifted to professional gambling, which he left after ten years, due to increased levels of violence in the field. Later in his life, his income increased from royalty payments when more performers started covering his songs.

In the 1970s and 1980s, in his eleventh-floor, two-room apartment at the Westover Hotel at 253 West 72nd Street, Pomus wrote songs with Dr. John, Ken Hirsch, and Willy DeVille for what he said were "... those people stumbling around in the night out there, uncertain or not always so certain of exactly where they fit in and where they were headed." These later songs ("There Must Be A Better World", "There Is Always One More Time", "That World Outside", "You Just Keep Holding On", and "Something Beautiful Dying")—recorded by Willy DeVille, B.B. King, Irma Thomas, Marianne Faithfull, Charlie Rich, Ruth Brown, Dr. John (Mac Rebennack), James Booker, Jimmy Witherspoon, and Johnny Adams—are considered by some, including writer Peter Guralnick, musician and songwriter Dr. John, and producer Joel Dorn, to rank among Pomus's best. B. B King's recording of "There Must Be A Better World Somewhere" won a Grammy in 1981. Pomus also played an important role with John Belushi in creating the back-up band for the Blues Brothers in the 1970s, and was Bette Midler's musical advisor, bringing her to national attention.

Pomus also focused in later life on helping forgotten R&B artists who had fallen on hard times. The Rhythm and Blues Foundation provides artist grants through the Doc Pomus Artist Assistance Fund.

=== Influence on other performers ===
John Lennon told Pomus the first song the Beatles practiced together was a Pomus song. Bob Dylan came to Pomus when Dylan was experiencing writer's block. Later in Pomus's life, performers as diverse as Bruce Springsteen and Dolly Parton covered his songs, and others like Dr. John and Lou Reed became a part of his life. In July 1985, Ben E. King (the original singer of "Save the Last Dance for Me"), Dr. John, DeVille, and Marshall Crenshaw performed in a tribute program to Pomus in New York. After his death, a tribute album was produced in 1995. Till the Night Is Gone: A Tribute to Doc Pomus includes Dylan, King, Rebennack, Reed, Thomas, John Hiatt, Shawn Colvin, Solomon Burke, and Los Lobos.

The documentary film A.K.A. Doc Pomus (2012), conceived by Pomus's daughter Sharyn Felder, directed by filmmaker Peter Miller, edited by Amy Linton, and produced by Felder, Hechter, and Miller, presents Pomus's biography.

== Death ==
Pomus died on March 14, 1991, of lung cancer at age 65 at NYU Medical Center in Manhattan.

== Legacy and influence ==
Together with Shuman, and individually, Pomus was a key figure in the development of popular music. The duo co-wrote such hits as "A Teenager in Love", "Save the Last Dance for Me", "This Magic Moment", "Sweets for My Sweet", "Viva Las Vegas", "Little Sister", "Surrender", "Can't Get Used to Losing You", "Suspicion", "Turn Me Loose" and "A Mess of Blues". Their songs have been recorded by hundreds of artists.

- Pomus was elected to the Songwriters Hall of Fame and the Rock and Roll Hall of Fame.
- In 1991, he was the first non-African American recipient of the Rhythm and Blues Foundation Pioneer Award. Ray Charles presented the award via a pre-recorded message.
- The funk band Cameo was heavily influenced by Pomus's song-writing style and frequently acknowledges his impact before performing their hit song "Word Up".
- Longtime friend, jazz singer Jimmy Scott, performed at Pomus's funeral, a performance that resurrected his career. Other attendees included Seymour Stein, who subsequently signed Scott to Sire Records, and Lou Reed, who thereafter would regularly work with Scott until his death. Pomus had been imploring his friends to hear Scott sing for many years.
- The song "Doc's Blues" was written as a tribute to Pomus by his close friend Andrew Vachss. The lyrics originally appeared in Vachss's 1990 novel Blossom. "Doc's Blues" was recorded by bluesman Son Seals on Seals's last album Lettin' Go.
- Responsible for Lou Reed's introduction to the music industry in the early 1960s, Pomus was one of two friends Reed memorialized on his 1992 album Magic and Loss.
- In 1995, Rhino Records released a tribute album to Pomus titled Till the Night Is Gone. Pomus's songs are performed by Bob Dylan, Brian Wilson, Dion, Dr. John, Irma Thomas, Solomon Burke, John Hiatt, Shawn Colvin, Aaron Neville, Lou Reed, the Band, B.B. King, Los Lobos, and Rosanne Cash.
- In 2010, Ben Folds and Nick Hornby named their collaborative album on which the song "Doc Pomus" appeared Lonely Avenue. The lyrics referenced an excerpt from Pomus's unfinished memoir, February 21, 1984: "I was never one of those happy cripples who stumbled around smiling and shiny-eyed, trying to get the world to cluck its tongue and shake its head sadly in my direction. They'd never look at me and say, 'What a wonderful, courageous fellow.'" The album features lyrics by British author Hornby set to music by American performer Folds. It was released on September 28, 2010.
- John Goodman's character in the Coen brothers' 2013 dramedy Inside Llewyn Davis is loosely inspired by Pomus.
- Bob Dylan's 2022 book The Philosophy of Modern Song is dedicated to Doc Pomus.
