= Rusty Jacobs =

American former film actor (born 1967)

- Born: July 10, 1967 (age 58); New York City, U.S.
- Occupation: Actor

Rusty Jacobs (born July 10, 1967, in New York City) is an American former film actor. Jacobs is known for appearing in films such as Once Upon a Time in America and Taps.

He is a reporter for North Carolina Public Radio. From 2007-2017, he earned his J.D. degree at UNC Chapel Hill, and then served as an Assistant District Attorney in North Carolina.

== Filmography ==
Year	Title	Role	Notes
1981	Taps	Rusty	
1984	Once Upon a Time in America	Young Max / David	
1996	Angesichts der Wälder	Noach	(final film role)
