= Scott Tiler =

American actor

Scott Tiler (1971~,Born Scott Schutzman) is an American actor and acting coach, best known for playing the young David "Noodles" Aaronson in Sergio Leone's Once Upon a Time in America (1984). In 1985, he starred in the film adaptation of the literary sequel to Freaky Friday, titled Billions for Boris (aka A Billion for Boris). In 1987, he appeared in both the teen comedy film Three O'Clock High and the John Sayles movie City of Hope.

Tiler is also an acting coach and stage director.

== Filmography ==
=== Cinema ===
- 1984: Once Upon a Time in America as Young Noodles
- 1985: Billions for Boris as Boris Harris
- 1987: Three O'Clock High as Bruce Chalmer
- 1989: Misplaced as Eric
- 1991: City of Hope as Vinnie

=== Short films ===
- 2016: Rosetta's Blues as Priest
- 2016: Your Secret as Jim Barnett
- 2018: The Blurry World of Marcello Casagrande as Agent Dan

=== Television ===
- 1981: Rise and Shine as Joel Beidermeyer (Episode: "Pilot")
- 1985: ABC Weekend Special as Stanley Olinger (Episode: "The Adventures of a Two-Minute Werewolf")
- 1989: Flying Blind as Mick (TV movie)
- 1996: New York Undercover as James Tesher (Episode: "Fire Show")
