= Harry Grey =

American novelist

- Born: Herschel Goldberg; November 2, 1901; Kyiv, Russian Empire
- Died: October 1, 1980 (aged 78); Manhattan, New York, United States
- Occupations: Author, writer
- Spouse: Mildred Becker (m. 1932)
- Writing career
- Notable work: The Hoods

Herschel Goldberg (November 2, 1901 – October 1, 1980), better known as Harry Grey, was a Russian Jewish-American criminal and writer. His first book, The Hoods (1952), was the model for the 1984 film Once Upon a Time in America by Sergio Leone, where his part was played by Robert De Niro. The memoir—partially factual, and partially fictional—was written when Goldberg was incarcerated at Sing-Sing.

After The Hoods, Grey published two more books, Call Me Duke (1955) and Portrait of a Mobster (1958), also based on his experience as a gangster, but these were far less successful and as a consequence the conclusion to The Hoods contained in Call Me Duke went largely unnoticed. A "Golden Palm Star", part of the Palm Springs Walk of Stars, was dedicated to Grey in 1999.

== Biography ==
Born in Odessa (then part of the Russian Empire) in 1901, son of Israel and Celia Goldberg, Goldberg emigrated to the United States in 1905, dropping out of school in the seventh grade. He was the brother of Hyman Goldberg, a syndicated columnist and food critic for the New York Post and author of several books including "Our Man in the Kitchen", a compilation of recipes from his column as Prudence Penny.

In 1912, Goldberg's father became seriously ill and required a medical operation. During his stay in hospital, his wife began cooking meals for men in the neighborhood who were saving money to bring their families to America. When Israel came out of hospital he found that Celia had a flourishing business and Israel started a restaurant. All the children, including Harry and Hyman, helped out.

In 1932, Goldberg married Mildred Becker, a college graduate and had three children: Beverle, Harvey, and Simeon. After being hospitalized by an accident in his 50s, Harry decided to write about life in the 1920s and 30s and the syndicates that controlled businesses in New York. To protect himself and his family he changed the family name to Grey.

Grey died in October 1980, shortly before filming of Once Upon a Time in America began.

In December 1999, Harry's son Simeon sponsored a star on the Palm Springs Walk of Stars for his father under the name of Harry "Noodles" Grey. Biographical details are attached to this star.

== Bibliography ==
- The Hoods
- Call Me Duke
- Portrait of a Mobster

== See also ==
- David "Noodles" Aaronson – a character in The Hoods.
