= F. Scott Fitzgerald in Hollywood =

1975 American TV movie about F. Scott Fitzgerald

- Genre: Biographical drama
- Written by: James Costigan
- Directed by: Anthony Page
- Starring: Jason Miller; Tuesday Weld; Julia Foster
- Music by: Morton Gould
- Country of origin: United States
- Original language: English

Production
- Executive producer: Herbert Brodkin
- Producer: Robert Berger
- Cinematography: James Crabe
- Editor: Sidney Katz
- Running time: 100 minutes
- Production company: Titus Productions

Original release
- Network: ABC
- Release: December 17, 1975

F. Scott Fitzgerald in Hollywood is a 1975 American biographical drama television film about F. Scott Fitzgerald's screenwriting career.

It was directed by Anthony Page and written by James Costigan. It was mostly based on the memoirs of Sheilah Graham.

== Plot ==
In 1937, F. Scott Fitzgerald is trying to write scripts in Hollywood. He has a romance with Sheilah Graham and remembers his marriage to Zelda.

== Cast ==
- Jason Miller as F. Scott Fitzgerald
- Tuesday Weld as Zelda Fitzgerald
- Julia Foster as Sheilah Graham
- Dolores Sutton as Dorothy Parker
- Susanne Benton as The Starlet
- Michael Lerner as Marvin Margulies
- Tom Ligon as Alan Campbell
- John Randolph as Rupert Wahler
- Tom Rosqui as Edwin Knopf

== Reception ==
The New York Times said the film "merely rehashed" the Fitzgerald story.
