= Tiger (Fabian song) =

Single by Fabian Forte
- B-side: "Mighty Cold"
- Released: 1959
- Recorded: 1959
- Genre: Pop rock
- Length: 2:25
- Label: Chancellor Records
- Songwriter: Ollie Jones
- Producer: Peter De Angelis

Fabian Forte singles chronology
""Turn Me Loose"" (1959)	"Tiger" (1959)	""Come On and Get Me"" (1959)

"Tiger" is a 1959 song by Fabian Forte, written by Ollie Jones. It was Fabian's most successful single, reaching #3 on the U.S. Billboard, Hot 100 charts. "Tiger" was Fabian's only entry on the US, Billboard, Hot R&B Sides chart, where it reached #15.
