= David "Noodles" Aaronson =

- First appearance: The Hoods (1952)
- Last appearance: Once Upon a Time in America (1984)
- Created by: Harry Grey
- Portrayed by: Robert De Niro; Scott Tiler (young)

In-universe information
- Full name: David Aaronson
- Alias: Robert Williams
- Nickname: Noodles
- Occupation: Gangster
- Significant other: Deborah

David "Noodles" Aaronson is a fictional character who is the protagonist of the 1952 semi-autobiographical novel The Hoods by Harry Grey, and of the book's 1984 film adaptation, Once Upon a Time in America, where he was portrayed by Robert De Niro. Noodles reappears, only to die in 1937, in Grey's second novel Call Me Duke (1955). However, Call Me Duke has never been filmed, and the material concerning Noodles was not used in Once Upon a Time in America where he is depicted still living in 1968.

== Character fictional life ==
=== Early life ===
According to the novel and film in which he appears, David "Noodles" Aaronson is born in either 1903 or 1904 into poverty in a Jewish enclave in Manhattan's Lower East Side. He has one brother. In 1918, when Noodles is age 14 or 15, he forms a gang with his friends Phillip "Cockeye" Stein, Patrick "Patsy" Goldberg and a young Italian boy named Dominic. Together the group "rolls" (robs) drunks in a bar run by local Irish-American mobster Bugsy, whose protection racket they help maintain. When about to roll a drunk, Noodles meets Maximilian "Max" Bercovicz. The two cross paths later, become friends, and together blackmail a policeman, forcing him to pay for their times with a local child prostitute and to cover up their crimes.

When they begin to operate independently of him, Bugsy has some of the gang's underlings beat them and steal their money. Needing protection from Bugsy, Noodles and Max meet with the Capuano brothers, successful bootleggers, and show them a method by which the bootleggers might salvage crates of booze when tossed into the sea when the rumrunners cargo boats were confronted by the Coast Guard. Having been paid for their services in protecting the Capuanos' shipment, they stash part of their payment.

After stashing their money, the group is chased by Bugsy, who opens fire on them and kills Dominic. Enraged, Noodles stabs Bugsy repeatedly, almost disemboweling him. However, when Bugsy fires a round from his gun it alerts nearby police officers who then come to the scene. Noodles murders Bugsy and then takes on two police officers, stabbing one and then being battered unconscious by his partner. Noodles is then sent to prison.

=== 1933 ===
After serving 12 years for the murder, Noodles is released from prison and picked up by Max. He returns to working with his gang. Mobster Frankie Minaldi gives the gang an assignment to rob a Detroit jeweler of some jewels together with 'Joe from Detroit' and then kill him. The gang does the job, Noodles rapes the woman who gave Joe the information needed to pull off the job, and they later shoot Joe and his gang in a car, with Noodles personally gunning down one of Joe's henchmen who had escaped the car and fled into a factory.

The gang becomes further involved with the Mafia, and Noodles becomes re-involved with Deborah, a girl from his old neighborhood with whom he had had a relationship. He goes with her on an extravagant date, but he is left feeling rejected after she informs him she is leaving for Hollywood. She kisses him on the car ride home, but he refuses to stop and rapes her in front of his chauffeur.

Max is eager to advance the gang's position, while Noodles has misgivings about what they are doing. After the repeal of Prohibition, Noodles leaves for Florida rather than join Max in working with the teamsters union. Max yields and goes to Florida with him, but then begins planning an impossible heist of the Federal Reserve Bank. Noodles places an anonymous call to the police, hoping that Max, Patsy, and Cockeye will be arrested before they can attempt the Federal Reserve job, which Noodles believes would be suicidal. Instead the police kill Max, Patsy, and Cockeye in a gunfight, during which Max's body is burned beyond recognition. Noodles' new girlfriend is murdered by the Syndicate, and Noodles hides out in an opium den. He escapes his pursuers and goes to retrieve the loot the gang had stashed years previously. When he finds the money gone, he flees to Buffalo, where he lives for 35 years under the name 'Robert Williams'.

=== 1968 ===
Years later, Noodles returns to New York from hiding, having received a mysterious letter. He visits the mausoleum where his friends' bodies were moved and discovers a plaque dedicated to them by him (something he had not done) and a key to the same money locker he had found empty in 1933. In the locker he finds money and a note stating it is pre-payment for a murder-for-hire. He also receives an invitation to a party from a man called Bailey.

He learns that Deborah has become a famous actress, and while meeting with Deborah after a performance, he seemingly reconciles with her. However, he also knows through his investigations regarding Bailey that Deborah knows who Bailey is and realises that Max is Bailey, when his son appears who looks like Max in his adolescent years. He also learns that Max faked his own death in the shootout with help from the Syndicate, killed his friends for that purpose, stole the money and became "Bailey", a very rich man currently under investigation for corruption. Bailey had left the money to hire Noodles to assassinate him - thus allowing Noodles to obtain his revenge, as well as to let Max, as "Bailey", die with dignity, because he knows he is finished because of this investigation. However, Noodles refuses. After leaving the party, Noodles perhaps witnesses the suicide of Max, who leaves the party after him and maybe throws himself into a garbage truck, which drives past in front of Noodles.

Noodles feels happiness after this event and is at peace with his past now, being able to move on with his life from now on, without having to look back anymore. And he does.

== Analysis ==
Film critic Owen Gleiberman wrote that the character of Noodles, as an underworld Hamlet, develops through the story to become one of its two heroes.

The jumping backward and forward in time in Once Upon A Time In America is done through the memories of Noodles, showing how Noodles is haunted by his involvement in the deaths of his childhood companions.

In Cinema and Multiculturalism, it is offered that while the story Once Upon a Time in America is ostensibly about the "children of immigrants scraping the bottom of the American melting pot" and about "Jewish criminal kingpin David "Noodles" Aaronson, who dreams of greatness 'once upon a time', and spends the rest of his days wondering why his salad days wilted", they offer that the film is more "about time itself, and how Noodles learns that it's more important to make sense of your life, your own history".

=== Casting of Robert De Niro ===
Robert De Niro was not the first choice for the role of Noodles in Once Upon a Time in America; director Sergio Leone originally considered Gérard Depardieu, and James Cagney for the older Noodles. De Niro had to convince Leone of his ability to portray Noodles in both the character's twenties and his sixties, and of his focus on character authenticity.
