= A Lion Walks Among Us =

- Bus Stop episode
- Episode no.: Season 1 Episode 10
- Directed by: Robert Altman
- Written by: Ellis Kadison
- Based on: The Judgement by Tom Wicker
- Production code: 20th Century Fox Television
- Original air date: 3 December 1961

Guest appearances
- Fabian Forte as Luke Freeman; Dianne Foster as Sally Wagner; Philip Abbott as Oliver; Jenny Maxwell as Linda; Dabbs Greer as Jeffrey

Episode chronology
← Previous "The Man From Bootstrap"	Next → "Call Back Yesterday"

"A Lion Walks Among Us" is a 1961 episode of the TV drama series Bus Stop, with guest star Fabian Forte, which was highly controversial because of its depiction of violence. It was an early work of director Robert Altman.

== Plot ==
The District Attorney's wife, Sally, picks up hitchhiker Luke Freeman on the way to Sunrise, Colorado. He makes a play for her but she kicks him out of the car.

Luke then robs a grocery store, killing the grocer, Mr Jordan, by throwing him against a table then shooting him dead. After doing this, Luke sings a song to himself, "I Couldn't Hear Nobody Pray".

Luke goes on to visit a tavern, Jefty's Road House, where he starts a brawl after flirting with a young girl, Linda, and singing a song. He pulls a switchblade but before the fight gets too serious Sheriff Will Mayberry intervenes and brings him in for questioning about the shooting at the grocery store.

Luke tries to cover, telling a story about the woman who gave him a lift into town and tried to seduce him. The D.A. Glenn Wagner realises he is talking about his wife, and attacks Luke. Luke is arrested for robbery and murder and put on trial. He sings while in prison.

Sally is called to give evidence but Luke's lawyer, Oliver West, discredits her by bringing up her alcoholism, her treatment by a psychiatrist and her attraction to Luke. Sally breaks down on the stand and the judge releases Luke on the ground of insufficient evidence.

By this stage Luke has a group of female fans, including Linda from the Tavern. Luke needs money for a ticket out of town. He asks Linda, who slaps his face. He then robs and murders his lawyer for the money.

Sally swings by and offers him a lift. He accepts but Sally then drives off a cliff, killing them both in a murder-suicide.

== Production ==
The script was based on the novel The Judgement by Tom Wicker. The working title of the show was "Told By an Idiot" but this was changed shortly before airing "to point up the moral more strongly", according to the network. The episode title is explained by a pair of intertitles, at the episode start and end, presenting the Bible verse source.

The part of a psychopathic killer was completely different to anything Fabian had done. "Robert Altman wasn't sure that I could do it", recalls the singer. "So I had to audition for him. And it was a wonderful experience. He looked at me and he said, 'You got it.'"

"I was nervous as hell", says Fabian. "I walked in and he reminded me of a hippy-dippy kind of guy which I loved. He was cool, he was warm, he asked me a lot about my personal life, I guess to put me at ease."

Altman later remembered "Fabian was just a kid, not a good actor, and I worked with him, not trying to teach him about how to act but just to loosen him up."

"At first he wanted to improvise a few things about the character", recalls Fabian. "I read with him. We read from the script and I think it was because of his input I totally transformed myself into this really f*cked up guy. He opened windows into the guy – "how would you feel if you had this in your past?" He really wanted you to have that power to see if you could do it. We did it eight or nine different ways. He didn't say much, just a word here or a word there. He had the power to make you go to another dimension. He was that way on set, too. He never bludgeoned you or was hard with you. He was very astute – very few words but right to the point emotionally. Then he'd walk away. He did that with all the actors. To me it was, "Wow if this is the way acting is, this is what I want to be part of."

Altman remembers that Fabian would often come to the director's house, where Altman's 12-year-old daughter kept a Kleenex on which Fabian had blown his nose.

== Reception ==
The episode was criticized for its violence. The series' primary sponsor, the Brown and Williamson Tobacco Company, refused to sponsor the program, claiming that the presence of Fabian would lure teenage audiences to what should be adult viewing. Warner Bros agreed to step in to promote their film The Roman Spring of Mrs Stone; as the main sponsors had refused to advertise, trailers for upcoming movies and episodes of the show were promoted instead. Twenty-five ABC affiliates refused to air the program.

There was much discussion over when to air it. ABC president Oliver Treyz refused to pull it from the station's line up, but when it went out it was without commercials other than for other ABC shows.

"It has a very moral point", argues producer Robert Blees. "Roy Huggins was a very devout Catholic – it was sometimes almost impossible to keep his Catholicism out of the show. All the people who criticised it for being evil or approving of crime are absolutely wrong."

=== Critical response ===
The Chicago Daily Tribune said Fabian played his part "effectively" but that "TV like this is a stimulant to crime and has no place in the living room on a mid-Sunday evening".

Jack Gould of The New York Times called it:

An hour of dark and sordid ugliness – cheaper than anything yet seen on television... a play can often be extremely unpleasant but still command interest and respect because of the depth of its insight into characters. But last night's presentation had no such justification or excuse; it was unrelieved exploitation of the base instincts of an animal run amuck... Last night's onslaught of mayhem and suggestiveness surely was misplaced in an hour known to appeal to a substantial young audience. The glorification of a psychotic killer combined with the oft-imitated mannerisms of a teenage idol surely was not attractive.

A few days later Gould attacked the program again, calling the show:

A disgraceful and contemptible flaunting of decency, an indescribably coarse glorification of vulgarity to win easy rating... An arrogant hood was shown murdering persons for the fun of it, wisecracking about sex in a manner bordering on sheer filth, making innuendos suitable to a bordello, reviling social attitudes, sneering at authority and displaying an animal-like barbarism... A commercial exploitation of sensationalism and savagery, a depiction of the ugliness of man to furnish cheap thrills.

Gould complained about the program in a third column in April 1962 on censorship on television.

Richard Van Enger's editing won him second prize for best TV editing of the year at the American Cinema Editors Awards.

=== Political impact ===
The show attracted negative comment from politicians in Washington, where Senator Thomas J. Dodd led a Congressional Committee into violence on television. The show was shown to the Committee and Treyz was cross examined about the program and said that he did not wish to discourage creative artists by "blue pencilling" their work.

Treyz later admitted broadcasting the program was a mistake. He was fired from ABC, Bus Stop was axed and its executive producer Roy Huggins was unable to get up any other shows with its production company, 20th Century Fox. "A Lion Walks Among Us" never screened again on prime time TV.

Roy Huggins who executive produced the episode later argued in Variety that its intention had been misunderstood:

Leading sociologists and theologians agree that the most dismaying characteristic of our time is the cult of reassurance, the compulsion to deny the existence of evil. In "Lion", the Fabian character was all allegory. He was pure evil, the fallen angel himself. We were trying to say that evil does exist, that to close our eyes to it is to court disaster. The actual heavy of the piece was the defence attorney, who in the words of one of our characters believed "there is no such thing as a bad boy". The evidence of evil was there for him to see, but he refused to see it. In the end, Luke killed him. Many who otherwise liked the show have criticized it because Luke was unmotivated in killing the attorney. It was the lack of stated motivation in this act that kept the allegory pure. The violent reaction to the show seemed to indicate that our premise was indeed all too clear. From my bed of pain I offer this advice to anyone who would appeal to a mass audience: Never question the cult of reassurance. Boost, don't knock!

A TV critic later described this argument as "Higgins' false premise, distorted description and bogus conclusion."

=== Fabian's career ===
Fabian was one of the few to benefit from the program, which gave a new respect for his acting. "This whole town looks at me differently now – I can feel it", he said. "It's a funny thing, though about that show. I think if it had been one of Hitchcock's TV shows and with no big name in it, nobody would have heard of it."

"The reviews were the best I ever got as an actor", he later reflected. "I give Altman a lot of credit for that."

His performance led to him receiving an offer to act in The Dick Powell Show and also The Longest Day. He later added:

In view of ruckus it raised, I choose more carefully now. I select things for dramatic content but steer away from the senseless killer type. I was sorry about the hubbub – no one pressured me into it. It seemed a real challenge after all the colorless teenage parts. It was the first time I'd had anything significant offered to me. Of course, parts along the same line came up afterward, but I turned them down. But I still think the experience outweighed the disadvantages.

== Proposed film version ==
According to Fabian, 20th Century Fox wanted to shoot some extra scenes and turn the episode into a feature film version for release in Europe. However he says he turned it down because "I could see it as being advertised over there as a wild kind of thing, and I didn't think it would do me any good."

In later years however he said he "was praying they would make the motion picture. But because of the heat, the advertisers, and the hearings with Senator Dodd, they buried it. That would have changed my whole life. Well, it might have."
