= Harry Volpe =

Italian jazz guitarist and music publisher (1906–1995)

- Born: Onofrio Volpe; March 27, 1906; Grotte, Sicily, Italy
- Died: January 16, 1995 (aged 88)
- Genre: Jazz
- Occupation: Musician
- Instrument: Archtop guitar
- Years active: 1919-1995

Harry Volpe (born Onofrio Volpe, March 27, 1906– January 16, 1995) was an early jazz guitarist and pioneering music publisher. Following the introduction and popularization of the guitar in jazz in the 1920s by Eddie Lang ‒ and prior to the world's introduction to the playing of Django Reinhardt and Charlie Christian ‒ Volpe was in the vanguard of leading early virtuoso jazz guitarists whose collective style became known as plectrum guitar marked by solo and duet jazz guitar compositions, and included Nick Lucas, Carl Kress, Dick McDonough, Al Valenti, and Frank Victor. Volpe is known for his early plectrum guitar duet recordings with Frank Victor in 1936, starting a music publishing company in the 1930s, playing with Django Reinhardt in 1946 in Reinhardt's first US visit, having a Harry Volpe Epiphone guitar introduced in 1955, and having a long career writing guitar instruction books.

== Biography ==
Volpe was born in Grotte, Sicily March 27, 1906 after the death of his older brother of the same first name and began his musical career on clarinet, but switched to guitar at the age of 8. He would join his father, a talented accordion player, and grandfathers to serenade neighbors. At 14, he emigrated with his father to New York City, and following a bout of tuberculosis, was teaching in Manny's Music Studio at the age of 15 and playing banjo in a Barber Shop trio. By 1922, he was on the RKO circuit and in 1924 he joined the Ted Navarre band where he remained until 1932. In 1932 he was selected as the first guitarist of the Radio City Music Hall orchestra. In 1936, Volpe recorded duets with Frank Victor on the Decca label, was involved in the introduction of the Gretsch Synchromatic 400, and opened Volpe's Guitar Center which he operated until 1941. From 1941 to 1944 he worked with Paramount and RCA.

In 1946, while on tour with Duke Ellington in the US, Django Reinhardt visited and played with Harry Volpe. From the late 1940s into the early 1950s, Volpe continued living and performing in New York, but a separation from his wife and resulting legal issues prompted a move to southeast Florida in 1954. Until his death, Volpe continued to play and teach in the Miami-Dade area.

=== Singles ===
Song	Other Musicians	Recording date	Label
Swingin' the Scale	Frank Victor	July 20, 1936	Decca
Easy Like	Frank Victor	July 20, 1936	Decca
Pagan Fantasy	Frank Victor	July 20, 1936	Decca
Sweet Strings	Frank Victor	July 20, 1936	Decca

== Discography ==
- Around the World with Harry Volpe (1965)
- World Famous Guitarist (1987)
