= Turn Me Loose (Fabian song) =

Single by Fabian Forte
- B-side: "Stop Thief"
- Released: 30 March 1959
- Recorded: 1959
- Genre: Rock and roll
- Label: Chancellor Records
- Songwriters: Doc Pomus; Mort Shuman

Fabian Forte singles chronology
| ""I'm a Man/Hypnotised"" | "Turn Me Loose" | ""Tiger"/"Mighty Cold"" |

"Turn Me Loose" is a song written by Doc Pomus and partner, Mort Shuman, upon the request of the managers of teen idol, Fabian Forte. The song became Fabian's first hit record, reaching number nine in the Billboard Hot 100 chart in 1959.

Variety called it "a typical rocking item which this young singer knows how to belt for maximum effectiveness."

== Other Versions ==
- Cliff Richard and The Drifters did a live version on the 30 May 1959 episode of Oh Boy!, which was long remembered. Excerpts were often rebroadcast, in many retrospectives of Richard's career, and at the close of the episode of the 1985 series The Rock 'n' Roll Years covering 1959. The full performance was released on Richard's 1997 box set.
- It was recorded 1973 by David Essex for his début album Rock On.
