= Fabian Forte =

American singer and actor (born 1943)

Fabian
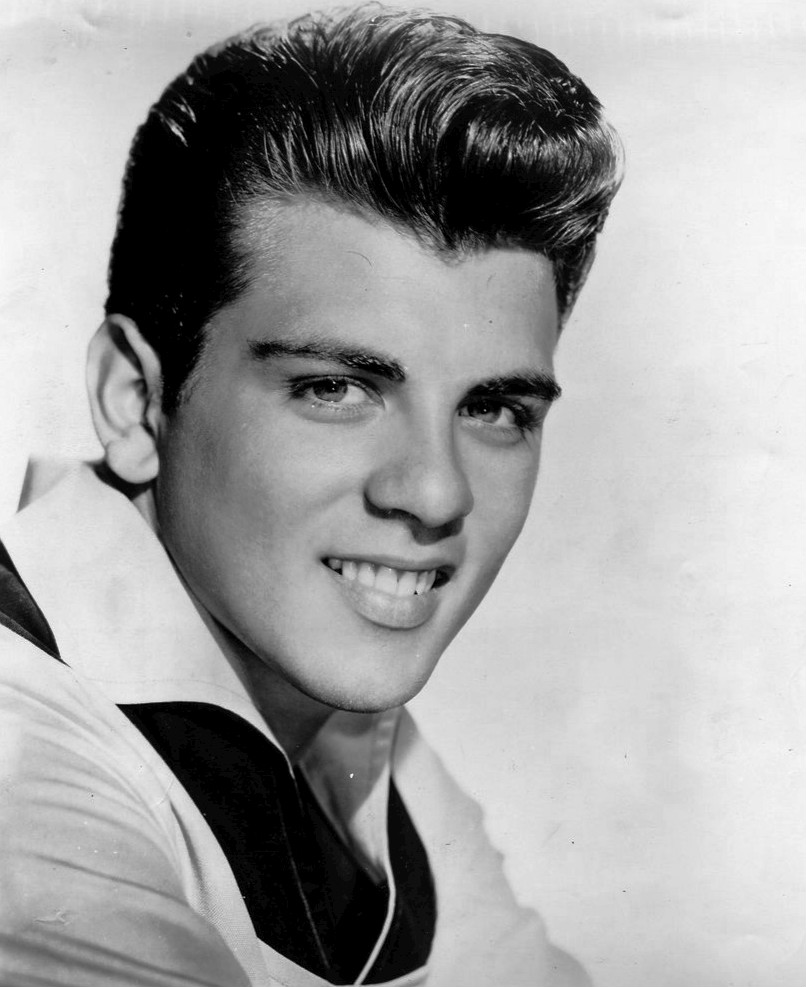
- Fabian in 1959

Background information
- Born: Fabian Anthony Forte; February 6, 1943 (age 83); Philadelphia, Pennsylvania, U.S.
- Genres: Rock and roll; pop; doo-wop
- Occupations: Singer, actor
- Spouses: Kathleen Regan (m. 1966; div. 1979); Kate Netter (m. 1980; div. 1990); Andrea Patrick (m. 1998)
- Website: fabianforte.net

Fabian Anthony Forte (born February 6, 1943), professionally known as Fabian, is an American singer and actor. He became a teen idol in the late 1950s.

== Early life ==
Fabian Forte was born on February 6, 1943, in Philadelphia, Pennsylvania. Born to Italian-American parents, he is the son of Josephine and Dominic Forte. His father was a police officer.

== Music career ==
=== Early career ===
Talent manager Bob Marcucci was a friend of Fabian's next-door neighbor. One day, Fabian's father had a heart attack, and, while he was being taken away in an ambulance, Marcucci spotted Fabian. Fabian later recalled, "He kept staring at me and looking at me. I had a crew cut, but this was the day of Rick Nelson and Elvis. He comes up and says to me, 'So if you're ever interested in the rock and roll business...' and hands me his card. I looked at the guy like he was out of his mind. I told him, 'Leave me alone. I'm worried about my dad.'"

When Fabian's father returned from the hospital, he was unable to work. When Marcucci persisted in his recruitment efforts, Fabian and his family were amenable to them, and he agreed to record a single. Frankie Avalon, also of South Philadelphia, suggested Fabian as a possibility. Fabian later said, "They gave me a pompadour and some clothes and those goddamned white bucks and out I went." "He was the right look and right for what we were going for", wrote Marcucci later.

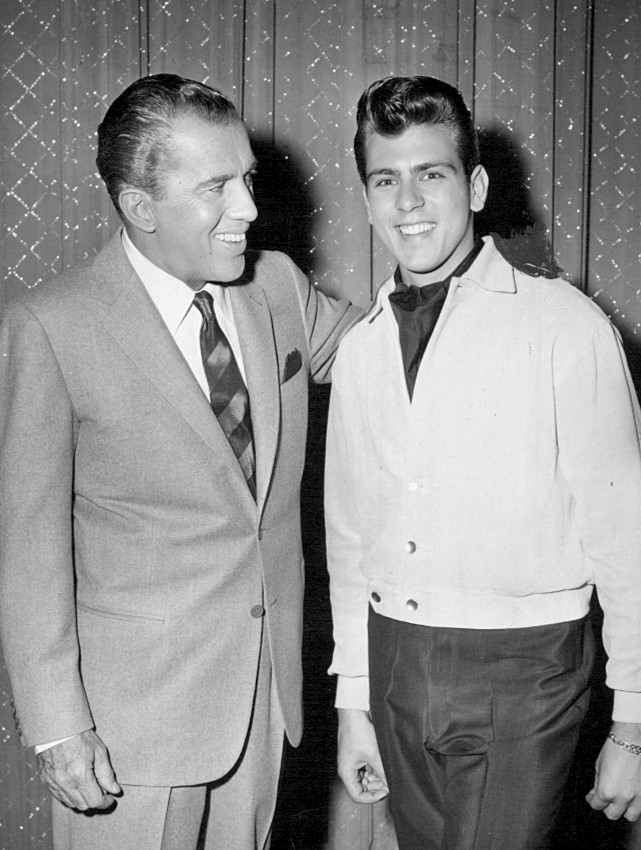
Fabian as a guest on the Ed Sullivan Show, 1959

Fabian was given an allowance from the record company of $30 a week (equivalent to $344 in 2025). He also kept working part-time at a pharmacy as well as studying at South Philadelphia High School, while practicing his singing. Fabian later said "I didn't know what I was doing, but I knew my goal, to try to make extra money. That meant a lot to our family. I rehearsed and rehearsed, and I really felt like a fish out of water. And we made a record. And it was horrible. Yet it got on Georgie Woods. For some reason, Georgie Woods played it."

The song was "Shivers", which was a local hit in Chicago. This helped Fabian meet Dick Clark, who agreed to try Fabian at one of Clark's record hops, where singers would perform to teenage audiences. Fabian lip synched to a song and Clark wrote "the little girls at the hop went wild. They started screaming and yelling for this guy who didn't do a thing but stand there. I've never seen anything like it." Clark told Marcucci "you got a hit, he's a star. Now all you have to do is teach him to sing."

Clark eventually put the young singer on American Bandstand where he sang "I'm in Love". Fabian later admitted this song "was not very good either" but "the response – they told me – was overwhelming. I had no idea. All during that period, I was doing record hops. Not getting paid for it, but for the record company promotions. Just lip synching to my records. The response was really good."

When he was 15 years of age, Fabian received a Silver Award as "The Promising Male Vocalist of 1958".

Marcucci gave a song written by Mort Shuman and Doc Pomus to Fabian. The song, entitled "I'm a Man" (not the Bo Diddley hit), was one that Fabian "liked a lot and was very comfortable with. It was giving me more experience, but I still felt like a fish out of water." Pomus' biographer later wrote Fabian's "labored reading of a macho lyric lent him a vulnerability that couldn't have been missed by his pubescent fans."

=== Commercial peak ===
Marcucci heavily promoted Fabian's next single, "Turn Me Loose", which was released in 1959. Marcucci used a series of advertisements saying "Fabian Is Coming", "Who is Fabian?", and finally "Fabian is Here". The promotional efforts worked; "Turn Me Loose" reached the Top Ten, peaking at number 9.

"Turn Me Loose" was followed by "Hound Dog Man", (US number 9; UK number 46), and his biggest hit, "Tiger", which reached number 3 on the US chart. It sold over one million copies, and was awarded a gold disc by the RIAA.

A review in Variety of a concert featuring Fabian in early 1959 declared the singer "was undoubtedly the standout of the show, who floors the kids with his gyrations and groans of “Hard Headed Woman,” “I'm a Man,” “Turn Me Loose” and, for an encore, “Stop Thief”."

Other Fabian singles that charted included "String Along", "About This Thing Called Love" (written by a man who went on a crime spree) and "This Friendly World", which reached number 12 on the US chart. His first album, Hold That Tiger reached the top 15 within two weeks. The song "Think of Me", although it did not chart in the US, was a big hit in some Asian countries including Sri Lanka in 1964. A review of Hold That Tiger in Variety stated, "Fabian is a hardbelting rocking singer who has the faculty of projecting his emotions. Fabian's voice is only adequate but be delivers with a beat that is undeniably commercial. Fine backing by combo and chorus lend an important assist."

In October 1959, he toured five major cities in Australia including several concerts in Sydney that were turned into the Australian film, Rock 'n' Roll. Due to a contractual dispute, however, his appearance was quickly removed from the film. That same year, Fabian told a judge he was earning $250,000 a year (equivalent to $2,761,000 in 2025) though an earlier report put this at $137,000. He kept up his studies and graduated from high school in June 1960.

Fabian earned gold records for "Tiger" and "Turn Me Loose", as well as a gold album for "The Fabulous Fabian". By the time he was 18 years of age, 11 of his singles had charted on the Billboard Top 100.

Marcucci admitted to punching Fabian on one occasion when the singer sat in the aisle of a movie theater, not in the middle of the row like Marcucci had asked; Fabian was spotted by a teenage fan who screamed. Marcucci was angry that he did not see the film and hit the singer.

During the payola scandal of the 1960s, Fabian testified before Congress that his recordings had been doctored electronically to "significantly improve his voice".

Fabian bought out his contract with Marcucci for $65,000. This was announced in July 1963. Also in 1963, he signed a contract with Dot Records.

Fabian later said in 1971 that "I must say I never knew [Marcucci] to cheat me out of any money due me and he never promised me anything he didn't deliver." He stated he left his manager because "all the songs were sounding the same. So I bought myself out of the contract. It cost me plenty – a lot more than I thought it would."

=== Later career ===
In 1973, Fabian began singing again. To raise his profile, he posed nude for Playgirl magazine. "I knew it was a mistake the minute I saw the thing sold in a paper bag. I could barely live with myself."

In January 1974, he started an act at the MGM-Grand in Las Vegas. He was managed at this stage by Allan Carr. In March 1974, he performed at the Blue Max of the Hyatt Regency O'Hare in Chicago. A review said "he seems rather lost in the act he was putting on... he's giving it the old beach party try. But all that, unfortunately, can't distract for long from the basic lack of talent." In October 1974, Carr – by then no longer his manager – said that Fabian was "a sensational lounge act in Nevada and shouldn't play anywhere else except on prom nights. He's not a middle of the road act in a middle of the road room. At the 12.30 am show at the Blue Max, when the conventioneers had had a few drinks it was terrific... This boy probably made $18,000 last year; this year he'll make about $270,000."

Fabian often performed in Las Vegas in the mid-1970s until he fell into difficulties with the authorities after attacking a Las Vegas district attorney and resultant bankruptcy.

Fabian retired once more in 1977 but resumed performing in 1981.

=== Discography ===
==== Studio albums ====
Title	Album details	Peak chart positions
Title	Album details	US
Hold That Tiger!	Released: August 1959; Label: Chancellor (CHL-5003); Formats: LP	11
The Fabulous Fabian	Released: December 1959; Label: Chancellor (CHL-5005); Formats: LP	12
Good Old Summertime	Released: June 1960; Label: Chancellor (CHL-5012); Formats: LP	—
The Fabian Album	Released: October 1960; Label: Chancellor (CHL-5013); Formats: LP	—
Sing Frankie! Rock Fabian! (with Frankie Avalon)	Released: 1961; Label: Chancellor (CHL-5015); Formats: LP	—
Young and Wonderful	Released: 1961; Label: Chancellor (CHL-5016); Formats: LP	—
Rockin' Hot	Released: 1961; Label: Chancellor (CHL-5019); Formats: LP	—
Fabulously Grateful	Released: November 1961; Label: Chancellor (CHL-5021); Formats: LP	—
"—" denotes a recording that did not chart or was not released in that territory.

==== Compilation albums ====
Title	Album details	Peak chart positions
Title	Album details	US
Fabian's 16 Fabulous Hits	Released: 1962; Label: Chancellor (CHL-5024); Formats: LP	—
"—" denotes a recording that did not chart or was not released in that territory.

==== Singles ====
Title	Year	Peak chart positions			Certifications	Album
Title	Year	US	US R&B	UK	Certifications	Album
"Shivers"	1958	—	—	—		Non-album single
"Lilly Lou"	1958	—	—	—		Non-album single
"I'm a Man"	1959	31	—	—		Hold That Tiger!
"Turn Me Loose"	1959	9	—	—		The Fabulous Fabian
"Tiger"	1959	3	15	8	RIAA: Gold	The Fabulous Fabian
"Come On and Get Me"	1959	29	—	—		The Fabulous Fabian
"Got the Feeling"	1959	54	—	—		The Fabulous Fabian
"Hound Dog Man"	1959	9	—	46		The Fabian Album
"This Friendly World" (Note: "This Friendly World" is noted for being performed by entertainer Andy Kaufman. In the biopic Man on the Moon, "This Friendly World" was performed during Kaufman's funeral by Jim Carrey. A different version by Carrey and Michael Stipe appears on the film's soundtrack.)	1959	12	—	—		The Fabian Album
"String Along"	1960	39	—	—		The Fabian Album
"About This Thing Called Love"	1960	31	—	—		The Fabian Album
"Don't Play Nice"	1960	—	—	—		Non-album single
"King of Love"	1960	—	—	—		Non-album single
"Kissin' and Twistin'"	1960	91	—	—		Rockin' Hot
"Grapevine"	1961	—	—	—		Rockin' Hot
"A Girl Like You"	1961	—	—	—		Non-album single
"Wild Party"	1961	—	—	—		Non-album single
"The Darlin' Girls"	1962	—	—	—		Non-album single
"Break Down and Cry"	1962	—	—	—		Non-album single
"I'm Gonna Be Flirty"	1962	—	—	—		Non-album single
"The Music Died"	1963	—	—	—		Non-album single
"Squeeze Her-Tease Her"	1964	—	—	—		Non-album single
"The King of the Castle"	1964	—	—	—		Non-album single
"Settle Down"	1964	—	—	—		Non-album single
"Got You on My Mind"	1965	—	—	—		Non-album single
"Stop, Look and Listen"	1965	—	—	—		Non-album single
"Hold On"	1967	—	—	—		Non-album single
"Go on, In"	1968	—	—	—		Non-album single
"We Gotta Get Hurt"	1969	—	—	—		Non-album single
"Country Girl"	1970	—	—	—		Non-album single
"—" denotes a recording that did not chart or was not released in that territory.

== Acting career ==
20th Century-Fox had enjoyed success casting teen idol pop stars in movies, such as Elvis Presley and Pat Boone. They decided to do the same thing with Fabian and signed him to a long-term contract. His first leading role was Hound-Dog Man (1959), based on the novel by Fred Gipson (who had written Old Yeller) and directed by Don Siegel. He co-starred with the more experienced Stuart Whitman and sang several songs, including the title track. The Psychotronic Encyclopedia of Film featured a photo of Fabian's screen test where he appeared in the same outfit that Elvis Presley wore in Fox's Love Me Tender. "Acting came natural to me. I don't know why", Fabian later said.

Fabian's recording of the Hound Dog Man title song was a top-ten hit, but the film was not a financial success – in contrast to Presley's and Boone's first films. The studio, however, tried again in two smaller roles, supporting a bigger star – High Time, with Bing Crosby, and North to Alaska, with John Wayne. Both films were popular, especially the latter, and, in November 1960, his contract with the studio was amended with an increase in salary – it was now a seven-year deal with an option for two films a year. He later said that "acting wasn't like the singing, because it was very private – quiet on the set. No screaming [teenage fans]. It was a wonderful experience. I got to meet and work with John Wayne, Jimmy Stewart, and Peter Lorre. Elvis came over to meet me when I was on the lot. Marilyn Monroe, Natalie Wood and Gary Cooper were also on the lot. I was on the plane with Marlon Brando for eight hours coming back from Tahiti."

The Fox contract included television series as well as films. Fabian was cast by director Robert Altman as a psychotic killer in "A Lion Walks Among Us", an episode of the television series Bus Stop. This episode was highly controversial due to its violent content, with many affiliates refusing to run the program, so much so that it even was mentioned in the U.S. Senate. However, the series was good for Fabian's acting career, and saw him regarded with more respect. He later said that he regarded this as his best performance.

Paramount borrowed him from Fox to co-star with teen idol Tommy Sands in Love in a Goldfish Bowl (1961). In 1961, Bob Marcucci announced that Fabian and Avalon would star in Virginia Ridge by Clarence Fillmore about the Battle of New Market, where Virginia Military cadets took on Union soldiers. The movie was never made. In April 1961, Fox announced Fabian would star in Blue Denim Baby and Bachelor Flat; the former was never made, and the latter starred Richard Beymer in his stead.

Instead Fabian co-starred opposite Tuesday Weld in an episode of The Dick Powell Show, titled "Run Till It's Dark". In Mr. Hobbs Takes a Vacation (1962), he romanced (and sang with) the daughter of a family man played by James Stewart; this was a big hit. So too was The Longest Day (1962), Fox's all-star epic about the D-Day landings; Fabian appeared among a number of other teen idols as U.S. Rangers. Less popular, though still widely seen, was Five Weeks in a Balloon (1962), Irwin Allen's take on Jules Verne; Fabian sang one song but, again, it was a supporting role.

In August 1961, Fabian had to go to court to get his contract with Fox approved. It was for six years, covering nine films for a gross sum of $545,000. Fabian was linked with some films that were not made including adaptations of The Beardless Warriors and A Summer World.

He performed in John Loves Mary in summer stock in 1962.

In October 1962, Fabian changed management to Jack Spina, who managed Pat Boone.

When Fox temporarily shut down following cost overruns on Cleopatra, Fabian was one of the first actors whose options were exercised after the studio re-opened. He was to have supported Stewart again in Take Her, She's Mine (1963) but did not appear in the final film. Samuel Z. Arkoff of American International Pictures said he wanted Fabian to play the lead in Beach Party (1963) but was unable to do it because of his Fox contract. Filmink argued the film might not have been as successful with Fabian in it.

Fabian had not become a film star but was in demand as an actor, appearing in episodes of series like The Virginian, Wagon Train, The Greatest Show on Earth and The Eleventh Hour. Variety described his performance in Wagon Train as "most effective".

In November 1965, Fabian signed a seven-picture deal with American International Pictures (AIP). His first film for the company was alongside Beach Party stars Frankie Avalon and Annette Funicello in the 1966 stock car racing film Fireball 500. AIP then sent him to Italy to play a role originally intended for Avalon in Dr. Goldfoot and the Girl Bombs (1966), supporting Vincent Price and directed by Mario Bava. Back in the United States, he made another stock car racing film for AIP, Thunder Alley (1967), opposite Funicello and directed by Richard Rush. His fourth movie for AIP was Maryjane (1968), where Fabian played a school teacher fighting the evils of the marijuana trade.

Fabian returned to racing car dramas with The Wild Racers (1968), partly financed by Roger Corman and shot in Europe. This was not a big hit on release but has developed a cult following; Quentin Tarantino described it as his favorite racing car movie.

From June 1969 onwards, he was billed as "Fabian Forte".

Fabian appeared in a 1982 television commercial for The Idols of Rock n' Roll and in the documentary film The Bituminous Coal Queens of Pennsylvania (2005). In the 1980s, he developed some sitcoms for television.

On January 8, 2002, Forte was awarded a star on the Hollywood Walk of Fame.

As of 2020, Fabian had appeared in 30 films.

== Personal life ==
Fabian was drafted, but rejected, for military service during the Vietnam War. According to USMC Lt. Col. Arthur Eppley, he was declared 4F (unfit for service).

Due to the pressures of his career and home life, Fabian started drinking in the 1960s.

In 1982, Fabian was arrested for reportedly sticking his cigarette into a passenger who asked him to put out the cigarette in a non-smoking section of an aircraft. The passenger turned out to be a district attorney, but ultimately no charges were brought.

=== Race car accident ===
In 1978, Fabian was participating in a charity racing event in Watkins Glen, New York. He was practicing at Willow Springs International Motorsports Park under the instruction of professional driver Bill Simpson when he rolled his car and suffered minor cuts and bruises.

In 1982, a jury found him 40% liable for the accident (Fabian testified that Simpson repeatedly urged him to drive faster while Simpson testified that Fabian suddenly accelerated wildly in spite of his orders to slow down). He received $32,000 in an out-of-court settlement (equivalent to $107,000 in 2025).

=== The Idolmaker lawsuit ===
The film The Idolmaker (1980), written by Edward Di Lorenzo and directed by Taylor Hackford, was a thinly disguised biography of Fabian (called Caesare in the film), as well as songwriter/producer Marcucci (called Vinnie Vacarri) and Frankie Avalon (called Tommy Dee). In the movie version, singer Caesare—a pretty boy with little singing talent—goes through a whirlwind of success in a short time. In a fit of pique, he abruptly fires his songwriters and quits his record label. The real-life Fabian launched a $64 million lawsuit at the time of the picture's release, claiming the film made him look like "a totally manufactured singer, a mere pretty face without any singing ability or acting talent". The filmmakers insisted that the movie presented only fictional characters (although Marcucci was a paid consultant on the film). Fabian claimed they settled out of court, where he and his wife received apologies and Marcucci's 7.5% ownership of the film passed to Fabian.

=== Marriages ===
Fabian has been married three times. His first marriage was to model Kathleen Regan in September 1966. They had two children together, Christian and Julie, before separating in June 1975. In October 1975, when Fabian and Regan were estranged, he was arrested after an argument with her and her mother. He was accused of hitting them. He was put on probation for two years. The couple divorced in 1979. Fabian has blamed himself for the divorce.

He married Kate Netter in 1980; they divorced in 1990.

In 1998, he married Andrea Patrick, a former Bituminous Coal Queen and Miss Pennsylvania USA. He and Andrea were later sued for unpaid bills by the resort where they were married.

Fabian relocated from Los Angeles to southwestern Pennsylvania, to be closer to his wife's family; he and his wife were sued by the builder of their house, also for unpaid bills. They live on 20 acres (8.1 ha) in Dunbar in a home that his wife designed. In 2013, he said he played "25 shows a year. It gets me out of the house ... I've never been happier. [At home] I ride my ATV and tractor and cut the grass. Where I grew up, there wasn't any grass."

== See also ==
- Mononymous persons
- History of the Italian Americans in Philadelphia
