= Hemant =

- Pronunciation: /ˈhɛmənt/ HEM-ənt; Hindi pronunciation: [ˈɦeːmənt]
- Gender: Male

Other gender
- Feminine: Haimanti

Origin
- Language: Sanskrit
- Origin: Indo-Aryan
- Meaning: namesake of Hemanta, one of the six Indian ecological seasons.
- Region of origin: Indian subcontinent

Other names
- Variant forms: Hemanta, Hemanth, Hemantha
- Related names: Basant, Grishma, Varsha, Sharad, Shishir

Hemant, (Sanskrit: हेमन्त, romanized: Hemanta) is an Indian male given name. It is the namesake of Hemanta, one of the six Indian ecological seasons—Ritu—in the northern half of the Indian subcontinent, which runs in early winter approximately from November to December. The female version of the name is Haimanti.

Notable people named Hemant include:

- Hemant Bhagwani
- Hemant Birje (born 1965), Indian actor
- Hemant Brijwasi, Indian singer
- Hemant Chaturvedi, Indian cinematographer
- Hemant Chauhan, Gujarati writer and singer specializing in religious and folk songs
- Hemant Choudhary, Indian actor
- Hemant Dhome, Indian politician
- Hemant Divate, Marathi poet, translator and publisher
- Hemant Godse, Indian politician
- Hemant Gokhale
- Hemant Goswami (born 1971), Indian social activist
- Hemant Gupta
- Hemant Gurung, (born 1958), Bhutanese politician
- Hemant Joshi, Indian professor of Mass Communication and Journalism
- Hemant Joshi (politician), Indian politician
- Hemant Kanitkar (born 1942), Indian former cricketer who played in 2 Tests in 1974
- Hemant Kanoria
- Hemant Karkare (1954–2008), former chief of the Mumbai Anti-Terrorist Squad
- Hemant Katare
- Hemant Khandelwal
- Hemant Khava
- Hemant Kher
- Hemant Kinikar
- Hemant Kumar (1920–1989), Indian musician and singer
- Hemant Lakhani (1935–2013), British Indian convicted for an illegal arms deal
- Hemant Lall
- Hemant Madhukar, Indian film director and producer
- Hemant Mahaur
- Hemant Meena, Indian politician
- Hemant Mehta, Indian-American blogger and author
- Hemant Mishra, Indian actor
- Hemant Ogale
- Hemant Pandey, Indian actor and comedian
- Hemant Patil, Indian politician
- Hemant Rao, Indian artist
- Hemant Rasane
- Hemant Savara, Indian politician
- Hemant Sharma, Nepalese singer
- Hemant Shesh (born 1952), Hindi writer, poet and former Indian civil servant
- Hemant Singh (born 1951), the present titular Maharaja Rana of Dholpur
- Hemant Singh (cricketer), Indian cricketer
- Hemant Soren, Indian politician
- Hemant Talwalkar, Indian cricketer
- Hemant Taneja
