= Mayoral elections in Fort Wayne, Indiana =

Elections are held in Fort Wayne, Indiana to elect the city's mayor. Currently, such elections are scheduled to be held every four years, in the year immediately preceding that of United States presidential elections.

== 1987 ==
1987 Fort Wayne mayoral election
- November 3, 1987
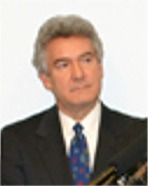

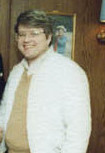
Nominee	Paul Helmke	Winfield Moses
Party	Republican	Democratic
Popular vote	26,194	24,179
Percentage	52.00%	48.00%
Mayor before election
Winfield Moses
Democratic
Elected mayor
Paul Helmke
Republican

The 1987 Fort Wayne mayoral election was held on November 3, 1987, to elect the mayor of Fort Wayne, Indiana, United States. It saw the election of Republican Paul Helmke, who unseated Democratic incumbent Winfield Moses.

1987 Fort Wayne mayoral election
Party	Candidate	Votes	%
Republican	Paul Helmke	26,194	52.00
Democratic	Winfield Moses (incumbent)	24,179	48.00
Total votes		50,373	100

== 1991 ==
1991 Fort Wayne mayoral election
- November 5, 1991
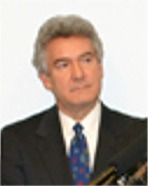

Nominee	Paul Helmke	Charlie Belch
Party	Republican	Democratic
Popular vote	21,415	14,766
Percentage	59.19%	40.81%
Mayor before election
Paul Helmke
Republican
Elected mayor
Paul Helmke
Republican

The 1991 Fort Wayne mayoral election was held on November 5, 1991, to elect the mayor of Fort Wayne, Indiana, United States. It saw the reelection of Republican incumbent Paul Helmke.

1991 Fort Wayne mayoral election
Party	Candidate	Votes	%
Republican	Paul Helmke (incumbent)	21,415	59.19
Democratic	Charlie Belch	14,766	40.81
Total votes		36,181	100

== 1995 ==
1995 Fort Wayne mayoral election
- November 7, 1995
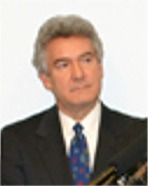

Nominee	Paul Helmke	Thomas Essex
Party	Republican	Democratic
Popular vote	21,909	11,033
Percentage	64.49%	32.48%
Mayor before election
Paul Helmke
Republican
Elected mayor
Paul Helmke
Republican

The 1995 Fort Wayne mayoral election was held on November 7, 1995, to elect the mayor of Fort Wayne, Indiana, United States. It saw the reelection of Republican incumbent Paul Helmke. As of 2023, this is the last time a Republican was elected mayor of Fort Wayne.

=== Nominations ===
==== Democratic primary ====
Wayne Township Trustee Thomas Essex won the Democratic primary with 4,056 votes.

==== Republican primary ====
Some Republicans speculated that Helmke, who had ties to the Clinton administration, might have been endangered in his primary. However, he handily won his primary with 75% of the vote (7,717 votes).

==== Libertarian nomination ====
Libertarians nominated William Kempf.

=== General election ===
The race was projected by Howey Political Report to be "safe Republican", with Helmke anticipated to be easily reelected.

1995 Fort Wayne mayoral election
Party	Candidate	Votes	%
Republican	Paul Helmke (incumbent)	21,909	64.49
Democratic	Thomas Essex	11,033	32.48
Libertarian	William Kempf	1,029	3.03
Total votes		33,971	100

== 1999 ==
1999 Fort Wayne mayoral election
- November 2, 1999
- Turnout: 34%
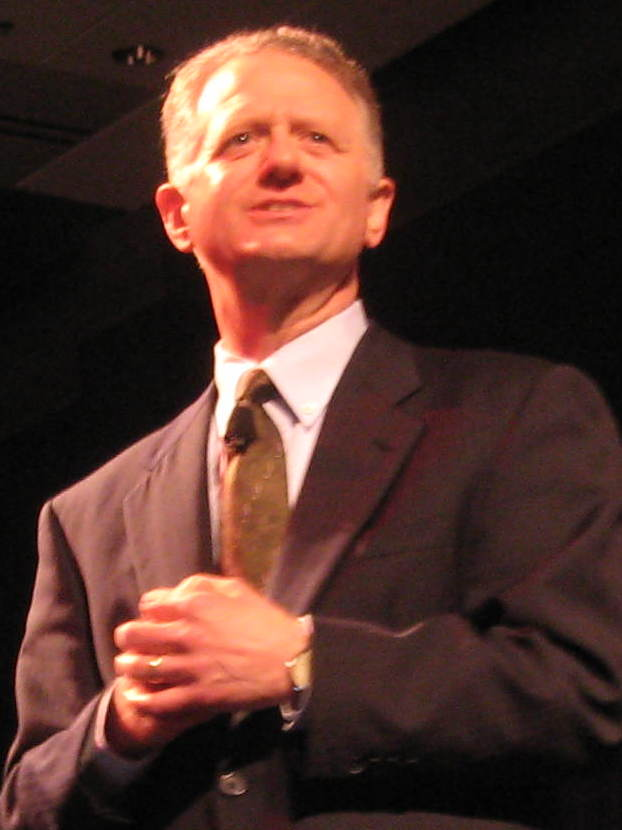

Nominee	Graham Richard	Linda Buskirk
Party	Democratic	Republican
Popular vote	21,607	21,531
Percentage	50.07%	49.89%
Mayor before election
Paul Helmke
Republican
Elected mayor
Graham Richard
Democratic

The 1999 Fort Wayne mayoral election was held on November 2, 1999, to elect the mayor of Fort Wayne, Indiana, United States. It saw the election of Democrat Graham Richard, who defeated Republican Linda Buskirk by a narrow margin.

=== Nominations ===
==== Democratic primary ====
Running for the Democratic nomination were Graham Richard, Agnes Hopkins, and David Roach.

1999 Fort Wayne Democratic mayoral primary
Party	Candidate	Votes	%
Democratic	Graham Richard	5,568	79.13
Democratic	Agnes Fitzgerald Hopkins	940	13.36
Democratic	Dave "Fort Wayne's Most Wanted" Roach	529	7.52
Total votes		7,037	100

==== Republican primary ====
Running for the Republican nomination were Linda Buskirk and Allen County Sheriff Joe Squadrito. While he had been seen as a frontrunner, Squadrito ultimately lost the primary to Buskirk.

1999 Fort Wayne Republican mayoral primary
Party	Candidate	Votes	%
Republican	Linda Buskirk	9,540	52.10
Republican	Joseph Martin Squadrito	8,772	47.90
Total votes		18,312	100

==== Independent candidates ====
Independent candidates Sherri Emerson and William B. Dinkins also ran.

=== General election ===
1999 Fort Wayne mayoral election
Party	Candidate	Votes	%
Democratic	Graham Richard	21,607	50.07
Republican	Linda Buskirk	21,531	49.89
Independent	Sherri Emerson	14	0.03
Independent	William B. Dinkins	3	0.01
Turnout		43,155	34

== 2003 ==
2003 Fort Wayne mayoral election
- November 4, 2003
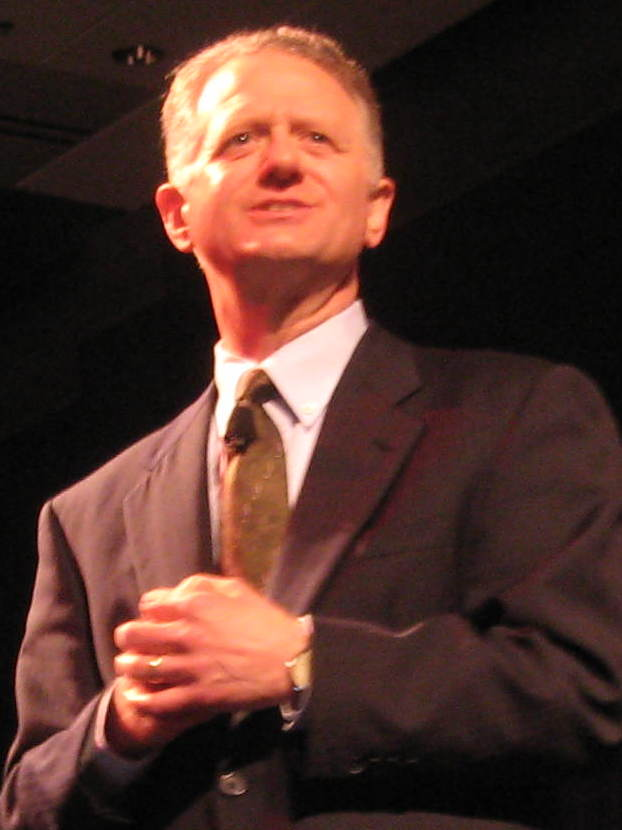

Nominee	Graham Richard	Linda Buskirk
Party	Democratic	Republican
Popular vote	27,279	19,717
Percentage	58.00%	41.92%
Mayor before election
Graham Richard
Democratic
Elected mayor
Graham Richard
Democratic

The 2003 Fort Wayne mayoral election was held on November 4 to elect the mayor of Fort Wayne, Indiana, US. It saw the reelection of Democratic incumbent Graham Richard, who again defeated Republican Linda Buskirk in what was a rematch of the 1999 election.

=== Nominations ===
Primary elections were held May 8.

During its primaries, the voter turnout in Allen County, in which Fort Wayne is located, was 11.9%.

==== Democratic primary ====
Democratic primary results
Party	Candidate	Votes	%
Democratic	Graham Richard (incumbent)	5,061	88.85
Democratic	Charles Eberhard	330	5.79
Democratic	Thomas Allen Schrader	167	2.93
Democratic	David Christopher "Papa" Roach	138	2.42
Total votes		5,696	100

==== Republican primary ====
Republican primary results
Party	Candidate	Votes	%
Republican	Linda Buskirk	8,233	88.26
Republican	O. "Bro" Blye	1,095	11.74
Total votes		9,328	100

=== General election ===
The election was projected as a "tossup". Despite the race having been projected to be close, Richard won a sizable victory over Buskirk.

During the general election, the voter turnout in Allen County, in which Fort Wayne is located, was 30.63%.

2003 was a good year for Democrats in Indiana's mayoral elections, with the party winning control of the mayoralties of all of the state's top seven most populous cities for the first time since 1959. The Democratic Party also won control of the mayoralties in twenty of the state's thirty cities with populations above 25,000. Additionally, in 2003, Democrats won more than 56% of partisan mayoral races in Indiana.

During the general election, Allen County, where Fort Wayne is located, saw voter turnout of 25% in its various elections.

2003 Fort Wayne mayoral election
Party	Candidate	Votes	%
Democratic	Graham Richard (incumbent)	27,279	58.00
Republican	Linda Buskirk	19,717	41.92
Write-in	Others	38	0.08
Total votes		47,031	100

== 2007 ==
2007 Fort Wayne mayoral election
- November 6, 2007
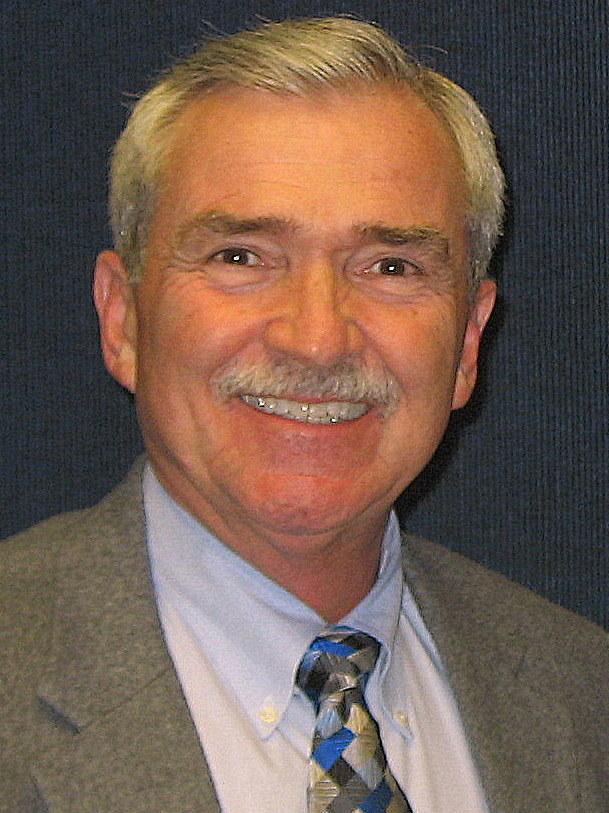

Nominee	Tom Henry	Matt Kelty
Party	Democratic	Republican
Popular vote	31,740	21,163
Percentage	60%	40%
Mayor before election
Graham Richard
Democratic
Elected mayor
Tom Henry
Democratic

The 2007 Fort Wayne mayoral election was held on November 6 to elect the mayor of Fort Wayne, Indiana, United States. It saw the election of Democrat Tom Henry.

Incumbent Mayor Graham Richard did not seek reelection to a third term.

=== Nominations ===
Primary elections were held May 8.

==== Democratic primary ====
2007 Fort Wayne Democratic mayoral primary
Party	Candidate	Votes	%
Democratic	Tom Henry	4,921	82.44
Democratic	Tom Cook	804	13.47
Democratic	Frederick F. Steinke	244	4.09
Total votes		5,969	100

==== Republican primary ====
2007 Fort Wayne Republican mayoral primary
Party	Candidate	Votes	%
Republican	Matt Kelty	9,123	50.29
Republican	Nelson Peters	8,465	46.66
Republican	Ivan R. Hood	328	1.81
Republican	Teresa L. Licari	115	0.63
Republican	Wilbert "Duke" Brown	111	0.61
Total votes		18,142	100

=== General election ===
In August, Kelty was indicted over perjury and campaign finance charges. While he denied wrongdoing, this story dominated the campaign.

During the general election, Allen County, where Fort Wayne is located, saw voter turnout of 21% in its various elections.

2007 Fort Wayne mayoral election
Party	Candidate	Votes	%
Democratic	Tom Henry	31,740	60.00
Republican	Matt Kelty	21,163	40.00
Total votes		52,903	100

=== Aftermath ===
In October 2008, Kelty pleaded guilty to several of the campaign finance charges brought against him.

Henry would go on to be reelected in 2011, 2015, and 2019.

== 2011 ==
2011 Fort Wayne mayoral election
- November 8, 2011
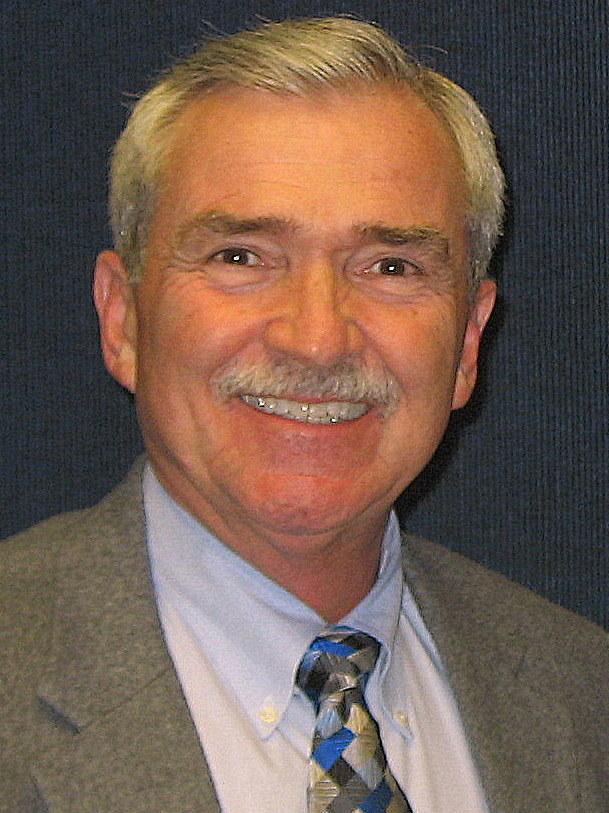

Nominee	Tom Henry	Paula Hughes
Party	Democratic	Republican
Popular vote	23,166	21,520
Percentage	49.85%	46.31%
Mayor before election
Tom Henry
Democratic
Elected mayor
Tom Henry
Democratic

The 2011 Fort Wayne mayoral election was held on November 8 to elect the mayor of Fort Wayne, Indiana, United States. It saw the reelection of Democrat Tom Henry.

=== Nominations ===
Primary elections were held May 3.

During the primary elections, the voter turnout in Allen County, in which Fort Wayne is located, was 12.78%.

==== Democratic primary ====
2011 Fort Wayne Democratic mayoral primary
Party	Candidate	Votes	%
Democratic	Tom Henry (incumbent)	4,391	85.96
Democratic	Tom Cook	346	6.77
Democratic	Charles Eberhard	159	3.11
Democratic	D. C. "Mr. Roachclip" Roach	116	2.27
Democratic	Frederick F. Steinke	96	1.88
Total votes		5,108	100

==== Republican primary ====
2011 Fort Wayne Republican mayoral primary
Party	Candidate	Votes	%
Republican	Paula Hughes	9,241	55.67
Republican	Liz Brown	4,188	25.23
Republican	Eric Doden	3,031	18.26
Republican	Wilbert "Duke" Brown	111	0.61
Republican	Terrence Richard Walker	79	0.48
Total votes		16,601	100

=== General election ===
During the general election, the voter turnout in Allen County, in which Fort Wayne is located, was 26.21%.

2011 Fort Wayne mayoral election
Party	Candidate	Votes	%
Democratic	Tom Henry (incumbent)	23,166	49.85
Republican	Paula Hughes	21,520	46.31
Independent	D. Haley Ahrend	1,782	3.83
Total votes		46,468	100

== 2015 ==
2015 Fort Wayne mayoral election
- November 3, 2015
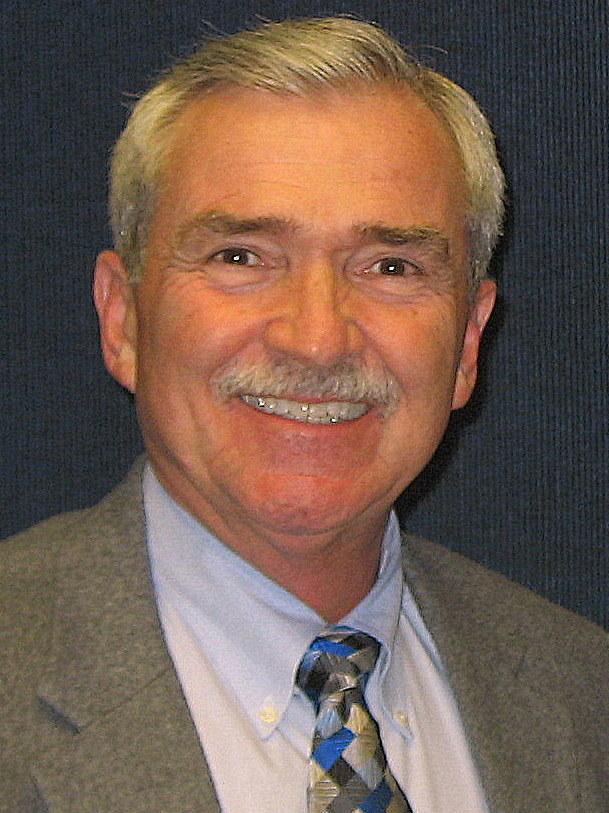

Nominee	Tom Henry	Mitch Harper
Party	Democratic	Republican
Popular vote	23,769	18,068
Percentage	56.81%	43.19%
Mayor before election
Tom Henry
Democratic
Elected mayor
Tom Henry
Democratic

The 2015 Fort Wayne mayoral election was held on November 3 to elect the mayor of Fort Wayne, Indiana, United States. It saw the reelection of Democrat Tom Henry to a third term.

=== Nominations ===
Primary elections were held May 5.

During the primary elections, the voter turnout in Allen County, in which Fort Wayne is located, was 9.82%.

==== Democratic primary ====
2015 Fort Wayne Democratic primary
Party	Candidate	Votes	%
Democratic	Tom Henry (incumbent)	5,676	76.51
Democratic	Richard "Rick" Stevenson Sr.	1,396	18.82
Democratic	Tom M. Cook	219	2.95
Democratic	David Christopher Roach	128	1.73
Total votes		7,419	100

==== Republican primary ====
2015 Fort Wayne Republican primary
Party	Candidate	Votes	%
Republican	Mitch Harper	8,475	83.68
Republican	William E. "Bill" Collins	705	6.96
Republican	Robert "Rob" Bastian	693	6.84
Republican	Frederick G. Osheskie Sr.	255	2.52
Total votes		10,128	100

=== General election ===
During the general election, the voter turnout in Allen County, in which Fort Wayne is located, was 22.49%.

2015 Fort Wayne mayoral election
Party	Candidate	Votes	%
Democratic	Tom Henry (incumbent)	23,769	56.81
Republican	Mitch Harper	18,068	43.19
Total votes		41,837	100

== 2019 ==
2019 Fort Wayne mayoral election
- November 5, 2019
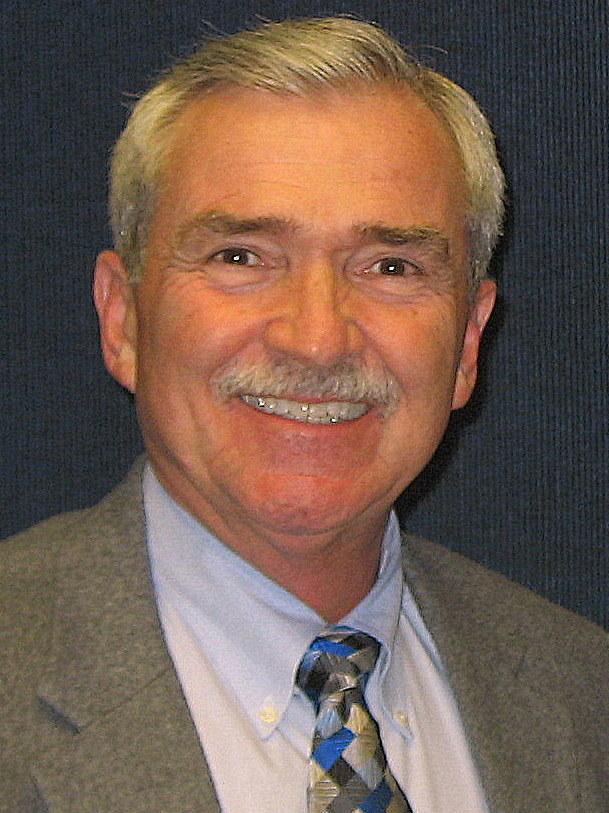

Nominee	Tom Henry	Tim Smith
Party	Democratic	Republican
Popular vote	32,571	20,643
Percentage	61.74%	38.26%
Mayor before election
Tom Henry
Democratic
Elected mayor
Tom Henry
Democratic

The 2019 Fort Wayne mayoral election was held on November 5 to elect the mayor of Fort Wayne, Indiana, United States. Incumbent Mayor Tom Henry was reelected to a fourth term.

=== Nominations ===
Primary elections were held May 7.

==== Democratic primary ====
Democratic primary results
Party	Candidate	Votes	%
Democratic	Tom Henry (incumbent)	6,797	86.17
Democratic	Gina M. Burgess	875	11.09
Democratic	Tommy A. Schrader	216	2.74
Total votes		7,888	100

==== Republican primary ====
2019 Fort Wayne Republican mayoral primary
Party	Candidate	Votes	%
Republican	Tim Smith	9,065	56.39
Republican	John Crawford	6,776	42.15
Republican	David Christopher Roach	235	1.46
Total votes		16,076	100

=== General election ===
Earlier in the campaign Henry was thought to be vulnerable, but the race ended up not being close. In his victory speech, Henry announced that this would be his last term as mayor, though he later decided to run for a fifth term against businessman Tim Didier for 2023. He was sworn in for his fourth term on January 1, 2020. His fourth term would expire on January 1, 2024.

2019 Fort Wayne mayoral election
Party	Candidate	Votes	%	±%
Democratic	Thomas C. Henry (incumbent)	32,571	61.21%	+4.40%
Republican	Timothy Smith	20,643	38.79%	−4.40%
Write-in				—
Turnout		53,214		
Majority		11,928	22.42%	100.00%
Democratic hold		Swing		

== 2023 ==
2023 Fort Wayne mayoral election
- November 7, 2023
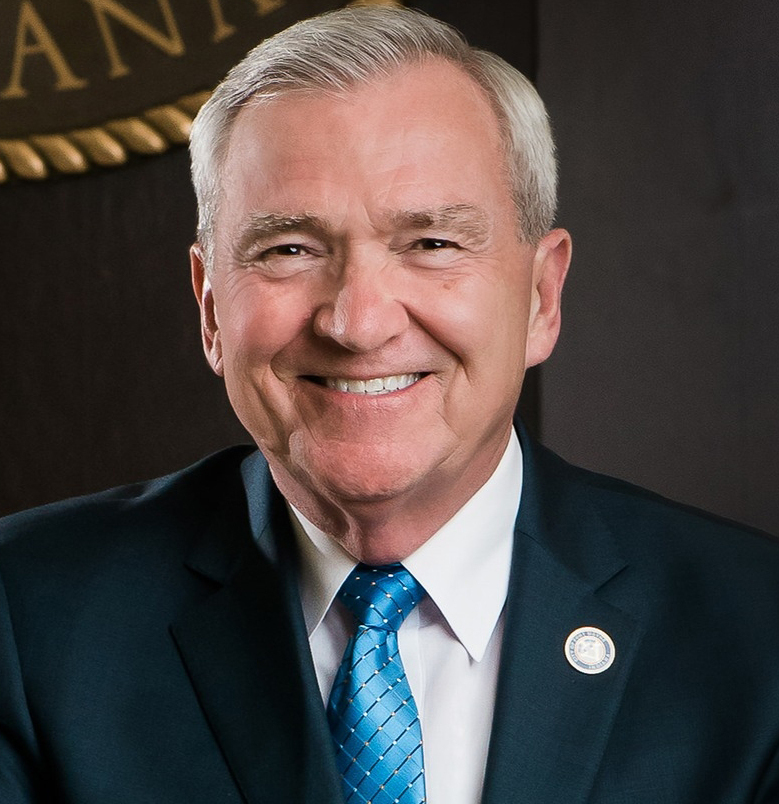

Nominee	Tom Henry	Thomas Didier
Party	Democratic	Republican
Popular vote	23,945	22,210
Percentage	51.88%	48.12%
Mayor before election
Tom Henry
Democratic
Elected mayor
Tom Henry
Democratic

The 2023 Fort Wayne mayoral election was held on November 5 to elect the mayor of Fort Wayne, Indiana, United States. Incumbent Mayor Tom Henry was reelected to a fifth term.

2023 Fort Wayne mayoral election
Party	Candidate	Votes	%	±%
Democratic	Thomas C. Henry (incumbent)	23,945	51.88%	−9.86%
Republican	Thomas Didier	22,210	48.12%	+9.86%
Write-in				—
Turnout		46,155	100.00%	
Majority		1,735	3.76%	100.00%
Democratic hold		Swing		
