= Hemanth =

Hemanth may refer to:

- Hemanth (singer), Indian playback singer
- Hemanth Jois, Indian composer
- Hemanth M. Rao, Indian film director
- Hemanth Menon (born 1989), Indian actor
- Hemanth Muddappa, Indian bike racer
- Hemanth Ravan, Indian actor
- Tanya Hemanth (born 2003), Indian badminton player
- Darshan (Kannada actor) (born Hemanth Kumar), Indian actor

== See also ==
- Hemant, an Indian male given name, including a list of people with the name
- Hemanta, a variation of the name Hemant, including a list of people with the name
- Hemantha, a variation of the name Hemant, including a list of people with the name
