= Hemantha =

Hemantha may refer to:

- Hemantha Boteju (born 1977), Sri Lankan cricketer
- Hemantha Devapriya (born 1958), Sri Lankan cricketer
- Hemantha Jayasena (born 1971), Sri Lankan cricketer
- Hemantha Wickramaratne (born 1971), Sri Lankan cricketer
- Dushan Hemantha (born 1994), Sri Lankan cricketer
- G. Hemantha Kumar (born 1959), Indian academician
- Mahesh Hemantha, Sri Lankan cricketer

== See also ==
- Hemant, an Indian male given name, including a list of people with the name.
- Hemanta, a variation of the name Hemant, including a list of people with the name.
- Hemanth, a variation of the name Hemant, including a list of people with the name.
