= Hemanta =

Hemanta may refer to:

- Hemanta (season), season of winter in the Hindu calendar
- Hemanta (film), a 2016 Bengali language film
- Hemanta Mukherjee metro station, a metro railway station in Kolkata, India

== People with the given name ==
- Hemanta Bag, Indian politician
- Hemanta Bahadur B.C., Nepalese politician
- Hemanta Dora, Indian football player
- Hemanta Dutta, Indian director and dramatist
- Hemanta Kalita, Indian politician
- Hemanta Kumar Jamatia, Indian singer
- Hemanta Kumar Sarkar (1897–1952), Indian author and publisher
- Hemanta Kumari Debi, Bengali zamindar
- Hemanta Mishra (born 1945), Nepalese wildlife conservator and author
- Hemanta Mukherjee, (1920–1989), Indian singer and music director, popularly known as "Hemant Kumar"
- Hemanta Mukhopadhyay, Indian singer
- Hemanta Rawal, Nepalese judge
- Hemanta Sena, ruler of the Sena dynasty 1070–1096
- Hemanta Vincent Biswas (born 1995), Bangladeshi footballer
- Shougrakpam Hemanta, (born 1969), Indian actor

== See also ==
- Hemant, an Indian male given name, including a list of people with the name
- Hemanth, a variation of the name Hemant, including a list of people with the name
- Hemantha, a variation of the name Hemant, including a list of people with the name
