= Paul Helmke =

American politician (born 1948)

W. Paul Helmke, Jr.
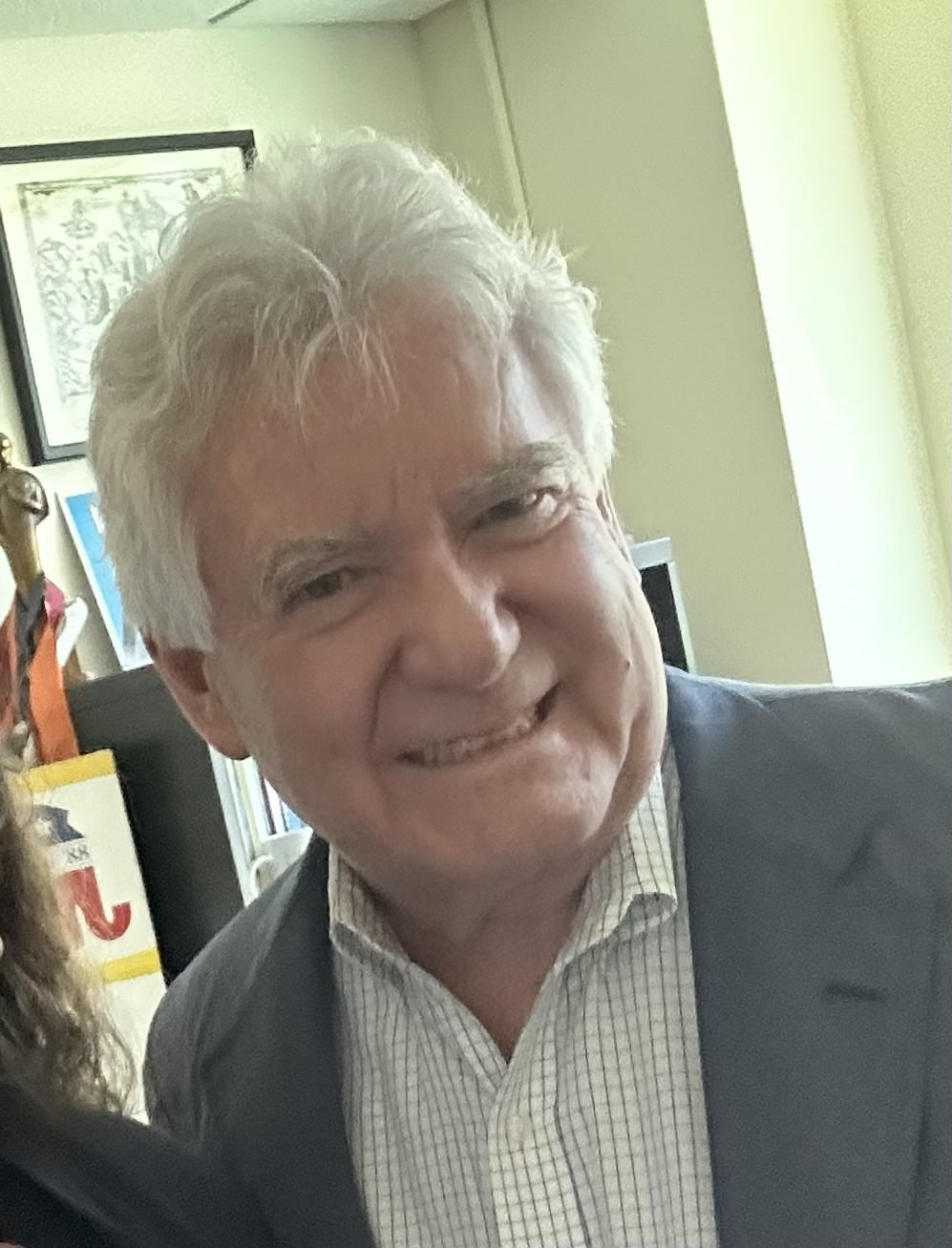

33rd Mayor of Fort Wayne
- In office January 1, 1988 – January 1, 2000
- Preceded by: Winfield Moses
- Succeeded by: Graham Richard

55th President of the United States Conference of Mayors
- In office 1997–1998
- Preceded by: Richard Daley
- Succeeded by: Deedee Corradini

Personal details
- Born: November 24, 1948 (age 77) Bloomington, Indiana, U.S.
- Party: Republican
- Spouse: Deborah Andrews Helmke
- Education: Indiana University, Bloomington (BA); Yale University (JD)

Walter Paul Helmke Jr. (born 1948) is an American politician, and the former president of the Washington, DC–based Brady Campaign to Prevent Gun Violence. He held this position from July 2006 to July 10, 2011. He is a former mayor of Fort Wayne, Indiana and a former president of The United States Conference of Mayors. As of 2024, he is the last Republican to hold the office of mayor.

== Education ==
Helmke was class president and a graduate of Fort Wayne's North Side High School. He attended Indiana University Bloomington, where he was a member of the Phi Kappa Psi fraternity and president of the student government in 1969–70, and of the Yale Law School. While at Indiana University, where he majored in political science, he was elected president of the student body. Helmke attended Yale at the same time as former President Bill Clinton and Secretary of State Hillary Clinton and was an acquaintance of each.

== Political career ==
Helmke defeated Fort Wayne Democratic incumbent Mayor Winfield C. Moses Jr. in 1987. Helmke won re-election in 1991 and 1995. He did not seek re-election in 1999.

In 1980, Helmke ran in the Republican primary for the then Fourth Congressional District open seat in Indiana to replace Dan Quayle who was running for U.S. Senate; he was defeated by Dan Coats, who later went on to serve as U.S. Senator from Indiana. In 1998, he won the Republican primary for the U.S. Senate to replace retiring incumbent Republican Dan Coats, but lost to Democrat Evan Bayh in the general election. In 2002, Helmke unsuccessfully challenged incumbent U.S. Representative Mark Souder in the Republican primary for the Third Congressional District in Indiana.

As mayor, he was known for reaching out to minorities, appointing an openly gay woman to a human relations commission.

== Family politics ==
His father, Walter P. Helmke, had been elected as an Indiana state senator and county prosecutor. The senior Helmke was the Republican nominee for U.S. Congress in Indiana's Fourth District in 1974. Mayor Helmke's grandfather, Walter E. Helmke, had also served as Allen County Prosecutor and had been the Allen County Republican County Chairman. Walter E. Helmke was also one of the leading candidates for the Republican nomination for Governor of Indiana in 1948 but was defeated at his party's state convention. Walter E. Helmke also has the Indiana University-Purdue University Fort Wayne main research facility building named after him.

Mayor Helmke's brother, Mark Helmke, is a former reporter for the Fort Wayne News-Sentinel. He also served as Press Secretary to U.S. Senator Richard Lugar, as a Washington lobbyist, and as a staff of the U.S. Senate Foreign Relations Committee.

== After political office ==
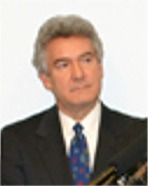
Helmke in 2008

In 2001, after stepping aside as mayor, Helmke co-wrote a book Son of a Son of a Politician, discussing not only his experiences with politics but also that of his father and grandfather. In May 2006 Helmke was named President of the Brady Campaign to Prevent Gun Violence. Before accepting a position with the Brady Campaign, Helmke worked at his father's law firm, Helmke Beams, LLP. In the wake of the Virginia Tech Massacre in April 2007, Helmke made many network appearances on such programs as the CBS Evening News and ABC World News, discussing and arguing for more restrictive gun control. Helmke took the position that the second amendment to the constitution is a collective right of government and not an individual right of citizens.

In 2008, Helmke appeared on The Colbert Report as a part of that show's "Better Know a Lobby" series.

In January 2013, he started at the Indiana University School of Public & Environmental Affairs, and is currently the director of the Civic Leaders Living-Learning Center which began in August 2013. Also in 2013, Helmke was elected as a fellow of the National Academy of Public Administration.

== See also ==
- List of mayors of Fort Wayne, Indiana

Party political offices
Preceded by Dan Coats	Republican nominee for U.S. Senator from Indiana (Class 3); 1998	Succeeded by Marvin Scott
Political offices
Preceded by Winfield Moses	Mayor of Fort Wayne, Indiana; 1988–2000	Succeeded by Graham Richard
