= Tom Henry =

American politician (1951–2024)

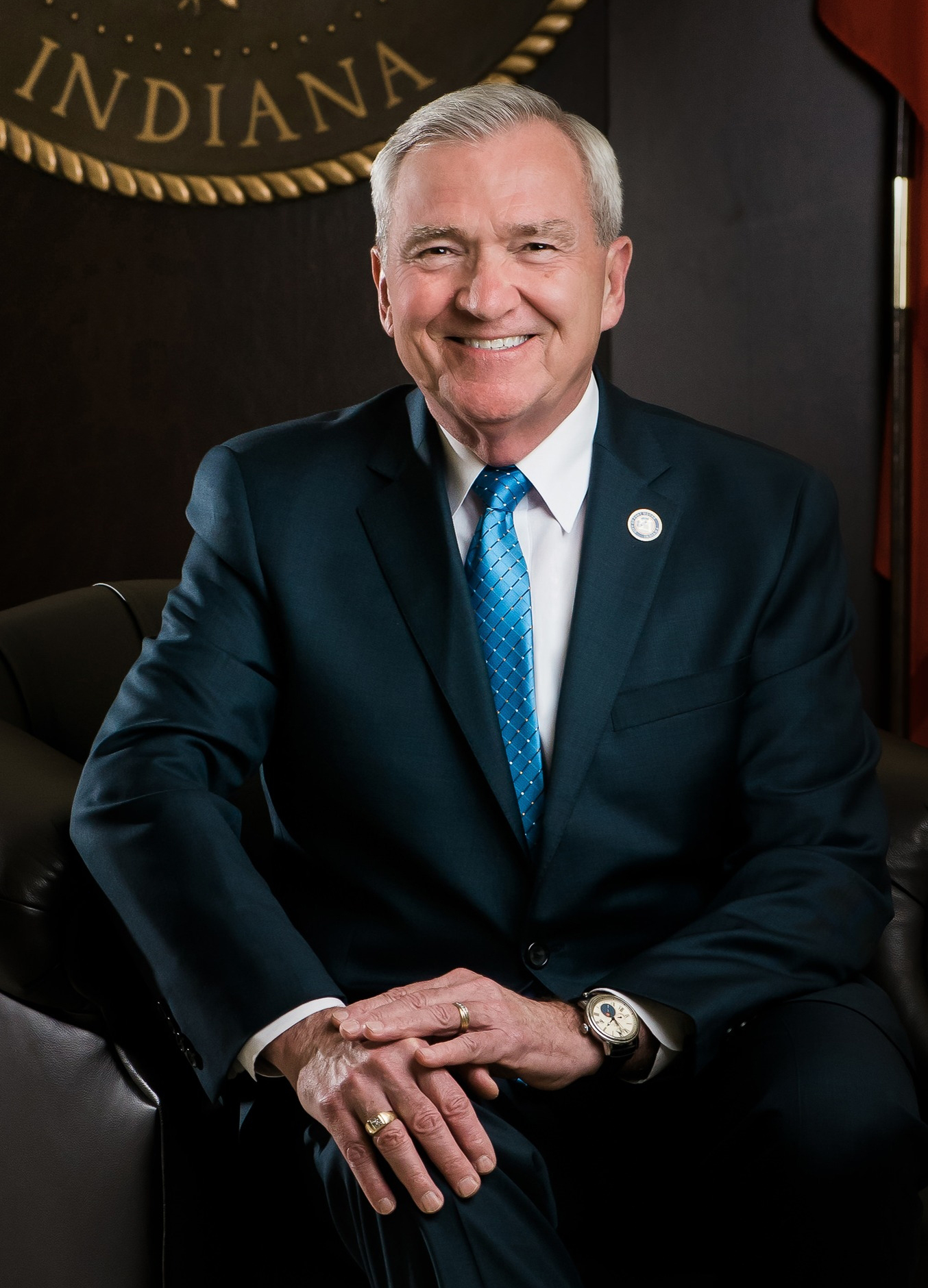
- Henry in October 2023

35th Mayor of Fort Wayne
- In office January 1, 2008 – March 28, 2024
- Preceded by: Graham Richard
- Succeeded by: Karl Bandemer (acting); Sharon Tucker (appointed)

Personal details
- Born: Thomas Christopher Henry; November 8, 1951 Fort Wayne, Indiana, U.S.
- Died: March 28, 2024 (aged 72) Fort Wayne, Indiana, U.S.
- Party: Democratic
- Spouse: Cindy Kocks (m. 1975; died 2024)
- Children: 2
- Education: University of Saint Francis (BA, MBA)
- Website: Government website Campaign website

Military service
- Allegiance: United States
- Branch/service: United States Army
- Years of service: 1971–1973
- Unit: Military Police Corps

Thomas Christopher Henry (November 8, 1951 – March 28, 2024) was an American businessman and politician who was the 35th mayor of Fort Wayne, Indiana, from 2008 until his death in 2024. A member of the Democratic Party, Henry served five terms on Fort Wayne City Council from 1984 to 2004, representing the 3rd District. Afterwards, he ran for and won the Democratic mayoral primary in 2007, before defeating Republican Matt Kelty in the 2007 Fort Wayne mayoral election. Henry served as mayor of Fort Wayne for five terms, becoming the city's longest-serving mayor.

== Early life ==
Tom Henry was the second of 17 children born to Jerome and Marganelle "Marge" Henry. He attended Fort Wayne Central Catholic High School, graduating in 1970. He served in the United States Army Military Police Corps from 1971 to 1973. He then received a bachelor's degree in psychology and an MBA, both from the University of Saint Francis.

== City Council ==
Henry represented the Third District for five terms on the Fort Wayne City Council between 1984 and 2004. Before being elected, he was preceded by Republican Roy Schomburg. Henry won re-election in 1995 by only five votes after the outcome was determined by a recount. He lost a bid for a sixth term in 2003.

== Mayoralty ==
In 2007, Henry ran for the Democratic mayoral primary, winning it on May 8, 2007, with 82.4% of the vote against token opposition. He then faced the Republican Matt Kelty, and won 60% of the vote in the November election.

During his mayoralty in 2008, on December 15, Henry signed the revised noise ordinance passed by city council, making light pollution a violation of city ordinance. "Although I have concerns about this ordinance, it is up to council to decide what legislative action is appropriate for our community," Henry said in a written statement.

Henry was reelected on November 8, 2011, with 49.9% of votes against the Republican challenger Paula Hughes' 46 percent.

Henry defeated Republican challenger Mitch Harper on November 3, 2015, the first Democrat in Fort Wayne's history to win three consecutive mayoral terms. Henry won with 57% of the vote, defeating Harper.

On November 5, 2019, Tom Henry won the 2019 mayoral election, defeating Republican businessman, Tim Smith of MedPro Group. According to unofficial results from the Allen County Election Board on November 5, 2019, Henry won with 61.21% of the vote while Smith came away with 38.29%. Henry won his fourth term as Mayor of Fort Wayne, Indiana, and said his fourth term would be his last.

Despite initially claiming that his fourth term would be his last, Henry launched his fourth reelection campaign on June 22, 2022, running against long-term Republican city council member Tom Didier. Henry was re-elected to a fifth term on November 7, 2023, in a close contest, becoming the first mayor of Fort Wayne to be elected to five terms. His fifth term also made him the longest-serving mayor of Fort Wayne. On March 22, 2024, Henry joined the Alpha Phi Alpha fraternity, the MLK Jr. Club, Creative Sign Resources and Public Works Division leaders to unveil two new plaques installed on the Dr. Martin Luther King, Jr. Memorial Bridge, facing southbound traffic.

== Personal life ==
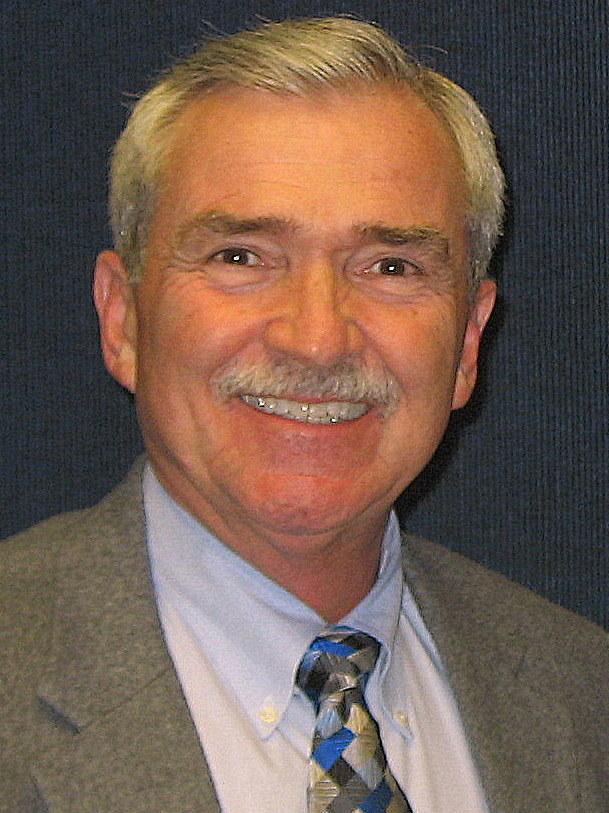
Henry in 2008

Prior to his mayorship, Henry served as president and CEO of the Gallant Group, an insurance agency specializing in healthcare consulting.

Henry married Cindy Kocks in 1975. They had two children and, as of 2009, two grandchildren. Henry and his family are Catholic and members of the Most Precious Blood Catholic Church. Cindy Henry died of cancer in 2024.

=== Legal issues ===
Henry was involved in a motor vehicle crash on October 8, 2022, in which he was attempting to exit a roundabout too quickly and sideswiped another motorist. At the time of the accident, he was driving a city-owned car. He was arrested the next day for having operated a vehicle while intoxicated, and pleaded guilty, resulting in him having his license suspended for 90 days and not being allowed to drink or own alcohol for a year. Henry had a blood alcohol content of 0.152% at the time of the investigation, resulting in a second charge of BAC over .15% which was dropped in the plea deal.

=== Death ===
During a February 26, 2024 press conference, Henry announced that he had been diagnosed with late-stage stomach cancer and that the cancer had spread to his lymph nodes and other organs in his body, meaning that his prognosis was not good. Despite the terminal cancer, he stated that he was planning to continue his duties as mayor. He died four weeks later, on March 28, at the age of 72.

Political offices
Preceded by Graham Richard	Mayor of Fort Wayne, Indiana; 2008–2024	Succeeded by Karl Bandemer
