= Mark Souder =

American politician (1950–2022)

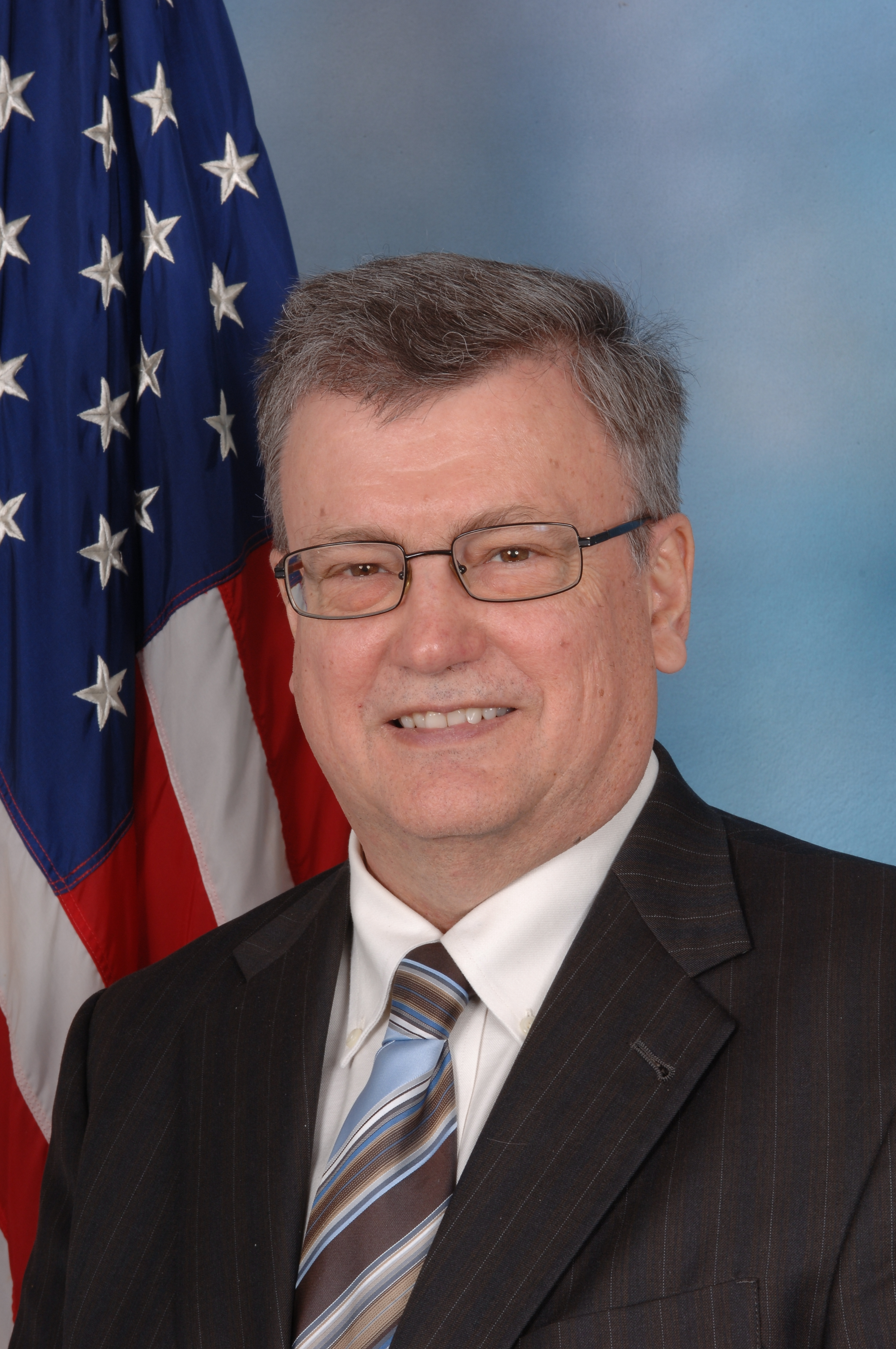
- Official portrait, 2008

Member of the U.S. House of Representatives from Indiana
- In office January 3, 1995 – May 21, 2010
- Preceded by: Jill Long Thompson
- Succeeded by: Marlin Stutzman
- Constituency: 4th district (1995–2003); 3rd district (2003–2010)

Personal details
- Born: Mark Edward Souder; July 18, 1950 Fort Wayne, Indiana, U.S.
- Died: September 26, 2022 (aged 72)
- Party: Republican
- Spouse: Diane Zimmer
- Education: Indiana University, Fort Wayne (BS); University of Notre Dame (MBA)

Mark Edward Souder (July 18, 1950 – September 26, 2022) was an American politician and businessman from Indiana. A Republican, he was a U.S. representative from 1995 to 2010.

During the 1980s and early 1990s, he worked as a congressional aide and committee staff director to Dan Coats. He was elected to his congressional seat in 1994, and remained in office until he resigned in May 2010, after admitting to an affair with a female staff member.

== Early life and career ==
Souder was born in Fort Wayne, Indiana, the son of Irma (née Fahling) and Edward G. Souder, on July 18, 1950. He grew up in Grabill, Indiana, and was educated at Leo Junior/Senior High School. Souder received his undergraduate degree from Indiana University–Purdue University Fort Wayne, and then a Master of Business Administration from the University of Notre Dame's College of Commerce (now the Mendoza College of Business). While in college, he was a member of the Young Americans for Freedom. After graduating from college, Souder worked as a marketing manager and small business owner. He was a member of the Church of the United Brethren in Christ.

From 1974 to 1976, Souder served as marketing manager for Gabbort's Furniture. From 1976, he was the owner of Souder's General Store, also known as Historic Souder's of Grabill. Souder served as an aide for United States Representative Dan Coats from 1983 to 1984; as minority staff director of the House Select Committee on Children, Youth and Families from 1985 to 1988; and again as an aide for Coats from 1988 to 1993, staying with Coats when the latter became a United States Senator in 1989. He was a staff director on the United States House Select Committee on Children, Youth, and Families.

== Congressional career ==
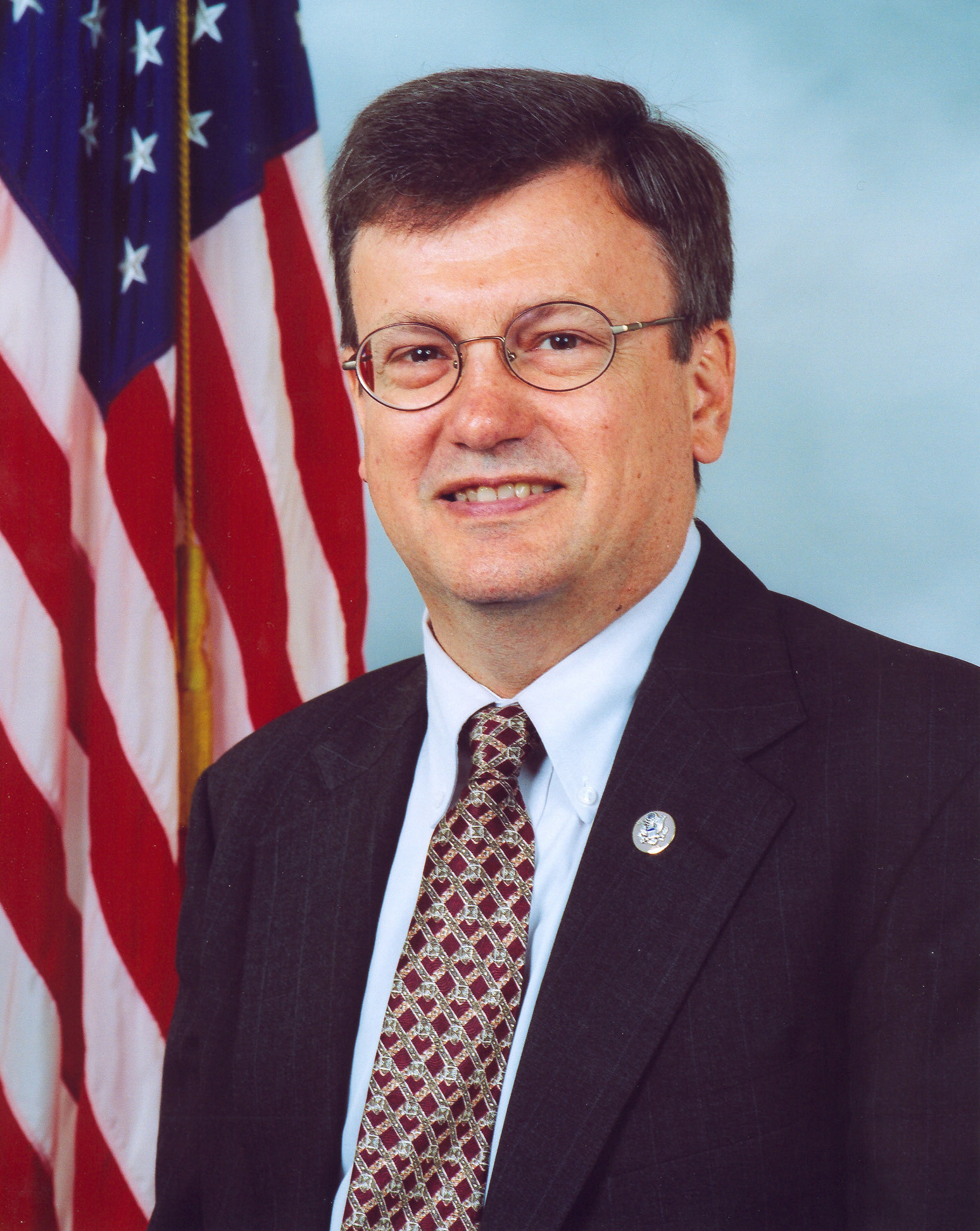
Souder early in his congressional career

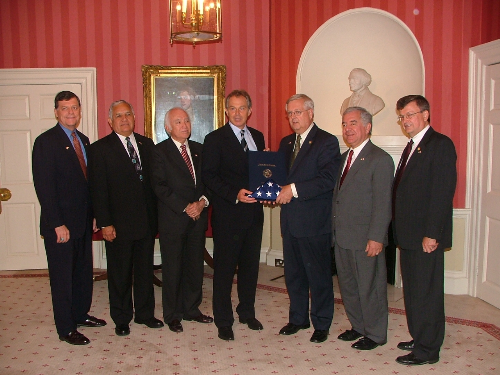
Souder and other members of Congress with British Prime Minister Tony Blair in July 2005

Souder was elected to the United States House of Representatives as a Republican in November 1994, defeating Coats' successor in Congress, Democrat Jill Long, in that year's national Republican landslide. He was re-elected in every election thereafter until his resignation in 2010. It was the only elected office he ever held. He originally ran on a signed pledge with America that he would not serve more than two additional terms. He was regarded as a staunch advocate of abstinence education and family values.

Souder was the Ranking Member on the House Homeland Security Subcommittee on Border, Maritime, and Global Counterterrorism. He was also a senior member of the House Oversight and Government Reform Committee and the House Education and Labor Committee. Along with U.S. Rep. Brian Baird (D-WA), he was co-founder and co-chairman of the Congressional National Parks Caucus. He was also co-founder and co-chairman of the Congressional Caucus on Drug Policy. Until the start of the 110th Congress, Souder was chairman of the House Government Reform Subcommittee on Criminal Justice, Drug Policy and Human Resources.

In November 1997, Souder was one of eighteen Republicans in the House to co-sponsor a resolution by Bob Barr that sought to launch an impeachment inquiry against President Bill Clinton. The resolution did not specify any charges or allegations. This was an early effort to impeach Clinton, predating the eruption of the Clinton–Lewinsky scandal. The eruption of that scandal would ultimately lead to a more serious effort to impeach Clinton in 1998. On October 8, 1998, Souder voted in favor of legislation that was passed to open an impeachment inquiry. On December 19, 1998, Souder voted in favor of one (and against three) of the four proposed articles of impeachment against Clinton (only two of which received the majority of votes needed to be adopted). The only article of impeachment that Souder voted in favor of adopting was the third article, which charged Clinton with obstruction of justice.

In March 2006, President George W. Bush signed into law the Combat Methamphetamine Epidemic Act, which represented the most comprehensive anti-methamphetamine legislation ever passed by Congress. Souder authored much of this law, which targets meth trafficking at local and state, national, and international levels.

In December 2006, Bush signed into law the ONDCP Reauthorization Act, which Souder had authored and introduced. The law reauthorizes the office of "the Drug Czar" for five years.

=== Committee assignments ===
- Committee on Homeland Security
  - Subcommittee on Border, Maritime and Global Counterterrorism (Ranking Member)
  - Subcommittee on Intelligence, Information Sharing, and Terrorism Risk Assessment
- Committee on Education and Labor
  - Subcommittee on Early Childhood, Elementary and Secondary Education
  - Subcommittee on Higher Education, Lifelong Learning, and Competitiveness
- Committee on Oversight and Government Reform
  - Subcommittee on Domestic Policy (Vice Ranking Member)
  - Subcommittee on Federal Workforce, Post Office, and the District of Columbia
- Co-founder and Co-chairman of the National Parks Caucus

=== Resignation ===
On May 18, 2010, Souder announced he would resign from Congress effective Friday, May 21, after admitting to an affair with Tracy Meadows Jackson, a staffer. He and Jackson had made a television video in which they both extolled the virtues of abstinence. In a written statement released that morning, Souder said:

It is with great regret I announce that I am resigning from the U.S. House of Representatives as well as resigning as the Republican nominee for Congress in this fall's election. ... I sinned against God, my wife and my family by having a mutual relationship with a part time member of my staff. I am so shamed to have hurt those I love.

Souder deviated from his written statement when reading it aloud to the Fort Wayne press later in the morning to explain why, unlike many legislators admitting adultery, he did not have his wife of 30 years at his side:

I'm sick of politicians who drag their spouses up in front of the cameras rather than confronting the problem they caused.

== Political positions and actions ==
Souder said that an actual voting record in Congress is more valuable than claimed positions on issues. His 1994 issues profile is available in the project archives. The American Conservative Union gave him a lifetime rating of 90%.

=== Influence of religion ===
In 2004, Souder said in an interview that "the closer to the clearness of the Bible, the less ability I should have to compromise. So I view, on abortion, there's really not much room to compromise." He said, regarding Israel, "[T]he bottom line is, they're God's chosen people. He's going to stand with them. The question is: Are we going to stand with them?" Souder applied for non-combatant status during the Vietnam War on religious grounds. His draft number was never called.

=== Illegal drugs ===
Souder supported the war on drugs. He authored and advocated for the 1998 Aid Elimination Penalty (HEAEP), an amendment to the Higher Education Act. The provision suspends eligibility for federal financial aid to college students convicted of drug-related offenses, regardless of when those drug convictions occurred. By 2006, the law had interfered with the financial aid of more than 9,000 Indiana students (one in every 200 applicants from that state). In almost all cases, the suspensions of eligibility for aid were based on applicants checking a box saying that they had a drug conviction, or failing to check the box saying that they do not, rather than an actual check of criminal records. Following an amendment in 2006, only students who are enrolled in college and receiving financial aid at the time of their conviction could have their aid suspended. Students could resume eligibility after a period of time (for example, after one year if convicted of possession of a controlled substance) or if they complete a drug rehabilitation program approved by the U.S. Department of Education. Before the 2006–2007 academic year, the provision could also apply to high school students, but this changed with the passage of the Deficit Reduction Act in 2001. A 2013 research report by the National Bureau of Economic Research found the law had no impact on drug usage among young people, and that it acts as a strong deterrent to college attendance, severely limiting the ability of people to better their lives through education.

In early 2006, Souder added to a bill about the office of the drug czar, a provision calling for the fungus Fusarium oxysporum to be used as a biological control agent against drug crops in foreign countries. Several federal and state agencies have previously rejected such use of the fungus because it is highly prone to mutation.

=== Online poker ===
Souder advocated a federal prohibition of online poker. In 2006, he cosponsored H.R. 4411, the Goodlatte–Leach Internet Gambling Prohibition Act and H.R. 4777, the Internet Gambling Prohibition Act.

=== Sexual education ===
On April 26, 2006, Souder wrote a letter to the Centers for Disease Control and Prevention (CDC) in response to learning about an announced panel regarding abstinence-only sex education that would be hosted at the National STD Prevention Conference in Jacksonville, Florida, of which the CDC was the primary organizer. Souder criticized the panel, which was titled "Are Abstinence-Only-Until-Marriage Programs a Threat to Public Health?," as being politically biased: in response, on May 7, the day of the conference's beginning and the day before the panel, the CDC removed two unnamed speakers and replaced them with abstinence advocates. The decision was criticized by both politicians and health experts, including representative Henry Waxman, panel organizer Bruce Trigg, and the editorial board for the Lancet. In response to Waxman accusing the CDC of censoring the panel for expressing views opposed to the Bush administration's, Souder's office issued a press release on May 11 characterizing his critics as being upset that "[Souder's office] rained on [their] little party" and that they "[did not] like to have their orthodoxy questioned."

=== Kelty endorsement ===
In October 2007, in the Fort Wayne, Indiana mayoral race, Souder endorsed fellow Republican Matt Kelty. Souder, however, withdrew his official support for Kelty in October 2007 because of Kelty's campaign finance law problems and a birthday cake frosted with a crude joke which was given to Kelty by several Republicans and garnered controversy. Souder said that the joke cake was "immature".

== Election history ==
In his initial campaign for Congress in 1994, Souder pledged his support for term-limit legislation. He served four terms (1995–2003) representing Indiana's 4th congressional district. In 2002, after redistricting based on the 2000 census, Souder was elected to represent Indiana's 3rd congressional district.

In 2004, the 3rd district re-elected Souder 69%–31% against Maria Parra. In the 2006 general election, Souder's Democratic opponent was Fort Wayne City Councilman and military veteran Tom Hayhurst, an MD. Souder won 54% to 46%, carrying all eight counties in his congressional district.

In 2008, Souder was re-elected to an eighth term in the U.S. House. Souder defeated Democrat Mike Montagano and Libertarian William Larsen.

2008 General election, Indiana's District 3
Party	Candidate	Votes	%	±%
Republican	Mark Souder (incumbent)	155,693	55%	
Democratic	Mike Montagano	112,309	40%	
Libertarian	William Larsen	14,877	5%	
Turnout		282,879	61%	
Republican hold		Swing		

Souder's resignation prompted the 2010 Indiana's 3rd congressional district special election, which coincided with that year's regular elections. Souder was succeeded by Republican Marlin Stutzman.

== Later life ==
After his resignation, Souder and his wife, Diane, returned to their home in rural Allen County, Indiana. He co-wrote a book about the history of local television in Fort Wayne, which was published in 2021. He also wrote columns for the website Howey Politics Indiana.

Souder was diagnosed with pancreatic cancer in January 2022. He died of the disease on September 26, 2022, at age 72.

== Books ==
- Souder, Mark; Long, Melissa; Herron, Heather (2021). Television in Fort Wayne 1953 to 2018. M.T. Publishing Company. ISBN 978-1949478747.

== See also ==
- List of federal political sex scandals in the United States

U.S. House of Representatives
Preceded by Jill Long Thompson	Member of the U.S. House of Representatives from Indiana's 4th congressional district 1995–2003	Succeeded by Steve Buyer
Preceded by Tim Roemer	Member of the U.S. House of Representatives from Indiana's 3rd congressional district 2003–2010	Succeeded by Marlin Stutzman
