= Haimanti =

- Pronunciation: /heɪˈməntiː/ HAY-mən-TEE; Hindi pronunciation: [ɦɛˈməntiː]
- Gender: Female

Other gender
- Masculine: Hemant

Origin
- Language: Sanskrit
- Origin: Indo-Aryan
- Meaning: feminine derivative of Hemanta, one of the six Indian ecological seasons.
- Region of origin: Indian subcontinent

Other names
- Variant forms: Haimanthi, Hemanti, Hemanthi
- Related names: Basanti, Grishma, Varsha, Sharda, Shishira

Haimanti (Sanskrit: हैमन्ती, romanized: Haimantī) is an Indian female given name. It is the feminine derivative of Hemanta, one of the six Indian ecological seasons—Ritu—in northern half of Indian subcontinent, which runs in early winter approximately from November to December. The male version of the name is Hemant.

People named Haimanti include:

- Haimanti Rakshit Das, Bangladeshi singer
- Haimanti Sukla, Indian singer
- Hemanti Sarkar, Indian film editor
