= Shishir =

Shishir may refer to:

- Shishir (name), masculine given name and surname
- Shishira (season), the winter season
- Shishira (film), 2009 Kannada film
