= Graham Richard =

American politician

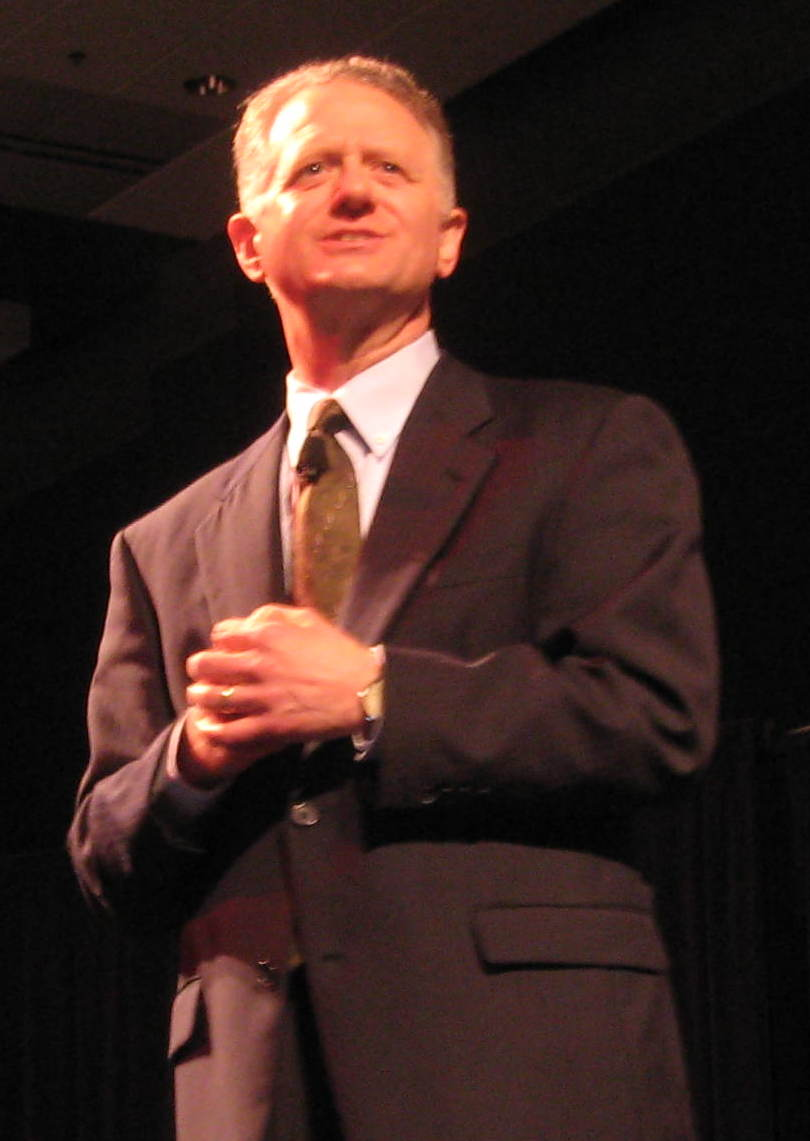

34th Mayor of Fort Wayne
- In office January 1, 2000 – January 1, 2008
- Preceded by: Paul Helmke
- Succeeded by: Tom Henry

Member of the Indiana Senate from the 15th district
- In office November 6, 1974 – November 8, 1978
- Preceded by: Thomas Victor McComb
- Succeeded by: Elmer MacDonald

Personal details
- Born: 1 January 1947 (age 79) Cleveland, Ohio, U.S.
- Party: Democratic
- Spouse: Mary E. Richard
- Education: Princeton University (BA)
- Religion: Anglican

Graham Richard is an American politician and entrepreneur and former mayor of Fort Wayne, Indiana, serving from 2000 to 2008.

== Early life and education ==
Graham Arthur Richard was born in Cleveland, Ohio on January 1, 1947. He is one of five children, as well as the only son, of a Tokheim executive. His mother was known in the local arts community for her work with the Fort Wayne Ballet. Richard is a 1965 graduate of North Side High School and a 1969 graduate of Princeton University, where he received his B.A. from the Woodrow Wilson School of Public and International Affairs. After graduation, he taught at Bishop Dwenger High School.

== Life in politics ==
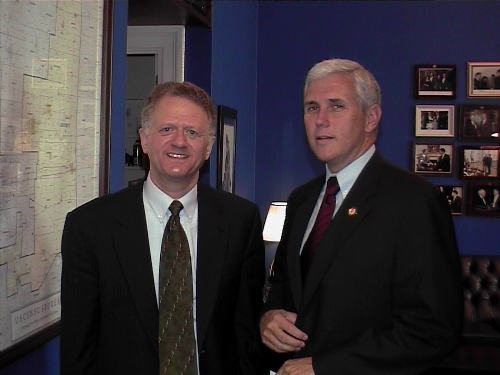
Richard with then Congressman Mike Pence in 2005

After losing several elections for state representative in the early 1970s, Richard was elected to the Indiana State Senate in 1974 and served until 1978.

In 1976, Richard ran for Indiana Superintendent of Public Instruction, but lost to the incumbent, Harold H. Negley by 2.52%.

Afterwards, he continued to be involved in both state and local affairs through his membership on several governmental advisory boards and community service agencies. Richard campaigned in 1999 on a platform of increasing the efficiency and responsiveness of local government.

He was narrowly elected in 1999 over Republican Linda Buskirk, but won his second election with 58% of the vote.

Richard is a great proponent of Six Sigma management techniques, and in 2000, the City of Fort Wayne became the first city government to officially adopt the system.

Richard helped lead Fort Wayne to national recognition for high-performance city services. Results included the lowest crime rate in over 25 years, saving taxpayers more than $31 million using business practices including Lean Six Sigma, and record-breaking investments in downtown development, neighborhoods, and infrastructure while keeping property tax rates at one of the lowest levels since the 1960s. Potholes are filled in less than 4 hours instead of 4 days, and permitting time has been slashed from 48 days to less than 10.

In 2007, the Indiana Chamber of Commerce honored Richard by naming him "Government Leader of the Year." During Mayor Richard's tenure, the City of Fort Wayne won national awards for the #1 Fleet Operation in the nation and the best Public Works and City Utilities Department in the country.

He did not seek re-election in the 2007 city election. He was succeeded by fellow Democrat Tom Henry.

== Post-mayoral work ==
Since leaving mayoral office, Graham A. Richard has become a strong advocate for improving local and state government. He helped launch the High Performance Government Network (HPGN) Home and is focusing much of his energy on helping communities become "wired and inspired."

He has received national awards for his technology leadership, including the Fiber-to-the-Home Council's 2005 Star Award for being a leader in broadband technology. He was recognized as one of the top 25 doers, dreamers, and drivers by Government Technology Magazine for his significant contributions to the digital government movement. In addition, the Public Technology Institute awarded Mayor Richard with the 2006 Tech Leader Award. In September 2006, KillerApp magazine recognized then-Mayor Richard with the KillerApp Trailblazer Award for being a leader in broadband services. Graham was awarded an Honorary Doctor of Humane Letters Degree from Indiana University in 2010.

Graham has become a speaker at national conferences. In December 2005, the Brookings Institution hosted Mayor Richard for a presentation on "Fort Wayne: Wired and Inspired to Compete in the Flat World." Mayor Richard also addressed the Winter 2006 U.S. Conference of Mayors. Other keynote addresses in 2008 include: the Broadband Properties Summit, the DOD Lean Six Sigma Breakthrough Conference, the Mayors’ Technology Summit, and the Defense Business Agility Forum.

In March 2012, Graham was selected to be the Chief Executive Officer of Advanced Energy Economy (AEE). AEE is a national association of businesses working toward a prosperous future based on secure, clean, affordable energy. AEE and partner organizations are active in clean energy policy in over 27 states and with the federal government. AEE has offices in Washington, D.C., Boston, and home offices in San Francisco where Graham currently resides. After almost 6 years as CEO of AEE Graham is now leading the Clean Economy Collaborative. This is an initiative to help accelerate the clean economy in midsize US cities.

== Business ==
Over the course of his business career, he operated several small businesses, including the consulting firm Graham Richard Associates LLC and the venture capital firm Ruffolo Richard LLC.

Among other activities, he helped start a cable television company, a public television station, and a small-scale hydropower company. He was also a co-founder of the Fort Wayne Enterprise Center, a business incubator.

He served as the CEO of Advanced Energy Economy from March 2012 to January 2018. Graham is now leading the Clean Economy Collaborative, which is a new initiative to help accelerate the clean economy in midsize cities and communities.

== See also ==
- List of mayors of Fort Wayne, Indiana

Party political offices
Preceded by John J. Loughlin	Democratic nominee for Indiana Superintendent of Public Instruction; 1976	Succeeded by John J. Loughlin
Indiana Senate
Preceded by Thomas Victor McComb	Member of the Indiana Senate from the 15th district November 6, 1974– November 8, 1978	Succeeded by Elmer MacDonald
Political offices
Preceded by Paul Helmke	Mayor of Fort Wayne, Indiana; January 1, 2000–January 1, 2008	Succeeded by Tom Henry
