= Advanced Energy United =

U.S. trade association

- Formation: November 2011
- Legal status: Trade Association
- Purpose: Transform public policy at the state and federal levels to enable rapid growth of advanced energy businesses
- Headquarters: Washington, D.C.
- President and CEO: Heather O'Neill
- Website: https://advancedenergyunited.org/

Advanced Energy United (AEU), formerly Advanced Energy Economy, is a national trade association representing the advanced energy industry. In 2025, AEU reported over 76 member companies.

AEU states that it is the only industry association in the U.S. that represents the full range of advanced energy technologies and services, both grid-scale and distributed. AEU's stated mission is to transform public policy to enable rapid growth of advanced energy businesses. AEU defines advanced energy technologies and services as included energy efficiency, demand response, energy storage, solar, wind, hydro, nuclear, electric vehicle, biofuels and smart grid.

AEU is associated with Advanced Energy Institute, a 501 (c)(3) nonprofit organization. In Texas, AEU operates as the Texas Advanced Energy Business Alliance. AEU is the developer of Inisight Engine, formerly PowerSuite, a software platform that enables users to search, track, and collaborate on energy policy.

== Founding and leadership ==
AEU, at the time known as Advanced Energy Economy (AEE), was founded in 2011 by Tom Steyer, 2020 American Presidential candidate, asset manager and philanthropist, and Hemant Taneja, an Indian-born American venture capitalist. George P. Shultz, an American economist, statesman, and businessman, was also instrumental in AEE's creation. In 2011, Graham Richard, an American politician and entrepreneur, was named CEO of the group. In 2018, Nat Kreamer became CEO of AEE. An entrepreneur and investor, Kreamer was previously president and CEO of Spruce Finance and its predecessor Clean Power Finance, as well as co-founder, president, and COO of rooftop solar company SunRun.

AEE rebranded to Advanced Energy United (AEU) in January 2023. In February 2023, Heather O'Neill was named President and CEO of the organization. O'Neill previously served as President, Interim CEO, and SVP of Strategic Partnerships. Kreamer remains a member of the Advanced Energy Institute Board.

Today, AEU's highest-level members include CTC Global, Enel, EnergyHub, Highland, Landis+Gyr, LS Power, Microsoft, NRG, Pattern, Renew Home, Sunrun, Uplight, and Wilson Sonsini.

== Publications ==
AEU commissions and publishes reports and other publications to educate policymakers and the public about the industry. These include This Is Advanced Energy, a catalogue of technologies and services, and Advanced Energy Now Market Report, which quantifies U.S. and global advanced energy revenue. AEU also issues annual fact sheets on advanced energy employment in the United States and in several states.

Other AEU reports highlight economic opportunities associated with advanced energy investment and growth. These include Electrifying California: Economic Potential of Growing Electric Transportation and Opportunities for Meeting Commercial & Industrial Demand for Renewable Energy in Indiana.

== State Engagement ==
AEU provides information to governors, legislators, and Public Utility Commissioners (PUCs) on advanced energy technologies for consumers and the grid. AEU also works with environmental, labor, and justice groups at the state level in support of policies that promote the adoption of advanced energy and remove legislative and regulatory barriers to advanced energy.

- In 2020, AEU was involved in efforts to pass the Virginia Clean Economy Act, which was signed into law by Governor Ralph Northam. The Act mandates that Virginia will have 100% clean electricity by 2045.
- Advanced Energy United's influence in California led to Governor Gavin Newsom's executive order to phase out sale of internal combustion engine vehicles by 2035.
- The organization worked with Arizona Public Service Co. (APS) on a plan for the utility to achieve 100% clean energy.
- AEU raised $701 million in New York for electric vehicle infrastructure programs through regulatory engagement.
- Texas Advanced Energy Business Alliance worked with Public Utility Commission of Texas to open proceedings on electrifying transportation.

== Federal and Wholesale Market Engagement ==
AEU has been engaged with the Federal Energy Regulatory Commission (FERC) and has testified before Congress around stimulus for the advanced energy industry and the impact it has on the COVID-19 economic recovery.

AEU filed in support of maintaining FERC Order 841 requiring that regional grid operators allow energy storage to compete in their wholesale markets.
