= Tom Steyer =

American businessman (born 1957)

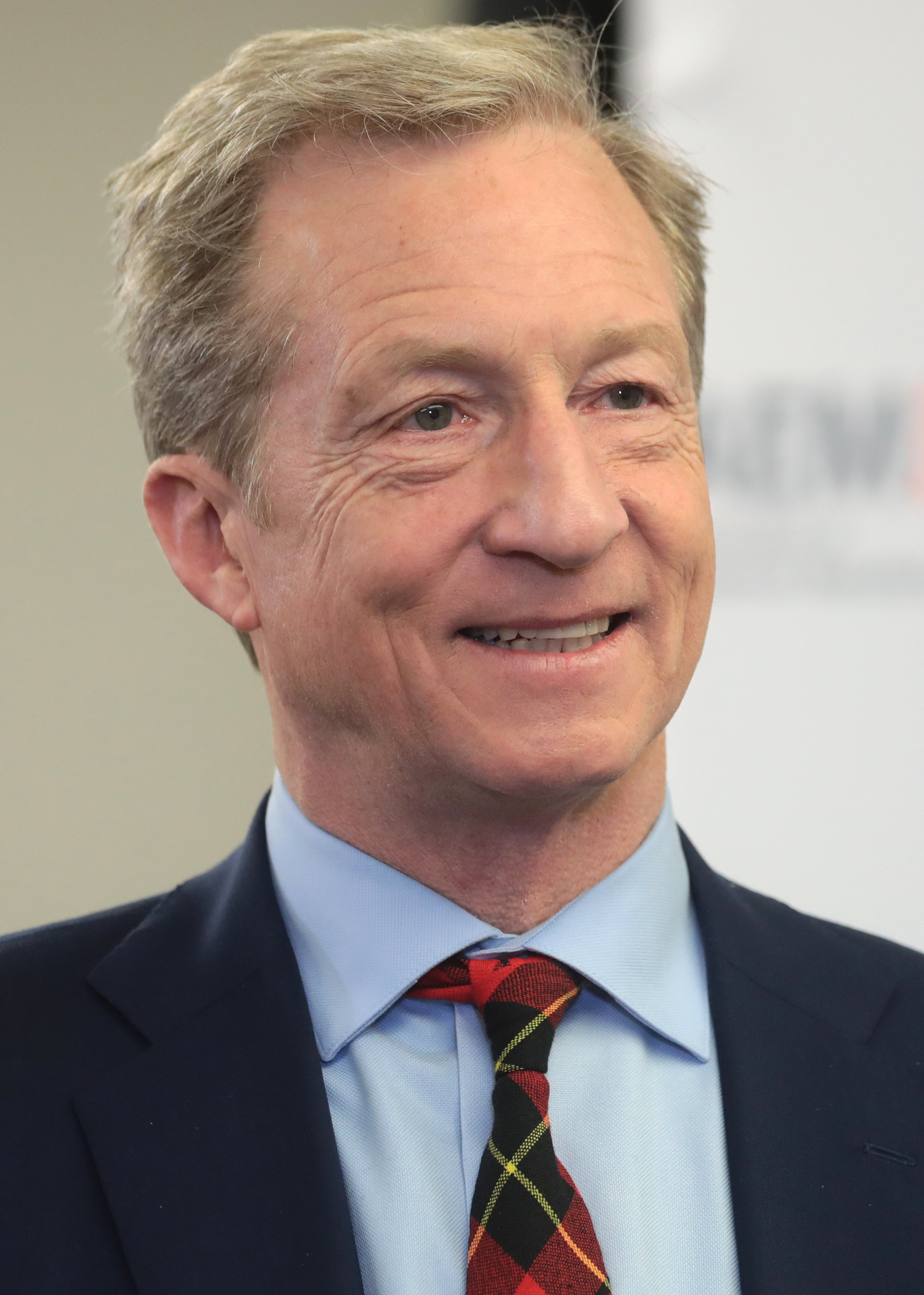
- Steyer in 2019
- Born: Thomas Fahr Steyer; June 27, 1957 (age 69); New York City, U.S.
- Education: Yale University (BA); Stanford University (MBA)
- Political party: Democratic
- Spouse: Kat Taylor (m. 1986)
- Children: 4
- Relatives: Jim Steyer (brother)

Thomas Fahr Steyer (/ˈstaɪ.ər/; born June 27, 1957) is an American businessman, philanthropist, and environmentalist. He is the founder of Farallon Capital, a San Francisco-based hedge fund, as well as NextGen America, a progressive political action committee, and Galvanize Climate Solutions, a climate change-centered investment firm. A member of the Democratic Party, he unsuccessfully ran for the party's nomination in the 2020 United States presidential election. According to Forbes magazine, Steyer's net worth stood at $2.4 billion as of April 2026.

Steyer is a graduate of Yale University (BA) and Stanford University (MBA). He is the founder and former co-senior managing partner of Farallon Capital. Following his departure from the company in 2012, he became an advocate for climate action and founded NextGen America. His book, Cheaper, Faster, Better: How We'll Win the Climate War, appeared on The New York Times Best Seller list in 2024.

A billionaire, Steyer has been one of the largest donors in American Democratic Party politics, using his wealth to fund both environmental causes and political campaigns. In 2020, he ran for the Democratic nomination for president of the United States. After spending $253 million on his campaign, he withdrew from the race in February 2020 without having received any pledged delegates. In 2025, Steyer announced his candidacy in the 2026 California gubernatorial election to succeed term-limited governor Gavin Newsom. Steyer spent more than $215 million on his gubernatorial campaign. On June 2, 2026, he finished in third place in California's nonpartisan primary, failing to advance to the general election.

== Early life ==
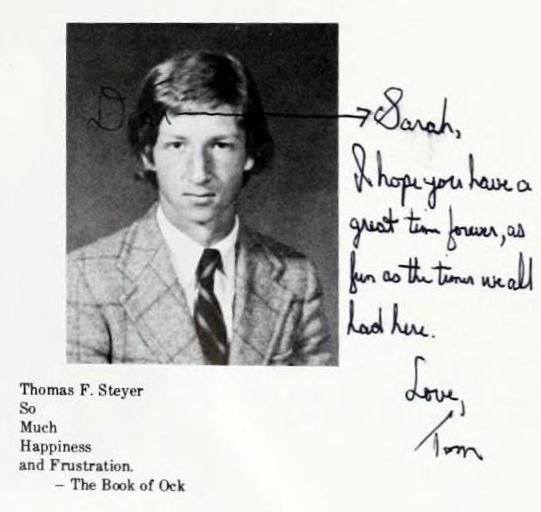
Steyer in the Phillips Exeter Academy yearbook, 1975

Steyer was born on June 27, 1957, in Manhattan, New York City. His mother, Marnie (née Fahr), was a teacher of remedial reading at the Brooklyn House of Detention and his father, Roy Henry Steyer, was a partner in the New York law firm of Sullivan & Cromwell and was a prosecutor at the Nuremberg trials. His father was Jewish and his mother was Episcopalian.

Steyer grew up on the Upper East Side of Manhattan and attended the Buckley School. He graduated from Phillips Exeter Academy as valedictorian of his class. Steyer then graduated from Yale University summa cum laude in economics and political science. At Yale, he was elected to Phi Beta Kappa, was captain of the soccer team, and was a member of the Wolf's Head Society. Steyer received his MBA from Stanford Graduate School of Business, where he was an Arjay Miller Scholar.

== Career ==
After graduating from Yale, Steyer began his professional career at Morgan Stanley in 1979 and spent two years there. Steyer worked at Goldman Sachs from 1983 to 1985 as an associate in the risk arbitrage division, where he was involved in mergers and acquisitions. Steyer also worked for San Francisco-based private equity firm Hellman & Friedman.

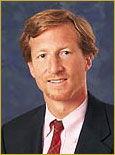
Undated headshot of Steyer

In January 1986, Steyer founded Farallon Capital, a hedge fund firm headquartered in San Francisco. Steyer founded Farallon with $15 million in seed capital. He named the firm after the Farallon Islands off the coast of the San Francisco Bay Area.

In 1987, Steyer, a Yale alumnus, approached the university's endowment fund and asked that it allocate funds for Farallon to manage. After initially declining, Yale later arranged with Steyer for Farallon to manage an allocation of the Yale endowment for no fee.

An article noted that Farallon has a management company in the British Virgin Islands, an offshore company created in large part to help nonprofits, including Yale, avoid paying taxes Steyer wrote in a letter to investors.

In 2002, Farallon bought control of Bank Central Asia (BCA), an Indonesian financial institution, for $531 million. Farallon sold its stake for a profit in 2006.

Steyer made his fortune running Farallon, which was managing $20 billion by the time he left the company. He is a billionaire. Steyer is known for having taken high risks on distressed assets within volatile markets.

Said one former investor with his fund: “He [Steyer] made us a lot of money and his attitude has always been ‘whatever it will take to make money.’”

In October 2012, Steyer stepped down from his position at Farallon in order to focus on advocating for alternative energy. Steyer decided to dispose of his carbon-polluting investments in 2012, although critics say he did not dispose of them quickly enough and noted that the lifespan of the facilities he funded would extend through 2030. A 2014 New York Times article said coal-mining companies that Farallon invested in or lent money to under Steyer had increased their coal production by 70 million tons annually since receiving money from Farallon, and that Steyer remained invested in the Maules Creek coal mine. Prior to Steyer leaving Farallon, a student activist group called UnFarallon criticized the company for investments in companies with anti-environmental policies.

Reporting in 2016 by Politico noted that Farallon had also invested in private prisons while Steyer was leading the hedge fund. According to SEC filings, Steyer was at the helm as the hedge fund purchased nearly $90 million of Corrections Corporation of America stock (5.5% of the company's outstanding shares). After leaving Farallon, Steyer hosted a two-day think-tank entitled the 'Big Think Climate Meeting' to discuss how to address climate change.

In April 2020, it was announced that California Governor Gavin Newsom had selected Steyer to chair a task force focused on the state's economic recovery after the 2019–20 coronavirus pandemic. Steyer's co-chair was political advisor Ann O'Leary.

In 2021, Steyer co-founded Galvanize Climate Solutions with Katie Hall, his longtime friend and business partner. Galvanize is a climate-focused investment firm.

On May 28, 2024, Spiegel & Grau published Steyer's book, Cheaper, Faster, Better: How We'll Win the Climate War. The book appeared on The New York Times Best Seller list in 2024.

According to Forbes, Steyer's net worth stood at $2.4 billion as of 2026.

== Philanthropy ==
In 2006, Steyer and his wife, Kat Taylor, founded OneRoof, Inc., a B Corp and social enterprise business designed to bring broadband connectivity, computer literacy, and employment skills via OneRoof Internet Centers to small rural towns in rural India and Mexico.

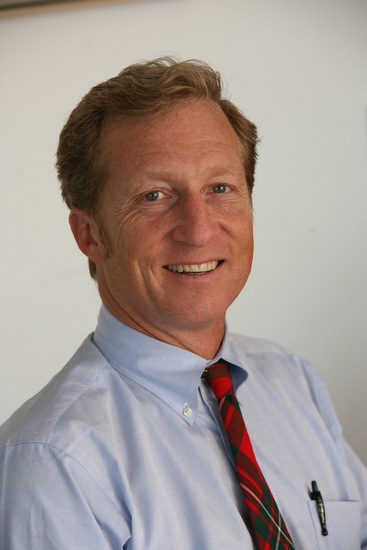
Steyer in 2008

In 2007, Steyer and Taylor founded Beneficial State Bank, a community development bank, for the purpose of providing commercial banking services to underserved Bay Area businesses, nonprofits, and individuals, with operations now in California, Oregon, and Washington. Its stock ownership is entirely held by a foundation such that all profits are reinvested in local communities. Steyer and Taylor put up $22.5 million to start the bank and create the One PacificCoast Foundation to engage in charitable and educational activities, provide lending support, investments, and other services for disadvantaged communities and community service organizations in California.

In August 2010, Steyer and his wife signed onto The Giving Pledge, an initiative of Bill Gates and Warren Buffett. In 2011 Steyer founded Advanced Energy Economy, an energy research and lobbying group with Hemant Taneja, an Indian-born American venture capitalist.

Steyer and Taylor created the TomKat Ranch in Pescadero, California, near Half Moon Bay. The ranch is meant to research and demonstrate a sustainable way of doing agriculture. The ranch's activities include underwriting healthy food programs and co-producing an independent film, La Mission, starring Benjamin Bratt, about San Francisco's Mission neighborhood. Around 2011, Steyer joined the board of Next Generation, a nonprofit intending to tackle children's issues and the environment. In 2013, Steyer founded NextGen Climate, an environmental advocacy nonprofit and political action committee.

In August 2015, Steyer launched the Fair Shake Commission on Income Inequality and Middle Class Opportunity, which was intended to advocate policies for promoting income equality.

== Political activity ==
In 1983, Steyer worked on Walter Mondale's presidential campaign. He raised money for Bill Bradley in 2000 and John Kerry in 2004.

When Republican party candidate Richard Riordan ran for Governor of California in 2002, Steyer made two $25,000 campaign contributions (for a total of $50,000) to Riordan's campaign. However, Steyer did not electronically file any Major Donor Campaign Statements disclosing the campaign contributions that he made to the Republican gubernatorial candidate Riordan.

An early supporter of Hillary Clinton in 2008, Steyer became one of Barack Obama's most prolific fundraisers. Steyer served as a delegate to the Democratic National Conventions in 2004 and 2008.

Steyer has been a member of the Hamilton Project and has been involved with the Democracy Alliance, a network of progressive donors whose membership in the group requires them to donate at least $200,000 a year to recommended organizations.

=== California ballot measures ===
Steyer has been active in California politics, particularly in ballot initiative campaigns. In 2010, Steyer joined the former Secretary of State, San Francisco-based George Shultz, to co-chair the No on Prop. 23 campaign. Proposition 23, backed by a coalition including conservative billionaires Charles and David Koch, aimed to overturn California's Global Warming Solutions Act of 2006. Steyer donated $5 million to the No on Prop. 23 campaign, which succeeded with a margin of 61%.

In 2012, Steyer was the leading sponsor of Proposition 39 on the ballot in California. Its purpose was to close a loophole that allowed multi-state corporations to pay taxes out of state, mandating that they pay in California. Funds raised by closing the loophole, estimated at $1 billion annually, went to a combination of clean energy projects and the state's general fund. Steyer contributed $29.6 million to the campaign, saying that he could wait no longer for the change. The initiative passed with 61% of the vote.

While supporters of Steyer's effort said it would "help break the partisan gridlock in Sacramento", critics objected that "the increasing involvement of rich individuals perverts the original intent of the initiatives". Kim Alexander, president of the California Voter Foundation, said that the level of giving was unprecedented for an individual donor. The initiative was criticized as an ineffective jobs stimulus, while Steyer described it as a success for closing a corporate loophole.

Steyer co-chaired the 2016 campaign in support of California's Proposition 56, which raised the state's tobacco tax by $2 per pack to fund a combination of healthcare programs, Medi-Cal, and tobacco-use prevention. He contributed more than $11 million to the effort and appeared in the campaign's television advertising. When Proposition 56 was approved with 64% of the vote, it became the first successful ballot initiative to raise the tobacco tax in over a decade, ultimately directing over $1 billion per year to the Medi-Cal program.

In 2025, Steyer donated $12 million to become the largest contributor to the campaign for California's Proposition 50, which redrew California's congressional districts in response to what supporters described as partisan gerrymandering efforts in other states. The initiative passed with 64% of the vote.

=== 2012 ===
In 2012, Steyer hosted a fundraiser at his home for President Obama. At a private meeting, Steyer, along with fifteen other top donors, reportedly pressed the president regarding the Keystone pipeline, which Steyer opposed. Obama was said to be supportive of Steyer's views, but reluctant to put his full weight behind any initiatives without better proof. Steyer was critical of Obama's decision to keep an energy initiative as a low priority.

==== Democratic National Convention speech ====
Steyer gave a speech at the 2012 Democratic National Convention, saying that the election was "a choice about whether to go backward or forward. And that choice is especially stark when it comes to energy". Steyer said that Republican presidential nominee Mitt Romney would take no action to reduce U.S. dependence on fossil fuels; rather, he said, Romney would increase it. Steyer went on to support Obama's policies, which he described as investments to "make us energy independent and create thousands of jobs."

=== 2013–2014 ===
==== Anti-Keystone rally ====
In February 2013, Steyer spoke at an anti-Keystone XL Pipeline rally on the Washington Mall organized by Bill McKibben and attended by tens of thousands. McKibben asked Steyer to join the protest by tying himself to the White House gate and getting arrested, but Steyer was dissuaded by his brother Jim.

==== NextGen America ====
In 2013, Steyer founded NextGen Climate (now NextGen America), an environmental advocacy nonprofit and political action committee. NextGen Climate provided the environmentalist movement with significant capital and political influence. Steyer spent almost $74 million on the 2014 elections.

In October 2017, NextGen America donated grants totaling $2.3-million to eight national immigration law service organizations, including the University of California Immigrant Legal Services Center, the Immigration Law Clinic at UC Davis School of Law, UC Hastings Center for Gender and Refugee Studies, Asian Americans Advancing Justice — Asian Law Caucus, California Rural Legal Assistance Foundation, Center for Community Change, American Immigration Lawyers Association, and the Council on American-Islamic Relations.

==== Electoral campaign activity ====
In 2014, Steyer funded political campaigns to advocate for the election of at least nine candidates and to influence climate change policy through NextGen Climate. Those races included helping elect Ed Markey of Massachusetts over Stephen Lynch to the Senate in a special election in 2013. Reportedly, Steyer spent $1.8 million attacking Lynch, including money for a plane Steyer paid to fly over a Boston Red Sox game with a banner that read, "Steve Lynch for Oil Evil Empire".

Steyer supported Democrat Terry McAuliffe's successful 2013 campaign for governor of Virginia through his NextGen Climate Action, contributing funds for paid media (such as television advertisements) and get-out-the-vote efforts. Steyer also supported Democrats in Senate races in Iowa, Colorado, New Hampshire, and Michigan and in Gubernatorial races in Pennsylvania, Maine, and Florida. Steyer cited Florida's central role in the 2016 presidential election and its geographic position, which makes it highly vulnerable to climate change, as reasons for his focus on the state.

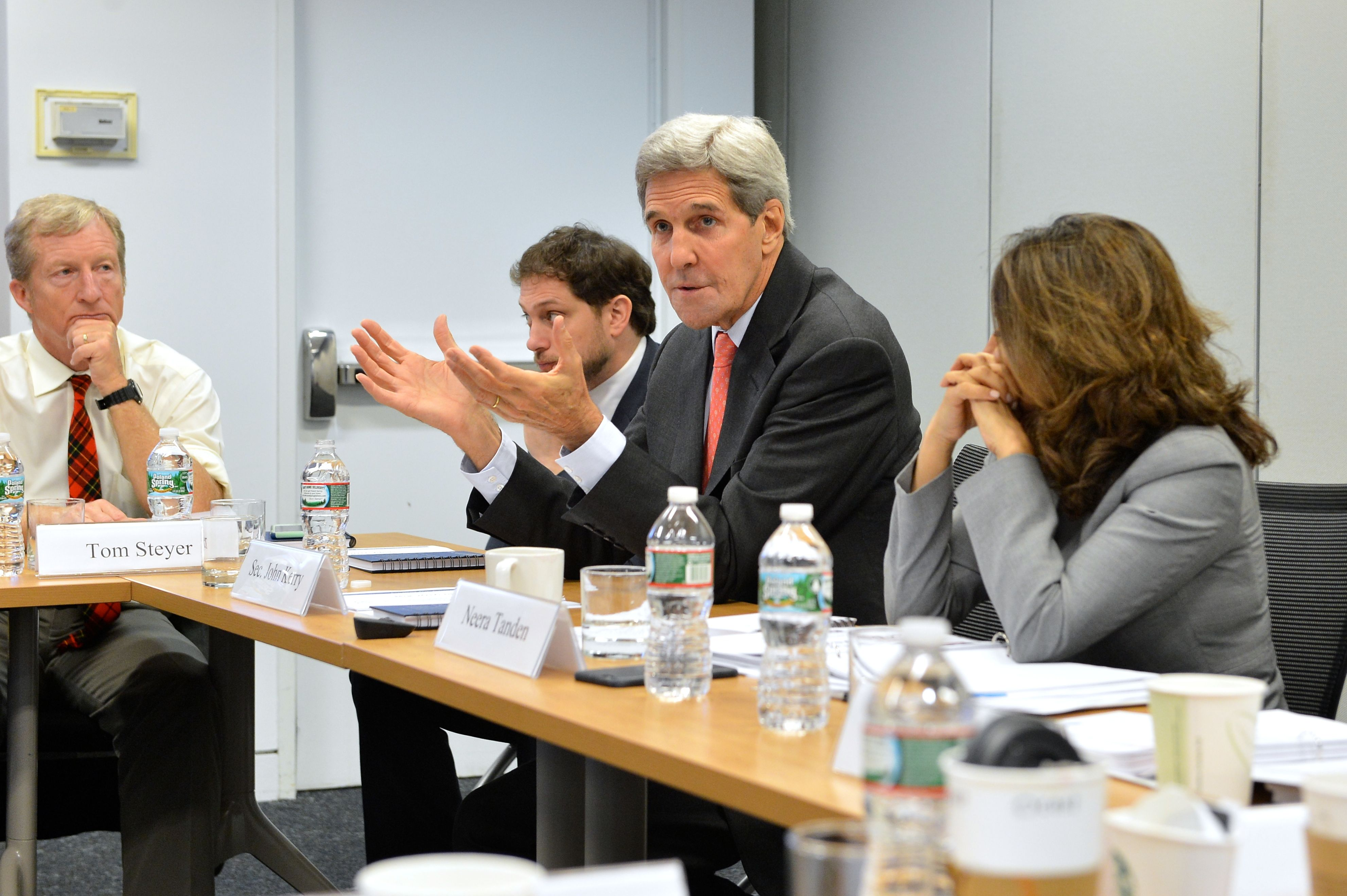
Steyer with Secretary John Kerry in Washington, D.C., in October 2015

In June 2014, Steyer said he planned to get involved in California legislative races, targeting three to four races in each house of the Legislature in a bid to affect climate change policy. The Guardian reported in 2014 that Steyer had become the single largest donor in American politics and is the leading advocate of environmental issues.

Steyer spent about $67 million of his personal fortune in the 2014 midterm elections and had a 40% success rate. Of the seven Senate and gubernatorial candidates NextGen Climate supported, three won their races.

=== 2015 ===
In April 2015, Steyer testified before the California Legislature in favor of a greenhouse-gas reduction bill. In August 2015, Steyer was the guest of honor at the California Democratic Party headquarters to discuss bills to cut gasoline use in half by 2030, although Steyer did not commit to spending large sums of money to support the bills.

In July 2015, Steyer called on 2016 candidates to develop strategic plans to provide the United States with at least 50% of its energy from clean sources by 2030. Politico reported that the message was directed at Hillary Clinton, who had not yet outlined an environmental policy, and characterised it as an effort to align Steyer with her camp.

=== 2016 ===
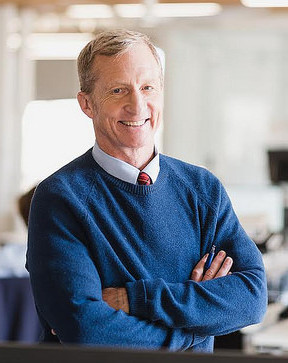
Steyer in 2016

Steyer raised money for Hillary Clinton, and he hosted a fundraiser on her behalf at his Burlingame home. Steyer contributed $87,057,853 in funds exclusively to Democratic Party candidates during the 2016 election cycle.

=== Trump impeachment campaign ===
Beginning in October 2017, Steyer spent approximately $10 million for a television ad campaign advocating the impeachment of Donald Trump, and more on a digital ad campaign to call for Trump's impeachment. In the ad, Steyer identifies himself only as an "American citizen" and alleges that Trump "brought us to the brink of nuclear war, obstructed justice at the FBI, and in direct violation of the Constitution has taken money from foreign governments and threatened to shut down news organizations that report the truth." Trump responded by calling Steyer "wacky and totally unhinged."

The Need to Impeach campaign led to speculation that Steyer was planning a run for California governor or U.S. Senator in 2018, although he did not do so. In March 2018, Steyer launched a 30-city town hall tour and, going into the fall election season, the campaign had amassed close to 6 million petition signatures.

Steyer stepped down from his role as president of Need to Impeach in July 2019 when he announced his presidential campaign. As of 2019, he had reportedly spent over $70 million in the effort. Steyer said Need to Impeach would continue under new leadership and named Nathaly Arriola as the new executive director.

=== Potential 2018 California gubernatorial campaign ===
Steyer considered running for governor of California in 2018, but announced in January 2018 that he would not run.

=== 2020 presidential campaign ===
Tom Steyer
- Campaign: 2020 United States presidential election (Democratic Party primaries)
- Candidate: Tom Steyer
- Affiliation: Democratic Party
- Status: Suspended
- Launched: July 9, 2019
- Suspended: February 29, 2020
- Headquarters: San Francisco, California
- Key people: Heather Hargreaves (campaign manager)
- Receipts: US$206,286,970.59 (December 31, 2019)
- Slogan: Actions Speak Louder Than Words

Website
- www.tomsteyer.com

After initially indicating that he would not seek the presidency, Steyer launched a campaign for the Democratic presidential nomination on July 9, 2019, in an online campaign video posted to Twitter. As a self-funded candidate, Steyer committed himself to spending millions of dollars in campaign advertising.

Steyer qualified for, and participated in, six televised Democratic primary debates. He failed to qualify for one debate.

Steyer came in seventh place in the Iowa caucuses. He finished in sixth place out of 11 active candidates in the New Hampshire primaries, receiving no delegates. He earned no national pledged delegates from Iowa, New Hampshire, or Nevada. Steyer spent a great deal of time and money in South Carolina, far outspending other candidates. However, on February 29, 2020, he finished third in the 2020 South Carolina Democratic primary (behind Joe Biden and Bernie Sanders) with 11% of the vote and no pledged delegates. Following the South Carolina primary, Steyer suspended his campaign.

Steyer spent over $253 million on his 2020 presidential campaign. Nearly $250 million of that sum consisted of his personal funds. In the three primaries where he was on the ballot before dropping out of the race, he spent $3,373 for every vote he received. During Steyer's time as a candidate, his campaign spending surpassed the spending of every other Democratic candidate except fellow billionaire Michael Bloomberg.

After leaving the race, Steyer co-chaired then–former Vice President Biden's Climate Engagement Advisory Council to help mobilize climate voters.

=== 2024 presidential election ===
In 2023, Steyer held a fundraiser for President Joe Biden's re-election bid for the White House in his San Francisco home.

=== 2026 California gubernatorial campaign ===
In November 2025, Steyer entered the 2026 race to succeed Gavin Newsom (who is term-limited) as governor of California. Steyer portrayed himself as an outsider focused on affordability and unafraid to "change up the system" in an open race without a clear front-runner.

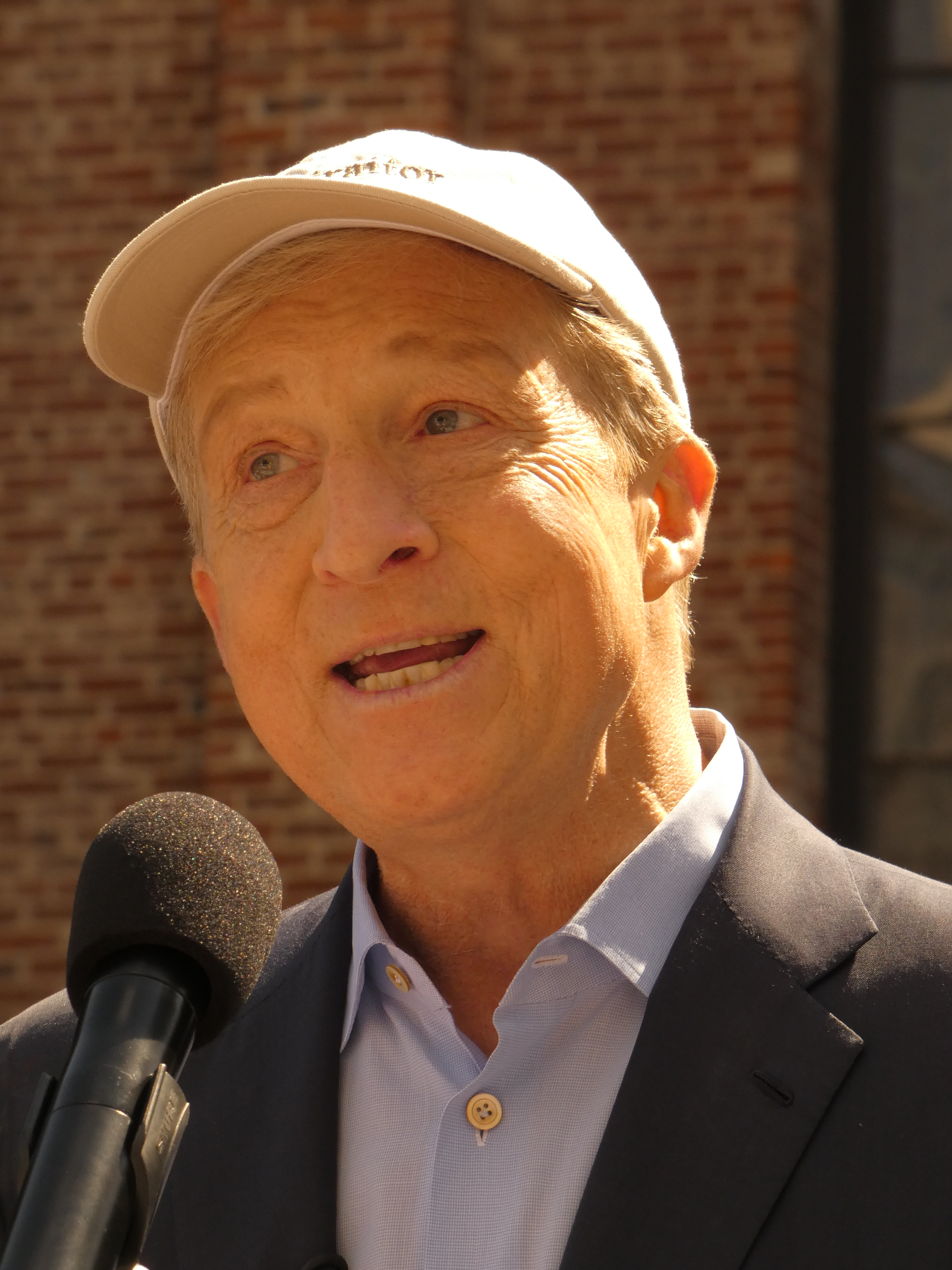
Steyer speaks at a 2026 GOTV rally in San Francisco

In March 2026, Steyer's campaign petitioned the California Secretary of State to disqualify Eric Swalwell from running in the governor's race. Steyer argued that Swalwell is not a California resident and that he is domiciled in Washington, D.C. The petition was denied. Swalwell later withdrew from the race following allegations of sexual misconduct.

Steyer's campaign rapidly became the highest-spending 2026 gubernatorial campaign in California. He "vastly outspent everyone else in the race". Steyer spent more than $215 million of his own funds on the campaign.

On June 2, 2026, Steyer finished in third place in California's nonpartisan primary, failing to advance to the general election. He was eliminated by Democrat Xavier Becerra and Republican Steve Hilton. On June 9, he conceded the race and endorsed Becerra.

== Political positions ==
=== Environmentalism ===
==== Keystone Pipeline ====
After holding several conversations during the summer of 2012 with environmental writer Bill McKibben, Steyer decided to focus much of his attention on the Keystone Pipeline. Steyer officially left Farallon in 2012. He was criticized by some Republicans for attacking the pipeline even though he held some investments in the fossil-fuel industry. The investments included stock in Kinder Morgan, which had its own pipeline connecting the Canadian bitumen sands to a port on the Pacific, which could be seen as a rival to the Keystone pipeline. Steyer promised to fully unload his holdings there within a year. In September 2013, Steyer appeared in a series of commercials in opposition to the proposed pipeline.

==== Global warming and renewable energy ====
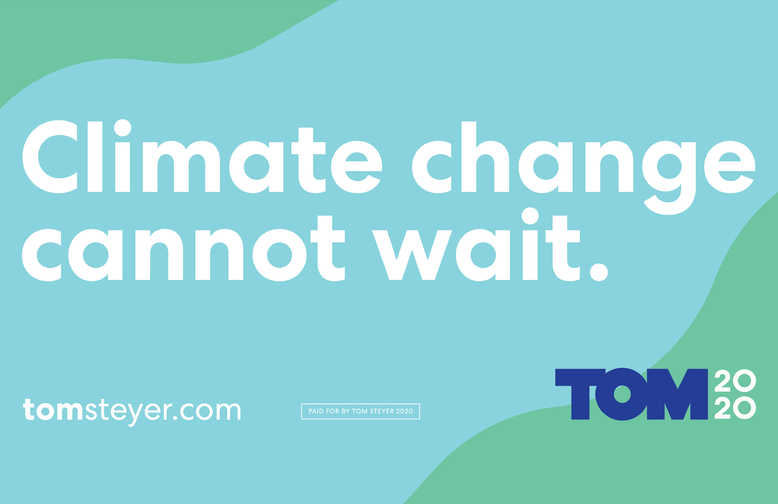
Climate Change Cannot Wait rally sign

In 2008, Steyer and Taylor gave $41 million to create the TomKat Center for Sustainable Energy at Stanford University. Part of the Precourt Institute of Energy, it is focused on the development of affordable renewable energy technologies, and promotion of public policies to make renewable energy more accessible. Projects included the creation of lighter, less toxic, and more durable batteries, and an analysis of the then-current power grids capacities to support future renewable energy technologies.

In October 2013, Steyer launched a bipartisan initiative to combat climate change along with then-New York City mayor Michael Bloomberg and former Treasury Secretary Henry Paulson. The initiative, called the Risky Business Project, focuses on quantifying and publicizing the economic risks of climate change in the United States. Bloomberg, Paulson, and Steyer serve as co-chairs. The Project has published three reports: a National Report in June 2014, a Midwest Report in January 2015, and a California Report in April 2015.

In 2015, Steyer signed on to the Bill Gates Breakthrough Energy Coalition. The goal of the coalition is to jumpstart the demand and availability of green energy sources.

=== Immigration ===
In a 2026 article on X and Substack, Steyer said that he wants to abolish ICE, "counter ICE head on," "fight fire with fire," and to treat ICE like the Mob by "put[ting] ICE agents and their leadership in jail for their crimes." Independent media coverage of the proposal is limited. Steyer said that he would do this by drafting legislation to end racial profiling, allowing the state Attorney General to criminally prosecute and imprison ICE agents and their leadership, investing in California's immigration legal defense infrastructure, and educating immigrants on their rights.

=== Healthcare ===
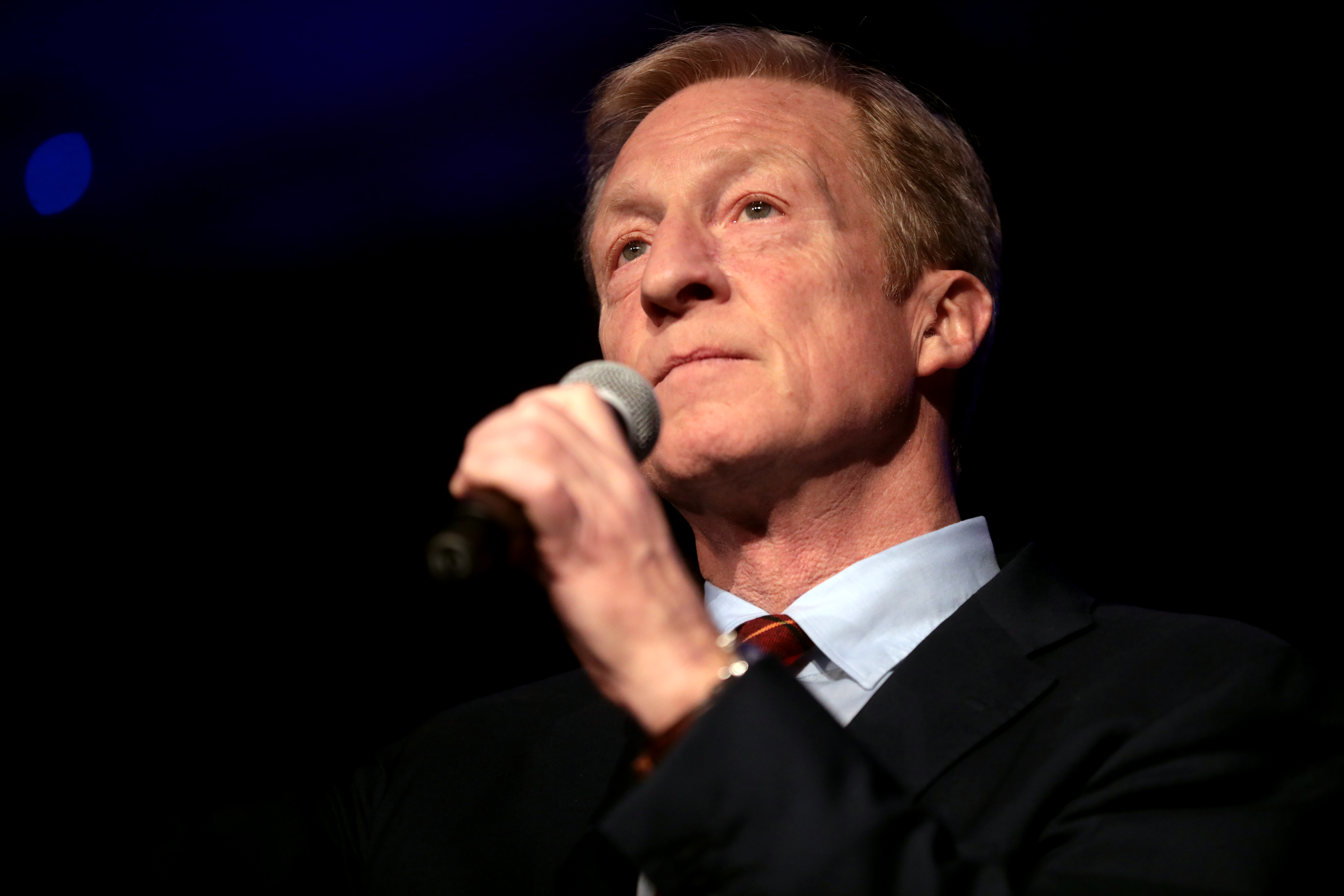
Steyer at the Clark County Democratic Party's 2020 Kick Off to Caucus Gala in February 2020

During his 2020 Democratic presidential primary campaign, Steyer opposed Medicare for All; his campaign ran ads against progressive candidate Sen. Bernie Sanders' proposed single-payer healthcare plan.

In December 2025, Steyer reversed his position, posting a video to social media in which he said he had been "wrong" to oppose single-payer healthcare and that "Bernie Sanders was right".

=== Gun control ===
Regarding gun control, Steyer supports a ban on assault weapons and supports universal background checks for gun purchasers.

=== Campaign finance ===
Asked in a November 2014 interview why he invests his money into elections rather than philanthropic organizations, Steyer stated that the price of inaction is too high not to take a direct role. He has said that he opposes Citizens United v. FEC, the 2010 Supreme Court decision allowing unlimited corporate donations to super PACs.

=== Taxation ===
In an interview in October 2017, Steyer said that he was in favor of raising personal taxes. He said that upper-income people in the United States had done "disproportionately well" at the expense of working families. Steyer called one version of a 2017 Republican tax reform proposal a "thinly veiled reverse Robin Hood". In January 2026, he wrote an article supporting the proposed one-off wealth tax in California.

=== 5 Rights ===
In November 2018, in a full-page USA Today ad, Steyer outlined five non-partisan issue areas on which he said the Democrats should campaign, and which "represent essential freedoms that should be guaranteed for all Americans": voting rights protections, a clean environment, a complete education, a living wage, and good health.

== Awards and honors ==
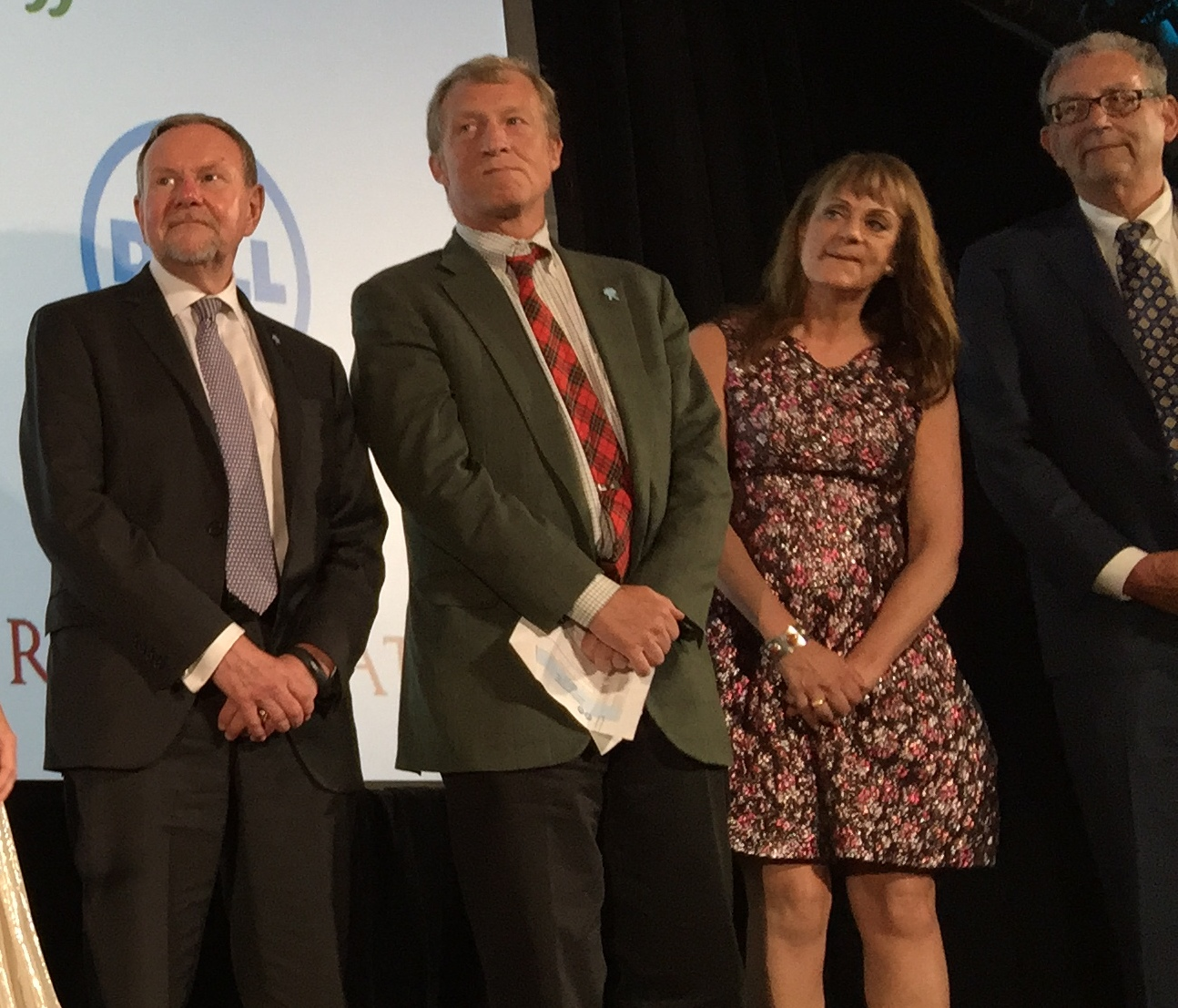
Steyer at a United Nations gala in June 2015

Steyer has received a number of awards and honors for his environmental work, including the Phillip Burton Public Service Award of Consumer Watchdog (2011), the Environmental Leadership Award of the California League of Conservation Voters (2012), the Environmental Achievement Award of the Environmental Law Institute (2013), and the Land Conservation Award of the Open Space Institute (2015).

Steyer received Equality California's 2015 Humanitarian Award "for his work advancing progressive causes that benefit the LGBT community."

== Personal life ==
In August 1986, Steyer married Kathryn Ann Taylor, a graduate of Harvard College who earned a Master of Business Administration and a Juris Doctor from Stanford University. Kathryn was on the President's Council for the United Religions Initiative, an interfaith group. The Reverend Richard Thayer, a Presbyterian minister, and Rabbi Charles Familant performed the ceremony. They have four children.

Steyer has two brothers: Hume Steyer, an attorney in New York City; and Jim Steyer, who founded Common Sense Media.

Men's Journal mentioned the modest aspects of his lifestyle, noting that he owns an "outdated hybrid Honda Accord" and eschews luxury items such as expensive watches. Steyer wears tartan neckties every day; he does this because (in his words) "You gotta dress up for a fight."

Steyer served on the board of trustees at Stanford University from 2007 to 2017.

In his late 30s, Steyer had "a revelation" and began an involvement in the Episcopal Church, the religion of his mother (his father was a non-practicing Jew). He has stated that during this time, he became much more interested in religion and theology. The new interest reportedly galvanized his political advocacy.

He resides in Burlingame, California.

== Bibliography ==
- Steyer, Tom. Cheaper, Faster, Better: How We'll Win the Climate War. (2024). Spiegel & Grau. ISBN 9781954118645.
