= G. Hemantha Kumar =

G. Hemantha Kumar, born on 21 May 1959, is the vice chancellor of the University of Mysore, Mysore.

== Academic career ==
Kumar has published over 336 research papers in national and international peer-reviewed journals and presented more than 150 papers at conferences. His research contributions have earned him 2850 scientific citations and an H-index of 26.

Kumar initiated new pharmacy courses in University of Mysore.

He has supervised 20 Ph.D. candidates and is presently guiding 8 more. He has secured research grants from DST, AICTE, UGC, DIETY, and international partnerships totaling over five crores. Kumar is a member of ISTE, CSI, Indian Science Congress Association, and IAPR. He has held administrative roles including Chairman of the Computer Science Department, Director of the International Center, and led projects like Vignyan Bhavan and High-Performance Computing.

== Awards and honours ==
- Millennium Plaques Honor (2018) – Awarded by the Indian Science Congress Association for contributions to Science & Technology.
- Upadhyaya Samman State Level Award (2017) – From the Upadhyaya Moodubelle Art Foundation, Udupi.
- Teachers' Day Award for Best Teacher (2017)
