= Hemanth Muddappa =

Indian motorsports athlete

Hemanth Muddappa (born 1990) is an Indian motorsports athlete from Bengaluru. He competes in Indian National Motorcycle Drag Racing Championship and is an 18-time National champion in different classes. He is from Mantra Racing team, Bengaluru.

== Background ==
Muddappa is from Bengaluru, Karnataka. He is from Kodava community.

== Career ==
In 2025, Muddappa won the FMSCI National Drag Championship titles in three classes taking his career total number of Indian National Motorcycle Drag Championship titles to 18. On 28 December 2025, he finished fourth in the Super Sport 4-Stroke 1051-1650cc class, and the 14 points he got were enough for winning the National title in the fourth and final round at the Madras International Circuit in Chennai.

Muddappa also won a second place behind Hanuman Pawshe in the Super Sport (4-Stroke) 851-1050cc class but garnered enough point to win his 16th National crown. In the third round of the championship on 27 December 2025, he won a double to lead two classes and equaled the then leader Pawshe in the Unrestricted class at 55 points to keep himself in race for three titles. However, an alleged jump start saw him relinquish the unrestricted class crown. Later, his appeal to the Indian Motor Sports Appeals Court (IMSAC) was upheld and the Unrestricted class title was restored to him bringing his tally to 18 National titles.

Earlier in 2024, Muddappa won the National crown in three classes and ended the year with 15 national titles. He is the first Indian motorsports athlete to win 15 national titles in any of the motorsports disciplines. In the 2024 season, he won the 4-stroke unrestricted class, 4-stroke 851 to 1050cc class and super sport 1051 to 1650cc class.

Muddappa started his racing career in 2017 at the Madras Motor Racing Track, which is renamed as the Madras International Circuit. He first won the national title in the unrestricted class in 2017. He retained the unrestricted class in 2018 and won two more titles in the 851 to 1050cc class and 1050cc and above class. In 2019, he won his fifth National championship crown winning the unrestricted class for the third straight time. In 2020, he won two more titles in the 851 to 1050cc class and 1051cc and above class. The unrestricted class was withdrawn from the National Championship status in 2020. In 2021 and 2022, he retained the 1051cc and above class. In 2023, he won both the Unrestricted class and 1050cc and above class to become the only Indian athlete to have a dozen championship titles in the fmsci Indian National Motorcycle Drag Racing Championship.

On 13 April 2025, Muddappa defeated world champion Ricky Gadson of the United States at the Valley Run summer edition. Riding a Mantra Racing tuned BMW S1000RR, he clocked a 9.477 to beat the 13 time world champion in the quarter mile race.

== Records ==
In 2019, Muddappa equalled the course record at MMRT in the fourth and final round of the championship. He also won a hat-trick, winning for the third year in one category.

In October 2021, Muddappa set a record in the "Super Sport 1051cc and above class" clocking 07,913seconds over the 302-metre Madras Motor Sports Club drag strip. He broke the record again in 27 February 2022, with a time of 07.749 seconds astride a black Suzuki Hayabusa.

On 27 February 2022, Muddappa also broke his own record in the Super Sport 851 to 1050cc class.

=== 18 national titles ===
- Unrestricted Super Sport class: Six titles in 2017, 2018, 2019, 2023, 2024, 2025;
- Super Sport 1051cc and above class: Seven titles in 2018, 2020, 2021, 2022, 2023, 2024 and 2025.
- Super Sport 851 to 1050cc class: Five titles in 2018, 2020, 2023, 2024, 2025.
