= Hemant Rao =

Indian artist

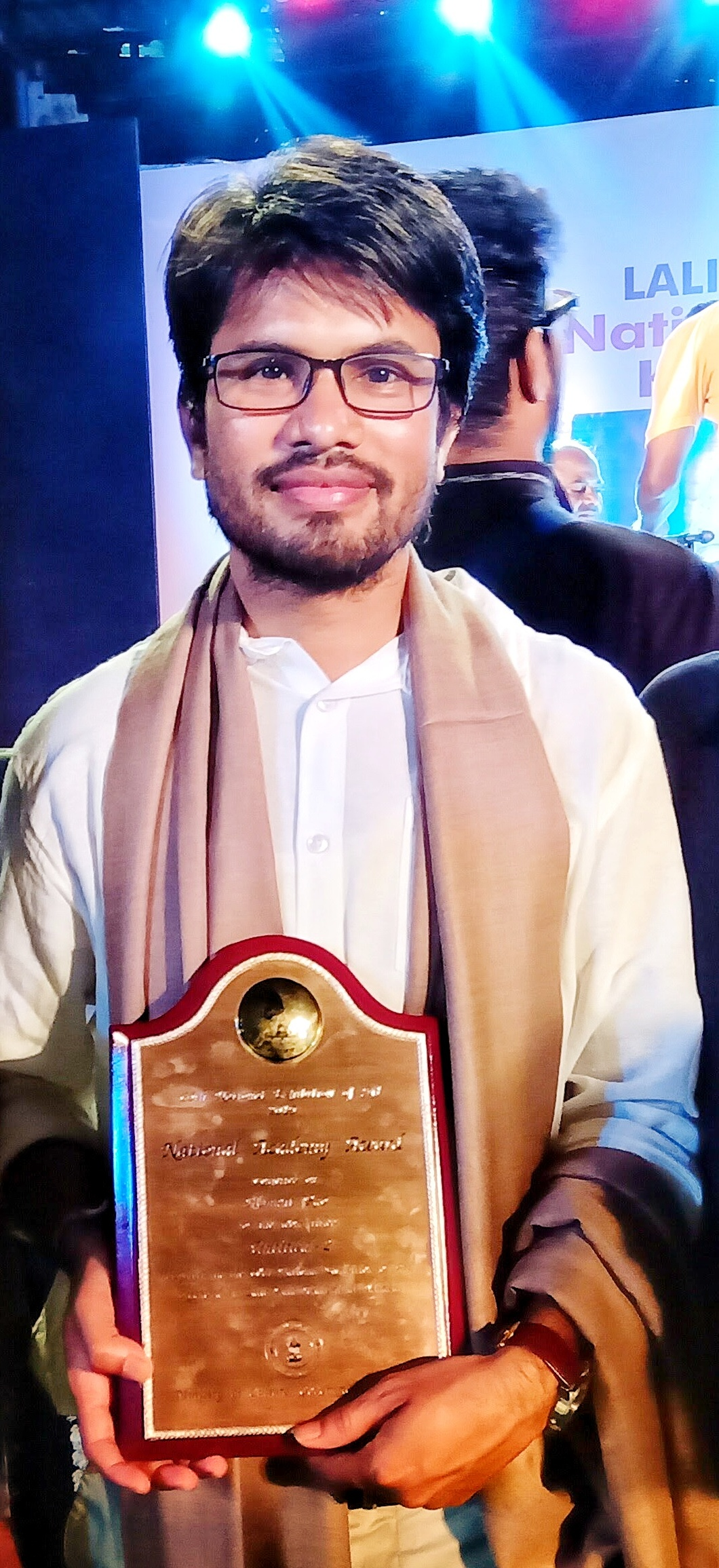
Hemant Rao after receiving National Award in Mumbai (2019)

Hemant Rao is a self-taught Indian abstract artist, whose paintings have been featured at international art fairs.

Rao was born in 1984 at Raghogarh, Madhya Pradesh and worked at Bhopal's Bharat Bhavan multi-arts complex during his formative years.

He has received 60th National Academy Award from Lalit Kala Akademi, India's national academy of fine arts, in 2019. Rao is also a recipient of Junior Fellowship (2011–12) of the Ministry of Culture, Government of India. Despite coming from a humble, rural background, his modern abstract work with soft pastels is free from any regional inclinations, as noted by Rita Dutta of The Telegraph. Rao's paintings have been canvassed at numerous exhibits including Busan International Art Fair in 2011, Seoul Art Festival in 2011, Art Revolution Taipei in 2019, Bangkok Triennale International Print & Drawing Exhibition in 2014, India Art Fair in 2020, among other solo or group shows. The artist currently lives and works in Bhopal.
