= Hemanta Kumar Jamatia =

Indian Folk Singer

- Born: Hemanta Kumar Jamatia; 1954 (age 71–72); Teliamura, West Tripura (now Khowai district), Tripura, India
- Occupations: Singer; Songwriter; Politician
- Years active: 1983 - present
- Known for: Kallu Kumhar Ki Unakoti
- Awards: Sangeet Natak Akademi Award (1996)

Hemanta Kumar Jamatia is a Tripuri folk singer, songwriter, composer and politician. He is a member of the Communist Party of India and the Secretary of the party's Teliamura committee. He received the 1996 Sangeet Natak Akademi Award for folk and tribal music.

== Biography ==
Already a musician at 14, Jamatia joined the Tripura National Volunteers (TNV), a militant group. He left the group in 1983.
