= Shishir (name) =

Shishir can be a masculine given name or a surname. Notable people with the name include:

== Given name ==
- Shishir Bajoria, Indian politician and businessman
- Shishir Bhattacharja, Bangladeshi linguist and writer
- Shishir Bhattacharjee, Bangladeshi artist
- Shishir Bhavane (born 1991), Indian cricketer
- Shishir Ghosh, Indian politician
- Shishir Gupta
- Shishir Hattangadi (born 1961), Indian cricketer
- Shishir Hathwar, Indian engineer, world record holder for the fastest backwards spelling
- Shishir Inocalla
- Shishir Kumar, Indian politician
- Shishir Kurup (born 1961), American actor
- Shishir Parkhie, Indian ghazal singer
- Shishir Rana, Nepalese film director, actor and producer
- Shishir Sharma, Indian actor
- Shishir Shinde, Indian politician

== Surname ==
- Ashraf Shishir, Bangladeshi independent film director, screenwriter and human rights activist
- Fazle Hasan Shishir, Bangladeshi film producer
- Tashnuva Anan Shishir, Bangladeshi television presenter
