= Hemant Taneja =

American venture capitalist (born 1975)

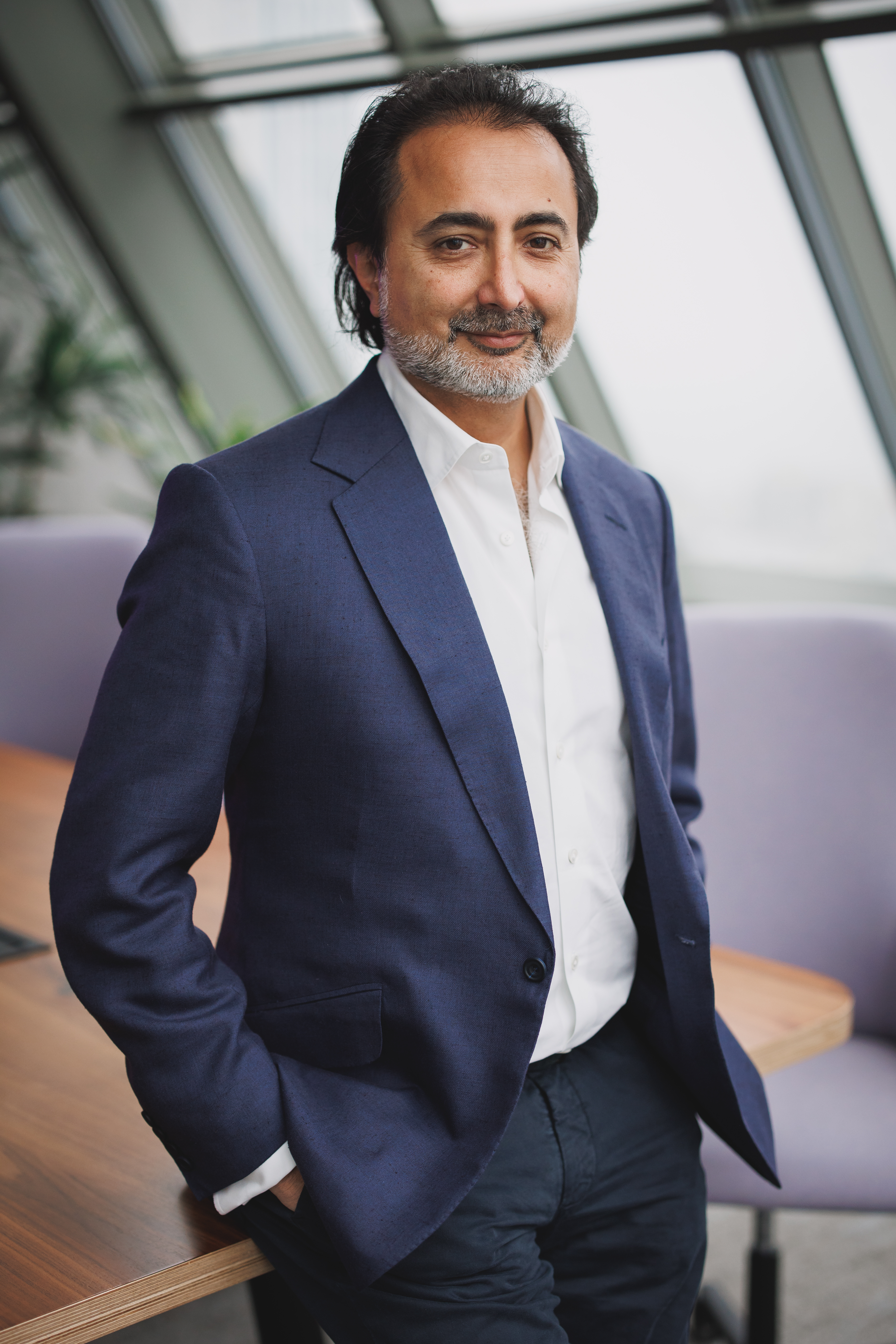
- Born: February 1975 (age 51); Delhi, India
- Education: Massachusetts Institute of Technology (MIT)
- Occupation: Venture capitalist
- Known for: CEO of General Catalyst

Hemant Taneja is an Indian-born American billionaire venture capitalist who is the CEO of General Catalyst, a venture capital firm. He has been CEO since 2021.

As of November 2026, Forbes estimated his net worth at $3.6 billion.

== Early life and education ==
Taneja moved from India to Boston, Massachusetts, during high school. He earned three undergraduate and two graduate degrees from MIT.

== Career ==
Taneja has led General Catalyst in investments in companies such as Anduril, Anthropic, Applied Intuition, Gusto, Ro, Samsara, Snap, and Stripe. In 2024, the firm raised $8 billion to invest in technology startups across sectors including healthcare, climate technology, and artificial intelligence.

In 2011, he co-founded Advanced Energy United, at the time called Advanced Energy Economy, with Tom Steyer.

Taneja co-founded Livongo, which merged with Teladoc Health in 2020, and Commure, which later merged with Athelas. In 2023, he co-founded Responsible Innovation Labs, a nonprofit focused on ethical AI development, which collaborated with the U.S. Commerce Department on the Responsible AI Initiative.

In 2026, Forbes named Taneja to its "Self-Made 250" list.

== Board memberships ==
Taneja serves on the board of trustees for Northeastern University.

== Books ==
Taneja has authored the following books:

- Transformation Principles: How to Create Enduring Change (2025) ISBN 9781637747353
- Intended Consequences: How to Build Market-Leading Companies with Responsible Innovation (2022)
- UnHealthcare (2020), ISBN 1716996511, 978-1716996511
- Unscaled (2018)

== Philanthropy ==
Taneja and his wife are members of The Giving Pledge, committing to donate the majority of their wealth. In 2018, he supported MIT.nano, creating the Shiv and Santosh Taneja Innovation Alcove, named for his parents. He also contributed to the establishment of the Khan Lab School, a school applying MIT's systems thinking approach to elementary education.
