= Hemant Joshi (politician) =

Indian politician

- Incumbent
- Assumed office 2024
- Preceded by: Ranjanben Dhananjay Bhatt
- Constituency: Vadodara Lok Sabha constituency

Personal details
- Party: Bharatiya Janata Party

Hemant Joshi is an Indian politician from Vadodara, Gujarat. He was elected as a Member of Parliament from Vadodara Lok Sabha constituency. He belongs to Bharatiya Janata Party.
