= Mitch Harper =

American politician (born 1956)

Mitchell V. Harper

City Councilman for Fort Wayne, Indiana
- In office January 1, 2008 – January 1, 2016
- Preceded by: Tom Hayhurst
- Succeeded by: Jason Arp

Member of the Indiana House of Representatives from the 19th district
- In office November 3, 1982 – November 7, 1990
- Preceded by: Multi-member district
- Succeeded by: Gloria Goeglein

Member of the Indiana House of Representatives from the 14th district
- In office November 8, 1978 – November 3, 1982
- Preceded by: Multi-member district
- Succeeded by: Multi-member district

Personal details
- Born: April 24, 1956 (age 70) Fort Wayne, Indiana
- Party: Republican
- Spouse: Dawn Wilson
- Education: Indiana University; Indiana University School of Law
- Website: mitchharper.com

Mitchell Van "Mitch" Harper is an American politician from Fort Wayne, Indiana.

He was elected as a Fort Wayne Common Council member from the 4th District on November 6, 2007. He was elected to a second term on November 8, 2011.

Harper served as a Representative in the Indiana House of Representatives from 1978 to 1990. At 22 years of age, Harper was the youngest member of the Indiana House. After 6 terms totaling 12 years in the legislature, Harper did not run for re-election as a demonstration of his personal commitment to term limits. In 1992 he served as a presidential elector for Indiana.

== Education ==
Harper is a graduate of Indiana University and the Indiana University Robert H. McKinney School of Law. He was selected by the Council of State Governments as a Henry Toll Fellow in the first year of that program.

He has served as an adjunct instructor at the University of Saint Francis in Fort Wayne.

== 2007 and 2011 Common Council campaigns ==
Mitch Harper was the 2007 Republican nominee for the Fourth District Fort Wayne Common Council seat. Harper handily won the seat in the fall election with a nearly 60 percent margin. Harper succeeded Tom Hayhurst, a Democrat who did not seek re-election.

Mitch Harper won renomination as the Republican candidate for the Fourth District Common Council seat in the May 3, 2011, primary election. He was unopposed for renomination. He won re-election with over 64 percent of votes cast on November 8, 2011. Harper pledged in 2007 to run a positive campaign.

The Fourth District is on the west side of the city of Fort Wayne and comprises Waynedale, Time Corners, and much of Aboite Township.

== 2015 Mayoral campaign ==
Mitch Harper officially announced his candidacy for the Republican nomination for mayor of Fort Wayne on January 30, 2015. He won the Republican mayoral nomination on May 5, 2015, with 84 percent of the vote over three challengers. Harper lost the general election to incumbent Democratic mayor Tom Henry on November 3, 2015.

== Other political activities ==
Harper was an Alternate Delegate to the Republican National Convention in 1976; he served as Delegate to the Republican National Convention in 2008. He is presently a member of the Indiana Republican State Committee by virtue of having been elected as Chairman of the Third Congressional District Republican Committee.

== Personal life ==
He is a native of New Haven, Indiana, and a lifelong resident of Allen County. Harper grew up living above the family funeral business founded by his great-grandfather, Edward, in 1889. His great-great-grandfather, William Harper, was a pioneer settler in Allen County, Indiana. William Harper had immigrated to the United States from County Tyrone, Ireland.
