= Matt Kelty =

American architect and politician

- Education: University of Notre Dame
- Occupation: Architect
- Political party: Republican
- Spouse: Tami
- Children: 4

Matt Kelty is an American architect and former politician from Fort Wayne, Indiana. He is the founder of Kelty Tappy Design. Kelty was the 2007 Republican candidate for Mayor of Fort Wayne, Indiana and the 2002 candidate for the 81st District Indiana House of Representatives. In 2008, he pleaded guilty to two felonies and one misdemeanor for violating campaign finance laws.

== Public service ==
Kelty was selected by Congressman Dan Coats for the Congressional Student Program. He later served as the Regional Political Director for the Dan Coats for Indiana Campaign, went on to become the Joint Staff Regional Director for both Indiana U.S. Senators Richard Lugar and Dan Coats. Kelty was appointed Chairman of the Young Republicans for the 4th District of Indiana, and organizing Young Republican chapters in eight counties in northeastern Indiana. In 1994 he worked for Senator Dick Lugar's successful re-election campaign, and later worked in the grassroots organizing campaign in Iowa during Lugar's unsuccessful presidential bid in 1995.

In 2003, hours into the U.S. invasion of Iraq, Kelty, with the assistance of Cathy Hawks and others, organized the massive "Rally for America" held in Auburn, Indiana, and headlined by conservative TV and Radio personality Glenn Beck. The Fort Wayne Rally for America was attended by over 20,000 people from Indiana, Ohio, and Michigan and was simulcast via website around the world.

The next year Kelty again spearheaded and organized an event to support U.S. soldiers in the Middle East. Kelty executed "Operation Recreation" in Fort Wayne, mobilizing hundreds of volunteers to collect over eleven tons of recreational equipment to send to the troops in Iraq and Afghanistan. Kelty also raised over $10,000 in donations to pay for the packing and shipping.

Kelty served on the boards of the Fort Wayne Chapter of the American Red Cross, the Fort Wayne Drug & Alcohol Consortium, the Fort Wayne Ballet Capital Fundraising Committee, and the Allen County Right to Life Board of Advisors.

== 2002 State Representative campaign ==
Kelty was the Republican nominee for the 81st District Indiana House of Representatives seat held by incumbent Win Moses in 2002. Kelty very nearly pulled off an upset in this election. Winfield Moses won the election by only 63 votes (verified by a recount).

== 2007 mayoral campaign ==
Kelty upset Allen County Commissioner Nelson Peters in the May 8, 2007, Republican primary election, setting a matchup against Democrat Tom Henry in the general election. Kelty took 50.3% of the vote against 46.7% for Peters, defeating Peters by 658 votes.

On November 6, 2007, Kelty lost in the general elections to Democratic candidate Tom Henry. Kelty conceded his loss with his family in the early evening at Allen County Republican Party headquarters. The final results showed Tom Henry with 60% of the vote, compared to Kelty's 40%.

== Legal issues ==
On August 14, 2007, Kelty was indicted on nine charges relating to his campaign. Five of the nine charges were felonies for filing fraudulent campaign reports, two of the felony charges were for perjury, and the two misdemeanor charges were for co-mingling of funds.

Kelty's lawyers filed a motion to dismiss all charges on October 22, 2007. On February 8, 2008, the motion was denied.

Kelty was scheduled to stand trial on October 20, 2008, in Fort Wayne, Indiana. Prosecutor Dan Sigler stated it did not appear Kelty had any plans of pleading out. Judge Scheibenberger said he would accept a plea bargain no later than October 19. Kelty's lawyers were granted a one-day continuance on October 20, 2008, in order to look into new evidence obtained over the weekend. Due to this Kelty's trial was pushed back to October 21, 2008.

== Guilty plea ==
On October 20, 2008, Kelty pleaded guilty to three of the nine counts against him. Due to his plea, Kelty avoided jail time in which he was facing up to 20 years in prison. Pursuant to the plea bargain Kelty paid a $250 fine for each count, for a total of $750, and served 80 hours of community service. Kelty also served one year probation.

Two of the three counts Kelty pleaded guilty to were related to campaign finance laws. He also pleaded guilty to a misdemeanor charge of false informing, admitting to providing false testimony to the grand jury. The other charges, including perjury, were dropped. Kelty was allowed to keep his architecture license despite the felonies, but the guilty pleas prevent him from being eligible to run for public office again at the state or local level.

== Education degrees and awards ==
- 1988 graduate of the University of Notre Dame College of Architecture

== Personal life ==
In 2010 Kelty filed for bankruptcy citing debts in excess of $450,000.
