= 12th Indiana Cavalry Regiment =

12th Indiana Cavalry

12th Indiana Cavalry Regiment 127th Indiana Infantry Regiment
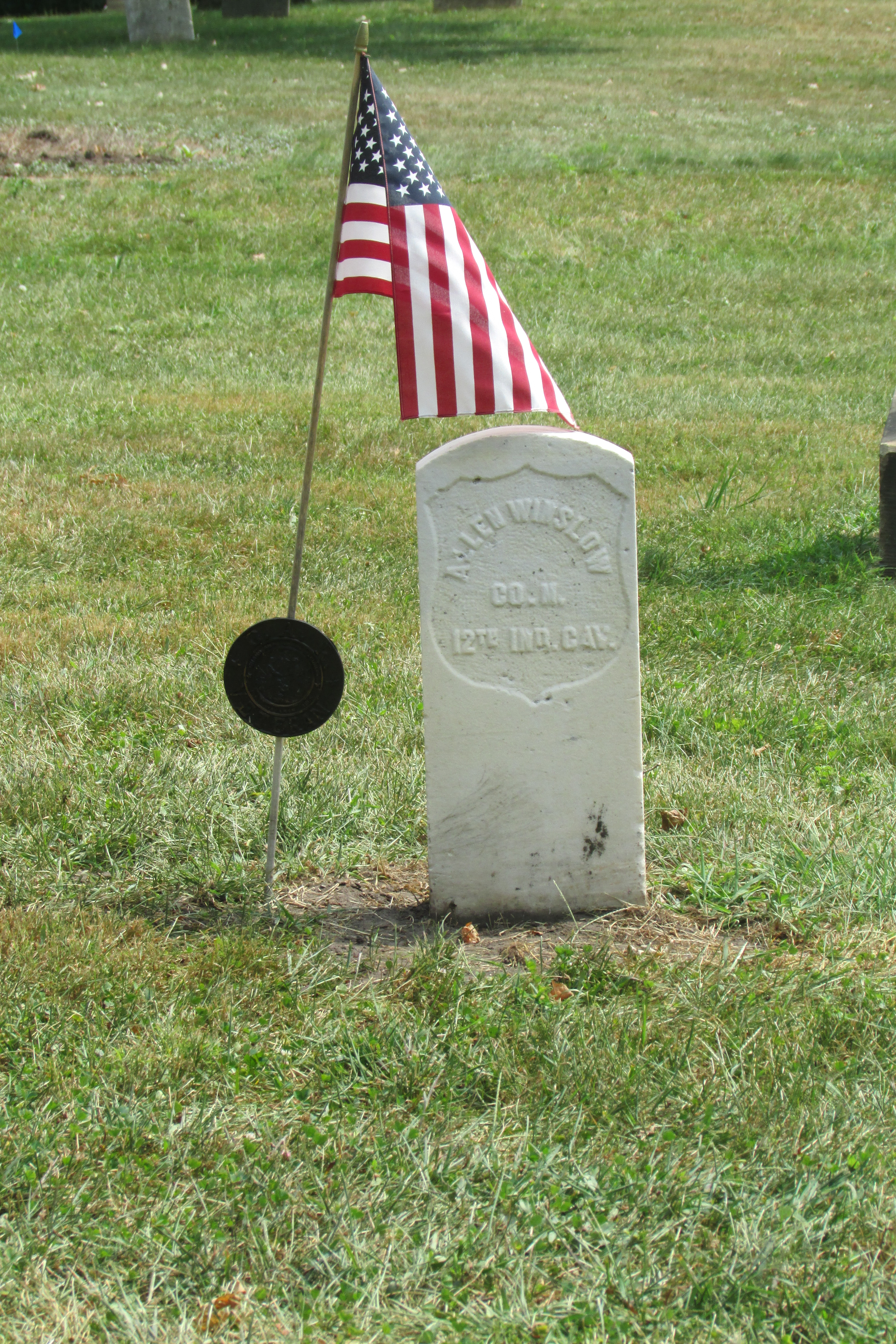
- Private Allen Winslow of Company H, 12th Indiana Cavalry buried at the Luther Cemetery in Porter, Indiana.
- Active: December 10, 1863 – November 10, 1865
- Country: United States
- Allegiance: United States; Indiana
- Branch: Union Army
- Type: Cavalry
- Engagements: American Civil War: Skirmish at Big Cove, Alabama; Battle of Decatur; Siege of Spanish Fort; Battle of Fort Blakeley

Commanders
- Colonel: Edward Anderson
- Lieutenant Colonel: Alfred Reed
- Notable commanders: William H. Calkins

The 12th Indiana Cavalry Regiment was a cavalry regiment which served for the state of Indiana during the American Civil War. The regiment was originally mustered in as an infantry regiment and designated as the 127th Indiana Infantry Regiment but was quickly converted to cavalry and redesignated as the 12th Indiana Cavalry.

== Service ==
The 127th Indiana Infantry Regiment was organized in Kendallville, Indiana and Michigan City, Indiana from December 10, 1863, to April 28, 1864. Companies of the regiment were recruited primarily from the Indiana's 10th congressional district. Although originally recruited as infantry the regiment was changed to cavalry and redesignated as the 12th Indiana Cavalry Regiment. Originally only 6 of the 10 companies of the regiment were mounted on horses and saddles, the rest were all on foot, up until this point the regiment was armed entirely with infantry muskets despite being converted to cavalry. The regiment left Indiana for Nashville, Tennessee on May 6, 1864, and was attached to the District of Northern Alabama as part of the Army of the Cumberland. The regiment was garrisoned at Nashville until May 29, 1864, when it moved to Huntsville, Alabama. In Huntsville the regiment guarded the railroad from Decatur to Paint Rock. The regiment was eventually headquartered at Huntsville and Brownsboro, Alabama until September 15, 1864.

The regiment took part in a skirmish in Big Cove Valley near Big Cove, Alabama on June 27, 1864. Near Vienna July 8. A detachment of the regiment scouted near Clear Springs, Alabama and Sink Springs Valleys from July 18–21, 1864. Flint River, Ala., July 25. Paint Rock Station July 30. The regiment was stationed at Moores Mill, Alabama on August 11, 1864. The regiment took part in operations in Madison County, Alabama from August 12–14, 1864. A detachment of the regiment was stationed at Lynchburg, Tennessee on September 29, 1864. Companies C, D, and H repulsed Abraham Buford II attack on Huntsville from September 30 – October 1 and October 18, 1864. The entire regiment moved to Tullahoma, Tennessee on September 15, and had duty there until November 26, 1864.

Elements of the regiment took part in the Battle of Decatur from October 26–29, 1864. Near Maysvllle, Ala., and near New Market, Ala., November 17 (Detachment). Moved to Murfreesboro, Tenn., November 26. Overall's Creek December 4. The regiment took part in the Third Battle of Murfreesboro from December 5–12, 1864. Wilkinson's Pike December 7. Paint Rock Bridge, Ala., December 7 (Detachment). Murfreesboro December 13–14. Near Murfreesboro December 15 (Detachment). Moved to Nashville, Tenn., and duty there till February, 1865. Action at Hillsboro, Ala., December 29, 1864 (Detachment). Near Leighton, Ala., December 30 (Detachment). Moved to Vicksburg, Miss.; thence to New Orleans, La., and to Mobile Bay, Ala., February 11 – March 22. The regiment took part in the 1865 Mobile Campaign and the defense of Mobile, Alabama from March 22 – April 12, 1865. The regiment was present for both the Battle of Spanish Fort and the Battle of Fort Blakeley from March 26 – April 9, 1865. The regiments last action was during General Benjamin Grierson's Battle of Egypt Station (also called Grierson's Raid, not to be confused with Grierson's Raid in 1863) through Alabama, Georgia, and Mississippi from April 17 – May 20, 1865. The regiment had duty at Columbus, Mississippi until July, 1865. The regiment was garrisoned at Grenada, Mississippi and Austin, Mississippi until November, 1865. The regiment was officially mustered out at Vicksburg on November 10, 1865.

Organization of Regiment
Company	Primary Place of Recruitment	Earliest Captain
A	LaPorte County, Boone County, St. Joseph County, and Porter County	Willys G. Peck
B	DeKalb County, Noble County, La Grange County, and Steuben County	Timothy R. Baker
B	Noble, Steuben, La Grange, and DeKalb counties	Major D. Williams
D	Elkhart County	Josiah B. Cobb
E	Marshall County	Frank J. Miller
F	Cass, Jasper, White, and La Porte counties	Benjamin O. Wilkinson
G	Lake and La Porte counties	Almon Foster
H	St. Joseph and Marshall counties	Amos Dahuff (Dayhuff)
I	La Grange, Kosciusko, Noble, Whitley, Allen, Elkhart, and DeKalb counties	Robert S. Richhart
K	White, Pulaski, Jasper, and Newton counties	Daniel M. Graves
L	Miami County	Ethan E. Thorton
M	Miami, Porter, La Porte, and La Grange counties	Lewis Stoddard

== Casualties ==
The regiment lost a total of 171 men during its service: 16 Enlisted men killed and mortally wounded and 1 Officer and 154 Enlisted men by disease.

== Commanders ==
- Edward Anderson: February 2, 1864 – November 10, 1865. Anderson previously the Chaplain of the 37th Illinois Infantry Regiment.

== Notable people ==
- William H. Calkins: Calkins served as the Major of the regiment from 1864 to 1865. Calkins had previously served in the 14th Iowa Infantry Regiment.
- Josiah B. Cobb: Republican politician and Mayor of Goshen, Indiana from May 1884 – May 1886.
- Robert S. Richhart: Originally served as the Captain of Company I. Richhart later worked for the United States Marshals service out of Warsaw in Kosciusko County, Indiana.
- Lewis Stoddard: A settler from Canada who settled Porter County. Stoddard served as the Captain of Company M. Stoddard lived in Valparaiso before the war and had previously served in Company I of the 73rd Indiana Infantry Regiment.

== See also ==
- Indiana in the American Civil War
- List of Indiana units in the American Civil War
