= William Rockhill =

William Rockhill may refer to:

- William R. Rockhill (1793–1865), U.S. Representative from Indiana
- William Woodville Rockhill (1854–1914), U.S. diplomat

== See also ==
- William Rockhill Nelson, grandson of William R. Rockhill
