= Samuel Morss =

American journalist (1852–1903)

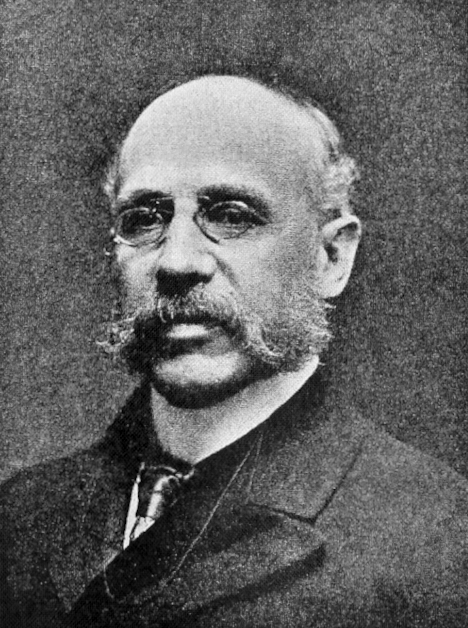
- Born: December 15, 1852; Fort Wayne, Indiana, US
- Died: October 21, 1903 (aged 50); Indianapolis, Indiana, US
- Occupation: Journalist
- Father: Samuel S. Morss

Samuel E. Morss (December 15, 1852 – October 21, 1903) was an American journalist, the co-founder with William Rockhill Nelson of The Kansas City Star newspaper and later owner and editor of the Indianapolis Sentinel.

== Biography ==
Morss was born in Fort Wayne, Indiana, the son of Samuel S. Morss, who later served as Mayor of Fort Wayne. He and Nelson purchased the Ft. Wayne Sentinel in 1879. In 1880 they sold the Sentinel and founded The Kansas City Star. Health problems forced Morss to sell his interest in the newspaper to Nelson and travel to Europe.

Morss worked at The Chicago Times from 1883 to 1887. On February 1, 1888, Morss purchased the Indianapolis Sentinel and became its editor. He was elected chairman of the Indiana delegation to the 1892 Democratic National Convention in Chicago, Illinois. In April 1893, U.S. President Grover Cleveland appointed him as Consul-General of the United States to France. He remained in that post until 1897, when he returned to work full time at the Sentinel.

On October 21, 1903, Morss fell 30 feet (9.1 m) from his third-floor office window onto the sidewalk on Illinois Street in Indianapolis, Indiana. He died on the operating table at St. Vincent's Hospital. The fall was believed to be accidental, possibly caused by a heart attack.

Morss was inducted into the Indiana Journalism Hall of Fame in the class of 1966.
