= William H. Calkins =

American politician (1842–1894)

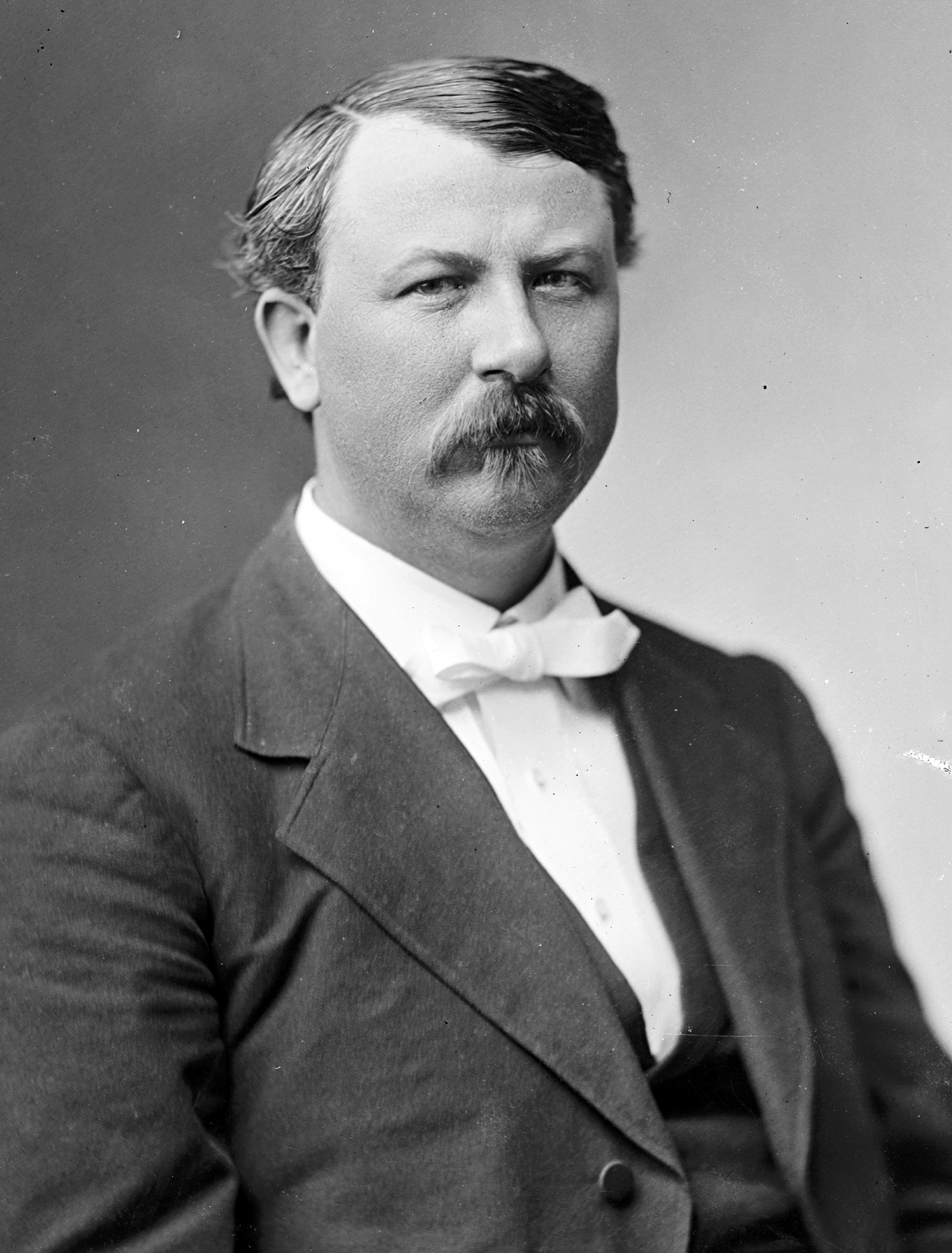

Member of the U.S. House of Representatives from Indiana's 13th district
- In office March 4, 1877 – October 20, 1884
- Preceded by: District created
- Succeeded by: Benjamin F. Shively

Personal details
- Born: February 18, 1842 Pike County, Ohio, US
- Died: January 29, 1894 (aged 51) Tacoma, Washington, US
- Party: Republican
- Occupation: Attorney

Military service
- Allegiance: United States of America; Union
- Branch/service: (United States) Union Army
- Years of service: 1861-1865
- Rank: Major
- Unit: 14th Iowa Infantry Regiment; 12th Indiana Cavalry Regiment
- Battles/wars: American Civil War

William Henry Calkins (February 18, 1842 – January 29, 1894) was an American lawyer and Civil War veteran who served four terms as a U.S. representative from Indiana from 1877 to 1884.

== Early career ==
Born in Pike County, Ohio, Calkins studied law. He was admitted to the bar and practiced. During the American Civil War Calkins served in the Union Army from May 1861 to December 1865. Calkins firs served as a First lieutenant in Company H of the 14th Iowa Infantry Regiment. Calkins later reenlisted in 1864 in the 12th Indiana Cavalry Regiment which he served as the regiment's Major. Following the war Calkins resided in La Porte, Indiana. Calkins worked as the state of Indiana's attorney for the ninth Indiana judicial circuit 1866–1870. He served as member of the Indiana House of Representatives in 1871.

== Congress ==
Calkins was elected as a Republican to the Forty-fifth and to the three succeeding Congresses and served from March 4, 1877, to October 20, 1884, when he resigned.

== Later career ==
He served as chairman of the Committee on Elections (Forty-seventh Congress). He moved to Tacoma, Washington, and resumed the practice of law. He was appointed United States associate justice of the Territory of Washington in April 1889 and served until November 11, 1889, when the Territory was admitted as a State into the Union.

== Death ==
He died in Tacoma, Washington, on January 29, 1894. He was interred in Tacoma Cemetery.

Party political offices
Preceded by Albert G. Porter	Republican nominee for Governor of Indiana; 1884	Succeeded by Alvin Peterson Hovey
U.S. House of Representatives
Preceded by William S. Haymond	Member of the U.S. House of Representatives from Indiana's 10th congressional district March 4, 1877 – March 3, 1881	Succeeded by Mark L. De Motte
Preceded by John Baker	Member of the U.S. House of Representatives from Indiana's 13th congressional district March 4, 1881 – October 20, 1884	Succeeded by Benjamin F. Shively
