= Harvester Homecoming =

Annual truck festival in Indiana, US

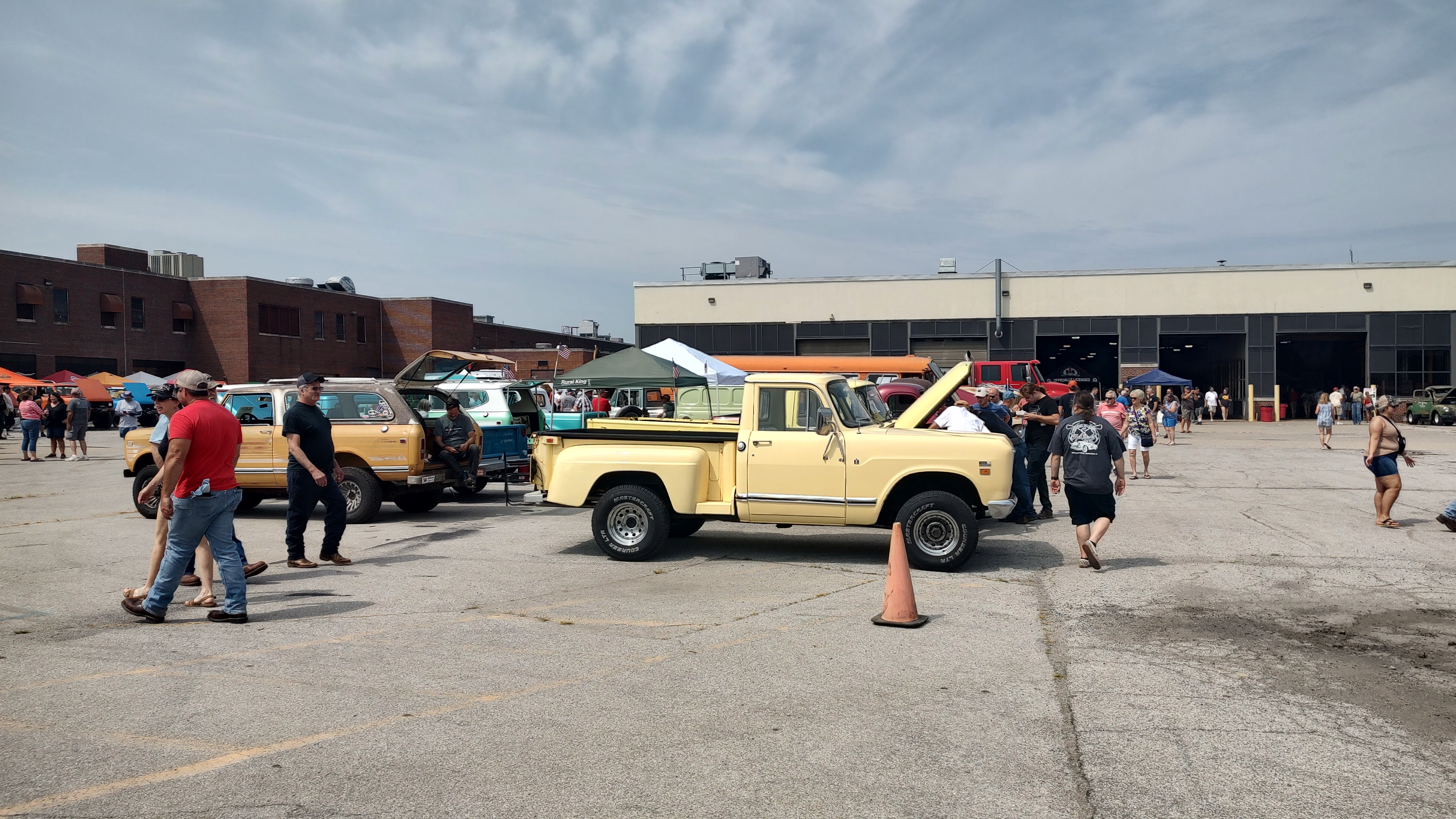
2023 Harvester Homecoming at the former International Harvester Truck Works in Fort Wayne, Indiana.

Harvester Homecoming is an annual truck festival held at the former International Harvester Truck Works in Fort Wayne, Indiana. The first festival was held in 2019 and has been held annually since in August. The event is led by Ryan DuVall, an International Harvester enthusiast.

== Background ==
International Harvester operated a plant in Fort Wayne, Indiana that operated from 1923 until 1983. It was closed during the company's downsizing and rebranding to Navistar. The complex at its peak in 1979 employed over 10,000 workers, and for decades before was the largest employer in Fort Wayne. In total, the plant produced 1.5 million trucks from 1923 to 1983. As the company downsized and rebranded to Navistar, they continued to use the offices located on the Fort Wayne complex as part of its Engineering and Design Center. Navistar fully abandoned the facility in 2015.

== History ==
The first festival was held in 2019 at 2300 Meyer Road near the original Truck Works Complex. The event was planned after Ryan DuVall wrote a piece for The Journal Gazette remembering the International Harvester legacy. In total over 500 trucks and approximately 10,000 people attended the 2019 event. DuVall said they were expecting 200 trucks with 2,000 attendees.

Thousands returned for the second festival, held in August 2020, while taking safety precautions due to the COVID-19 pandemic. At this time a museum was planned to be located in the recently vacated International Engineering and Design Center. In January 2023, a "wrenching weekend" was hosted at the complex where many volunteers and enthusiasts were invited to help restore many of the 40 vehicles held in Harvester Homecoming's collection.

== Museum ==
A museum, located in New Haven, Indiana, near the former International Harvester Truck Works, is under construction. The museum was originally planned to be in the International Engineering and Design Center. After eviction from the complex by Allen County, the organization had to build an entirely new facility at the cost of $12 million. The County purchased the building for use as county offices.
