= William R. Wood (Indiana politician) =

American politician (1861–1933)

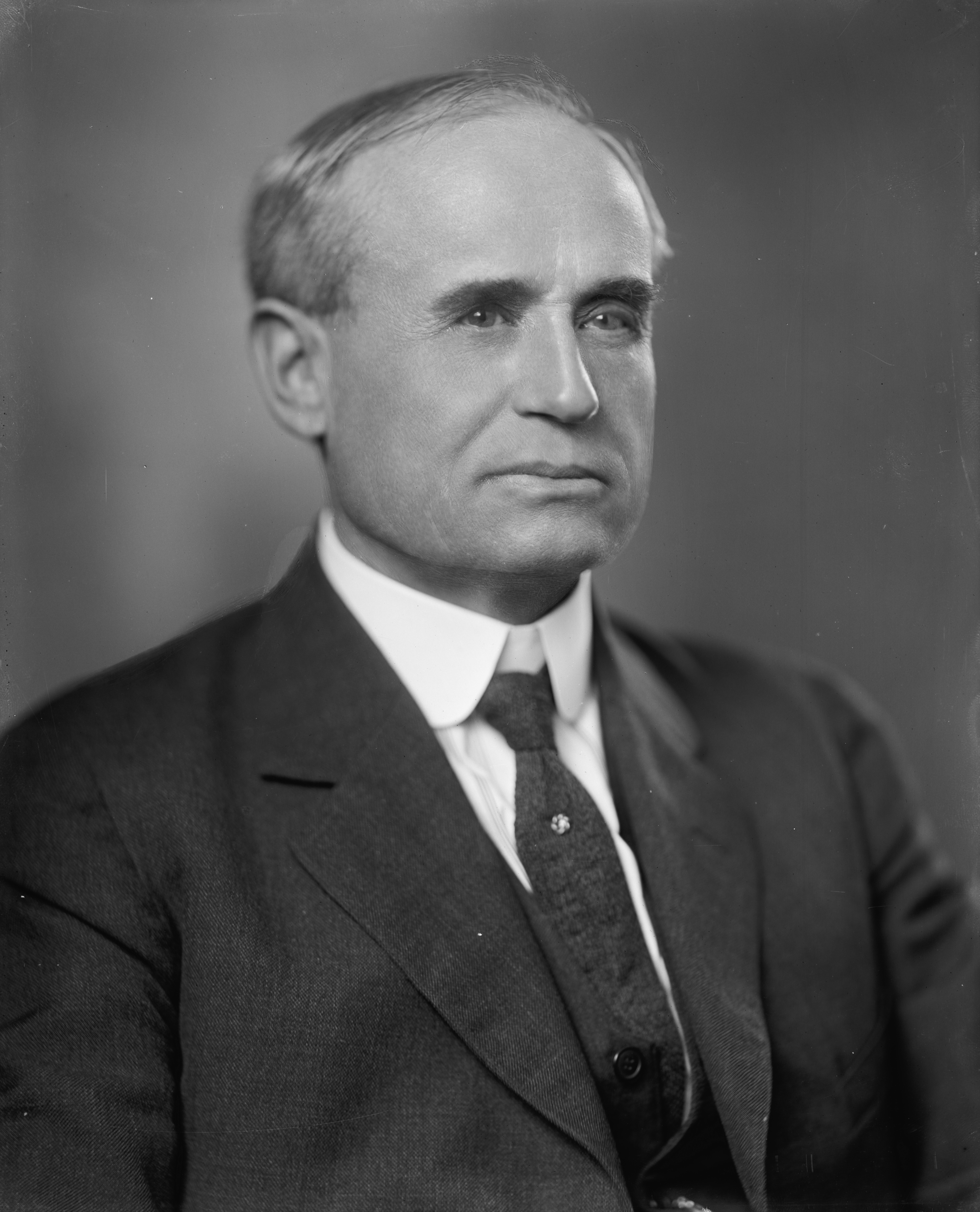
- Wood, 1905–1933

Member of the U.S. House of Representatives from Indiana's 10th district
- In office March 4, 1915 – March 3, 1933
- Preceded by: John B. Peterson
- Succeeded by: Finly H. Gray

Personal details
- Born: William Robert Wood; January 5, 1861 Oxford, Indiana, U.S.
- Died: March 7, 1933 (aged 72) New York City, New York, U.S.
- Education: University of Michigan Law School

William Robert Wood (January 5, 1861 – March 7, 1933) was an American lawyer and politician who served as a U.S. representative from Indiana from 1915 to 1933.

== Biography ==
Born in Oxford, Indiana, Wood attended the public schools of Oxford. Then he went on to college and eventually graduated from the law department of the University of Michigan in 1882. He was admitted to the bar the same year and commenced practice in Lafayette in Tippecanoe County. He served as prosecuting attorney of Tippecanoe County 1890–1894.

=== Political career ===
Wood served as a member of the Indiana Senate 1896–1914, as well as president pro tempore 1899–1907. He served as Republican floor leader of the state Senate for four sessions.

Wood was a delegate to the Republican National Conventions in 1912, 1916, 1920, and 1924. He served as chairman of the Republican National Congressional Committee from 1920 to 1933.

Wood was elected as a Republican to the Sixty-fourth and to the eight succeeding Congresses (March 4, 1915 – March 3, 1933). He served as chairman of the Committee on Appropriations (Seventy-first Congress). He was an unsuccessful candidate for reelection in 1932 to the Seventy-third Congress.

=== Death ===
Wood died while on a visit in New York City on March 7, 1933. He is interred in Spring Vale Cemetery, Lafayette, Indiana.

U.S. House of Representatives
Preceded by John B. Peterson	Member of the U.S. House of Representatives from Indiana's 10th congressional district 1915 – 1933	Succeeded by Finly H. Gray
