= William R. Rockhill =

American politician (1793–1865)

Member of the U.S. House of Representatives from Indiana's 10th district
- In office March 4, 1847 – March 3, 1849
- Preceded by: Andrew Kennedy
- Succeeded by: Andrew J. Harlan

Personal details
- Born: February 10, 1793 Burlington, New Jersey, U.S.
- Died: January 15, 1865 (aged 71) Fort Wayne, Indiana, U.S.
- Resting place: Lindenwood Cemetery
- Party: Democratic
- Spouses: Theodosia Richardson (died 1833) Eliza Ann Waugh (m. 1839; died 1845) Elizabeth Hill (m. 1848; died 1859): Emily Waugh

William R. Rockhill (February 10, 1793 – January 15, 1865) was an American politician who served one term as a U.S. representative from Indiana from 1847 to 1849.

== Early life ==
Born in Burlington, New Jersey, Rockhill attended the public schools. He moved to Fort Wayne, Indiana, in 1823. He engaged in agricultural pursuits.

== Political career ==
He served as commissioner of Allen County, Indiana, in 1825 Justice of the Peace. He served as member of the first city council of Fort Wayne and also city assessor. He served as member of the State house of representatives from 1834 to 1837. He served in the State senate from 1844 to 1847.

Rockhill was elected as a Democrat to the Thirtieth Congress (March 4, 1847 – March 3, 1849). He resumed agricultural pursuits.

== Personal life ==
William R. Rockhill was first married to Theodosia Richardson (1797–1833). Their daughter, Elizabeth (1816–1889), married Isaac DeGroff Nelson (1810–1891), and they were the parents of the Kansas City newspaper baron, William Rockhill Nelson (1841–1915). Theodosia died on Friday, August 16, 1833. On Thursday, February 14, 1839, William Rockhill married Eliza Ann Waugh (1816–1845). Eliza died on Thursday, April 24, 1845, and on Friday, September 29, 1848, William Rockhill married Elizabeth Hill (1820–1859). Elizabeth died on Monday, May 9, 1859, and William's fourth and final marriage was to Emily Waugh (1824–1903), who may have been the younger sister of Eliza Waugh. (Currently, the parents of those women are unknown.)

== Death ==
Rockhill died at Fort Wayne on January 15, 1865. He was interred in Lindenwood Cemetery.

U.S. House of Representatives
Preceded by Andrew Kennedy	Member of the U.S. House of Representatives from Indiana's 10th congressional district 1847 – 1849	Succeeded by Andrew J. Harlan
