= Edgar D. Crumpacker =

American politician

Edgar Crumpacker
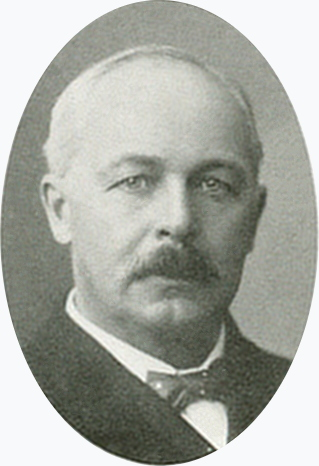

Member of the U.S. House of Representatives from Indiana's 10th district
- In office March 4, 1897 – March 3, 1913
- Preceded by: Jethro A. Hatch
- Succeeded by: John B. Peterson

Personal details
- Born: May 27, 1851 Westville, Indiana, U.S.
- Died: May 19, 1920 (aged 68) Valparaiso, Indiana, U.S
- Party: Republican
- Relatives: Maurice E. Crumpacker (son); Shepard J. Crumpacker Jr. (cousin)
- Education: Valparaiso University; Indiana University

Edgar Dean Crumpacker (May 27, 1851 – May 19, 1920) was an American lawyer and politician who served eight terms as a U.S. representative from Indiana from 1897 to 1913. He was the father of Maurice E. Crumpacker and cousin of Shepard J. Crumpacker Jr.

== Early life and education ==
Born in Westville, Indiana, Crumpacker attended the common schools and Valparaiso Academy, Valparaiso, Indiana. He studied law in the law department of Indiana University at Bloomington. He was admitted to the bar in 1876 and commenced practice in Valparaiso, Indiana.

== Career ==
He served as prosecuting attorney for the thirty-first judicial district of Indiana 1884–1888. He served as appellate judge, by appointment of Governor Hovey, from March 1891 to January 1, 1893.

=== Congress ===
Crumpacker was elected as a Republican to the Fifty-fifth and to the seven succeeding Congresses (March 4, 1897 – March 3, 1913).

He served as chairman of the Committee on the Census (Fifty-eighth through Sixty-first Congresses).

== Crumpacker Bill ==
In 1901, before his chairmanship, he attempted to invoke Section 2 of the 14th Amendment to reduce Southern states' representation in the House of Representatives because of their suppression of African American voters.

The language of the Constitution is clear, direct, and mandatory, and it leaves no discretion in Congress whatever...If the negro is not entitled to the protection of political laws, under what laws is he entitled to protection?...the violation of his rights in one particular suggests it in others. This is seen in the alarmingly frequent exhibitions of mob violence against the negro. He has no rights that the white man is bound to respect, and he may be shot down, hanged, or burned at the stake, without regard to legal procedure or sanction, with absolute impunity...Legislation can not put brains into the heads nor character into the lives of the people, but it can set in motion forces that will tend to encourage a healthy and honest growth of civil life. The crisis is on, and unless some decisive steps be taken to arrest it, the negro will slowly but surely drift into a condition practically as bad as slavery.

Specifically, Crumpacker wanted to reduce Louisiana's House seats from 7 to 4, Mississippi's from 7 to 4, North Carolina's from 9 to 6, and South Carolina's from 6 to 4. All four of those states had passed state constitutions making it nearly impossible for African Americans to vote. Crumpacker's motion to consider revising state apportionments was defeated, 94–136.

== Later career and death ==
He was an unsuccessful politician candidate for reelection in 1912 to the Sixty-third Congress losing to Democrat John B. Peterson in the 1912 United States House of Representatives elections. He resumed the practice of law in Valparaiso, Indiana, where he died May 19, 1920. He was interred in Graceland Cemetery.

U.S. House of Representatives
Preceded by Jethro A. Hatch	Member of the U.S. House of Representatives from Indiana's 10th congressional district 1897 – 1913	Succeeded by John B. Peterson
