= John U. Pettit =

American politician

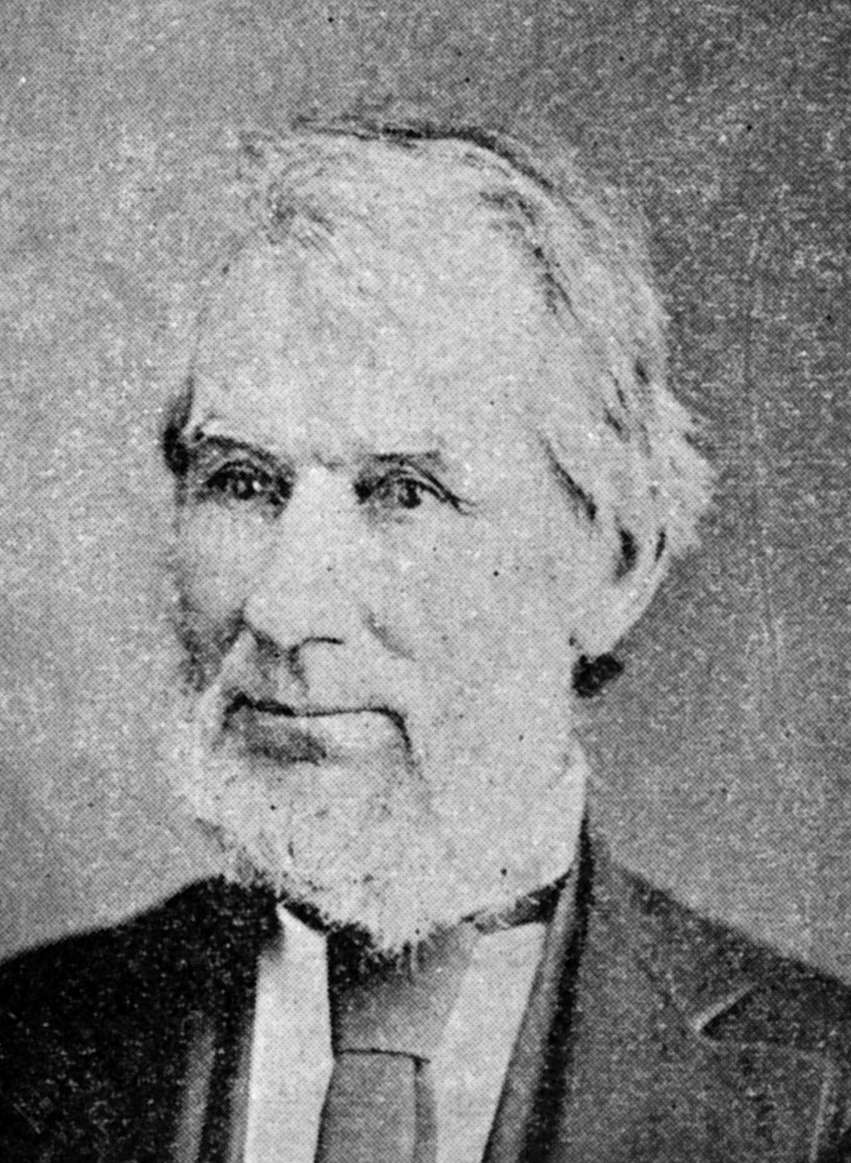

43rd Speaker of the Indiana House of Representatives
- In office November 9, 1864 – November 7, 1866
- Preceded by: Samuel H. Buskirk
- Succeeded by: David C. Branham

Member of the Indiana House of Representatives from the ? district
- In office November 9, 1864 – November 7, 1866

Member of the U.S. House of Representatives from Indiana's 11th district
- In office March 4, 1855 – March 3, 1861
- Preceded by: Andrew J. Harlan
- Succeeded by: John P. C. Shanks

Personal details
- Born: September 11, 1820 Fabius, New York, U.S.
- Died: March 21, 1881 (aged 60) Wabash, Indiana, U.S
- Party: Republican (March 4, 1857–1881)
- Other political affiliations: Indiana People's Party (1854–March 3, 1857)

John Upfold Pettit (September 11, 1820 – March 21, 1881) was an American lawyer and politician who served three terms as a U.S. representative from Indiana from 1855 to 1861.

== Biography ==
Born in Fabius, New York, Pettit attended Hamilton College in Clinton, New York, and was graduated from Union College, Schenectady, New York, in 1839. He studied law, was admitted to the bar in 1841 and commenced practice in Wabash, Indiana. Pettit served as American consul to Maranham, Brazil, from 1850 to 1853.

=== Congress ===
Pettit was elected as an Indiana People's Party candidate to the Thirty-fourth Congress and reelected as a Republican to the Thirty-fifth, and Thirty-sixth Congresses (March 4, 1855 – March 3, 1861). He served as chairman of the Committee on Expenditures in the Post Office Department (Thirty-fourth Congress).

=== Later career and death ===
He served as a member of the state house of representatives in 1865 and was elected speaker. Later, Pettit served as judge of the twenty-seventh judicial district of Indiana (1872–1880).

He died in Wabash, Indiana, March 21, 1881, and was interred in Falls Cemetery.

U.S. House of Representatives
| Preceded by Andrew J. Harlan | Member of the U.S. House of Representatives from Indiana's 11th congressional district 1855–1861 | Succeeded by John P. C. Shanks |
