= Joseph J. Davenport =

American mayor (1849–1921)

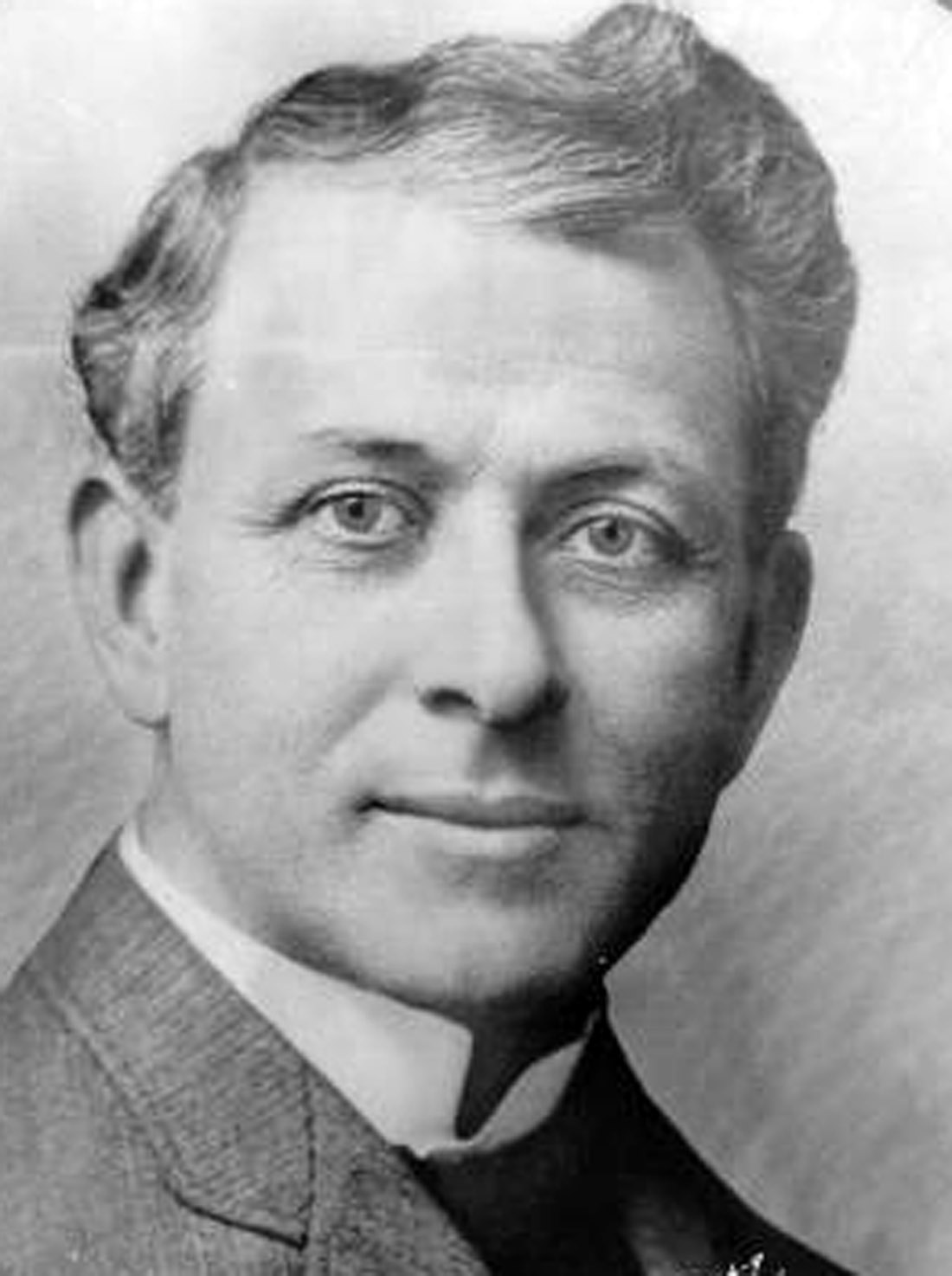

27th Mayor of Kansas City
- In office 1889 - 1890
- Preceded by: Henry C. Kumpf
- Succeeded by: Benjamin Holmes

Personal details
- Born: 1849 St. Louis, Missouri, U.S.
- Died: 1921 (aged 71–72)
- Party: Republican

Joseph Jackson Davenport (1849 – 1921) was a lawyer, realtor and Mayor of Kansas City, Missouri in 1889. He moved to Kansas City from his native Saint Louis in about 1873, joining "the pork-packing business with J. E. McKenzie," and after his term as mayor entering real estate. Following his term a new city charter was implemented and terms were extended to two years.

Davenport had a legendary encounter with Kansas City Star publisher William Rockhill Nelson in which Davenport was alleged to have gone to the publisher's office (with or without a gun according to various tellings) to settle a squabble "man to man." Managing Editor T.W. Johnston, City Editor Ralph Stout, Editorial Writer William Allen White and a telegrapher named Phillips came to Nelson's aid, threw Davenport down a flight of stairs with Davenport saying "Drop the cuspidor, Ralph Stout! Put that spittoon down!" Nelson was reported to have said. "The Star never loses!"

Davenport was born in St. Louis, Missouri and moved to Kansas City around 1873, where he engaged "the pork-packing business with J. E. McKenzie."

Political offices
Preceded by Henry C. Kumpf	Mayor of Kansas City, Missouri; 1889–1890	Succeeded by Benjamin Holmes
