= Samuel Brenton =

American politician (1810–1857)

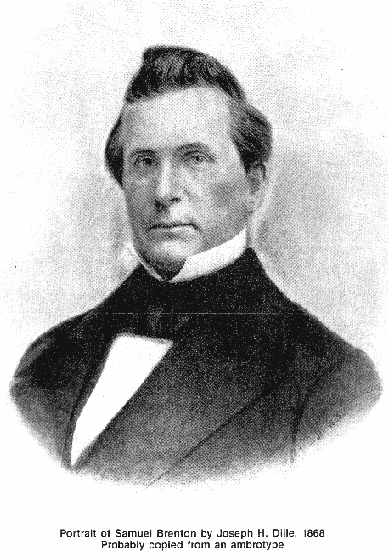

Member of the U.S. House of Representatives from Indiana's 10th district
- In office March 4, 1851 – March 3, 1853
- Preceded by: Andrew J. Harlan
- Succeeded by: Ebenezer M. Chamberlain
- In office March 4, 1855 – March 29, 1857
- Preceded by: Ebenezer M. Chamberlain
- Succeeded by: Charles Case

Personal details
- Born: November 22, 1810 Gallatin County, Kentucky, U.S.
- Died: March 29, 1857 (aged 46) Fort Wayne, Indiana, U.S.
- Party: Whig Party; Opposition Party; Republican Party

Samuel Brenton (November 22, 1810 – March 29, 1857) was a U.S. representative from Indiana; born in Gallatin County, Kentucky. He attended the public schools; was ordained to the Methodist ministry in 1830 and served as a minister; located at Danville, Indiana., in 1834 because of ill health, and studied law; member of the Indiana General Assembly in the Indiana House of Representatives (1838–1841); in 1841, returned to the ministry and served at Crawfordsville, Perryville, Lafayette, and finally at Fort Wayne, where he suffered a paralytic stroke in 1848 and was compelled to abandon his ministerial duties; appointed register of the land office at Fort Wayne on May 2, 1849, and served until July 31, 1851, when he resigned; elected as a Whig to the Thirty-second United States Congress (March 4, 1851 – March 4, 1853); unsuccessful candidate for reelection in 1852 to the Thirty-third United States Congress; elected as an Indiana People's Party candidate to the Thirty-fourth United States Congress; elected as a Republican to the Thirty-fifth United States Congress and served from March 4, 1855, until his death in Fort Wayne, Indiana; interment in Lindenwood Cemetery. He was replaced by Charles Case in a special election to finish out his term.

== See also ==
- List of members of the United States Congress who died in office (1790–1899)

U.S. House of Representatives
| Preceded by Andrew J. Harlan | Member of the U.S. House of Representatives from Indiana's 10th congressional district 1851–1853 | Succeeded by Ebenezer M. Chamberlain |
| Preceded by Ebenezer M. Chamberlain | Member of the U.S. House of Representatives from Indiana's 10th congressional district 1855–1857 | Succeeded by Charles Case |
