= Thomas Jefferson Wood =

American politician

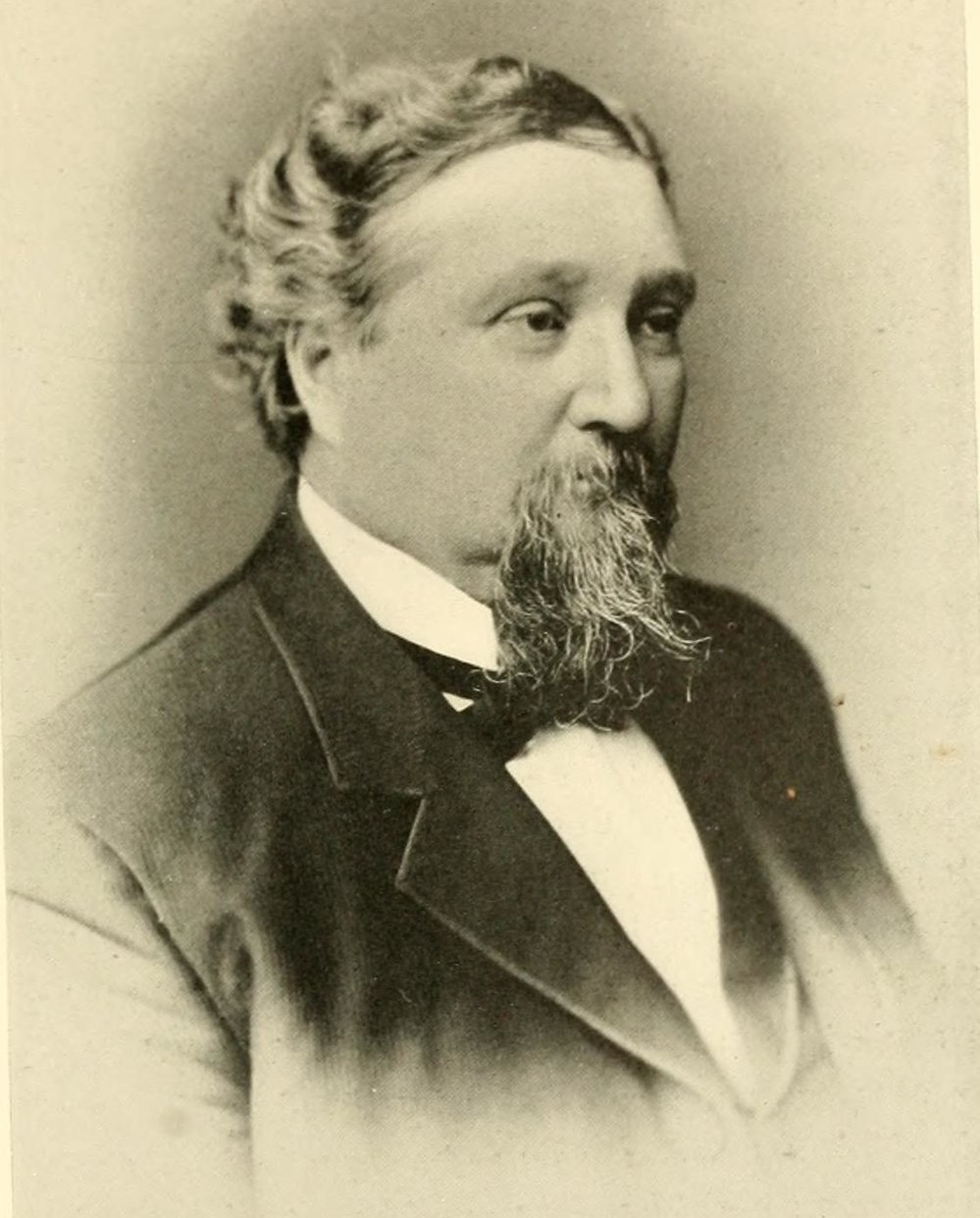
- From 1904's Encyclopedia of Genealogy and Biography of Lake County, Indiana

Member of the U.S. House of Representatives from Indiana's 10th district
- In office March 4, 1883 – March 3, 1885
- Preceded by: Mark L. De Motte
- Succeeded by: William D. Owen

Member of the Indiana Senate
- In office 1878-1882

Personal details
- Born: September 30, 1844 Athens County, Ohio
- Died: October 13, 1908 (aged 64) Crown Point, Indiana
- Resting place: Maplewood Cemetery
- Party: Democratic
- Education: University of Michigan

Thomas Jefferson Wood (September 30, 1844 in Athens County, Ohio – October 13, 1908) was an American politician who was a member of the United States House of Representatives from Indiana.

In 1853, Wood moved from his place of birth to Vigo County, Indiana, with his parents; he received his education and studied law at Terre Haute, Indiana. He graduated in law from the University of Michigan in 1867 and began practicing law. Wood moved to Crown Point, Lake County in November 1867 and practiced law there. He served as Lake County's prosecuting attorney from 1872 to 1876.

Wood was a member of the Indiana Senate from 1878 to 1882 and was elected as a Democrat to the 48th United States Congress. He served from March 4, 1883, to March 3, 1885, and was an unsuccessful candidate for reelection.

Wood was a slave owner.

U.S. House of Representatives
Preceded by Mark L. De Motte	Member of the U.S. House of Representatives from Indiana's 10th congressional district 1883 – 1885	Succeeded by William D. Owen
