= William Mitchell (Indiana politician) =

American politician

Member of the U.S. House of Representatives from Indiana's 10th district
- In office March 4, 1861 – March 3, 1863
- Preceded by: Charles Case
- Succeeded by: Joseph K. Edgerton

Personal details
- Born: January 19, 1807 Root, New York, U.S.
- Died: September 11, 1865 (aged 58) Macon, Georgia, U.S
- Party: Republican
- Relatives: Thomas B. Mitchell (brother); George A. Mitchell (brother)

William Mitchell (January 19, 1807 – September 11, 1865) was an American lawyer and politician who served one term as a United States representative from Indiana from 1861 to 1863.

== Early life and career ==
He was born in Root, New York where he attended the public schools. Later, he studied law and was admitted to the bar in 1836. He moved to Kendallville, Indiana, and was one of its founding fathers.

He had a role in the founding of the Grand Rapids and Indiana Railroad. It provided a means of opening up northern Michigan for development of towns and cities.

Mitchell practiced law in Kendallville and served as the first postmaster for the town from 1836 to 1846.

== Political career ==
He was a member of the Indiana House of Representatives in 1841 and a justice of the peace.

=== Congress ===
He was elected as a Republican to the Thirty-seventh Congress (March 4, 1861 – March 3, 1863) but was an unsuccessful candidate for reelection in 1862 to the Thirty-eighth Congress.

== Later career and death ==
After leaving Congress, he engaged in the cotton business. He died in Macon, Georgia in 1865 and was buried in Lake View Cemetery, Kendallville, Indiana.

New York State Senator Thomas B. Mitchell (died 1876) was his brother. He also had another brother George A. Mitchell.

== Sources ==
- United States Congress. "William Mitchell (id: M000830)". Biographical Directory of the United States Congress.

U.S. House of Representatives
| Preceded by Charles Case | Member of the U.S. House of Representatives from Indiana's 10th congressional district 1861 - 1863 | Succeeded by Joseph K. Edgerton |
