= Isaac De Groff Nelson =

American politician

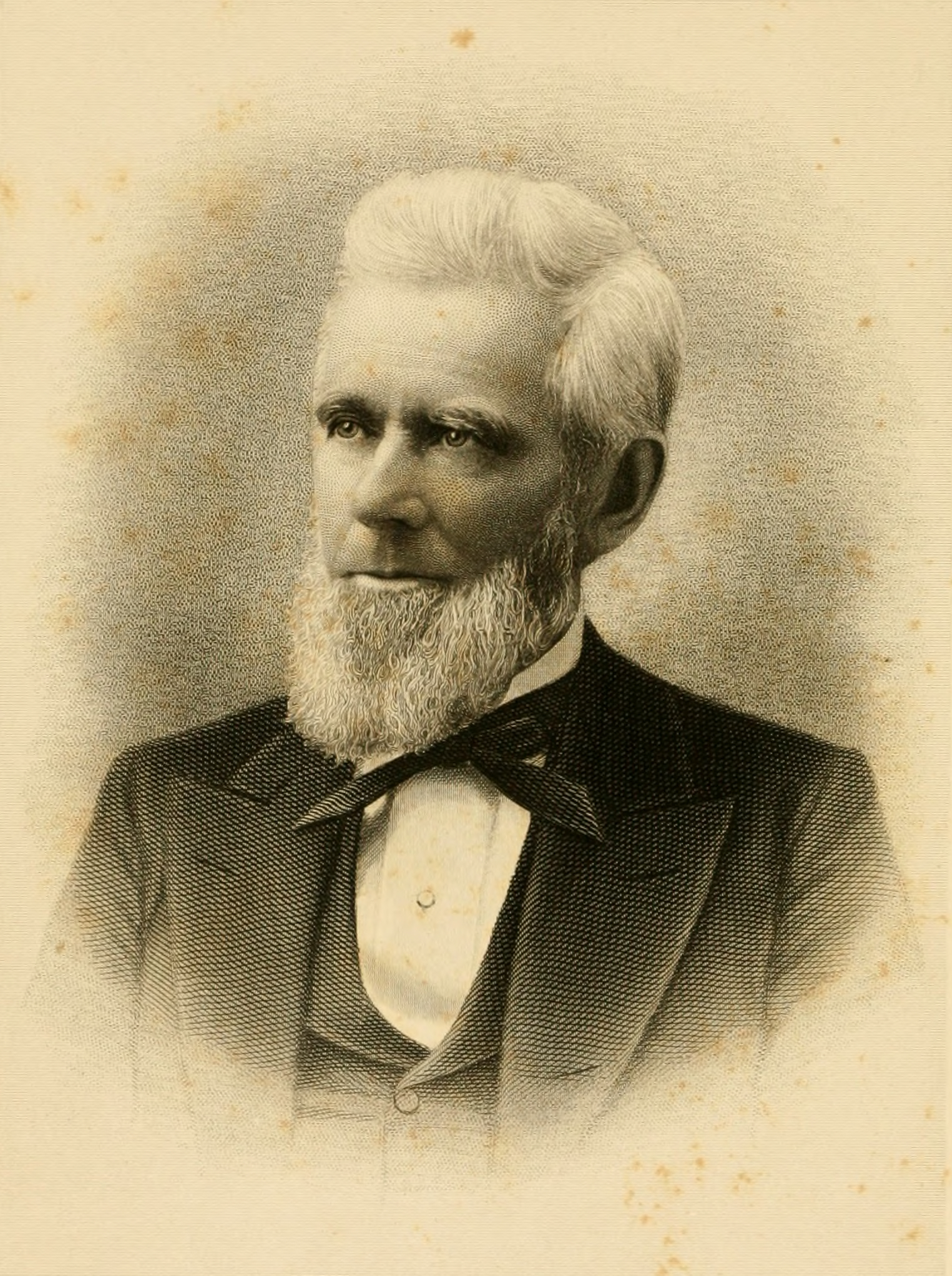
I. D. G. Nelson

Isaac De Groff Nelson (July 2, 1810 – March 24, 1891) was an early pioneer in Indiana, where he owned a newspaper, held several political offices, and became the father of newspaperman William Rockhill Nelson.

I. D. G. Nelson was born in New York state on July 2, 1810. In 1836, he moved to Fort Wayne, arriving via steamer along the newly opened Wabash and Erie Canal. Nelson bought the Fort Wayne Sentinel from George W. Wood in 1840 and turned it from a Whig paper to an organ of the Democratic Party. In 1851 he was elected as a representative from Allen County, Indiana to the Indiana General Assembly, where he helped pass the Nelson railroad bill. In 1852, he also helped organize the Wabash Railroad Company. Nelson served in various state government roles, including an 1854 appointment as clerk of the Allen circuit court, a member of the first board of trustees of Purdue University, and in 1877, he helped oversee the construction of the Indianapolis state house under Governor James D. Williams.

Nelson also renowned as a nursery owner. His own estate, "Elm Park" was considered "the showplace of Allen County." Nelson lived in Elm Park, and had great fondness for horticulture. Nelson helped to incorporate Lindenwood Cemetery in Fort Wayne, where a monument was built to him. He was also a member of the National Pomological Society.

Nelson died March 24, 1891.
