= Joseph K. Edgerton =

American politician

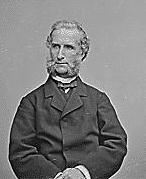

Member of the U.S. House of Representatives from Indiana's 10th district
- In office March 4, 1863 – March 3, 1865
- Preceded by: William Mitchell
- Succeeded by: Joseph H. Defrees

Personal details
- Born: Joseph Ketchum Edgerton; February 16, 1818 Vergennes, Vermont, U.S.
- Died: August 25, 1893 (aged 75) Boston, Massachusetts, U.S.
- Resting place: Fort Wayne's Lindenwood Cemetery
- Party: Democrat
- Relatives: Alfred Peck Edgerton (brother)

Joseph Ketchum Edgerton (February 16, 1818 – August 25, 1893) was an American lawyer and politician who served one term as a U.S. representative from Indiana from 1863 to 1865.

== Early life and career ==
Born in Vergennes, Vermont, Edgerton attended the public schools of Clinton County, New York. He graduated from Plattsburgh Academy, which his older brother Alfred Peck Edgerton had also attended. Joseph Edgerton read the law with an established firm and was admitted to the bar.

In 1839 he commenced practice in New York City. In 1844 Edgerton moved to Fort Wayne, Indiana, where he continued to practice.

In 1854 he became a member of the board of directors for the Fort Wayne and Chicago Railroad, and later was selected as its president. Edgerton also served as president of the Grand Rapids and Indiana Railroad and the Ohio Railroad, which were constructed to connect major cities of the Midwest, especially the booming industrial city of Chicago, through which many natural resources flowed to the East.

== Congress ==
A Democrat, Edgerton was elected to the United States House of Representatives in 1862 and served in the Thirty-eighth Congress, March 4, 1863, to March 3, 1865. His vote on the Thirteenth Amendment is recorded as nay. He was an unsuccessful candidate for reelection in 1864 and returned to his business interests.

== Death ==
Edgerton died in Boston, Massachusetts, on August 25, 1893. His body was returned to Indiana, where he was interred at Fort Wayne's Lindenwood Cemetery.

== Family ==
His older brother Alfred Peck Edgerton was elected to Congress for two terms from Ohio. After his death in 1897, his family arranged for his burial to also occur in Lindenwood Cemetery.

U.S. House of Representatives
| Preceded by William Mitchell | Member of the U.S. House of Representatives from Indiana's 10th congressional district 1863–1865 | Succeeded by Joseph H. Defrees |
