= Ebenezer M. Chamberlain =

American politician

Ebenezer Mattoon Chamberlain
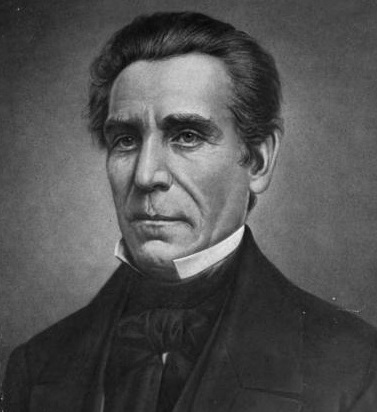
- E. M. Chamberlain, Congressman from Indiana

Member of the U.S. House of Representatives from Indiana's 10th district
- In office March 4, 1853 – March 3, 1855
- Preceded by: Samuel Brenton
- Succeeded by: Samuel Brenton

Member of the Indiana Senate
- In office 1839-1842

Member of the Indiana House of Representatives
- In office 1835-1837

Personal details
- Born: August 20, 1805 Orrington, Maine
- Died: March 14, 1861 (aged 55) Goshen, Indiana
- Party: Democratic Party
- Occupation: Lawyer

Ebenezer Mattoon Chamberlain (August 20, 1805 – March 14, 1861) was an American lawyer and politician who served one term as a U.S. representative from Indiana 1853 to 1855.

== Early life and career ==
Born in Orrington, Maine, Chamberlain attended public school before becoming employed in his father's shipyard. Later, he studied law and moved to Connersville, where he completed his studies, gaining admission to the bar in 1832 and commencing practice in Elkhart County in 1833.

He served as member of the Indiana House of Representatives from 1835 to 1837, before serving in the state Senate from 1839 to 1842.

Chamberlain was elected prosecuting attorney of the ninth judicial circuit in 1842 and became elected president judge of the ninth judicial district in 1843. He was reelected in 1851 and served until he resigned when he was elected to Congress. He served as a delegate to the Democratic National Convention in 1844.

== Congress ==
Chamberlain was elected as a Democrat to the Thirty-third Congress from March 4, 1853, to March 3, 1855). Afterwards, he practiced of law in Goshen, until his death.

== Death ==
He died in Goshen on March 14, 1861, and was interred in Oak Ridge Cemetery.

U.S. House of Representatives
Preceded by Samuel Brenton	Member of the U.S. House of Representatives from Indiana's 10th congressional district 1853 – 1855	Succeeded by Samuel Brenton
