= Jethro A. Hatch =

American politician

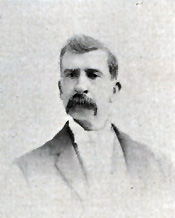

Member of the U.S. House of Representatives from Indiana's 10th district
- In office March 4, 1895 – March 3, 1897
- Preceded by: Thomas Hammond
- Succeeded by: Edgar D. Crumpacker

Indiana House of Representatives
- In office 1872–1873

Personal details
- Born: Jethro Ayers Hatch; June 18, 1837 Pitcher, New York, US
- Died: August 3, 1912 (aged 75) Victoria, Texas, US
- Party: Republican
- Spouse: Sarah Melissa Shaeffer
- Children: Darwin Shaeffer Hatch; Hazel Margaret Hatch
- Parent(s): Jethro Hatch; Minerva Pierce
- Education: Rush Medical College
- Occupation: Physician and Politician

Jethro Ayers Hatch (June 18, 1837 – August 3, 1912) was an American physician and politician who served one term as a U.S. representative from Indiana from 1895 to 1897.

== Early life and ancestors ==
Hatch was born on June 18, 1837, in Pitcher, New York, the son of Jethro Hatch Sr. and Minerva Pierce, the daughter of Gordon Pierce and Thirza Smalley. He was the grandson of Timothy Hatch, one of the Proprietors and Pioneers of Sherburne, New York. Timothy's wife was Ruth Welles, the sister of Martha Welles, wife of the Rev. Blackleach Burritt, and a direct descendant of Gov.Thomas Welles, the Fourth Colonial Governor of Connecticut and the transcriber of the Fundamental Orders into the official colony records of Connecticut.

Hatch settled in Sugar Grove, Illinois, in 1847 with his parents and four siblings, being pioneers of Kane County, Illinois.

== Marriage and family ==
Hatch married on May 26, 1881, in Kentland, Indiana, Sarah Melissa Shaeffer, the daughter of Gilbert and Margaret Shaeffer of Lancaster, Ohio. They were the parents of two children:

- Darwin Shaeffer Hatch, a graduate of Purdue University, and a writer and Editor in Chief of Motor Age Magazine, later purchased by the Walt Disney Company
- Hazel Margaret Hatch, a 1902 graduate of Ferry Hall School, Lake Forest, Illinois, and a 1906 graduate of Indiana University. She married Claude Seymore Steele, a graduate of Northwestern University, Evanston, Illinois. He served as a Senator in the Indiana Senate, the upper house of the Indiana General Assembly.

== Education and career ==
Hatch attended the common schools and graduated from Batavia Institute in Batavia, Illinois. He was graduated from Rush Medical College, Chicago, Illinois, in February 1860 and commenced practice at Kentland, Indiana, in July 1860. He was the first physician to locate in Kentland, Indiana in 1861 and practiced until 1862, when he was commissioned Assistant Surgeon of the 36th Illinois Volunteer Infantry Regiment, afterward promoted to be Surgeon, and continued until the close of the war, and was mustered out on October 8, 1865.

Hatch served as a local health officer. He also served as secretary and later president of the pension examining board 1865–1907. He served as member of board of the hospital for the insane at Logansport, Indiana. He also served as a physician and surgeon for the Logansport division of the Pennsylvania Railroad for many years as well as for the Chicago and Cairo division of the New York Central Railroad from the time it was built until 1907.

== Politics ==
=== Indiana State politics ===
Hatch served as member of the Indiana House of Representatives from 1872 to 1873.

=== Congress ===
Hatch was elected as a Republican to the Fifty-fourth Congress (March 4, 1895 – March 3, 1897), serving Indiana's 10th congressional district. He was not a candidate for renomination in 1896.

Hatch returned to Kentland, Indiana, and resumed the practice of medicine.

== Death ==
Hatch moved to Victoria, Texas, in 1907 and engaged in the real estate business. He died in Victoria on August 3, 1912, at the age of 75.

== Notes ==
U.S. House of Representatives
Preceded by Thomas Hammond	Member of the U.S. House of Representatives from Indiana's 10th congressional district 1895 – 1897	Succeeded by Edgar D. Crumpacker
