= Ralph Harvey =

American politician (1901–1991)

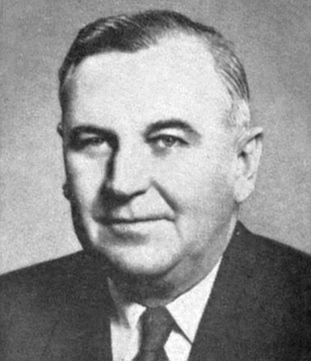

Member of the U.S. House of Representatives from Indiana's 10th district
- In office January 3, 1961 – December 30, 1966
- Preceded by: Randall S. Harmon
- Succeeded by: Richard L. Roudebush
- In office November 4, 1947 – January 3, 1959
- Preceded by: Raymond S. Springer
- Succeeded by: Randall S. Harmon

Member of the Indiana House of Representatives from the ? district
- In office 1942–1947

Personal details
- Born: August 9, 1901 Mount Summit, Indiana, U.S.
- Died: November 7, 1991 (aged 90) Fort Lauderdale, Florida, U.S
- Party: Republican
- Education: Purdue University

Ralph Harvey (August 9, 1901 – November 7, 1991) was an American politician who served six terms as a U.S. representative from Indiana from 1947 to 1959, then again for three more terms from 1961 to 1966.

== Biography ==
Born on a farm near Mount Summit, Indiana, Harvey attended the public schools. He graduated from Purdue University, Lafayette, Indiana, 1923. He was an agricultural instructor and a farmer. Additionally, he served as county councilman from 1932 to 1942 and as a member of the Indiana House of Representatives from 1942 to 1947.

=== Congress ===
Harvey was elected as a Republican to the Eightieth Congress to fill the vacancy caused by the death of fellow Republican Raymond S. Springer. Re-elected to the five succeeding Congresses (November 4, 1947 – January 3, 1959), he was unsuccessful for re-election in 1958, losing by about one-and-a-half points.

In 1960 Harvey defeated the Democrat who had best him and was elected as a Republican to the Eighty-seventh and to the two succeeding Congresses and served from January 3, 1961, until his resignation on December 30, 1966. He was unsuccessful for renomination earlier in 1966 after being redistricted into a new district with another Republican, Richard L. Roudebush.

Harvey voted in favor of the Civil Rights Acts of 1957 and 1964, as well as the 24th Amendment to the U.S. Constitution, but did not vote on the Voting Rights Act of 1965. Harvey served on the Agriculture Committee for seven terms. He was active on the House floor, but was not a sponsor of a single enacted public bill. His autobiography shows a passion for junkets, devoting one-third of its pages to seven of them.

=== Death ===
He died on November 7, 1991, in Fort Lauderdale, Florida.

U.S. House of Representatives
Preceded by Raymond S. Springer	Member of the U.S. House of Representatives from Indiana's 10th congressional district 1947 – 1959	Succeeded by Randall S. Harmon
Preceded by Randall S. Harmon	Member of the U.S. House of Representatives from Indiana's 10th congressional district 1961 – 1966	Succeeded by Richard L. Roudebush
