= Henry B. Sayler =

American politician (1836–1900)

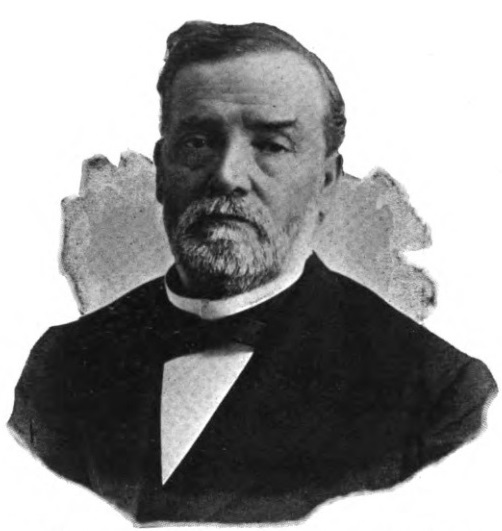

Member of the U.S. House of Representatives from Indiana's 10th district
- In office March 4, 1873 – March 3, 1875
- Preceded by: William Williams
- Succeeded by: William S. Haymond

Personal details
- Born: Henry Benton Saylor; March 31, 1836 Montgomery County, Ohio, U.S.
- Died: June 18, 1900 (aged 64) Huntington, Indiana, U.S.
- Resting place: Mount Hope Cemetery
- Party: Republican

Military service
- Battles/wars: American Civil War

Henry Benton Sayler (March 31, 1836 – June 18, 1900) was an American lawyer, Civil War veteran, and politician who served one term as a U.S. representative from Indiana from 1873 to 1875. He was a cousin of Milton Sayler, who also served in the U.S. House of Representatives.

== Biography ==
Born in Montgomery County, Ohio, Sayler moved to Clinton County, Indiana. He attended the common schools of the county. He studied law. He was admitted to the bar in 1856 and commenced practice in Eaton, Ohio.

=== Civil War ===
During the Civil War served in the Union Army as lieutenant, captain, and major.

=== Congress ===
Sayler was elected as a Republican to the Forty-third Congress (March 4, 1873 – March 3, 1875). He was not a candidate for renomination in 1874.

=== Later career and death ===
He served as judge of the twenty-eighth judicial circuit court of Indiana from 1875 to 1900. He died in Huntington, Indiana, June 18, 1900 and was interred in Mount Hope Cemetery.

U.S. House of Representatives
Preceded by William Williams	Member of the U.S. House of Representatives from Indiana's 10th congressional district 1873–1875	Succeeded by William S. Haymond
