= Andrew Kennedy (American politician) =

American politician (1810–1847)

Member of the U.S. House of Representatives from Indiana
- In office March 4, 1841 – March 3, 1847
- Preceded by: James Rariden (5th); District established (10th)
- Succeeded by: William J. Brown (5th); William R. Rockhill (10th)
- Constituency: 5th district (1841-33); 10th district (1843-47)

Personal details
- Born: July 24, 1810 Dayton, Ohio, U.S.
- Died: December 31, 1847 (aged 37) Indianapolis, Indiana, U.S
- Party: Democratic
- Relatives: Case Broderick (cousin)

Andrew Kennedy (July 24, 1810 – December 31, 1847) was an American lawyer and politician who served three terms as a U.S. representative from Indiana from 1841 to 1847.

He was a cousin of Case Broderick.

== Biography ==
Born in Dayton, Ohio, Kennedy moved with his parents to a farm on the Indian reserve near Lafayette, Indiana. He soon afterward moved to Connersville, Indiana, where he became a blacksmith's apprentice. Kennedy attended the common schools and later studied law. He was admitted to the bar in 1833 and commenced practice in Connersville.

Kennedy then moved to Muncie (then Muncytown or Muncietown), Indiana, in 1834 and continued the practice of law. He served as member of the Indiana House of Representatives in 1835 and served in the Indiana Senate in 1838.

=== Congress ===
Kennedy was elected as a Democrat to the Twenty-seventh, Twenty-eighth, and Twenty-ninth Congresses (March 4, 1841 – March 3, 1847).

=== Death ===
He served as Democratic caucus nominee for United States Senator in 1847. He was stricken with smallpox on the eve of the legislative joint convention and died in Indianapolis, Indiana, December 31, 1847.

He was interred in Greenlawn Cemetery. He was reinterred in Beech Grove Cemetery, Muncie, Indiana.

U.S. House of Representatives
Preceded by James Rariden	Member of the U.S. House of Representatives from Indiana's 5th congressional district 1841 – 1843	Succeeded by William J. Brown
New district	Member of the U.S. House of Representatives from Indiana's 10th congressional district 1843 – 1847	Succeeded by William R. Rockhill
