= Randall S. Harmon =

American politician

Randall Harmon
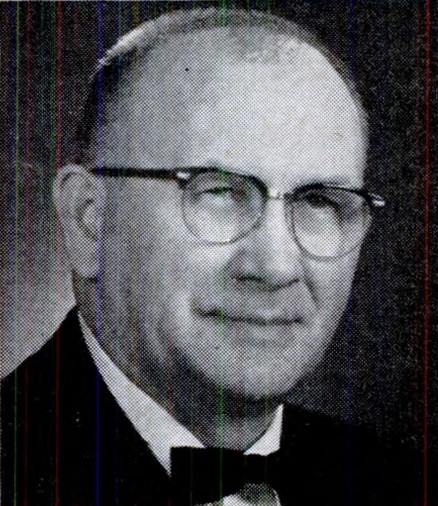

Member of the U.S. House of Representatives from Indiana's 10th district
- In office January 3, 1959 – January 3, 1961
- Preceded by: Ralph Harvey
- Succeeded by: Ralph Harvey

Personal details
- Born: July 10, 1903 North Vernon, Indiana, U.S.
- Died: August 19, 1982 (aged 79)
- Party: Democratic

Randall S. "Front Porch" Harmon (July 19, 1903 – August 18, 1982) was a U.S. representative from Indiana.

Harmon was born in North Vernon, Indiana and he graduated from North Vernon High School. Harmon also took extension courses in law and tool engineering. He was employed as a tool engineer with Delco Battery Operations in Muncie, Indiana from 1933 to 1959.

Harmon ran for Congress seven times from 1944 to 1956, running from 1944 to 1952 as a Republican and in 1954 and 1956 as a Democrat. He failed to win a Congressional primary once during this time.

Due to the Democratic party's landslide victory in the 1958 Congressional elections, Harmon was elected to Congress, defeating incumbent Ralph Harvey. During his term in office, Harmon attracted controversy by putting his wife on the Congressional payroll and declaring his front porch a Congressional district office. Harmon also explored the possibility of running for president in 1960, but he refused to spend money on such a candidacy, and never proceeded to run. Harmon won his primary with 30% of the vote in a field of nine candidates. In the general election, he campaigned with a replica of a front porch on a truck, Harmon lost his bid for re-election in 1960 to Ralph Harvey.

After leaving office, Harmon campaigned for Congress in 1962. He then attempted to run for Congress in 1964, but he filed for Congress and the Delaware County Council, and the state ruled that he could run for neither office. Harmon then ran for Congress eight more times from 1968 to 1982, failing to get out of the primary once, before dying in August 1982.

== Notes ==
U.S. House of Representatives
Preceded by Ralph Harvey	Member of the U.S. House of Representatives from Indiana's 10th congressional district 1959–1961	Succeeded by Ralph Harvey
