= Joseph H. Defrees =

American politician (1812–1995)

Joseph DeFrees
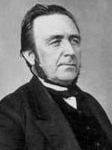

Member of the U.S. House of Representatives from Indiana's 10th district
- In office March 4, 1865 – March 3, 1867
- Preceded by: Joseph K. Edgerton
- Succeeded by: William Williams

Indiana State Representative
- In office 1872
- In office 1850–1854

Elkhart County Sheriff
- In office 1835–1840

Personal details
- Born: May 13, 1812 Sparta, Tennessee, US
- Died: December 21, 1885 (aged 73) Goshen, Indiana, US
- Party: Republican
- Profession: Business

Joseph Hutton DeFrees (May 13, 1812 – December 21, 1885) was an American businessman and politician who served one term as a U.S. representative from Indiana from 1865 to 1867.

His brother, John D. Defrees, was a major figure in Indiana Republican party politics.

== Biography ==
Born in Sparta, Tennessee, DeFrees moved to Ohio with his parents, who settled in Piqua, Ohio in 1819. He attended the common schools. Defrees was an apprentice to the blacksmith trade from 1826 to 1829, and learned the art of printing. He moved to Indiana and settled in South Bend in 1831, where he established the Northwestern Pioneer. He moved to Goshen, Indiana, in 1833 and engaged in mercantile pursuits and later in banking.

Defrees served as sheriff of Elkhart County between 1835 and 1840. He was a member of the Indiana House of Representatives in 1849, then served in the Indiana Senate between 1850 and 1854. He returned to the state house in 1872.

=== Congress ===
DeFrees was elected as a Republican to the Thirty-ninth Congress (March 4, 1865 – March 3, 1867). He was not a candidate for renomination in 1866.

=== Later career and death ===
He resumed his former business pursuits. He was also interested in milling, the manufacture of linseed oil, and the construction of the Goshen Hydraulic Works. He served as director of the Cincinnati, Wabash & Michigan Railroad and served as its first president.

He died at Goshen, Indiana, December 21, 1885. He was interred in Oak Ridge Cemetery.

U.S. House of Representatives
Preceded by Joseph K. Edgerton	Member of the U.S. House of Representatives from Indiana's 10th congressional district 1865 – 1867	Succeeded by William Williams
