= William S. Haymond =

American politician (1823–1885)

William Haymond
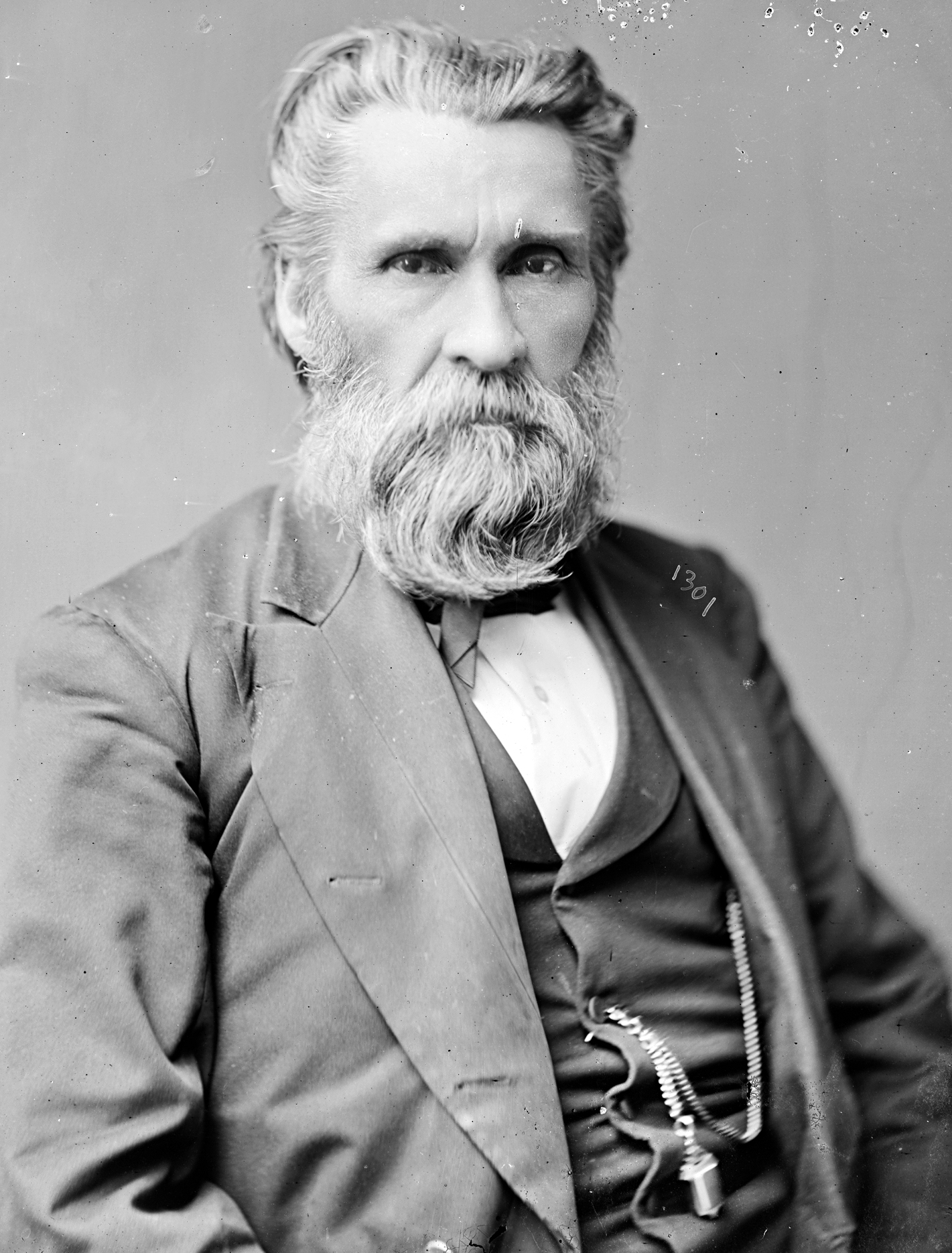

Member of the U.S. House of Representatives from Indiana's 8th district
- In office March 4, 1875 – March 3, 1877
- Preceded by: Henry B. Sayler
- Succeeded by: William H. Calkins

Personal details
- Born: February 20, 1823
- Died: December 24, 1885 (aged 62) Indianapolis, Indiana, U.S
- Resting place: Crown Hill Cemetery, Indianapolis, Indiana, Section 34, Lot 132; 39.8194442°N 86.1679605°W
- Party: Democratic

Military service
- Branch/service: U.S. Army (Union Army)
- Battles/wars: American Civil War

William Summerville Haymond (February 20, 1823 – December 24, 1885) was an American medical doctor and Civil War veteran who served one term as a U.S. representative from Indiana from 1875 to 1877.

== Biography ==
Born near Clarksburg, Virginia (now West Virginia), Haymond attended the common schools and was graduated from Bellevue Hospital Medical College, New York City. He commenced the practice of his profession at Monticello, Indiana, in 1852. During the Civil War entered the Union Army as a surgeon in 1862 and served one year.

He was an unsuccessful candidate for the State senate in 1866. He served as president of the Indianapolis, Delphi & Chicago Railroad Co. 1872–1874.

=== Congress ===
Haymond was elected as a Democrat to the Forty-fourth Congress (March 4, 1875 – March 4, 1877). He was an unsuccessful candidate for reelection in 1876 to the Forty-fifth Congress.

=== Later career and death ===
He resumed his former professional and business activities. Organized the Central Medical College in Indianapolis in 1877 and was dean until his death. Published in 1879 a history of Indiana.

He died in Indianapolis, Indiana, December 24, 1885. He was interred in Crown Hill Cemetery.

U.S. House of Representatives
Preceded by Henry B. Sayler	Member of the U.S. House of Representatives from Indiana's 10th congressional district 1875–1877	Succeeded by William H. Calkins
