= Thomas Hammond (Indiana politician) =

American politician

Member of the U.S. House of Representatives from Indiana's 10th district
- In office March 4, 1893 – March 3, 1895
- Preceded by: David Henry Patton
- Succeeded by: Jethro A. Hatch

Personal details
- Born: February 27, 1843 Fitchburg, Massachusetts, U.S.
- Died: September 21, 1909 (aged 66) Hammond, Indiana, U.S.
- Resting place: Oak Hill Cemetery
- Party: Democratic Party

Thomas Hammond (February 27, 1843 – September 21, 1909) was an American businessman and politician who served two terms as a U.S. representative from Indiana from 1893 to 1895.

== Biography ==
Born in Fitchburg, Massachusetts, Hammond attended the common schools. He engaged in carpentry and contracting work until twenty-one years of age. He moved to Detroit, Michigan, and engaged in the packing-house business. He moved to Hammond, Indiana, in 1876 and assisted in the establishment of the dressed-beef industry. Specifically, he managed the tripe operation at the State Line Slaughterhouse, an abattoir on the south banks of the Grand Calumet River. This meat packing operation was co-founded by his brother, George H. Hammond. The tripe subsector of the meat-packing industry was a new development at this time.

=== Early political career ===
He served as an original member of the Hammond City Council. He then served as the second mayor of Hammond from 1888 to 1893. Marcus M. Towle Sr., his brother's former business partner and Hammond's first mayor, was the man Hammond defeated in the 1888 mayoral election. It was under his mayorship the city's first proper municipal water system was implemented. At the time, Hammond was still dependent on less-than-desirable artesian water sources.

=== Congress ===
Hammond was elected as a Democrat to the Fifty-third Congress (March 4, 1893 – March 3, 1895). He earned the nickname "Honest Tom" during his political career. He was not a candidate for renomination in 1894.

=== Later career and death ===
He resumed his former business pursuits. He also engaged in the real estate business and banking. He served as president of the Commercial Bank of Hammond 1892–1907. He was appointed by Governor Hanly a member of the Metropolitan Police Board.

He died in Hammond, Indiana, September 21, 1909. He was interred in Oak Hill Cemetery.

U.S. House of Representatives
| Preceded by David H. Patton | Member of the U.S. House of Representatives from Indiana's 10th congressional district 1893 – 1895 | Succeeded by Jethro A. Hatch |
