= Mark L. De Motte =

American politician

Mark De Motte
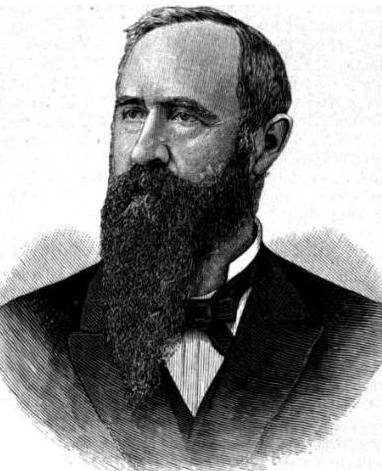

Member of the U.S. House of Representatives from Indiana's 10th district
- In office March 4, 1881 – March 3, 1883
- Preceded by: William H. Calkins
- Succeeded by: Thomas Jefferson Wood

Personal details
- Born: December 28, 1832 Rockville, Indiana, US
- Died: September 23, 1908 (aged 75) Valparaiso, Indiana, US
- Party: Republican
- Education: De Pauw University

Mark Lindsey De Motte (December 28, 1832 – September 23, 1908) was an American lawyer, Civil War veteran, and politician who served one term as a U.S. representative from Indiana from 1881 to 1883. He was also a lawyer, law school dean, newspaper editor and postmaster. The town of DeMotte, Indiana was named after him during his term in Congress.

== Biography ==
Born in Rockville, Indiana, De Motte pursued preparatory studies. He graduated from the literary department of Indiana Asbury (now De Pauw) University, Greencastle, Indiana, in 1853 and from the law department of the same university in 1855. He was admitted to the bar and began practice in Valparaiso in 1855. De Motte was elected prosecuting attorney of the sixty-seventh judicial district in 1856.

=== Civil War ===
He served in the Union Army with the rank of first lieutenant in 1861. He was promoted to captain in 1862.In 1865, he was promoted to Colonel, and while he left the service later that year, he continued to be referred to as "Colonel DeMotte" throughout his life.

=== Career ===
At the close of the war he moved to Lexington, Missouri, and resumed the practice of law. He was editor and proprietor of the Lexington Register. He was an unsuccessful Republican candidate for election to Congress in 1872 and 1876. He served as a delegate to the Republican National Convention in 1876. He returned to Valparaiso, Indiana, in 1877 and resumed the practice of law. He organized the Northern Indiana Law School (later Valparaiso University School of Law) in 1879.

=== Congress ===
De Motte was elected as a Republican to the Forty-seventh Congress (March 4, 1881 – March 3, 1883). He was an unsuccessful candidate for reelection in 1882 to the Forty-eighth Congress.

=== Later career and death ===
He served as member of the Indiana State Senate from 1886 to 1890. He was appointed postmaster of Valparaiso on March 24, 1890, and served until March 20, 1894. He was dean of the Northern Indiana Law School from 1890 to 1908.

He died in Valparaiso, Indiana, on September 23, 1908, and was interred in Maplewood Cemetery.

U.S. House of Representatives
Preceded by William H. Calkins	Member of the U.S. House of Representatives from Indiana's 10th congressional district 1881–1883	Succeeded by Thomas Jefferson Wood
