= Andrew J. Harlan =

American politician and lawyer

Andrew Harlan
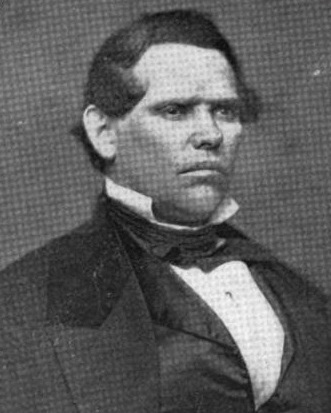

21st Speaker of the Missouri House of Representatives
- In office 1866–1868
- Preceded by: Walter L. Lovelace
- Succeeded by: John C. Orrick

Member of the Missouri House of Representatives from the ? district
- In office 1864–1868

Member of the U.S. House of Representatives from Indiana's 11th district
- In office March 4, 1853 – March 3, 1855
- Preceded by: District created
- Succeeded by: John U. Pettit

Member of the U.S. House of Representatives from Indiana's 10th district
- In office March 4, 1849 – March 3, 1851
- Preceded by: William R. Rockhill
- Succeeded by: Samuel Brenton

Personal details
- Born: March 29, 1815 near Wilmington, Ohio, U.S.
- Died: May 19, 1907 (aged 92) Savannah, Missouri, U.S
- Party: Republican (1855–1907)
- Other political affiliations: Democratic (before 1855)
- Relatives: Aaron Harlan (cousin)

Andrew Jackson Harlan (March 29, 1815 – May 19, 1907) was a U.S. representative from Indiana and later a member of the Missouri House of Representatives. He was a cousin of Aaron Harlan.

== Early life ==
Born near Wilmington, Ohio, Harlan attended the public schools. He studied law, was admitted to the bar in 1839 and commenced practice in Richmond, Indiana. He moved to Marion, Indiana, in 1839.

== Career ==
He served as a clerk of the Indiana House of Representatives in 1842 and a member 1846–1848.

=== U.S. House of Representatives ===
Harlan was elected as a Democrat to the Thirty-first Congress (March 4, 1849 – March 3, 1851).

Harlan was elected to the Thirty-third Congress (March 4, 1853 – March 3, 1855). He served as chairman of the Committee on Mileage (Thirty-third Congress). In a Democratic congressional convention at Marion, Indiana in 1854, he was publicly read out of the Democratic Party for voting against the repeal of the Missouri Compromise. He declined the nomination from the People's Party in 1854 for the Thirty-fourth Congress, and afterward allied himself with the Republican Party.

=== Post-congressional career ===
He moved to Dakota Territory in 1861, where he served as a member of the Territorial house of representatives in 1861 and served as speaker. He was driven from the Territory by the Indians in September 1862 and settled in Savannah, Missouri, where he resumed the practice of law. He served as a member of the Missouri House of Representatives 1864–1868, serving as a speaker for the last two years.

== Later life ==
He moved to Wakeeney, Kansas, in 1885 and practiced law. He was appointed by President Harrison as postmaster of Wakeeney and served from 1890 to 1894. He was removed to Savannah, Missouri, in 1894 and died there on May 19, 1907. He was interred in Savannah Cemetery.

U.S. House of Representatives
Preceded by William R. Rockhill	Member of the U.S. House of Representatives from Indiana's 10th congressional district 1849 – 1851	Succeeded by Samuel Brenton
New district	Member of the U.S. House of Representatives from Indiana's 11th congressional district 1853 – 1855	Succeeded by John U. Pettit

Political offices
Preceded by Walter L. Lovelace	Speaker of the Missouri House of Representatives; 1865–1869	Succeeded by John C. Orrick
