= Charles Case =

American politician

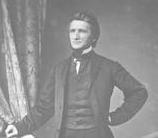

Member of the U.S. House of Representatives from Indiana's 10th district
- In office December 7, 1857 – March 3, 1861
- Preceded by: Samuel Brenton
- Succeeded by: William Mitchell

Personal details
- Born: December 21, 1817 Austinburg, Ohio, U.S.
- Died: June 30, 1883 (aged 65) Washington County, Iowa, U.S
- Party: Republican

Military service
- Branch/service: Union Army
- Rank: Major
- Battles/wars: American Civil War

Charles Case (December 21, 1817 – June 30, 1883) was an American lawyer who served two terms as a U.S. representative from Indiana from 1857 to 1861.

== Biography ==
Case was born in Austinburg, Ohio; studied law; was admitted to the bar and commenced practice in Fort Wayne, Indiana.

=== Congress ===
He was elected as a Republican to the Thirty-fifth United States Congress to fill the vacancy caused by the death of Samuel Brenton; reelected to the Thirty-sixth United States Congress and served from December 7, 1857, to March 3, 1861; unsuccessful candidate for reelection in 1860 to the Thirty-seventh United States Congress.

=== Later career and death ===
During the Civil War, he served as first lieutenant and adjutant of the Forty-fourth Regiment, Indiana Volunteer Infantry; subsequently became a major in the Third Regiment, Indiana Volunteer Cavalry, and served from November 26, 1861, - August 15, 1862.

He later resumed the practice of his profession in Washington, D.C.

He died in Brighton, Washington County, Iowa; interment in the Congressional Cemetery, Washington, D.C.

== Footnotes ==
U.S. House of Representatives
Preceded by Samuel Brenton	Member of the U.S. House of Representatives from Indiana's 10th congressional district 1857 – 1861	Succeeded by William Mitchell
