= William D. Owen =

American politician (1846 – unknown)

William Owen
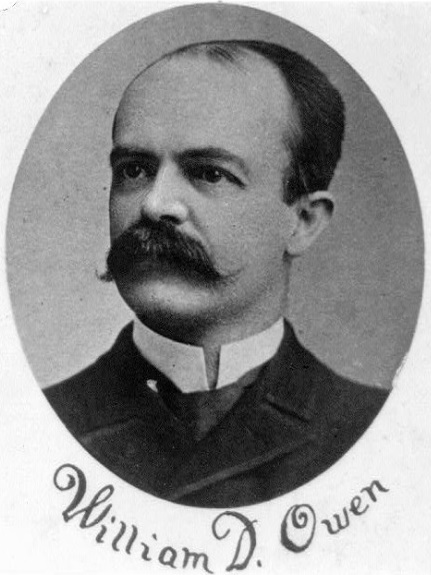

Secretary of State of Indiana
- In office January 17, 1895 – January 16, 1899
- Governor: Claude Matthews; James A. Mount
- Preceded by: William R. Myers
- Succeeded by: Union Hunt

Superintendent of Immigration
- In office July 1, 1891 – April 7, 1893
- President: Benjamin Harrison; Grover Cleveland
- Preceded by: Position established
- Succeeded by: Herman Stump

Member of the U.S. House of Representatives from Indiana's 10th district
- In office March 4, 1885 – March 3, 1891
- Preceded by: Thomas Jefferson Wood
- Succeeded by: David H. Patton

Personal details
- Born: September 6, 1846 Bloomington, Indiana, U.S.
- Died: May 2, 1918 (aged 71) Worthing, England, UK
- Party: Republican
- Spouse(s): Mary Ross (died 1885) Lucy Williams Luce (died 1899)
- Education: Indiana University, Bloomington (attended)

William Dale Owen (his middle name is given as "Dunn" in some references) (September 6, 1846 – May 19, 1918) was a U.S. representative from Indiana. Before serving in Congress he was a clergyman, attorney, newspaper editor, and the author of two books. After serving in Congress and as Secretary of State of Indiana, he engaged in various business ventures, including promotion of coffee and rubber plantations in Mexico. In 1905 his business partner was arrested; in 1906 the partner was convicted of fraud and theft, and imprisoned. Owen left the United States to avoid prosecution; what happened to him after he fled the country is not known.

== Early life ==
Owen was born in Bloomington, Indiana, the son of William D. Owen and Priscilla (Rawlings) Owen. He was educated in Bloomington, and began working as a store clerk at age 13 to save money so that he could attend college. He worked until age 18, including time as a farmhand and a brickyard laborer in addition to his work as a store clerk. He attended Indiana University in Bloomington for over two years, and left before graduating so that he could begin to study law in the office of a local attorney.

== Start of career ==
He quit the study of law when he was called to the ministry; he received his ordination in the Christian Church in 1870, and became pastor of congregations in Oxford, Indiana, Salem, Oregon, Tallula, Illinois, and Chicago, Illinois. In 1878 he resumed the study of law, attained admission to the bar, and began to practice, first in Oxford, and later in Logansport. In addition, Owen was a part-owner and editor of two weekly newspapers, the Logansport Saturday Night and the Logansport Sunday Critic.

In 1880, Owen was a Republican candidate for presidential elector; his party carried Indiana, and he cast his ballot for the ticket of James A. Garfield and Chester A. Arthur. Owen also published two well-received books, 1878's Success In Life, And How To Secure It, and 1883's The Genius Of Industry, Or How Work Wins and Manhood Grows.

== Congressman ==
Owen was elected as a Republican to the Forty-ninth, Fiftieth, and Fifty-first Congresses (March 4, 1885 – March 3, 1891). He was an unsuccessful candidate for reelection in 1890 to the Fifty-second Congress.

From July 1, 1891, to April 7, 1893, Owen served as the first superintendent of the United States Office of Immigration; he had been chairman of the House Committee on Immigration and Naturalization during his Congressional service, and played a lead role in passage of the legislation which created the agency.

== Indiana Secretary of State ==
Owen was elected Secretary of State of Indiana in 1894 and served from January 17, 1895, to January 16, 1899.

== Later career ==
After leaving office, Owen engaged in real estate speculation and invested in coffee and rubber plantations in Mexico.

=== Fraud indictment and flight from prosecution ===
In 1905, Owen and his business partner were indicted for fraud and theft in connection with the promotion of their Mexican plantations. The partner was convicted and sentenced to prison. Owen fled the United States to escape prosecution. Individuals from Indiana later reported having seen Owen in Paris, Switzerland, and Egypt, but the sightings did not lead to his arrest.

An individual was arrested in Georgia in 1909 and accused of being Owen. Investigators subsequently determined it to be a case of mistaken identity, and the individual who had been detained was released.

== Family ==
In 1871, Owen married Mary Ross of Cincinnati, Ohio. They had two children who died infancy; she died in December 1885.

In 1888, Owen married Lucy A. (Williams) Luce, a widow from Logan, Iowa. They had met in Washington; during the 1888 Republican National Convention, Owen became ill and Luce nursed him until he was well. The second Mrs. Owen died on a train in Arkansas on April 1, 1899, while returning with her husband from a visit to his Mexican plantations. She was buried in her hometown of Logan, Iowa.

U.S. House of Representatives
Preceded by Thomas Wood	Member of the U.S. House of Representatives from Indiana's 10th congressional district 1885–1891	Succeeded by David H. Patton
Political offices
New office	Superintendent of Immigration; 1891–1893	Succeeded by Herman Stump
Preceded by William R. Myers	Secretary of State of Indiana; 1895–1899	Succeeded by Union Hunt
