= John B. Peterson (Indiana politician) =

American politician

John Barney Peterson
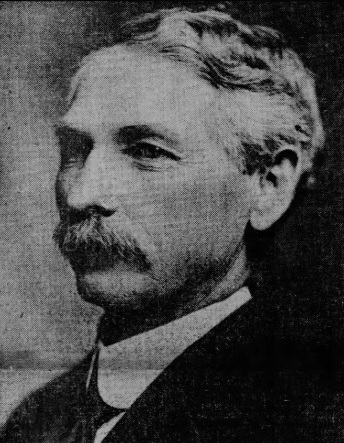
- The Lake County Times (Hammond, Indiana), June 8, 1910

Member of the U.S. House of Representatives from Indiana's 10th district
- In office March 4, 1913 – March 3, 1915
- Preceded by: Edgar D. Crumpacker
- Succeeded by: William R. Wood

Personal details
- Born: July 4, 1850 Lowell, Indiana, U.S.
- Died: July 16, 1944 (aged 94) Crown Point, Indiana, U.S.
- Party: Democratic

John Barney Peterson (July 4, 1850 – July 16, 1944) was a U.S. representative from Indiana, cousin of Horatio Clifford Claypool and Harold Kile Claypool.

Born near Lowell, Indiana, Peterson attended public schools. He was admitted to the bar in 1870 and commenced practice in Crown Point, Indiana. He served as prosecuting attorney of the thirty-first judicial circuit 1880–1884.

Peterson was elected as a Democrat to the Sixty-third Congress (March 4, 1913 – March 3, 1915). He was an unsuccessful candidate for reelection in 1914 to the Sixty-fourth Congress. He resumed the practice of law in Crown Point, Indiana. He also engaged in banking and served as president of the Commercial Bank, Crown Point, Indiana, and of the First Calumet Trust & Savings Bank of East Chicago, Indiana, until 1939, when he retired. He died in Crown Point, Indiana, July 16, 1944, and was interred in Maplewood Cemetery.

U.S. House of Representatives
Preceded by Edgar D. Crumpacker	Member of the U.S. House of Representatives from Indiana's 10th congressional district 1913 – 1915	Succeeded by William R. Wood
