= Thomas James Clark Fagg =

American judge (1822–1914)

Judge of the Supreme Court of Missouri
- In office October 1, 1866 – November 1868
- Appointed by: Thomas Clement Fletcher
- Preceded by: Walter L. Lovelace

Personal details
- Born: July 15, 1822 Albemarle County, Virginia
- Died: October 26, 1914 (aged 92) St. Louis, Missouri
- Spouse: Madora Block
- Children: E. B. Fagg and others
- Education: University of Virginia (preparatory studies)
- Alma mater: Illinois College
- Occupation: Lawyer, legislator, judge

Thomas James Clark Flagg (July 15, 1822 – October 26, 1914) was an American lawyer, legislator, and judge who served as a justice of the Supreme Court of Missouri from 1866 to 1868.

== Early life, education, and career ==
Born near Charlottesville, in Albemarle County, Virginia, Fagg was the youngest of four children of John and Elizabeth (Oglesby) Fagg. As a child, he personally met an elderly Thomas Jefferson. Fagg completed preparatory studies at the University of Virginia before moving with his parents to Pike County, Missouri in 1836. The following year he entered Illinois College at Jacksonville, Illinois, though his studies there were twice interrupted by family circumstances.

In 1843 Fagg began reading law in the office of Gilchrist Porter at Bowling Green, Missouri, and was admitted to the bar in May 1845. He practiced with James Broadhead until 1848, when he relocated to Clarksville to continue his legal work and administer estates.

== Political and judicial activities ==
In the summer of 1850, Fagg was unsuccessful as a candidate for the state legislature, but in the November of that year was elected probate judge of Pike County, to which he was re-elected in 1854. He resigned in 1855 to take a seat in the Missouri House of Representatives, later returning for another term in 1858. From 1856 he also served as judge of a court of common pleas. In 1860, Fagg was the Constitutional Union nominee for lieutenant governor of Missouri, but lost to Democratic nominee Thomas Caute Reynolds by a margin of 14,587 votes.

An outspoken Unionist, at the outbreak of the American Civil War, Fagg organized companies of home guards in 1861 and was appointed brigade inspector with the rank of colonel by Governor Hamilton Gamble. He commanded the Fifth Regiment of Missouri State Troops, known as "Fagg's Regiment".

In January 1862 acting Governor Willard P. Hall appointed him circuit judge for Missouri's Third Judicial Circuit, comprising several eastern counties. One of his circuit cases later gave rise to Cummings v. Missouri (1866), in which the United States Supreme Court struck down a state loyalty-oath requirement.

Following the death of Justice Walter L. Lovelace in 1866, Governor Thomas C. Fletcher appointed Fagg to the Supreme Court of Missouri on October 1, 1866. He served until November 1868, after which he returned to private practice. Contemporary commentary described him as a vigorous Radical Republican and a man of "native talent", though his judicial temperament drew mixed assessments from political opponents.

After leaving the bench, Fagg resumed practice in Louisiana, Missouri, partnering at times with Colonel D. P. Dyer and W. H. Biggs. He later moved to St. Louis, where he worked in the insurance business before returning to Louisiana in 1890 to form a law partnership with David A. Ball. He retired in 1898.

== Personal life and death ==
On November 11, 1847, Fagg married Madora Block of Ashley, Pike County; they had several children, including attorney E. B. Fagg, who became his law partner.

Fagg died in St. Louis on October 26, 1914, aged 92, and was buried in Louisiana, Missouri. At the time of his death he was recognized as one of Missouri's oldest surviving jurists.

Political offices
Preceded by Walter L. Lovelace	Justice of the Missouri Supreme Court; 1866–1868	Succeeded by Court substantially reconfigured
