= Benjamin Holmes (American politician) =

American mayor (1846–1914)

28th Mayor of Kansas City
- In office 1890–1892
- Preceded by: Joseph J. Davenport
- Succeeded by: William S. Cowherd

Personal details
- Born: August 8, 1846; St. Louis, Missouri, U.S.
- Died: January 14, 1914 (aged 67)
- Political party: Democratic

Benjamin Holmes (August 8, 1846 – January 14, 1914) was a Democratic Mayor of Kansas City, Missouri 1890–1891.

He was the first mayor under a new charter allowing for two-year terms and oversaw the design and construction of the George Kessler-designed parkway system.

Was born in Independence, Missouri; operated the livestock commission firm of Lail & Holmes at the Kansas City Livestock Exchange building; was treasurer of Jackson County, Missouri from 1878 to 1885.

Holmes was buried in Elmwood Cemetery.

Political offices
Preceded by Joseph J. Davenport	Mayor of Kansas City, Missouri; 1890–1892	Succeeded by William S. Cowherd
