= David Henry Patton =

American politician

David Patton
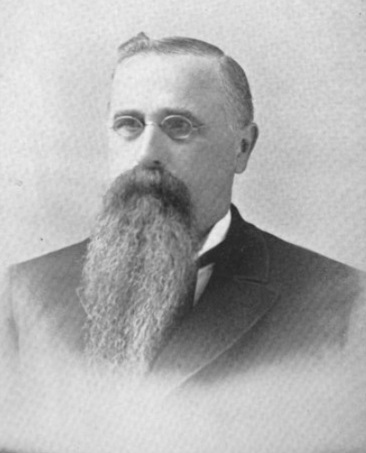

Member of the U.S. House of Representatives from Indiana's 10th district
- In office March 4, 1891 – March 3, 1893
- Preceded by: William D. Owen
- Succeeded by: Thomas Hammond

Personal details
- Born: David Henry Patton; November 26, 1837 Flemingsburg, Kentucky, U.S.
- Died: January 17, 1914 (aged 76) Otterbein, Indiana, U.S
- Resting place: Remington Cemetery, Remington, Indiana
- Party: Democratic
- Education: Chicago Medical School

Military service
- Branch/service: Union Army
- Years of service: 1861–1865
- Rank: Colonel
- Unit: 38th Indiana Regiment
- Battles/wars: American Civil War

David Henry Patton (November 26, 1837 – January 17, 1914) was an American physician, Civil War veteran who served one term as a U.S. representative from Indiana from 1891 to 1893.

== Biography ==
Born in Flemingsburg, Kentucky, Patton attended the Collegiate Institute, Waveland, Indiana. Enlisted in the Thirty-eighth Indiana Regiment in 1861 and was mustered out in July 1865, after having attained the rank of colonel. He graduated from the Chicago Medical College in 1867 and practiced medicine in Remington, Indiana. Pension examiner at Remington 1886–1890. He served as delegate to the Democratic National Convention in 1892 and 1900.

=== Congress ===
Patton was elected as a Democrat to the Fifty-second Congress (March 4, 1891 – March 3, 1893). He was not a candidate for renomination in 1892.

=== Later career ===
He moved to Woodward, Woodward County, Indian Territory (now Oklahoma), in 1893. He was appointed receiver of public lands for Oklahoma in 1893, and later resumed the practice of medicine. He served as member of the district board of health of Woodward, Oklahoma. He was appointed pension examiner at Woodward.

== Death and burial ==
He died in Otterbein, Indiana, on January 17, 1914. He was interred in Remington Cemetery, Remington, Indiana.

U.S. House of Representatives
Preceded by William D. Owen	Member of the U.S. House of Representatives from Indiana's 10th congressional district 1891 – 1893	Succeeded by Thomas Hammond
