= William Williams (Indiana politician) =

American politician (1821–1896)

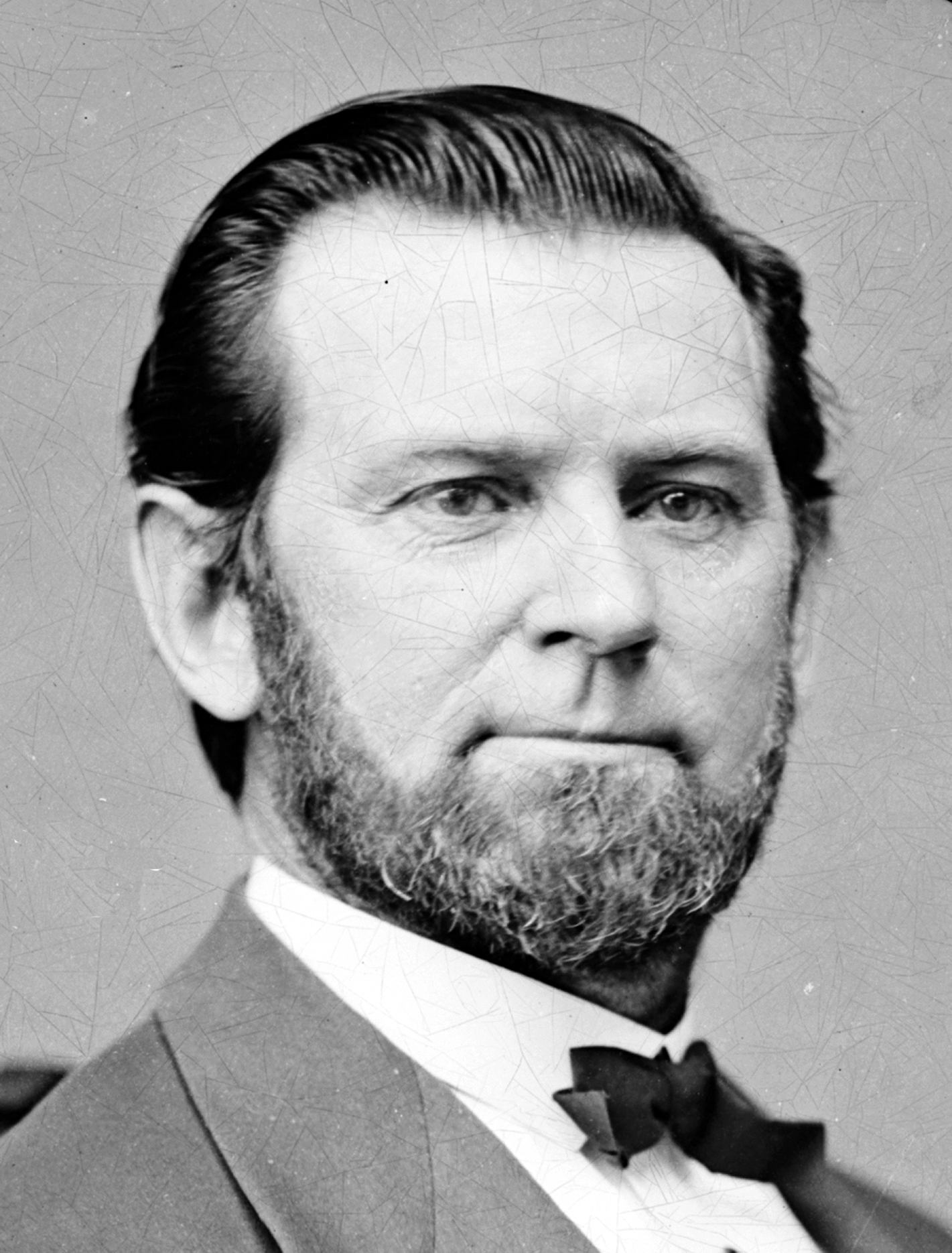

Member of the U.S. House of Representatives from Indiana
- In office March 4, 1867 – March 3, 1875
- Preceded by: Joseph H. Defrees (10th); District established (AL)
- Succeeded by: Henry B. Sayler (10th); District eliminated (AL)
- Constituency: 10th district (1867-73); At-large district (1873-75)

Personal details
- Born: May 11, 1821 Carlisle, Pennsylvania, U.S.
- Died: April 22, 1896 (aged 74) Warsaw, Indiana, U.S
- Party: Republican

Military service
- Branch/service: Union Army
- Battles/wars: American Civil War

William Williams (May 11, 1821 – April 22, 1896) was an American lawyer and politician who served four terms as a U.S. representative in Indiana from 1867 to 1875.

== Biography ==
Born near Carlisle, Pennsylvania, Williams attended the common schools and received a very limited education. He studied law and was admitted to the bar in 1845 and commenced practice in Warsaw, Indiana. Williams served as Treasurer of Kosciusko County in 1852. He resigned the office of treasurer for an ultimately unsuccessful bid for Lieutenant Governor in 1853.

Williams managed the Bank of Warsaw for several years, and also served as director of the Fort Wayne and Chicago Railway from 1854 to 1856, and as director of the Michigan City prison from 1859 to 1862. He served in the Union Army as commandant of Camp Allen in Fort Wayne, in 1862 and as paymaster of Volunteers, with headquarters at Louisville, Kentucky, until the close of the war.

=== Congress ===
Williams was elected as a Republican to the Fortieth and to the three succeeding Congresses (March 4, 1867 – March 3, 1875). He served as chairman of the Committee on Expenditures in the Department of War (Fortieth through Forty-third Congresses). He did not run in 1874, and returned to Warsaw to practice law.

In 1882, Williams was appointed by President Arthur as Chargé d'Affaires to Paraguay and Uruguay and served until July 21, 1885.

=== Later career and death ===
He returned to Warsaw, Indiana, in 1885 and retired from active business pursuits. He died there on April 22, 1896, and was interred in Oakwood Cemetery.

U.S. House of Representatives
Preceded by Joseph H. Defrees	Member of the U.S. House of Representatives from Indiana's 10th congressional district March 4, 1867 – March 4, 1873	Succeeded by Henry B. Sayler
District inactive	Member of the U.S. House of Representatives from Indiana's at-large district March 4, 1873 – March 3, 1875	District inactive
Diplomatic posts
Preceded by John C. Caldwell	United States Chargé d'Affaires, Uruguay; July 10, 1882 – July 21, 1885	Succeeded by John E. Bacon
Preceded by John C. Caldwell	United States Chargé d'Affaires, Paraguay; August 26, 1882–21 July 1885	Succeeded by John E. Bacon
