= Walter L. Lovelace =

American judge (1831–1866)

Walter L. Lovelace (October 1, 1831 – August 5, 1866) was a Missouri lawyer and politician who served as Speaker of the Missouri House of Representatives from 1864 to 1865, and as a justice of the Supreme Court of Missouri from 1865 to 1866.

== Early life, education, and career ==
Lovelace was born in Charlotte County, Virginia. His parents were not wealthy and his father died in 1833. His mother moved to Montgomery County, Missouri, and Walter labored on a farm during his boyhood, attending school only during the winter months.

He became a teacher and by his savings was able to attend the University of Missouri. He also "studied law under Ben Sharp, a prominent lawyer in the area", and was admitted to the bar in 1855.

== Political and judicial career ==
In 1862 and 1864 he was elected to the Missouri state legislature, serving as Speaker of the Missouri House of Representatives during his second term. An oil painting of him adorns the walls of the Chamber, "a memorial placed by Legislative direction".

On June 13, 1865, he was one of three justices appointed to the Supreme Court, which had been reconfigured by statute. He died fifteen months later, at his home in Danville, Missouri, having suffered lung issues and diagnosed with consumption. He was not yet 35 years old. Described as an "industrious judge", it was further written that "his opinions indicate that with experience and good health he would have earned for himself a prominent rank".

Political offices
Preceded by L. C. Marvin	Speaker of the Missouri House of Representatives; 1864–1865	Succeeded by Andrew J. Harlan
Preceded by Newly reconfigured court	Justice of the Missouri Supreme Court; 1865–1866	Succeeded by Thomas James Clark Fagg
