= William Rockhill Nelson =

American businessman (1841–1915)

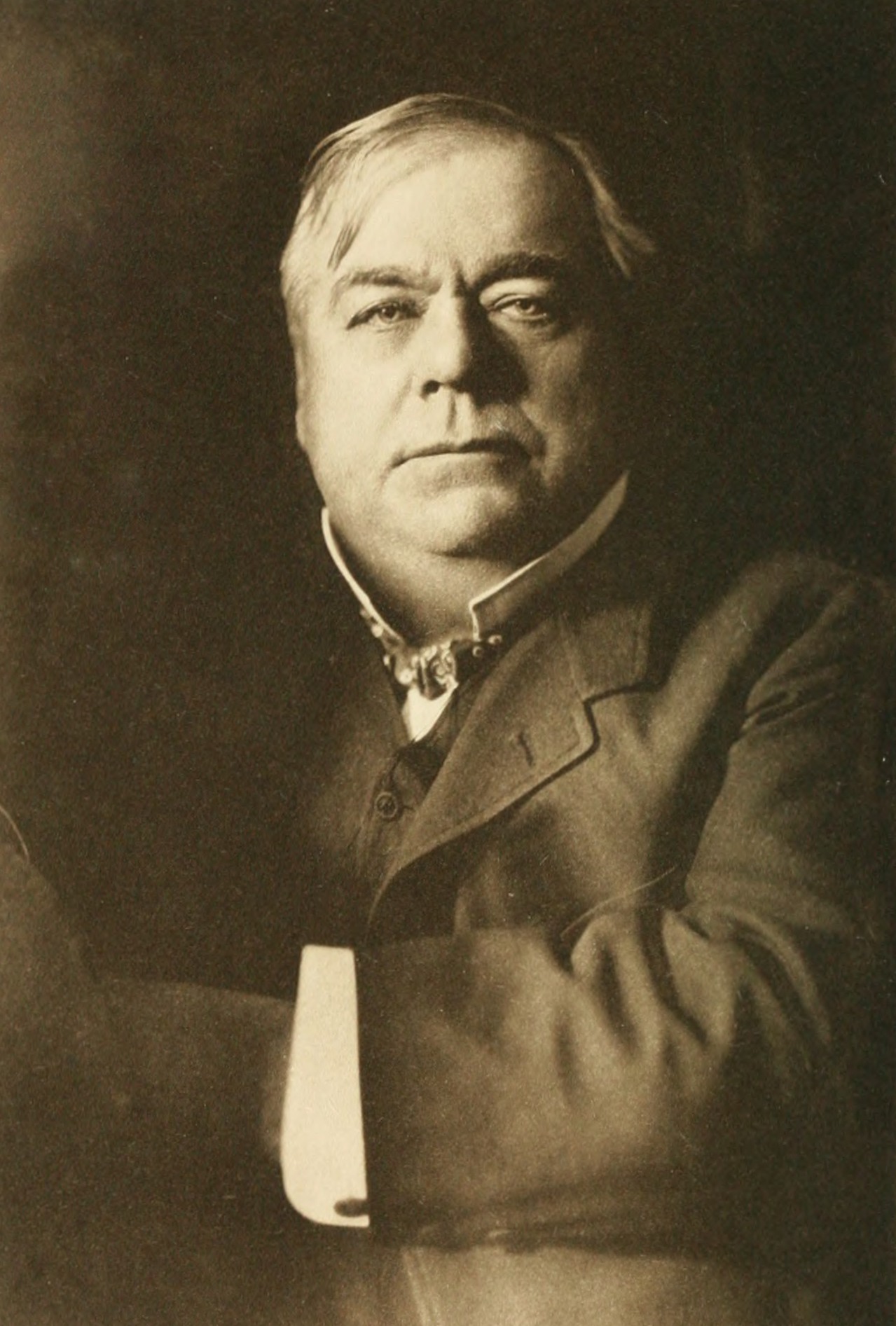
- Born: March 7, 1841; Fort Wayne, Indiana, U.S.
- Died: April 13, 1915 (aged 74); Kansas City, Missouri, U.S.
- Resting place: Mount Washington Cemetery; Independence, Missouri, U.S.
- Education: University of Notre Dame
- Occupations: Real estate developer; businessman
- Known for: Co-founder of The Kansas City Star
- Father: Isaac De Groff Nelson
- Relatives: William R. Rockhill (grandfather)

William Rockhill Nelson (March 7, 1841 – April 13, 1915) was an American real estate developer and businessman who co-founded The Kansas City Star in Kansas City, Missouri.

He donated his estate for the establishment of the Nelson-Atkins Museum of Art.

== Early life ==
Nelson was born on March 7, 1841, in Fort Wayne, Indiana, the second of five children. His father was publisher Isaac De Groff Nelson (1810–1891) and his mother was Elizabeth Rockhill (1816–1889), the daughter of William R. Rockhill, an important farmer and politician in Fort Wayne, Indiana. For a short time, Isaac Nelson owned The Sentinel newspaper (which became the Fort Wayne News Sentinel). But his father, as he was fondly known for many years in Fort Wayne, was much more renowned as a nursery owner. His own estate, "Elm Park", was considered "the showplace of Allen County".

In high school, Nelson attended the University of Notre Dame (which then accepted high school students) for a year, and Nelson said, "It was the Botany Bay of Indiana where all bad boys were sent". Botany Bay was a planned but rejected 18th-century Australian penal colony near aboriginal remains. Notre Dame's response to Nelson's chronically disruptive behavior was expulsion of the rebellious student and an entreaty that he not return there.

Nelson was admitted to the Indiana Bar in 1862 at age 18, and he was a campaign manager for New York Democratic presidential nominee Samuel J. Tilden. Tilden told him: "While it is a great thing to lead armies, it is a greater thing to lead the minds of men".

Nelson attempted to run a store in Savannah, Georgia but it failed. The southern sojourn was to earn him the nickname "The Colonel" even though Nelson never did military service. Newspaper editor William Allen White said later: "Not that he was ever a colonel of anything... He was just coloneliferous".

== Newspapers ==
Nelson formally took over the Sentinel with Samuel Morss in 1879. In 1880, they moved to Kansas City and started the Star. At the time there were three daily competitors – the Evening Mail; The Kansas City Times; and the Kansas City Journal. Nelson took over sole ownership of the paper within a few months.

Nelson's business strategy called for cheap advance subscriptions and an intention to be "absolutely independent in politics, aiming to deal by all men and all parties with impartiality and fearlessness".

He purchased the Kansas City Evening Mail and its Associated Press franchise in 1882 and started the Weekly Kansas City Star in 1890 and the Sunday Kansas City Star in 1894. Nelson bought the Times in 1901, putting The Morning Kansas City Star nameplate on it.

Nelson had portraits of Tilden, Grover Cleveland, and Theodore Roosevelt in his office. Roosevelt stayed with Nelson at Oak Hall.

In a notorious local incident, Kansas City Mayor Joseph J. Davenport was thrown down a stairwell at the Star building by editors (including William Allen White) when Davenport was believed to have physically threatened Nelson. Nelson said afterwards, "The Star never loses!"

== Land Development ==
=== Residential ===
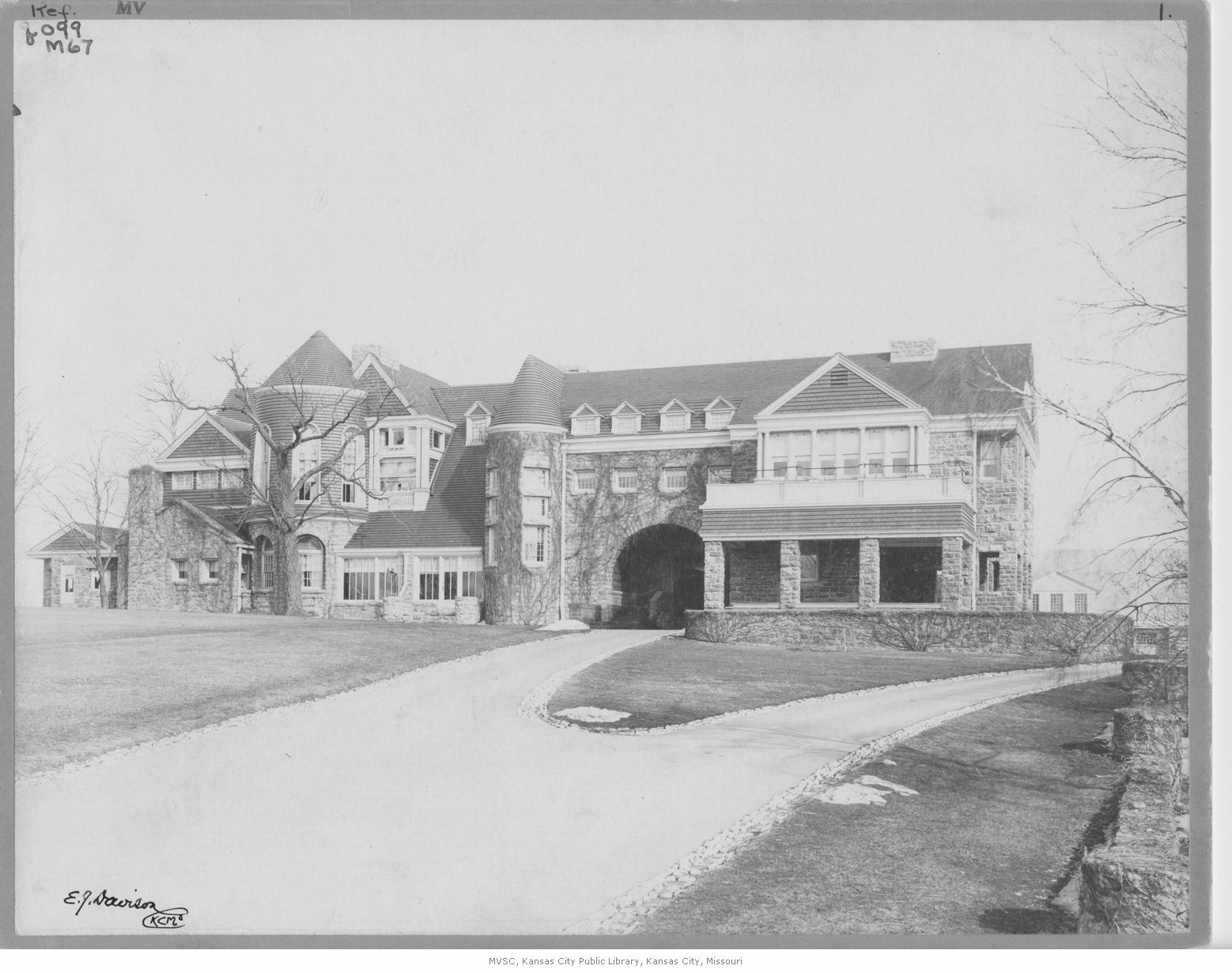
Oak Hall

In addition to his newspaper duties, Nelson developed an area of farmland south of downtown Kansas City into a neighborhood of more than 100 houses, including his own mansion called Oak Hall. The area, which became known as the Rockhill District, was noted for its use of limestone in both the houses and in stone walls that stood beside the streets.

During his lifetime Nelson supported the ideas of J. C. Nichols, a real estate developer and city planner. "Like Nichols, Nelson imposed racially restrictive covenants to ensure segregated housing; he also at no time granted leases on his one hundred houses because he desired the privilege to evict any tenant who incurred his disapproval."

=== Agricultural ===
Nelson also acquired more than 2,400 acres (9.7 km^{2}) in what is presently Grain Valley, Missouri, for the establishment of Sni-A-Bar Farms. The farm's mission was the development of improved breeding methods and livestock. It served as one of the world's leaders in animal health for more than 30 years.

Nelson's will established a trust for Sni-A-Bar Farms, which were "demonstration farms, research centers, and pillars of international agricultural innovation" that Nelson established about 1913 near Grain Valley, with Presidents from the University of Missouri, the University of Kansas, and the University of Oklahoma charged with selecting its trustees.

=== Public ===
He campaigned for Kansas City's George Kessler-designed park and boulevard system and the 1900 "Kansas City Spirit" to build Convention Hall in 90 days in order to host the 1900 Democratic National Convention after the original (and new) convention hall had burned in April 1900.

== Death and legacy ==
Nelson died on April 13, 1915, aged 74, in Oak Hall, his residence in Kansas City, Missouri, and is buried at Mount Washington Cemetery in Independence, Missouri.

He provided in his will that, following the death of his wife and daughter, his Oak Hill mansion be torn down and its 30-acre (120,000 m^{2}) estate turned into an art museum.

Proceeds from his $6 million estate ("relative value" today worth $431 million) were used to build the Nelson-Atkins Museum of Art in Kansas City. The Art Gallery originally contained a recreation of Nelson's oak paneled room from Oak Hall (and namesake of the estate). The room contained Nelson's red plush easy chair and bookcases. The room was dismantled in 1988 to make way for a photography studio.
