= Indiana's 10th congressional district =

Former U.S. House district from 1843 to 2003

Coordinates: 39°45′N 86°9′W

- Obsolete district
- Created: 1840
- Eliminated: 2000
- Years active: 1843–2003

Indiana's 10th congressional district was a congressional district for the United States House of Representatives in Indiana. It encompassed roughly the "Old City Limits" of Indianapolis from 1983 to 2003. The district was re-drawn after the 1980 census and eliminated when Indiana's representation in the House of Representatives fell from ten to nine after the 2000 census.

Congresswoman Julia Carson, who formerly represented the 10th, was elected in 2002 to represent Indiana's 7th congressional district. This district was redrawn to include the old 10th plus some new territory outside the old boundaries. The old 7th district was absorbed as part of Indiana's 4th congressional district and Indiana's 8th congressional district in 2003.

From 1983 to 2003, the 10th had just two representatives, Congressman Andrew Jacobs Jr. and Congresswoman Julia Carson. Carson was the second African-American to represent any part of Indiana in Congress. Katie Hall was the first, having represented Indiana's 1st congressional district, from 1982 to 1985.

== List of members representing the district ==
Member	Party	Years	Cong ress	Electoral history
District created March 4, 1843
Andrew Kennedy (Muncietown)	Democratic	March 4, 1843 – March 3, 1847	28th 29th	Redistricted from the 5th district and Re-elected in 1843. Re-elected in 1845. Retired.
William R. Rockhill (Fort Wayne)	Democratic	March 4, 1847 – March 3, 1849	30th	Elected in 1847. Retired.
Andrew J. Harlan (Marion)	Democratic	March 4, 1849 – March 3, 1851	31st	Elected in 1849. Retired.
Samuel Brenton (Fort Wayne)	Whig	March 4, 1851 – March 3, 1853	32nd	Elected in 1851. Lost re-election.
Ebenezer M. Chamberlain (Goshen)	Democratic	March 4, 1853 – March 3, 1855	33rd	Elected in 1852. Lost re-election.
Samuel Brenton (Fort Wayne)	People's	March 4, 1855 – March 3, 1857	34th 35th	Elected in 1854. Re-elected in 1856. Died.
Samuel Brenton (Fort Wayne)	Republican	March 4, 1857 – March 29, 1857	34th 35th	Elected in 1854. Re-elected in 1856. Died.
Vacant		March 29, 1857 – December 7, 1857	35th	
Charles Case (Fort Wayne)	Republican	December 7, 1857 – March 3, 1861	35th 36th	Elected to finish Brenton's term. Re-elected in 1858. Retired.
William Mitchell (Kendallville)	Republican	March 4, 1861 – March 3, 1863	37th	Elected in 1860. Lost re-election.
Joseph K. Edgerton (Fort Wayne)	Democratic	March 4, 1863 – March 3, 1865	38th	Elected in 1862. Lost re-election.
Joseph H. Defrees (Goshen)	Republican	March 4, 1865 – March 3, 1867	39th	Elected in 1864. Retired.
William Williams (Warsaw)	Republican	March 4, 1867 – March 3, 1873	40th 41st 42nd	Elected in 1866. Re-elected in 1868. Re-elected in 1870. Redistricted to the at-large district.
Henry B. Sayler (Huntington)	Republican	March 4, 1873 – March 3, 1875	43rd	Elected in 1872. Retired.
William S. Haymond (Monticello)	Democratic	March 4, 1875 – March 3, 1877	44th	Elected in 1874. Lost re-election.
William H. Calkins (Laporte)	Republican	March 4, 1877 – March 3, 1881	45th 46th	Elected in 1876. Re-elected in 1878. Redistricted to the 13th district.
Mark L. De Motte (Valparaiso)	Republican	March 4, 1881 – March 3, 1883	47th	Elected in 1880. Lost re-election.
Thomas J. Wood (Crown Point)	Democratic	March 4, 1883 – March 3, 1885	48th	Elected in 1882. Lost re-election.
William D. Owen (Logansport)	Republican	March 4, 1885 – March 3, 1891	49th 50th 51st	Elected in 1884. Re-elected in 1886. Re-elected in 1888. Lost re-election.
David H. Patton (Remington)	Democratic	March 4, 1891 – March 3, 1893	52nd	Elected in 1890. Retired.
Thomas Hammond (Hammond)	Democratic	March 4, 1893 – March 3, 1895	53rd	Elected in 1892. Retired.
Jethro A. Hatch (Kentland)	Republican	March 4, 1895 – March 3, 1897	54th	Elected in 1894. Retired.
Edgar D. Crumpacker (Valparaiso)	Republican	March 4, 1897 – March 3, 1913	55th 56th 57th 58th 59th 60th 61st 62nd	Elected in 1896. Re-elected in 1898. Re-elected in 1900. Re-elected in 1902. Re-elected in 1904. Re-elected in 1906. Re-elected in 1908. Re-elected in 1910. Lost re-election.
John B. Peterson (Crown Point)	Democratic	March 4, 1913 – March 3, 1915	63rd	Elected in 1912. Lost re-election.
William R. Wood (Lafayette)	Republican	March 4, 1915 – March 3, 1933	64th 65th 66th 67th 68th 69th 70th 71st 72nd	Elected in 1914. Re-elected in 1916. Re-elected in 1918. Re-elected in 1920. Re-elected in 1922. Re-elected in 1924. Re-elected in 1926. Re-elected in 1928. Re-elected in 1930. Redistricted to the 2nd district and lost re-election.
Finly H. Gray (Connersville)	Democratic	March 4, 1933 – January 3, 1939	73rd 74th 75th	Elected in 1932. Re-elected in 1934. Re-elected in 1936. Lost re-election.
Raymond S. Springer (Connersville)	Republican	January 3, 1939 – August 28, 1947	76th 77th 78th 79th 80th	Elected in 1938. Re-elected in 1940. Re-elected in 1942. Re-elected in 1944. Re-elected in 1946. Died.
Vacant		August 28, 1947 – November 4, 1947	80th	
Ralph Harvey (New Castle)	Republican	November 4, 1947 – January 3, 1959	80th 81st 82nd 83rd 84th 85th	Elected to finish Springer's term. Re-elected in 1948. Re-elected in 1950. Re-elected in 1952. Re-elected in 1954. Re-elected in 1956. Lost re-election.
Randall S. Harmon (Muncie)	Democratic	January 3, 1959 – January 3, 1961	86th	Elected in 1958. Lost re-election.
Ralph Harvey (New Castle)	Republican	January 3, 1961 – December 30, 1966	87th 88th 89th	Elected in 1960. Re-elected in 1962. Re-elected in 1964. Lost renomination and resigned early.
Vacant		December 30, 1966 – January 3, 1967	89th	
Richard L. Roudebush (Noblesville)	Republican	January 3, 1967 – January 3, 1969	90th	Redistricted from the 6th district and re-elected in 1966. Redistricted to the 5th district.
David W. Dennis (Richmond)	Republican	January 3, 1969 – January 3, 1975	91st 92nd 93rd	Elected in 1968. Re-elected in 1970. Re-elected in 1972. Lost re-election.
Philip Sharp (Muncie)	Democratic	January 3, 1975 – January 3, 1983	94th 95th 96th 97th	Elected in 1974. Re-elected in 1976. Re-elected in 1978. Re-elected in 1980. Redistricted to the 2nd district.
Andrew Jacobs Jr. (Indianapolis)	Democratic	January 3, 1983 – January 3, 1997	98th 99th 100th 101st 102nd 103rd 104th	Redistricted from the 11th district and re-elected in 1982. Re-elected in 1984. Re-elected in 1986. Re-elected in 1988. Re-elected in 1990. Re-elected in 1992. Re-elected in 1994. Retired.
Julia Carson (Indianapolis)	Democratic	January 3, 1997 – January 3, 2003	105th 106th 107th	Elected in 1996. Re-elected in 1998. Re-elected in 2000. Redistricted to the 7th district.
District eliminated January 3, 2003
