= The Journal Gazette =

Indiana newspaper

- Type: Daily newspaper
- Format: Broadsheet
- Owner: The Journal Gazette Co.
- Publisher: Sherry Skufca
- Editor: Jim Touvell
- Founded: 1863 (as The Fort Wayne Gazette)
- Headquarters: 600 W. Main St. Fort Wayne, Indiana 46802; United States
- Circulation: 17,125 Daily; 18,639 Saturday
- ISSN: 0734-3701
- Website: journalgazette.net

The Journal Gazette is the morning newspaper in Fort Wayne, Indiana. It publishes six days a week, and contends for circulation and advertising in a 15-county area.

== History ==
The Journal Gazette traces its origins to 1863 when The Fort Wayne Gazette was founded. It was originally founded to support Lincoln and oppose slavery. In 1899, The Fort Wayne Gazette merged with The Journal to create The Journal Gazette. The Journal Gazette has always been a privately owned newspaper.

In 1950, in conjunction with the local owner of The News-Sentinel, The Journal Gazette entered into one of the first joint operating agreements for competing daily newspapers in the United States. That required a special act of Congress. (In 1970, Congress passed the Newspaper Preservation Act, codifying JOAs and exempting them from certain antitrust provisions.) Under the arrangement, The Journal Gazette and The News-Sentinel have independent editorial staffs and management, while a jointly owned corporation, Fort Wayne Newspapers, sells advertising, handles circulation, prints the newspapers and, since 1958, has been landlord to the newspapers' staffs.

In 1980 Knight Ridder bought The News-Sentinel and the majority interest in Fort Wayne Newspapers (with new joint operating agreement provisions) and agreed to extend the JOA through 2020.

In 2003 the JOA was again renegotiated with additional protections for the minority owners and an agreement to build a new downtown press facility.

In 2003, Knight Ridder sold all of its papers to the McClatchy Company, which in turn sold the NS to Ogden Newspapers of Wheeling, West Virginia. The JG had its third JOA partner, but remained locally owned and controlled.

In October 2017, The News-Sentinel's owners decided to cease publication of their print product, but The Journal Gazette agreed to publish a page of News-Sentinel content Monday through Saturday.

The Journal Gazette Building, longtime printing location, is listed on the National Register of Historic Places.

On January 20, 2023, the newspaper announced it would combine the content of its larger Sunday newspaper to Saturdays, effective Jan. 28.

Fort Wayne Newspapers also publishes a monthly city magazine, Fort Wayne Magazine. The publication highlights life in Northeast Indiana, including lifestyle, shopping and dining guides, features notable citizens and examines important social issues concerning the city and region.
