= The News-Sentinel =

Newspaper in Fort Wayne, Indiana

- The 2007-04-03 front page of The News-Sentinel
- Type: Daily newspaper
- Format: Broadsheet
- Owner: Ogden Newspapers
- Publisher: Scott Stanford
- Founded: 1833; 193 years ago (as The Sentinel)
- Headquarters: 600 West Main Street; Fort Wayne, Indiana
- Website: web.archive.org/*/https://news-sentinel.com

The News-Sentinel was a daily newspaper based in Fort Wayne, Indiana. The afternoon News-Sentinel was politically independent. The papers suspended publication in November 2020, after the beginning of COVID-19 pandemic.

== Early history ==
The News-Sentinel traces its origins to 1833, when The Sentinel was established as a weekly paper. The Sentinel was owned for a year and half in 1878–79 by Fort Wayne native William Rockhill Nelson who went on to found and make his fortune with The Kansas City Star. In 1918, The Sentinel merged with another local paper, The Fort Wayne Daily News, to form The News-Sentinel.

== The Foellinger years ==
In 1932, Helene Foellinger joined her father's newspaper, The Fort Wayne News-Sentinel, as a reporter, feature writer and – after convincing her father of the need – the newspaper's first women's editor. She was a new college graduate, but she studied mathematics, not journalism. In 1935, her father named her to the board of directors, expecting her to advance into his shoes when he retired – but in October 1936, he died unexpectedly. She became the youngest publisher of a major daily newspaper in the United States, as well as one of the few females in that position. She was up to the challenge, though, increasing circulation about 20% – from 56,700 to 67,800 – in just five years.

Ernest "Ernie" Williams, a reporter early in Helene Foellinger's reign, became editor, and a number of talented reporters from The News-Sentinel went on to positions on newspapers in larger cities and in broadcast journalism.

In 1950, Foellinger formed a joint operating agreement with the rival morning newspaper, The Journal Gazette. Each newspaper is separately managed and has separate editorial staffs, but Fort Wayne Newspapers provides advertising sales, circulation, and printing services used by both newspapers, and in 1958, built a new printing plant with offices for both newspapers. On the strength of The News-Sentinel, they ended up with a 55% share of Fort Wayne Newspapers, and Foellinger served as president.

== Knight-Ridder years ==
Helene Foellinger was 70, and there was no family member poised to take over The News-Sentinel, in 1980, when she sold News Publishing, along with the 55% share of Fort Wayne Newspapers, to Knight-Ridder in 1980.

In the 1980s, The News-Sentinel was still the dominant newspaper in Fort Wayne, with daily circulation in excess of 60,000, compared to about 10,000 less for The Journal Gazette. Moreover, their circulation was (and is) largely concentrated in Fort Wayne, making it especially attractive to city merchants. Circulation for large daily newspapers, particularly evening newspapers, has dropped in recent years.

In 2003, a 30-year extension to the joint operating agreement was inked. At that point, Knight Ridder boosted its ownership from 55% to 75%, at a cost of $42 million. Fort Wayne Newspapers spent $34.8 million to upgrade their printing presses, just west of the current plant at 600 W. Main Street.

In 1997, Knight Ridder bought The Kansas City Star, completing a circle of sorts. Knight Ridder was bought by The McClatchy Company in June 2006.

== Purchase by Ogden Newspapers ==
On March 14, 2006, McClatchy announced that it would sell 12 of the Knight Ridder newspapers, including The News-Sentinel, that are in markets not growing rapidly. Current and former News-Sentinel staffers disagreed on the significance.

Mary Jacobus, publisher of The News-Sentinel, joined The Boston Globe in January 2006 as president and general manager. During her four-year tenure, newsroom employment dropped 29%. Like The News-Sentinel, The Boston Globe was experiencing tough times, with 8% losses in daily and Sunday circulation in the prior year.

McClatchy reached an agreement to sell The News-Sentinel to Ogden Newspapers of West Virginia. Michael J. Christman, who was publishing two newspapers in Parkersburg, West Virginia was named the new publisher. The closing took place on June 27, 2006, simultaneously with the completion of McClatchy's acquisition of Knight Ridder. Ogden Newspapers is privately owned by members of the Nutting family. In the week prior to the sale, internet classified advertising giant Craigslist entered the Fort Wayne market.

On August 24, 2017, it was announced that The News-Sentinel will cease daily production of a physical print edition, with a focus on digital content. The morning delivery Fort Wayne paper, The Journal Gazette, will carry some articles using The News-Sentinel content in its daily printed morning delivery. The two papers have a contract with each other that dates back to 1950, and runs through 2075.

On August 10, 2018, seven of the remaining eight employees were laid off. Attributing the staff reduction to a "business decision", publisher Michael Christman said, “We'll still have a website. We'll still have a page in The Journal Gazette every Monday through Saturday. And we'll still have a presence at key events in the area.”

Scott Stanford was named by Ogden Newspapers as the new publisher February 27, 2019.

=== Suspension of publications ===
Following the beginning of COVID-19 pandemic, Fort Wayne Newspapers suspended publication of The News-Sentinel on 23 April 2020 and the last member of the paper's staff, Kevin Leininger, was furloughed.

== Awards ==
In 1983, The News-Sentinel was awarded a Pulitzer Prize for "its courageous and resourceful coverage of a devastating flood in March 1982". It was also honoured in 1992 as the Blue Ribbon Newspaper of the Year by the Hoosier State Press Association.
