= 14th Iowa Infantry Regiment =

- Iowa state flag
- Active: November 6, 1861, to August 8, 1865
- Country: United States
- Allegiance: Union
- Branch: Infantry
- Engagements: Fort Henry; Fort Donelson; Battle of Shiloh; Battle of Corinth; Battle of Pleasant Hill; Battle of Pilot Knob

The 14th Iowa Infantry Regiment was an infantry regiment that served in the Union Army during the American Civil War.

== Service ==
The 14th Iowa Infantry was organized at Davenport, Iowa, and mustered in for three years of Federal service on November 6, 1861.

The regiment was mustered out on August 8, 1865.

== Total strength and casualties ==
The 14th Iowa mustered a total of 1,720 during its existence.

It suffered 5 officers and 59 enlisted men who were killed in action or who died of their wounds and 1 officer and 138 enlisted men who died of disease, for a total of 203 fatalities.

== Commanders ==
- Colonel William T. Shaw

== See also ==
- List of Iowa Civil War Units
- Iowa in the American Civil War
