= List of people from Fort Wayne, Indiana =

The following is a list of notable natives, residents, or former residents of Fort Wayne, Indiana.

== Artists, designers, and architects ==
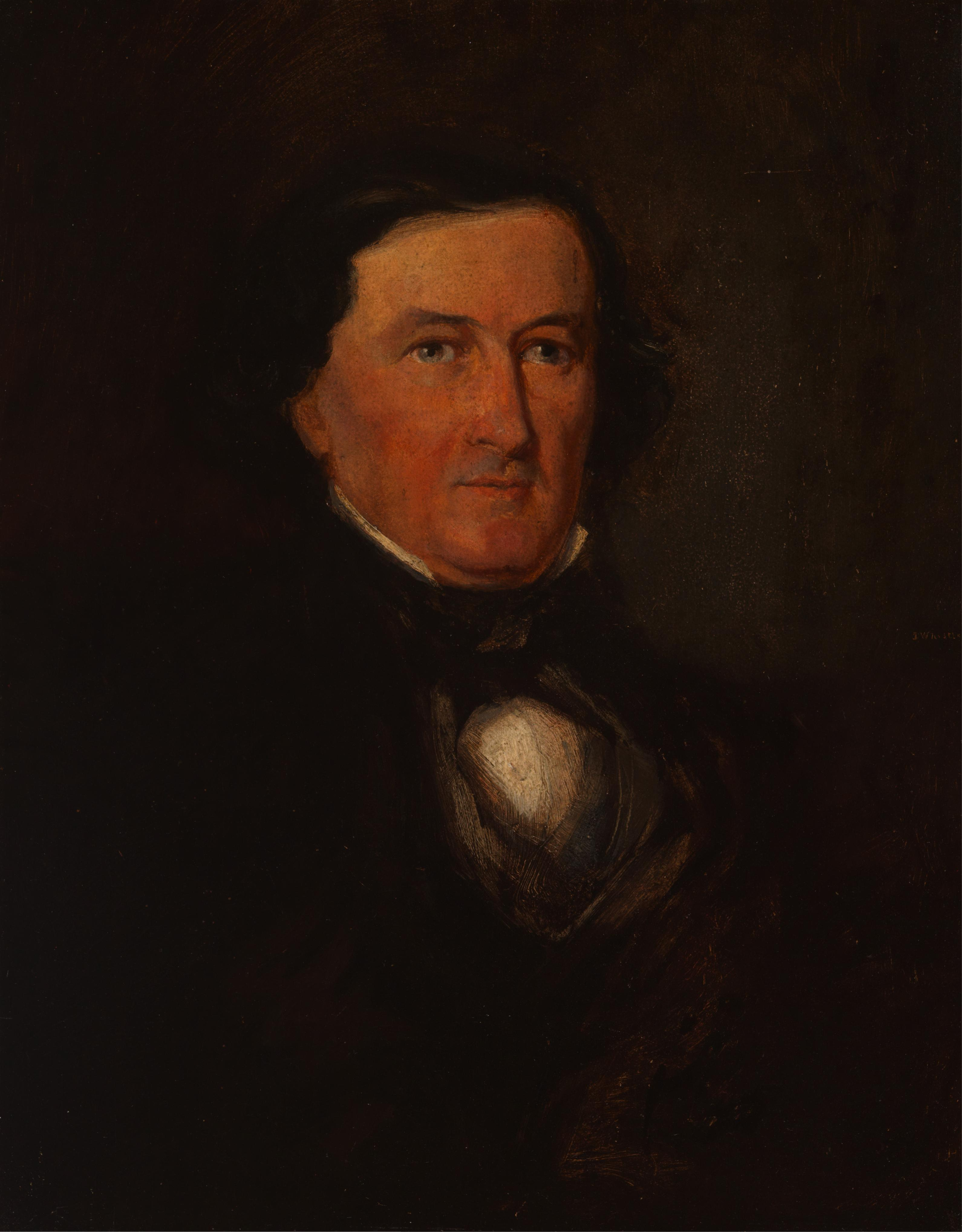
George Washington Whistler

- Bill Blass, fashion designer
- Bob Englehart, editorial cartoonist
- Richard "Grass" Green, cartoonist
- John Hambrock, cartoonist
- Eric Kuhne, architect
- Dick Moores, cartoonist
- Gray Morrow, comic book illustrator, art director for Spider-Man
- Bruce Nauman, artist
- Richard Nunez, artist
- Frederick William Sievers, sculptor
- Alvin M. Strauss, architect
- Egerton Swartwout, architect
- Brentwood S. Tolan, architect
- Thomas J. Tolan, architect
- George Washington Whistler, railroad engineer

== Athletes ==
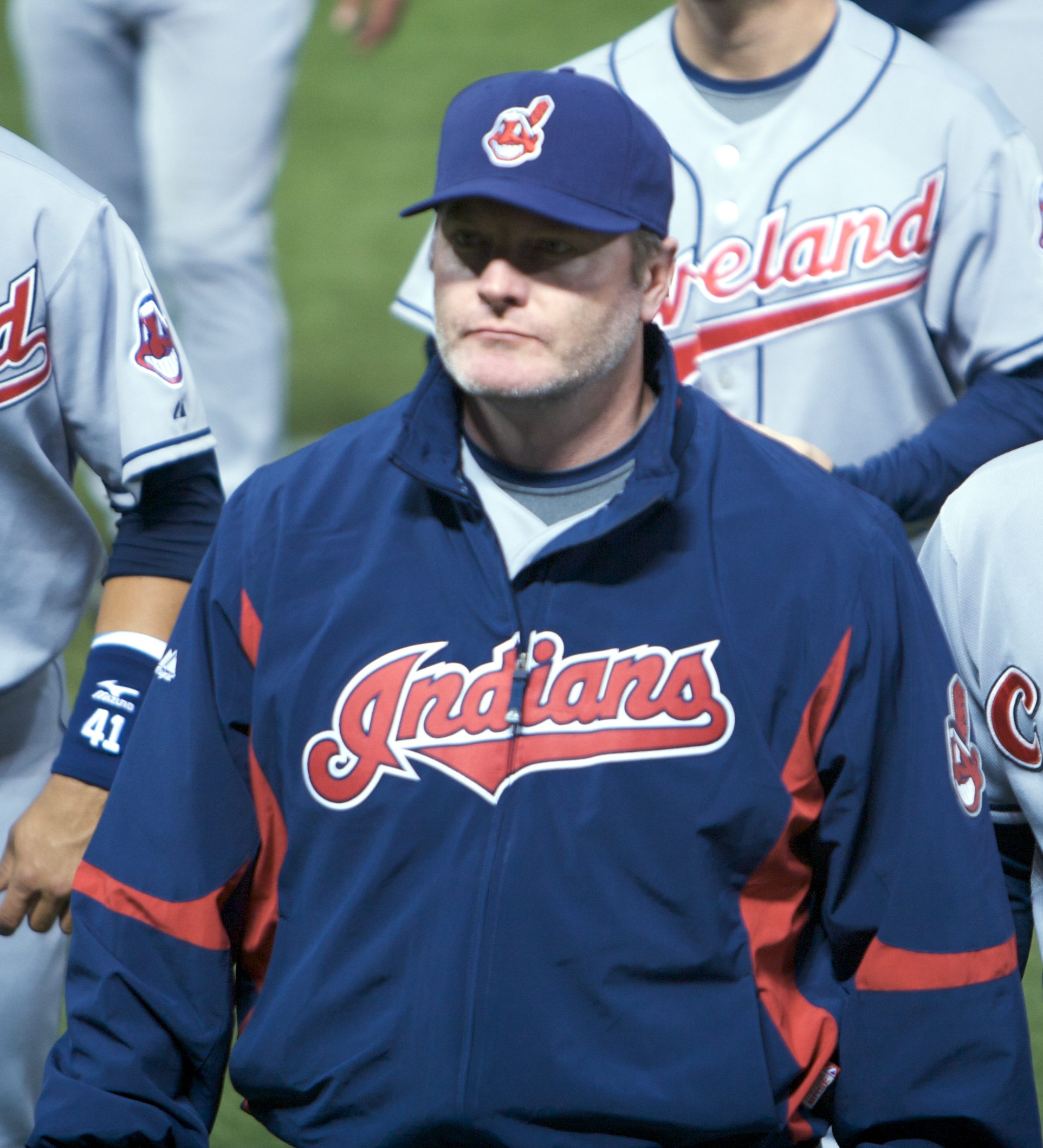
Manager of the Cleveland Indians 2003–2009, Fort Wayne native Eric Wedge

=== Baseball ===
- Isabel Álvarez, All-American Girls Professional Baseball League player
- Lenna Arnold, All-American Girls Professional Baseball League player (1946 Fort Wayne Daisies)
- Phyllis Bookout, All-American Girls Professional Baseball League player (1953 Fort Wayne Daisies)
- Rob Bowen, MLB (2003–2008) Minnesota Twins, San Diego Padres, Chicago Cubs, Oakland Athletics
- Dottie Wiltse Collins, All-American Girls Professional Baseball League (1944–1950), Minneapolis Millerettes, Fort Wayne Daisies)
- David Doster, MLB (1996, 1999) Philadelphia Phillies
- Bill Everitt, MLB (1895–1901) Chicago Colts/Orphans, Washington Senators
- Brent Gaff, MLB pitcher (1982–1984) New York Mets
- Harold Greiner (1907–1993), All-American Girls Professional Baseball League manager (Fort Wayne Daisies) and restaurant entrepreneur
- Steve Hargan, MLB pitcher (1965–1972, 1974–1977) Cleveland Indians, Texas Rangers, Toronto Blue Jays, Atlanta Braves
- Louie Heilbroner, manager, MLB (1900) St. Louis Cardinals
- Butch Henline, MLB (1921–1931) New York Giants, Philadelphia Phillies, Brooklyn Robins, Chicago White Sox
- Kevin Kiermaier, MLB player (2013–present) Tampa Bay Rays, Toronto Blue Jays
- Zach McKinstry, MLB player (2020-present)
- Naomi Meier, All-American Girls Professional Baseball League player
- Bruce Miller, MLB (1973–1976) San Francisco Giants
- Ralph Miller, MLB (1920–1924) Philadelphia Phillies, Washington Senators
- Rabbit Nill, MLB (1904–1908) Washington Senators, Cleveland Naps
- Jarrod Parker, MLB pitcher (2011–2013) Arizona Diamondbacks, Oakland Athletics
- Brian Reith, MLB pitcher (2001, 2003–2004) Cincinnati Reds
- Mike Roesler, MLB pitcher (1989–1990) Cincinnati Reds, Pittsburgh Pirates
- Andrew Saalfrank, MLB pitcher (2023–present) Arizona Diamondbacks
- Josh VanMeter, MLB utility (2019–present) Cincinnati Reds, Arizona Diamondbacks, Pittsburgh Pirates
- Ben Van Ryn, MLB pitcher (1996, 1998) California Angels, Chicago Cubs, San Diego Padres, Toronto Blue Jays
- Eric Wedge, player, MLB (1991–1994) Boston Red Sox, Colorado Rockies; manager, MLB (2003–2009) Cleveland Indians (2011–2013), Seattle Mariners
- Andy Woehr, MLB (1923–1924) Philadelphia Phillies

=== Basketball ===
- Curly Armstrong, NBA (1948–1951) Fort Wayne Pistons
- Dan Godfread, NBA (1990/91–1991/92) Minnesota Timberwolves, Houston Rockets
- Henry James, NBA (1990/91–1997/98) Cleveland Cavaliers, Utah Jazz, Sacramento Kings, Los Angeles Clippers, Houston Rockets, Atlanta Hawks
- Willie Long, NBA (1973–1974) Denver Rockets
- Kyle Macy, NBA (1980/81–1986/87) Phoenix Suns, Chicago Bulls, Indiana Pacers; sportscaster
- Mason Plumlee, NBA (2013–present) Brooklyn Nets, Portland Trail Blazers, Denver Nuggets, Detroit Pistons, Charlotte Hornets, Los Angeles Clippers
- Miles Plumlee, NBA (2012–2020) Indiana Pacers, Phoenix Suns, Milwaukee Bucks, Charlotte Hornets, Atlanta Hawks
- Bill Roberts, NBA (1948/49–1949/50) Chicago Stags, Boston Celtics, St. Louis Bombers
- Herm Schaefer, NBA (1948–1950) Minneapolis Lakers
- Ed Stanczak, NBA (1949/50–1950/51) Anderson Packers, Boston Celtics
- Caleb Swanigan, NBA (2017–2020) Portland Trail Blazers, Sacramento Kings
- Malik Williams, NBA (2024–present) Toronto Raptors
- Deshaun Thomas, player for Ohio State

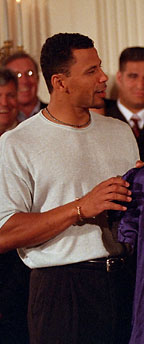
Pro Football Hall of Famer and Fort Wayne native Rod Woodson

=== Football ===
- Scott Auer, NFL (1984–1985) Kansas City Chiefs
- Mike Augustyniak, NFL (1981–1983) New York Jets
- Jason Baker, NFL (2001–2012) San Francisco 49ers, Philadelphia Eagles, Kansas City Chiefs, Indianapolis Colts, Denver Broncos, Carolina Panthers
- Jessie Bates III, NFL (2018–present) Cincinnati Bengals, Atlanta Falcons
- Bill Boedeker, NFL (1946–1950) Chicago Rockets, Cleveland Browns, Philadelphia Eagles, Green Bay Packers
- Jeremy Bridges, NFL (2004–2011) Arizona Cardinals, Carolina Panthers
- Johnny Bright, CFL (1952–1964), Calgary Stampeders, Edmonton Eskimos, subject of the "Johnny Bright Incident"
- Bob Cowan, NFL (1947–1949), Cleveland Browns, Baltimore Colts
- John Diettrich, NFL (1987) Houston Oilers
- Vaughn Dunbar, NFL (1992–1995) New Orleans Saints, Jacksonville Jaguars
- Tyler Eifert, NFL (2013–2020) Cincinnati Bengals, Jacksonville Jaguars
- Eric England, NFL (1994–1996) Arizona Cardinals
- Ricky Ervins, NFL (1991–1995) Washington Redskins, San Francisco 49ers
- Trai Essex, NFL (2005–2012) Pittsburgh Steelers, Super Bowl XL and Super Bowl XLIII champion
- Jason Fabini, NFL (1998–2008) New York Jets, Dallas Cowboys, Washington Redskins
- Steve Hall, NFL (1996) Minnesota Vikings, Indianapolis Colts
- James Hardy, NFL (2008–2011) Buffalo Bills
- Jim Juriga, NFL (1988–1991) Denver Broncos
- Selwyn Lymon, NFL (no professional games played) Miami Dolphins
- Austin Mack, NFL (2020–present) New York Giants
- Le'Ron McClain, NFL (2007–2013) Baltimore Ravens, Kansas City Chiefs, San Diego Chargers
- Bernard Pollard, NFL (2006–2014) Kansas City Chiefs, Houston Texans, Baltimore Ravens, Tennessee Titans
- JaMarcus Shephard, football coach for the Oregon State Beavers
- Emil Sitko, NFL (1950–1952) San Francisco 49ers, Chicago Cardinals
- Ben Skowronek, NFL (2021–present) Los Angeles Rams, Houston Texans
- Jaylon Smith, NFL (2016–present) Dallas Cowboys, Green Bay Packers, New York Giants, New Orleans Saints, Las Vegas Raiders
- Lamar Smith, NFL (1994–2003) Seattle Seahawks, New Orleans Saints, Miami Dolphins, Carolina Panthers
- Rod Smith, NFL (2015–present) Seattle Seahawks, Dallas Cowboys, Tennessee Titans, Oakland Raiders
- Anthony Spencer, NFL (2007–2015) Dallas Cowboys, New Orleans Saints
- Joe Tippmann, NFL (2023–present) New York Jets
- Drue Tranquill, NFL (2019–present) Los Angeles Chargers, Kansas City Chiefs
- Elmer Wilkens, NFL (1925) Green Bay Packers
- Rod Woodson, NFL (1987–2003) Pittsburgh Steelers, San Francisco 49ers, Baltimore Ravens, Oakland Raiders, Pro Football Hall of Famer

=== Golf ===
- Amanda Blumenherst, U.S. Amateur champion
- Cathy Gerring, 3-time winner on LPGA Tour
- Billy Kratzert, 4-time winner on PGA Tour, sportscaster

=== Hockey ===
- Drake Batherson, NHL Ottawa Senators
- Gracen Hirschy, SDHL (2017–present), Linköping HC
- Fred Knipscheer, NHL Boston Bruins, St. Louis Blues
- Dale Purinton, NHL (1999/2000–2003/04) New York Rangers

=== Martial arts ===
- Jon Fitch, MMA fighter with UFC
- Dave Herman, MMA fighter with UFC
- Becky Levi, MMA fighter

=== Soccer ===
- DaMarcus Beasley, forward and defender
- Jamar Beasley, forward
- Rece Buckmaster, defender and midfielder
- Akil Watts, defender

=== Olympians ===
- Steve Bigelow, swimmer, 1988 Summer Olympics
- LeShundra "DeDee" Nathan, 2000 Summer Olympics
- Matt Vogel, swimmer, two-time Olympic gold medalist, 1976 Summer Olympics
- Sharon Wichman, swimmer, Olympic gold medalist, 1968 Summer Olympics
- Dan Zehr, swimmer, 1932 Summer Olympics

=== Volleyball ===
- Angie Akers, professional beach volleyball player
- Lloy Ball, Olympic gold medalist, 2008 Summer Olympics
- Dr. Don Shondell, author, head coach of Ball State University Cardinals men's volleyball program (1964–1998)

=== Other ===
- Angela Bradburn-Spangler, USA national high jump champion 1994
- Wes Malott, professional ten-pin bowler and member of the Professional Bowlers Association
- Eugene E. Parker, sports agent, 45th in Sports Illustrated's 101 most influential minorities in sports
- Ed Viesturs, mountaineer, first American to climb all 14 of the world's 8,000 meter peaks; fifth person ever to do so without the use of supplemental oxygen

== Writers ==
- E. Jean Carroll, author, journalist
- Constance Cumbey, author, lawyer
- Les Edgerton, author
- Ashley C. Ford, author and essayist
- Edith Hamilton, author, mythology expert
- Stephen King, best-selling author (spent parts of childhood in the city)
- Ross Lockridge Jr., novelist
- Patricia Lockwood, writer
- Michael Martone, author
- George Jean Nathan, author, drama critic, founder of American Spectator
- William Rockhill Nelson, founder of the Kansas City Star
- Emmanuel Ortiz, poet, writer
- Charlie Savage, New York Times reporter, 2007 Pulitzer Prize winner

== Business leaders ==
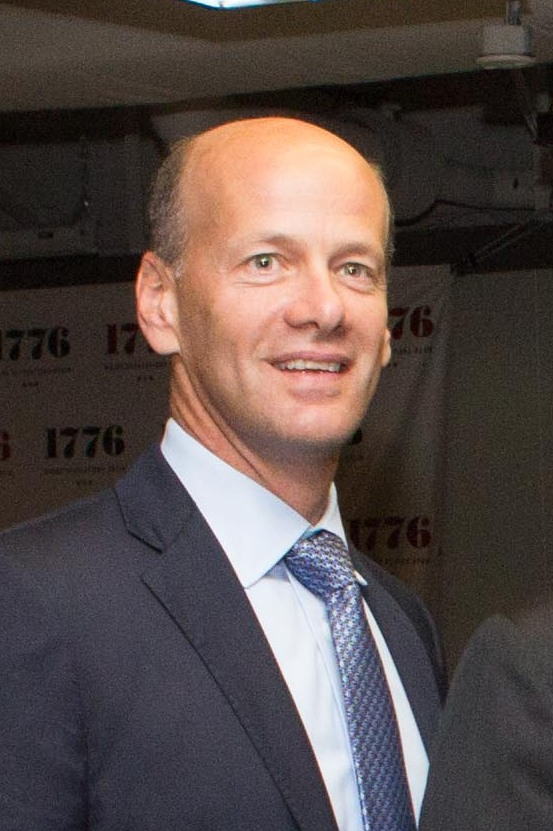
Gregory W. Becker, final CEO of Silicon Valley Bank, is from Fort Wayne.

- Gregory W. Becker, final CEO of Silicon Valley Bank (SVB)
- Patrick M. Byrne, president and CEO of Overstock.com
- Dirk Gates, founder and CEO of Xircom and Xirrus
- Jeff Hammerbacher, founder of Cloudera
- Angie Hicks, founder and CMO of AngiesList.com
- Zach Klein, co-founder of social networking site Vimeo
- Nord Krauskopf, founder of K&K Insurance; NASCAR Winston Cup Series race car owner (1966–1977)
- Russell W. Kruse, auctioneer, founder of Kruse International
- Cook Lougheed, philanthropist, entrepreneur, and Allen County councilman
- Dale W. McMillen, founder of Central Soya
- Cosette Simon, philanthropist, politician, first female mayor of Fort Wayne (1985)
- Chuck Surack, philanthropist, founder of Sweetwater Sound
- Dave Thomas, founder of Wendy's International
- Kevin Wall, Emmy Award-winning producer, environmentalist, founder of Live Earth
- Childe Wills, associate of Henry Ford
- Fred Zollner, industrialist, founder of the NBA and Fort Wayne Zollner Pistons

== Inventors and scientists ==
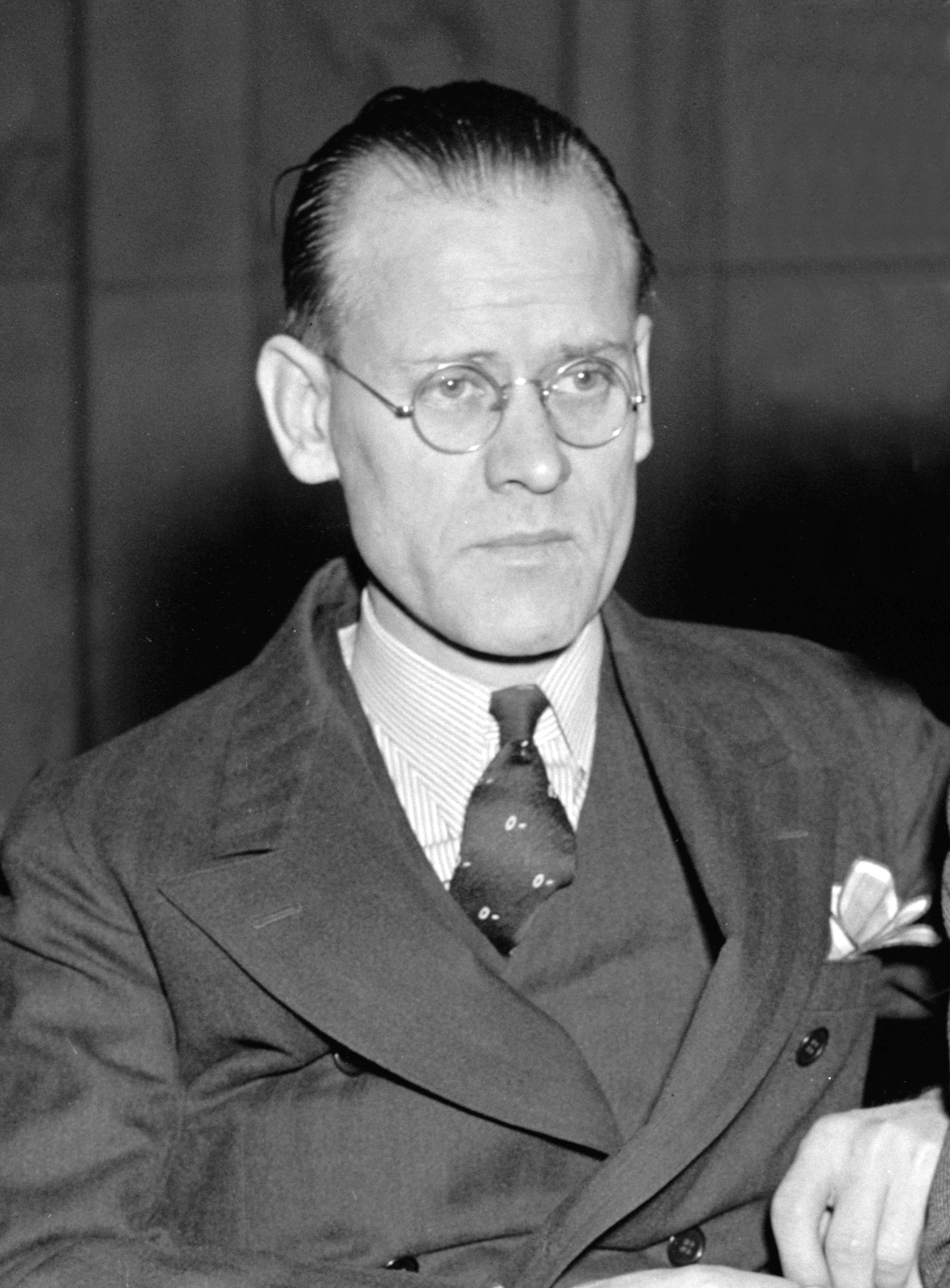
Philo T. Farnsworth, inventor of the modern television, lived in Fort Wayne from 1948 to 1967.

- Sylvanus Bowser, inventor of the gas pump
- Marion Donovan, inventor of the disposable diaper
- Philo T. Farnsworth, inventor of the television
- John Henry Holland, pioneer in the field of genetic algorithms
- Alfred Mellowes, inventor of the electric refrigerator

== Media ==
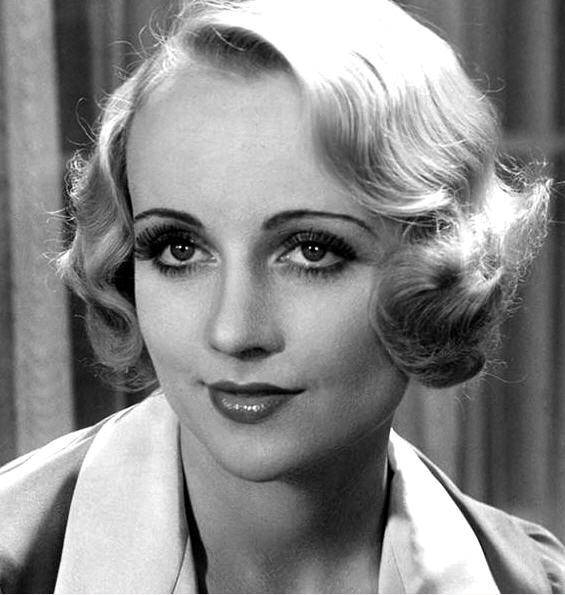
Fort Wayne native and film actress Carole Lombard

- Julia Barr, two-time Daytime Emmy award-winning actress, All My Children
- Jill Bennett, actress
- Nicole Briscoe, 1998 Miss Illinois Teen USA, host of ESPN2's NASCAR Now
- Eric Bruskotter, actor
- Dan Butler, actor
- Ann Colone, broadcaster, talkshow host
- Jenna Fischer, Emmy-nominated actress, The Office
- Sharon Gabet, actress
- Hilliard Gates, sportscaster
- Molly Hagan, actress
- Drake Hogestyn, actor
- Neil LaBute, director, screenwriter, playwright
- Stephanie Larimore, model, Playboy Playmate of the Month
- Carole Lombard, Oscar-nominated actress, My Man Godfrey
- Shelley Long, Golden Globe and Emmy-winning actress, Cheers
- Marilyn Maxwell, actress
- Patrick McVey, actor
- Robert Rusler, actor
- Andrea Russett, actress, Internet celebrity
- Chris Schenkel, sportscaster
- Carrie M. Shoaff, artist, author, potter, playwright, correspondent
- Herb Shriner, comedian, game show host
- Nancy Snyderman, MD, journalist, NBC News chief medical editor
- Zuzanna Szadkowski, actress
- Lyn Thomas, actress
- Randy Thompson, actor
- David Turnley, photographer
- Peter Turnley, photographer
- Herb Vigran, actor
- Dick York, Emmy-nominated actor, Bewitched

== Music ==
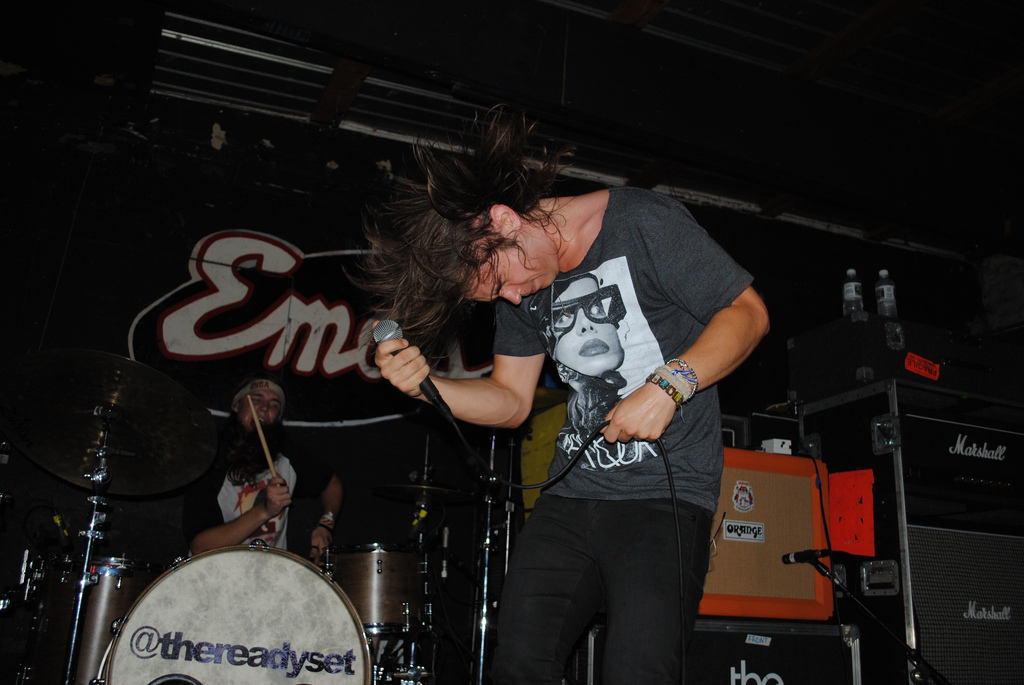
Fort Wayne native the Ready Set performing at Emo's in 2010

- Addison Agen, singer and finalist on The Voice
- Jeoffrey Benward, contemporary Christian singer, songwriter
- Sonny Charles, soul singer, Checkmates, Ltd., Steve Miller Band
- Daniel E. Gawthrop, contemporary classical composer
- Heather Headley, Tony and Grammy Award-winning Broadway actress and R&B singer
- Edwin C. Metcalfe, saxophonist with Spike Jones
- Megan Mullins, country singer
- Niyoki, gospel musician
- Amanda Perez, R&B singer
- Petra, Grammy-winning Christian rock band
- Downstait, hard rock and alternative metal band
- Jon Schaffer, heavy metal guitarist, songwriter, Iced Earth
- Troy Shondell, rock and roll singer, songwriter
- Jordan Witzigreuter, pop singer (stage name The Ready Set)

== Physicians and medical researchers ==
- Alice Hamilton, MD, first woman on faculty of Harvard Medical School; sister of Edith Hamilton
- Jane Henney, MD, first female commissioner of the FDA (1998–2001)
- Leonard A. Scheele, MD, seventh U.S. Surgeon General (1948–1956)
- Susan Smalley, Ph.D., first to conduct genome-wide study in ADHD
- Allen Steere, MD, identifier of Lyme disease

== Public servants ==
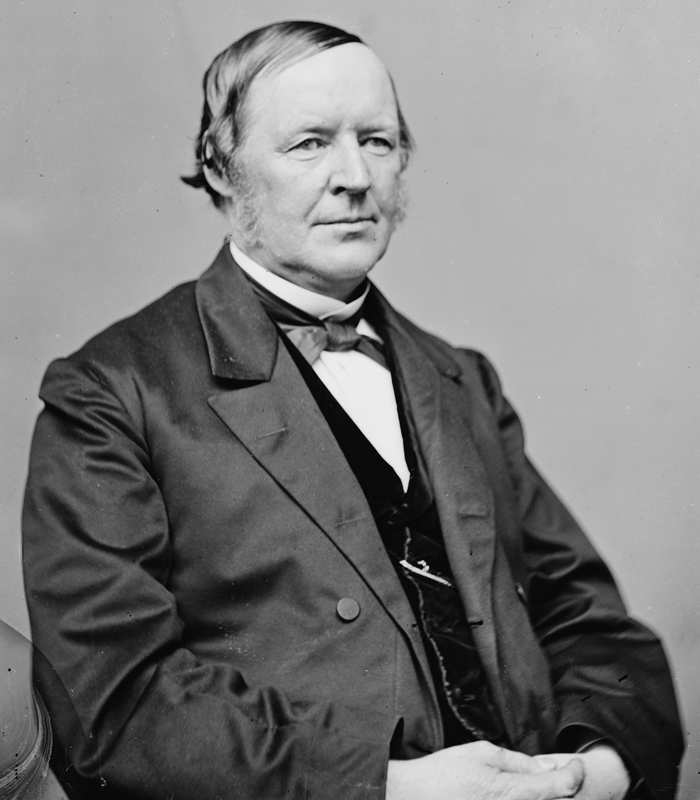
Former U.S. Secretary of the Treasury and first Comptroller of the Currency, Hugh McCulloch

- E. Ross Adair, U.S. representative (1951–1971), U.S. ambassador to Ethiopia (1971–1974)
- Robert E. Armstrong, Fort Wayne mayor (1975–1979), Allen County councilman (1990–2002)
- Paul W. Baade, major general in the United States Army
- Harry W. Baals, Fort Wayne mayor (1934–1947, 1951–1954)
- Paul Frank Baer, first flying ace in American military aviation
- Henry C. Berghoff, Fort Wayne mayor (1901–1906) and co-founder of the Herman J. Berghoff Brewing Company
- Tim Berry, Indiana state treasurer (1999–2007), Indiana state auditor (2007–2013), Indiana Republican Party chairman (2013–2015)
- Samuel Bigger, Indiana state representative (1834–1835), Indiana Circuit Court judge (1835–1840), seventh governor of Indiana (1840–1843)
- James W. Borden, judge and diplomat
- Randy Borror, Indiana state representative (2001–2010)
- Claude Bowers, writer, U.S. ambassador to Spain (1933–1939), U.S. ambassador to Chile (1939–1953)
- Samuel Brenton, U.S. representative (1851–1853, 1855–1857)
- Susan Brooks, deputy mayor of Indianapolis (1998–1999), U.S. attorney for Southern Indiana (2001–2007), U.S. representative (2013–2021)
- James R. Clapper, director of National Intelligence (2010–2017)
- Daniel R. Coats, U.S. representative (1981–1989), U.S. ambassador to Germany (2001–2005), U.S. senator (1989–1999, 2011–2017)
- Walpole G. Colerick, U.S. representative (1879–1883)
- Joseph K. Edgerton, U.S. representative (1863–1865)
- Shirley Adele Field, judge, Oregon state representative (1956–1960, 1962–1966)
- Dan Flanagan, lawyer, justice of the Indiana Supreme Court (1953–1954), Allen County Republican Party leader
- Eliza George, Civil War nurse (1863–1865)
- Phil GiaQuinta, Indiana state representative (2006–present)
- George W. Gillie, U.S. representative (1939–1949)
- Timothy Goeglein, White House Office of Public Engagement and Intergovernmental Affairs deputy director (2001–2008)
- Allen Hamilton, Allen County sheriff (1824–1826), Fort Wayne postmaster (1825–1831), Allen County auditor, clerk, and recorder (1831–1838)
- Mitch Harper, Indiana state representative (1978–1990), Fort Wayne city councilman (2008–2016)
- Paul Helmke, Fort Wayne mayor (1988–2000), president of Brady Campaign to Prevent Gun Violence (2006–2011), founder of the Civic Leaders Center at Indiana University (2013–)
- Tom Henry, Fort Wayne city councilman (1984–2004), Fort Wayne Mayor (2008–2024)
- Richard E. Hoagland, U.S. ambassador to Tajikistan (2003–2006), U.S. ambassador to Kazakhstan (2008–2011), principal deputy assistant secretary of state for South and Central Asia (2013–2015)
- William J. Hosey, Fort Wayne mayor (1905–1909, 1913–1917, 1921–1925, 1929–1934)
- Merchant W. Huxford, doctor, Fort Wayne mayor (1845–1849)
- Samuel D. Jackson, U.S. senator (1944)
- Paul G. Jasper, justice of the Indiana Supreme Court (1949–1953)
- Matt Kelty, politician, architect
- Edward H. Kruse, U.S. representative (1949–1951)
- Henry Lawton, U.S. Army general (1861–1865, 1867–1899), namesake of Lawton, Oklahoma
- Thomas R. Marshall, 27th governor of Indiana (1909–1913), 28th U.S. Vice President (1913–1921)
- Hugh McCulloch, first Comptroller of the Currency (1863–1865), U.S. Secretary of the Treasury (1865–1869, 1884–1885)
- Robert Meyers, Fort Wayne mayor (1954–1959), Allen County Superior Court judge (1971–1985)
- Winfield Moses, Fort Wayne city councilman (1972–1979), mayor (1980–1987), Indiana state representative (1992–2012)
- Cherrish Pryor, Indiana state representative (2008–present)
- Ben Quayle, U.S. representative (2011–2013)
- Graham Richard, entrepreneur, Fort Wayne mayor (2000–2008)
- James M. Robinson, judge, U.S. representative (1897–1905)
- Mark Souder, U.S. representative (1995–2010)
- Harold J. Warner, Oregon Supreme Court chief justice (1955–1957)
- James Bain White, U.S. representative (1887–1889)
- George W. Wood, first Fort Wayne mayor (1840–1841)
- James Worden, twelfth Fort Wayne mayor (1865–1866), justice of the Indiana Supreme Court (1858–1865, 1871–1882)

== Religious leaders ==
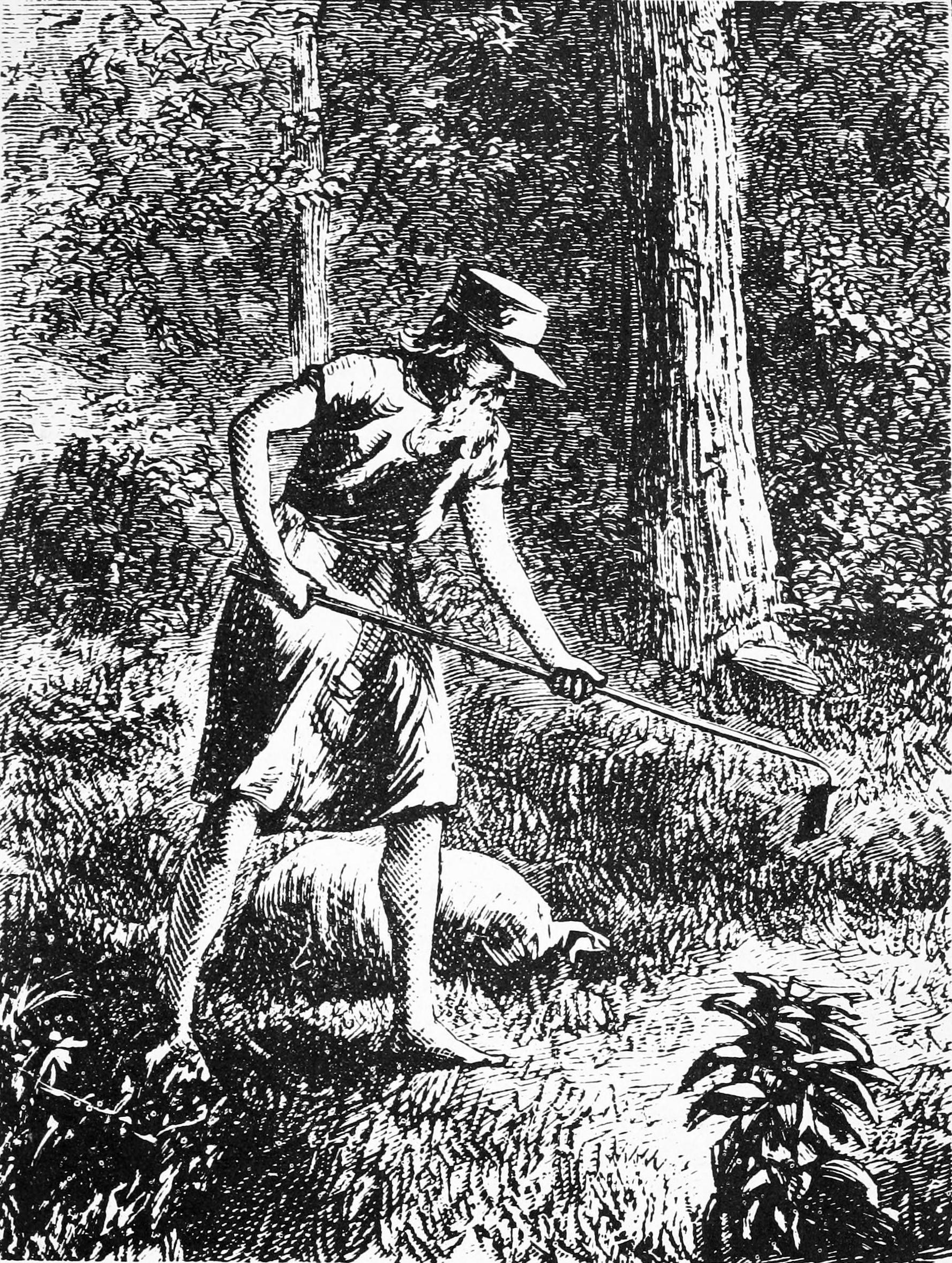
John Chapman, also known as Johnny Appleseed, is believed to have died in Fort Wayne.

- Herman Joseph Alerding, bishop of Roman Catholic Diocese of Fort Wayne-South Bend (1900–1924)
- Johnny Appleseed, Swedenborgian, nurseryman, missionary, American folklore figure
- John Michael D'Arcy, auxiliary bishop of Archdiocese of Boston (1974–1985), bishop of Roman Catholic Diocese of Fort Wayne-South Bend (1985–2009)
- William Edward McManus, auxiliary bishop of Archdiocese of Chicago (1967–1976), bishop of Roman Catholic Diocese of Fort Wayne-South Bend (1976–1985)
- Archbishop John F. Noll, bishop of Roman Catholic Diocese of Fort Wayne-South Bend (1925–1956), founder of Our Sunday Visitor
- Wilhelm Sihler, Lutheran minister and founder of Concordia Theological Seminary
- Alexa Suelzer, Roman Catholic nun, author, educator, theologian
- Robert Thieme, author, pastor of Berachah Church (1950–2003)

== Miscellaneous ==
- Charlie Brandt, serial killer
- Juan Rodriguez Chavez, serial killer
- Dean Corll, serial killer
- Louis Edward Curdes, flying ace of WWII
- Alexander Ewing, soldier during the American Revolutionary War and the War of 1812, later a founding resident of Fort Wayne
- Bud Mahurin, United States Air Force officer and aviator
- Florence M. Montgomery, art historian and curator
- Alixa Naff, historian
- ML Procise, concert sound engineer
- Margaret Ringenberg, aviator
- Ernest Gottlieb Sihler, professor of classics at New York University
- Art Smith, aviator
- Homer Van Meter, infamous bank robber who worked with John Dillinger
