= Tragedy (Thomas Wayne song) =

Song by Gerald H. Nelson and Fred B. Burch

Single by Thomas Wayne and the DeLons
- B-side: "Saturday Date"
- Released: 1959
- Recorded: 1958
- Genre: Rockabilly
- Length: 2:10
- Label: Fernwood
- Songwriters: Gerald H. Nelson, Fred B. Burch
- Producer: Scotty Moore

Thomas Wayne and the DeLons singles chronology
"Tragedy" (1959)	"Just Beyond" (1959)

"Tragedy"

Single by The Fleetwoods

from the album Softly
- B-side: "Little Miss Sad One"
- Released: 1961
- Genre: Pop
- Length: 2:47
- Label: Dolton No.40
- Songwriters: Gerald H. Nelson, Fred B. Burch
- Producer: Bob Reisdorff

The Fleetwoods singles chronology
"The Last One to Know" (1960)	"Tragedy" (1961)	"(He's) The Great Imposter" (1961)

"Tragedy" is a song by Gerald H. Nelson and Fred B. Burch.

== Thomas Wayne recording ==
A recording of the song by Thomas Wayne and the DeLons rose to number 5 on the Billboard Top 100 in 1959. Wayne's hit version was released on Memphis, Tennessee-based Fernwood Records, which was owned by Ronald "Slim" Wallace from 1957 to 1965. The DeLons consisted of Wayne's girlfriend Nancy Reed and her friends Sandra Brown and Carol Moss, and the band consisted of Elvis Presley's original guitarist Scotty Moore (who also produced the single) and original bassist Bill Black.

Wayne was a one-hit wonder who cut around 20 songs including a remake of his hit for the reactivated Sun label which sounds similar to the original. Some of his other songs were hits for others such as "This Time" (Troy Shondell) and "Girl Next Door Went a Walkin'" (Elvis Presley).

Despite all of his recordings for three different labels before his death in a car crash on August 15, 1971, he never cut an album and there was no CD issued of his songs until 2021 when Jasmine Records released every Thomas Wayne recording from his debut in 1958 to the end of 1962.

== Other recordings ==
- A 1961 cover version by The Fleetwoods rose to #10 on the charts.
- Brian Hyland also recorded it in 1969, but it only made it to #56.
- Wings also recorded a version of the song for the planned 2-LP set Red Rose Speedway. The idea for the 2-LP set was later abandoned and instead they released a single LP with the same title, but without "Tragedy". Wings' version was officially released on the 2018 deluxe edition of Red Rose Speedway which included the original proposed double album.
- Brenda Lee recorded a version of the song on her 1961 album All the Way.
- Actress and singer Bette Midler recorded a version of the song on her 1976 album Songs for the New Depression.
- Pop and country singer Ronnie Dove recorded a country version of the song in 1976, although it failed to chart.
