= Marilyn Quayle =

Second Lady of the United States from 1989 to 1993

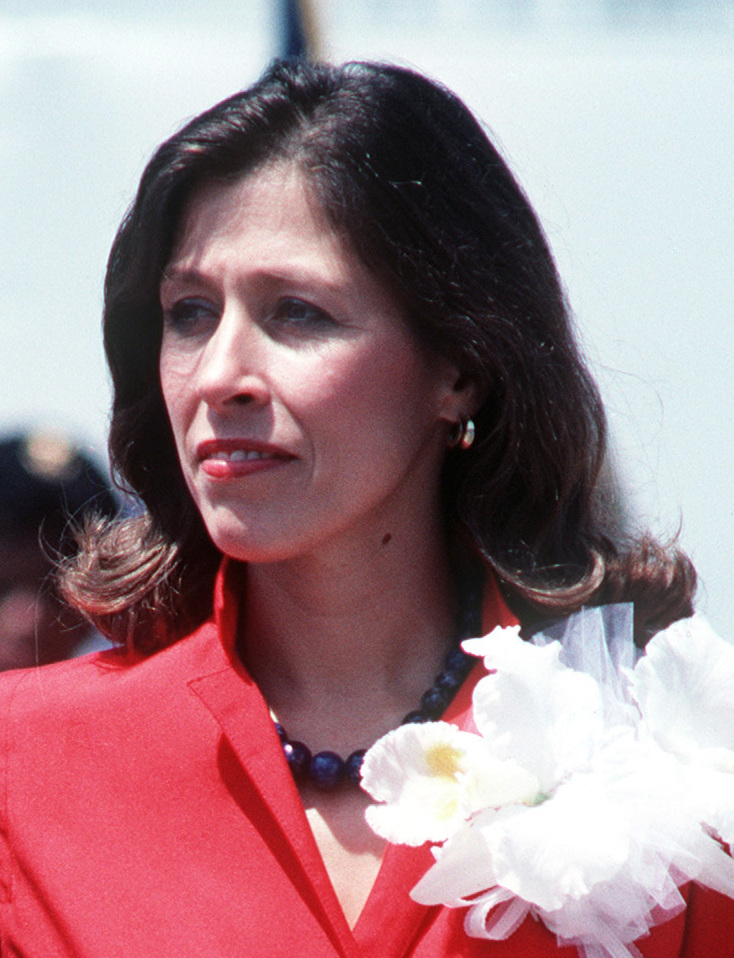
- Quayle in 1984

Second Lady of the United States
- In role January 20, 1989 – January 20, 1993
- Vice President: Dan Quayle
- Preceded by: Barbara Bush
- Succeeded by: Tipper Gore

Personal details
- Born: Marilyn Tucker; July 29, 1949 (age 77) Indianapolis, Indiana, U.S.
- Party: Republican
- Spouse: Dan Quayle (m. 1972)
- Children: Tucker; Ben; Corinne
- Relatives: Quayle family (by marriage)
- Education: Purdue University, West Lafayette (BA); Indiana University, Indianapolis (JD)

Marilyn Tucker Quayle (née Tucker; born July 29, 1949) is an American lawyer and novelist. She is married to the 44th vice president of the United States, Dan Quayle, and served as the second lady of the United States from 1989 until 1993.

== Early life and education ==
Marilyn Tucker was born in the Meridian-Kessler area of Indianapolis, Indiana, to Mary Alice (née Craig, 1915–1975) and Warren Samuel Tucker (1912–2004). The fourth of six children, she has three sisters (Nancy, Sally, and Janet) and two brothers (James and William). Her parents were both doctors. Her maternal grandfather was born in Maybole, Scotland. She had a strict Christian upbringing. The Tuckers were longtime admirers of Colonel Robert B. Thieme Jr., the founder and former pastor of Berachah Church in Houston. Years later, when media attention focused on her family's religious beliefs, Marilyn Quayle said in an NBC interview: "I grew up with my mother listening to (Thieme's) tapes. ... I have never listened to him on social issues. I didn't even know that he espoused any." She does defend his biblical teachings.

She attended Broad Ripple High School and subsequently received a bachelor's degree in political science from Purdue University. While attending college, she served as a pompom girl and as treasurer of her freshman class. She later attended law school at night and earned a J.D. at Indiana University Robert H. McKinney School of Law. There, she met Dan Quayle, the son of a newspaper publisher. The two were assigned to work together on a draft version of Indiana's death penalty law. A courtship quickly developed, and they were married by their law school dean just a few weeks later, on November 18, 1972. In 1974, they both passed the bar exam; she had given birth to their first child just a few days before the exam.

== Career ==
Marilyn and Dan moved back to Huntington, Indiana, and opened a joint law practice, Quayle and Quayle. She did most of the legal work; he worked for his father's newspaper and prepared to enter politics. In 1976, he was elected to Congress as a Republican, whereupon they suspended their law practice. In 1980, he was elected to the Senate.

== Second Lady of the United States (1989-1993) ==
In 1988, Dan was elected Vice President on George H. W. Bush's ticket. Throughout her husband's political career, Marilyn was "always her husband's closest and most candid advisor." She campaigned independently during the presidential campaign. During the 1988 campaign, she was often portrayed in the press as smart, cold, and tough – the power behind her husband. But as second lady, she played a mostly traditional role as hostess, while being an active and involved mother to their three young children. She also worked for causes such as early diagnosis of breast cancer (her mother died of breast cancer at the age of 56). With her sister Nancy, she also published a novel, Embrace the Serpent, a thriller about the wife of a vice president.

During the 1992 presidential campaign, Marilyn was an active campaigner, delivering a speech at the Republican National Convention and spending more than 40 days on the campaign trail. In her speeches, she took a strong "family values" theme, and she was very popular with conservatives. Ultimately, Bush and Quayle lost reelection that year, and the Quayles returned to Huntington, where she joined an Indianapolis law firm. The couple later moved to Arizona, where the former vice president had spent much of his formative years.

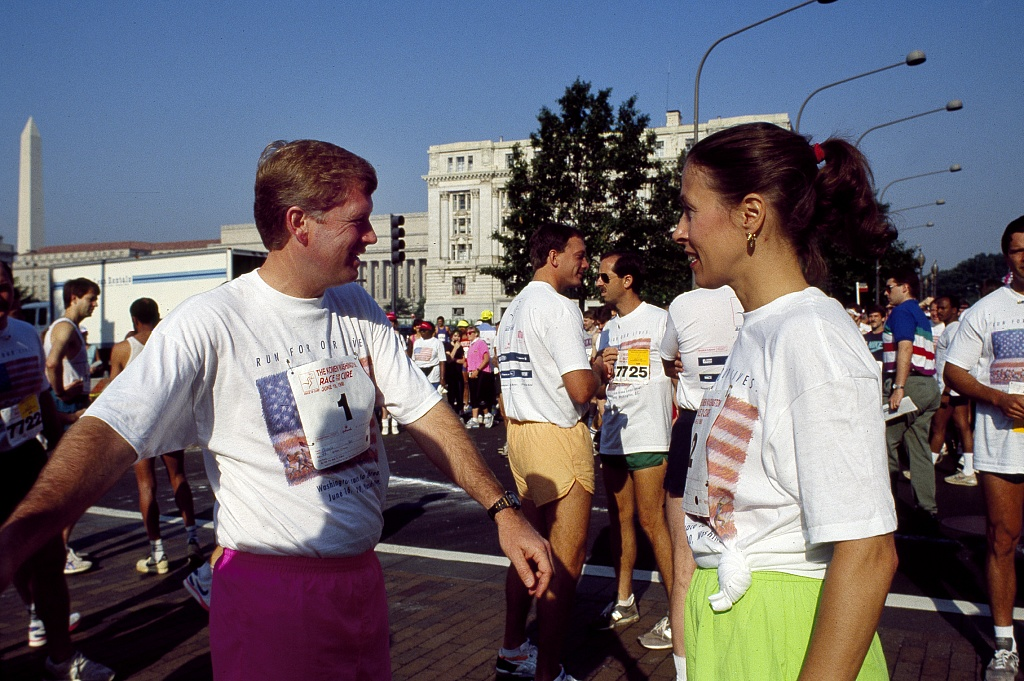
Vice President Dan Quayle and Second Lady Marilyn Quayle at Race for the Cure on Pennsylvania Avenue, Washington, D.C. in 1990.

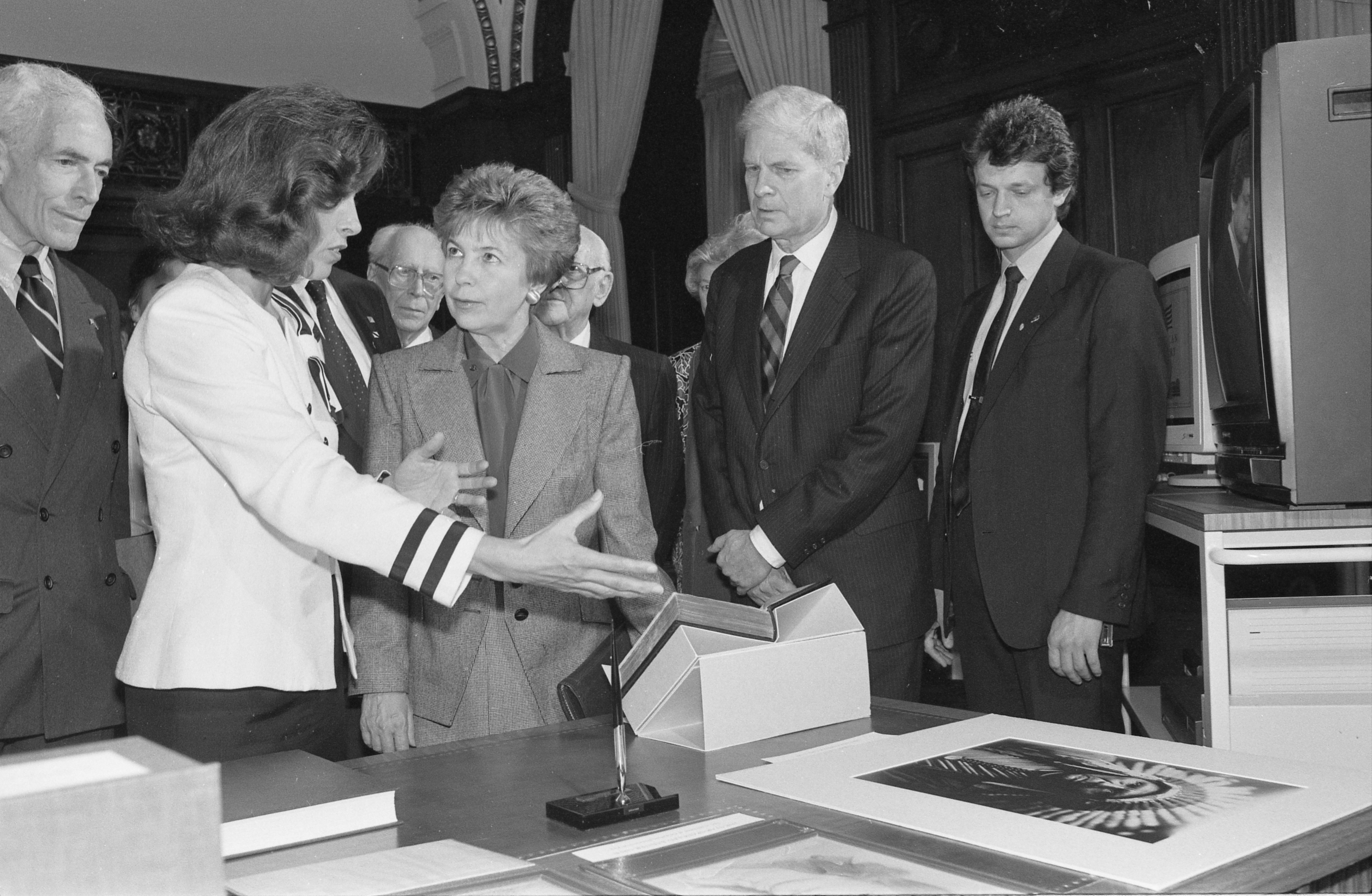
Marilyn Quayle with Raisa Gorbachev at a display of books and other items at the Library of Congress in 1990

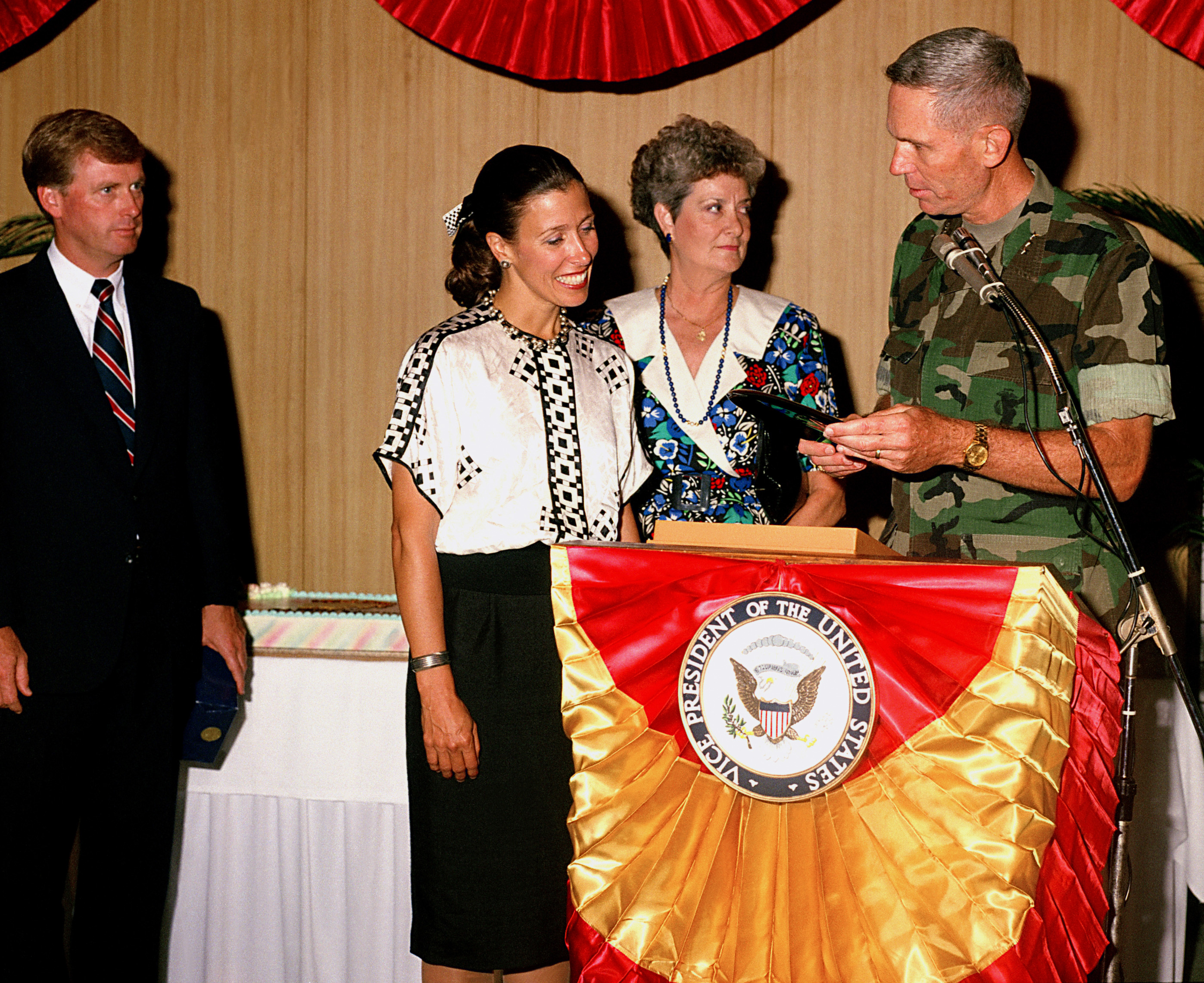
Quayle accepts a gift from Lieutenant General Norman H. Smith

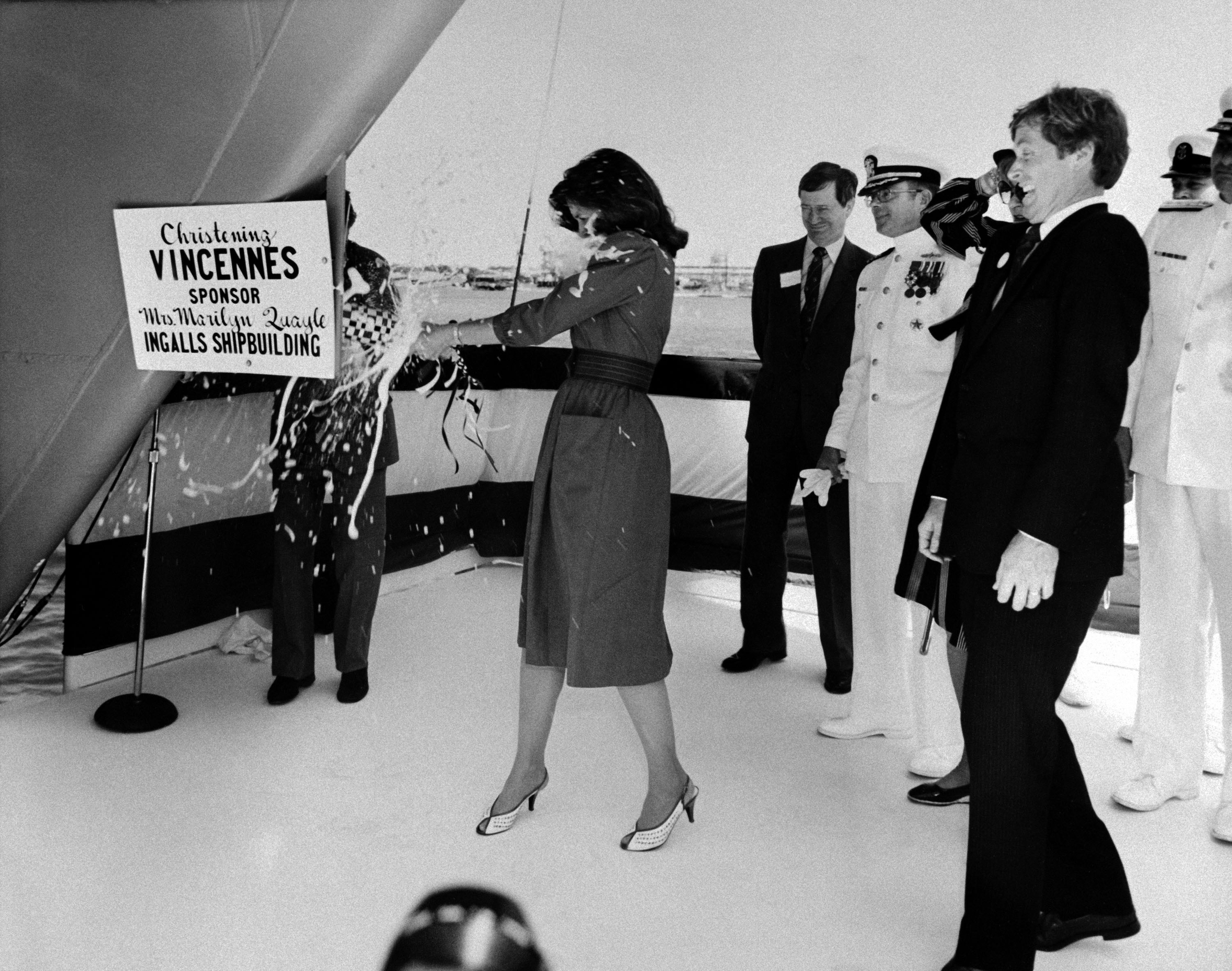
Quayle christens the Aegis guided missile cruiser USS VINCENNES

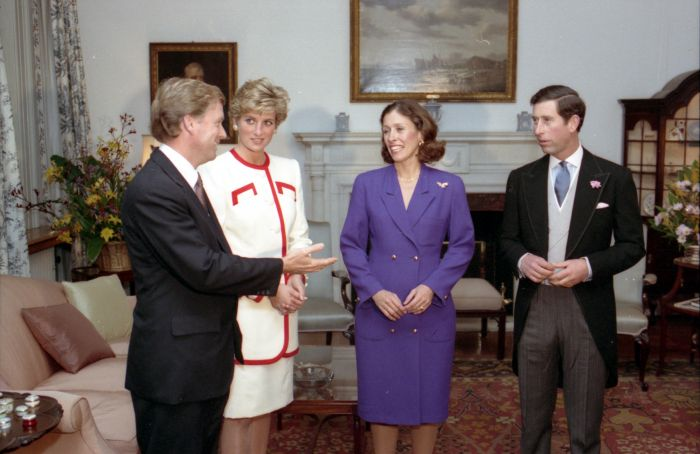
Quayle with her husband and future King Prince Charles and Diana, Princess of Wales.

== Subsequent activities (1993-present) ==
In 1996, Quayle narrated an advertisement for Indiana gubernatorial candidate Stephen Goldsmith. In 2010, she narrated an advertisement for Georgia gubernatorial candidate Karen Handel.

In 2011, she was reported to have phoned Arizona governor Jan Brewer about an Arizona redistricting plan that was detrimental to her son, Congressman Ben Quayle.

== Personal life ==
The Quayles live in Paradise Valley, Arizona. They have three children: two sons, Tucker, founder of an investment company called Tynwald Capital, and Benjamin, who served as a member of the United States House of Representatives from Arizona's 3rd Congressional District from 2011 to 2013; and a daughter, Corinne.

== Books ==
- Quayle, Marilyn T.; Northcott, Nancy T. (1992). Embrace the serpent (1. ed.). New York: Crown Publishers. ISBN 978-0-517-58822-2.
- The Campaign: A Novel (1996) (ISBN 0-310-20231-0)
- Moments that Matter (1999) (ISBN 0-8499-5529-7)

Honorary titles
Preceded by Barbara Bush	Second Lady of the United States; 1989–1993	Succeeded by Tipper Gore
U.S. order of precedence (ceremonial)
Preceded by Dan Quayle as Former Vice President	Order of precedence of the United States as Former Second Lady	Succeeded by Al Gore as Former Vice President
