= The Fleetwoods =

American vocal group from Olympia, Washington

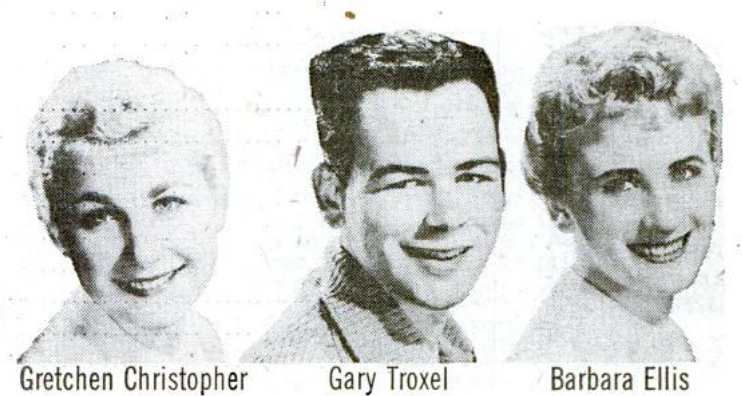
- The Fleetwoods in 1960

Background information
- Origin: Olympia, Washington, U.S.
- Genres: Pop; doo-wop
- Years active: 1958–1983
- Labels: Dolton; Liberty
- Past members: Gary Troxel; Gretchen Christopher; Barbara Ellis

The Fleetwoods were an American vocal group from Olympia, Washington, whose members were Gary Troxel (born November 28, 1939), Gretchen Christopher (born February 29, 1940), and Barbara Ellis (born February 20, 1940). In 1959, they twice topped the Billboard Hot 100 with their single hits "Come Softly to Me" and "Mr. Blue".

== Early history ==
The band members met as high school students in Olympia, Washington. Originally the band consisted of only Gretchen Christopher and Barbara Ellis, but Gary Troxel was asked to accompany them with jazz trumpet, later switching to vocals. They then started performing in 1958 as "Two Girls and a Guy" but later changed the name to the Fleetwoods after the Fleetwood telephone exchange.

In 1959, they were noticed by producer and Dolton Records founder Bob Reisdorff, and together they recorded their self-written first hit, "Come Softly to Me," which shot to No. 1 in Billboard and was also covered by others. The UK's Frankie Vaughan and the Kaye Sisters had a top 10 chart hit in the United Kingdom with the song, though the Fleetwoods exceeded them, simultaneously charting in the UK's top 5. Their second hit, "Graduation's Here," was co-written by Ellis and Christopher, with Troxel later adding a scat line in counterpoint. That one was followed by "Mr. Blue," which, like "Come Softly To Me", also topped the US pop chart.

The Fleetwoods continued recording into the 1960s. They hit the Top 10 again with a cover of Thomas Wayne's "Tragedy" in 1961. Though they went on to have a total of eleven hits on the Hot 100, the beginning of the end for the group came when Troxel had to fulfill his obligation to go onto active duty in the United States Navy, as he had joined the Naval Reserve in 1956. Additionally, the British Invasion of the mid 1960s changed the public's taste. The trio's hits ended in 1963 with Barbara Ellis singing lead on "Goodnight My Love". Vic Dana, who was to go on to a successful solo career, replaced Troxel in the group when he was in the service, solely for live performances.

== Later years ==
In the late 1970s, Troxel was working in a plywood plant in Washington, Ellis was managing a trailer park in California and Christopher was a housewife and modern jazz dance teacher in Washington at St. Martin's College and at Evergreen State College. Ellis is now retired from performing. In 1983, Troxel gave his written resignation from The Fleetwoods, leaving Christopher as manager with the sole authority to contract for both the original and replacement Fleetwoods. Troxel formed a new Fleetwoods group in the 1980s. His group has been performing regularly since the mid 1980s doing several "oldies" concerts each year, including two performances on the PBS Doo Wop, Pop and Soul Generations (My Music) series.

While Christopher trained replacement Fleetwoods, she also resumed her solo music career, billing herself as "Gretchen Christopher of the Fleetwoods." Both Troxel and Christopher each continue to perform and occasionally release new recordings. A new Fleetwoods version of "Graduation's Here" appeared on Christopher's autobiographical solo album, Gretchen's Sweet Sixteen (Suite 16), which is one of the 2007 Billboard critics' picks for 10 Best Albums of the Year. It included both the hit arrangement of "Come Softly To Me" and an a cappella version, with Christopher singing all the parts.

Since their 1988 induction into the Northwest Area Music Association Hall of Fame and their 2005 induction into the Olympia High School Alumni Association Hall of Fame, The Fleetwoods have been inducted into both the Vocal Group Hall of Fame and the Doo-Wop Hall of Fame of America in 2006.

The November 2007 release of Gretchen's Sweet Sixteen (Suite 16) was launched in Las Vegas with the second Annual Cool Bobby B Doo Wop Convention and Grand Finale Concert, headlined by 'The Fleetwoods starring Gretchen Christopher.' A year later, though, all three originals were inducted and invited to the Vocal Group Hall of Fame. Christopher was the only original member of the Fleetwoods who accepted, attended and performed, dedicating songs to each of her absent partners. Troxel had every intention of attending but decided it was more important to be with his wife, because of her breast cancer treatment.

In 2000, Troxel and his wife Jenifer lost Troxel v. Granville, a landmark grandparents' rights case before the Supreme Court of the United States, a case that arose from the Troxels' petition "for the right to visit their deceased son's daughters," since Granville, the girls' mother, did not oppose all visitation, but objected to the amount sought by the Troxels. The court held that under the United States Constitution, non-parents seeking custody or visitation rights of a child against the wishes of the child's parents must prove that the parents are not acting in the best interest of the child in refusing custody or visitation.

In 2008 and 2009, Christopher testified before the Washington State Senate in support of the Truth in Music Advertising Bill, which, in 2009, passed both the Washington State House and Senate unanimously and was signed into law by Governor Chris Gregoire. The law provides that a performing group shall not be advertised by the name of a recording group, unless the performing group includes at least one original member from the hit-making recording group, a member, moreover, who is authorized to use the name. The authorization for the Fleetwoods resides solely with Christopher, according to the performance contract and resignation signed by Troxel.

To date, the Fleetwoods' two No. 1 singles are the earliest on the Billboard Hot 100 with all of the group members still alive.

== Discography ==
=== Albums ===
==== Original albums ====
- Mr. Blue (1959)
- The Fleetwoods (1960)
- Softly (1961)
- Deep in a Dream (1961)
- The Best Goodies of the Oldies (1961)
- For Lovers by Night (1963)
- Goodnight My Love (1963)
- Before and After (1964)
- Folk Rock (1965)

==== Compilations ====
- The Fleetwoods' Greatest Hits (1962, No. 71 US)
- In a Mellow Mood (1966)
- The Very Best of the Fleetwoods (1974)
- Buried Treasure (1983)
- Come Softly to Me: The Very Best of the Fleetwoods (1993)

=== Singles ===
A-Side	B-Side From same album as A-side except where indicated	Year	Label + Cat. No.	Chart positions				Album
A-Side	B-Side From same album as A-side except where indicated	Year	Label + Cat. No.	US Hot 100	US R&B	CAN	UK	Album
"Come Softly to Me"	"I Care So Much"	1959	Dolphin 1 Liberty 55188	1	5	1	6	Mr. Blue
"Graduation's Here"	"Oh Lord Let It Be" (from Mr. Blue)	1959	Dolton 3	39	—	38	—	The Fleetwoods Greatest Hits
"Mr. Blue"		1959	Dolton 5	1	3	1	—	Mr. Blue
	"You Mean Everything to Me"	1959	Dolton 5	84	—	—	—	Mr. Blue
"Outside My Window"	"Magic Star" (from Goodnight My Love)	1960	Dolton 15	28	—	—	—	The Fleetwoods: Gretchen, Gary and Barbara
"Runaround"	"Truly Do"	1960	Dolton 22	23	—	25	—	The Fleetwoods: Gretchen, Gary and Barbara
"The Last One to Know"	"Dormilona"	1960	Dolton 27	96	—	—	—	Softly
"Confidential"	"I Love You So" (from Softly)	1960	Dolton 30	—	—	—	—	Mr. Blue
"Bazoom (I Need Your Lovin')"	"Little White Cloud That Cried" (from Softly)	1961	Dolton 37 (cancelled)	—	—	—	—	The Fleetwoods Sing The Best Goodies of The Oldies
"Tragedy"	"Little Miss Sad One"	1961	Dolton 40	10	—	7	—	Softly
"(He's) The Great Imposter"	"Poor Little Girl"	1961	Dolton 45	30	—	7	—	Deep In A Dream
"Billy Old Buddy"	"Trouble"	1962	Dolton 49	—	—	—	—	Non-LP tracks
"Jimmy Beware"	"Bazoom (I Need Your Lovin')" (from The Fleetwoods Sing The Best Goodies of The Oldies)	1962	Dolton 54 (cancelled)	—	—	—	—	Goodnight My Love
"Lovers by Night, Strangers by Day"	"They Tell Me It's Summer" (Non-LP track)	1962	Dolton 62	36	—	—	—	The Fleetwoods Sing for Lovers By Night
"Sure Is Lonesome Downtown"	"You Should Have Been There" (Non-LP track)	1963	Dolton 74	114 (B-side)	—	—	—	Goodnight My Love
"Goodnight My Love"	"Jimmy Beware"	1963	Dolton 75	32	—	—	—	Goodnight My Love
"What'll I Do"	"Baby Bye-O"	1963	Dolton 86	—	—	—	—	Non-LP tracks
"Ruby Red Baby Blue"	"Lonesome Town"	1964	Dolton 93	134	—	—	—	Non-LP tracks
"Ska Light, Ska Bright" (Jamaica Ska)	"Ten Times Blue"	1964	Dolton 97	—	—	—	—	Non-LP tracks
"Mr. Sandman"	"This Is My Prayer (Non Ho l'Età Per Amarti)"	1964	Dolton 98	113	—	—	—	Before and After
"Before and After (Losing You)"	"Lonely Is as Lonely Does"	1964	Dolton 302	—	—	—	—	Before and After
"Come Softly to Me" (1965 Version)	"I'm Not Jimmy"	1965	Dolton 307	—	—	—	—	Non-LP tracks
"Rainbow"	"Just as I Need You"	1965	Dolton 310	—	—	—	—	Non-LP tracks
"For Lovin' Me"	"This Is Where I See Her"	1966	Dolton 315	—	—	—	—	Folk Rock
"—" denotes releases that did not chart or were not released in that territory.
