= Danny Thomas =

American actor and comedian (1912–1991)

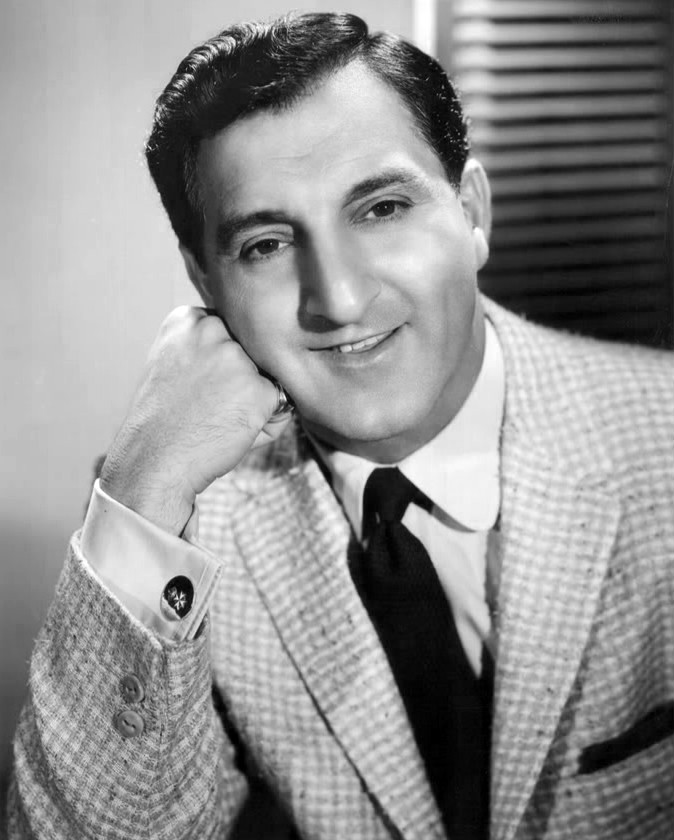
- Thomas in 1957
- Born: Amos Muzyad Yaqoob Kairouz; January 6, 1912; Deerfield, Michigan, U.S.
- Died: February 6, 1991 (aged 79); Los Angeles, California, U.S.
- Burial place: Memphis, Tennessee, U.S.
- Other names: Amos Jacobs Kairouz; Amos Jacobs
- Occupations: Actor; comedian; producer; singer
- Years active: 1932–1991
- Spouse: Rose Marie Cassaniti (m. 1936)
- Children: 3, including Tony and Marlo Thomas

Amos Muzyad Yaqoob Kairouz (January 6, 1912 – February 6, 1991), known professionally as Danny Thomas, was an American entertainer, producer, and philanthropist. After launching his career in the 1940s in radio and cinema, he created and starred in the 1953–1964 television sitcom Make Room for Daddy / The Danny Thomas Show, and went on to produce a number of successful television programs. In 1962, he leveraged his celebrity status to establish St. Jude Children's Research Hospital, a leading center in pediatrics research and treatment, with a focus on pediatric cancer. He was the father of Marlo Thomas, Terre Thomas, and Tony Thomas.

== Early life ==
One of 10 children, Amos Muzyad Yaqoob Kairouz (Arabic: أموس مزيد يعقوب كيروز) was born on January 6, 1912, in Deerfield, Michigan, to Charles Yaqoob Kairouz (Arabic: تشارلز يعقوب كيروز) and his wife Margaret Taouk (Arabic: مارغريت طوق كيروز). His parents were Maronite Catholic immigrants from what is now Bsharri, North Governorate, Lebanon. Thomas was raised in Toledo, Ohio, attending St. Francis de Sales Church and Woodward High School, where he went by the name Amos Jacobs.

Bishop Samuel Stritch of Toledo performed Thomas' confirmation in the Catholic Church in 1921. Stritch, a native of Tennessee, was a lifelong spiritual advisor to Thomas, and would later advise him to locate the St. Jude Hospital in Memphis.

== Career outside of television ==
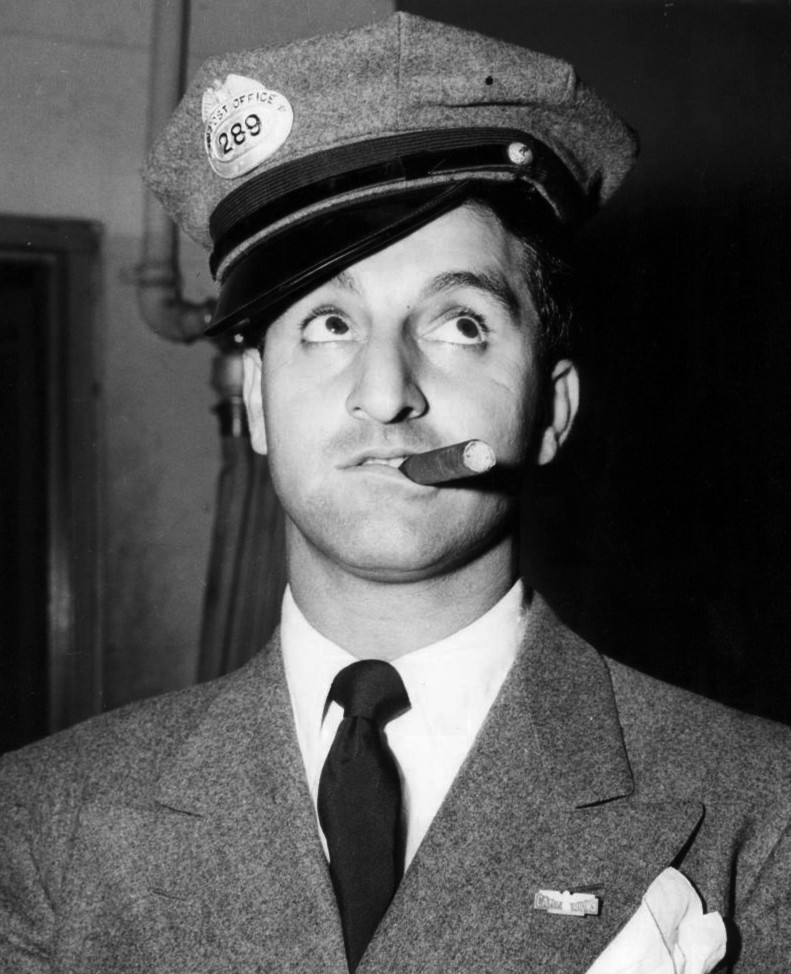
Thomas as Jerry Dingle, 1945

=== Radio ===
In 1932, Thomas began performing on radio in Detroit at WMBC on The Happy Hour Club. Thomas first performed under his anglicized birth name, "Amos Jacobs Kairouz". Thomas first reached mass audiences on network radio in the 1940s playing shifty brother-in-law Amos in The Bickersons, which began as sketches on the music-comedy show Drene Time, starring Don Ameche and Frances Langford. Thomas also portrayed himself as a scatterbrained Lothario on this show. His other network radio work included a stint as Jerry Dingle the postman on Fanny Brice's The Baby Snooks Show. In the early 1950s he made several appearances on the popular NBC variety program The Big Show hosted by stage legend Tallulah Bankhead.

Thomas also had his own radio program, The Danny Thomas Show. The 30-minute weekly variety show was on ABC from 1942 to 1943 and on CBS from 1947 to 1948.

=== Nightclub career ===
In 1940, after he moved to Chicago, Thomas did not want his friends and family to know he had gone back to working in clubs where the salary was better, so he came up with the pseudonym "Danny Thomas", after two of his brothers.

=== Films ===
After his two late 1940s films with Margaret O'Brien, Thomas appeared with Betty Grable in the musical Call Me Mister (1951). He portrayed songwriter Gus Kahn opposite Doris Day in the 1951 film biography I'll See You in My Dreams. He then starred in The Jazz Singer opposite the popular contemporary vocalist Peggy Lee, a 1952 remake of the 1927 original.

=== Music ===
In 1952, Thomas recorded several Arabic folk songs with Toufic Barham for a Saint Jude Hospital Foundation fundraiser record. The songs later appeared on the re-issue album The Music of Arab-Americans: A Retrospective Collection.

It was reported in the 28 October 1967 issue of Billboard that Thomas was on the International Tape Cartridge Corporation roster. A series of releases had begun with six cartridges of lush orchestral music that he was to select. According to ITCC president Larry Finley, the releases, "Danny Thomas Presents the Satin Strings" would be in both 8-track and 4-track formats would be in stores in a month's time. Releases on reel to reel would be available in the near future. On such example was "Danny Thomas Presents the Satin Strings", It's Easy to Remember on Itco Stereo Records L-98-2100.

== Television career ==
=== Make Room for Daddy (The Danny Thomas Show) ===
Thomas enjoyed a successful 11-year run (1953–1964) on Make Room for Daddy, later known as The Danny Thomas Show. Jean Hagen, Sherry Jackson, and Rusty Hamer were his first family. The Hagen character died offscreen in 1956 and was replaced by Marjorie Lord; Angela Cartwright also joined the cast at this time playing Danny's stepdaughter. Sherry Jackson left the series in 1958, and Penney Parker replaced her in the 1959–1960 season. Parker was written out of the series with her marriage to the character Patrick Hannigan, played by comedian Pat Harrington, Jr.

On January 1, 1959, Thomas appeared with his other Make Room for Daddy child stars, Angela Cartwright and Rusty Hamer, in an episode of NBC's The Ford Show, Starring Tennessee Ernie Ford.

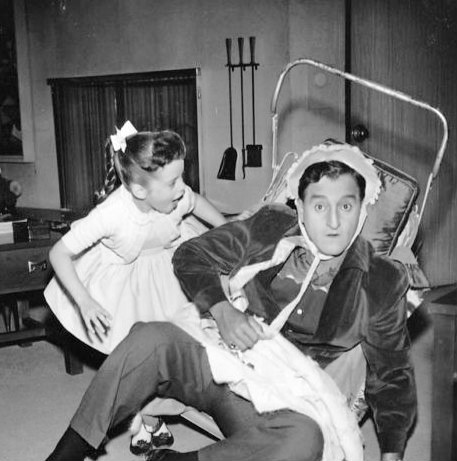
Danny plays house with television daughter Linda (Angela Cartwright)

The show was produced at Desilu Studios, where Lucille Ball was appearing alongside Desi Arnaz in I Love Lucy, and it featured several guest stars who went on to star in their own shows, including Andy Griffith (The Andy Griffith Show, Mayberry RFD), Joey Bishop, and Bill Bixby (My Favorite Martian and others). He also scored a major success at the London Palladium, in the years when many big American stars appeared there. In 1963, in an episode called "Oh, the Clancys," the Clancy Brothers and Tommy Makem appeared as Marjorie Lord's Irish cousins and sang "Brennan on the Moor."

In 1970, the program was revived for a season under the title Make Room for Granddaddy.

Angela Cartwright (who spoke about her on- and off-camera relationship with her television stepfather, Danny Thomas, on a groundbreaking ABC TV show, Make Room for Daddy) said: "I thought Danny was hilarious and he was always cracking me up. He was loud and gregarious, nothing like my real dad who is far more reserved than that. So, it was fun to be able to make smart remarks and get away with it. I would never have talked to my real parents that way, but in the make-believe world of the Williams family I got away with that." Cartwright also added that by the time Thomas' show had ended, she wanted to join the cast of The Sound of Music: "I went on an interview for the part of Brigitta. I was still filming The Danny Thomas Show, but I knew the series was coming to an end. After several auditions, I was the first von Trapp cast. I asked Danny Thomas if he would let me out of my contract so I could be in the movie and he was very gracious to let me out of the last show of the season. He didn't have to do that and I am very grateful he did."

=== The Wonderful World of Burlesque ===
In 1965 and 1966, Thomas presented The Wonderful World of Burlesque, featuring Lucille Ball, Jerry Lewis, Don Adams, Carol Channing, Andy Griffith, Sheldon Leonard, and Shirley Jones.

=== The Danny Thomas Hour ===
The Danny Thomas Hour was an American anthology television series that was broadcast on NBC during the 1967–1968 television season.

=== Producer ===
Thomas became a successful television producer (with Sheldon Leonard and Aaron Spelling among his partners) of The Dick Van Dyke Show, The Andy Griffith Show, That Girl, and The Mod Squad. Thomas also produced three series for Walter Brennan: The Real McCoys, The Tycoon, and The Guns of Will Sonnett on ABC during the late 1950s and 1960s. Thomas often appeared in cameos on shows he produced, including his portrayal of the tuxedoed, droll alien Kolak, from the planet Twilo, in the Dick Van Dyke Show science-fiction spoof, "It May Look Like a Walnut".

Thomas was responsible for Mary Tyler Moore's first "big break" in acting. In 1961, Carl Reiner cast her in The Dick Van Dyke Show after Thomas personally recommended Moore. Reiner had remembered her as "the girl with three names" whom he had turned down earlier, but rediscovered her after a lengthy search through photos and records.

=== Return to television ===
In the early 1970s, Thomas reunited most of his second Daddy cast (Marjorie Lord, Rusty Hamer, and Angela Cartwright) for a short-lived update of the show Make Room for Granddaddy. Premised around Danny and Kathy Williams caring for their grandson by daughter Terry, away with her husband who was serving in the military and stationed in Japan, the show lasted one season.

By the mid-1970s, Thomas' son Tony had become an accomplished television producer. Tony, along with Paul Junger Witt, formed Witt/Thomas Productions in 1975, and was responsible for his father's next three (and ultimately final) starring vehicles. Thomas returned to series TV in the NBC sitcom The Practice, airing from January 1976 to January 1977. Subsequently, he co-starred in I'm a Big Girl Now, which aired on ABC from 1980 to 1981.

Thomas was guest of honor in The Dean Martin Celebrity Roast that aired on December 15, 1976, on NBC. He guest-starred in "In Full Command" (S05 E22), the March 18, 1978, series finale of the long-running detective drama Kojak, as a corrupt superior officer in the police department, in an episode directed by series star Telly Savalas. He also appeared in the TV movie Side by Side (1988), opposite Milton Berle and Sid Caesar.

The last series in which Thomas was a headlining star was One Big Family, which aired in syndication during the 1986–1987 season. The situation comedy's premise was set around a semi-retired comedian whose nieces and nephews were orphaned after their parents were killed in a car accident.

=== Commercials ===
Thomas, like many actors prominent in television, endorsed commercial products, including Maxwell House coffee. According to Thomas, the money he earned from those commercials was used to establish St. Jude Children's Hospital.

== Philanthropy ==
As a "starving actor", Thomas had made a vow shortly before the birth of his first child: if he found success, he would build a shrine dedicated to St. Jude Thaddeus, a patron saint of hopeless causes.

In the early 1950s, after he became a successful actor, his wife joined him, and they began traveling the United States to help raise funds to build St. Jude Children's Research Hospital. He fervently believed: "No child should die in the dawn of life."

In 1962, with help from Dr. Lemuel Diggs and close friend Anthony Abraham, an auto magnate in Miami, Florida, Thomas founded the St. Jude Children's Research Hospital in Memphis, Tennessee. Since its inception, St. Jude has treated children from all 50 states and around the world, continuing the mission of finding cures and saving children.

== Personal life ==
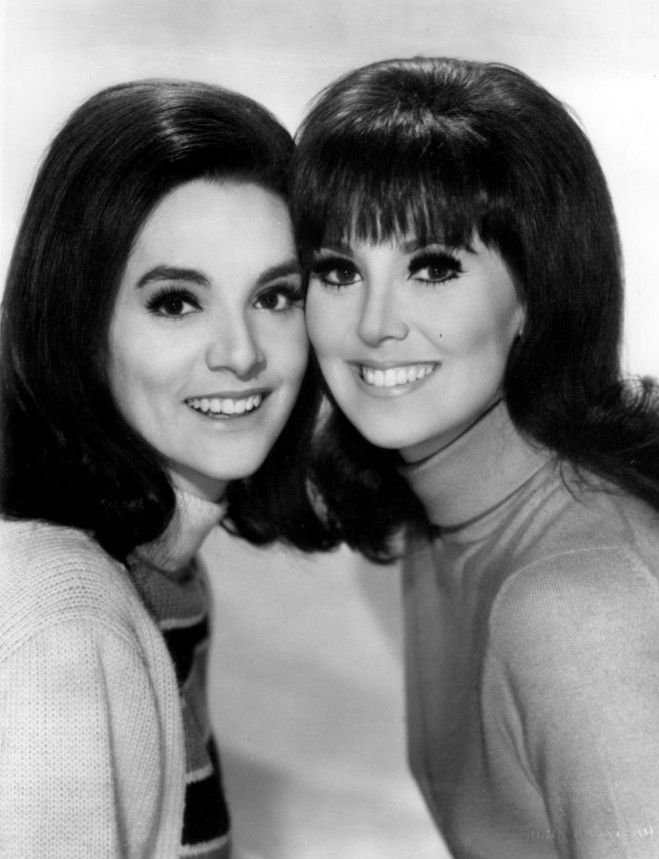
Terre and Marlo Thomas in 1969

Thomas married Rose Marie Cassaniti, a singer who worked under the name Rose Marie Mantel, on January 15, 1936, and had three children. The Thomas children followed their parents into entertainment in various capacities—Marlo as an actress and producer, Tony as a television producer, and Terre as an accomplished singer-songwriter.

Thomas was initiated to Freemasonry in Prudence Lodge No. 958, Chicago, passed, and raised to the sublime degree of Master Mason at Gothic Lodge No. 270 F&AM.

A Catholic, Thomas was named a Knight Commander of the Order of the Holy Sepulchre by Pope Paul VI in recognition of his services to the church and the community. He was a member of the Good Shepherd Parish and the Catholic Motion Picture Guild in Beverly Hills, California.

In 1983, President Ronald Reagan presented Thomas with a Congressional Gold Medal honoring him for his work with St. Jude Children's Research Hospital.

Thomas was one of the original owners of the Miami Dolphins, along with Joe Robbie, but he sold his share soon after the purchase. In addition, he also played golf regularly since his youth.

Two PGA Tour tournaments bore his name: the Danny Thomas-Diplomat Classic in south Florida in 1969 and, along with co-founder Vernon Bell, the Danny Thomas Memphis Classic from 1970 to 1984. He was also the first non-Jewish member of the Hillcrest Country Club in Los Angeles.

In 1990, Danny Thomas was inducted into the Television Hall of Fame.

== Death ==
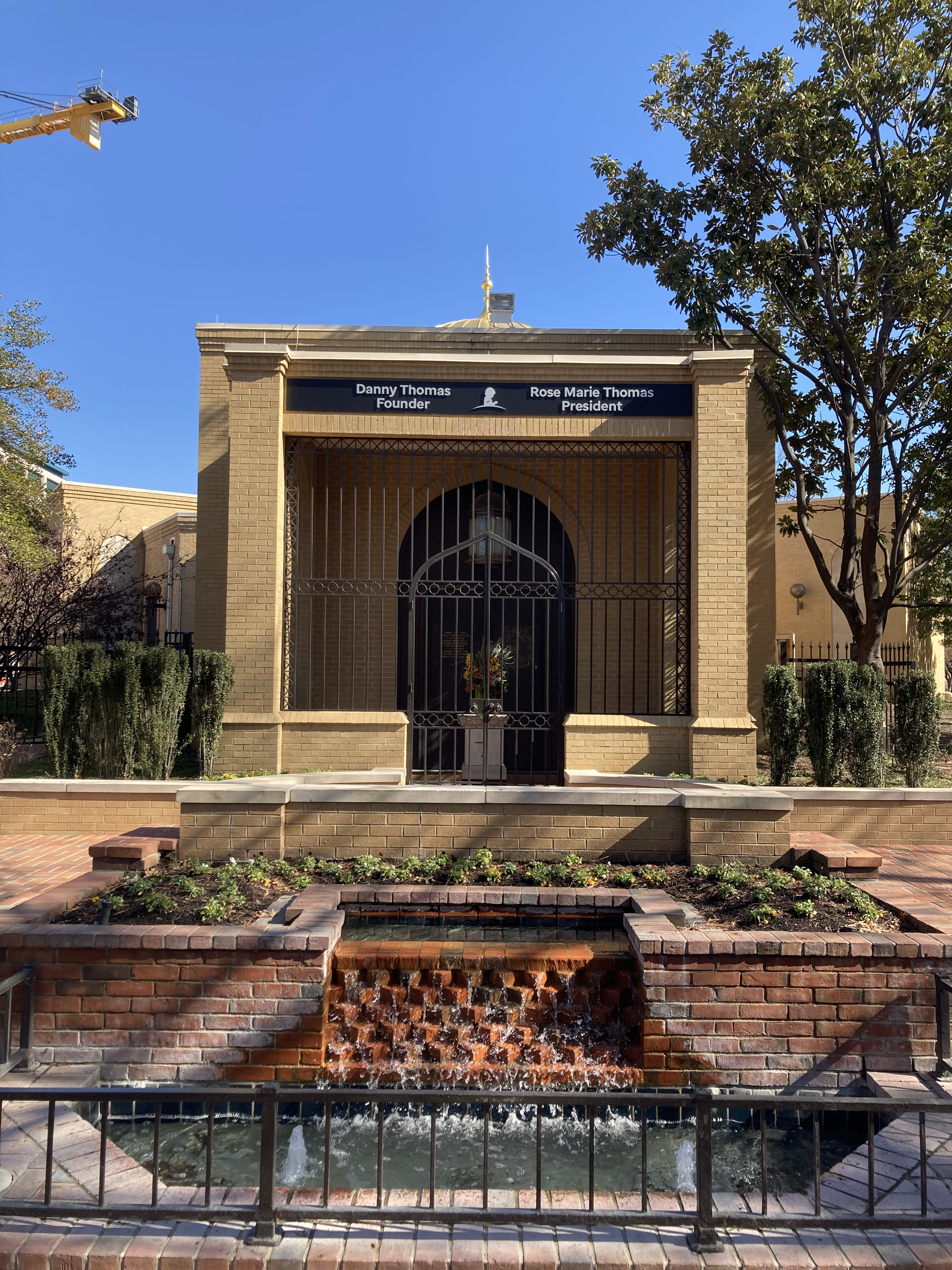
Mausoleum of Thomas and his wife, Rose Marie, at St Jude Hospital, Memphis

In the morning of February 6, 1991, Thomas had a heart attack at his home in Beverly Hills. Emergency personnel transported him to Cedars-Sinai Medical Center in Los Angeles where he died. He is interred in a mausoleum on the grounds of the St. Jude Children's Research Hospital in Memphis, Tennessee, alongside his wife.

== Awards and honors ==
A park in Toledo, Ohio, bears Thomas's name and a monument.

A stretch of roadway in Memphis is locally known as Danny Thomas Boulevard. The road, built in the 1960s to partially reroute U.S. Highway 51 around downtown, runs from E.H. Crump Boulevard (U.S. 70/79/64) to North Parkway/A.W. Willis Avenue (Tennessee State Route 1), passing through St. Jude Children's Research Hospital's campus on a viaduct.

For Thomas' contribution to the television industry, in February 1960 he was honored with a star on the Hollywood Walk of Fame located at 6901 Hollywood Boulevard.

Thomas was a posthumous recipient of the 2004 Bob Hope Humanitarian Award.

In 1965, Danny Thomas was appointed as a Special Deputy Sheriff by Ben Clark, who was a long-standing Riverside County Sheriff and a recognized "trail blazer" in terms of professionalizing the law enforcement profession in California and the United States.

On February 16, 2012, the United States Postal Service issued a first-class forever stamp honoring Thomas as an entertainer and humanitarian. The Danny Thomas Forever Stamp shows an oil-on-panel painting depicting a smiling, tuxedo-clad Thomas in the foreground and St. Jude Children's Research Hospital in the background.

== Filmography ==
Film
Year	Title	Role	Notes
1947	The Unfinished Dance	Mr. Paneros	
1948	Big City	Cantor David Irwin Feldman	
1951	Call Me Mister	Stanley	
1951	I'll See You in My Dreams	Gus Kahn	
1952	The Jazz Singer	Jerry Golding	
1964	Looking for Love	Himself	
1966	Don't Worry, We'll Think of a Title	Diner Customer	Uncredited
1967	Cricket on the Hearth	Himself, Caleb Plummer	Voice (Caleb Plummer)
1972	Journey Back to Oz	The Tin Man	Voice
1979	That's Life		
1988	Side by Side	Charlie Warren	

== See also ==
- List of Maronites
