= Larry Finley =

American radio and television pioneer

- Born: Lawrence Finkelstein; May 14, 1913; Syracuse, New York, U.S.
- Died: April 3, 2000 (aged 86); Long Island, New York, U.S.
- Occupation: Broadcast pioneer

Larry Finley (May 14, 1913 – April 3, 2000) was an American late-night broadcast pioneer, as well a leader in the audiotape (I.T.C.C. - International Tape Cartridge Corporation and NAL - North American Leisure Corporation) and videotape business and the founder of the Progressive Broadcasting System (PBS) radio network.

== Biography ==
Born and raised in Syracuse, New York, Finley became a nightclub manager in his hometown at age 18 before moving to Los Angeles, California in the 1930s and opening a chain of jewelry stores. In the 1940s, he became a business partner with musicians Tommy and Jimmy Dorsey in ownership of the Casino Gardens Ballroom in San Diego, where he also owned radio station KSDJ. He created his own TV production company, Finley Productions, Inc., the first such operation on the West Coast.

In 1945, Larry unsuccessfully filed a lawsuit against MCA Inc. for $3,000,000, claiming there was a conspiracy to restrain trade, and operating a monopoly.

Finley produced and hosted radio and TV shows in Los Angeles, including The Larry Finley Show, broadcast nightly from his restaurant on the Sunset Strip in Hollywood; as well as Strictly Informal, Dinner At Eight, and Music is My Beat, the first TV shows to be kinescoped and aired by the Armed Forces Television Network to troops in Korea.

It was towards the early 1950s that Finley launched PBS as an attempt at a fifth nationwide radio network. The network existed from November 26, 1950 until January 31, 1951.

In 1965, Finley founded & became President and CEO of the International Tape Cartridge Corporation (I.T.C.C.). He acquired the audio tape rights from 57 record labels and became the largest provider of music entertainment on pre-recorded tape. Then in late 1968 he formed NAL (North American Leisure Corp.) which also produced Music Tape Cartridges and Cassette Tapes and wanted to expand into other phases of the entertainment industry. In 1970, he founded the International Tape Association, which is now known as the International Recording Media Association (IRMA), at a time when audio tape products were still finding their market and he also helped standardize the various types of audiotapes.

Finley died April 2000, on Long Island, New York at age 86.

== Honors and awards ==
Among the honors he received during his lifetime were: The Los Angeles City of Hope's Annual Torch Bearer Award in 1955, Time-Life Magazine's Man of the Decade Award in 1980, induction into the Video Hall of Fame in 1984, and in 1998 he received the Lifetime Achievement Award of the Vision Fund of America.
