= (He's) The Great Imposter =

Single by The Fleetwoods
- B-side: "Poor Little Girl"
- Released: 1961 (US)
- Genre: Pop
- Length: 2:13
- Label: Dolton
- Songwriters: Sharon Sheeley and Jackie DeShannon

The Fleetwoods singles chronology
"Tragedy" (1961)	"(He's) The Great Imposter" (1961)	"Lovers by Night, Strangers by Day" (1962)

"(He's) The Great Imposter" is a 1961 song by The Fleetwoods. The song was written by Sharon Sheeley and Jackie DeShannon. It reached #30 on the Billboard Hot 100. One of the musicians on the song was session drummer Earl Palmer.

== Track listing ==
7" Vinyl

1. a. "(He's) The Great Imposter"
2. b. "Poor Little Girl"

== Chart performance ==
- US Pop Charts (#30)
- The song remained on the charts for eight weeks.
