= Troy Shondell =

American singer-songwriter (1939–2016)

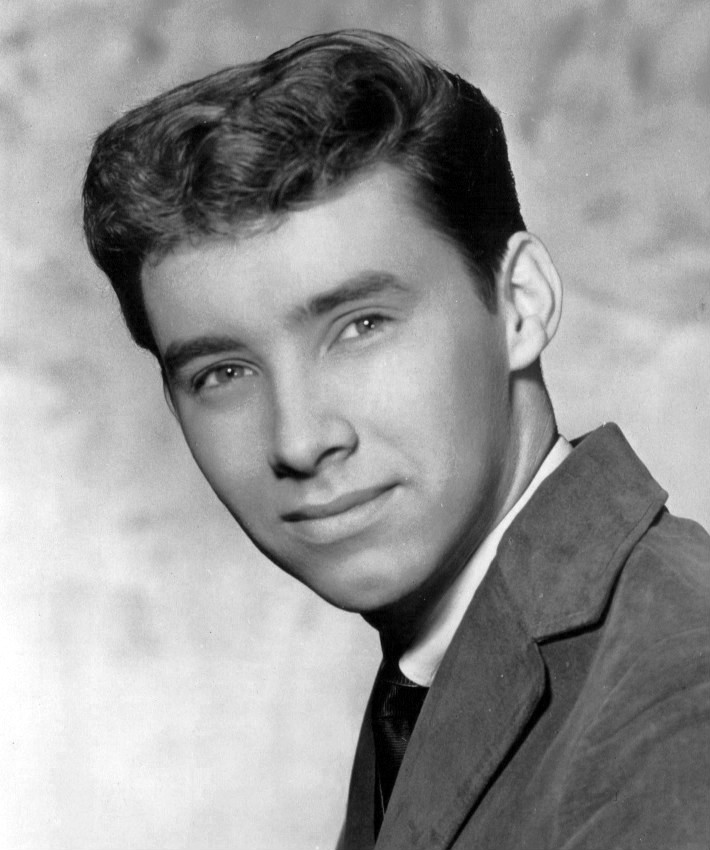
- Shondell in 1962

Background information
- Born: Gary Wayne Schelton; May 14, 1939; Fort Wayne, Indiana, U.S.
- Died: January 7, 2016 (aged 76) Picayune, Mississippi, U.S.
- Genres: Rock and roll
- Occupations: Singer, songwriter
- Instrument: Vocals
- Years active: 1957–2010s
- Labels: Liberty Records (US); London Records (UK)

Gary Wayne Schelton (May 14, 1939 – January 7, 2016), better known as Troy Shondell, was an American singer who achieved fame in the early 1960s. He became a transatlantic one-hit wonder, by releasing a single that made the record charts in both the US and the UK. The song, "This Time" (or sometimes billed as "This Time (We're Really Breaking Up)" ) sold over one million records, earning gold disc status. In a single year, sales were over three million copies.

== Biography ==
Shondell was born in 1939, raised in Fort Wayne, Indiana, and educated at Valparaiso and Indiana universities. He wrote his first song at age 14, which was recorded by Little Anthony & the Imperials. Shondell also learned to play five musical instruments. His professional music career started as a teenager. Mercury Records released his first single, "My Hero", from The Chocolate Soldier, which he recorded in 1958 under the name Gary Shelton, which was close to his real name, Gary Schelton.

He followed the next year with "Kissin' at the Drive-In", a rockabilly song that went on to become a drive-in theater standard. Still performing as Gary Shelton, he seemed to be on his way, at least in the Midwest. Chicago's Brass Rail, a major nightclub that usually hosted jazz and blues acts, brought him in for its first foray into rock and roll. The successful gig stretched to 16 weeks. In 1959, Mark Records released "The Trance" and "Goodbye Little Darlin'". These sold well in the Midwest and a few other areas, but neither made it into the Hot 100's Top 40. The singer cited his father as a major influence, among others. A song he wrote about his father's death in 1960 from a heart attack, "Still Loving You", became a country hit when it was recorded by Bob Luman. His father's demise caused his career to falter, and he briefly returned to help run the family business.

Around this time, he began using a new stage name, Troy Shondell, partly because of the popularity of actor Troy Donahue. In April 1961, he recorded "This Time", a song written by Chips Moman and first recorded by Thomas Wayne. The record was released during the last week of June on the tiny Gaye label and picked up by the small Los Angeles Goldcrest label, selling ten thousand copies during the first week. Six weeks after being released and played in Chicago, Shondell flew to Los Angeles and signed with Liberty Records. "This Time" finally hit the Billboard charts the third week of September and landed in the Top 10 five weeks later at its number six peak, and it stayed in the charts for a total of thirteen weeks. The track reached no. 22 in the UK Singles Chart at the end of that year. The song was covered by Shakin' Stevens on the 1981 Epic album Shaky.

"Tears From An Angel" was his follow-up recording. It was released in December 1961, debuting on the Billboard Hot 100 at #96 on the week ending December 31, 1961 and it would peak at #77 on the Billboard Hot 100 on the week ending February 3, 1962. No further chart action was forthcoming, and Shondell quietly slipped away from the music industry the following year, despite his third single "Na-Ne-No", being produced by Phil Spector. However, in 1963, Tommy Jackson changed the name of his high school band from "Tom and the Tornados" to "The Shondells" in honor of Shondell (one of his musical idols). Jackson became "Tommy James" and international fame followed for the act. Chicago band The Ides of March originally named themselves the Shon-dells, also in tribute to Troy. Shortly before their debut single, "You Wouldn't Listen", was released, the label found out that James had been using the name first, so they were forced to change it. In 1968, Shondell became a songwriter for Acuff-Rose Music in Nashville, Tennessee, and the first recording artist for TRX Records, a branch of Hickory Records, for whom Shondell recorded some gramophone record discs until 1969. It was reported in the 6 September 1969 issue of Record World that Shodell had converted to country music and his first release with the new Itco (International Tape Cartridge Corp.) was a single with two songs he had written. The single, "And We Made Love" / "Imitation Woman" was released on Itco Stereo Records SS 105 that year. The recording was made at Nashville's Woodland Studio. He went into the music publishing field. In October 1969, Shondell was appointed as Assistant Regional Director for ASCAP's Southern Regional Office in Nashville.

In 2001, Shondell still performed at shows and other events. Along with Jimmy Clanton, Ronnie Dove, and Ray Peterson, Shondell was a member of the Masters of Rock 'n' Roll. On October 2, 2007, Shondell traveled to Collins, Mississippi, to deliver a musical tribute to his fallen rock and roll colleague Dale Houston, who, with musical partner Grace Broussard, had reached no. 1 in 1963 with "I'm Leaving It Up to You" as the musical duo Dale & Grace. Shondell died from complications of Alzheimer's and Parkinson's disease on January 7, 2016.

== See also ==
- List of people from Fort Wayne, Indiana
- List of 1960s one-hit wonders in the United States
- Tommy James and The Shondells
