= Progressive Broadcasting System =

American radio network (1950–1951)

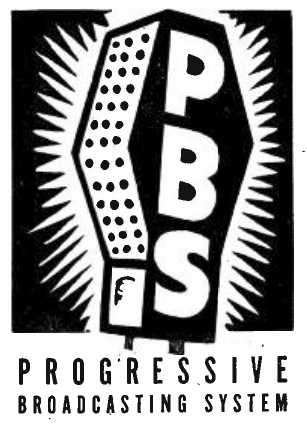
PBS network logo.

The Progressive Broadcasting System (commonly referred to as PBS; sometimes known as Progressive) was an American commercial radio network of 1950-51 founded by Los Angeles entrepreneur and transcribed program producer Larry Finley. "Catering to smaller radio stations," the company had hoped to affiliate with around 1,000 radio stations in the United States which did not already have affiliation agreements with the top four national radio networks of the era: NBC, CBS, ABC, & Mutual, or even somewhat smaller national networks, like the Keystone Broadcasting System (KBS) or Liberty.

The Evening Review, a newspaper from East Liverpool, Ohio announced the company's formation on November 20th, 1950. Broadcasts began November 26, 1950. Two hundred stations were needed for the network to break even. However, only "about 100 stations" joined, and the network folded at the end of its schedule on January 31, 1951.

And, before it ceased operations, PBS was recognized by some as an attempt at a fifth major radio network after Mutual alongside Liberty.

== Organization ==
After "nearly two years of planning and organization", PBS had capitalization of $1,500,000 and was incorporated in California.

Executives of the network included Miller McClintock, chairman and chief executive; Larry Finley, president; Donald Withycomb, executive vice president; Edgar H. Twalmley, vice president in charge of the eastern division; Robert B. White, vice president in charge of the central division; B.B. Robinson, vice president in charge of finance; Kolin Hagar, eastern district manager; and Nat Linden, chief of production.

== Operation ==
PBS planned to offer programming for 10 hours of the day on as many as 350 radio stations. At a press conference August 10, 1950, network President Larry Finley told reporters, "Advertising will be local, except for the night programs, and there will be no network option time." The network's flagship station was KGFJ in Hollywood.

=== Programming ===
Billing its offerings as "The world's greatest daytime network radio programming", PBS made programming ("aimed primarily at the housewife") available to affiliates from 7 a.m. to 7 p.m. daily. Programs offered were much like those of other networks, "including an array of soap operas, quiz shows, children's features, variety shows and audience participation programs".

Following is the program lineup with which PBS launched its operation.

Program	Star	Length	Days
Grand Motel (soap opera)	Marc Lawrence	15 minutes	Monday - Friday
This Is Mine (soap opera)	Barbara Britton	15 minutes	Monday - Friday
Betty Carr, Detective (soap opera)	Hope Emerson	15 minutes	Monday - Friday
Cindy (soap opera)	Jeanne Cagney	15 minutes	Monday - Friday
Taylored Lady (fashion news)	Estelle Taylor	30 minutes	Monday - Friday
Mary Grove At Home (home economics)	Mary Grove	15 minutes	Monday - Friday
My Secret Desire (audience participation)	Ann Dvorak	30 minutes	Monday - Friday
Mel Tormé Time (music)	Mel Tormé	30 minutes	Monday - Friday
Our Best to You	Tom Hanlon	30 minutes	Monday - Friday
Hart of Hollywood (studio tours)	Maurice Hart	30 minutes	Monday - Friday
Great American Quiz	Hal Sawyer	30 minutes	Monday - Friday
Bar None Ranch	Cottonseed Clark	30 minutes	Monday - Friday
Movietown News	Charlotte Rogers	15 minutes	Monday - Friday
Uncle Remus (children's stories)	Jimmy Scribner	15 minutes	Monday - Friday
World of Sports	Lou Nova	15 minutes	Monday - Friday
Young Ideas	Harry Von Zell	30 minutes	Saturday
The Old Skipper	Captain Hix	15 minutes	Saturday
Club Time	Bob McLaughlin	3 hours	Saturday
Mindy Carson Show	Mindy Carson	15 minutes	Saturday
Vic Damone Show	Vic Damone	30 minutes	Saturday
Hugh Said It	Hugh Herbert	30 minutes	Sunday
Progressive Music	Stan Kenton	30 minutes	Sunday
Connie Haines Entertains	Connie Haines	1 hour	Sunday
Mel Torme Time (Sunday Version)	Mel Tormé	1 hour	Sunday
Frankie Laine Show	Frankie Laine	2 hours	Sunday
Page Pages You	Page Cavanaugh	30 minutes	Sunday

On December 15, 1950, President Harry S. Truman proclaimed "the existence of a state of national emergency". Afterward, PBS officials sent a letter to approximately 60 agencies and departments of the federal government saying that "its program lines [would be] kept open until 11 p.m. and offering those evening hours to the government for any messages or programs which PBS can take to its member stations in support of defense and emergency activities."
