= Edwin C. Metcalfe =

American saxophonist and TV station manager

Edwin C. Metcalfe was a saxophonist and manager of WPTA, who lived in Roanoke, Indiana.

Prior to entering the television broadcasting business, Metcalfe was a professional musician. In the 1940s, Metcalfe sang and played woodwinds with the legendary Spike Jones band.

Upon his 1974 arrival in Fort Wayne, Metcalfe brought showmanship and sparkle to a tired WPTA news operation, and that, combined with a generous budget, catapulted the station from third place behind the older WANE-TV and WKJG-TV stations, to first place for local news in the Fort Wayne, Indiana market.

Metcalfe attended the University of Pittsburgh and was awarded an honorary doctorate by Indiana Tech.

His wife of more than 50 years, Margaret Tootie Metcalfe, died in December 2000. They had two children, Judith Metcalfe Hampton and R. Duane Metcalfe. Metcalfe is retired and lives in Arizona.
