= International Tape Cartridge Corporation =

- Founded: 1965
- Founder: Larry Finley
- Status: defunct
- Genre: various
- Country of origin: United States
- Location: 663-5th Ave., New York 10022, United States

The International Tape Cartridge Corporation (I.T.C.C.) was an organization that was founded by Larry Finley in 1965. Most of their product was releases in 4-track and 8-track cartridge formats.

== Background ==
The International Tape Cartridge Corporation was formed by Larry Finley in 1965 for the purpose of licensing record label product for duplication of cartridges and distribution.

As of mid-1968, 58% of the company was owned by Dextra Corp.

One of the label's subsidiaries was Itco Stereo Records that was formed in 1969. The vice-president in charge of the label was James Tyrell.

The company was located at 663-5th Ave., New York 10022.

== History ==
By 1966, the organization had about 1,500 selections on 4-track and 8-track formats in its catalogue from about 50 labels.

In May 1968 James J. Elkins joined International Tape Cartridge Corporation as the executive vice-president. He also became the vice-president of Dextra Corp.

It was reported in the 31 May 1969 issue of Billboard that International Tape Cartridge Corp. vice president Paul Adams said that a budget line of cartridges, Pallisade cartridges would be presented on 1 July at a national sales meeting in Nashville. A range of soul and country music would be among the twenty-five cartridges. Also in the summer, the corporation would be engaging in a big promotion for Little Darlin' Records which would involve the LP record, 8-track cartridge, cassette, and reel-to-reel formats.

It was reported in the 27 July 1968 issue of Billboard that Larry Finley had resigned from his role at International Tape Cartridge Corporation and formed a new company, North American Leisure Corporation. Due to Finley's resignation, James J. Elkins had been promoted to the position of president of the organization.

== Subsidiaries ==
=== Itco Stereo Records ===
It was reported in the 28 October 1967 issue of Billboard that Danny Thomas was on the International Tape Cartridge Corporation roster. A series of releases had begun with six cartridges of lush orchestral music that he was to select. According to ITCC president Larry Finley, the series "Danny Thomas Presents the Satin Strings" would be in both 8-track and 4-track formats would be in stores in a month's time. Releases on reel to reel would be available in the near future. On such example was "Danny Thomas Presents the Satin Strings", It's Easy to Remember on Itco Stereo Records L-98-2100.

It was reported in the 26 July 1969 issue of Record World that Itco was off to a very good start with the release of the Hair album by Aquarian Age which was like the cast performance. In about a week, a song from the album, "'Easy to Be Hard" was to be released as a single. A girl who performed a solo on the track was noticed by the show's composer Galt MacDermot who "flipped" as a result. According to label vice-president Jimmy Tyrell, they were trying to get her signed. They had a single out by the Brass Ring, "Theme from Last Summer" from the film Last Summer. An album by the group containing the song was to be released on 15 August. According to Tyrell, they were in the pop or "good music" bag and trying to get on the racks what would appeal to impulse buying.

It was announced in the 13 September 1969 issue of Cash Box that the new ITCC subsidiary had signed Eddie Fisher to their roster.

Keanya Collins recorded her version of Lesley Gore's "You Don't Own Me". Backed with "As Much Yours as He Is Mine", it was released on Itco 103. It was given a good review in the 13 September 1969 issue of Cash Box. It made the Billboard Soul chart, peaking at No. 42. Also in 1969, Aurora Borealis, a 9-piece musical ensemble worked with producers Robert Martin and John Driscoll and recorded the single, "Smiles and Kisses" / "You", which was released on Itco Stereo Records SS 107 in 1969.
