= Thomas Wayne (singer) =

American singer (1940–1971)

- Born: July 22, 1940; Batesville, Mississippi, U.S.
- Died: August 15, 1971 (aged 31) Memphis, Tennessee, U.S.
- Genres: Rockabilly, rock and roll, R&B, pop
- Years active: 1958–1964
- Labels: Fernwood, Mercury; Phillips International

Thomas Wayne Perkins (July 22, 1940 – August 15, 1971) was an American singer. He is best remembered as a one-hit wonder for "Tragedy".

== Career ==
Wayne was the brother of Johnny Cash's guitarist, Luther Perkins. He released several singles between 1958 and 1964, primarily on the labels Fernwood and Mercury, including "This Time", which would later become a hit for Troy Shondell. He scored a major U.S. hit with the song “Tragedy" (credited to Thomas Wayne with the DeLons), which peaked at No. 20 on the R&B Singles chart and No. 5 on the Billboard Hot 100 in 1959. It sold over one million copies, earning gold disc status.

The song proved to be his only hit, however. Later, Wayne worked as a sound engineer, before he died in a car accident, at the age of 31, in Memphis in 1971.
