= Robert Thieme =

American Christian clergyman

- Born: Robert Bunger Thieme Jr. April 1, 1918; Fort Wayne, Indiana, U.S.
- Died: August 16, 2009 (aged 91); Houston, Texas, U.S.
- Occupations: Theologian, author
- Spouse: Betty Beal
- Children: Robert "Bobby" Thieme III

Robert Bunger Thieme Jr. (April 1, 1918 – August 16, 2009) was pastor of Berachah Church, a nondenominational Christian church in Houston, Texas, from 1950 to 2003. Affectionately called "the Colonel" by his congregation, he was a dispensationalist theologian who wrote over a hundred books and conducted over 10,000 sermons on various theological topics during his 55 years as a pastor.

== Biography ==
Thieme was born in Fort Wayne, Indiana, to Anna (Cloakey) and Robert Bunger Thieme. He was raised in Beverly Hills, California and attended Beverly Hills High School which included four years of Latin studies. Thieme's undergraduate work was at the University of Arizona at Tucson where he majored in Greek, and was elected to Phi Beta Kappa after graduating with honors in 1940. While attending university he met and married Betty Beal, the daughter of a Baptist minister.

Thieme's seminary studies at Dallas Theological Seminary (DTS) were interrupted by World War II service. During World War II he was in charge of training all Army Air Corps cadets at Luke Field, and rose to the rank of lieutenant colonel in the Army Air Corps. After World War II, Thieme resumed his theological studies at DTS, where he graduated magna cum laude. His 1949 master's thesis was entitled Armageddon: An Investigation of the Campaign of the Great Day of God the Almighty. During his time at DTS Thieme held a part-time pastorate at Reinhardt Bible Church in Dallas, Texas.

Thieme became pastor of Berachah Church in Houston, Texas, in 1950, interrupting his doctoral work at DTS after Dr. J. Ellwood Evans recommended him to the church. He was pastor at Berachah Church until he retired in 2003 due to Alzheimer's disease. Thieme dedicated his life to intensive study of the Scripture and teaching his congregation. Gifted in intellect and indefatigable in production, Thieme held Bible classes most nights of the week and twice on Sundays. Requiring strict academic discipline from his congregation as well, he earned the genuine respect of those in regular attendance. Those close to him knew him as humble and gentlemanly. Over the years Thieme spoke at numerous Bible conferences and ordained many men into the ministry. His recorded Bible classes and books are available free of charge.

After Thieme retired in 2003, his only son, Robert "Bobby" Thieme III, was elected by the congregation of Berachah Church to serve as the new pastor. Around this time R. B. Thieme, Jr., Bible Ministries began reformatting and revising existing material into modern formats (e.g. DVD and MP3).

== Theology ==
Thieme attended Dallas Theological Seminary and was influenced by its founder, Dr. Lewis Sperry Chafer. He can be described as a dispensationalist, non-denominational Christian who believed in Biblical inerrancy.

=== ICE ===
Thieme's doctrinal study and unique vocabulary were based on a methodology he called "ICE": Isagogics, Categories, and Exegesis. Isagogics is the study of the Bible in its historical context, including the human writer, the recipients, and the time in which they lived. Categories refers to a topical compilation of doctrine, so that one can approach the Bible on a line-by-line-precept-by-precept basis, and cross-reference Scripture effectively. Exegesis, as defined by Thieme, involves studying the grammar, syntax, and etymology of the original languages of Scripture, so that one is not relying on intermediate translations which may obscure or lose meanings. Through the ICE method, Thieme sought to accurately communicate the truths of the Bible.

=== Doctrinal emphasis ===
Thieme built his ministry on the assertion that believers in Jesus Christ must learn the Word of God to know the will of God for their lives and to execute the plan of God for their lives. He defined Bible doctrine as the content of the Canon of Scripture, with emphasis on the communication of that content by teaching and instruction. Thieme covered most of the Bible with his congregation, verse by verse from the original languages using the aforementioned ICE methodology. He began every class by citing Hebrews 4:12, "The Word of God is alive and powerful, sharper than any two-edged sword ..." and 2 Timothy 3:16, "All Scripture is God-breathed, and is profitable for doctrine, for reproof, for correction, for instruction in righteousness, that the man of God might be mature, thoroughly furnished unto every good work."

Thieme would then cite his responsibility under 2 Timothy 2:15, "Study to show thyself approved unto God, a workman that needeth not to be ashamed, rightly dividing the Word of Truth." Under this mandate, he emphasized doctrinal teaching on salvation and the post-salvation spiritual life of the believer in Jesus Christ.

==== Salvation through faith alone in Christ alone ====
Thieme taught the biblical definition of faith as a non-meritorious system of perception wherein the merit lies with the object of faith, Jesus Christ. The status of the subject is irrelevant, as one need only express positive volition toward Jesus Christ to receive eternal salvation. God the Father imputed all the sins of the human race, past, present and future, to Christ on the cross and judged them, thus completing the work of salvation. Therefore, salvation is available to anyone who believes in Christ. Thieme said an individual has the option of expressing positive volition privately, forming the sentences in thought, telling God the Father he is trusting in Christ for salvation. Nothing more is required.

Thieme believed contemporary Christianity has superimposed a number of false actions on the Gospel message. Consequently, at least every Sunday, he would emphasize what did not need to be done for salvation:

- Invite Christ into your heart
- Feel sorry for, or repent from personal sins
- Walk down an aisle
- Be baptized with water
- Join a church
- Give money to a church
- Give up something you enjoy

Thieme held that these actions, while some of them might be commendable from the human viewpoint, are an intrusion on faith. Faith is the absence of merit, and no human good of any form is acceptable to God for salvation. God extends the invitation to salvation, not the other way around. The Greek verb metanoeo, translated "repent" in the Bible, when used in connection with salvation, means to change one's mind about Christ and believe in him at the point of Gospel hearing. At that point, the grace of God does everything necessary to make faith effectual for salvation. The only personal sin that results in eternal condemnation is to die without having personally believed in Jesus Christ as Savior. God solved the sin problem, and made an issue of individual volition. God knows the thoughts of every individual, and is not constrained by geographical isolation or linguistic barrier in his dissemination of the salvation message to those who desire a relationship with him. Water baptism and legitimate church activities are post-salvation functions of the believer, not prerequisites for salvation.

Thieme categorized the Christian's life into three phases: the moment of salvation, the post-salvation life of the believer on Earth, and the believer in eternity. These distinctions allow the proper interpretation of verses pertaining to salvation (e.g. Acts 16:31, Eph. 2:8-9, Gen. 15:6), and verses pertaining to the post-salvation function of the believer (e.g. Jas. 2:17), so as not to obscure the simplicity of faith alone in Christ alone for salvation.

==== Spiritual growth ====
Thieme taught that believers in Jesus Christ grow spiritually from the daily intake of Bible doctrine communicated by their right pastor. He emphasized that no pastor is right for everyone, but that once a believer identifies a qualified, prepared pastor that is right for him, the believer must orient to the authority of that pastor, and consistently assimilate accurate doctrinal teaching from that pastor in order to grow spiritually. Thieme maintained that perception and application of Bible doctrine is the means by which believers fulfill their responsibility to God of growing in grace to spiritual maturity, and that without it believers will retrogress in their spiritual lives.

==== Mechanics for the spiritual life ====
Having established the perception and application of Bible doctrine as the basis for spiritual growth, Thieme focused much of his ministry on teaching the protocol and mechanics for the spiritual life of the believer in Jesus Christ. Thieme's objective was to delineate, from the Scripture, God's plan for the Church-Age believer, and the numerous grace assets God provided in eternity past for believers to fulfill his plan. God provides equal privilege and equal opportunity for all believers in Jesus Christ to execute his plan and receive his highest and best for them. Thieme compiled a list of forty benefits from the Scripture that God gives to every Church-Age believer at the moment of salvation. Among these is the power system God designed for the execution of his plan.

Thieme identified the scriptural mandates and objectives of the spiritual life as belonging to a single system of power and love. This power system was designed by God for Church-Age believers to become winners in human history. The system, or dynasphere, unifies God's grace provisions and mandates for believers, enabling them to keep his mandates, grow spiritually, and share the inner strength, virtue, and happiness of Jesus Christ. It is the same system used by the humanity of Christ to fulfill his mission during the First Advent. After his resurrection, ascension and session, Jesus Christ provided the operational system to his royal family on earth for them to glorify him.

Through use of the rebound technique, the spiritual recovery procedure of 1 John 1:9, the believer is restored to fellowship with God, becomes filled with the Holy Spirit, and enters into the divine system. Inside the system, the believer learns Bible doctrine and orients to the grace and doctrinal thinking of Jesus Christ. Bible doctrine in the soul of the believer and the filling of the Holy Spirit are the power options for the spiritual life. They underscore the importance of consistent exposure to expository Bible teaching throughout the believer's life on Earth, under the principle that "man shall not live on bread alone, but on every word that proceeds out of the mouth of God" (Matt. 4:4). As the believer grows from metabolized Bible doctrine, and combines his perception of doctrine with the application of doctrine through the problem-solving devices of God's system, his spiritual growth accelerates. The growing believer advances to spiritual adulthood where he shares the motivational and functional virtues of Jesus Christ, acquires the spiritual skills necessary for advanced problem solving, and becomes productive in Christian service. As the spiritual adult continues his advance to spiritual maturity, and applies the problem-solving devices in undeserved suffering, he glorifies God to the maximum and fulfills his destiny in Christ. For growing and mature believers, God works all things together for divine good.

In his book Christian Integrity, Thieme covers the divine system in great detail, with its priority, purpose, policy, objectives, and authority. In the Scripture the system is also referred to as the sphere of love (John 15:9-10), since it emphasizes love as the supreme virtue of the Christian life. The virtue love of the Christian life includes reciprocal love for God and impersonal love for all mankind. As the believer advances within God's system and develops capacity for love and happiness, God is free to impute maximum blessings to him. To this end, Thieme created numerous teaching aids and contemporary metaphors for communicating the mechanics of the spiritual life.

==== Supergrace and spiritual maturity ====
Thieme coined the term "supergrace" from James 4:6 (Gk. meizona charin), which says "he [God] gives greater grace." Thieme used supergrace as a synonym for spiritual maturity, with emphasis on the special blessings above and beyond salvation that God conveys to each believer who attains spiritual maturity. God is glorified when he is able to provide special blessings to the believer who has made the maturity adjustment to the justice of God in time. Supergrace is God's objective for the believer in time, and is the means of glorifying God in the Angelic Conflict.

Thieme considered it his job as a pastor-teacher to study and teach Bible doctrine daily in order for positive believers to grow to spiritual maturity and receive their supergrace blessings. He identified biblical passages where God is said to be waiting to provide these blessings to believers. In one such passage in Ephesians 1:3, Thieme concluded that supergrace blessings were placed on deposit for every believer before the creation of mankind, but are conveyed to the believer only at spiritual maturity. Though no believer can ever lose salvation, the believer who fails to advance to spiritual maturity forfeits his supergrace blessings, and receives discipline from God in time. What is lacking in the immature or reversionistic believer is capacity of soul, and that capacity is acquired only through persistent spiritual growth and exercise of the mechanics for the spiritual life.

Since supergrace blessings are unique to each believer, Thieme outlined them categorically as follows:

- Spiritual blessings - capacity of soul, love for God, occupation with Jesus Christ, sharing the happiness of God.
- Temporal blessings - wealth, promotion, success, social prosperity, sexual prosperity, technical prosperity, leadership dynamics.
- Blessings by association - friends and loved ones are blessed through their association with the mature believer.
- Historical impact - mature believer becomes the basis for blessing in his geographical periphery (i.e., salt of the Earth).
- Dying blessings - sting of death removed, great tranquility of soul in dying, anticipation of greater rewards for all eternity.

In addition to the above categories of blessings, Thieme explained from Romans 5, Philippians 3, Hebrews 11, and Revelation 2-3 that supergrace believers receive even greater blessings in eternity. Thieme called these rewards surpassing grace based on Ephesians 2:7. Surpassing grace rewards serve as an eternal memorial to God's grace.

==== Reversionism and national degeneration ====
Thieme's Doctrine of Reversionism detailed the consequences of the believer's neglect of the spiritual life God provides. Thieme outlined eight stages of spiritual degeneration in which a negative believer makes self-destructive decisions that reverse his spiritual growth. Through any number of distractions, or reaction to some person or circumstance, a believer at any stage of spiritual growth may neglect or reject Bible doctrine and enter into a frantic search for happiness to fill the resulting void. True happiness for the believer only comes from God's Word and the spiritual life he provided at salvation (Jer. 15:16). As self-directed efforts to obtain happiness prove futile, the frustrated believer develops aberrations in his emotional pattern and his attitude toward Bible doctrine becomes increasingly negative. During the early stages of reversionism God administers warning discipline to the believer to motivate spiritual recovery. If negative volition to Bible doctrine remains unchecked by spiritual recovery, the believer accepts human-viewpoint substitutes for Bible doctrine, and enters into the advanced stages of reversionism. As the darkness of human viewpoint is drawn into the soul, the reversionistic believer accumulates scar tissue of the soul (i.e., hardness of heart), and becomes characterized by perpetual mental attitude sins, unhappiness, emotional instability, and sometimes mental illness. God desires the believer to recover from spiritual degeneracy and have a virtuous, happy, fulfilled life, but the believer in the advanced stages of reversionism has ignored warning discipline from God, has repeatedly failed to avail himself of his spiritual assets to recover, and is liable for intensive discipline from God. When a maximum number of believers are in reversionism, there is an adverse impact on the nation in which they reside.

Thieme asserted that "as goes the believer, so goes the nation." He emphasized that while there is no such thing as a Christian nation, God blesses or curses a nation based on the attitude of its believers toward Bible doctrine. Just as individual believers in reversionism are liable for divine discipline, so a nation with a maximum number of reversionistic believers is liable for national discipline from God. Thieme enumerated five cycles of national discipline from Leviticus 26 that God administers to the spiritually degenerate nation. The cycles of discipline begin with a loss of individual freedom and economic recession, and if unchecked by the spiritual recovery of enough believers, they continue with the breakdown of law and order, military defeat, and culminate in the destruction of the nation. Thieme developed this extensively in his Doctrine of Historical Trends. Though his scriptural references were many, he frequently referenced Hosea 4:6. Thieme believed the United States is currently in the cycles of discipline. He referenced 2 Chronicles 7:14 as the means of national recovery.

==== Doctrine of love ====
Thieme taught that divine love was expressed to the human race unconditionally at the Cross, and therefore the response must be a non-meritorious one—faith alone in Christ alone. Thieme wrote an entire book on the love of God, and an overview may be found on pages 14–19 of "The Unfailing Love of God." In his book, Thieme distinguished between divine love, human love, and the virtuous love mandated by the Scripture for the believer in Jesus Christ. Through careful grammatical and categorical development, Thieme explained how the powerful virtue-love provided for the spiritual life of the believer is patterned after divine love. Lastly, Thieme addressed the anthropopathism of love. Only scriptural passages where human characteristics God does not possess are ascribed to God (e.g. Rom. 9:13) were considered anthropopathisms, or language of accommodation to convey the policy of divine justice toward unbelieving humanity.

=== Criticism ===
Thieme's teachings have been the topic of criticism from individuals such as Stewart Custer, Robert Walter, Joe Wall, George King, D. Koopmans, R. L. Hymers Jr and John R. Rice.

==== Theological controversy ====
Robert Thieme argued that the "blood of Christ" as mentioned in the Bible is a representative analogy for his substitutionary spiritual death, arguing that neither the literal blood of Christ or his physical death had penal substitutionary value in the atonement. Because this position was not held by some faculty members of Dallas Theological Seminary it caused a local controversy. John Walvoord said to him that Christ had to shed his blood to fulfill scriptures such as 1 Peter 1:18-19 and Hebrews 9:22. Robert G. Walter went somewhat farther than Walvoord, arguing that Thieme was outside Christian orthodoxy. This view has particularly gained strong opposition among Independent Baptists.

Thieme referenced Kittel's Theological Dictionary, Vol. I, pages 172–179, where "the blood of Christ" is described as "a pregnant verbal symbol for the saving work of Christ;" and A. T. Robertson's Grammar of the Greek New Testament, pages 134–135, where Robertson stresses a metaphorical usage pointing to violent, sacrificial death. Thieme emphasized that so excruciating was the pain of substitutionary spiritual death, Christ screamed out when he was judged for the sins of the world on the Cross. Christ did not bleed to death on the Cross, as most of his blood was in his body after his physical death when John observed a Roman soldier thrust a spear into his chest. Thieme also cited German linguistic scholars Arndt and Gingrich as among the first to have a breakthru on the meaning of "haima", documented on page 22 of their Greek lexicon. In sum, Thieme's view was that in the Old Testament ritual sacrifices, the animal blood was literal and the judgement was figurative, while in the New Testament, "the blood of Christ" is figurative and the divine judgement is literal.

D. Koopmans (Th.D) asserts Thieme's teachings are well within the bounds of scriptural orthodoxy. With respect to "the blood of Christ," Koopmans concludes "Walvoord's views are essentially the same as Thieme's" on page 56 of his doctoral dissertation, where he devotes an entire chapter to the subject. Koopmans further states in conclusion: "the superficial accusations against Thieme are based on a failure to comprehend Thieme's total theological frame of reference."

Robert Thieme's doctrine of the soul has drawn significant controversy. He taught that soul life is imparted only at birth—a view some have interpreted as implicitly allowing for abortion. Although Thieme never explicitly supported abortion, he also refrained from publicly opposing it, a stance that has attracted criticism from some Christians. Thieme wrote a book on the origin of human life wherein he meticulously documented the scriptural, grammatical, and theological bases for his teaching. He cautioned against becoming emotional about an issue he considered to be a distraction to the spiritual life of the believer.

Also contentious for some was Thieme's teaching on the "right pastor." Thieme asserted that most believers have a single pastor to whom they should listen exclusively for optimal spiritual growth. While some critics believe this meant congregants were expected to accept their pastor's teaching without question, Thieme taught that his job was only to communicate, and that it was up the individual to accept or reject what was taught, and to find another church if they didn't like the teaching. Joe Wall has rejected this doctrine as fostering an unhealthy, authoritarian church culture.

== Ministry ==
Thieme's ministry was primarily for believers in Jesus Christ who attended regularly, since classes typically involved verse-by-verse analysis, building upon previous lessons. Thieme would continue with the current series through Sundays and holidays, excepting New Year's Eve when he held a military communion service and gave a special message related to the upcoming year. The objective of his ministry was to lead positive believers to spiritual maturity. He had little interest in believers who were inconsistent or attended for some reason other than the teaching.

Thieme's style of teaching and vocabulary reflected his military background. He would frequently acknowledge members of the U.S. Armed Forces in attendance, expressing gratitude for the tremendous sacrifices made to preserve the freedom of assembly enjoyed at Berachah Church. Thieme wrote a number of books which focused on the Christian's military responsibilities, such as War: Moral or Immoral, and Freedom through Military Victory. Thieme also likened the Christian spiritual life to military service, using military metaphors in his books Follow the Colors, Christian, at Ease!, and The Christian Warrior. Thieme's teachings have attracted a number of military personnel.

Even after his retirement, Thieme's ministry continued to grow worldwide in a number of ways. By January 2007, many of his books had been translated into several languages, including Spanish, Portuguese, German, Hungarian, Romanian, Korean, Chinese, Thai, Visayan, Ilonggo and Russian. Currently, his Bible lessons are broadcast on the radio in a number of US states, Africa, and the Philippines. Tape distribution centers have been opened in Australia, England, the Philippines, and Germany.

Berachah Church has and continues to support Christian missions, especially through an organization called Operation Grace: World Missions. OGWN currently supports missionaries in the United States, Mexico, Costa Rica, Brazil, Thailand, Korea, the Philippines, Africa, England, Ukraine, Russia, Belarus, Moldova, and Kazakhstan.

== 1988 U.S. presidential election ==
In the 1988 presidential campaign, vice presidential candidate Dan Quayle, though a practicing Presbyterian, was reported to have listened to Thieme's tapes with his father-in-law.

The Associated Press wrote that Thieme was "a fundamentalist preacher who routinely attacks unions, feminists and homosexuals. ...[Who] is known for his unorthodox biblical interpretations and his attack on liberals, welfare recipients and others." The New York Times referred to Thieme as "notable for his pulpit attacks on 'do-gooders and liberals,' 'power-mad labor,' welfare recipients, homosexuals, gun controllers, rock music, feminists and the 'satanic' United Nations." The titles of Thieme's tapes were also featured in stories questioning Quayle's adherence to such beliefs, including "Slave Market of Sin", "Satanic Plot No. 1", and "Scar Tissue of the Soul". The Times reported that Quayle's own parents also listened to Thieme tapes and even attended his conferences. The coverage upset Quayle's wife Marilyn who defended the listening of the tapes and defended Thieme's teaching. Quayle for his part held that he knew little of Thieme's views, pointing out that it was his wife who grew up listening to the tapes. He pointed out that his children have "never heard a Thieme tape. That's not part of our life."

The media focus on Thieme and Quayle led to a critical interview piece titled The Private Ministry of Colonel Thieme (Marilyn Quayle’s Theologian) by Garry Wills. It appeared in October 1989's first issue of the short-lived Wigwag magazine edited by Alexander Kaplen. Wills would go on to discuss Thieme in further detail in his 1990 book Under God: Religion and American Politics.

R. B. Thieme III later asserted that the press's reporting was a smear campaign typical of an election season.

== See also ==
- Free Grace theology
