= This Time (Thomas Wayne song) =

1958 song written by Chips Moman

Single by Thomas Wayne
- B-side: "You're The One That Done It"
- Released: March 1958
- Genre: Rock and roll
- Length: 2:12
- Label: Fernwood Records
- Songwriter: Chips Moman

"This Time" is a song written by Chips Moman, which was first recorded by Thomas Wayne and was released as a single on the Fernwood Records label in March 1958. On March 31, 1958, the song was released on the Mercury Records label, as the B-side of "You're The One That Done It".

== Background ==
This song is about rejection, and breaking up of a love relationship with a girl, who is leaving and going away for unknown reasons, except for saying too much. The singer states that there will be no more love and affection, including a goodnight kiss, because he is losing the girl.

== Troy Shondell version ==
"This Time"

Single by Troy Shondell
- B-side: "Girl After Girl"
- Released: 1961
- Genre: Rock and roll
- Length: 2:35
- Label: Goldcrest Records
- Songwriter: Chips Moman

Troy Shondell singles chronology
| "This Time" (1961) | "Tears From An Angel" (1961) |

In 1961, Troy Shondell released a version of the song, which became an international hit. Shondell's version was released on the Goldcrest Records label, and was later leased to Liberty Records for distribution. Shondell's version spent 13 weeks on the Billboard Hot 100 chart, peaking at No. 6, while reaching No. 4 on Norway's VG-lista, No. 4 on Canada's CHUM Hit Parade, No. 8 on New Zealand's "Lever Hit Parade", No. 18 on the United Kingdom's New Musical Express chart, and No. 22 on the United Kingdom's Record Retailer chart.

The song begins and ends with Spanish guitar strums. Those strums were borrowed for the ending of the instrumental surfing song "Mr. Rebel", by Eddie and the Showmen (1962).

=== Chart performance ===
| Chart (1961–1962) | Peak position |
|---|---|
| US Billboard Hot 100 | 6 |
| Norway - VG-lista | 4 |
| Canada - CHUM Hit Parade | 4 |
| New Zealand - Lever Hit Parade | 8 |
| UK - New Musical Express | 18 |
| UK - Record Retailer | 22 |

== Other recordings ==
- In 1981, Shakin' Stevens included a cover on his Shaky LP.
