= Berachah Church =

Church in Houston, Texas, United States

Coordinates: 29°44′15″N 95°27′55″W

Berachah Church is a Bible church founded in 1935 in Houston, Texas. It is part of the Christian Evangelistic Mission.

== History ==
Berachah Church was founded by C. W. Colgan, an oil company executive, who created it to evangelize Christianity. In 1950, Robert Thieme came to Berachah. Thieme met with the Board of Deacons at the close of his first Sunday service and recommended that they resign immediately. The board accepted this and from that moment on, according to Joe Wall, Thieme "became the dominant leader who brooked no challenge to his authority." Thieme was pastor at Berachah until he retired in 2003, at which time his only son, Robert "Bobby" Thieme III, was elected by the congregation of Berachah to serve as the new pastor.

=== Pastors ===
- C. W. Colgan (1935–1936)
- J. Elwood Evans (1936–1940)
- Richard Seume (1941–1946)
- William F. Burcaw (1946–1950)
- Robert Thieme (1950–2003)
- Robert B. Thieme III (2004-)

== Beliefs ==
According to the church's doctrinal statement, its purpose is to "present isagogical, categorical, and exegetical Bible teaching" and to "present the Gospel of the Lord Jesus Christ both at home and abroad." It holds to eternal security and a premillennial pre-tribulation rapture.

Under "Church Ordinances", the church's doctrinal statement lists only "the Lord's Supper". The Christian Evangelistic Mission, to which the church belongs, has in its doctrinal statement that the ordinances are "Baptism (of the Holy Spirit)" and "the Lord's Supper".

== Location ==
Colgan led a group that broke away from St. Mark's Methodist Church on Pecore. They met at The Heights Women's Club (extant) on Harvard Street, just off 20th Street.

During Evans' pastorship, the church built and occupied a small auditorium at 171 Heights Boulevard, while during Burcaw's time, the church transferred to 502 Lamar Street. The current location is 2815 Sage Road, Houston.
