= Merchant (disambiguation) =

A merchant is a businessperson who trades in commodities.

Merchant or Merchants may also refer to:

== Places ==
- Merchant, Virginia, an unincorporated community
- Merchant's House, Shepton Mallet, Somerset, England
- Merchant Hall, Bristol, England
- Merchant Hotel, a five-star luxury hotel in Belfast, Northern Ireland
- Merchants Building, Detroit, Michigan; on the National Register of Historic Places
- Merchant Tower, Campbellsville, Kentucky; on the National Register of Historic Places
- Merchants Bridge, a rail bridge in St. Louis, Missouri

== People ==
- Merchant (surname)
- Merchant W. Huxford (1798-1877), American physician, politician and mayor of Fort Wayne, Indiana

== Companies ==
- Merchants Insurance Group, an insurance company based in Buffalo, New York
- Merchants Trust, a large British investment trust
- Merchant International Group, a privately owned British strategic research and corporate intelligence company
- Merchants Transportation Company, a defunct American shipping firm

== Fiction ==
- The Merchant (fairy tale), a 1634 Italian literary tale by Giambattista Basile
- Merchant (Resident Evil), a fictional arms dealer from the Resident Evil series of video games

== Sports ==
- Norwich Merchants, a Canadian junior hockey team
- Ajax Merchants, a defunct Canadian junior hockey team
