= Huxford =

Huxford is a surname. Notable people with the surname include:

- Cliff Huxford (1937–2018), English footballer and manager
- Merchant W. Huxford (1798–1877), American physician and politician
- Neville Huxford (1937–2006), New Zealand cricketer
- Richard Huxford (born 1969), English footballer
- Vanessa Huxford (born 1970), English rugby union player
- Walter S. Huxford (1892–1958), American physicist
