= Henry C. Berghoff =

German American politician and businessman (1856–1925)

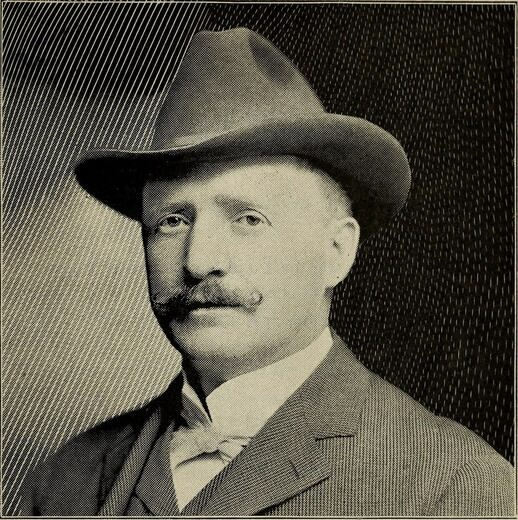
- Berghoff c. 1901

19th Mayor of Fort Wayne
- In office May 9, 1901 – January 1, 1906
- Preceded by: Henry P. Scherer
- Succeeded by: William J. Hosey

Personal details
- Born: January 6, 1856 Dortmund, Kingdom of Prussia
- Died: June 28, 1925 (aged 69) Fort Wayne, Indiana, U.S.
- Citizenship: American
- Party: Democratic
- Spouse: Theresa Mayer Berghoff (m. 1877)
- Children: 9
- Occupation: Politician, lawyer, businessman

Henry Carl Berghoff (January 6, 1856 – June 28, 1925) was a German American politician, lawyer, and businessman who co-founded the Herman Berghoff Brewing Company in 1887 and served as the 19th Mayor of Fort Wayne, Indiana from 1901 to 1906.

Berghoff was born January 6, 1856, in Dortmund, Kingdom of Prussia (now Germany), and immigrated to the United States in 1872, settling in Fort Wayne, Indiana in 1874. Along with three of his brothers, also German immigrants, he co-founded the Herman Berghoff Brewing Company in 1887, and in 1888, they opened their first Berghoff Brewery in Fort Wayne, serving Dortmunder-style Berghoff's Beer. Henry Berghoff held positions in and established various other local businesses throughout his career. A lifelong Democrat active in the party's local leadership, he also became involved with local Fort Wayne politics, serving three terms as Treasurer of Fort Wayne from 1883 to 1889 and as Comptroller of Fort Wayne from 1896 to 1901. He mounted an unsuccessful campaign for Indiana State Treasurer in 1890. In 1893, he assisted the county sheriff in putting down a local riot. From 1900 to 1902, he served as Chairman of the Allen County Democratic Committee.

In the 1901 Fort Wayne mayoral election, Berghoff received the Democratic nomination for Mayor of Fort Wayne. He went on to defeat Republican Charles E. Reese and Socialist Martin H. Wefel in the general election after a heated campaign in which his Republican opponents harshly criticized his German background. He took office upon being sworn in on May 9. As mayor, Berghoff presided over the opening of the first electric interurban railroad in Fort Wayne in 1901, the completion of the current Allen County Courthouse in 1902, the completion of the South Wayne Sewer at the end of 1902, and the appointment of the first Fort Wayne Board of Parks Commissioners in 1905. He took sweeping actions throughout his mayoralty to restrict immorality and crime in the city. Nevertheless, he came under controversy for his handling of the threat of a water famine in 1901, his refusal to approve the bond of Robert B. Dreibelbiss for his appointment to the Fort Wayne Municipal Court in 1902, and his approval of an ordinance granting a municipal franchise to the Fort Wayne Electric Light and Power company in 1904. In 1905, Berghoff was defeated in a bid for City Councilman-at-large. Berghoff left office on January 1, 1906, after serving a four-and-a-half-year term as mayor of Fort Wayne (the only mayor of Fort Wayne to do so).

After his mayoralty, Berghoff returned to business with the Berghoff Brewery and various other local establishments, most notably the German-American National Bank, which he had co-founded in 1905, and Rub-No-More Soap Company. Berghoff died in Fort Wayne on June 28, 1925 after suffering an apoplectic stroke, survived by his wife and several children.

== Early life ==
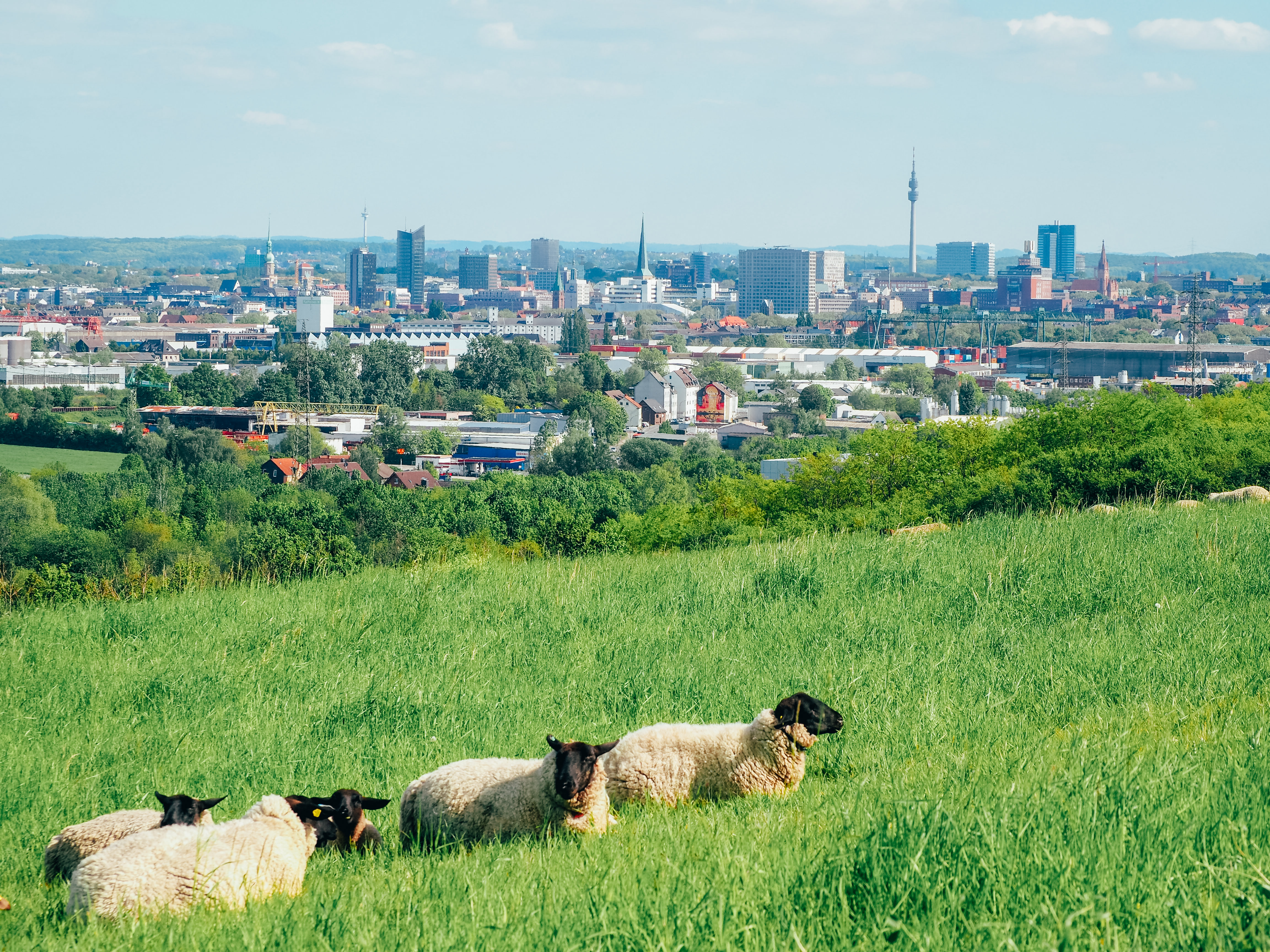
Skyline of Dortmund, Germany, where Berghoff was born on January 6, 1856.

Henry Carl Berghoff was born January 6, 1856, in Dortmund, Germany (then Prussia), the son of Franz Anton and Lizette (Boelhauve) Berghoff. Franz Anton, a carpenter, was described by the Fort Wayne Journal-Gazette as "a prominent burgher" of the city. Henry had five brothers (Theodor, Anton, Herman, Hubert, and Gustav) and one sister (Elizabeth). In Dortmund, after receiving a high school education and graduating from Dortmund University, Henry first held an office job at a mercantile institution, and subsequently held a job at a bank. He worked in Cologne for one of the largest banking institutions in Germany.

In 1872, following the lead of his older brother Herman, Henry immigrated to the United States; following a two-year stay in Pittsburgh, the brothers settled in Fort Wayne, Indiana in 1874. They chose to settle in Fort Wayne supposedly after Henry was offered a job there when the train they were aboard made a stop in the city. Their younger brothers, Hubert and Gustav, later immigrated to the United States and also settled in Fort Wayne. During the next few years after his arrival in the United States, Henry held a range of jobs as a clerk and a bookkeeper, most notably working for a year as an insurance solicitor for the S.C. Lumbard Agency, six years as the bookkeeper for a local grocery store known as A.C. Trentman, and two years as the local agent for the Christian Moerlein Brewing Company. He also studied law, and began practicing as a lawyer.

On September 18, 1877, Berghoff married Theresa Mayer, with whom he would have nine children.

== Business and political career ==
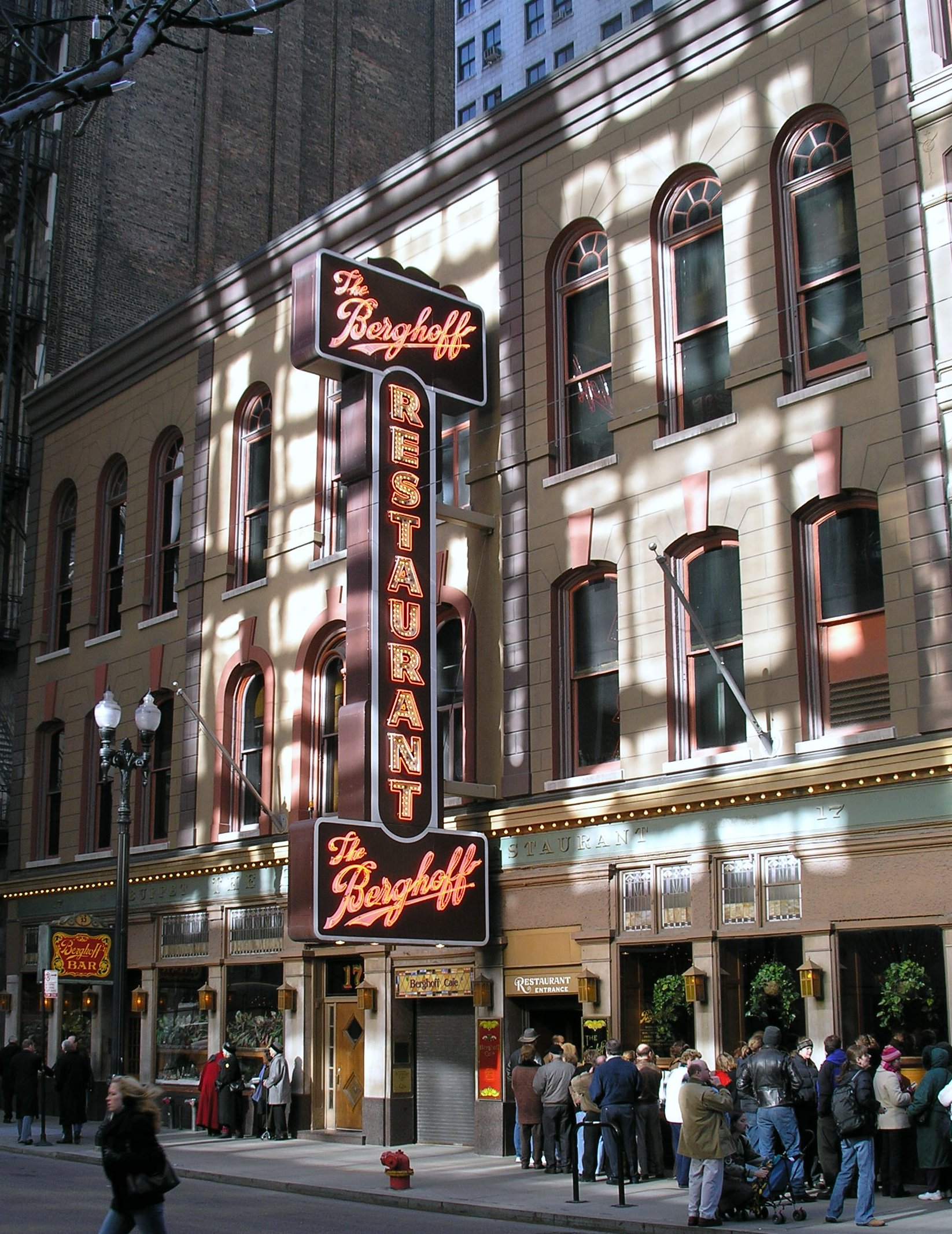
The Berghoff Restaurant, which was founded by Henry's brother, Herman Berghoff, in Chicago in 1898.

=== Business career ===
In 1883, Berghoff and his brother Herman bought East End Bottling Works, a bottling company in Fort Wayne. On May 25, 1887, Henry and his brothers Herman, Hubert, and Gustav, established the Herman Berghoff Brewing Company in Fort Wayne. The brand of beer Henry and his brothers sold under the Herman Berghoff Brewing Company was known as "Berghoff’s Beer." This Dortmunder-style beer was made with ingredients imported from Germany. In 1888, the brothers opened their first Berghoff Brewery in Fort Wayne. At the brewery, Berghoff's Beer was brewed and sold. On August 22, the brothers experienced a setback when the brewery caught fire, resulting in $50,000 in damages. Brewing resumed exactly a month later. Demand for their beer grew, and by 1890, the brothers were outputting 90,000 barrels of lager a year. In 1893, their brand was brought to national attention when Herman sold Berghoff's Beer at the Chicago World's Fair. In 1898, Herman opened a restaurant called The Berghoff, in Chicago, where it is still family owned and operated today. The restaurant served Berghoff's Beer. Around this time, the name of the Herman Berghoff Brewing Company was changed to the "Berghoff Brewing Company." By the end of his life, Henry had served as vice president, Secretary, and Treasurer of the Berghoff Brewing Company.

In 1892, Gustav purchased a Fort Wayne soap manufacturing company called Summit City Soap Works, where Henry held the position of vice president. Henry also entered into a partnership with Artificial Ice Company, was the proprietor of Globe Spice Mills, manager of Crescent Paper Company in New Haven, owner of the Monning Flouring Company, and was the treasurer of Phoenix Building and Savings Union.

=== Early political career ===
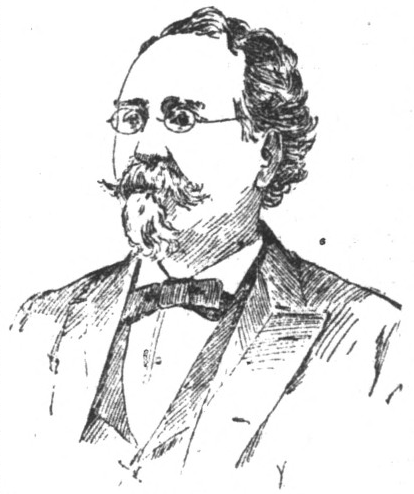
Albert Gall, who defeated Berghoff for the Democratic nomination for Indiana State Treasurer in 1890

Berghoff, a lifelong Democrat, became involved in local politics. In April 1883, Berghoff received the Democratic nomination for treasurer of Fort Wayne. He was victorious in the general election, and took office on September 3, succeeding Charles M. Barton. He was re-elected as treasurer of Fort Wayne twice, running unopposed in the May 1885 general election and defeating Republican nominee Allan H. Dougall and Union Labor nominee Charles J. Sosenheimer in the general election of May 1887. Berghoff left office on August 31, 1889, after declining to seek a fourth term. He was succeeded by Sosenheimer. On April 24, 1885, during his re-election campaign for treasurer, Berghoff was involved in a physical altercation with Captain Christian Hettler at a Fort Wayne saloon. After Hettler criticized Berghoff's performance as treasurer and called him names, Berghoff, feeling insulted, struck Hettler in the neck. The two exited the building to continue the altercation after receiving a warning from the saloonkeeper that violence was unacceptable inside his saloon. Outside, the fight was broken up by mutual friends, and neither Berghoff nor Hettler received any serious injuries. Nevertheless, according to The Fort Wayne News And Sentinel, Berghoff left "a clean and exemplary record" as treasurer.

In 1890, Berghoff sought the Democratic nomination for Indiana State Treasurer, but was defeated by businessman Albert Gall at the September 3 Democratic State Convention in Indianapolis, placing a close second. This endeavor, which included Berghoff's canvassing of every county in the state for votes, helped him gain statewide political prominence. In the general election, he endorsed Gall, who was victorious.

On Memorial Day in 1893, Fort Wayne railway workers went on strike, demanding their pay be increased from thirteen and a half cents an hour to fifteen cents an hour. The workers quickly resorted to rioting. Sheriff E. F. Clausmeier appointed multiple civilians to the position of deputy sheriff, including Henry Berghoff, to assist him with putting down the disturbances. On June 2, Berghoff spoke at the meeting that was held to review measures to put down the riots. The rioting ended that day after the strikers’ demands of wage increase were met.

In 1894, Berghoff was expected to receive the Democratic nomination for Indiana State Treasurer by acclamation; nevertheless, he declined to be considered one day prior to the August 15 Democratic State Convention in Indianapolis. The nomination ultimately went to former Indiana State Senator Morgan Chandler, who was defeated in the general election.

In May 1896, former Mayor Henry P. Scherer, a Democrat, was elected Mayor of Fort Wayne. After taking office on May 7, Scherer appointed Berghoff to succeed J. H. Simonson as comptroller of Fort Wayne. Berghoff took office on May 9, serving as comptroller for five years until Scherer's term expired on May 9, 1901. Upon the completion of his tenure, The Fort Wayne News And Sentinel stated that Berghoff did the city "excellent service as comptroller." While serving as comptroller, Berghoff was chosen to be a delegate to a meeting of the National Democratic Party in Indianapolis on August 7, 1896. He had expressly opposed this appointment, stating that he was still undecided on the question of bimetallism, the main issue of the 1896 U.S. Presidential Election. Berghoff ultimately did not attend, and the next day, he endorsed Democratic nominee William Jennings Bryan and the free silver movement.

On March 31, 1900, Berghoff was elected Chairman of the Allen County Democratic Committee, succeeding William Kaough. He served until March 15, 1902, when he was replaced by Walpole E. Colerick. While serving as chairman on November 5, 1900, Berghoff released a statement alleging that the local Republican Party paid African-American men from Cincinnati and Chicago to work on the construction of Fort Wayne streets and sewers, ultimately so that they could stay in the city and vote, albeit illegally, in the 1900 U.S. Elections. He stated that, if any of these men voted illegally, they would "be hauled to jail without ceremony," and that "jail yawns for any man who tries to cast an illegal vote." Berghoff claimed that he had the names, dates of arrival, and information on the residence of the would-be illegal voters. The Fort Wayne Daily News lambasted Berghoff's claims, stating that he seemed to ignore any possibility of illegal voting by the white companions of the African-American men. On top of racial discrimination, the Daily News accused Berghoff of voter intimidation. The newspaper declared that "the tone of his interview is such as to terrify those who are really entitled to vote," since the laborers that had come from outside Fort Wayne had returned home prior to Berghoff issuing his statement. It insisted that those who partook in voter intimidation should be arrested. Mocking Berghoff's earlier statement, the Daily News stated, "the jail yawns, for any man who attempts to intimidate a legal voter."

By 1901, Berghoff had also served as Chairman of the District Democratic Committee and as a Member of the Indiana Democratic Committee.

=== 1901 Fort Wayne mayoral election ===
Following the primary the day prior, Berghoff received the Democratic nomination for mayor of Fort Wayne on April 3, 1901, at the city's Democratic convention. The Republican nominee for mayor was Charles E. Reese, a former employee of the Berghoff Brewery, local public official, and army officer. The Socialist nominee for mayor was Martin H. Wefel, a clerk and traveling salesman.

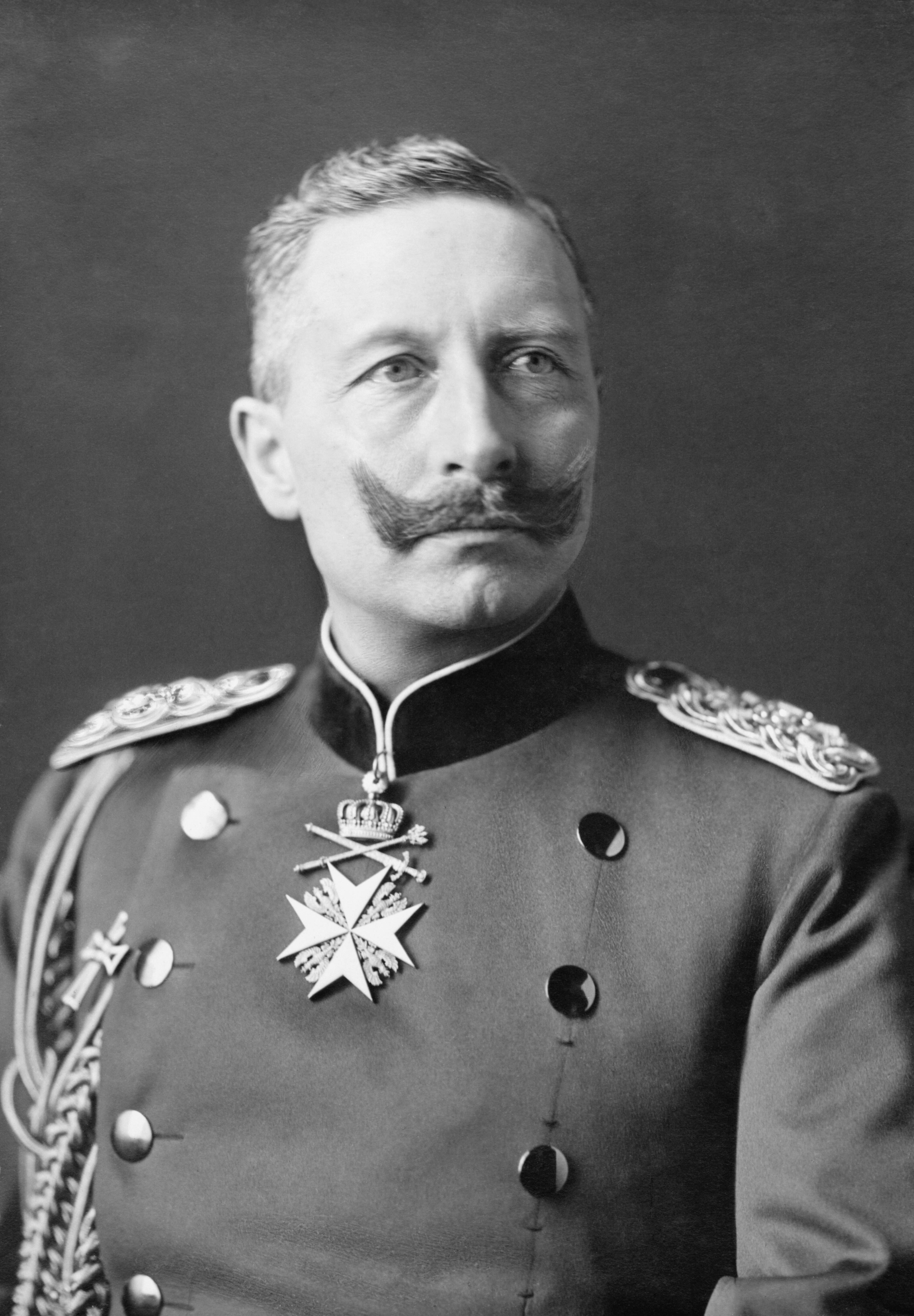
Kaiser Wilhelm II, to whom Berghoff was often mockingly compared

The 1901 Fort Wayne Mayoral Election was a very heated and partisan election. Local newspapers played major roles in spreading views of the candidates. The Fort Wayne News endorsed Reese, and the Fort Wayne Journal-Gazette endorsed Berghoff, being labeled as "Berghoff's mouthpiece". During this time, Americans held unfavorable views towards Kaiser Wilhelm II and the German Empire, and shortly after Berghoff's nomination, in an attempt to pander to popular perception, the News, supported by local Republican politicians, mocked and criticized Berghoff's German origins, dubbing him “Henry Czar Breakoff,” “Kaiser Berghoff,” “Czar Berghoff,” and “Herr Berghoff.” All of these terms mocking Berghoff for his ethnic background were considered ethnic slurs. The News even published a pseudo letter written under Berghoff's name, declaring “I have nominated myself for burgomaster.” These statements were heavily criticized as offensive and xenophobic by the Journal-Gazette as well as Berghoff's supporters. Supporters of Reese were also labeled hypocrites, as Reese himself was of German heritage.

The News connected Berghoff's German heritage with authoritarianism and corruption, accusing him of being a dictatorial party boss who would run Fort Wayne akin to how Kaiser Wilhelm II ruled Germany. Considered by the Journal-Gazette to be slander, opponents labeled him an “absolute dictator,” declaring that "the imperialistic policy assumed by Czar Berghoff is distressing to the liberty loving democratic voters".

In what was considered an attempt to win over some of the German-American vote for Reese, some Republican politicians began referring to Reese's German heritage in a positive light. Nevertheless, the Journal Gazette stated, "The German-American vote remains intact for Berghoff."

Other issues discussed included Berghoff and the Democrats’ opposition to the power granted to the Governor of Indiana to make city appointments, the support for a municipal lighting plant, and the Democratic slogan of “home rule.” The Republican platform centered around criticism of the Scherer administration's management of the city's sewers, finances, public works, water policy, and accountability to the law.

Berghoff won the May 7, 1901 general election with 5176 of the 9209 votes cast, or about 56 percent of the vote. Reese came in second with 3317 votes (36 percent), and Wefel finished a distant third, garnering 716 votes (8 percent). Berghoff was sworn in two days later.

== Mayor of Fort Wayne ==
=== Administration ===
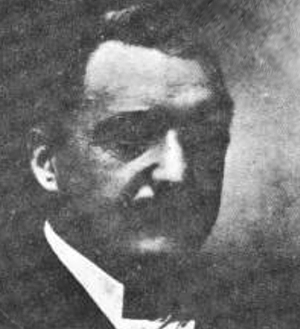
Henry C. Berghoff as Mayor of Fort Wayne

Berghoff, who succeeded Henry P. Scherer, served as mayor of Fort Wayne from May 9, 1901, to January 1, 1906. Throughout his mayoralty, Berghoff, along with other city officials, annually wrote messages to the Common Council of Fort Wayne, informing them on the administrative business and condition of the city. Immediately after taking office as mayor of Fort Wayne at noon on May 9, 1901, Berghoff appointed W. H. Shambaugh as city attorney, Joseph Fox as comptroller, and Peter Eggeman, William Doehrmann, and Henry C. Zollinger as members of the Board of Public Works.

=== 1901 Indiana District Turnfest ===
On June 15, 1901, the biennial Indiana District Turnfest (a German gymnastic festival) was held in Fort Wayne. Over 3000 people, from Indiana, Illinois, Ohio, and Kentucky, of German and Anglo descent, attended the event. Berghoff delivered a rousing speech at the event, praising Germans for their contributions to America, saying, "The Germans have done more toward the progress and up-building of this country in every avenue of commerce, of art, and of learning, than any or all other peoples on earth, and every intelligent American will admit it." Berghoff, "proud of being a German," emboldened the audience, whom he referred to as "we Germans in America," to not forget their "mother tongue," to preserve "the customs of their fathers," and that they "may well feel proud of our nation." Berghoff, after stating "we need not be ashamed of our ancestry," criticized those who avoided demonstrations of their German heritage: "Such do not deserve the name of Germans." Berghoff claimed that a minimum of two thirds of Fort Wayne citizens were German, and believed this indicated that second and third generation German-Americans still harbored their German identity. At the close of the Turnfest, The Journal Gazette claimed, "It will go down in history as the most successful ever held in the Indiana district." Berghoff's identification as a German, instead of a German American, strengthened the image of Fort Wayne as an exemplar of ethnic acceptance. Berghoff attained success without forgoing the cultural elements of his heritage or his ethnicity.

=== City water ===
Berghoff's decisions surrounding city water proved crucial and controversial. The first challenge that Berghoff's administration encountered occurred in July 1901, with the threat of a water famine in Fort Wayne, after a fire destroyed the city's reservoir. He stated that he consulted with experts and local businessmen on what should be done to prevent the impending water famine, and they decided on increasing the pump capacity of Fort Wayne's two water plants. A new air plant was installed at the first water plant, and a new 6 million gallon pump was installed at the second water plant. Additionally, Berghoff ordered that the water from a canal basin flow into the main supply of the city's water for ten hours, in order to give the city a larger supply of water. As a result of these new installations, he believed, "the needs of the city for many years to come" would be supplied (six or seven million gallons of water would be pumped through the two water plants a day, and 140 gallons of water a day would be pumped for each Fort Wayne citizen). Nevertheless, Berghoff and his administration came under scrutiny after the water from the canal basin polluted the city's water. He accepted the blame for the pollution, arguing that the impending necessity for more water had justified his actions.

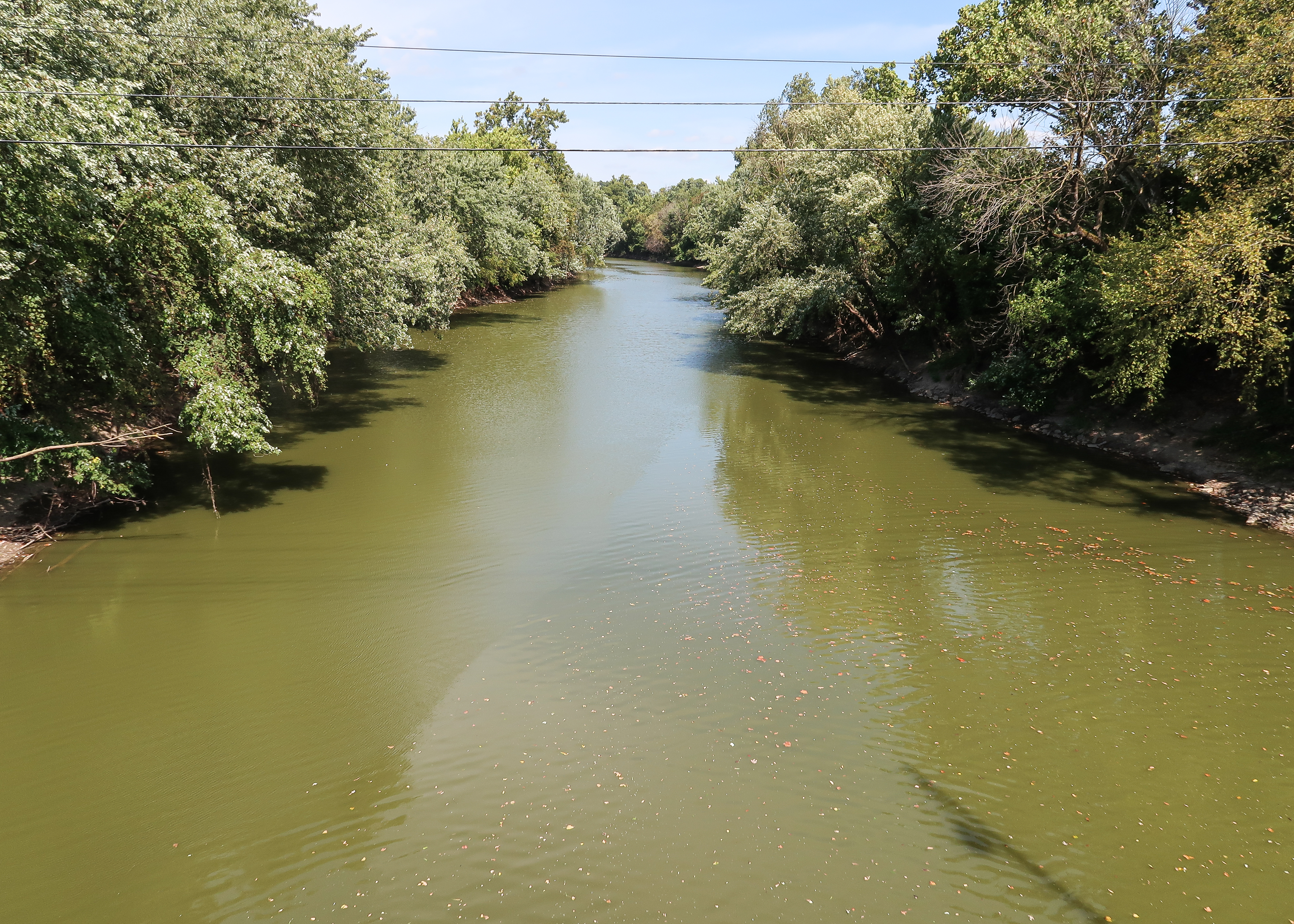
St. Marys River in Fort Wayne, Indiana

In November 1903, water contaminated with typhoid bacteria from the St. Marys River entered Fort Wayne's main water supply, causing an outbreak of typhoid fever in Fort Wayne. It was not until February 1904 that the City Health Commissioner, Dr. A. H. Macbeth, alerted the public about the presence of typhoid bacteria in their drinking water. Despite there being over 80 new cases of typhoid fever in Fort Wayne, The Journal Gazette defended him, instead putting the blame for the typhoid fever outbreak on Republican waterworks trustees who had taken charge of the water plant in 1903. However, journalist Jesse Greene, writing in The Fort Wayne Sentinel, stated that a 1900 city ordinance required the health commissioner, and not the waterworks trustees, to run weekly tests on the city's water. Greene also called on Berghoff to demand Macbeth's resignation, which Berghoff did not do. On March 26, 1904, Berghoff announced to Fort Wayne citizens that their drinking water was safe to drink again. In the statement, Berghoff chose not to blame anyone, most notably the Republican waterworks officials, for the typhoid fever outbreak.

=== Public works ===
Public works became a major focus of Berghoff's administration. In September 1901, the first electric interurban railway in Fort Wayne, the Fort Wayne and Northern Indiana Traction Company line, was opened. This helped establish Fort Wayne as an important center of freight and passenger traffic in the Midwest.

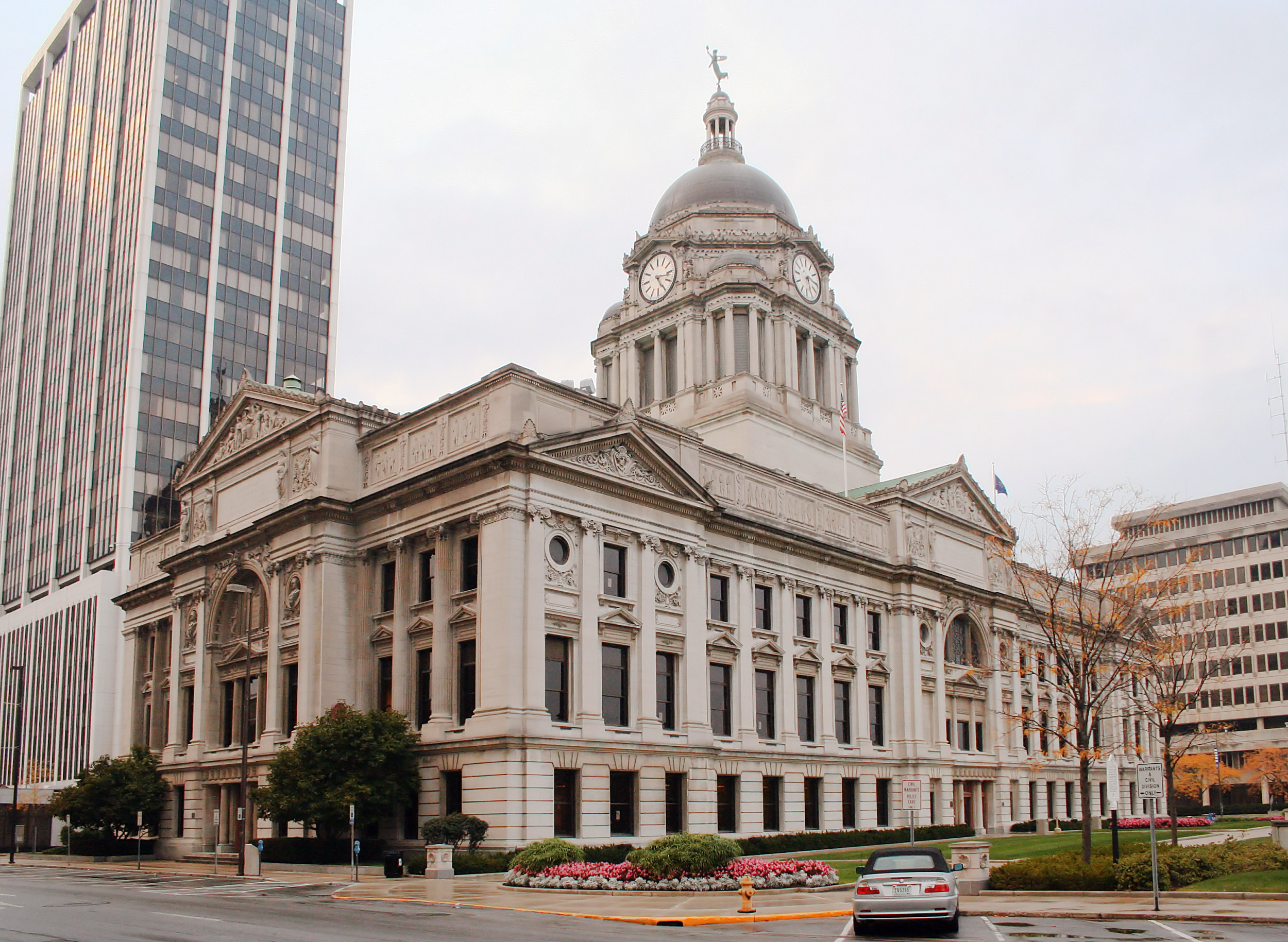
The Allen County Courthouse, which was dedicated in September 1902 with Mayor Berghoff present

Berghoff presided over the completion of the construction of the Allen County Courthouse in Fort Wayne, which had begun on November 17, 1897, during the Scherer administration. The courthouse was designed by architect Brentwood S. Tolan. On September 23, 1902, the Allen County Courthouse was dedicated, and Berghoff was present at the courthouse's dedication ceremonies. Governor Winfield T. Durbin attended the dedication ceremonies, and President Theodore Roosevelt was scheduled to be present as well; he ultimately did not attend. The courthouse would go on to be added to the National Register of Historic Places in 1976, and became a National Historic Landmark in 2002.

At the end of 1902, the mayor officially announced the completion of the South Wayne Sewer. The construction of the South Wayne sewer had begun under his predecessor, with Berghoff supporting it through its completion. Berghoff had ensured that lateral drains also be attached to the sewer, so that, in his own words, "the people could have the benefit of this outlet." However, the construction of the South Wayne Sewer was heavily criticized as a waste of funds. Nevertheless, he hailed the South Wayne Sewer as being "first-class in every respect," and in his annual message at the end of 1903, Berghoff commended it as having "gave relief as an outlet to the whole of South Wayne, as well as the territory in the southern, southwestern and western part of the city." Remarking on the public popularity of the sewer, he stated, "It was thought that the building of the Intercepting and South Wayne Sewers would bankrupt the city, but when the work was completed and the purposes of them enjoyed, the people ceased to complain." Because of this, he affirmed, the cleanliness of Fort Wayne had been greatly improved.

In his annual message at the end of 1903, Berghoff indicated that more work had been done for public works in 1903 than any year prior in the city's history (that year, more than 4.16 miles of street improvements had been made, 9.5 miles of sewer had been laid, some public bridges were repaired and painted, and a garbage crematory that had burned down had been rebuilt). Berghoff made the same claim in his annual message the following year (in which five miles of street pavements, 3.5 miles of sidewalk, and 5.5 miles of sewer were laid in addition to much street grading and alley paving).

Berghoff had been in favor of constructing a municipal lighting plant (which the city of Fort Wayne would own and operate) throughout his political career, believing it to be Fort Wayne's most important priority (at the time, it was a popular idea among Fort Wayne citizens). Nevertheless, he gradually changed his position, and in 1903 decided against the construction of a municipal plant, instead opting for a privately owned corporation to be the city's main lighting supply, stating, "there is so much corruption in American cities that public utilities can be more economically managed by private corporations." On February 12, 1904, Berghoff, with the approval of the Fort Wayne City Council, signed General Ordinance 223, which granted a 31-year contract for a municipal lighting franchise to the Fort Wayne Electric Light and Power company, a private corporation. The Fort Wayne Sentinel criticized his actions as having "broke faith with the people." However, the Fort Wayne News praised the new franchise, stating that "its work will meet the entire approval of the people," and indicating that a majority of the people supported the franchise. The News also stated their belief that the then-current cost of electricity would be less under the franchise. The construction of a municipal lighting plant was later begun in 1906, and the plant was opened in 1908, all during the mayoralty of Berghoff's successor, William J. Hosey.

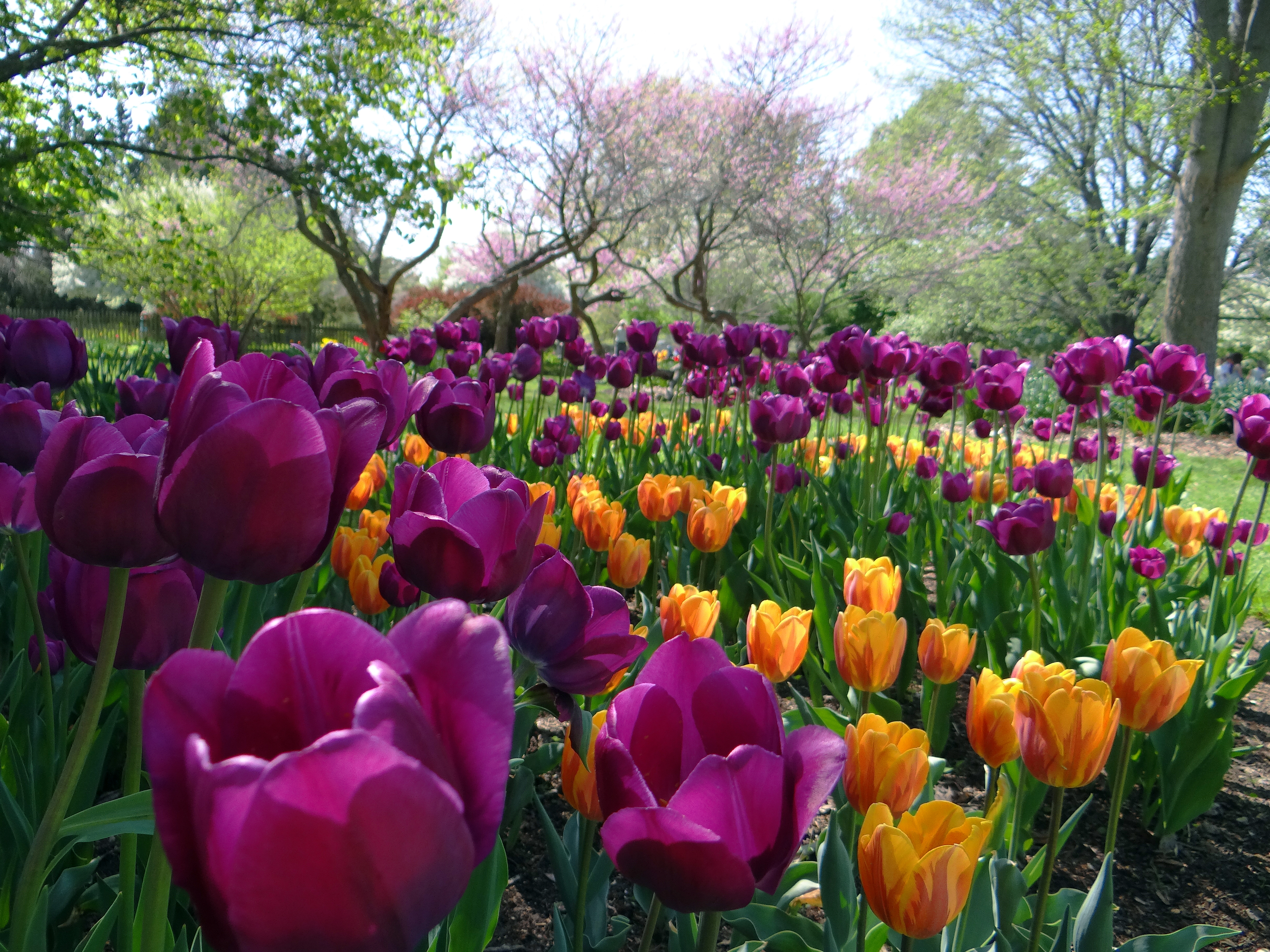
Foster Park, named after Colonel David N. Foster, one of Berghoff's appointees to the Board of Parks Commissioners

In April 1905, Berghoff appointed the first Fort Wayne Board of Park Commissioners. Berghoff's appointees, namely Oscar W. Tresselt, David N. Foster, Joseph M. Singmaster, and Ferdinard Meier, were confirmed by City Council on June 6. The work of the Board of Park Commissioners was previously executed by the Board of Public Works, however, its creation was mandated after the passage of the Cities and Towns Act passed by the Indiana General Assembly that year.

=== State, ex. rel., v. Berghoff ===
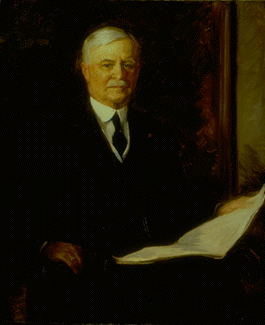
Governor Winfield T. Durbin, who appointed Robert Dreibelbiss to the Fort Wayne Municipal Court

In April 1902, Berghoff was involved in a legal controversy when the Indiana State Supreme Court, ruling against Berghoff in State, ex. rel., v. Berghoff, declared valid the appointment made by Indiana Governor Winfield T. Durbin of Robert B. Dreibelbiss. A Republican, Dreibelbiss had received an appointment as judge of the Fort Wayne Municipal (Police) Court, after the previous judge, George W. Louttit, a Democrat, had been removed from the bench on the grounds that the office had been created two days after the latter's election to the position. Berghoff, believing the grounds for Louttit's removal were unconstitutional and illegitimate, refused to approve Dreibelbiss’ official bond required by law to serve as judge of the Fort Wayne Municipal (Police) Court, effectively blocking his appointment. In the Indiana Circuit Court, Berghoff's opinion was upheld, nevertheless, upon further review in the Indiana Supreme Court, it was decided the governor's appointment was valid, as mentioned earlier.

=== Crime ===
In his annual message at the end of 1902, Berghoff stated that, from the beginning of his mayoralty, he had taken sweeping actions to restrict immorality and crime as much as possible in Fort Wayne. He ordered the removal of wine rooms from saloons, the prohibition of those of bad character from entering saloons, and the removal of notorious places from the city's business district. Berghoff also ordered the removal of gambling devices from public places in Fort Wayne. According to the mayor in his annual message at the end of 1903, his policies allowed for Fort Wayne to be “comparatively free from crime.”

=== Other mayoral activities ===
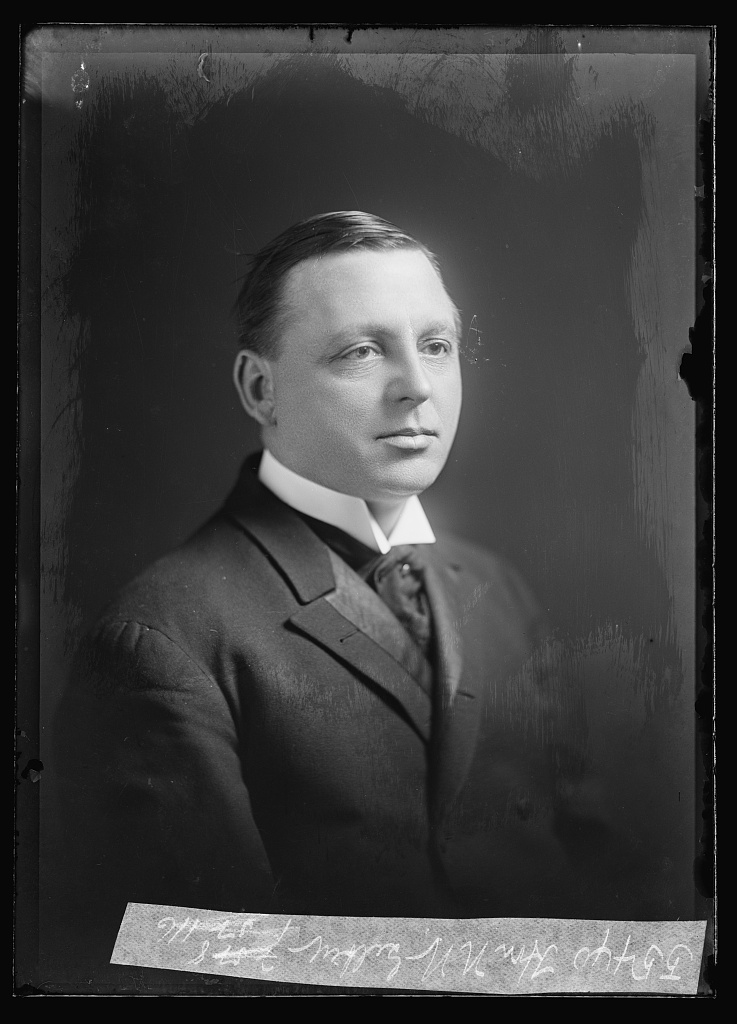
Lieutenant Governor Newton W. Gilbert, with whom Berghoff practiced law

In December 1901, Berghoff founded a new law firm with former Allen County Auditor Solomon A. Wood and Indiana Lieutenant Governor (and future U.S. Congressman) Newton W. Gilbert. The firm, called Gilbert, Berghoff & Wood, had its offices in Fort Wayne, and opened on January 1, 1902. Berghoff left the firm in 1905.

On July 14, 1904, Berghoff addressed the Indiana State Bar Association at its eighth annual meeting held in Fort Wayne, where he was hailed as "the best mayor of the best city in America" by the association's president, William P. Breen.

On August 9, 1904, Berghoff was involved in a physical altercation with a saloon keeper named Willis Doolittle, with the latter being upset that his petition for a new license had been opposed by the mayor with his filing of a remonstrance. After Doolittle became aggressive, Berghoff shoved him against a balcony rail. Doolittle claimed a possible fall could have killed him, and wanted to have the mayor arrested on charges of assault and battery with intent to kill. However, Allen County Prosecutor Underwood refused to prosecute Berghoff.

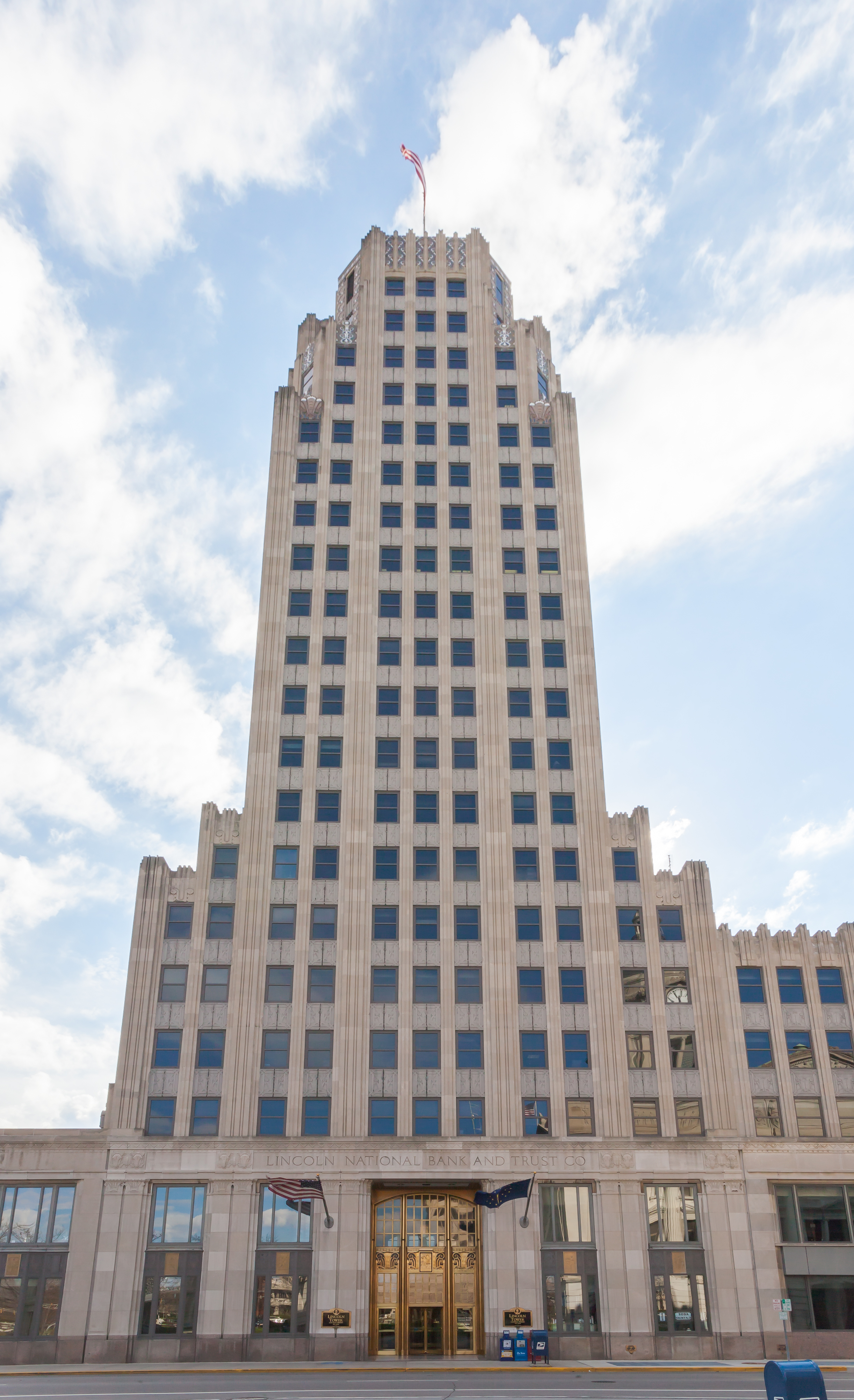
The Lincoln Bank Tower, which served as the headquarters of Lincoln National Bank beginning in 1930

In 1905, Berghoff assisted in the creation of the Fort Wayne-based German-American National Bank, where he served in various roles, including vice president, head cashier, and as a member of the board of directors. During World War I, it was renamed to "Lincoln National Bank" due to anti-German sentiment.

=== Run for City Councilman-at-large and end of administration ===
Berghoff, deciding against running for re-election as mayor, chose to pursue a Democratic nomination for City Councilman-at-large in September 1905. Five at-large seats were up for election, and thus five candidates from each party were nominated. He received one of the nominations. Berghoff's candidacy was heavily criticized by the Fort Wayne Sentinel, mostly due to his approval of the municipal lighting franchise of the Fort Wayne Electric Light and Power company in 1904. Municipal elections, including the election for mayor, were held on November 7, 1905; Berghoff was defeated in the general election for City Councilman-at-large, coming in third to last, receiving 3,876 votes.

In the 1905 mayoral election, Berghoff endorsed Democratic City Councilman William J. Hosey, who won the election. At the end of 1905, Mayor-elect Hosey wrote the mayor's annual message, instead of Berghoff, who was the incumbent mayor at the time.

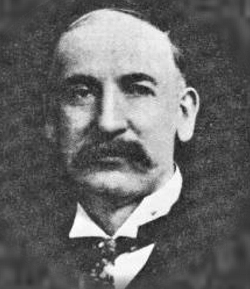
William J. Hosey, Berghoff's successor as Mayor

After serving one four-and-a-half-year term as mayor (the only mayor of Fort Wayne to do so), Berghoff left office at noon on January 1, 1906, and was succeeded by William J. Hosey. Before leaving office, Berghoff warned Hosey that the mayoralty was no "bed of roses.” After being sworn in, Hosey paid tribute to the outgoing administration, expressing his hope that his administration would be as clean as his predecessor's.

== Later life and death ==
After serving as mayor of Fort Wayne and losing election for City Councilman-at-large, Berghoff left politics for good and returned to business. Subsequent to his mayoralty, Berghoff held positions at Wayne Oil Tank & Pump Company and the German-American National Bank; he additionally continued to serve as vice president of Summit City Soap Works, renamed to "Rub-No-More Soap Company" in 1912. By 1917, Rub-No-More had topped $3 million a year in sales, was manufacturing 200 million bars of soap annually, and had gained international recognition.

Berghoff also had more time to pay attention to the Berghoff Brewery in Fort Wayne. In 1908, his brother Hubert stepped down as vice president and manager of the Berghoff Brewing Company due to poor health, and their brother Gustav became company president. A year later, the company was reorganized, and its name was changed to the "Berghoff Brewing Association." During World War I, the slogan of the company was changed from "A real German brew" to "A real honest brew," in order to honor the founding brothers' adopted homeland. The brewery had been producing 180,000 barrels of beer annually when the production of Berghoff's Beer was halted due to the onset of Prohibition in Indiana on April 12, 1918. The Berghoff Brewing Association was renamed to "Berghoff Products" and "Brewers of Bergo Soft Drinks," and began serving soft drinks and near bear to patrons. Henry Berghoff never lived to see the end of Prohibition in 1933, when beer was brewed once again at the Berghoff Brewery.

When World War I broke out in 1914, Berghoff had sympathized with the German side, however, once the United States entered the war in 1917, his attitude changed. He openly supported the American war effort, and advocated for his fellow citizens to purchase war bonds. During the war, three of Berghoff's sons served in the United States armed forces.

Berghoff died aged 69 on June 28, 1925, in Fort Wayne, Indiana, after suffering an apoplectic stroke three days before. On July 1, his remains were interred in Catholic Cemetery.

== Personal life and family ==
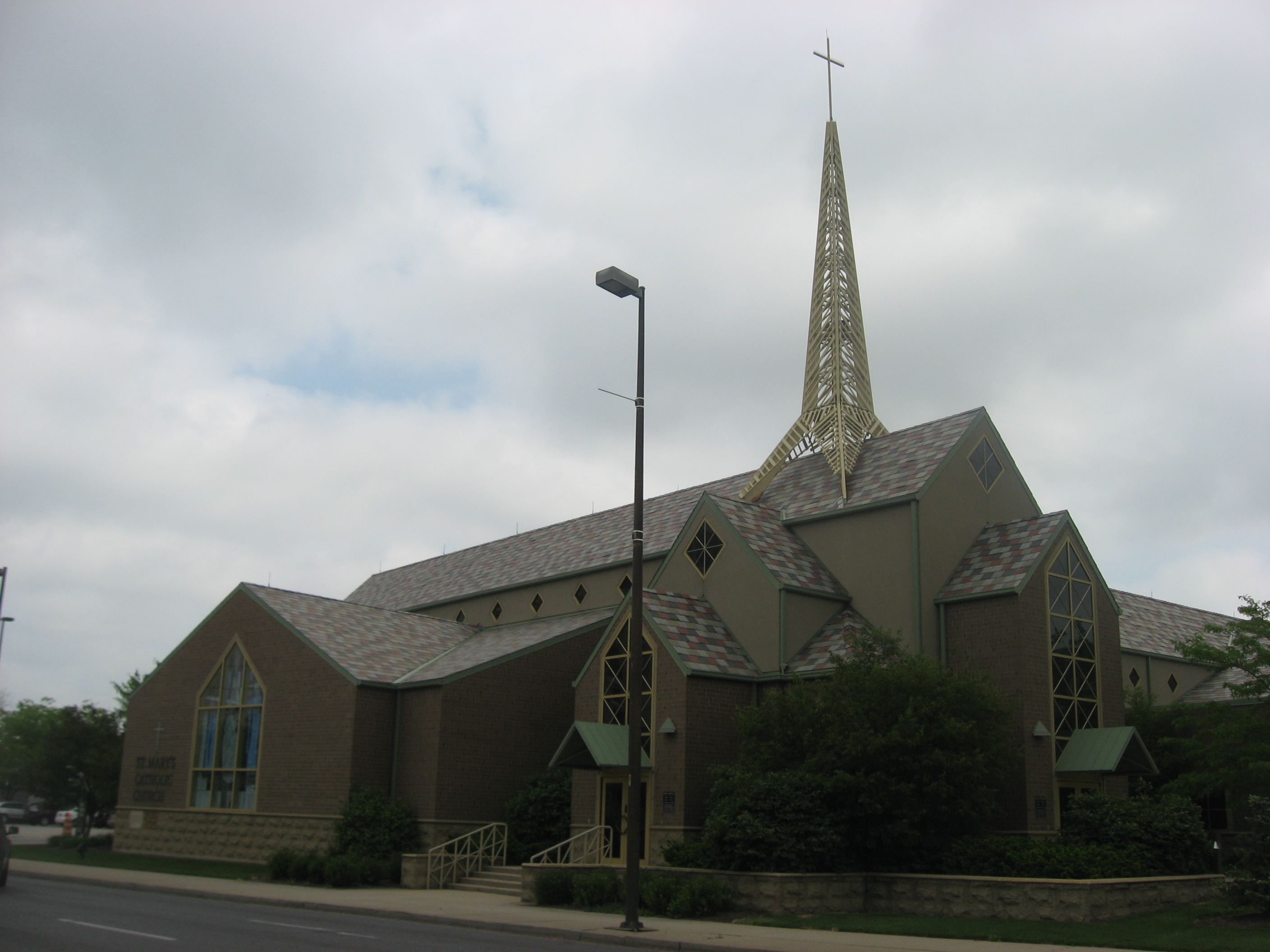
St. Mary's Catholic Church, where Berghoff was a parishioner.

Berghoff was trilingual, and could fluently speak German, English, and French. He styled his silver hair in a Bismarckian fashion, and also had a distinguished mustache. He ended all his speeches by saying, "God Bless the brave founders of our state."

Berghoff, a Catholic, was a member of St. Mary's Catholic Church, the Holy Name Society, the Knights of Columbus, and the Catholic Knights of America.

Berghoff and his wife had nine children, five of whom survived him, along with several grandchildren. His daughter Elsie was married to Edward C. Ehrman, the son of Edward J. Ehrman, who was a Fort Wayne City Councilman from 1898 to 1902, and Manager of Postal Telegraph Company. Berghoff's son, Fred, served as Chairman of the Fort Wayne Board of Public Safety, and another of his sons, Raymond, served as Allen County Coroner.

In addition to their home in Fort Wayne, Berghoff and his family owned a cottage on Sylvan Lake in Rome City, Indiana.

== See also ==
- The Berghoff (Restaurant)
- List of mayors of Fort Wayne

== Works cited ==
- Berghoff, Carlyn (August 15, 2011). The Berghoff Family Cookbook: From Our Table to Yours, Celebrating a Century of Entertaining. Andrews McMeel Publishing. ISBN 978-0-7407-9321-9.
- Brown, Nancy Eileen (May 2013). "The 1901 Fort Wayne, Indiana City Election: A Political Dialogue of Ethnic Tension" (PDF).
- Griswold, Bert Joseph (1917). The Pictorial History of Fort Wayne, Indiana: A Review of Two Centuries of Occupation of the Region about the Head of the Maumee River. Robert O. Law Company.
- Wayne (Ind.), Fort (1901). Annual Message of ... [the] Mayor of Fort Wayne, Indiana: With Annual Reports of Heads of Departments, of the City Government,...
- Wayne (Ind.), Fort (1902). Annual Message of ... [the] Mayor of Fort Wayne, Indiana: With Annual Reports of Heads of Departments, of the City Government,...
- Wayne (Ind.), Fort (1903). Annual Message of ... [the] Mayor of Fort Wayne, Indiana: With Annual Reports of Heads of Departments, of the City Government,...
- Wayne (Ind.), Fort (1904). Annual Message of ... [the] Mayor of Fort Wayne, Indiana: With Annual Reports of Heads of Departments, of the City Government,...
- Court, Indiana Supreme; Carter, Horace E.; Porter, Albert Gallatin; Tanner, Gordon; Harrison, Benjamin; Kerr, Michael Crawford; Black, James Buckley; Martin, Augustus Newton; Kern, John Worth (1903). Reports of Cases Argued and Determined in the Supreme Court of Judicature of the State of Indiana. Bobbs-Merrill Company.
- History of Fort Wayne & Allen County, Indiana, 1700-2005. M.T. Publishing Company, Incorporated. 2006. ISBN 978-1-932439-44-1.
- Quest Club (Fort Wayne, Ind ) (1994). The Quest for Fort Wayne : an anthology of papers about Fort Wayne, Indiana. Allen County Public Library Genealogy Center. Fort Wayne, Ind. : Allen County Public Library.

Political offices
Preceded by Henry P. Scherer	Mayor of Fort Wayne, Indiana; 1901 — 1906	Succeeded by William J. Hosey
