= Hosey =

Hosey is a surname. Notable people with the surname include:

- Dwayne Hosey (born 1967), former Major League Baseball outfielder
- Lance Hosey (1964–2021), American architect
- Lonnie Hosey (born 1946), American politician
- Steve Hosey (born 1969), former right fielder in Major League Baseball
- William J. Hosey (1854–1937), American politician and mayor of Fort Wayne, Indiana

== See also ==
- Hisey
- Hussein
