= Sharon Tucker =

American politician (born 1972)

37th Mayor of Fort Wayne
- Incumbent
- Assumed office April 23, 2024
- Preceded by: Tom Henry (deceased); Karl Bandemer (acting)

Personal details
- Born: 1972 (age 53–54) Fort Wayne, Indiana, U.S.
- Party: Democratic

Sharon Tucker is an American politician who has served as the 37th mayor of Fort Wayne, Indiana, since April 23, 2024. She previously represented the 6th District on the Fort Wayne City Council from 2020 to 2024 and served on the Allen County Council from 2015 to 2020. A member of the Democratic Party, Tucker previously served as a precinct chair for the Allen County Democratic Party, as well as treasurer of the party and vice-chair in 2016. Tucker was selected in a party caucus on April 20, 2024, to succeed Mayor Tom Henry following his death. She is the first Black mayor and the second woman to serve as mayor of Fort Wayne.
