= Winfield Moses =

American politician (born 1943)

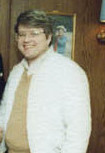

Member of the Indiana House of Representatives from the 81st district
- In office December 22, 1992 – December 22, 2012
- Preceded by: Constituency established
- Succeeded by: Martin Carbaugh

31st Mayor of Fort Wayne
- In office July 20, 1985 – January 1, 1988
- Preceded by: Cosette Simon
- Succeeded by: Paul Helmke
- In office January 1, 1980 – July 8, 1985
- Preceded by: Robert E. Armstrong
- Succeeded by: Cosette Simon

Personal details
- Born: February 20, 1943 (age 83) Fort Wayne, Indiana, U.S.
- Party: Democratic
- Education: Indiana University

Winfield "Win" C. Moses Jr. (born February 20, 1943) is a retired American politician from Fort Wayne, Indiana.

== Education ==
Moses graduated from South Side High School in Fort Wayne in 1960. He then went on to Indiana University, where he graduated in 1964 with BA degrees in economics and philosophy and an MBA in 1966. He also received an honorary PhD in political science from the Indiana Institute of Technology in 1998.

== Political career ==
Moses began his political career as a Fort Wayne city councilman, serving in this capacity from 1972 to 1979. Moses served as city council president in 1973 and 1979. He then was elected mayor, serving from 1980 to 1987. He was defeated in the 1987 election by Paul Helmke.

Moses served as the state representative of Indiana House District 81, a position he held from 1992 until his 2012 defeat.

Moses was defeated for re-election by Martin Carbaugh (R-Fort Wayne) on November 6, 2012. Carbaugh defeated Moses by 52 percent of the vote (11,656) to Moses' 44 percent (9,949). Alex Avery, a Libertarian Party candidate received four percent (932).

One of the key issues leading to Moses' defeat was his participation in a legislative walkout on Tuesday, February 22, 2011, with 36 other Democratic representatives in opposition to proposed legislation limiting union powers in Indiana. The Democratic departure left the House void of a quorum, leaving only 58 of the 67 representatives needed to establish a quorum. Moses and the other Democrats were away from the Statehouse for weeks while they took up residence at a motel in Urbana, Illinois.

In 1985, Moses resigned as mayor of Fort Wayne to accept responsibly for "reckless disregard for campaign financing". Cosette Simon, the city controller, assumed the mayor's position under Indiana law, the first woman in Fort Wayne history to do so. At a caucus of Democratic precinct committeepersons, Moses was re-elected mayor only eleven days later. Moses went on to serve two more years as mayor of Fort Wayne until 1987. The plea agreement spawned bumper stickers which read, "Win Moses, a Mayor of Conviction."

As mayor, he created a Utility Rate Increase Fighting Division of City Government. It intervened in over 20 utility cases and helped reduce utility rate increases by tens of millions of dollars. His efforts in that area have continued in the Indiana legislature.

Moses narrowly averted defeat by Republican Matt Kelty in the 2002 general election for state representative. Moses won the election by 63 votes, which was verified by a recount. His usual victory percentage in elections for state representative is approximately 60 percent.

He was opposed in the 2010 election by Mike Obergfell (R-Fort Wayne). Mr. Obergfell is a long-time teacher at Bishop Dwenger High School.

One of the issues in the 2002 campaign was Moses' residency. He owns a substantial home on the north side of Indianapolis. At the time, he listed his district address as an apartment in the Three Rivers Apartment complex in downtown Fort Wayne. In addition to his political career, Win Moses owns a mobile home park in Fort Wayne (Village of North Oak).

In the Indiana House of Representatives he has served as the majority whip. He has also served as chairman of the Rules committee, chairman of Local Government, and as a member of the following committees: Ways and Means, Public Health, Economic Development, Utilities, Financial Institutions, Public Policy, and the Environmental Committee. Moses was also a delegate to the Democratic National Convention in 1980, 1984, 1996, 2000 and 2004. Moses has also founded and participated in several other community action activities, including being the founding chairman of the Citizen Action Coalition, and Washington House Treatment.

Moses is a member of the Chamber of Commerce, NAACP, Rotary Club, Urban League, and I.U. Alumni Association among others. Moses has been honored with several awards throughout his political career including 1984 and 1996 Indiana Consumer Advocate of the year. United Senior Action's Legislator of the Year in 1992 and 2000. He was also the Outstanding Freshman Legislator in 1993. While mayor of Fort Wayne, he led the city to All America City honors and the most Livable City and the Gold Medallion for parks. Fort Wayne also received the United Way Outstanding City Award.

On June 1, 1980, Moses was prominently featured on the very first news story broadcast by CNN in his response to the shooting attempt of civil rights activist Vernon Jordan in Fort Wayne.

| Preceded by Robert E. Armstrong | Mayor of Fort Wayne, Indiana; 1980–1985 | Succeeded by Cosette Simon |
| Preceded by Cosette Simon | Mayor of Fort Wayne, Indiana; 1985–1987 | Succeeded by Paul Helmke |
