= 12th Indiana Infantry Regiment (1 year) =

- Active: May 11, 1861 – May 14, 1862
- Allegiance: Union
- Branch: Infantry
- Size: Regiment
- Engagements: American Civil War

Commanders
- Notable commanders: John M. Wallace, W. H. Link, Reub Williams

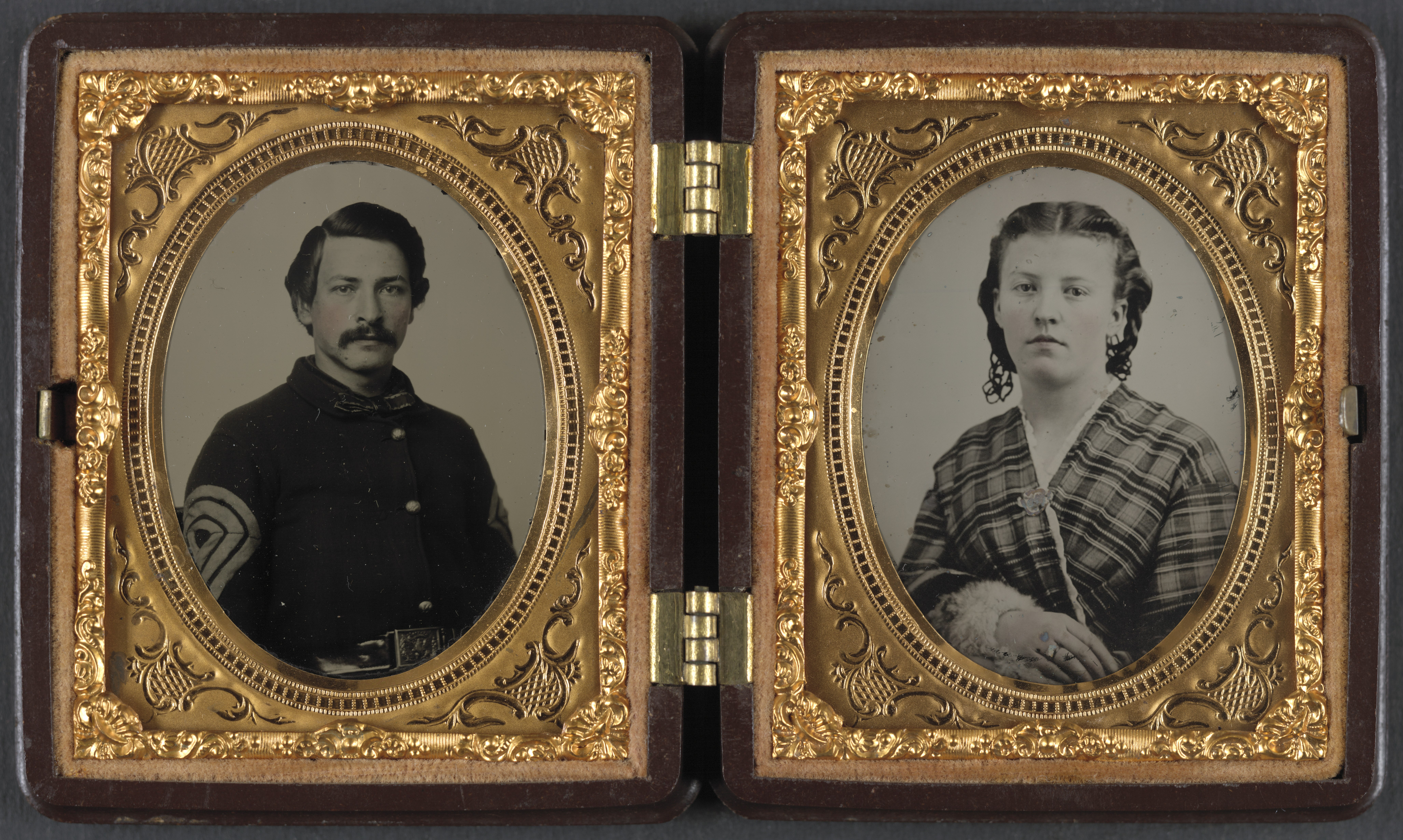
Captain Ferdinand F. Boltz of Co. S, 12th Indiana Infantry Regiment, with Siddie Boltz. From the Liljenquist Family Collection of Civil War Photographs, Prints and Photographs Division, Library of Congress

The 12th Indiana Infantry Regiment was an infantry regiment in the Union Army between May 11, 1861, and May 14, 1862, during the American Civil War.

== Service ==
The 12th Indiana Infantry was organized at Indianapolis, Indiana May 11, 1861, and mustered in for one year's service; it was transferred to U.S. service on July 18, 1861. The regiment was attached to Abercrombie's Brigade, Banks' Department of the Shenandoah, to October 1861. Abercrombie's Brigade, Bank's Division, Army of the Potomac, to March 1862. 2nd Brigade, Williams' 1st Division, Banks' V Corps, to April 1862, and Department of the Shenandoah to May 1862.

== Detailed service ==
Moved to Evansville, Indiana, June 11. Left Indiana for Baltimore, Maryland, July 23; then moved to Sandy Hook, Maryland, July 28. Duty at Harpers Ferry, Virginia, Williamsport, and Sharpsburg, Maryland, until March 1862. Advance on Winchester, Virginia, March 1–12. Skirmished at Stephenson's Station, near Winchester, March 11. Operations in the Shenandoah Valley until April. Duty at Warrenton Junction, Virginia, April 3 – May 5. Reconnaissance to Rappahannock River and skirmish at Rappahannock Crossing April 18. March to Washington, D.C., May 5.

== Casualties ==
The regiment lost a total of 24 enlisted men, all due to disease.

== See also ==
- List of Indiana Civil War regiments
- Indiana in the Civil War

== Bibliography ==
- Dyer, Frederick H. (1959). A Compendium of the War of the Rebellion. New York and London. Thomas Yoseloff, Publisher. LCCN 59-12963.
- Holloway, William R. (2004). Civil War Regiments From Indiana. eBookOnDisk.com Pensacola, Florida. ISBN 1-9321-5731-X.
- Terrell, W.H.H. (1867). The Report of the Adjutant General of the State of Indiana. Containing Rosters for the Years 1861–1865, Volume 7. Indianapolis, Indiana. Samuel M. Douglass, State Printer.
