= Citizens Square =

Government building in Fort Wayne, Indiana, US

Coordinates: 41°04′44″N 85°08′14″W

Citizens Square is a building in Fort Wayne, Indiana. It houses Fort Wayne's municipal government. In 2011, the building attracted media attention when it was almost named the "Harry Baals Government Center" after its former mayor. Citizens Square has shut down twice due to the COVID-19 pandemic, but it has remained open since January 2021.

== History ==
After the construction on the building was finished in 2011, city officials released an opinion poll to determine its name. The building garnered media attention when it became known that the leading name contender was the "Harry Baals Government Center", referring to Fort Wayne's former mayor Harry Baals (pronounced /ˈhæri ˈbɔːlz/, although Baals' descendants have chosen to pronounce their last name as /ˈbeɪəlz/). With over 1,000 votes, the suggested name tripled the vote total of the runner-up, "Thunder Dome". City officials ultimately chose the name "Citizens Square", fearing ridicule from late-night television and others not from Fort Wayne. The city's spokesperson said that the current mayor did not want to name the building after a person. The spokesperson also said that the city did not regret putting out the poll, commenting that it put some rare levity into government.

Jim Baals, the great-nephew of Harry Baals, expressed dissatisfaction that the mayor's name would not be considered, saying: "I've lived with that name for 51 years now, and I've gotten through it. I think everybody else can, too." In a 2016 article, Vox commented that the lesson was to "never leave anything up to Indiana voters".

On March 17, 2020, Fort Wayne officials announced that Citizens Square, along with all buildings owned by the city, was to close due to the COVID-19 pandemic until April 1. The building reopened on May 18 but closed again on November 23. It then reopened on January 25, 2021.
