= Robert E. Armstrong =

American politician (1925–2008)

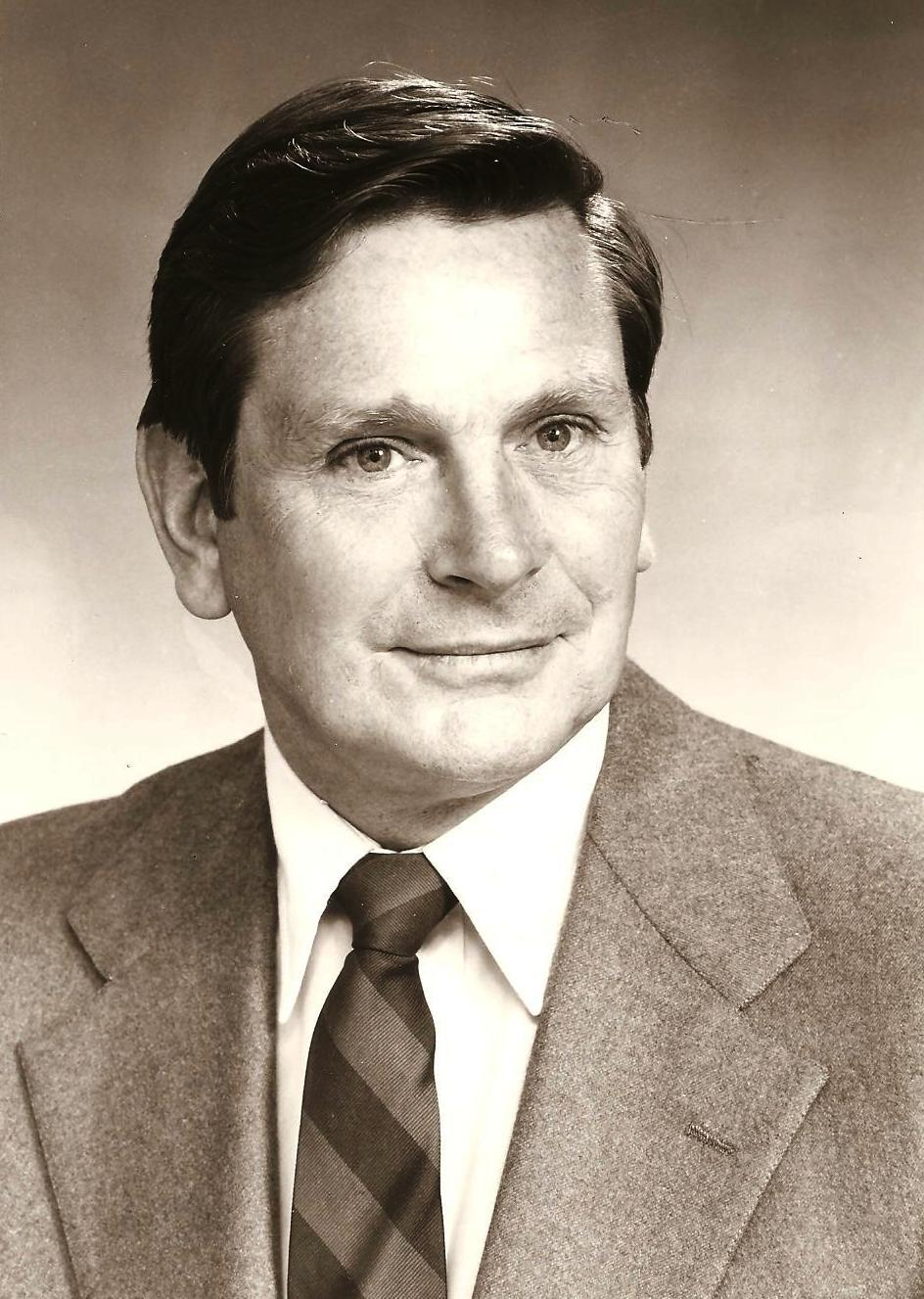

30th Mayor of Fort Wayne
- In office 1975–1979
- Preceded by: Ivan Lebamoff
- Succeeded by: Winfield Moses
- Constituency: Fort Wayne, Indiana

Allen County Councilman
- In office 1990–2002
- Constituency: 2nd County District

Personal details
- Born: September 24, 1925
- Died: August 21, 2008 (aged 82) Fort Wayne, Indiana, U.S.
- Party: Republican
- Spouse: Nila L. Armstrong
- Education: Indiana University
- Religion: Lutheran

Robert E Armstrong (September 24, 1925 – August 21, 2008) was an American politician who served as mayor of Fort Wayne, Indiana, former councilman of Allen County, Indiana, and former athletic director of Snider High School.

== Education ==
Mayor Bob Armstrong was a graduate of Fort Wayne's Central High School (closed 1971) where he played on the State Championship Basketball Team in 1943. He attended Indiana University where he received a B.S. in Education and Health, Physical Education and Recreation in 1949 and a M.S. in Administration in 1954. At Indiana, he was a member of the Sigma Nu fraternity and played and lettered on both the varsity basketball and football teams, and continued as a life member of the Indiana University Alumni Association as well as the Indiana University Varsity Club and I-Mens Association.

Armstrong also completed Post Graduate Coursework at Purdue University; Harvard Leadership Institutes; University of California; University of Saint Francis; Indiana-Purdue Universities; Indiana State University.

=== Military ===
From 1944 to 1945, Armstrong served in the United States Army Air Forces. He was training as a pilot to fight in World War II when the war ended, cutting his military service short. Bob was an active member of his local American Legion Post 47 throughout his life.

== Political career ==
Mayor Armstrong defeated Democratic incumbent Mayor Ivan Lebamoff in 1975 in a tight 27,145 to 26,761 victory. Armstrong helped Fort Wayne become a sister city with Takaoka, Japan. A large focus of his tenure was improving the city's budget. According to a 2000 News-Sentinel article, "[Armstrong] took a 'pile of studies' on downtown revitalization that languished on shelves and put them to use."

Bob Armstrong had been a candidate for Fort Wayne City Council in the 1971 municipal election.

Since his time as Mayor, Bob Armstrong had held other elected positions throughout Fort Wayne and Allen County. Beginning in 1990, Bob represented the Second district on the Allen County Council. He held this position for 12 years and served as President from 1996 to 1998. In 2002, he and three other council members (including Bob's good friend Bill Schnizer) lost reelection to a slate of younger candidates.

Armstrong was elected as one of Indiana's thirteen Presidential Electors and he cast his vote for Ronald Reagan on December 15, 1980.

=== Republican involvement ===
Starting in 1958, Armstrong was elected to serve as a delegate to the State Republican Conventions. Armstrong also served on the Indiana State Education Committee for Ronald Reagan's re-election, and was a political analyst on WANE-TV in 1980 on behalf of Republican candidates Ronald Reagan (President), Robert Orr (Governor), Dan Quayle (Senator), and Dan Coats (Congressman).

=== Name confusion ===
Residents of Fort Wayne have continually confused former mayor Robert E. Armstrong with another local, Robert A. Armstrong. The Robert Armstrong name recognition allowed Robert A. Armstrong to win a spot in the 2002 Fort Wayne Community School Board election, despite having spent zero money campaigning and his absence of any related experience. Despite attempts of local newspapers The News-Sentinel and The Journal Gazette to inform the public of these differences, the confusion has persisted. In 2008, Robert A. Armstrong won nomination as a Republican candidate for an at-large position on the Allen County Council despite having not spent a single dollar on his campaign.

== Education career ==
Armstrong served as athletic director and school administrator at Snider High School from 1964 to 1991, with the exception of the time he was mayor. Before this he was an educator at Boswell High School in Boswell, Indiana, Washington Junior High School in Fort Wayne, and Central High School in Fort Wayne.

As Snider athletic director, Armstrong was a founding member of the Indiana Interscholastic Athletic Administrators Association and was president of the organization for the 1969–1970 school year.

At Snider, Armstrong was responsible for directing and managing all athletic programs, budget and personnel, as well as the physical plant, priority use and planning, certification and registration for athletes and officials. He was additionally responsible for handling all public relations for Snider, and was a guidance counselor.

In 1992, the Robert E. Armstrong Scholarship was established at R. Nelson Snider High School. A scholarship is awarded each year to an outstanding scholar-athlete to further their college education. 17 scholarships have been awarded to date, providing assistance to these students in the furtherance of their education.

=== Community involvement ===
Armstrong began the Fort Wayne tradition of neighborhood summer swim clubs with the establishment of Pocahontas Swimming & Tennis Club in 1959. From 1959 to 1973, Armstrong managed and coached the swim teams at Pocahontas Swimming & Tennis Club and Lake Forest Swimming & Tennis Club. Under his coaching, Pocahontas went undefeated for 7 years and Lake Forest went undefeated for 3 years.

Armstrong was a member of Trinity English Lutheran Church in Fort Wayne, where he served as a long time Deacon and usher.

As a member of the Allen County Board of Library Trustees, Armstrong was involved in the construction a new main branch library. He resigned from this position in spring of 2008. At the April 24, 2008, meeting, the Allen County Board of Library Trustees passed Resolution No. 2008-5, "Resolution Honoring Robert E. Armstrong for Distinguished Service to the Library and the Community."

Armstrong also was a member or participant in numerous other community organizations including: American Legion Post 47; Fort Wayne American Red Cross Board (recipient of the Volunteer Red Cross Recognition Award); Fort Wayne Historical Society; Fort Wayne Urban League; Fort Wayne Zoological Society (charter member);Fort Wayne Administrative Association (past president); Allen County Republican Luncheon Club; and several Chamber of Commerce committees.

== Family ==
Bob Armstrong was married to wife, Nila, a kindergarten teacher on September 9, 1948. Nila Armstrong died June 29, 2012, in Fort Wayne, Indiana. The couple had three sons, including Daniel, who is the Robert A. Welch Professor of Chemistry and Biochemistry at the University of Texas at Arlington.

== See also ==
- List of mayors of Fort Wayne, Indiana

Preceded by Ivan Lebamoff	Mayor of Fort Wayne, Indiana; 1975–1979	Succeeded by Winfield Moses
