= Harry Baals =

American politician (1886–1954)

Mayor of Fort Wayne
- In office 1935–1948
- Preceded by: William J. Hosey
- Succeeded by: Henry Branning
- In office 1952 – May 9, 1954
- Preceded by: Henry Branning
- Succeeded by: Robert Meyers

Personal details
- Born: Harry William Baals; November 16, 1886 Fort Wayne, Indiana, U.S.
- Died: May 9, 1954 (aged 67) Fort Wayne, Indiana, U.S.
- Party: Republican
- Spouses: Minnie Marie Baals (m. 1909–1936): Irene Baals
- Children: 2

Harry William Baals (/bɔːlz/ BAWLZ; November 16, 1886 – May 9, 1954) was an American politician. A member of the Republican Party, he served as mayor of Fort Wayne, Indiana, from 1934 to 1947, and from 1951 until his death in 1954.

== Career ==
When Baals first took office, he consolidated city departments and lowered city tax rates. He launched construction of Fort Wayne's massive underground sewage system and had the city sewage treatment plant built, which is still being used today.

During the Great Depression, Baals directed war materials drives, upgraded city equipment and services, and broke ground for Baer Field, now Fort Wayne International Airport. In the 1930s, one of his major accomplishments was getting the old Nickel Plate Railroad tracks, running through downtown, to be elevated. This opened up the north side of the city for development.

Fort Wayne newscaster Bob Chase, of WOWO-AM, once mispronounced the mayor's name /beɪlz/. Baals personally called Chase to correct his pronunciation, saying, "son, this is your Mayor. I pronounce my name /bɔːlz/."

== Personal life and death ==
He had two children: Marceil D. Baals Smith and Donald Baals.

Baals's descendants have taken to pronouncing their name /beɪlz/.

Harry W. Baals died in 1954 of a kidney infection, while serving his fourth term as mayor. He is buried at Lindenwood Cemetery in Fort Wayne, Indiana.

== Legacy ==
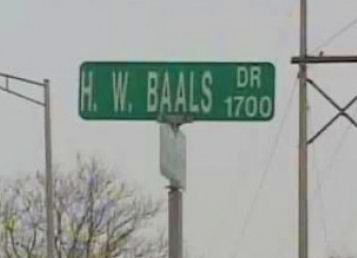
The new Harry Baals Dr. street sign

Harry Baals Drive was named in his honor. It extends east from Parnell Avenue, north and west of the St. Joseph River in Johnny Appleseed Park. In recent years, the double entendre arising from Baals's name has led Fort Wayne officials to shy away from naming streets and buildings after him. The aforementioned street has been renamed "H. W. Baals Drive" due to persistent theft of the street sign.

=== Proposed Harry Baals Government Center ===
In early 2011, Fort Wayne city officials invited people to suggest names for a new government building. The winner with 23,826 votes was the "Harry Baals Government Center," more than ten times the votes received by the closest contender. However, city officials almost immediately backed away from the name (many Americans pronounce Harry identically to hairy due to the Mary–marry–merry merger). The city's deputy mayor Beth Malloy said, "We realize that while Harry Baals was a respected mayor, not everyone outside of Fort Wayne will know that. We wanted to pick something that would reflect our pride in our community beyond the boundaries of Fort Wayne." It was later announced that the building would be named "Citizens Square."

Preceded by William J. Hosey	Mayor of Fort Wayne, Indiana; 1935–1948	Succeeded by Henry Branning
Preceded by Henry Branning	Mayor of Fort Wayne, Indiana; 1952–1954	Succeeded by Robert Meyers
