= List of mayors of Fort Wayne, Indiana =

Mayor of the City of Fort Wayne
- Flag of Fort Wayne, Indiana
- Incumbent; Sharon Tucker since April 23, 2024
- Term length: Four years, no limit
- Inaugural holder: George W. Wood
- Formation: 1840
- Website: Office of the Mayor

This is a list of mayors of Fort Wayne, Indiana, United States. The mayor is the chief executive of the city, charged with overseeing the operation of all local government departments. Mayoral terms are four years, with no limit on the number of terms an individual may be elected to.

== List ==
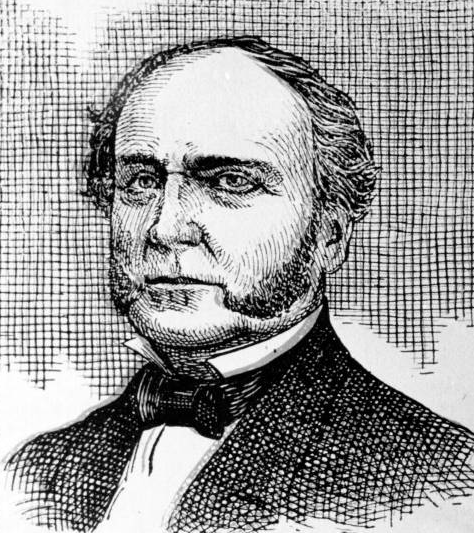
Lithograph of Fort Wayne's first mayor, George W. Wood

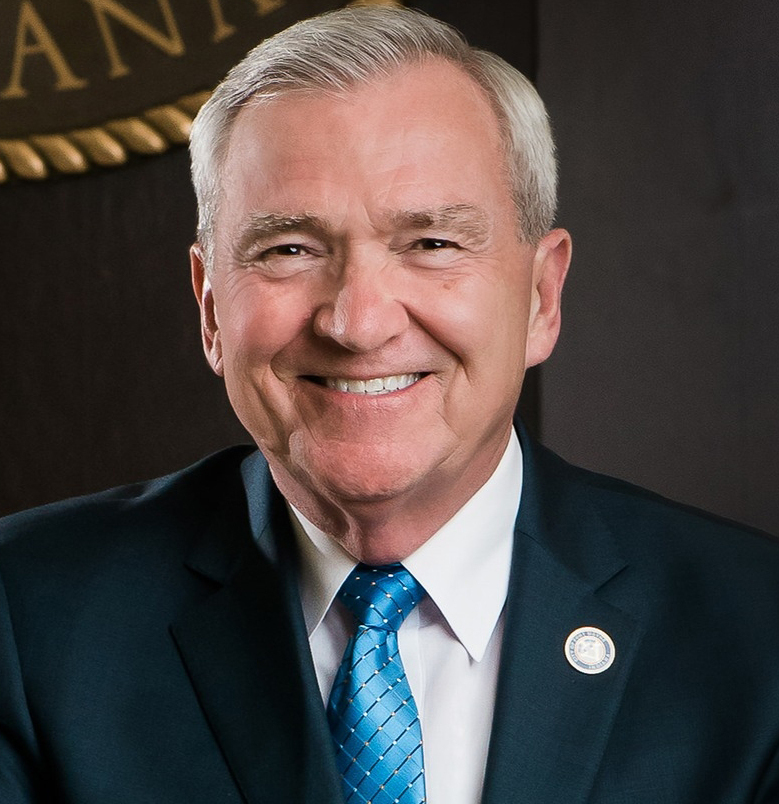
Tom Henry, Fort Wayne's 44th and longest-serving mayor

No.	Portrait	Mayor	Term start	Term end	Party
1		George W. Wood (1808–1871; aged 63)	May 1, 1840	July 5, 1841	Whig
2		Joseph Morgan (1795–1851; aged 56)	July 5, 1841	January 1843	Whig
3		Henry Lotz (1797–1845; aged 48)	January 1843	1845	Whig
4		John M. Wallace (1820–1866; aged 46)	1845	1846	Whig
5		Merchant W. Huxford (1798–1877; aged 79)	1846	1849	Democratic
6		William Stewart (1st) (1798–1873; aged 74)	1849	1852	Democratic
7		Philip G. Jones (1808–1859; aged 50)	1852	1853	Know Nothing
8		Charles Whitmore (1819–1892; aged 73)	1853	1855	Democratic
(6)		William Stewart (2nd) (1798–1873; aged 74)	1855	1857	Democratic
9		Samuel S. Morss (1811–1862; aged 51)	1857	1859	Know Nothing
10		Franklin P. Randall (1st) (1812–1892; aged 79)	1859	1865	Democratic
11		James Worden (1819–1884; aged 65)	1865	1866	Democratic
12		Benjamin Saunders (1810–1870; aged 60)	1866	1867	Democratic
13		Henry Sharp (1809–1900; aged 91)	1867	May 6, 1869	Republican
(10)		Franklin P. Randall (2nd) (1812–1892; aged 79)	May 6, 1869	1873	Democratic
14		Charles A. Zollinger (1st) (1838–1893; aged 55)	1873	May 7, 1885	Democratic
15		Charles F. Muhler (1841–1899; aged 58)	May 7, 1885	May 14, 1889	Democratic
16		Daniel L. Harding (1843–1912; aged 69)	May 14, 1889	May 7, 1891	Republican
(14)		Charles A. Zollinger (2nd) (1838–1893; aged 55)	May 7, 1891	December 27, 1893	Democratic
17		Henry P. Scherer (1st) (1855–1917; aged 61)	December 27, 1893	May 3, 1894	Democratic
18		Chauncey B. Oakley (1833–1903; aged 69)	May 3, 1894	May 7, 1896	Republican
(17)		Henry P. Scherer (2nd) (1855–1917; aged 61)	May 7, 1896	May 9, 1901	Democratic
19		Henry C. Berghoff (1856–1925; aged 69)	May 9, 1901	January 1, 1906	Democratic
20		William J. Hosey (1st) (1854–1937; aged 83)	January 1, 1906	1910	Democratic
21		Jesse Grice (1852–1915; aged 63)	1910	January 5, 1914	Republican
(20)		William J. Hosey (2nd) (1854–1937; aged 83)	January 5, 1914	1918	Democratic
22		W. Sherman Cutshall (1868–1939; aged 71)	1918	1922	Republican
(20)		William J. Hosey (3rd) (1854–1937; aged 83)	1922	January 4, 1926	Democratic
23		William C. Geake (1874–1965; aged 90)	January 4, 1926	1930	Republican
(20)		William J. Hosey (4th) (1854–1937; aged 83)	1930	1935	Democratic
24		Harry W. Baals (1st) (1886–1954; aged 67)	1935	January 1, 1948	Republican
25		Henry E. Branning Jr. (1890–1970; aged 80)	January 1, 1948	1952	Democratic
(24)		Harry W. Baals (2nd)^{[a]} (1886–1954; aged 67)	1952	May 9, 1954	Republican
26		Robert Meyers (1913–2007; aged 93)	May 9, 1954	December 31, 1959	Republican
27		Paul Mike Burns (1917–2011; aged 93)	January 1, 1960	December 31, 1963	Democratic
28		Harold S. Zeis (1912–1975; aged 62)	January 1, 1964	December 31, 1971	Republican
29		Ivan A. Lebamoff (1932–2006; aged 73)	January 1, 1972	December 31, 1975	Democratic
30		Robert E. Armstrong (1925–2008; aged 82)	January 1, 1976	December 31, 1979	Republican
31		Winfield Moses (1st)^{[b]} (born in 1943; age 83)	January 1, 1980	July 8, 1985	Democratic
32		Cosette Simon^{[c]} (born in 1953; age 73)	July 8, 1985	July 19, 1985	Democratic
(31)		Winfield Moses (2nd)^{[d]} (born in 1943; age 83)	July 20, 1985	December 31, 1987	Democratic
33		Paul Helmke (born in 1948; age 77)	January 1, 1988	December 31, 1999	Republican
34		Graham Richard (born in 1947; age 79)	January 1, 2000	December 31, 2007	Democratic
35		Tom Henry (1951–2024; aged 72)^{[e]}	January 1, 2008	March 28, 2024	Democratic
36		Karl Bandemer (born in 1945; age 81)	March 28, 2024	April 23, 2024	Democratic
37		Sharon Tucker (born in 1972; age 53–54)	April 23, 2024	Incumbent	Democratic

== Notes ==
- ^{a} Baals died of a kidney infection during his fourth term as mayor.
- ^{b} Moses resigned from office after pleading guilty to three misdemeanor violations of campaign finance laws.
- ^{c} City Controller Cosette Simon was appointed acting mayor for eleven days following Moses' resignation. She was Fort Wayne's first female mayor.
- ^{d} With 86 of 99 Allen County Democratic precinct committee members voting in a special caucus for his reinstatement, Moses was elected to complete his second term as mayor.
- ^{e} Henry died of stomach cancer during his fifth term as mayor.

== See also ==
- Mayoral elections in Fort Wayne, Indiana
