= Cosette Simon =

American politician and businessperson

32nd Mayor of Fort Wayne
- In office July 8, 1985 – July 19, 1985
- Preceded by: Winfield Moses
- Succeeded by: Winfield Moses

Personal details
- Born: Cosette Renee Simon; June 18, 1953 (age 73)
- Party: Democratic

Cosette Renee "Cosy" Simon (born June 18, 1953) is an American politician, business leader and philanthropist. As of June 2006, she was Vice President of Government and Industry Relations at insurance giant Swiss Re.

== Political career ==
Simon's political contribution is most notable individually as the first female mayor of Fort Wayne, Indiana. Previously the comptroller of the city, she held the position of mayor for 11 days in 1985, after being appointed to replace fellow Democrat Winfield Moses who was forced to resign due to statutory criminal activity in his re-election campaign. Her short term ended after Moses won re-election in a special election.

Simon also served as a former budget aide to Indiana Senator Evan Bayh. She also served under Bayh when he was governor of the state of Indiana as a budget official, where she developed the plan to reorganize the state's accounting systems and worked to redesign Indiana's public school system.

== Non-profit organizations ==
Simon served as executive director of the YWCA in Fort Wayne in the 1970s. In the late 1990s, she was the executive director of the League of American Bicyclists.

Preceded by Winfield Moses	Mayor of Fort Wayne, Indiana; 1985	Succeeded by Winfield Moses
