= Hisey =

Hisey is a surname. Notable people with the surname include:

- Dennis Hisey, American politician
- Rob Hisey (born 1984), Canadian ice hockey player

== See also ==
- Hosey
