= The Berghoff (restaurant) =

Restaurant in Chicago, Illinois, U.S.

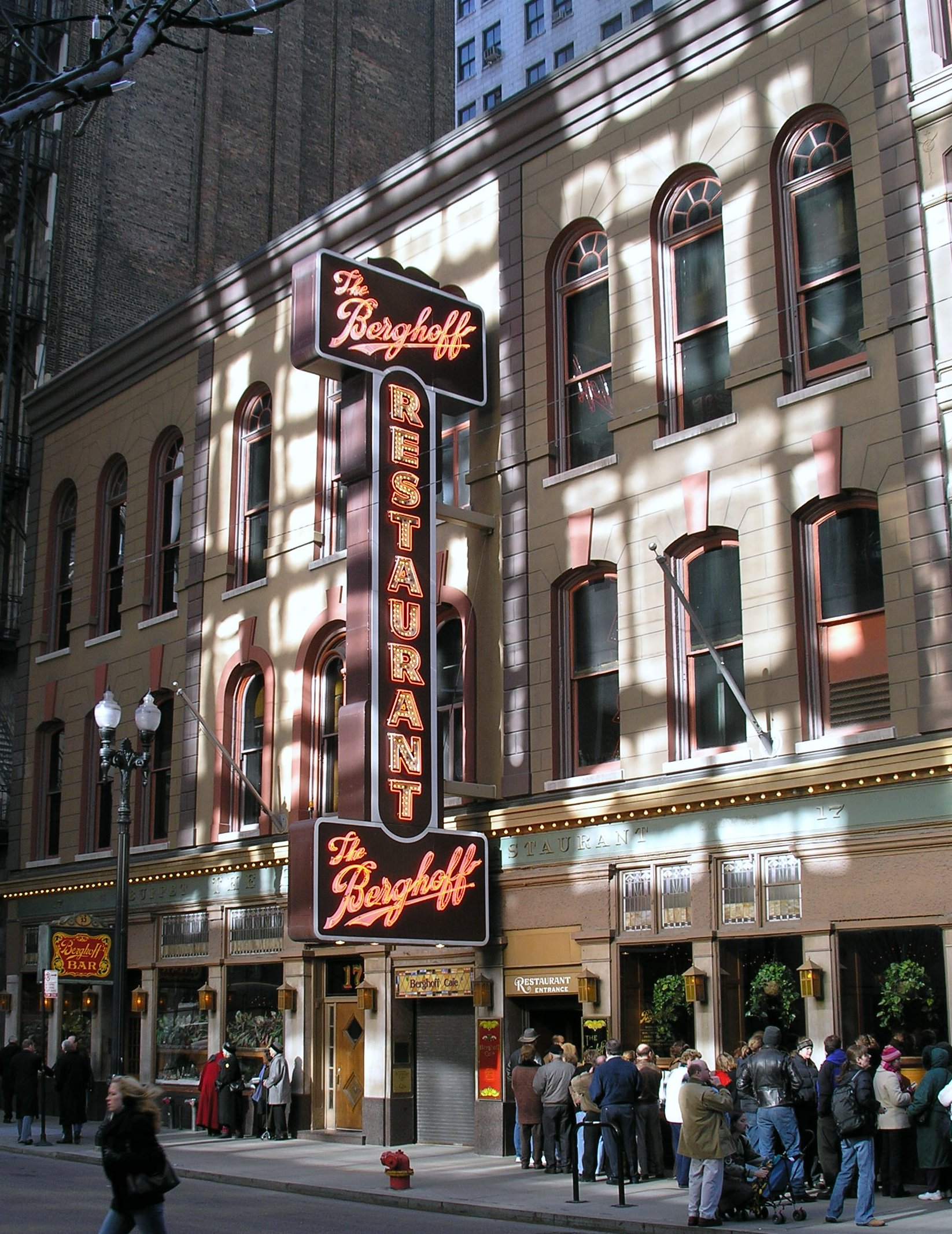
- The Berghoff Restaurant, Chicago
- Interactive map of The Berghoff
- The Berghoff The Berghoff (restaurant) (the United States)

Restaurant information
- Established: 1898
- Location: 17 West Adams Street, Chicago Loop, Illinois, United States
- Coordinates: 41°52′45.5″N 87°37′42.2″W

The Berghoff restaurant, at 17 West Adams Street, near the center of the Chicago Loop, was opened in 1898 by Herman Joseph Berghoff and has become a Chicago landmark. In 1999, The Berghoff won a James Beard Foundation Award in the "America's Classics" category, which honors legendary family-owned restaurants across the country.

The restaurant opened in 1898 as a saloon, but during Prohibition, when serving alcohol was illegal, it became known for its characteristic German food, such as sauerbraten, wiener schnitzel, creamed spinach, and apple strudel. The Berghoff was also known for its waiters, who were professionals, with formal cloth aprons, and remembered orders with no need to write them down. The restaurant followed a European system under which waiters purchased food from the kitchen via a token system and resold it to the customer. For much of its history, the Berghoff maintained a separate men's only bar. The segregation ended in 1969, when seven members of the National Organization for Women, followed a little later by the organization's head, Gloria Steinem, stood at the bar and demanded service.

== History ==
=== 1800s ===
Herman Berghoff immigrated to America from Dortmund, Germany, in 1870. Herman and his three brothers, Henry, Hubert, and Gustav, started brewing Berghoff's Beer in Fort Wayne, Indiana, in 1887. Herman wanted to expand the market for the family's beer and to do so he sold beer at the Chicago World's Fair of 1893.

The popularity of the beer inspired Herman to open a cafe to showcase Berghoff's Dortmunder-style beer which it sold for a nickel. Sandwiches were offered for free. The bar remained open even through the prohibition period by selling the legal near beer, which contained less than 0.5% alcohol, as well as a new line of Bergo soda pops, and expanded into a full-service restaurant. Berghoff root beer, a product of Bergo soda pops, is still popular today. After prohibition was repealed in 1933, The Berghoff was issued Chicago's Liquor License No. 1, a designation that has been honored by the city every year since.

=== 1900s ===
The founding Herman Berghoff died unexpectedly at home on December 31, 1934. The restaurant was run by two of Herman's seven children, Lewis Windthorst and Clement Anthony, who had both joined their father in the business prior to his death. Under their helm, Berghoff's grew into three restaurants under one roof: the original bar, a large two-room restaurant, and a more casual downstairs cafe, called the Annex, which was opened in 1939.

Lewis and Clement were active in the restaurant until about 1960. To succeed themselves, they brought in siblings from each family, one being third-generation Herman Berghoff (Lewis's son). Management styles differed and, in 1973, Herman withdrew and moved with his wife and four children to Stevensville, Michigan. However, in 1983 Herman was asked to return by the remaining Berghoff partners. He offered to buy them out, and became the sole owner and runner of the restaurant (with his wife Jan Berghoff) in 1986.

=== 2000s to present ===
Plate of food, 2023

The Berghoff closed on February 28, 2006, with the retirement of owners Herman and Jan Berghoff, then reopened on April 19, 2006, under the direction of their daughter, Carlyn. Some speculated that one purpose of this brief closure was to transition away from the use of unionized waiters. The restaurant's basement cafe reopened on April 18, 2006, during weekday lunch hours only, and was run by Carlyn Berghoff, Herman and Jan's daughter and the great-granddaughter of the founding Herman Joseph Berghoff. She also reopened the Berghoff's bar on May 23, 2006, under the new name "17/West at The Berghoff." At one point, Carlyn Berghoff converted the dining room of the restaurant into a private banquet hall called "The Century Room," however, after a year under new ownership, The Berghoff re-launched their full-service restaurant. The Berghoff Cafe at O'Hare Airport also remained open. Carlyn Berghoff also operated a catering company within the restaurant, resulting in the official name of the enterprise: Berghoff Catering & Restaurant Group.

In 2016, Carlyn Berghoff, CEO of Berghoff Catering & Restaurant Group, transitioned out of the restaurant by selling her assets to Berghoff Restaurant Company of Delaware, which is owned and operated by her brother, Pete Berghoff. July 1, 2016, marked the first day that Berghoff Restaurant Company of Delaware began managing operations at 17 West Adams. Currently, the Berghoff Company operates the full-service restaurant, public bar, cafe, and an on-site micro-brewery.

Due to the COVID-19 pandemic in Illinois, the Governor issued an executive order that effective on March 16, 2020 prohibited restaurants from serving dine-in patrons. After more than a year of remaining closed, The Berghoff reopened on July 12, 2021.

== Berghoff Beer ==
After surviving Prohibition by selling near beer, root beer and other sodas, Berghoff Brewery of Ft. Wayne, Indiana, was sold to the Falstaff company in 1954. The Joseph Huber Brewing Company then began brewing the Berghoff Beers in 1960 under contract with Berghoff Restaurant. The original Berghoff beer brand was purchased by General Beverage Distributors in 1994, owned by the Minkoff Family. In 2006, the Minkoff family sold its brewery and began using the Minhas Craft Brewery in Monroe, Wisconsin to brew Berghoff beer. In 2013, the label was relaunched by Ben Minkoff and brewed by the Stevens Point Brewery, located in Stevens Point, Wisconsin with year-round labels including Straight Up Hefeweizen, Dortwunder Lager, Sir Dunkle Dark Lager, and Reppin' Red Ale.

As part of a $2.2 million expansion project that started in 2018, Berghoff once again brews its own beer that is sold at the restaurant - this time onsite as a microbrewery named the Adams Street Brewery.

== Popular culture ==
In the film The Dark Knight, Gotham City police arrested gangsters in The Berghoff.

== See also ==
- Henry C. Berghoff
