= George W. Wood =

American politician (1808–1871)

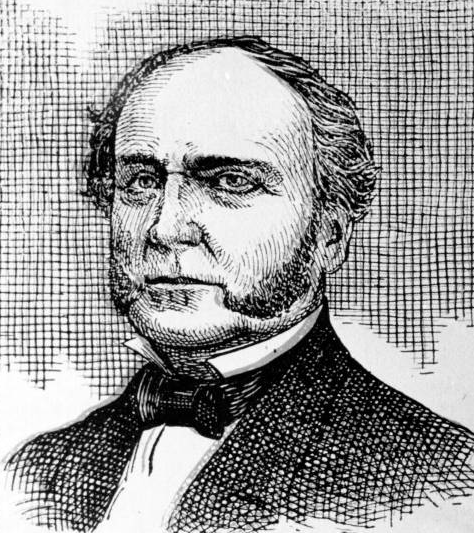

1st Mayor of Fort Wayne, Indiana
- In office March 1, 1840 – July 5, 1841
- Succeeded by: Joseph Morgan

Personal details
- Born: 1808 New York (state)
- Died: 1871 (aged 62–63) Fort Wayne, Indiana
- Profession: Newspaperman

George W. Wood (1808–1871) was an American politician and newspaperman. He was elected as the first mayor of Fort Wayne, Indiana in 1840. He served only 16 months before resigning on July 5, 1841. He continued in later life as a newspaperman in the Fort Wayne area.

== Early life ==
Wood was born in 1808 in New York state. He studied law, but then moved to Ann Arbor, Michigan in 1834 and then to the backcountry pioneer village of Fort Wayne in 1836.

== Newspaper life ==
Rather than being a lawyer, Wood joined with Thomas Tigar to work on the Fort Wayne Sentinel, which was founded in 1833. Four years after its founding, Wood bought ownership of the newspaper sometime around the Panic of 1837, and he promptly sold the paper in 1840 to I.D.G. Nelson.

== Brief political career ==
When Fort Wayne was incorporated as a city in 1840, George W. Wood was elected its first mayor.

== Continuing newspaper life ==
After being elected mayor, He bought another newspaper, the Fort Wayne Times. He was elected to serve a second one-year term as mayor in 1841, but halfway through the year he asked the council to allow him to return to his private affairs."

After resigning from mayor, Wood continued as a newspaperman. He established the Fort Wayne times, a Whig paper, in 1841, and sold it to Henry W. Jones in 1842. In March 1844, Wood started a campaign paper called the People's Press that merged into the Fort Wayne times and People's Press. This new paper ran from 1844 - 1848 Wood continued to own a stake in the Times on and off with John W. Dawson and T.N. Hood, during which time it was known sometimes as the Fort Wayne Daily Times. Wood retired from the newspaper partnership in 1854. Ultimately, the other owners merged the paper with the Fort Wayne Sentinel in 1866 when it became the Fort Wayne Times and Sentinel.

Preceded by Office established	Mayor of Fort Wayne, Indiana; 1840 - 1841	Succeeded by Joseph Morgan
