= Robert Meyers (politician) =

American politician

26th Mayor of Fort Wayne, Indiana
- In office 1954–1959
- Preceded by: Harry W. Baals
- Succeeded by: Mike Paul Burns

Personal details
- Born: December 23, 1913
- Died: March 26, 2007 (aged 93) Pittsburgh, Pennsylvania
- Party: Republican

Robert E. Meyers (December 23, 1913 – March 26, 2007) was an American politician and judge. He served as the 26th mayor of Fort Wayne, Indiana, succeeding Harry W. Baals, who died in office in 1954. A reluctant mayor, he served out the term of Baals after winning a special election and declined to run for reelection, citing the fact he went to school to be a lawyer, not a politician.

Meyers was a leader in the city's effort to annex suburban areas surrounding Fort Wayne. Under his leadership, in his years as mayor from 1954 to 1959, the city grew from 18 square miles (47 km^{2}) to 35 square miles (91 km^{2}) in area.

In later life, Meyers served as an Allen County Superior Court Judge from 1971 until he retired from public life a second time, in 1985.

== Legacy ==
Robert E. Meyers Park, part of Fort Wayne's Harrison Square development, was dedicated in Meyers' honor on August 14, 2009. The Meyers family contributed $300,000 for completion of the park.

Preceded by Harry W. Baals	Mayor of Fort Wayne, Indiana; 1954–1959	Succeeded by Mike Paul Burns
