= Charles A. Zollinger =

American Colonel (1838–1893)

Charles Zollinger
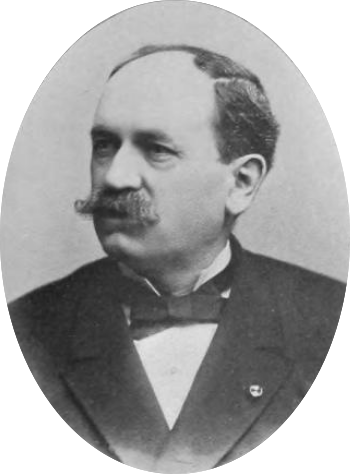

16th Mayor of Fort Wayne
- In office 1873–1885
- Preceded by: Franklin P. Randall
- Succeeded by: Daniel L. Harding
- In office May 7, 1891 – December 27, 1893
- Preceded by: Charles F. Muhler
- Succeeded by: Henry P. Scherer

Personal details
- Born: Charles Augustus Zollinger; December 9, 1838 Wiesbaden, German Confederation
- Died: December 27, 1893 (aged 55)
- Party: Democratic

Military service
- Allegiance: (United States) United States; Union
- Branch/service: Union Army
- Rank: Colonel
- Battles/wars: American Civil War: Battle of Stones River Battle of Shiloh Battle of Franklin Battle of Nashville.

Charles Augustus Zollinger (December 9, 1838, in Wiesbaden, German Confederation – December 27, 1893) was an American Civil War hero on the Union side, and later served six terms as Mayor of Fort Wayne, Indiana. As a Colonel in the Union Army, he led troops into battle at Murfreesboro, Shiloh, Franklin and Nashville. Born in Wiesbaden in the German Confederation to German parents of Swiss heritage, he emigrated along with his family in 1848, arriving in New York before settling in Sandusky, Ohio, and soon after moving to Marion, near Fort Wayne, Indiana.

Zollinger, a Democrat, was first elected Mayor of Fort Wayne in 1873, and served until 1885. He was succeeded by Charles F. Muhler, a Republican. Zollinger returned for a sixth and final term in 1891, but died in office on December 27, 1893, and was succeeded by Henry P. Scherer.

== See also ==
- List of mayors of Fort Wayne, Indiana
