= Merchant W. Huxford =

American physician and politician (1798–1877)

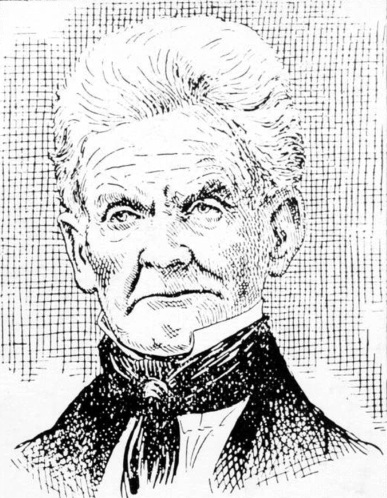
- 1839 drawing of Huxford by Bert J. Griswold

5th Mayor of Fort Wayne, Indiana
- In office May 1846 – 1849
- Preceded by: John M. Wallace
- Succeeded by: William Stewart

Personal details
- Born: Merchant Wayne Huxford; 1798 Conway, Massachusetts, US
- Died: 1877 (aged 78–79) Fort Wayne, Indiana, US
- Resting place: Lindenwood Cemetery
- Occupation: Physician, politician

Merchant Wayne Huxford (1798 – 1877) was an American medical doctor and politician. He served as the 5th mayor of Fort Wayne, Indiana.

== Biography ==
Huxford was born in 1798, in Conway, Massachusetts. He married Sarah Reid (née Hauk) Huxford, together moving to Fort Wayne, Indiana in 1833. He likely moved to Fort Wayne due to economic opportunities brought by the completion of the Wabash and Erie Canal. In Fort Wayne, he practiced medicine and operated a drug store, making him the city's first druggist and an early physician. He was the senior warden of Christ Church. On May 27, 1839, he helped found the Trinity Episcopal Church and was a vestryman.

After the resignation of John M. Wallace, Huxford became the 5th mayor of Fort Wayne. He served from May 1846 to 1849, completing the remainder of Wallace's term, then served three more one-year terms. He was Fort Wayne's first mayor to complete a full term without resigning or being removed from office, and was at the time its longest-serving mayor. He oversaw the city's early growth, with ports being created along the Wabash and Erie Canal. The population grew to 4,000 during his tenure. As a result, he funded city projects to manage the growth, such as a new firehouse.

Huxford left office whilst the city's first railroad was being built. He then retired. He remained active in Fort Wayne, being the sole founder of the Allen County Agricultural and the Allen County Horticultural Societies. He died in 1877, aged 78 or 79, in Fort Wayne. He was buried at Lindenwood Cemetery.

Huxford owned a large property, being situated beside the St. Joseph River and Spy Run Creek. He built a house on the property c. 1854, with it being believed that he used material from Fort Wayne stockade in its construction. By 1958, his house had been turned into apartments. Around 1960, a garage and gas station were built on where his front yard sat.

Preceded by John M. Wallace	Mayor of Fort Wayne, Indiana; 1846 - 1849	Succeeded by William Stewart
