= Merchant, Virginia =

Unincorporated community in Virginia, United States

Coordinates: 36°40′42″N 77°57′07″W

Merchant is an unincorporated community located in Brunswick County, in the U.S. state of Virginia.
