= William J. Hosey =

American politician

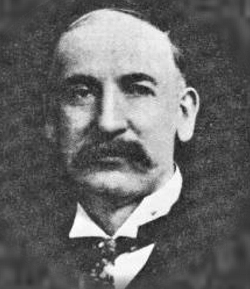

20th Mayor of Fort Wayne, Indiana
- In office 1906 – 1910; 1914 – 1918; 1922 – 1926; 1930 – 1935
- Preceded by: 1st Term: Henry C. Berghoff; 2nd Term: Jesse Grice; 3rd Term: Sherman Cutshall; 4th Term: William C. Geake
- Succeeded by: 1st Term: Jesse Grice; 2nd Term: Sherman Cutshall; 3rd Term: William C. Geake; 4th Term: Harry W. Baals

Personal details
- Born: May 5, 1854 New Orleans, Louisiana
- Died: September 10, 1937 (aged 83) Fort Wayne, Indiana
- Party: Democratic
- Spouse: Mary (McCarthy) Hosey

William J. Hosey (May 5, 1854 – September 10, 1937) was an American politician and the 20th Mayor of Fort Wayne, Indiana. Between 1906 and 1935 he served four non-consecutive terms of office.

== History ==
He was born in New Orleans, Louisiana a year after his parents, Michael and Jean Frayne Hosey, immigrated to the United States from County Wexford in Ireland. In 1858, the four-year-old Hosey moved with his family to Mount Vernon, Ohio, where his father took a job as a gardener on the estate of Colonel Jesse P. Buckingham. (This may instead have been the estate of future General Catharinus P. Buckingham.)

At age 13, three years after his father died from malaria, extreme poverty forced William Hosey to drop out of a Catholic grammar school to work at Mount Vernon-based C & C Cooper Company machine shop. Five years later, William, his mother and older brother Lawrence moved to Fort Wayne, where William took a job as a machinist for the Pennsylvania Railroad. Lawrence died of pneumonia two years later. William worked at the railroad for 34 years.

During this time, William attended night classes to finish his education. He studied literature and philosophy.

Preceded by Henry C. Berghoff	Mayor of Fort Wayne, Indiana; 1906 — 1910	Succeeded by Jesse Grice
Preceded by Jesse Grice	Mayor of Fort Wayne, Indiana; 1912 — 1918	Succeeded by Sherman Cutshall
Preceded by Sherman Cutshall	Mayor of Fort Wayne, Indiana; 1922 — 1926	Succeeded by William C. Geake
Preceded by William C. Geake	Mayor of Fort Wayne, Indiana; 1930 — 1935	Succeeded by Harry W. Baals
