= St. Mary's Catholic Church (Fort Wayne, Indiana) =

Historic church in Indiana, United States

- Formerly listed on the U.S. National Register of Historic Places
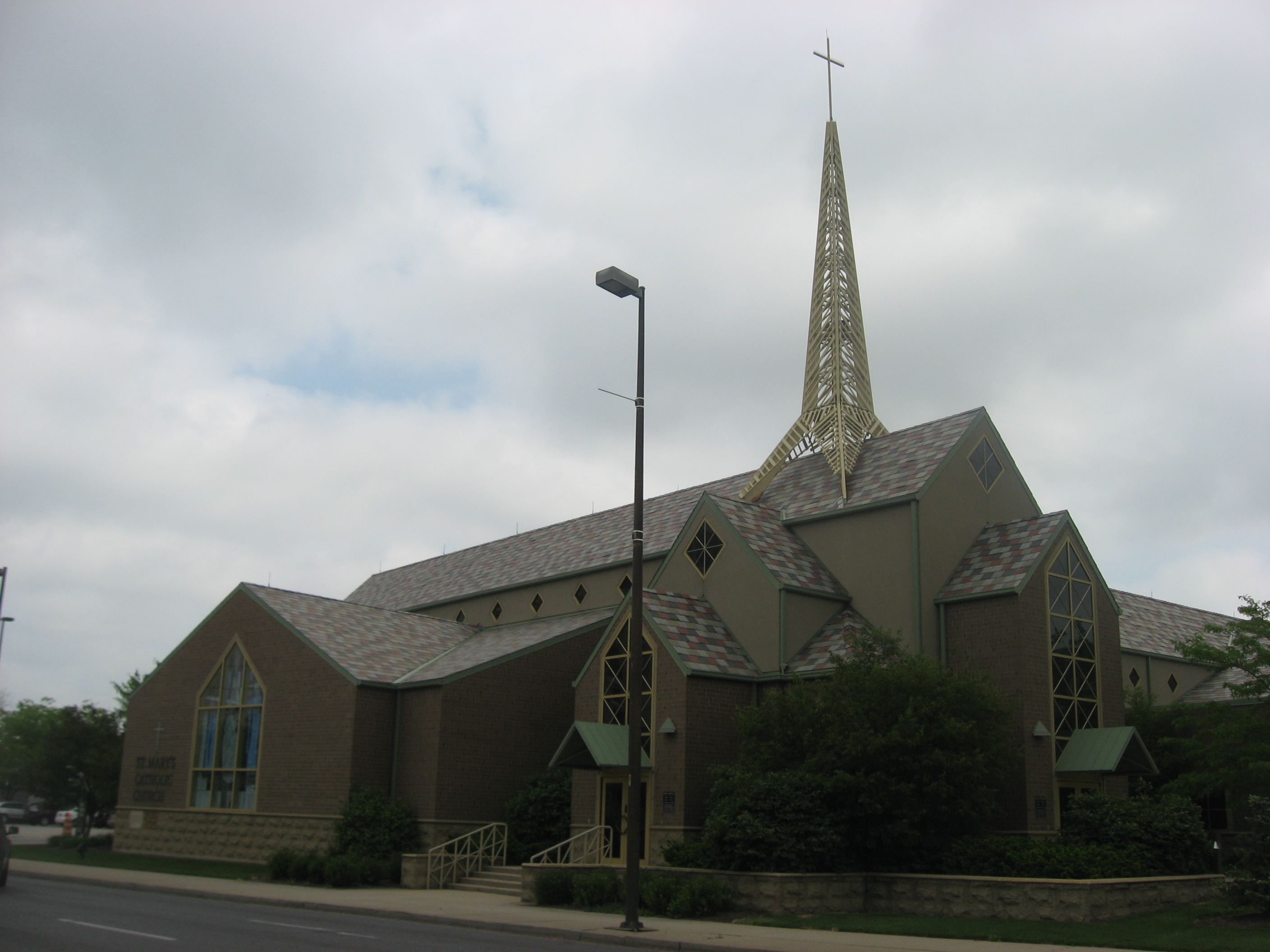
- The new St. Mary's Catholic Church, May 2012

- Location within Indiana Location within the United States
- Location: 1101 S. Lafayette St., Fort Wayne, Indiana
- Coordinates: 41°04′36″N 85°08′00″W
- Area: 1 acre (0.40 ha)
- Built: 1886-1887
- Architect: Lane, Samuel W.; Griffith & Lane
- Architectural style: Gothic Revival
- NRHP reference No.: 84000483

Significant dates
- Added to NRHP: December 27, 1984
- Removed from NRHP: September 13, 1993

St. Mary's Catholic Church is a parish of the Roman Catholic Church located at Fort Wayne, Indiana, in the Diocese of Fort Wayne–South Bend.

The current parish church, dedicated in 1999, is the fourth building to serve in that role. The congregation was founded in 1848 to serve German immigrants, previously served by St. Augustine's Church (the present-day Cathedral of the Immaculate Conception). A larger church was built in 1858 but was destroyed by fire. This was replaced by a landmark brick and sandstone church in 1886, but this was destroyed after being struck by lightning in 1993.

== 1886 church ==
The church was built in 1886–1887, and was a red brick and sandstone Gothic Revival style church. It measured approximately 195 feet long and 68 feet wide, and had a traditional cruciform plan. The main steeple in the middle, including the cross had a height of 237 feet. The front facade featured three projecting towers. Also on the property were the contributing rectory and boiler building.

It was listed on the National Register of Historic Places in 1984. It was destroyed by fire September 2, 1993 after being struck by lightning, and was consequently delisted later that year.
