= John M. Wallace (soldier) =

American soldier and judge (1820–1866)

John Milton Wallace (January 2, 1820 – August 25, 1866) was an American soldier and judge. He served as state Adjutant General at the start of the American Civil War.

Wallace was born in Brookville, Indiana, but his family moved to Marion, Indiana, where he remained and became a lawyer. In 1841, he married Mariam C. Weeks; they had four children together. Wallace served as Grant County judge. He was the brother of David Wallace, state governor from 1837 to 1840, and John served as his private secretary.

Wallace moved to Fort Wayne, where he was elected Mayor in 1845, after Mayor Henry Lotz was forced out of office. Wallace served as Mayor of Fort Wayne from 1845 to 1846, when he resigned and moved to Grant County.

When the Mexican–American War began in 1846, Wallace raised and commanded his own company, named the "Marion Guards". It was one of 10 companies accepted in May 1847 by Indiana's adjutant general to proceed to Galveston, Texas, where they formed a regiment under Brig. Gen. Joseph Lane.

Wallace was appointed by Governor Oliver P. Morton to the position of Indiana Adjutant General on April 25, 1861, replacing his nephew Lew Wallace. On May 3, Wallace was commissioned colonel of the 12th Indiana Infantry Regiment. He resigned his commission on August 6, 1861, due to chronic bowel problems, which prevented him from riding a horse. Wallace subsequently served as a paymaster for the U.S. Army volunteer forces at the rank of major, from August 22, 1861, until resigning in July 1862.

Wallace died at Marion, Indiana on August 25, 1866.
