= The Kingston Trio discography =

Cataloging of published recordings by The Kingston Trio

The Kingston Trio's discography is large and diverse, covering over 50 years and many record labels. Their early—and primary—output was virtually all recorded on Capitol Records and produced by Voyle Gilmore. After their release from Capitol in 1964, they recorded four albums for Decca.

== Albums ==
=== Studio albums ===
Title	Album details	Peak chart positions	Certifications
Title	Album details	US	Certifications
The Kingston Trio	Released: June 1, 1958; Label: Capitol	1	RIAA: Gold
At Large	Released: June 1, 1959; Label: Capitol	1	RIAA: Gold
Here We Go Again!	Released: October 19, 1959; Label: Capitol	1	RIAA: Gold
Sold Out	Released: April 4, 1960; Label: Capitol	1	RIAA: Gold
String Along	Released: July 1960; Label: Capitol	1	RIAA: Gold
The Last Month of the Year	Released: October 3, 1960; Label: Capitol	11	
Make Way	Released: January 30, 1961; Label: Capitol	2	
Goin' Places	Released: June 5, 1961; Label: Capitol	3	
Close-Up	Released: October 1961; Label: Capitol	3	
Something Special	Released: July 1962; Label: Capitol	10	
New Frontier	Released: November 1962; Label: Capitol	20	
The Kingston Trio #16	Released: March 1963; Label: Capitol	30	
Sunny Side!	Released: July 1963; Label: Capitol	7	
Time to Think	Released: December 1963; Label: Capitol	18	
The Kingston Trio (Nick Bob John)	Released: December 7, 1964; Label: Decca	53	
Stay Awhile	Released: May 1965; Label: Decca	126	
Somethin' Else	Released: November 1965; Label: Decca	—	
Children of the Morning	Released: May 1966; Label: Decca	—	
The World Needs a Melody (released as The New Kingston Trio)	Released: April 1973; Label: Longines Symphonette Society	—	
Aspen Gold	Released: May 1979; Label: Nautilus Records	—	
Looking for the Sunshine	Released: 1983; Label: Xeres	—	
The Lost 1967 Album: Rarities Vol. 1	Released: July 2, 2007; Label: Collectors' Choice Music	—	
Turning Like Forever: Rarities Vol. 2	Released: July 29, 2008; Label: Collectors' Choice Music	—	
Long Train of Dreams	Released: 2021; Label: Trident	—	

=== Live albums ===
Title	Album details	Peak chart positions	Certifications
Title	Album details	US	Certifications
...from the "Hungry i"	Released: January 5, 1959; Label: Capitol	2	RIAA: Gold
Stereo Concert	Released: March 16, 1959; Label: Capitol	15	
College Concert	Released: February 1962; Label: Capitol	3	
Back in Town	Released: June 1964; Label: Capitol	22	
Once Upon a Time	Released: June 1969; Label: Tetragrammaton	163	
Everybody's Talking	Released: 1989; Label: Folk Era	—	
An Evening with The Kingston Trio	Released: 1994; Label: Folk Era	—	
Live at Newport	Released: 1994; Label: Vanguard	—	
Live at the Crazy Horse	Released: 1994; Label: Silverwolf	—	
Live! at the Historic Yuma Theater	Released: 2006; Label: Kingston Trio LLC	—	
The Final Concert	Released: April 16, 2007; Label: Collectors' Choice Music	—	
Live at the Santa Monica Civic Auditorium	Released: November 20, 2007; Label: Collectors' Choice Music	—	
Twice Upon a Time	Released: February 12, 2008; Label: Collectors' Choice Music	—	
On a Cold Winter's Night	Released: 2008; Label: Kingston Trio LLC	—	
Flashback! 1963	Released: 2009; Label: Folk Era	—	
Above The Purple Onion	Released: 2010; Label: Kingston Trio LLC	—	

=== Select compilation albums ===
Title	Album details	Peak chart positions	Certifications
Title	Album details	US	Certifications
The Kingston Trio Encores	Released: 1961; Label: Capitol	—	
The Best of the Kingston Trio	Released: 1962; Label: Capitol	37	RIAA: Gold
The Best of the Kingston Trio Vol. 2	Released: 1965; Label: Capitol	—	
The Best of the Kingston Trio Vol. 3	Released: 1966; Label: Capitol	—	
Capitol Collectors Series	Released: 1990; Label: Capitol	—	
Treasure Chest	Released: 1993; Label: Folk Era	—	
The Capitol Years	Released: 1995; Label: Capitol	—	
The Lost Masters 1969–1972	Released: 1997; Label: Folk Era	—	
The Kingston Trio: The Guard Years	Released: 1997; Label: Bear Family	—	
The Best of the Decca Years	Released: 1998; Label: MCA	—	
The Kingston Trio: The Stewart Years	Released: 2000; Label: Bear Family	—	
The Decca Years	Released: 2002; Label: Folk Era	—	
Once Again	Released: 2004; Label: Folk Era	—	

== Singles ==
Title	Year	Peak chart positions		Album
Title	Year	US	CAN	Album
"Scarlet Ribbons"	1958	—	—	The Kingston Trio
"Tom Dooley"	1958	1	1	The Kingston Trio
"Raspberries, Strawberries"	1959	70	22	Sold Out
"The Tijuana Jail"	1959	12	2	Non-album single
"M.T.A."	1959	15	15	At Large
"A Worried Man"	1959	20	15	Here We Go Again!
"CooCoo-U"	1959	98	—	Non-album single
"El Matador"	1960	32	—	Sold Out
"Bad Man Blunder"	1960	37	—	String Along
"Everglades"	1960	60	35	String Along
"You're Gonna Miss Me"	1961	—	—	Goin' Places
"Coming from the Mountains"	1961	—	—	Close-Up
"Where Have All the Flowers Gone?"	1961	21	15	College Concert
"Scotch and Soda"	1962	81	—	The Kingston Trio
"Jane, Jane, Jane"	1962	93	—	Something Special
"One More Town"	1962	97	—	Something Special
"Greenback Dollar"	1962	21	17	New Frontier
"Reverend Mr. Black"	1963	8	7	The Kingston Trio #16
"Desert Pete"	1963	33	—	Sunny Side!
"Ally Ally Oxen Free"	1963	61	—	Time to Think
"Last Night I Had the Strangest Dream"	1964	—	—	Time to Think
"Seasons in the Sun"	1964	—	—	Time to Think
"My Ramblin' Boy"	1964	—	—	The Kingston Trio (Nick Bob John)
"I'm Going Home"	1964	—	—	The Kingston Trio (Nick Bob John)
"Yes I Can Feel It"	1965	—	—	Stay Awhile
"Parchment Farm Blues"	1965	—	—	Somethin' Else
"Norwegian Wood (This Bird Has Flown)"	1966	—	—	Children of the Morning
"The Spinnin' of the World"	1966	—	—	Children of the Morning
"Lock All the Windows"	1966	—	—	Children of the Morning

== Video releases ==
- The Kingston Trio and Friends Reunion (WhiteStar Video, 1982)
- An Evening with The Kingston Trio (Rhino Video, 1989)
- The Kingston Trio 45th Anniversary Tribute Concert (EDI, 2002)
- Wherever We May Go (Shout Factory, 2006)
- The Kingston Trio: Fifty Years Of Having Fun (EDI, 2006)
- Live at the Yuma (Kingston Trio Productions, 2007)
- Young Men in a Hurry [TV Series Pilot] (Paramount, 2007)
