= The Capitol Years (The Kingston Trio album) =

Compilation album by The Kingston Trio
- Released: 1995
- Recorded: February 10, 1957 – April 2, 1964
- Genre: Folk
- Length: 300:56
- Label: Capitol
- Producer: Voyle Gilmore; Ron Furmanek (reissue)

The Kingston Trio chronology
Live at the Crazy Horse (1994)	The Capitol Years (1995)	The Lost Masters 1969–1972 (1997)

The Capitol Years is a compilation album of the American folk music group the Kingston Trio's recordings from their time with the Capitol Records label.

== History ==
The box set was released in 1995 and contains 4 discs, featuring, in total, 107 digitally remastered songs, 33 of which were previously unreleased. The compilation also includes songs recorded by Kingston Trio-related groups, such as Dave Guard's pre and post-Trio groups, Dave Guard and the Calypsonians and The Whiskeyhill Singers, along with John Stewart's pre-Kingston group, The Cumberland Three.

The set also included a comprehensive 48-page booklet, complete with detailed track-by-track annotation.

== Reception ==
Professional ratings
Review scores
Source	Rating
Allmusic	4.5/5 stars

Allmusic music critic Richie Unterberger praised the compilation with reservations, writing "Collectors will appreciate the inclusion of rarities by related groups like Dave Guard and the Calypsonians... Dave Guard and the Whiskeyhill Singers... the Cumberland Three... But this is way too much for anyone but the fanatic... for all its historical significance, the execution is usually far too sterile and whitebread to appeal to contemporary listeners, unless it's on purely nostalgic grounds."

== Track listing ==
All songs performed by The Kingston Trio, unless otherwise noted.

Disc one

1. "Run Joe" (Dave Guard and the Calypsonians) – 2:32
2. "Fast Freight" (Dave Guard And The Calypsonians) (Terry Gilkyson) – 5:13
3. "Tom Dooley" (Alan Lomax, Frank Warner) – 3:01
4. "Sloop John B" (Traditional) – 3:29
5. "Dodi Lii" (Traditional, Guard, Reynolds, Shane) – 2:10
6. "New York Girls" (Burl Ives) – 2:32
7. "They Call The Wind Maria" (Alan Jay Lerner, Frederick Loewe) – 4:32
8. "Shady Grove/Lonesome Traveller" (Traditional) – 3:14
9. "Little Maggie" (Dave Guard) – 2:26
10. "Bay of Mexico" (Traditional) – 3:34
11. "Across The Wide Missouri" – 3:54
12. "Scotch And Soda" (Guard) – 2:15
13. "Pay Me My Money Down" – 2:18
14. "The Tijuana Jail" (Denny Thompson) – 2:48
15. "M.T.A." (Bess Lomax Hawes, Jacqueline Steiner) – 3:13
16. "All My Sorrows" (Arranged by Dave Guard, Nick Reynolds, Bob Shane) – 2:45
17. "Good News" (Lou Gottlieb) – 1:58
18. "Remember the Alamo" (Jane Bowers) – 2:58
19. "Molly Dee" (John Stewart) – 1:43
20. "The Unfortunate Miss Bailey" (Traditional, Lou Gottlieb) – 2:08
21. "Sail Away Ladies" (Traditional) – 2:28
22. "A Worried Man" (Traditional, Tom Glazer, Guard) – 2:51
23. "The Kingston Trio Sings For 7-UP (Spot #1)" – 2:22
24. "The Kingston Trio Sings For 7-UP (Spot #2)" – 2:02

Disc two

1. "El Matador" (Jane Bowers, Irving Burgess) – 2:27
2. "The Mountains O'Mourne" (Houston Collisson, Percy French) - 2:49
3. "Home From The Hill" - 2:20
4. "The World's Last Authentic Playboy" (Bill Loughborough, David "Buck" Wheat) - 2:39
5. "Raspberries, Strawberries" (Will Holt) - 2:11
6. "Bimini" (Mark McIntyre, B. Olofson) - 2:53
7. "Green Grasses" (John Stewart) - 2:21
8. "With You, My Johnny" (Traditional, Guard, Reynolds, Shane) – 2:23
9. "Bad Man's Blunder" (Lee Hays, Cisco Houston) – 2:36
10. "The Escape Of Old John Webb" (Tom Drake) – 2:29
11. "Colorado Trail" (Lee Hays, Carl Sandburg) – 2:48
12. "Buddy Better Get On Down The Line" (Bowers, Guard) – 2:20
13. "Coast Of California" (Bowers, Guard) – 2:36
14. "Bye Bye Thou Little Tiny Child" (Dave Guard) – 2:57
15. "A Round About Christmas" (Reynolds) – 1:29
16. "Come All Ye Fair And Tender Ladies" (Traditional, Dave Guard, Gretchen Guard) – 2:50
17. "Bonny Hielan' Laddie" (Dave Guard, Joe Hickerson) – 2:45
18. "The River Is Wide" (Traditional, Reynolds) – 3:36
19. "Don't You Weep, Mary" – 2:13
20. "Sea Fever" (Bowers, Burgess) – 2:56
21. "The Golden Spike" (Traditional) – 1:47
22. "Mary Was Pretty" – 2:01
23. "The Wines Of Madeira" (Traditional) – 2:59
24. "Senora" (Bowers, Guard) – 2:56
25. "Adieu To My Island" – 2:41
26. "It Was A Very Good Year" (Ervin Drake) – 3:20
27. "You're Gonna Miss Me" (John Cohen, Dave Guard, Tom Paley, Mike Seeger) – 2:42
28. "The Bonnie Ship, The Diamond" (The Whiskeyhill Singers) – 2:30
29. "Come Along Julie" (The Cumberland Three) – 2:29

Disc three

1. "Come From The Mountains" - 2:23
2. "Oh, Sail Away" (John Phillips, Dick Weisman) – 3:11
3. "Take Her Out Of Pity" (Arranged by Reynolds, Shane, Stewart - 2:36
4. "The Whistling Gypsy" (Leo Maguire) - 3:03
5. "Nothing More To Look Forward To" - 2:26
6. "Weeping Willow" (Arranged by Reynolds, Shane, Stewart) - 3:19
7. "Jesse James" (Arranged by Reynolds, Shane, Stewart) - 2:36
8. "Where Have All the Flowers Gone" (Pete Seeger, Joe Hickerson) – 3:02
9. "Little Light" (Arranged by Reynolds, Shane, Stewart) – 3:00
10. "Chilly Winds" (Phillips, Stewart) – 2:38
11. "Oh Miss Mary" (Phillips, Stewart) – 3:05
12. "Roddy McCorley" (Traditional) – 2:52
13. "500 Miles" (Hedy West) – 3:02
14. "Goin' Away For To Leave You" (Phillips) – 2:29
15. "Old Kentucky Land" – 1:59
16. "Rocky" – 2:18
17. "One More Town" (Stewart) – 3:09
18. "Away Rio" – 2:53
19. "Pullin' Away" – 3:14
20. "All The Good Times" – 3:20
21. "Darlin' Are You Dreaming" – 3:01
22. "Allentown Jail" – 2:28
23. "Greenback Dollar" (Hoyt Axton, Kennard Ramsey) – 2:43
24. "Honey, Are You Mad At Your Man" (Reynolds, Shane, Stewart) – 2:09
25. "Long Black Veil" (Danny Dill, Marijohn Wilkin) – 2:27
26. "Genny Glenn" (Reynolds, Shane, Stewart) – 2:32
27. "The First Time (Ever I Saw Your Face)" (Ewan MacColl) – 2:50
28. "The New Frontier" (Stewart) – 2:21

Disc four

1. "The Reverend Mr. Black" - 3:07
2. "Road To Freedom" - 2:17
3. "River Run Down" - 2:54
4. "One More Round" - 2:49
5. "Run The Ridges" - 2:45
6. "Love Has Gone" - 3:17
7. "Try To Remember" - 3:09
8. "Mark Twain" - 2:37
9. "Desert Pete" - 2:37
10. "Ballad of the Tresher" - 3:07
11. "Two-Ten, Six-Eighteen" - 2:55
12. "Those Who Are Wise" - 2:51
13. "Rider" - 2:53
14. "The Patriot Game" - 2:45
15. "Coal Tattoo" - 2:33
16. "Hobo's Lullaby" - 3:14
17. "Seasons in the Sun" - 2:53
18. "Song For a Friend" - 2:35
19. "Four Strong Winds" - 2:53
20. "Last Night I Had the Strangest Dream" - 2:08
21. "Ann" - 2:48
22. "Let's Get Together" - 2:30
23. "Hard, Ain't It Hard" - 3:37
24. "Reuben James" - 3:20
25. "Pullin' Away" - 4:13
26. "Farewell Captain" - 5:05

== Personnel ==
- Dave Guard – Vocals, Banjo, Guitar
- Bob Shane – Vocals, Banjo, Guitar
- Nick Reynolds – Vocals, Tenor Guitar, Bongos, Conga
- David "Buck" Wheat – Bass, Guitar
- Elmer "Buzz" Wheeler – Bass
- The Cumberland Three
