= Twice Upon a Time (The Kingston Trio album) =

Live album by The Kingston Trio
- Released: February 12, 2008
- Recorded: July 31 – November 1966
- Genre: Folk
- Label: RichKat Records through Collectors' Choice
- Producer: Frank Werber, Ron Furmanek (Compilation Producer)

The Kingston Trio chronology
Live at the Santa Monica Civic Auditorium (2007)	Twice Upon a Time (2008)	Turning Like Forever: Rarities Vol. 2 (2008)

Twice Upon a Time is a live album by the American folk music group The Kingston Trio, recorded in 1966 and released in 2008 (see 2008 in music).

== History ==
After deciding to disband after a final tour, the trio recorded numerous performances in order to release a final live album. Their current label, Decca Records, declined to release Once Upon a Time. It wasn't until 1969 that it was eventually released on Tetragrammaton Records. This compilation consists of recordings from their final performances at the Sahara Tahoe hotel.

The set list is nearly identical to Once Upon a Time. A bonus video in included.

== Reception ==
Professional ratings
Review scores
Source	Rating
Allmusic	3.5/5 stars

The Allmusic review commented on the similarity with Once Upon a Time and noted the minor differences between the two releases and concluded this release was for "die-hard collectors only."

== Track listing ==
1. "Introduction" – 0:38
2. "Hard Travelin'" (Woody Guthrie) – 2:21
3. "Intro to M.T.A." – 2:55
4. "M.T.A." (Bess Lomax Hawes, Jacqueline Steiner) -2:58
5. "Intro to Where I'm Bound" – 0:46
6. "Where I'm Bound" (Tom Paxton) – 3:01
7. "They Call the Wind Maria" (Alan Jay Lerner, Frederick Loewe) – 3:46
8. "Intro to The Merry Minuet" – 0:14
9. "The Merry Minuet" (Harnick) – 2:20
10. "Intro to Hanna Lee" – 0:17
11. "Hanna Lee" (Stan Jones, Richard Mills) – 2:51
12. "Greenback Dollar" (Hoyt Axton, Kennard Ramsey) – 3:00
13. "Intro to Thirsty Boots" – 5:18
14. "Thirsty Boots" (Anderson) - 4:51
15. "Rovin' Gambler/This Train" (Samuel F. Omar) – 1:57
16. "Intro to Tom Dooley" – 1:04
17. "Tom Dooley" (Alan Lomax, Frank Warner) – 3:00
18. "Intro to Reuben James" – 1:16
19. "Reuben James" (Woody Guthrie) – 2:51
20. "Intro to Goodnight Irene" – 0:28
21. "Goodnight Irene" (Lead Belly, Alan Lomax) – 2:41
22. "Intro to Hit and Run" – 1:22
23. "Hit and Run" (John Stewart) – 2:16
24. "Intro to Where Have All the Flowers Gone" – 0:16
25. "Where Have All the Flowers Gone?" (Pete Seeger, Joe Hickerson) – 3:07
26. "Intro to Little Maggie" – 2:01
27. "Little Maggie" (Traditional) – 2:28
28. "Intro to The Spinnin' of the World" – 0:50
29. "The Spinnin' of the World" (Stewart) – 2:12
30. "Intro to Scotch and Soda" – 1:38
31. "Scotch and Soda" (Dave Guard) – 2:13
32. "Intro to When the Saints Go Marching In" – 0:46
33. "Saints Go Marching In" (Traditional) – 5:25
34. "Tomorrow Is a Long Time" (Bob Dylan) (video)

== Personnel ==
- Bob Shane – vocals, guitar, plectrum banjo
- Nick Reynolds – vocals, tenor guitar, conga
- John Stewart – vocals, banjo, guitar
- Dean Reilly – bass
