= Ron Furmanek =

Ron Furmanek is an American Grammy nominated music producer and filmographer who has produced over 200 CDs. His most recent work, which includes six Kingston Trio titles, is currently released on RichKat Records, through Collectors Choice Music in the United States.

== Biography ==
Ron Furmanek is one of the pioneers of compact disc compilations and re-issues, having produced over 200 CD titles since 1988, most notably Nipper’s Greatest Hits for RCA, The Capitol Collectors Series and the EMI Legendary Masters Series. His Les Paul: The Legend and the Legacy was nominated for the Grammy Award for Best Historical Album in 1993. The Frank Sinatra - The Capitol Years box (which went gold) offers one particular selection that not even the staunchest of Sinatra collectors recognized: a 1958 Billy May arrangement called "Here Goes".

He is an authority on the Beatles’ recorded and film and video history. His first “official” gig regarding the group dates back to research and consulting work for Capitol's releases Rarities of 1980 and 1982's Reel Music. Since 1987 he has color corrected the visuals and remixed the audio (when applicable) on all of The Beatles promotional films, The Beatles: The First U.S. Visit, The Beatles at Shea Stadium, Let It Be, and Magical Mystery Tour.

== Partial filmography ==
- 1972 The Beatles "Braverman's Condensed Cream of the Beatles" 12 minute short subject Chuck Braverman Supplied ALL Archival footage and Photos
- 1972 Geraldo Rivera's "Good Night America" television show ABC TV Archival Footage and Research
- 1976 The Beatles "Rock & Roll Music" TV Promo Spot Capitol Records Archival Footage
- 1977 The Beatles Forever NBC Syd Vinnedge Productions Archival Footage and Research
- 1978 Echoes of The 60s ABC TV Special ALA Productions Archival Footage and Research
- 1978 Heroes of Rock and Roll 2-Hour ABC Special Archival Footage and Research
- 1979 The Who The Kids Are Alright Archival Feature Film New World Pictures Footage and Research
- 1980 America's top Ten hosted by Casey Kasem weekly Archival Footage and Research
- 1980 The Kinks "One For the Road" Time Life home video Archival Footage and Research
- 1980 Bob Hope Special: Bob Hope's Overseas Christmas Tours I & II (6 hours) NBC TV Researcher
- 1980 Les Paul "The Wizard of Waushaka" Stray Cat productions Archival Footage
- 1980 The Ramones "Rock & Roll Radio" Sire Records promotional film Archive Footage
- 1980 The Doors No One Gets Out Alive Warners Home Video Archival Footage and Research
- 1980 John Lennon "Tribute to John Lennon" Scotti Brothers/Syd Vinnedge productions Archival Footage and Research
- 1981 George Harrison "All Those Years Ago" Promotional Video Dark Horse Records Archival Footage and Research
- 1981 Elvis Presley This Is Elvis Warner Brothers VHS, Betamax, Laserdisc & DVD
- 1981 The Beach Boys 20th Anniversary Special Howard Grossman prods. Archival Footage and Research
- 1981 The Kinks "Predictable" Arista Records promotional video Archival footage
- 1981 Portrait of a Legend Scotti Brothers/Syd Vinnedge productions 25 shows Archival Footage and Research
- 1982 34th Annual EMMY Awards ABC TV Smith/Hemion Productions Archival Footage and Research
- 1982 The Beatles Love Me Do The Beatles Capitol Records Co Director & Producer
- 1982 Nat King Cole TV spot Capitol Records Archive footage
- 1982 The Beatles Reel Music Movie Medley Promotional Video Capitol Records Archival Footage and Research
- 1982 Heart of Gold Canadian Music artists history Archival Footage and Research
- 1982 It Came From Hollywood Feature Film for Paramount Pictures Researcher
- 1982 Phil Spector Story BBC TV Archival footage
- 1982 When The Music's Over HBO / Appleland productions 1 hour special Archival Footage and Research
- 1983 The Rolling Stones Let's Spend the Night Together feature film Hal Ashby Archival Footage and Research
- 1983 Girl Groups MGM /UA Home Video 1 hour Archival Footage and Research
- 1983 The Beatles 20 Greatest Hits TV spot Capitol Records Archive footage
- 1983 Prime Times 1-Hour NBC Comedy Pilot Researcher
- 1983 Motown Records 25th Anniversary TV Special NBC 2 Hours Archival Footage and Research
- 1983 That's Television Entertainment NBC Smith/Hemion Productions 2 Hour Special
- 1983 Paul McCartney MTV interview Archival Footage
- 1982 34th Annual EMMY Awards ABC TV Smith/Hemion Productions Archival Footage and Research
- 1983 The Beatles Please Please Me (3 versions) The Beatles Capitol Records Co Director & Producer
- 1983 35th Annual EMMY Awards ABC TV Smith/Hemion Productions Archival Footage and Research
- 1984 The Beatles 20th Anniversary TV spot Capitol Records Archive footage
- 1984 The Beatles I Want To Hold Your Hand The Beatles Capitol Records Co Director & Producer
- 1984 Super Night of Rock and Roll 2-Hour NBC Special Malcolm Leo Productions Archival Footage and Research
- 1984 The Beach Boys An American Band VHS, Betamax, Laserdisc & DVD Associate Producer
- 1985 The Doors: Dance on Fire Universal Home Video Archival Footage and Research
- 1986 The Monkees "Zor & Zam" 20th Anniversary concert video shown on stage Created and Edited
- 1987 The Beatles in Help! Criterion Collection - Voyager Company Produced and Compiled Side four "The Help! Scrapbook"
- 1987 Elvis Presley "Elvis '56" Levon Helm Alan Raymond Archival Footage and Research
- 1987 Rolling Stone Presents Twenty Years of Rock & Roll (TV documentary) Archival Footage and Research
- 1988 The Smithereens Only A Memory (joke version video) Directed, Produced, Filmed,& Edited
- 1988 The Beatles Magical Mystery Tour The Beatles VHS, Betamax, & Laserdisc Restoration film & remix multitrack audio
- 1988 John Lennon "Imagine: John Lennon", Warner Bros Feature Film Archival Footage and Research
- 1989 The Rolling Stones "25 x 5: The Continuing Adventure of The Rolling Stones", Sony Archival Footage and Research
- 1990 Elvis Presley Elvis: The Great Performances, Buena Vista Home Video, Archival Footage and Research, Editor of "Unchained Melody"
- 1991 The Beatles The First US Visit Apple/ MPI VHS, Laserdisc & DVD The Beatles Production Coordination, Film Restoration
- 1994 The Beatles The Making Of A Hard Days Night "You Can't Do That" VHS, Laserdisc & DVD The Beatles Apple/ MPI Home Video Producer
- 1995 The Beatles The Beatles Anthology Film & Video Restoration & Research
- 1996 Music Scene “The Best of 1969-1970” Volumes 1-4 MPI Home Video Laserdisc, VHS, & DVD Compilation, Restoration and Producer
- 1996 Hullabaloo “A 1960s Music Flashback” Volumes 1-12 MPI Home Video Laserdisc, VHS, & DVD Compilation, Restoration and Producer
- 2009 Rock & Roll Hall of Fame induction ceremony Archival Footage
- 2010 Rock & Roll Hall of Fame induction ceremony Archival Footage
- 2011 Rock & Roll Hall of Fame induction ceremony Archival Footage
- 2011 The Hollies: Look Through Any Window 1963-1975 Reelin' In The Years productions Thanks
- 2013 The Cowsills Family Band Showtime Documentary Archival Footage and Research
- 2014 CNN presents 'The Sixties – "The British Invasion" Archival Footage and Research
- 2014 PBS presents "The Dave Clark Five And Beyond" Archival Footage and Research
- 2015 The Beatles "1" DVD / Blu-ray release Archival Footage and Research

== Partial discography ==
LP Vinyl Records

- 1980 Beatles Rarities The Beatles Capitol Records
- 1981 This Is Elvis Elvis Presley RCA Victor Records
- 1982 Reel Music The Beatles Capitol Records
- 1987 Rarities The Hollies EMI
- 1988 Capitol Collectors Series Hank Thompson Capitol Records
- 1989 Never Before The Byrds Murray Hill
- 1990 The Great Performances Elvis Presley RCA Victor Records
- 1990 The Capitol Years Frank Sinatra Capitol Records [5 Lp Set]
- 1990 Cole, Christmas, & Kids, Nat King Cole Capitol Records
- 1992 The Best of James Bond: 30th Anniversary (2 Lp Set) EMI Various Artists
- 1991 James Taylor Debut Album Apple Records
- Magic Christian Music Badfinger (2 LP Set)
- That's The Way God Planned It Billy Preston (2 Lp Set)
- Wonderwall Music George Harrison
- Electronic Sound George Harrison
- Is This What You Want? Jackie Lomax (2 Lp Set)
- Maybe Tomorrow The Iveys (2 Lp Set)
- Post Card Mary Hopkin (2 Lp Set)
- No Dice Badfinger (2 Lp Set)
- Rhada Krsna Temple The Radha Krsna Temple
- Straight Up Badfinger (2 Lp Set)
- Tim Hardin Lost in LA 45 RPM Lp Disc (2018 Record Store Day Release)

== Partial Compact Disc Discography ==
Release year	Title	Artist	Company
1988	Capitol Collectors Series	Bobby Darin	Capitol
1988	Capitol Collectors Series	Ferlin Husky	Capitol
1988	Capitol Collectors Series	Hank Thompson	Capitol
1988	Nipper's Greatest Hits: The 50s, Vol. 1	Various Artists	RCA/BMG
1988	Nipper's Greatest Hits: The 50s, Vol. 2	Various Artists	RCA/BMG
1988	Nipper's Greatest Hits: The 60s, Vol. 1	Various Artists	RCA/BMG
1988	Nipper's Greatest Hits: The 60s, Vol. 2	Various Artists	RCA/BMG
1988	Nipper's Greatest Hits: The 70s	Various Artists	RCA/BMG
1989	Capitol Collectors Series	Dean Martin	Capitol
1989	Capitol Collectors Series	Esquerita	Capitol
1989	Capitol Collectors Series	Frank Sinatra	Capitol
1989	Capitol Collectors Series	Johnny Mercer	Capitol
1989	Capitol Collectors Series	The Four Preps	Capitol
1989	Capitol Collectors Series	Wayne Newton	Capitol
1989	Legendary Masters Volume 1	Ricky Nelson	Imperial/EMI
1990	Capitol Collectors Series	Gene Vincent	Capitol
1990	Capitol Collectors Series	Jack Scott	Capitol
1990	Capitol Collectors Series	Jerry Lewis	Capitol
1990	Capitol Collectors Series	Margaret Whiting	Capitol
1990	Capitol Collectors Series	Merle Haggard	Capitol
1990	Capitol Collectors Series	Nat King Cole	Capitol
1990	Capitol Collectors Series	Peggy Lee	Capitol
1990	Capitol Collectors Series	Sammy Davis, Jr.	Capitol
1990	Capitol Collectors Series	Sonny James	Capitol
1990	Capitol Collectors Series	Stan Freberg	Capitol
1990	Capitol Collectors Series	The Kingston Trio	Capitol
1990	Capitol Collectors Series	The Outsiders	Capitol
1990	Cole, Christmas, and Kids	Nat King Cole	
1990	Ella Fitzgerald's Christmas	Ella Fitzgerald	Capitol
1990	Legendary Masters Series	Bobby Vee	Liberty/EMI
1990	Legendary Masters Series	Gary Lewis & the Playboys	Liberty/EMI
1990	Legendary Masters Series	Shirley & Lee	
1990	Legendary Masters Volume 2	Ricky Nelson	Imperial/EMI
1990	Merry Christmas from Bobby Vee	Bobby Vee	Liberty/EMI
1990	My Blue Heaven: The Best of	Fats Domino	Imperial/EMI
1990	research: Little Deuce Coupe / All Summer Long	The Beach Boys	Capitol
1990	research: Surfin' Safari / Surfin' U.S.A.	The Beach Boys	Capitol
1990	Surf City: The Best of Jan & Dean	Jan & Dean	EMI
1990	Tell Him	The Exciters	
1990	The Capitol Years [3-CD set]	Frank Sinatra	Capitol
1990	The Great Performances Elvis Presley		
1990	Walk Don't Run: The Best of	The Ventures	Dolton/EMI
1991	A Winter Romance	Dean Martin	Capitol
1991	All Time Greatest Hits, Vol. 2	Neil Sedaka	
1991	Capitol Collectors Series	Grand Funk Railroad	Capitol
1991	Capitol Collectors Series	Kay Starr	Capitol
1991	Capitol Collectors Series	Jo Stafford	Capitol
1991	Capitol Collectors Series	Louis Prima	Capitol
1991	Capitol Collectors Series	Raspberries	Capitol
1991	Capitol Collectors Series	Ray Anthony	Capitol
1991	Capitol Collectors Series	Tennessee Ernie Ford	Capitol
1991	Capitol Collectors Series	The Andrews Sisters	Capitol
1991	Capitol Collectors Series	The Four Freshmen	Capitol
1991	Complete UA Sessions	The Isley Brothers	United Artists/EMI
1991	EMI Legends of Rock n' Roll Series: 24 Greatest Hits of All Time [Volume 1]	Various Artists	Various/EMI
1991	Frankie Laine The Mercury Years Frankie Laine	Frankie Laine	Mercury
1991	Honey, The Best Of	Bobby Goldsboro	United Artists/EMI
1991	Is This What You Want?	Jackie Lomax	Apple Records
1991	James Taylor	James Taylor	Apple Records
1991	Patti Page Collection: The Mercury Years, Vol. 1	Patti Page	PolyGram
1991	Patti Page Collection: The Mercury Years, Vol. 2	Patti Page	PolyGram
1991	Post Card	Mary Hopkin	Apple Records
1991	Proud Mary: The Best of	Ike & Tina Turner	
1991	The Aladdin Years	The Five Keys	Aladdin/EMI
1991	The Definitive Collection Best of Billy J. Kramer	Billy J. Kramer & the Dakotas	Imperial/EMI
1991	The Last Month of the Year	The Kingston Trio	Capitol
1991	The Legend And The Legacy [4-CD set]	Les Paul	Capitol
1991	They Call Me The Fat Man [4-CD set]	Fats Domino	Imperial/EMI
1992	All I Really Want to Do / The Sonny Side of Cher	Cher	Imperial/EMI
1992	Best of Johnny Burnette: You're Sixteen	Johnny Burnette	Liberty/EMI
1992	Best of Manfred Mann: The Definitive Collection	Manfred Mann	Ascot/EMI
1992	Best of Smiley Lewis: I Hear You Knocking	Smiley Lewis	
1992	Capitol Collectors Series	Al Martino	Capitol
1992	Capitol Collectors Series	Tex Ritter	Capitol
1992	Capitol Collectors Series	The Pied Pipers	Capitol
1992	Capitol Collectors Series	The Lettermen	Capitol
1992	Capitol Collectors Series	The Seekers	Capitol
1992	Complete United Artists I'm a Happy Man	The Jive Five	United Artists/EMI
1992	Everybody Loves a Clown / She's Just My Style	Gary Lewis & the Playboys	Liberty/EMI
1992	Favorites And Rarities [2-CD set]	Don McLean	United Artists/EMI
1992	Hundred Pounds of Clay: The Best of	Gene McDaniels	Liberty/EMI
1992	Hurt: The Best of	Timi Yuro	
1992	Julie Is Her Name / Julie Is Her Name Vol. 2	Julie London	Liberty/EMI
1992	Legends of Christmas Past: A Rock n' R&B Holiday Collection	Various Artists	Various/EMI
1992	Little Games [1-CD set]	The Yardbirds	
1992	Little Games Sessions & More [2-CD set]	The Yardbirds	
1992	Michael Row The Boat Ashore, The Best of	The Highwaymen	
1992	Power Of Love	Hour Glass	Liberty/EMI
1992	Ride the Wild Surf / "The Little Old Lady (from Pasadena)"	Jan & Dean	Liberty/EMI
1992	Rock Is Dead but It Won't Lie Down: 24 Greatest Hits of All Time, Volume 2	Various Artists	
1992	Snowbound / We Wish You a Merry Christmas	Ferrante & Teicher	United Artists/EMI
1992	The Best Of Freddie & The Dreamers The Definitive Collection	Freddie and the Dreamers	Tower/EMI
1992	The Best of James Bond: 30th Anniversary Collection [1-CD set]	Various Artists	EMI
1992	The Best of James Bond: 30th Anniversary Limited Edition [2-CD set]	Various Artists	EMI
1992	The Best Of The Capitol Masters - Selections From "The Legend And The Legacy"	Les Paul with Mary Ford	Capitol
1992	Ventures Play Telstar / Ventures in Space	The Ventures	Dolton/EMI
1993	All Time Great Movie Themes	Ferrante & Teicher	United Artists/EMI
1993	Best of Bob Lind: You Might Have Heard My Footsteps	Bob Lind	
1993	Best of Garnet Mimms: Cry Baby	Garnet Mimms	
1993	Best of Sweet	The Sweet	Capitol
1993	Capitol Collectors Series	The Five Keys	Capitol
1993	A Celtic Requiem	John Tavener	
1993	Changes / Rewind	Johnny Rivers	Imperial/EMI
1993	Come Softly to Me: The Very Best of the Fleetwoods	The Fleetwoods	Dolton/EMI
1993	Hippy Hippy Shake: The Definitive Collection	The Swinging Blue Jeans	
1993	Sands of Time / Wax Museum	Jay & the Americans	United Artists/EMI
1993	Singin' to My Baby / Never to Be Forgotten	Eddie Cochran	Liberty/EMI
1993	Spirit of New Orleans: The Genius of Dave Bartholomew [2-CD set]	Various Artists	
1993	The Whale	John Tavener	
1994	30th Anniversary [3-CD set]	The Hollies	Imperial/EMI
1994	Best of Amos Milburn: Down the Road Apiece	Amos Milburn	
1994	Capitol Collectors Series	Ella Mae Morse	Capitol
1994	Capitol Collectors Series	The Honeys	Capitol
1994	Capitol Collectors Series	The Journeymen	Capitol
1994	Jumpin' with Joe: The Complete Aladdin & Imperial Recordings	Big Joe Turner	
1994	The Alladin Records Story [2-CD set]	Various Artists	
1994	The Minit Records Story [2-CD set]	Various Artists	
1994	Uncanned! The Best of Canned Heat [2-CD set]	Canned Heat	
1994	What The World Needs Now Is ... The Definitive Collection	Jackie DeShannon	Imperial/EMI
1995	The Capitol Years [4-CD set]	The Kingston Trio	Capitol
1995	Best of Gerry & The Pacemakers: The Definitive Collection	Gerry & The Pacemakers	
1995	Goldsinger - The Best Of	Shirley Bassey	United Artists/EMI
1995	King of the Blues [2-CD set]	Freddie King	
1995	research & transfer: Very Best of the Fortunes (1967 - 1972)	The Fortunes	
1995	Those Were the Days	Mary Hopkin	Apple
1996	All the Hits: From Surf City to Drag City [2-CD set]	Jan & Dean	Liberty/EMI
1996	Ass	Badfinger	Apple
1996	Best of Eddy Howard: The Mercury Years	Eddy Howard	
1996	Best of Georgia Gibbs: The Mercury Years	Georgia Gibbs	
1996	Best of Little Anthony & the Imperials	Little Anthony & the Imperials	
1996	Best of Ralph Marterie: The Mercury Years	Ralph Marterie	
1996	Best of The Crew Cuts: The Mercury Years	The Crew Cuts	
1996	Best of The Danleers: The Mercury Years	The Danleers	
1996	Best of The Del Vikings: The Mercury Years	The Del Vikings	
1996	Best of The Diamonds: The Mercury Years	The Diamonds	
1996	Best of The Gaylords: The Mercury Years	The Gaylords	
1996	Best of The Penguins: The Mercury Years	The Penguins	
1996	Best of Tony Martin: The Mercury Years	Tony Martin	
1996	Best of Vic Damone: The Mercury Years	Vic Damone	
1996	Dark Shadows: The 30th Anniversary Collection		
1996	Growin' Up Too Fast: The Girl Group Anthology	Various Artists	
1996	Que Sea El	Vikki Carr	
1996	research & transfer: Rockin' With Ricky	Ricky Nelson	
1996	research & transfer: Very Best of David Rose	David Rose	
1996	Tele-Ventures: The Ventures Perform the Great TV Themes	The Ventures	
1996	That's Fats: A Tribute to Fats Domino	Various Artists	
1996	The Fat Man: 25 Classic Performances	Fats Domino	
1996	Time Is On My Side	Irma Thomas	
1997	Batmania: Songs Inspired by Batman TV Series	Various Artists	
1998	Best of the Chad Mitchell Trio: The Mercury Years	Chad Mitchell Trio	
1998	Don't Let the Rain Come Down: The Best of	The Serendipity Singers	
1998	Very Best of Red Bird & Blue Cat Records	Various Artists	
1999	Detroit Rock City Original Soundtrack	Various Artists	
2000	Best of the Capitol and the Aladdin Years [2-CD set]	The Five Keys	
2000	Legacy [4-CD set]	Ricky Nelson	
2000	The Very Best of	Chad & Jeremy	
2001	Best of the Crew Cuts	The Crew Cuts	
2001	Ricky Sings Again / Songs by Ricky	Ricky Nelson	
2001	Ultimate Peter & Gordon	Peter & Gordon	
2002	Best of Dennis Yost & the Classics IV	Classics IV	Taragon
2005	Good Morning Starshine: The Best of	Oliver	Taragon
2005	The Best Of The Capitol Masters: 90th Birthday Edition	Les Paul with Mary Ford	Capitol
2007	Live at the Santa Monica Auditorium	The Kingston Trio	RichKat Records
2007	Nick, Bob & John: The Final Concert	The Kingston Trio	RichKat Records
2007	Once Upon a Time	The Kingston Trio	RichKat Records
2007	The Lost 1967 Album: Rarities Vol. 1	The Kingston Trio	RichKat Records
2007	Twice Upon a Time	The Kingston Trio	RichKat Records
2008	Turning Like Forever: Rarities, Vol. 2	The Kingston Trio	RichKat Records
2011	The Girls From Petticoat Junction Complete Recordings		Real Gone
2012	The Complete Blue Cat Recordings	The Ad Libs	Real Gone
2012	The Red Bird Girls Very First Time In True Stereo 1964-1966	Various Artists	Real Gone
2015	The Best of Herman's Hermits: The 50th Anniversary Anthology [2-CD set]	Herman's Hermits	Bear Family
2016	The Lost Studio Sessions 1964-1982	Gene Clark	Sierra
2019	Simple Gifts (The Lost Solo Sessions)	Bob Shane	Kingston Trio Music Publishing
2020	Old Forgotten Altars: The 1960s Demos	John Stewart	Omnivore Recordings / RichKat Records
Driftin' Blues: The Best of	Charles Brown		
	Electronic Sound	George Harrison	Apple Records
	Maybe Tomorrow	The Iveys	Apple Records
	Merry from Lena	Lena Horne	
	No Dice	Badfinger	Apple Records
	research: Pet Sounds	The Beach Boys	Capitol
	Straight Up	Badfinger	Apple Records
	The Radha Krsna Temple	Radha Krsna Temple	Apple Records
	Ventures' Christmas Album	The Ventures	
	Wonderwall Music	George Harrison	Apple Records
