= An Evening with The Kingston Trio =

Live album by The Kingston Trio
- Released: 1994
- Recorded: 1962
- Genre: Folk
- Length: 54:13
- Label: Folk Era
- Producer: Steve Fiott

The Kingston Trio chronology
Treasure Chest (1993)	An Evening with The Kingston Trio (1994)	Live at Newport (1994)

An Evening with The Kingston Trio is a live album by the American folk music group the Kingston Trio, recorded in 1962 and released in 1994 (see 1994 in music). At the time of the performance, the group consisted of Bob Shane, Nick Reynolds, and John Stewart.

== Reception ==
Professional ratings
Review scores
Source	Rating
Allmusic	3/5 stars

In his Allmusic review, music critic Bruce Eder wrote of the album "the material is sung and played with lots of enthusiasm, which proves fairly infectious. This disc has more excitement than the trio's earlier Newport appearance, and a more interesting array of songs than Folk Era's Dave Guard-trio Stereo Concert Plus CD, though they aren't always quite as careful in their performance."

== Track listing ==
1. "Little Light" (Arranged by Reynolds, Shane, Stewart) – 3:06
2. "Coplas" (Traditional) – 3:56
3. "Sinking of the Reuben James" (Woody Guthrie) – 3:27
4. "The Wagoner's Lad" (Traditional) – 4:01
5. "M.T.A." (Bess Lomax Hawes, Jacqueline Steiner) - 5:13
6. "Chilly Winds" (John Phillips, John Stewart)– 4:04
7. "The Ballad of the Shape of Things" (Sheldon Harnick) – 5:09
8. "Hard, Ain't It Hard" (Guthrie) – 3:12
9. "Tom Dooley" (Alan Lomax, Frank Warner) – 4:14
10. "Wimoweh" (Paul Campbell, Solomon Linda) – 1:59
11. "The Merry Minuet" (Harnick) – 2:48
12. "Scotch and Soda" (Dave Guard) – 2:37
13. "Where Have All the Flowers Gone?" (Pete Seeger, Joe Hickerson) – 4:40
14. "Saints Go Marching In" (Traditional) – 2:46
15. "Goin' Away for to Leave You" (Phillips) – 2:52

== Personnel ==
- Bob Shane – vocals, guitar
- Nick Reynolds – vocals, tenor guitar, bongos, conga
- John Stewart – vocals, banjo, guitar
- Dean Reilly – bass

== Production notes ==
- Steve Fiott – producer
- Allan Shaw – executive producer
