= Everybody's Talking (album) =

Everybody's Talking: The Houston Tapes, Volume 1

Live album by The Kingston Trio
- Released: 1989
- Recorded: 1989
- Venue: Rockefeller's, Houston, Texas
- Genre: Folk
- Label: Folk Era
- Producer: George Grove

The Kingston Trio chronology
Looking for the Sunshine (1983)	Everybody's Talking: The Houston Tapes, Volume 1 (1989)	Capitol Collectors Series (1990)

Everybody's Talking: The Houston Tapes, Volume 1 is a live album by the American folk music group the Kingston Trio, released in 1989 (see 1989 in music). The group consisted of Bob Shane, George Grove and Nick Reynolds. Reynolds had left the group in 1967 and returned in 1988.

== Reception ==
Professional ratings
Review scores
Source	Rating
Allmusic	1.5/5 stars

The Allmusic critic Zac Johnson was critical of the album, writing that the live performance "seems clumsy and a little disturbing... and the various jokes about gays and masturbation seem awfully creepy from these guys... and while their humor on their original LPs seems bright and original, in 1989 their onstage banter seems forced, a little mean-spirited, and rarely funny. Unlike seasoned artists like Johnny Cash and Willie Nelson, whose journeys through life and show business have added some wisdom and depth to their performances, the Kingston Trio's travels seem to have made them seem more like Vegas comedians performing way off the strip."

== Track listing ==
1. "Hard Ain't it Hard'" (Woody Guthrie) – 3:51
2. "Talk" – 1:29
3. "Three Jolly Coachmen" (Traditional) – 2:18
4. "Early Morning Rain" (Gordon Lightfoot) – 3:30
5. "Talk" – 1:43
6. "Greenback Dollar" (Hoyt Axton, Kennard Ramsey) – 3:01
7. "Talk" – 1:50
8. "Everybody's Talkin'" (Fred Neil) – 3:06
9. "Talk" – :35
10. "Ah Woe, Ah Me" (Reynolds, Shane, Stewart) – 2:50
11. "Talk" – :30
12. "M.T.A." (Bess Lomax Hawes, Jacqueline Steiner) - 3:16
13. "Band Introductions" – 5:15
14. "Everything" (A. Elliott) – 3:33
15. "Talk" – 2:29
16. "Long Black Veil" (Danny Dill, Marijohn Wilkin) - 3:46
17. "Talk" – :57
18. "Hobo's Lullaby" (Goebel Reeves) – 3:34
19. "Tom Dooley" (Alan Lomax, Frank Warner) – 3:05
20. "Talk" – 1:05
21. "A Worried Man" (Dave Guard, Tom Glazer) – 3:08
22. "Talk" – 48
23. "Scotch and Soda" (Dave Guard) – 2:21
24. "Talk" – :46
25. "I'm Going Home" (Fred Geis) – 3:08

== Personnel ==
Performers

- Bob Shane – vocals, guitar
- Nick Reynolds – vocals, tenor guitar, conga
- George Grove – vocals, banjo, guitar
- Paul Gabrielson – bass guitar
- Tom Green – percussion
- Ben Schubert – fiddle, electric tenor guitar
- Frank Sanchez – congas, bongos

Production

- George Grove – producer
- Ron Busch – executive producer
- Phil Barratt – engineer
