= The World Needs a Melody =

Studio album by The New Kingston Trio
- Released: April 1973
- Genre: Folk
- Label: Longines Symphonette Society

The New Kingston Trio chronology
The World Needs a Melody (1973)	The Lost Masters 1969–1972 (1997)

The Kingston Trio chronology
Once Upon a Time (1969)	The World Needs a Melody (1973)	Aspen Gold (1979)

The World Needs a Melody is an album by The New Kingston Trio, released in 1973.

== History ==
Two years before the release of Once Upon a Time in 1969, the Kingston Trio disbanded in 1967 following a two-week farewell engagement at San Francisco's Hungry i, the nightclub at which they had started their rise to prominence a decade earlier. John Stewart began a solo career, Nick Reynolds retired from the music business and, after a short-lived solo career, Bob Shane created a new group, The New Kingston Trio. The first configuration of this new group lasted approximately three years and consisted of Shane, Pat Horine, and Jim Connor; a second troupe including Shane, Bill Zorn, and Roger Gambill toured from 1973 to 1976 before Shane bought the rights to the Kingston Trio name outright and assembled a new group with Gambill and George Grove.

The only full-length album released by either group was The World Needs a Melody (though 25 years later FolkEra Records issued The Lost Masters 1969-1972, a compilation of previously unreleased tracks from the Shane-Horine-Connor years), and its sales were negligible. Though both troupes of the New Kingston Trio made a limited number of other recordings and several television appearances, neither generated very much interest from fans or the public at large.

There were no credits included on the album packaging. The back cover consisted of a track listing and an essay and photographs titled "The Secret of Longines Symphonette" describing the process of recording LPs.

== Track listing ==
1. "The World Needs a Melody" (J. Slate, L. Hinley, H. Delaughter)
2. "Grandma's Feather Bed" (Jim Connor)
3. "In Tall Buildings" (John Hartford)
4. "Riley's Medicine Show"
5. "Blue Skies and Teardrops" (Mike Williams)
6. "Jug Town" (Billy Edd Wheeler)
7. "Lovin' You Again"
8. "Come the Morning"
9. "Roll Your Own, Cowboys"
10. "Nellie" (Barry Etris)

== Personnel ==
- Bob Shane - vocals, guitar
- Pat Horine - vocals, guitar
- Jim Connor - vocals, guitar, banjo
- Stan Kaess - bass
- Frank Sanchez - drums
