= The Final Concert (The Kingston Trio album) =

Live album by The Kingston Trio
- Released: April 16, 2007
- Recorded: June 1967
- Genre: Folk
- Label: RichKat Records through Collectors' Choice
- Producer: Ron Furmanek

The Kingston Trio chronology
Once Again (2004)	The Final Concert (2007)	The Lost 1967 Album: Rarities Vol. 1 (2007)

The Final Concert is a live album by the American folk music group The Kingston Trio, recorded in 1967 and released in 2007 (see 2007 in music).

== History ==
The Trio (consisting of Bob Shane, Nick Reynolds and John Stewart) disbanded after this, their final concert, held at the hungry i club in San Francisco, the same club where they recorded one of their best-selling albums of their early career. Prior to the release of Children of the Morning, the trio had decided to disband in one year after a tour and another album. They again entered the studio and recorded an album (The Lost 1967 Album: Rarities Vol. 1) of mostly contemporary covers, but it was not released. Their label at the time also declined to release the live album they recorded during the final tour, although it was eventually released in 1969 on Tetragrammaton Records.

After this final concert, John Stewart began a solo career, Nick Reynolds retired from the music business (though eventually he would return to the Trio) and Bob Shane attempted a solo career before re-forming the group as The New Kingston Trio.

== Reception ==
Professional ratings
Review scores
Source	Rating
Allmusic	4/5 stars
Allmusic	3.5/5 stars

Allmusic critic Jeff Tamarkin first compared the symbolism of the Trio's final concert taking place the same night as the Monterey Pop Festival. He wrote of the live album "Whether they would ever admit it publicly or not, for many of the Monterey acts, from Jefferson Airplane to the Association to the Mamas & the Papas, the Kingston Trio had served as a primary influence. The aural evidence shows that, up till the last minute... the Kingston Trio remained as engaging as they'd been from the start... The trio's vocal leads and harmonies are excellent throughout and they more than hold their own instrumentally...The Kingston Trio's June 1967 farewell was perfectly timed to mark the end of an era, and they went out in style."

== Track listing ==
1. "Introduction" - 1:42
2. "Hard, Ain't It Hard" (Woody Guthrie) - 4:41
3. "Early Mornin' Rain" (Gordon Lightfoot) – 5:27
4. "M.T.A." (Bess Lomax Hawes, Jacqueline Steiner) - 6:27
5. "Tomorrow Is a Long Time" (Bob Dylan) – 5:40
6. "Reverend Mr. Black" (Leiber, Stoller, Billy Edd Wheeler) - 5:20
7. "The Ballad of the Shape of Things" (Sheldon Harnick) – 5:06
8. "Greenback Dollar" (Hoyt Axton, Kennard Ramsey) - 4:45
9. "Thirsty Boots" (Eric Andersen) - 6:31
10. "Colours" (Donovan) – 3:04
11. "One Too Many Mornings" (Dylan) – 3:36
12. "Tom Dooley" (Alan Lomax, Frank Warner) – 6:18
13. "Wimoweh" (Paul Campbell, Solomon Linda) – 2:42
14. "Where Have All the Flowers Gone?" (Pete Seeger, Joe Hickerson) - 5:59
15. "Scotch and Soda" (Dave Guard) – 4:51

== Personnel ==
- Bob Shane – vocals, guitar
- Nick Reynolds – vocals, tenor guitar
- John Stewart – vocals, banjo, guitar
- Dean Reilly – bass
