= Live at Newport (The Kingston Trio album) =

Live album by The Kingston Trio
- Released: 1994
- Recorded: 1959 at the Newport Folk Festival, Newport, Rhode Island
- Genre: Folk
- Length: 37:31
- Label: Vanguard
- Producer: Mary Katherine Aldin

The Kingston Trio chronology
An Evening with The Kingston Trio (1994)	Live at Newport (1994)	Live at the Crazy Horse (1994)

Live at Newport is a live album by the American folk music group the Kingston Trio, released in 1994 (see 1994 in music). It contains a performance by the trio at the 1959 Newport Folk Festival in Newport, Rhode Island. At the time of the performance, the group consisted of Dave Guard, Bob Shane and Nick Reynolds.

== History ==
The Newport Folk Festival of 1959 comprised a large and diverse list of performers. The Kingston Trio, having recently played a folk music program at the Newport Jazz Festival were originally slated to be the final act on Sunday night, but were later moved up one slot to allow Earl Scruggs to close the show. The crowd was so enthusiastic about the Trio that they came on to do another encore after Scruggs' performance, a move organizer George Wein recalled as "... an insult to Scruggs, one of the most revered figures of bluegrass. I lost a lot of friends in the folk world for that slipup."

Peter Dreier of Occidental College observed that "Purists often derided the Kingston Trio for watering down folk songs in order to make them commercially popular and for remaining on the political sidelines during the protest movements of the 1960s." A series of scathing articles had previously appeared over several years in Sing Out! magazine, a publication that combined articles on traditional folk music with political activism.

Following the Trio's performance at the 1959 festival, folk music critic Mark Morris wrote "What connection these frenetically tinselly showmen have with a folk festival eludes me...except that it is mainly folk songs that they choose to vulgarize." English folk revivalist Shirley Collins was critical of many of the acts, including Odetta and Bob Gibson, but especially the Trio, stating "I despised them. The audience loved them!"

Three LPs by Vanguard and a two-volume set by Folkways of the festival performance were released, though none included The Kingston Trio, most likely due to contractual arrangements.

== Reception ==
Professional ratings
Review scores
Source	Rating
Allmusic	3/5 stars

Allmusic music critic Richie Unterberger wrote of the release "it's a good-sounding and well-executed performance, but only necessary for major fans."

== Track listing ==
1. "Introduction" – :53
2. "Saro Jane" (Traditional) – 2:30
3. "M.T.A." (Bess Lomax Hawes, Jacqueline Steiner) - 3:47
4. "All My Sorrows" (Arranged by Dave Guard, Nick Reynolds, Bob Shane) - 2:55
5. "Remember the Alamo" (Jane Bowers) - 3:30
6. "E Inu Tatou E" (George Archer) – 2:46
7. "Hard, Ain't It Hard" (Woody Guthrie) – 3:22
8. "The Merry Minuet" (Harnick) – 2:44
9. "Saints Go Marching In" (Traditional) – 2:31
10. "Three Jolly Coachmen" (Traditional) – 2:25
11. "South Coast" (Richard Dehr, Sam Eskin, Frank Miller, Lillian Ross) – 4:33
12. "Scotch and Soda" (Dave Guard) – 2:49
13. "Zombie Jamboree" (Conrad Eugene Mauge Jr.) – 2:46

== Personnel ==
- Dave Guard – vocals, banjo, guitar
- Bob Shane – vocals, guitar
- Nick Reynolds – vocals, tenor guitar, bongos, conga
- David "Buck" Wheat – bass, guitar

== Production notes ==
- Mary Katherine Aldin – producer, liner notes
- Kent Crawford – executive producer
- Frank Werber – liner notes
- Captain Jeff Zaraya – engineer, mixing

The song 'Coplas' was originally the second song in the set, but Vanguard deemed it too politically incorrect to issue here. (Bear Family's 'The Guard Years' box set has the entire concert.)
