= Capitol Collectors Series (The Kingston Trio album) =

Compilation album by The Kingston Trio
- Released: 1990
- Recorded: April 4, 1958 – December 2, 1963
- Genre: Folk
- Length: 53:28
- Label: Capitol
- Producer: Voyle Gilmore, Ron Furmanek

The Kingston Trio chronology
Everybody's Talking (1989)	Capitol Collectors Series (1990)	Treasure Chest (1993)

Capitol Collectors Series is a compilation album of the American folk music group the Kingston Trio's recordings from their time with the Capitol Records label. It contains songs from both the Dave Guard and John Stewart trios. All the songs included were released as singles by the group with two ("The Tijuana Jail", Coo Coo U") having never appeared on any of their principal recordings.

== Reception ==
Professional ratings
Review scores
Source	Rating
Allmusic	5/5 stars

The Allmusic critic, Bruce Eder, called the compilation the first serious and broad compilation of the trio although noting the lack of some important tracks. He criticized the emphasis on singles rather than album tracks. He also wrote, "The four-CD set The Capitol Years can be recommended more highly to those who really want to understand the group's appeal and music, or just to remember the stuff they heard back when. This disc is a good introduction to one side of the Kingston Trio's work, but it shouldn't be the last compilation that one buys on the group."

== Track listing ==
1. "Scarlet Ribbons" (Evelyn Danzig, Jack Segal) - 2:19
2. "Tom Dooley" (Alan Lomax, Frank Warner) – 3:05
3. "Raspberries, Strawberries" (Will Holt) – 2:07
4. "The Tijuana Jail" (Denny Thompson) - 2:50
5. "M.T.A." (Bess Lomax Hawes, Jacqueline Steiner) - 3:16
6. "A Worried Man" (Traditional, Tom Glazer, Dave Guard) - 3:27
7. "Coo Coo-U" (Bill Loughborough, David Wheat) - 2:19
8. "El Matador" (Jane Bowers, Irving Burgess) - 2:27
9. "Bad Man Blunder" (Lee Hays, Cisco Houston) - 2:39
10. "Everglades" (Harlan Howard) - 2:21
11. "Where Have All the Flowers Gone?" (Pete Seeger, Joe Hickerson) - 3:04
12. "Scotch and Soda" (Dave Guard) – 2:34
13. "Jane, Jane, Jane" (Stan Wilson) – 2:53
14. "One More Town" (John Stewart) – 2:59
15. "Greenback Dollar" (Hoyt Axton, Kennard Ramsey) - 2:51
16. "Reverend Mr. Black" (Leiber, Stoller, Billy Edd Wheeler) - 3:16
17. "Desert Pete" (Billy Edd Wheeler) - 2:49
18. "Ally Ally Oxen Free" (Rod McKuen, Sammy Yates) - 2:06
19. "Patriot Game" (Dominic Behan) – 2:53
20. "Seasons in the Sun" (Rod McKuen, Jacques Brel) – 2:53

== Personnel ==
- Dave Guard – vocals, banjo, guitar
- Bob Shane – vocals, banjo, guitar
- Nick Reynolds – vocals, tenor guitar, bongos, conga
- John Stewart – vocals, banjo, guitar
- David "Buck" Wheat – double bass
