= The Lost Masters 1969–1972 =

Compilation album by The New Kingston Trio
- Released: 1997
- Recorded: 1969–1972
- Genre: Folk
- Length: 33:43
- Label: Folk Era
- Producer: Pat Horine

The New Kingston Trio chronology
| The World Needs a Melody (1973) | The Lost Masters 1969–1972 (1997) |

The Kingston Trio chronology
| The Capitol Years (1995) | The Lost Masters 1969–1972 (1997) | The Kingston Trio: The Guard Years (1997) |

The Lost Masters 1969–1972 is an album by the New Kingston Trio, recorded in 1969 to 1972 and released in 1997.

== History ==
Two years before the release of Once Upon a Time in 1969, the Kingston Trio disbanded in 1967 following a two-week farewell engagement at San Francisco's Hungry i, the nightclub at which they had started their rise to prominence a decade earlier. John Stewart began a solo career, Nick Reynolds retired from the music business and, after a short-lived solo career, Bob Shane created a new group, The New Kingston Trio. The first configuration of this new group lasted approximately three years and consisted of Shane, Pat Horine, and Jim Connor; a second troupe including Shane, Bill Zorn, and Roger Gambill toured from 1973 to 1976 before Shane bought the rights to the Kingston Trio name outright and assembled a new group with Gambill and George Grove.

The New Kingston Trio consisted of Shane, guitarist and vocalist Pat Horine, and multi-instrumentalist and vocalist Jim Connor. They continued to perform songs from the old Kingston Trio repertoire as well as new material. The songs on The Lost Masters were culled from studio tapes Horine found while unpacking boxes in storage at his home.

== Reception ==
Professional ratings
Review scores
| Source | Rating |
|---|---|
| Allmusic | 4/5 stars |

Writing for Allmusic, music critic Bruce Eder wrote of the album; "This is a better set of songs, as a Kingston Trio-type album, than the old Trio's last official album for Decca. The music has a lingering early-1960s folk earnestness, but it also displays a good sense of modern production and aesthetic sensibilities.... It's a good collection, and a worthy addition to any serious collections of the Kingston Trio."

== Track listing ==
1. "You're the One" (Bob Morrison) – 2:38
2. "Nellie" (Barry Etris) – 2:42
3. "Sold American" (Kinky Friedman) – 3:08
4. "Peace Loving Gentleman" (Pat Horine, Chuck Trisko) – 2:55
5. "Rubber Car" (Leonard Metzger) – 2:48
6. "Oldest Living Son" (John Stewart) – 2:59
7. "I'll Find You" (Horine, Charles Stone) – 2:37
8. "Smokin' Grapevine" (Bob Shane) – 2:37
9. "I'm on My Way Back Home" (Jim Connor) – 3:10
10. "Minstrel Man" (Horine) – 2:55
11. "The Dutchman" (Michael Smith) – 5:14

== Personnel ==
- Bob Shane - vocals, guitar
- Pat Horine - vocals, guitar
- Jim Connor - vocals, guitar, harmonica, percussion, jaw harp

Additional musicians:

- Stan Kaess - bass
- Frank Sanchez - drums

== Production ==
- Pat Horine - producer
- Bob Richardson - engineer
- Chuck Glaser - engineer
- Mike Graham - engineer
- Allan Shaw - liner notes
- Jeff Mellentine - executive producer
