= Once Again (The Kingston Trio album) =

Studio album by The Kingston Trio
- Released: June 1, 2004
- Recorded: 1977 and January 25–26, 1979 at Kendun Recorders, Burbank, CA
- Genre: Folk
- Length: 32:18
- Label: Folk Era
- Producer: Steve Clark, Voyle Gilmore

The Kingston Trio chronology
The Decca Years (2002)	Once Again (2004)	The Final Concert (2007)

Once Again is an album by the American folk music group The Kingston Trio, recorded in 1977 and 1979 and reissued in 2004 (see 2004 in music). The group consisted of the line up of Bob Shane, George Grove, and Roger Gambill.

Once Again includes all the songs recorded in 1979 for the album Aspen Gold which was released on the Nautilus Records label. The Trio had previously recorded and released a single "Johnson Party of Four" b/w "Big Ship Glory" in 1977 which is included in this reissue. Voyle Gilmore, the original Trio's producer when they were signed to Capitol Records, produced the single after his retirement from Capitol. The single was released by Mountain Creek Records but never went beyond the stage of promotional copies being sent to radio stations.

== Reception ==
Professional ratings
Review scores
Source	Rating
Allmusic	3/5 stars

Allmusic critic Steve Leggett called the release essentially a re-issue of Aspen Gold "with the Mountain Creek single ("Johnson Party of Four" b/w "Big Ship Glory") tacked on at the end of it... It is interesting to hear a hard-charging, drum-paced version of "Greenback Dollar," and both "Aspen Gold" and the group's version of Gordon Lightfoot's classic "Early Morning Rain" are pleasantly done, but Aspen Gold/Once Again is hardly essential unless you're a die-hard fan."

== Track listing ==
"California" was previously recorded under the title "I'm Goin' Home".

1. "A Worried Man" (Dave Guard, Tom Glazer) – 2:37
2. "Greenback Dollar" (Hoyt Axton, Kennard Ramsey) – 2:20
3. "Reuben James" (Woody Guthrie) – 2:38
4. "Hard Ain't it Hard'" (Guthrie) – 2:04
5. "California" (Fred Geis) – 2:46
6. "Aspen Gold" (Harold Payne) – 2:33
7. "Early Morning Rain" (Gordon Lightfoot) – 3:06
8. "Scotch and Soda" (Guard) – 2:17
9. "M.T.A./Tom Dooley" (Bess Lomax Hawes, Jacqueline Steiner / (Alan Lomax, Frank Warner) – 4:01
10. "The Longest Beer of the Night" (Carson Parks) – 2:29
11. "Johnson Party of Four" (H. Payne) – 3:05
12. "Big Ship Glory" (Charlie Merriam) – 2:22

== Personnel ==
- Bob Shane – vocals, guitar
- Roger Gambill – vocals, guitar
- George Grove – vocals, banjo, guitar

Additional musicians:

- Stan Kaess – bass
- Tom Green – drums
- Ben Schubert – fiddle, mandolin
