= Aspen Gold =

Studio album by The Kingston Trio
- Released: May 1979
- Recorded: January 25–26, 1979
- Studio: Kendun Recorders, Burbank, California
- Genre: Folk
- Label: Nautilus Records
- Producer: Steve Clark

The Kingston Trio chronology
Once Upon a Time (1969)	Aspen Gold (1979)	Looking for the Sunshine (1983)

Alternative Cover

Aspen Gold is an album by the American folk music group the Kingston Trio, released in 1979 (see 1979 in music). The group consisted of the line up of Bob Shane, George Grove, and Roger Gambill.

== History ==
Aspen Gold included re-recordings of nine previously released songs done regularly by the Trio in their live act along with two new songs — "Aspen Gold" and "Longest Beer of the Night" — the latter two released as a single but distributed only for radio promotional purposes. The album was minimally distributed and did not chart. It is out of print although Folk Era has essentially reissued the album as Once Again with the inclusion of the 1977 single "Johnson Party of Four" b/w "Big Ship Glory".

== Reception ==
Professional ratings
Review scores
Source	Rating
Allmusic	4.5/5 stars
Allmusic	3/5 stars

While noting that Once Again is a reissue of Aspen Gold with two additional tracks, Allmusic critic Steve Leggett noted "It is interesting to hear a hard-charging, drum-paced version of "Greenback Dollar," and both "Aspen Gold" and the group's version of Gordon Lightfoot's classic "Early Morning Rain" are pleasantly done, but Aspen Gold/Once Again is hardly essential unless you're a die-hard fan."

== Track listing ==
"California" was previously recorded under the title "I'm Goin' Home".

=== Side one ===
1. "A Worried Man" (Dave Guard, Tom Glazer) – 2:37
2. "Greenback Dollar" (Hoyt Axton, Kennard Ramsey) – 2:20
3. "Reuben James" (Woody Guthrie) – 2:38
4. "Hard Ain't It Hard'" (Guthrie) – 2:04
5. "California" (Fred Geis) – 2:46

=== Side two ===
1. "Aspen Gold" (Harold Payne) – 2:33
2. "Early Morning Rain" (Gordon Lightfoot) – 3:06
3. "Scotch and Soda" (Guard) – 2:17
4. "M.T.A./Tom Dooley" (Bess Lomax Hawes, Jacqueline Steiner / (Alan Lomax, Frank Warner) – 4:01
5. "The Longest Beer of the Night" (Carson Parks) – 2:29

== Personnel ==
- Bob Shane – vocals, guitar
- Roger Gambill – vocals, guitar
- George Grove – vocals, banjo, guitar
- Stan Kaess – bass
- Tom Green – drums
- Ben Schubert – fiddle, mandolin
