= Make Way (The Kingston Trio album) =

Studio album by The Kingston Trio
- Released: January 30, 1961
- Recorded: October 3–5, 1960
- Genre: Folk
- Length: 32:40
- Label: Capitol
- Producer: Voyle Gilmore

The Kingston Trio chronology
The Last Month of the Year (1960)	Make Way (1961)	Goin' Places (1961)

Make Way is the ninth album by the American folk music group the Kingston Trio, released in 1961 (see 1961 in music). It reached number two on the Billboard charts, despite there being no US singles released from the album. ("En El Agua" was released as a B-side in the US but as an A-side in Great Britain).

== Reception ==
Professional ratings
Review scores
Source	Rating
Allmusic	3.5/5 stars

In his Allmusic review, critic Bruce Eder called the album "...a beautiful if relatively low-key selection of a dozen songs, mostly traditional tunes adapted by the group" despite noting that the liveliest songs were misplaced on the album's track sequence."

== Reissues ==
- Make Way was reissued in 1992 on CD by Capitol with Goin' Places.
- In 1997, all of the tracks from Make Way were included in The Guard Years 10-CD box set issued by Bear Family Records.
- Make Way was reissued in 2001 by Collectors' Choice Music with Goin' Places. This reissue has three bonus tracks: "The Golden Spike", "The Wines of Madeira" and "Don't You Weep, Mary".

== Track listing ==
=== Side one ===
1. "En El Agua" (Antonio Fernandez)
2. "Come All You Fair and Tender Ladies" (Traditional, Dave Guard, Gretchen Guard)
3. "A Jug of Punch" (Ewan MacColl, Francis McPeake)
4. "Bonny Hielan' Laddie" (Traditional, Dave Guard, Joe Hickerson)
5. "Utawena" (Nick Reynolds, Adam Yagodka)
6. "Hard Travelin'" (Woody Guthrie)

=== Side two ===
1. "Hangman" (Traditional, Nick Reynolds, Adam Yagodka)
2. "Speckled Roan" (Jane Bowers)
3. "The River is Wide" (Traditional, Reynolds)
4. "Oh, Yes, Oh" (Traditional, Guard, Guard)
5. "Blow the Candle Out" (Tom Drake, Bob Shane)
6. "Blue Eyed Gal" (Drake, Shane, Miriam Stafford)

== Personnel ==
- Dave Guard – vocals, banjo, guitar
- Bob Shane – vocals, guitar
- Nick Reynolds – vocals, tenor guitar, bongos, conga
- David "Buck" Wheat – bass, guitar
- Mongo Santamaría – percussion on "Utawena"
- Willie "Bobo" Correa – percussion on "Utawena"

== Chart positions ==
Year	Chart	Position
1961	Billboard Pop Albums	2
