= Live at the Santa Monica Civic Auditorium =

Live album by The Kingston Trio
- Released: November 20, 2007
- Recorded: April 13–21, 1961 at the Santa Monica Civic Auditorium, Santa Monica, CA
- Genre: Folk
- Label: RichKat Records; Collectors' Choice Music
- Producer: Ron Furmanek

The Kingston Trio chronology
The Lost 1967 Album: Rarities Vol. 1 (2007)	Live at the Santa Monica Civic Auditorium (2007)	Twice Upon a Time (2008)

Live at the Santa Monica Civic Auditorium is a live album by the American folk music group The Kingston Trio, recorded in 1961 and released in 2007 (see 2007 in music).

== History ==
After completing the album Goin' Places and a scheduled foreign tour, founder Dave Guard announced his departure from the group, but continued to fulfill the group's concert commitments until a replacement could be found. This performance was the last by the Trio before Guard's replacement John Stewart joined the group.

Singer Pat Boone joined the group on stage to perform "You're Gonna Miss Me". A bonus video of the Trio performing the same song on Boone's April 1961 TV special is also included in this release.

== Reception ==
Professional ratings
Review scores
Source	Rating
Allmusic	3.5/5 stars

Writing for Allmusic, music critic Lindsay Planer wrote of the album; "The Trio's stage show—captured here at the Santa Monica Civic Auditorium on April 21, 1961—was a mixture of music and humor. And while an overt emphasis is placed upon the former, hearing the (presumably) unedited between-song banter gives modern listeners an insight into their personalities. With comments ranging from political to, at times simply silly, evidence of the Kingston Trio's obviously heartfelt camaraderie is weaved throughout the equally appealing live set. To some, a cursory glance at the tunes performed during the concert might reveal more in terms of songs not played."

== Track listing ==
1. "Introduction" – 1:33
2. "Run Molly, Run" (Bill Monroe) – 2:01
3. "Intro to Bad Man's Blunder" – 1:29
4. "Bad Man Blunder" (Lee Hays, Cisco Houston) – 3:37
5. "Intro to Come All You Fair and Tender Ladies" – 1:15
6. "Come All You Fair and Tender Ladies" (Traditional, Dave Guard, Gretchen Guard) – 3:01
7. "Intro to Bonny Hielan' Laddie" – 1:20
8. "Bonny Hielan' Laddie" (Dave Guard, Joe Hickerson) – 3:07
9. "Intro to Zombie Jamboree" – 1:34
10. "Zombie Jamboree" (Conrad Eugene Mauge Jr.) – 2:47
11. "Intro to Colorado Trail" – 0:47
12. "Colorado Trail" (Lee Hays, Carl Sandburg) – 2:54
13. "Intro to You're Gonna Miss Me" – 2:42
14. "You're Gonna Miss Me" (John Cohen, Dave Guard, Tom Paley, Mike Seeger) – 3:19
15. "Intro to the Merry Minuet" – 2:03
16. "The Merry Minuet" (Harnick) – 2:03
17. "Go Where I Send Thee" (Guard, Reynolds, Shane) – 3:08
18. "Intro to Coplas" – 1:28
19. "Coplas" (Dave Guard, Traditional) – 3:26
20. "Intro to Guardo el Lobo" – 2:11
21. "Guardo el Lobo" (Erich Schwandt) – 2:42
22. "You Don't Knock" (Roebuck "Pops" Staples, William Westbrook) – 3:21
23. "They Call the Wind Maria" (Alan Jay Lerner, Frederick Loewe) – 4:25
24. "Intro to When the Saints Go Marching In" – 1:30
25. "When the Saints Go Marching In" (Traditional) – 5:40
26. "You're Gonna Miss Me" (video)

== Personnel ==
- Dave Guard – vocals, guitar, banjo
- Bob Shane – vocals, guitar
- Nick Reynolds – vocals, tenor guitar, bongos, conga
- David "Buck" Wheat – double bass
