= Looking for the Sunshine =

Studio album by The Kingston Trio
- Released: 1983
- Recorded: 1982
- Studio: Wizzard Recording Studio, Hollywood, California and Eddy Offord Studio, Atlanta, Georgia
- Genre: Folk
- Label: Xeres
- Producer: Mike Settle

The Kingston Trio chronology
Aspen Gold (1979)	Looking for the Sunshine (1983)	Everybody's Talking (1989)

Looking for the Sunshine is an album by the American folk music group the Kingston Trio, released in 1983 (see 1983 in music). It was the first release comprising mostly new material since Children of the Morning in 1966. The album had little distribution, failed to chart and the two singles released from it were used for promotional purposes only. It is out of print.

== History ==
Through the years following Bob Shane's acquisition of the Kingston Trio name in 1976, the personnel in the group changed several times, though Shane and George Grove remained constants. Shane's Kingston Trio relied heavily on a "greatest hits formula" augmented by a number of other songs acquired through the years that fans had accepted as part of the group's repertoire. Roger Gambill died shortly after the release of Looking for the Sunshine and was replaced by Bob Haworth. In March 2004, a month after his seventieth birthday, Shane suffered a debilitating heart attack that forced him into a retirement from touring and performing for the first time in 47 years. Future releases after Looking for the Sunshine by the various line-ups of the group (including the return of original member Nick Reynolds) would consist of recordings of live performances and a large number of compilations of their Capitol and Decca recordings.

Professional ratings
Review scores
Source	Rating
Allmusic	3/5 stars

== Track listing ==
=== Side one ===
1. "Looking for the Sunshine" (Mickey Newbury)
2. "Hawaiian Nights" (Harold Payne, Edgar Pease, Mike Scarpiello)
3. "I Like to Hear the Rain" (Alex Harvey)
4. "Big Ship Glory" (Charlie Merriam)
5. "Sometimes Love Is Better When It's Gone" (Mike Settle)
6. "I'm a Rake and a Ramblin' Boy"

=== Side two ===
1. "The World Needs a Melody" (Johnny Slate, Larry Henley, H. Delaughter)
2. "The Long Black Veil" (Danny Dill, Marijohn Wilkin)
3. "Will You Love Me If I Don't do Coke?" (Harold Payne)
4. "Cortelia Clark" (Mickey Newbury)
5. "A Rolling Stone" (Stan Wilson)
6. "Easy to Arrange" (Jak Kelly)

== Personnel ==
- Bob Shane – vocals, guitar
- Roger Gambill – vocals, guitar
- George Grove – vocals, banjo, guitar
- Stan Kaess – bass
- Tom Green – drums, percussion
- Ben Schubert – fiddle, banjo, tenor guitar
- John Sebastian – autoharp, harmonica
- Mike Settle – piano ("Looking for the Sunshine")
- Jane Watson – harmony vocals ("I Like to Hear the Rain")
- Brian Mann – synthesizer ("Hawaiian Nights")
- Wilkins Hy Ching – ukulele ("Hawaiian Nights")
- David Benoit – piano ("The World Needs a Melody")

== Production notes ==
- Mike Settle – producer
- Nick Heyl – executive producer, producer ("Will You Love Me If I Don't do Coke?")
- Jane Heyl – executive producer
- Hank Doing – engineer
- Eddy Offord – engineer
- Ross Neurer – photography, art director
- Nick Reynolds – liner notes
