= Live at the Crazy Horse =

Live album by The Kingston Trio
- Released: 1994
- Recorded: The Crazy Horse Steak House & Saloon, Santa Ana, California
- Genre: Folk
- Length: 68:00
- Label: Silverwolf
- Producer: George Grove

The Kingston Trio chronology
Live at Newport (1994)	Live at the Crazy Horse (1994)	The Capitol Years (1995)

Live at the Crazy Horse is a live album by the American folk music group the Kingston Trio, released in 1994 (see 1994 in music). The group consisted of the line up of Bob Shane, George Grove, and Nick Reynolds. Reynolds had left the group in 1967 and returned in 1988.

== Reception ==
Professional ratings
Review scores
Source	Rating
Allmusic	3/5 stars

Allmusic critic Bruce Eder wrote of the live album "This may be the latter-day Kingston Trio, but two of the original members — Bob Shane and Nick Reynolds — are here, along with 20-year veteran George Grove, and they do sound very good... The singing, all un-retouched, is superb, and the playing is spot-on — the trio has aged well, they've retained a sense of humor about themselves and what they do, and a good deal od spontaneity, despite the 40 years of history behind them at the point from which this show dates."

== Reissues ==
There are multiple releases of this album using the same title and also under different titles with different track listings. Release dates are given as November 1994 for the Silverwolf issue and January 1994 for Xeres Records. The difference between these two are the track times and the Kris Kristofferson song "Gypsy Rose and I Don't Give a Curse" is titled as "Seven Starving Sailors" (the first lines of the song). Silverwolf also reissued it on CD in 2006 combined with Dave Guard's solo album Up and In. Some of the tracks were also included on the Silverwolf releases The Extreme Kingston Trio (2001) and The Best of the Kingston Trio. (2007)

== Track listing ==
Original Silverwolf Records track listing and credits.

1. "Hard Ain't It Hard'" (Woody Guthrie) – 2:34
2. "Three Jolly Coachmen" (Dave Guard) – 1:54
3. "Chilly Winds" (John Stewart, John Phillips) - 3:02
4. "Sinking of the Reuben James" (Guthrie) – 2:50
5. "Gypsy Rose and I Don't Give a Curse" (Kris Kristofferson) – 2:51
6. "The Work Song" (John Stevens) – 2:36
7. "Rolling River" (Brownie Macintosh) – 1:58
8. "M.T.A." (Bess Lomax Hawes, Jacqueline Steiner) - 3:02
9. "Jocko and the Trapeze Lady" (Dick Feller) – 5:14
10. "They Call the Wind Maria" (Alan Jay Lerner, Frederick Loewe) – 1:44
11. "Ann" (Billy Edd Wheeler) – 2:37
12. "High Heeled Shoes" (John Hadley) – 3:00
13. "Hawaiian Nights" (Harold Payne, Edgar Pease, Mike Scarpiello) – 2:50
14. "Worried Man" (Dave Guard, Tom Glazer) – 2:23
15. "The Way Old Friends Do" (Björn Ulvaeus, Benny Andersson) – 2:16
16. "Reverend Mr. Black" (Jerry Leiber, Mike Stoller, Billy Edd Wheeler) – 4:00

== Personnel ==
- Bob Shane – vocals, guitar
- Nick Reynolds – vocals, tenor guitar, conga
- George Grove – vocals, banjo, guitar
- Paul Gabrielson – bass
- Tom Green – percussion
- Ben Schubert – fiddle, electric tenor guitar
- Frank Sanchez – congas, bongos

== Production notes ==
- George Grove – producer, executive producer, engineer
- Bob Shane – executive producer
- Nick Heyl – executive producer
- Phil Johnson – engineer
