= It Was a Very Good Year =

1961 song by Ervin Drake

Single by Frank Sinatra

from the album September of My Years
- B-side: "Moment to Moment"
- Released: December 1965
- Recorded: 1965
- Studio: United Western Recorders, United A
- Genre: Pop
- Length: 4:25
- Label: Reprise
- Songwriter: Ervin Drake
- Producer: Sonny Burke

Frank Sinatra singles chronology
"Ev'rybody Has the Right to Be Wrong! (At Least Once)" (1965)	"It Was a Very Good Year" (1965)	"Strangers in the Night" (1966)

"It Was a Very Good Year" is a song composed by Ervin Drake in 1961 and originally recorded by Bob Shane of the Kingston Trio for their album Goin' Places. It was made famous by Frank Sinatra's version in D minor from his album September of my Years, which won the Grammy Award for Best Male Vocal Performance at the 8th Annual Grammy Awards in 1966 and became Sinatra's first number one Adult Contemporary single, also peaking at No. 28 on the Billboard Hot 100. Gordon Jenkins won a Grammy Award for his arrangement for the orchestra, which he also conducted.

== Description ==
The nostalgic and melancholic song recounts the type of girls with whom the narrator had relationships at various years in his life: when he was 17, "small-town girls ... on the village green"; at 21, "city girls who lived up the stair"; at 35, "blue-blooded girls of independent means". Each of these years he calls "very good". In the song's final verse, the singer reflects that he is older, and in the autumn of his years, and he thinks back on his entire life "as vintage wine". All of these romances were sweet to him, like wines from very good vintage years.

== Composition ==
Ervin Drake composed the song in 1961 at the suggestion of record producer Artie Mogull, who told Drake that Bob Shane of The Kingston Trio needed a solo to include in the group's upcoming album Goin' Places. Drake wrote the song in less than a day, although he had been considering employing the metaphor of life as a vintage wine in a lyric for several years prior.

Ervin Drake's inspiration to write the song was his future wife Edith Vincent Bermaine. She was a showgirl whom he had dated and eventually married twenty years after the song was written.

== Notable covers ==
- The Kingston Trio introduced the song on their album Goin' Places (1961). This is the recording that influenced Frank Sinatra to want to record his own version.
- The Modern Folk Quartet recorded it on their eponymous first album The Modern Folk Quartet (1963).
- Frank Sinatra recorded it for his September of My Years album (1965) and released a stripped-down performance on his Sinatra at the Sands live album (1966) (#22 CAN)
- The Turtles had a Canadian hit with their version (Quality 1791X) in early 1966, reaching #7.
- Ray Charles included it on his 2004 Grammy winning album Genius Loves Company as a duet with Willie Nelson.
- Female singers Della Reese and Marlena Shaw covered the song with a female viewpoint in the lyric about their male former lovers. Reese's cover came out in 1966 and Shaw's from her album Take a Bite was released in 1979. Reese's version was a charting single on the US Billboard Hot 100, peaking at number 99 in 1966.
- The song was covered by Seal on his 2017 album Standards.

== In popular media ==
- In 1971, Michael Jackson sang a parody of this song in a skit with Diana Ross during the television special Diana!, which aired on the ABC-TV network.
- Frank Sinatra's version of the song is featured in the Spike Lee film Jungle Fever (1991).
- In the 1993 Simpsons episode "Duffless", Homer sings a version with the lyrics "When I was seventeen, I drank some very good beer..."
- The song is featured in the opening episode of The Sopranos second season, Guy Walks into a Psychiatrist's Office...
- In 2005, They Might Be Giants parodied this song on their first podcast.

== See also ==
- List of number-one adult contemporary singles of 1966 (U.S.)
