= Ervin Drake =

American songwriter (1919–2015)

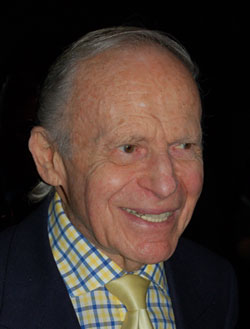
- Drake in 2006

Background information
- Born: Ervin Maurice Druckman; April 3, 1919; New York City, U.S.
- Died: January 15, 2015 (aged 95) Great Neck, New York, U.S.
- Occupation: Songwriter
- Years active: 1931–2014

Ervin Drake (born Ervin Maurice Druckman; April 3, 1919 – January 15, 2015) was an American songwriter whose works include such American Songbook standards as "I Believe" and "It Was a Very Good Year". He wrote in a variety of styles and his work has been recorded by musicians around the world. In 1983, he was inducted into the Songwriters Hall of Fame.

== Biography ==
Born in New York City, Drake had his first song published at age 12, in 1931. The son of Jewish immigrants Max Druckman and Pearl Cohen, he attended Townsend Harris High School in the borough of Manhattan, graduating in 1935, and went on to receive a Bachelor of Arts degree in social science from the City College of New York in 1940. His elder brother, Milton Drake, also became a songwriter, with work including "Java Jive" and "Nina Never Knew"; and his younger brother Arnold Drake, became a writer for DC Comics, Marvel Comics, and others, as well as an author and playwright.

Drake wrote the lyrics for "Perdido", composed by trombonist Juan Tizol, a member of Duke Ellington's orchestra, and first recorded (by Ellington) in 1944. Besides composing music and lyrics for dozens of pieces he was also a television producer and worked with performers including Jackie Gleason and Milton Berle. Among his best known songs is "I Believe", the first hit song ever introduced on television, which was written for and introduced by Jane Froman on her television show in 1953, and became a number-one hit for Frankie Laine, holding the record for number of non-consecutive weeks spent at number one in the UK. It has also been recorded by many other artists including Barbra Streisand, Elvis Presley, and Paul Anka.

Drake wrote the words and music for "It Was a Very Good Year" in 1961 when a publisher friend told him that Bob Shane of the folk and pop music group the Kingston Trio would be in the publisher's office the next morning, and the publisher asked Drake to write a song for Shane to sing solo. Shane recorded it for the album Goin' Places and other folk performers covered it as well. In a 2009 interview, Drake said that in 1965, Frank Sinatra had heard the Kingston Trio recording on his car radio as he was driving to his home in Palm Springs and immediately pulled over in the middle of the night to a gas station and pay phone. Sinatra called his producer Gordon Jenkins and told Jenkins that he wanted an arrangement with plenty of strings and possibly an oboe as well. When Sinatra arrived back in L.A. he recorded it for his career comeback album September of My Years. That recording became a Top 30 single on the U.S. Billboard Hot 100 in 1966 and made No.1 on the Adult Contemporary chart.

As a lyricist, Drake wrote the words for the jazz standard "Good Morning Heartache". It has been recorded by many artists, including Billie Holiday and later Diana Ross when she portrayed Holiday in the movie Lady Sings the Blues. Gloria Estefan also recorded it for her 2013 album The Standards and sang it to Drake and wife Edith on live TV on CBS This Morning. Following the performance, Drake, Gloria and the two hosts bantered a while about love and love lost.

Drake was the founding president of American Guild of Authors and Composers from 1973 to 1982, which has since changed its name to Songwriters Guild of America.

On January 15, 2015, Drake died at his home in Great Neck, New York due to complications from bladder cancer shortly before his 96th birthday.

== Awards and honors ==
Drake received several honorary doctorates and achievement awards, as well as being inducted into the Songwriter's Hall of Fame in 1983.

On June 30, 2013, Five Towns College named the Ervin Drake Popular Music Center after Drake.

== Selected works ==
=== Songs ===
- "Now I Have Everything"
- "A Room without Windows"
- "Bachelor Girl"
- "I Believe"
- "Good Morning Heartache"
- "It Was a Very Good Year"
- "The Rickety Rickshaw Man"
- "I Wuv A Rabbit"
- "Who Are These Strangers"
- "I'm A Card Carrying Bleeding Heart Liberal"
- "One God"
- "Lying Beneath A Scrubby Palmetto"
- "I've Never Had The Pleasure"

English-language lyrics written for foreign-language songs

- "Al di là"
- "Perdido"
- "Tico-Tico"
- "Quando Quando Quando"

=== Broadway ===
- Heads or Tails (1947) - play - co-playwright with Hans Lengsfelder
- What Makes Sammy Run? (1964) - musical - composer and lyricist
- Her First Roman (1968) - composer, lyricist, and bookwriter
- Sophisticated Ladies (1981) - revue - featured songwriter for "Perdido" with Juan Tizol and Hans Lengsfelder
- Motown the Musical (2013) - featured songwriter for "Good Morning Heartache"
- Billie Holiday (2014) featured songwriter for "Good Morning Heartache"
