= The Lost 1967 Album: Rarities Vol. 1 =

Studio album by The Kingston Trio
- Released: July 2, 2007
- Recorded: 1967
- Genre: Folk
- Label: RichKat Records through Collectors' Choice
- Producer: Frank Weber, Ron Furmanek

The Kingston Trio chronology
The Final Concert (2007)	The Lost 1967 Album: Rarities Vol. 1 (2007)	Live at the Santa Monica Civic Auditorium (2007)

The Lost 1967 Album: Rarities Vol. 1 is an album by the American folk music group The Kingston Trio, recorded in 1967 and released in 2007 (see 2007 in music).

== History ==
The Trio (consisting of Bob Shane, Nick Reynolds and John Stewart) had disbanded after their final concert in June 1967 at the hungry i club in San Francisco. This album of mostly contemporary covers was recorded but never released and contains studio chatter and song rehearsals. The original recording was produced by Frank Werber, the Trio's manager since their inception. Reynolds has stated that this was a private rehearsal tape and he did not approve of its release. The lead vocals are dominated by Reynolds and Stewart.

Collector's Choice released another volume of unreleased recordings in 2008 titled Turning Like Forever: Rarities Vol. 2.

== Reception ==
Professional ratings
Review scores
Source	Rating
Allmusic	3.5/5 stars

Writing for Allmusic, music critic Lindsay Planer wrote of the album; "this pair of early 1967 sessions that yielded thoroughly excellent covers of some well-known contemporaneous folk-rock sides."

== Track listing ==
1. "Love Me Not Tomorrow" (John Stewart) – 2:32
2. "Homeward Bound" (Paul Simon) – 2:30
3. "The Other Side of This Life" (Fred Neil) – 2:17
4. "The Dolphins" (Neil) – 3:38
5. "To Try for the Sun" (Donovan) – 2:06
6. "Elusive Butterfly" (Bob Lind) – 2:21
7. "Nashville Cats" (John Sebastian) – 3:02
8. "Darcy Farrow" (Steve Gillette, Tom Campbell) – 3:56
9. "Don't Make Promises" (Tim Hardin) – 3:10
10. "Running out of Tomorrow's" (Stewart) – 3:55
11. "Catch the Wind" (Donovan) – 2:19
12. "Reason to Believe" (Hardin) – 2:24
13. "Fun with the Trio in the Studio" – 8:34

== Personnel ==
- Bob Shane – vocals, guitar
- Nick Reynolds – vocals, tenor guitar
- John Stewart – vocals, banjo, guitar

== Production notes ==
- Frank Werber – original recording producer
- Ron Furmanek – producer, compilation, mixing
- Gordon Anderson – executive producer
- Peter Abbott – engineer
- Joe Gannon – engineer
- Hank McGill – engineer
- Ben Blake – liner notes
- Tom DeLisle – liner notes
- Henry Diltz – photography
