= Turning Like Forever: Rarities Vol. 2 =

Compilation album by The Kingston Trio
- Released: July 29, 2008
- Recorded: September 14, 1963 – January 5, 1967
- Genre: Folk
- Label: RichKat Records through Collectors' Choice
- Producer: Frank Werber, Ron Furmanek (Compilation)

The Kingston Trio chronology
Twice Upon a Time (2008)	Turning Like Forever: Rarities Vol. 2 (2008)

Turning Like Forever: Rarities Vol. 2 is an album by the American folk music group The Kingston Trio, released in 2008 (see 2008 in music). It contains previously unreleased material as well as alternative takes and many promotional radio spots and advertising endorsements. All material is taken from their post-Capitol Records years.

Collector's Choice also issued another volume of unreleased recordings in 2007 titled The Lost 1967 Album: Rarities Vol. 1.

== Reception ==
Professional ratings
Review scores
Source	Rating
Allmusic	4/5 stars

Writing for Allmusic, music critic Lindsay Planer wrote that the album includes "several superior sides were left to languish in the vaults for decades."

== Track listing ==
1. "Love's Been Good to Me" (Rod McKuen) – 2:52
2. "Road Song" (Mason Williams) – 2:48
3. "Love Poem, Pt. 1" (Williams) – 0:52
4. "Stories of Old" (John Stewart) – 3:16
5. "Little Play Soldiers" (Martin Cooper) – 2:23
6. "January Summer" (Stewart) – 3:09
7. "Love Comes a Trickling Down" (Jonathan Harris) – 2:53
8. "The Summer's Long" (McKuen) – 2:13
9. "Go Tell Roger" (Stewart) – 1:43
10. "Love Poem, Pt. 2" (Williams) – 0:53
11. "If I Had a Ship" (Williams) – 3:31
12. "When You've Been Away for a Long Time" (Stewart) – 3:09
13. "To Try for the Sun" (Donovan) – 2:50
14. "Adieu Foulard" – 2:36
15. "Children of the Morning" (Stewart) – 3:24
- Eight radio interviews and 13 radio spots follow.

== Personnel ==
- Bob Shane – vocals, guitar
- Nick Reynolds – vocals, tenor guitar
- John Stewart – vocals, banjo, guitar
- Dean Reilly – bass

== Production notes ==
- Frank Werber – original recording producer
- Ron Furmanek – producer, compilation, mixing, remastering
- Hank McGill – engineer
- Tom DeLisle – liner notes
