= Treasure Chest (The Kingston Trio album) =

Compilation album by The Kingston Trio
- Released: January 28, 1993
- Genre: Folk
- Label: Folk Era

The Kingston Trio chronology
Capitol Collectors Series (1990)	Treasure Chest (1993)	An Evening with The Kingston Trio (1994)

Treasure Chest is a compilation album by the American folk music group the Kingston Trio, released in 1993 (see 1993 in music). It consists of B-sides to Kingston Trio singles, alternate takes, and songs recorded during album sessions by the Guard-Shane-Reynolds lineup, but rejected for release.

These tracks were previously released on the LP titled Hidden Treasures and the LP titled Rediscovered. A similar collection of songs featuring the Shane-Reynolds-Stewart lineup from the same two LPs was released on CD with the title Tune Up.

Professional ratings
Review scores
Source	Rating
Allmusic	3/5 stars

== Track listing ==
1. "Blue Tattoo" (Kenny Jacobson, Rhoda Roberts) – 2:43
2. "Adieu to My Island" (Travis Edmonson) – 2:44
3. "Sea Fever" (Jane Bowers, Irving Burgess) – 2:59
4. "Sail Away Ladies" (Traditional) – 2:30
5. "Scarlet Ribbons" (Evelyn Danzig, Jack Segal) – 2:20
6. "Oh Mary" – 2:17
7. "World's Last Authentic Playboys" (Bill Loughborough, David "Buck" Wheat) – 2:44
8. "Ruby Red" (Lee Pockriss, Paul Vance) – 2:21
9. "Home from the Hill" (Mack David, Bronisław Kaper) – 3:57
10. "Sally" (Woody Guthrie) – 2:38
11. "Oh Cindy" (Traditional) – 1:43
12. "Wines of Madeira" (Traditional) – 3:02
13. "Golden Spike" (Traditional) – 1:50
14. "Green Grasses" (John Stewart) – 2:10

== Personnel ==
- Dave Guard – vocals, banjo, guitar
- Bob Shane – vocals, guitar
- Nick Reynolds – vocals, tenor guitar, conga
- David "Buck" Wheat – double bass
