= Goin' Places (The Kingston Trio album) =

Studio album by The Kingston Trio
- Released: June 5, 1961
- Recorded: January 1961
- Studio: Capitol Studio B (Hollywood)
- Genre: Folk
- Length: 30:46
- Label: Capitol
- Producer: Voyle Gilmore

The Kingston Trio chronology
Make Way (1961)	Goin' Places (1961)	Close-Up (1961)

Singles from Goin' Places
- 1. "You're Gonna Miss Me"/"En El Agua" Released: 1961

Goin' Places is the tenth album by the American folk music group The Kingston Trio, released in 1961 (see 1961 in music). It peaked at number three on the Billboard charts and spent 41 weeks in the Top 40. The lead-off single was "You're Gonna Miss Me" (a new arrangement of "Frankie and Johnny") which failed to chart. Its B-side was "En El Agua" from the earlier Make Way album. Goin' Places was the last album recorded with founder Dave Guard as a member.

== History ==
The day after the completion of the Goin' Places recording sessions, the Trio embarked on their first foreign tour. After their return, Guard announced his intention to resign from the group. Guard stated in numerous interviews he left the Trio for two main reasons: he was upset with a discrepancy in publishing royalties and he felt the Trio needed to grow musically. The other members, Nick Reynolds and Bob Shane, disagreed on both counts. Guard stayed on to fulfill the group's concert commitments through November and Reynolds and Shane, having decided to keep the group going, hired John Stewart as Guard's replacement. Guard later formed the folk-oriented group Whiskeyhill Singers — which disbanded after one Capitol album and virtually no success — before moving on to other endeavors.

In an interview for Frets magazine in 1984 and included in the liner notes to The Guard Years, Reynolds stated: "Basically, David wanted to take it on to another level. Bobby and I were just hangin' out, having a good time. We were happy with the format and working way too hard to consider sitting down and learning how to read music... We were killing ourselves as it was with the work, and David was insisting that we take lessons. He was also upset about the publishing thing, and didn't think people were taking care of business, and he became dissatisfied with everything from photography to the management. It might have been an overreaction on Dave's part, but I believe that he honestly wanted to take it to a higher plane..."

The Trio's long-time bassist, David "Buck" Wheat is pictured with the group on the cover.

The final live performances of the original trio were released in 2007 as Live at the Santa Monica Auditorium.

== Reception ==
Professional ratings
Review scores
Source	Rating
Allmusic	3/5 stars

Music critic Bruce Eder wrote for Allmusic that the original Trio's final album "shows no sign of the group slackening its standards or rushing through the material." and while praising all the tracks, singled out "Razors in the Air" as "a delightfully played and sung piece of pure fun that gives Dave Guard, in particular, an opportunity to show off his prodigious banjo skills before leaving the lineup of the group he founded."

== Reissues ==
- Goin' Places was reissued in 1992 on CD by Capitol with Make Way.
- In 1984, Mobile Fidelity Sound Lab reissued Goin' Places on a limited edition cassette.
- In 1997, all of the tracks from Goin' Places were included in The Guard Years 10-CD box set issued by Bear Family Records.
- Goin' Places was reissued in 2001 by Collectors' Choice Music with Make Way. This reissue has three bonus tracks: "The Golden Spike", "The Wines of Madeira" and "Don't You Weep, Mary".

== Track listing ==
"Coast of California" and "This Land Is Your Land" were originally recorded during the String Along sessions but did not appear for a year until the release of Goin' Places. The former song's melody is "Si me quieres escribir", a Republican song from the Spanish Civil War with the lyrics rewritten.

=== Side one ===
1. "You're Gonna Miss Me" (John Cohen, Dave Guard, Tom Paley, Mike Seeger)
2. "Pastures of Plenty" (Woody Guthrie)
3. "Coast of California" (Jane Bowers, Guard)
4. "It Was a Very Good Year" (Ervin Drake)
5. "Guardo el Lobo" (Mateo Flecha el Viejo (1556); Erich Schwandt)
6. "Razors in the Air" (Schwandt)

=== Side two ===
1. "Billy Goat Hill" (George Arno, James Day)
2. "This Land Is Your Land" (Guthrie)
3. "Run Molly, Run" (Bill Monroe)
4. "Senora" (Bowers, Guard)
5. "Lemon Tree" (Will Holt)
6. "You Don't Knock" (Roebuck "Pops" Staples, William Westbrook)

== Personnel ==
- Dave Guard – vocals, banjo, guitar
- Bob Shane – vocals, guitar
- Nick Reynolds – vocals, tenor guitar, bongos, conga
- David "Buck" Wheat – bass, guitar

== Chart positions ==
Year	Chart	Position
1961	Billboard Pop Albums	3
