= That's Fats: A Tribute to Fats Domino =

Compilation album by Various artists
- Released: 1996
- Recorded: December 10, 1949 – June 16, 1992
- Genre: Rock, blues, rhythm and blues
- Label: Capitol
- Producer: Bruce Harris; Steve Kolanjian; Ron Furmanek

Various artists chronology
That's Fats: A Tribute to Fats Domino (1996)	Goin' Home: A Tribute to Fats Domino (2007)

That's Fats: A Tribute to Fats Domino is a 1996 tribute album to Fats Domino, released by Capitol Records, and being a collection of existing cover versions by various artists of songs made popular by Fats Domino. Three Fats Domino performances are also included in the collection.

== Track listing and performer credits ==
1. "The Fat Man" Fats Domino
2. "All by Myself" Johnny Burnette
3. "I'm in Love Again" Ricky Nelson
4. "Sick and Tired" Chris Kenner
5. "Please Don't Leave Me" The Four Lovers
6. "Let the Four Winds Blow" Roy Brown
7. "I Can't Go On (Rosalie)" Dion & the Belmonts
8. "Honey Chile" Dave Bartholomew
9. "Ain't That a Shame" Fats Domino
10. "Blue Monday" The Crickets
11. "Going to the River" Johnny Rivers
12. "I Want to Walk You Home" Sandy Nelson
13. "I'm Ready" The Band
14. "What a Price" George Thorogood & the Destroyers
15. "Going Home Tomorrow" Dr. John
16. "Ain't That a Shame" Cheap Trick
17. "Big Fat (The Fat Man)" Canned Heat
18. "I'm Walkin'" Fats Domino
19. "Dedicated to Domino" Al Robinson

== Other credits ==
- Bruce Harris Executive Producer
- David Eno Project Coordinator
- Steve Kolanjian Liner Notes, Compilation Producer
- Ron Furmanek Remixing, Compilation Producer, Research
- Kevin Reeves Remixing, Digital Remastering
- Henry Marquez Art Direction
- Randall Martin Design
