= The Best of the Capitol Masters: Selections from "The Legend and the Legacy" Box Set =

The Best of the Capitol Masters: Selections From "The Legend and the Legacy" Box Set

Greatest hits album by Les Paul, Mary Ford
- Released: July 20, 1992
- Genre: Jazz
- Length: 46:27
- Label: Capitol

Professional ratings
Review scores
Source	Rating
AllMusic	5/5 stars

The Best of the Capitol Masters: Selections From "The Legend and the Legacy" Box Set is a compilation album by American jazz guitarist Les Paul and Mary Ford that was released in 1992. It is a single CD with tracks from the four-disc box set The Legend and the Legacy.

== Track listing ==
1. "Lover" (Lorenz Hart, Richard Rodgers) – 2:49
2. "Nola" (Arndt) – 2:36
3. "Tennessee Waltz" (King, Stewart) – 3:09
4. "Mockin' Bird Hill" (Horton) – 2:18
5. "How High the Moon" (Hamilton, Lewis) – 2:08
6. "The World Is Waiting for the Sunrise" (Lockhart, Seitz) – 2:12
7. "Whispering" (Coburn, Rose, Schoenberger) – 2:01
8. "Just One More Chance" (Coslow, Johnston) – 1:55
9. "Tiger Rag" (DaCosta, Edwards, LaRocca) – 2:07
10. "In the Good Old Summertime" (Evans, Shields) – 2:10
11. "Meet Mister Callaghan" (Eric Spear) – 1:51
12. "Lady of Spain" (Damerell, Evans, Hargreaves) – 1:53
13. "My Baby's Comin' Home" (Feller, Grady, Leavitt) – 2:26
14. "Bye Bye Blues" (Bennett, Gray, Hamm, Lown) – 2:03
15. "I'm Sitting on Top of the World" (Henderson, Lewis, Young) – 2:17
16. "Vaya Con Dios (May God Be with You)" (James, Pepper, Russell) – 2:53
17. "I Really Don't Want to Know" (Barnes, Robertson) – 2:52
18. "I'm a Fool to Care" (Daffan) – 2:55
19. "Whither Thou Goest" (Singer) – 2:09
20. "Hummingbird" (Robertson) – 2:38

== Personnel ==
- Les Paul – guitar, arranger
- Mary Ford – vocals
