= Children of the Morning =

Studio album by The Kingston Trio
- Released: May 1966
- Recorded: 1966
- Studio: Columbus Recording Studio, San Francisco, California
- Genre: Folk
- Label: Decca
- Producer: Frank Werber

The Kingston Trio chronology
Somethin' Else (1965)	Children of the Morning (1966)	Once Upon a Time (1969)

Singles from Children of the Morning
- 1. "Norwegian Wood"/"Put Your Money Away" Released: 1966; 2. "The Spinnin' of the World"/"A Little Soul is Born" Released: 1966; 3. "Lock All the Windows"/"Hit and Run" Released: 1966

Children of the Morning is an album by the American folk music group the Kingston Trio, released in 1966 (see 1966 in music). It was their last album on the Decca label. Three singles were released from the album and all were commercial flops, as was the album. The singles were: "Norwegian Wood" b/w "Put Your Money Away", "The Spinnin' of the World" b/w "A Little Soul is Born" and "Lock All the Windows" b/w "Hit and Run".

== History ==
Since 1964, the Kingston Trio had been having continual problems adapting to the changing music scene around them. Their records neither sold nor charted as highly as during their peak years, and after '64 did not make the charts at all. Prior to the release of Children of the Morning, the trio had decided to disband in one year after a tour and another album. Decca declined to release the album they recorded although it was eventually released on Tetragrammaton Records. It was not released until 1969. When the tour ended, John Stewart began a solo career, Nick Reynolds retired from the music business (though eventually he would return to the Trio) and Bob Shane attempted a solo career before re-forming the group as The New Kingston Trio.

The album was recorded to fulfill the group's contract with Decca. Stewart wrote and sang the majority of the songs on the album. While he and Reynolds considered it some of their best work (although they later criticized the mixing), Shane did not, and didn't fully participate in the recording or the release. He didn't care for Stewart's songs and left it to Reynolds to approve the track list without his (Shane's) input.

The Trio's final release on Decca was the single "Texas Across the River" from the movie of the same name, backed with a Bob Dylan song, "Babe, You've Been on My Mind".

== Reception ==
Professional ratings
Review scores
Source	Rating
Allmusic	3/5 stars

Allmusic critic Bruce Eder wrote the album "doesn't really sound much like a Kingston Trio album — there's relatively little banjo, and the mood is more the introspective one of a singer/songwriter than an upbeat folk trio."

== Reissues ==
- Children of the Morning was reissued on a remastered CD in 1996 on the Folk Era label. Four bonus tracks were included from Somethin' Else.
- In 2000, all of the tracks from Children of the Morning were included in The Stewart Years 10-CD box set issued by Bear Family Records.
- Children of the Morning was reissued on CD in 2002 by Folk Era along with the rest of their Decca releases on The Decca Years.

== Track listing ==
All songs by John Stewart unless otherwise noted.

=== Side one ===
1. "Children of the Morning" – 2:41
2. "Hit and Run" – 2:15
3. "When You've Been Away for a Long Time" – 3:07
4. "Lei Pakalana" (Samuel F. Omar) – 2:16
5. "Gaze on Other Heavens" – 2:36
6. "A Taste of Honey" (Bobby Scott, Ric Marlow) – 1:44
7. "Norwegian Wood (This Bird Has Flown)" (John Lennon, Paul McCartney) – 2:21
8. "Put Your Money Away" – 2:47
9. "Lock All the Windows" – 3:16
10. "Less of Me" (Glen Campbell) – 2:25
11. "The Spinnin' of the World" – 2:02
12. "A Little Soul Is Born" – 2:56
  1996 reissue bonus tracks:
13. "Where Are You Going Little Boy?" – 2:23
14. "Go Tell Roger" (Stewart, Randy Cierley) – 1:50
15. "Red River Shore" (Arranged by Jack Splittard, Cierley) – 2:32
16. "Runaway Song" – 2:03

== Personnel ==
- Bob Shane – vocals, guitar
- Nick Reynolds – vocals, tenor guitar
- John Stewart – vocals, banjo, guitar
- Dean Reilly – bass, Flugelhorn

== Production notes ==
- Frank Werber – producer
- Hank McGill – engineer
- John Stewart – liner notes
