= Bill Zorn =

American folk musician

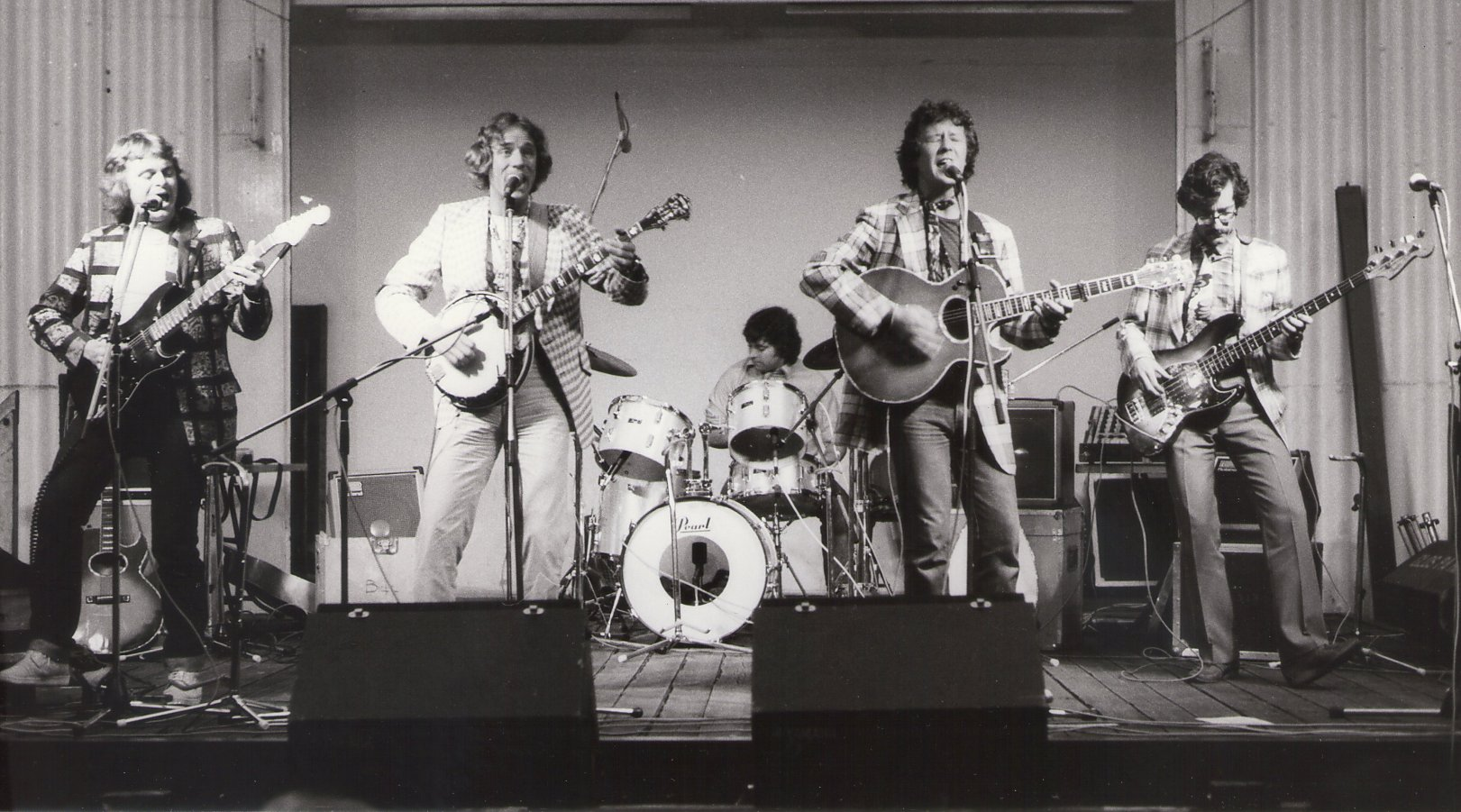
- Arizona Smoke Revue, Greenwich, UK, 1982; Bill Zorn second from left, on banjo

Background information
- Born: William Zorn; May 18, 1948 (age 77); Bridgeport, Connecticut
- Genres: Folk, pop
- Occupation: Musician
- Instruments: Vocals, Guitar, Banjo

William Zorn (born May 18, 1948) is an American folk music singer, banjo player, and guitarist who was a member of The New Christy Minstrels, The Limeliters, and The Kingston Trio, as well as lesser known groups The Windjammers (sometimes styled The Win'jammers) and Arizona Smoke Review.

== Early life ==
Zorn was born in Bridgeport, Connecticut, to Lillian and Edward Zorn, and has three brothers. The family moved from Connecticut to Pennsylvania, then Ohio until finally settling in Phoenix, Arizona. Zorn attended Arizona State University, earning a bachelor's degree in drama and music.

== Career ==
In the 1960s, Zorn, his brother Pete Zorn, and Gaylan Taylor formed a group called The Win'jammers, which performed on USO tours and appeared at the 1967 International and Universal Exposition in Montreal.

Zorn joined The New Christy Minstrels with his brother Pete in 1970, later becoming the group's musical director. In 1973, Zorn joined Bob Shane and Roger Gambill to form The New Kingston Trio.

From 1976 to 1996, Zorn lived in England, working with his brother Pete and musician Jon Benns. In 1980, he formed the folk-rock band Arizona Smoke Review, which recorded three albums. Other members of Arizona Smoke Review were Phil Beer, Paul Downes, and John Vickers, and later Pete Zorn and Steve Knightley.

Bill and Pete Zorn's song "Car 67" was a top ten hit in the United Kingdom in 1979. Zorn and Benns formed a musical duo that performed on Anglia TV in the late 1980s. His album with Jon Benns, Wake Up & Dress Funny, and album Bill Zorn's Arizona Smoke Review were reviewed in fRoots.

Zorn joined The Limeliters in 1996, taking the place of Lou Gottlieb. Leaving The Limeliters in 2003, Zorn rejoined The Kingston Trio in 2004, singing lead in the place of Bob Shane who retired after a heart attack. Zorn remained in The Kingston Trio until 2017, when Shane licensed the group's name to a new group of investors.

In 2010, Zorn released a solo album, The Bill Zorn Show. As part of The Kingston Trio, Zorn performed a live concert in Tulsa which was filmed and produced as a 1-hour PBS special.

Over the years, Zorn has been a contributor on Ashley Hutchings's albums The Guv'nor vol 1 and Sway With Me, The Albion Band's album 1990, Glenn Yarbrough's albums Chantyman and Day the Tall Ships Came, as well as The Limeliters's album Until We Get It Right, The New Christy Minstrels's compilation A Retrospective 1962–1970, and The Kingston Trio's album Born at the Right Time.
