= Come All You Fair and Tender Ladies =

American folk ballad

"Come All You Fair and Tender Ladies" (a.k.a. "Tiny Sparrow" or "Little Sparrow") (Roud #451) is an American folk music ballad, originating from the Appalachian region.

On the Vaughan Williams Memorial Library Catalogue the earliest versions are from "Ballads and Songs Collected by The Missouri Folklore Society" by Henry Marvin Belden. The version by James Ashby from Missouri was collected in 1904 and from CH Williams in 1906. John Jacob Niles collected another version in 1912.

The narrator, a woman, laments the falseness of men. She sadly remarks, "Oh if I were some little sparrow / And had I wings so I could fly / I'd fly away to my own true lover." In some versions she remembers his words "You could make me believe by the falling of your arm that the sun rose in the west".

One of the earliest recordings was Jean Ritchie in 1948 It was recorded by the Carter Family in 1952 In 1957 Peggy Seeger recorded it on the album "Peggy Seeger"

The website "Second Hand Songs" lists about 100 versions.

The website "Deaddisc.com" lists 49 under the title "Come all Ye Fair and Tender Maidens" and a further 7 under the title "Little Sparrow".

The version by Peter, Paul & Mary recorded under the title "Tiny Sparrow" for the 1963 album Moving reached number two in the Billboard charts Ian and Sylvia recorded it for their Vanguard 1967 album So Much For Dreaming. In 1967 Pete Seeger recorded it for the album Waist Deep in the Big Muddy and Other Love Songs. The Chieftains included it in 2012 on Voice of Ages.

The song has been performed by numerous other artists, including Joan Baez, Odetta, The Kingston Trio, Leon Bibb, Makem and Clancy, Emmylou Harris, Bob Dylan, Dave Van Ronk, The Rankin Family, The Country Gentlemen, Murray Head, Dolly Parton, David Bromberg, Gene Clark and Carla Olson. The song's title sometimes finds "Maidens" substituted for "Ladies", and "Come All Ye" or "Come All You" sometimes omitted.

== Versions from outside America ==
Shirley Collins recorded a song under the title "Are You Going to Leave Me?"

Another ballad, "I Wish I Wish But It's All in Vain" (Roud 495) has a similar theme. It has been collected in Scotland and Ireland.

There are "floating verses" across the songs, but the American lyrics (as Roud 451) are close to each other, and sufficiently different from the British versions (Roud 495) to make them different songs.

Spanish teenage folk-pop band Pic-Nic fronted by indie pop icon Jeanette covered the song with Spanish lyrics under the title "Negra Estrella".

== Songcatcher ==
The 2000 film Songcatcher sees a scholar travelling through Appalachia using a cylinder recording machine. The first two songs recorded are "Mattie Groves" and "Come All You Fair and Tender Ladies". In the film they are sung by Emmy Rossum. An album was released with modern singers performing the same songs. They include Rosanne Cash, Emmylou Harris and Dolly Parton.

In 2010, Marideth Sisco performed a portion of the song in the film Winter's Bone.
