= Joe Hickerson =

American folklorist and singer (1935–2025)

- Born: Joseph Charles Hickerson; October 20, 1935; Lake Forest, Illinois, U.S.
- Died: August 17, 2025 (aged 89); Portland, Oregon, U.S.
- Education: Oberlin College (BS); Indiana University Bloomington (MA)
- Occupations: Folk singer; musicologist; archivist
- Years active: 1957–2016
- Children: 1
- Musical career
- Genres: Folk; roots
- Instrument: Guitar
- Labels: Folkways Records; Folk-Legacy Records

Joseph Charles Hickerson (October 20, 1935 – August 17, 2025), known professionally as Joe Hickerson, was an American folk singer, song finder, and musicologist. He led the Archive of Folk Song at the Library of Congress from 1963 to 1998.

== Background ==
Hickerson was born in Lake Forest, Illinois, on October 20, 1935, and grew up in New Haven, Connecticut. He graduated from Oberlin College with a B.S. in physics in 1957. While at Oberlin, he performed folk music with a group called The Folksmiths. He then became a graduate student at Indiana University Bloomington, studying ethnomusicology; he earned a master's degree and was studying for a doctorate before joining the Library of Congress. During his graduate years he spent summers at Camp Woodland, a progressive folk-music summer camp in the Catskill Mountains near Phoenicia, New York, serving as a counselor in 1959 and as the camp's folk-music director in 1960.

== Career ==
For 35 years (1963–1998), Hickerson was Librarian and Director of the Archive of Folk Song at the American Folklife Center of the Library of Congress. Hickerson was a lecturer, researcher, and performer, especially in New York, Michigan, and the Chicago area.

In 1958, with the Folksmiths, Hickerson participated in the first LP recording of "Kumbayah", having learned it from Tony Saletan. In 1960, Hickerson added two verses to the original version of "Where Have All the Flowers Gone?" created and recorded in 1958 by Pete Seeger, establishing a circular form for the song that became a standard that many others recorded. Along with Dave Guard, Hickerson is credited with the creation, also in 1960, of the Kingston Trio's version of "Bonny Hielan' Laddie".

== Personal life and death ==
Hickerson was married and divorced twice and had a son. In later years, he was in a relationship with Ruth Bolliger and moved from the Washington, D.C. area to Portland, Oregon in 2013 to live closer to her.

Hickerson died at a care home in Portland on August 17, 2025, at the age of 89.

== Discography ==
- We've Got Some Singing To Do (1958) The Folksmiths, featuring Joe Hickerson Folkways Records F-2407
- Joe Hickerson With a Gathering of Friends (1970) Folk-Legacy Records
- Drive Dull Care Away Volumes 1 & 2 (1976) Folk-Legacy Records

== Filmography ==
- The Wobblies 1979 (song performer)

== Bibliography ==
- Ray M. Lawless (1965) Folksingers and Folksongs in America, pages 112-3, ISBN 0-313-23104-4.
- Kristin Baggelaar and Donald Milton (1976) Folk Music: More Than A Song, pages 175-6, ISBN 0-690-01159-8.
- Dave Marsh and John Swenson (1979) The Rolling Stone Record Guide, 1st ed., page 171, ISBN 0-394-73535-8.
