= Jacqueline Steiner =

American folk singer, songwriter, and social activist (1924–2019)

Steiner c. 1990.

Jacqueline Steiner (September 11, 1924 – January 25, 2019) was an American folk singer, songwriter and social activist. Steiner is known for having written the lyrics to the song "M.T.A.", about a man stuck on the Boston subway because he could not pay the exit fare. "M.T.A." was co-written with Bess Lomax Hawes as part of a Boston political campaign in 1949 and later altered slightly by the popular folk group The Kingston Trio, becoming one of their hits in 1959.

== Life and career ==
Steiner was born in New York City and grew up in Greenwich Village. She was Jewish. She graduated from Vassar College and attended graduate courses at Radcliffe College, but left before earning her degree. During her time in Cambridge, Massachusetts, she began singing with other musicians who gathered at Bess Lomax Hawes' house, including Sam and Arnold Berman, brothers from Roxbury. A conversation between the Berman brothers inspired Hawes and Steiner to create "M.T.A."

Steiner married Arnold Berman and moved back to New York while he studied physics at Columbia University (they divorced in 1954). She was active in the folk scene in the 1950s and 60s, singing (as Jackie Berman) with Pete Seeger and others on Hootenanny Tonight! (recorded in 1954 and released by Folkways Records in 1959).

Following her divorce from Berman, Steiner married publisher Myron Sharpe. They honeymooned in the Soviet Union, where she performed in concert. Novelist Matthew Sharpe is their son; they also have a daughter, Susanna. She continued to work as an editor for Myron's publishing house even after their divorce.

As Jacqueline Sharpe, she released an album of antiwar songs in 1966 entitled No More War. Steiner was a linguist, as she demonstrated in 1991 with her album Far Afield: Songs of Three Continents.

Steiner joined the Norwalk, Connecticut branch of the African American civil rights advocacy group the National Association for the Advancement of Colored People (NAACP) in 1991, serving as the chapter's secretary for several years and receiving the Roy Wilkins Leadership Award for service from the state NAACP in 2010.

Steiner died of pneumonia on January 25, 2019 at the age of 94 in Norwalk, Connecticut, where she had been living since 1980.
