= Scotch and Soda (song) =

1958 song performed by The Kingston Trio

Single by The Kingston Trio

from the album The Kingston Trio
- Released: June 2, 1958
- Studio: Capitol Studios, Los Angeles, CA
- Genre: Folk
- Label: Capitol Records
- Songwriter: (Dave Guard)
- Producer: Voyle Gilmore

"Scotch and Soda" is a song recorded by The Kingston Trio in 1958 and first released on the album The Kingston Trio; it also appeared on the live album Once Upon a Time and on various compilations.

The Kingston Trio also released the song as a single in the United States in April 1962. It was also released in 1969 as the B-Side to the single "One Too Many Mornings".

== Composition ==
"Scotch and Soda" was discovered by the Trio through the parents of the baseball player Tom Seaver, who had first heard it in a hotel piano lounge in 1932 when on their honeymoon in Phoenix, Arizona. They liked it so much that they had the piano player write it down for them so it would be "their song." One member of the trio (Dave Guard) was dating Seaver's older sister (Katie) at that time and heard the song on a visit to the Seaver home. Although it is credited to Guard (he had it copyrighted in his name on March 30, 1959), the trio never discovered the real songwriter's name, though they searched for years.

== Cover Versions ==
Hank Thompson covered the song on his 2000 release, Seven Decades. The Manhattan Transfer covered the song on their 1976 album, Coming Out. Lou Rawls made a jazz version with a big band including a xylophone in 1963. The following is a partial list of others who have recorded this song.

- Henry Thome (1962)
- Johnnie Ray (March 1962)
- The Mercey Brothers (1968)
- Usha Iyer (1969)
- Jerry Inman (1976)
- The Brothers Four (1977)
- Fred Shelton (1978)
- Mac Wiseman (June 1979)
- Ray Price (1983)
- Torvill & Dean (August 1989)
- Suede (1992)
- Lowri Blake (1993)
- Cynthia Crane & Mike Renzi (1994)
- Lannie Garrett (October 15, 1996)
- Teresa Bright (1997)
- Amanda Carr (1997)
- Jennifer Trainor (1999)
- Hank Thompson (July 18, 2000)
- Wally Pleasant (2000)
- High Five (November 5, 2002)
- Kellye Gray (2002)
- Stuffy Shmitt (November 29, 2003)
- Giacomo Gates (June 2004)
- Carla Valenti (2004)
- Gale Mead (October 17, 2006)
- Mary Koth Lutton (2006)
- Steve Barton (September 7, 2009)
