= Bess Lomax Hawes =

American folk musician and folklorist (1921–2009)

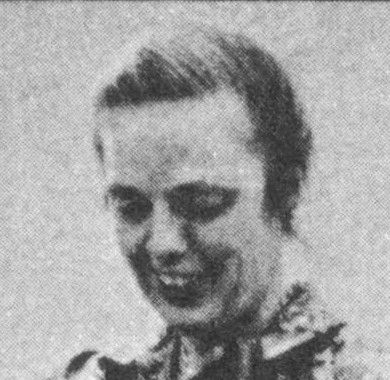
- in the 1960s

Background information
- Born: January 21, 1921; Austin, Texas, U.S.
- Died: November 27, 2009 (aged 88) Portland, Oregon, U.S.
- Genres: Folk-blues; gospel blues; songster; folk revival
- Instrument: Guitar
- Formerly of: Almanac Singers

Bess Lomax Hawes (January 21, 1921 – November 27, 2009) was an American folk musician, folklorist, and researcher. She was the daughter of John Avery Lomax and Bess Bauman-Brown Lomax, and the sister of Alan Lomax and John Lomax Jr.

== Early life and education ==
Born in Austin, Texas, Bess Lomax Hawes excelled at classical piano as a child under her mother's tutelage. Later, she learned to play the guitar. She learned folk music from a very early age since her father collected and published cowboy songs in the early 1900s. He was a former English professor, twice president of the American Folklore Society and was honorary curator of American folk songs at the Library of Congress from 1935 to 1948. He was a pioneering folklorist who, along with her brother, Alan, traveled the South for the Library of Congress, recording rural musicians who had not been influenced by the radio. Together, they collected thousands of American folk songs, focusing on and preserving oral traditions from marginalized groups and working-class people. His collections included cowboy ballads, African American spirituals, blues, work songs and field hollers.

At the Louisiana State Penitentiary at Angola during their first trip, they recorded Huddie Ledbetter (“Leadbelly”) who went on to become a successful and influential performer of traditional African-American music.

During the years that followed, her father and brother worked with many other folklorists, musicologists and composers from all over the world and recorded more than 10,000 examples of vocal and instrumental music.

They were responsible for introducing American audiences to other folk musicians and blues artists including Muddy Waters, Woody Guthrie, Josh White and Burl Ives.

Bess entered the University of Texas at fifteen and the following year assisted her father, her brother and modernist composer Ruth Crawford Seeger with their book, Our Singing Country (1941). She went on to graduate from Bryn Mawr College near Philadelphia with a degree in sociology. In 1970, she was among the first group of students to receive an M.A. in folklore at the University of California at Berkeley, under the guidance of professor Alan Dundes.

== Career in music and folk arts ==
In the early 1940s, she moved to New York City, where she was active in the folk music scene. She was an on-and-off member of the Almanac Singers, a group that specialized in topical songs, anti-war, anti-racism and pro-union songs. Woody Guthrie, another Almanac member, taught her mandolin and, in 1943, she married fellow Almanac singer, Baldwin "Butch" Hawes, who was also an artist. (Note: Butch who had the condition all his life, was the author of "Arthritis Blues", a staple in the repertoire of Ramblin' Jack Elliott which Elliot recorded on his 2006 album, I Stand Alone.)

During World War II, she worked for the Office of War Information preparing radio broadcasts for troops overseas. After the war ended, she and her family moved to Boston where she wrote songs for Walter A. O'Brien, the Progressive Party's candidate's 1949 mayoral campaign including "M.T.A.," which she co-wrote with Jacqueline Steiner. The song became a big hit for The Kingston Trio in 1959.

While her children (Nicholas Hawes, Corey Hawes Denos, and Naomi Hawes Bishop) were attending a cooperative nursery school organized by graduate students at MIT and Harvard:

She frequently brought her guitar to the school to perform for the students. Some of the parents, mostly the mothers, asked her to teach them how to play guitar, banjo and mandolin. Bess agreed to charge them one dollar each for each lesson, which lasted several hours, what she called "a whole evening." She would keep 50 cents for herself to pay for a babysitter and she'd donate the other 50 cents to the nursery school. Word soon spread, and others began to join her classes.

That was how Bess developed her technique for teaching guitar to large groups of people simultaneously, a method for which she became well-known and which accounts for the fact that over the years, especially after she moved to Los Angeles in 1951, she was able to teach many people to play guitar. Many of her students, in turn, became guitar teachers, spreading her method - and her enthusiasm for music - which helped catalyze the folk music revival of the 1950s and 1960s. Bess figured ... "students learning guitar individually can get intimidated because they can hear their own mistakes. In a group, the students feel bolder about playing, take more risks, enjoy it more, and feel part of something bigger, which sounds better, anyway." Peter Dreier, "Remembering Bess Lomax Hawes", Huffington Post, Nov. 30, 2009.

In the 1950s, she moved to California, where she taught guitar, banjo, mandolin and folk singing through UCLA Extension courses, at the Idyllwild summer arts program and, starting in 1963, at San Fernando Valley State College. She also played at local clubs as well as at some of the larger folk festivals such as the Newport Folk Festival and the Berkeley Folk Festival.

In 1968, she became associate professor of Anthropology at San Fernando Valley State College and later head of the Anthropology Department at what is now Cal State Northridge. In 1971, her husband, Butch, passed away.

In 1975, she accepted a position in administration at the Smithsonian Institution where she was instrumental in organizing the Smithsonian's 1976 Bicentennial Festival of American Folklife on the National Mall. In 1977, she was named first director of the Folk and Traditional Arts Program at the National Endowment for the Arts, and created the National Heritage Fellowships which recognize traditional artists and performers. During her tenure, funding for folk arts rose from about $100,000 to $4 million, and 50 state or territorial folk arts programs were set up:

"We're really honoring traditions," Mrs. Hawes told The Washington Post in 1983. "These individuals are the people who've been pushed up by the traditions. They're the lightning rods that we grab onto. It's extremely important for the psychic health and well-being of Americans to maintain all of these little regional distinctions, to establish a cultural pluralism. It's like my brother, folklorist Alan Lomax, wrote one time: 'If the cultural gray-out continues around the world, pretty soon there will be no place worth visiting ... and no particular reason to stay home, either.' " Patricia Sullivan, "Bess Lomax Hawes, 88, Championed folk arts as performer and NEA official".

She retired in 1992. In 1993, the University of North Carolina presented her with an honorary doctorate and, that same year, President Bill Clinton honored her with the National Medal of Arts. In 2000, the National Endowment for the Arts (NEA) established the Bess Lomax Hawes National Heritage Fellowship in her honor since she was the first director of the Folk & Traditional Arts Program. The award recognizes individuals who make major contributions to the excellence, vitality, and public appreciation of folk and traditional arts, particularly through teaching, advocacy, and organizing.

Her memoir, Sing It Pretty, was published by Illinois University Press in 2008.

== Legacy and Death ==
While a faculty member at California State University Northridge, she compiled an extensive archive of folk songs that were gathered by her students in Los Angeles and abroad. The archive is held in the Special Collections and Archives section of CSUN's University Library.

She died on November 27, 2009 in Portland, Oregon at the age of 88, following a stroke.

== Bibliography ==
- Hawes, Bess Lomax. Step it Down: Games, Plays, Songs, and Stories from the Afro-American Heritage. University of Georgia Press, 1987.
- Hawes, Bess Lomax, Alan Lomax and J.D. Elder. There's a Brown Girl in the Ring, Random House, New York, 1997 (Cloth, ISBN 0-679-40453-8). Children's games from the Caribbean.
- Hawes, Bess Lomax. Sing It Pretty: A Memoir (Music in American Life). University of Illinois Press. 2008.

== Filmography ==
- The Films of Bess Lomax Hawes Four films made at San Fernando Valley State (1964–1970) (afterwards California State University Northridge): Georgia Sea Island Singers, Buckdancer, Pizza Pizza Daddy-O, and Say Old Man Can You Play the Fiddle.
