= Bob Shane =

American musician (1934–2020)

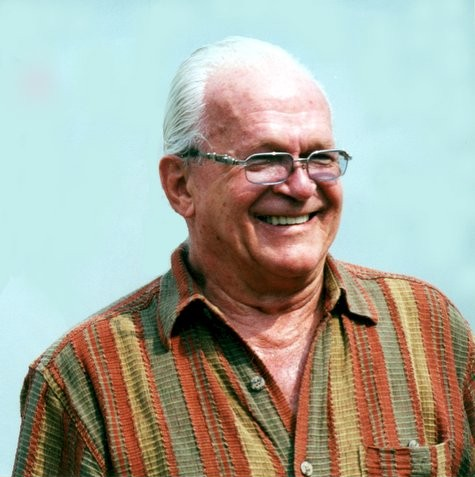
- Shane in 2004

Background information
- Born: Robert Castle Schoen; February 1, 1934; Hilo, Territory of Hawaii, U.S.
- Died: January 26, 2020 (aged 85) Phoenix, Arizona, U.S.
- Genres: Folk, pop
- Occupations: Singer; guitarist
- Instruments: Vocals; guitar; banjo
- Years active: 1957–2004
- Labels: Capitol; Decca
- Formerly of: The Kingston Trio

Robert Castle Schoen (February 1, 1934 – January 26, 2020), known professionally as Bob Shane, was an American singer and guitarist who was a founding member of The Kingston Trio. In that capacity, Shane became a seminal figure in the revival of folk and other acoustic music as a popular art form in the United States in the late 1950s through the mid-1960s.

The success of the Kingston Trio in its heyday had repercussions far beyond its voluminous album sales (including four albums simultaneously in the Top 10 in 1959), its host of imitators, and the relatively short-lived pop-folk boom it created. For the Kingston Trio's success took acoustic folk-based music out of the niche market it had occupied prior to the Trio's arrival and moved it into the mainstream of American popular music, opening the door for major record labels to record and market both more traditional folk musicians and singer-songwriters.

== Early life ==
Shane was born on February 1, 1934, in Hilo on the Big Island of Hawaii, the son of Margaret (Schaufelberger) and Arthur Castle Schoen, a wholesale distributor of toys and sporting goods. His mother was from Salt Lake City, and his father was a Hawaiian of German descent. Shane was in his own words "a fourth-generation islander". He attended local schools, including the prestigious Punahou School for his junior high and high school years. Punahou's curriculum emphasized native Hawaiian culture, complementing Shane's already developing interest in music in general and Hawaiian music in particular.

During these years, Shane (the phonetic spelling he began using in 1957) taught himself to play first ukulele and then guitar, influenced especially by Hawaiian slack key guitarists like Gabby Pahinui. It was also during these years that Shane met Punahou classmate Dave Guard and began performing with him at parties and school variety shows.

== Formation of The Kingston Trio ==
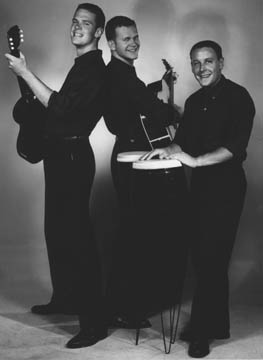
The Kingston Trio's original lineup: Dave Guard, Bob Shane, Nick Reynolds

Following graduation in 1952, Shane attended Menlo College in Menlo Park, California, while Guard matriculated at nearby Stanford University. At Menlo, Shane met and became fast friends with Nick Reynolds, originally from the San Diego area and also a musician and singer with a broad knowledge of folk and popular songs, due in part to Reynolds's music-loving father, a captain in the Navy. Shane introduced Reynolds to Guard, and in 1956, the three began performing together as part of an informal aggregation that could, according to Reynolds, expand to as large as six or seven members. The group went under different names, most often as "Dave Guard and the Calypsonians". They made little more than beer money and had no formal professional aspirations. Shane dropped out of college in his senior year and returned to Hawaii to work in the family business.

However, Shane had discovered a natural affinity for entertaining and at night pursued a solo career in Hawaii, including engagements at some of Waikiki's major hotels. Shane's act consisted of an eclectic mix of songs from Elvis Presley, Hank Williams, Harry Belafonte, and Broadway shows. During this period of several months he also met acoustic blues legend Josh White, who helped Shane refine his guitar style and influenced him to support his vocals with a Martin "Dreadnought" guitar, significant in that it led to Shane's lifelong association with that guitar maker. The company reciprocated by issuing a number of "signature" models honoring Shane and the Kingston Trio in the late 1990s and early 2000s.

At the same time back in California, Guard and Reynolds had organized themselves somewhat more formally into an act named "The Kingston Quartet" with bassist Joe Gannon and his fiancée, vocalist Barbara Bogue. This group appeared for a one-night engagement at a restaurant called the Italian Village in San Francisco, to which they invited publicist Frank Werber, who had caught the Calypsonians' act with Shane some months earlier at the Cracked Pot beer garden in Palo Alto. Werber was impressed by the natural talent of and synergy between Guard and Reynolds; he was less impressed with Gannon and Bogue and suggested to Reynolds and Guard that they would be better off as a trio without Gannon - easier to book and better musically. When Guard and Reynolds let Gannon go and Bogue followed, Reynolds, Guard and Werber all considered Shane the logical third member and asked him to return to California, which he did in spring 1957. Shane's baritone vocals and guitar work were the foundation of the Kingston Trio's sound.

Shane, Guard, Reynolds, and Werber drew up an informal agreement (on a paper napkin, according to a legend that Werber has debunked) that morphed into a legal partnership. They decided on the name "Kingston Trio" because it evoked, they thought, both the then-popular calypso music that emanated from Kingston, Jamaica as well as the kind of "collegiate" ambiance suggested by their quickly adopted stage outfit of matching button-down collared three-quarter length sleeved striped shirts.

== The Kingston Trio: The Peak Years, 1957–1967 ==
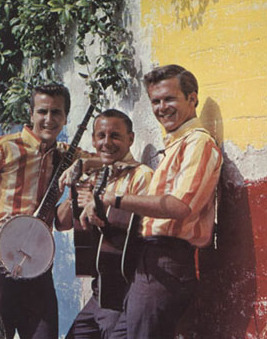
The Kingston Trio's second troupe: John Stewart, Nick Reynolds, Bob Shane

Under Werber's rigorous tutelage, Shane, Guard, and Reynolds began almost daily rehearsals for several months, including instruction from prominent San Francisco vocal coach Judy Davis. The group's first significant break came in the summer of 1957 when comedian Phyllis Diller had to cancel an engagement at The Purple Onion, a small San Francisco night club, and Werber talked the management into hiring the untested trio for a week. The trio's close harmonies, varied repertoire, and carefully rehearsed but apparently spontaneous on stage humor made them an instant success with the club's patrons, and the engagement stretched to six months.

During this stint, Werber used the Kingston Trio's local popularity to try to generate interest from record companies. After several false starts, the group landed a contract with Capitol Records, recording their first album in three days in February 1958. The producer was the already legendary Voyle Gilmore, who made two immediate and fateful decisions. Gilmore insisted that the trio's acoustic sound have more of a "bottom" and added a bass player to the recordings. He also decided that the group should be recorded without additional orchestral instrumentation, unusual for the time; both decisions came to characterize nearly all of the Kingston Trio's subsequent recordings and live performances.

The album The Kingston Trio was released in June 1958 at the same time that the group was beginning a long engagement at San Francisco's more prominent Hungry i night club. The album included the number that became Shane's signature song, "Scotch and Soda," powerful and rhythmic guitar work from Shane throughout, and an obscure North Carolina murder ballad, "Tom Dooley" on which Shane sang the lead.

In the summer of 1958, while Shane and the Trio were performing at the Royal Hawaiian Hotel in Honolulu, disc jockey Paul Colburn in Salt Lake City began playing the "Tom Dooley" cut from the album on the air, and DJs in Miami and nationally followed suit. Popular response forced a reluctant Capitol Records marketing department to release the song as a single on August 8, 1958. It shot to #1 on the Billboard and Variety charts, selling a million copies before Christmas of 1958 and earning the Kingston Trio both its first of eight gold records and of two Grammys.

This ushered in an era of remarkable success as both a recording and performing act for Shane and the Trio. In 1959 alone, the group released four albums, three of which attained #1 status and all four of which were in Billboard's Top Ten in December 1959, a feat equaled only by the Beatles. Thirteen of their albums placed in Billboard's Top Ten, with five going to #1 and the first album remaining on the charts for 195 weeks. A half dozen singles charted in the Top 100 as well. The group played over two hundred dates per year for several years, pioneering the college concert circuit and appearing at most of the country's top night clubs, festivals, and amphitheaters as well.

It was during this period, however, that conflict began to simmer between high school friends Shane and Guard. Disputes over the musical direction of the Kingston Trio and disagreement over finances and copyrights are the causes most frequently cited in Guard's decision in the spring of 1961 to leave what was at the time the most popular group in American music. Shane, Reynolds, and Werber bought out Guard's interest in the partnership and moved quickly to find a replacement, settling on John Stewart, a young folk performer and composer who had written a number of songs that the Trio had already recorded. The Shane, Reynolds, and Stewart Kingston Trio remained together for another six years, releasing nine more albums on Capitol and scoring a number of Top 40 hit singles until diminishing record sales resulting from the passing of the popular folk boom and the rise of Capitol's other major acts the Beach Boys and the Beatles prompted the group to move to Decca Records. They released four more albums before disbanding as an act following a final engagement at the Hungry i in June 1967.

== Solo efforts and The New Kingston Trio, 1969–1976 ==
Shane had not been in favor of the break-up of the Kingston Trio, both because he felt that the Trio could adapt to changing musical tastes and because he had by then become a thoroughly accomplished entertainer and a canny marketer. Deciding to stay in the entertainment business, Shane experimented both with solo work (he recorded several singles, including the original version of the song "Honey" that later became a million-seller for Bobby Goldsboro) and with different configurations with other folk-oriented performers.

In 1969, he asked permission of Reynolds and Werber, still his partners, to lease the group's name. They assented with the provisos that Shane assemble a group of comparable musical quality to the two original configurations and that "New" be appended to the name. Shane organized two troupes under the name of "The New Kingston Trio". The first consisted of guitarist Pat Horine and banjoist Jim Connor in addition to Shane and lasted from 1969 to 1973, the second including guitarist Roger Gambill and banjoist Bill Zorn from 1973 until 1976. Shane tried to create a repertoire for these groups that included both expected Kingston Trio standards like "Tom Dooley" and "M.T.A." but also more contemporary songs, including country and novelty tunes. The attempt did not meet with any significant success. Though both of these groups made a limited number of recordings and television appearances, neither generated very much interest from fans or the public at large.

== Another Kingston Trio, reunion, and retirement: 1976–2004 ==
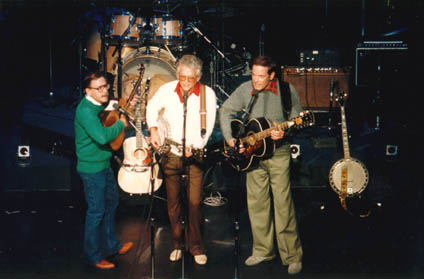
The 1981 Reunion Concert: Nick Reynolds, Bob Shane, Dave Guard

At the end of 1976, Bill Zorn wanted to pursue a solo career and left the group under amicable circumstances. To replace him, Shane found a younger performer named George Grove, an instrumentalist and singer. Shane realized that the group's greatest asset in addition to his vocals and his presence as a founding member was the name itself. Consequently, he purchased the rights to the Kingston Trio name outright from Reynolds and Werber, and all subsequent iterations of Shane's troupe since late 1976 have been known simply as the Kingston Trio.

In 1981, PBS producers JoAnn Young and Paul Surratt pitched an idea to Shane: a reunion concert that the network could use as a fund raiser and that would include not only Shane's current group but also on stage reunions of the two original Kingston Trio lineups with Guard and Stewart. Shane and the other principals assented, and the concert was staged and taped at the Magic Mountain amusement park in Valencia, California in November 1981; it was broadcast over PBS stations in March 1982.

Despite some residual tension between Guard and Shane, part of which surfaced in a Wall Street Journal article by Roy Harris about the event and which resulted from public comments made by Guard that Shane felt disparaged both him and his current group, the concert was moderately successful and became a landmark in Kingston Trio history. Over the next nine years, Shane and Guard reconciled to a large degree. Guard was suffering from cancer though apparently in remission when Shane and Reynolds visited him in New Hampshire in the summer of 1990, and the three discussed the possibility of a reunion tour that would again feature Shane's current troupe (which by this time included a re-invigorated Nick Reynolds) as well as Guard and Stewart. Guard's lymphoma returned, however, and he died in March 1991. Shane was the only member of any configuration of the Kingston Trio to sing at Guard's memorial service.

Through the years following Shane's acquisition of the Kingston Trio name in 1976, the personnel in the group changed several times, though Shane and Grove remained constants. Shane guided the group to a success that, if never the equivalent of the group's first decade, was nonetheless steady and consistent. Shane's Kingston Trio relied heavily on a "greatest hits formula" augmented by a number of other songs acquired through the years that fans had accepted as part of the group's repertoire.

In March 2004, a month after his 70th birthday, Shane suffered a debilitating heart attack that forced him into retirement from touring and performing after 47 years with the act. Though Shane had initially planned to return to the group after convalescing, the attack was severe enough to warrant Shane's permanent withdrawal from performing with the group that he still owned. He was replaced by former New Kingston Trio member Bill Zorn.

== Personal life ==
Shane was married for 23 years to the former Louise Brandon; they had 5 children and 8 grandchildren. The marriage ended in divorce and he remarried in 2000 to Bobbi Childress.

He died on January 26, 2020, at a hospice facility in Phoenix, Arizona. He was six days short of his 86th birthday.
