= Werber =

Werber is a surname. Notable people and characters with the name include:

- Baruch Werber (1810–1876), Galician Jewish Hebraist, author, publisher, and editor
- Bernard Werber (born 1961), French science fiction writer
- Billy Werber (1908–2009), American baseball player
- Frank Werber (1929–2007), German-born American talent manager, restaurant owner and entrepreneur
- Heitz Werber, fictional character in The X-Files
- Jacob Werber (1859–1890), Galician Jewish editor and writer
- Jeff Werber, American veterinarian and veterinary medical journalist

== See also ==
- 381048 Werber, asteroid named for Bernard Werber
