= American folk music revival =

20th-century American musical movement

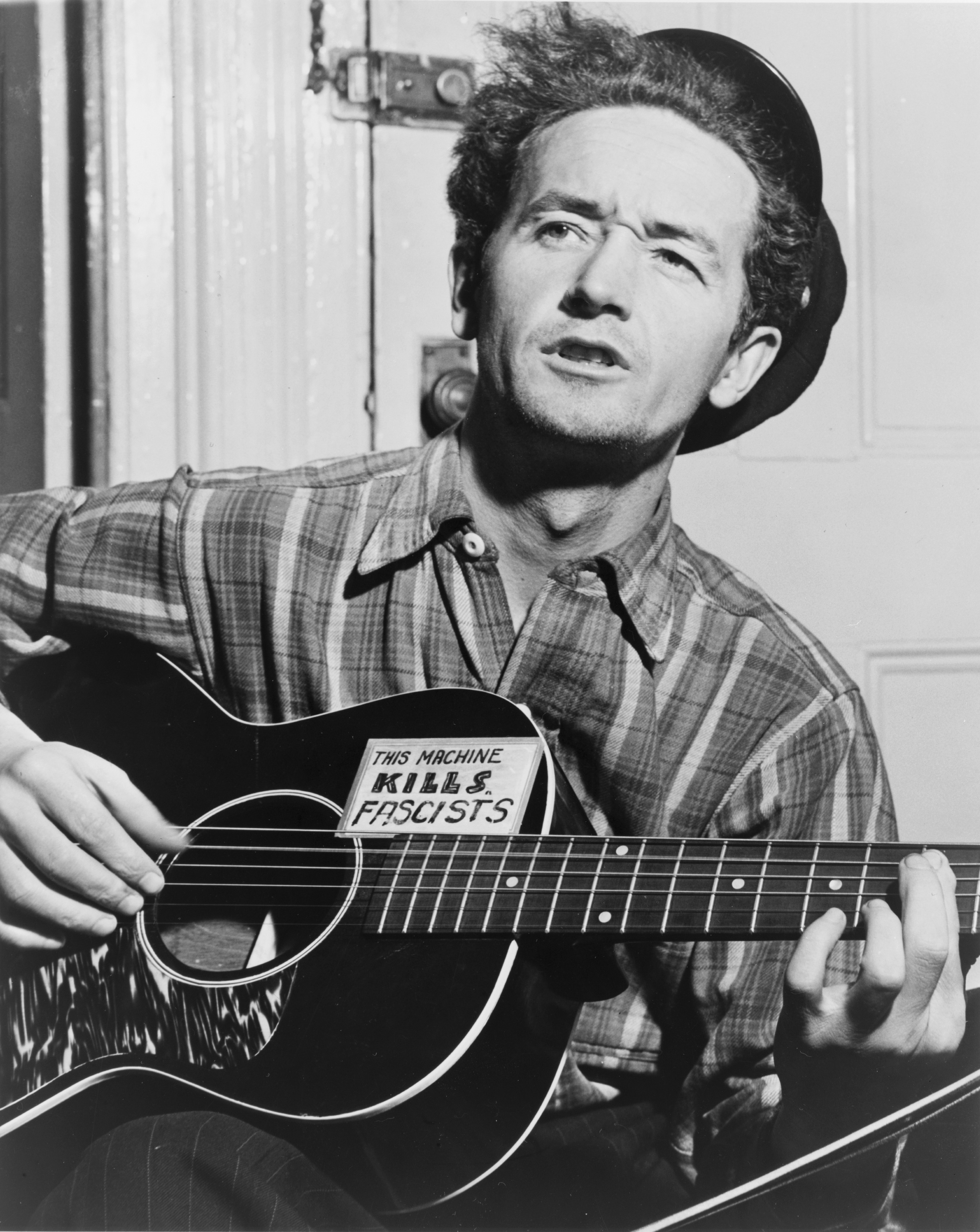
Singer-songwriter Woody Guthrie emerged from the dust bowl of Oklahoma and the Great Depression in the mid-20th century, with lyrics that embraced his views on ecology, poverty, and unionization, paired with melody reflecting the many genres of American folk music.

The American folk music revival began during the 1940s and peaked in popularity in the mid-1960s. Early folk music performers include Woody Guthrie, Lead Belly, Pete Seeger, Richard Dyer-Bennet, Oscar Brand, Jean Ritchie, John Jacob Niles, Susan Reed, Mississippi John Hurt, Josh White, and Cisco Houston. Lead Belly recorded "Cotton Fields" and "Goodnight, Irene" and folk singer Odetta released folk albums.

New folk musicians such as Bob Dylan, Joan Baez, Judy Collins, Joni Mitchell, Phil Ochs, Peter Paul & Mary and many others recorded folk songs and new compositions in the folk style in the 1960s and 1970s. The revival also brought forward strains of American folk music that had in earlier times contributed to the development of country and western, bluegrass, blues, and rock and roll music.

== Overview ==
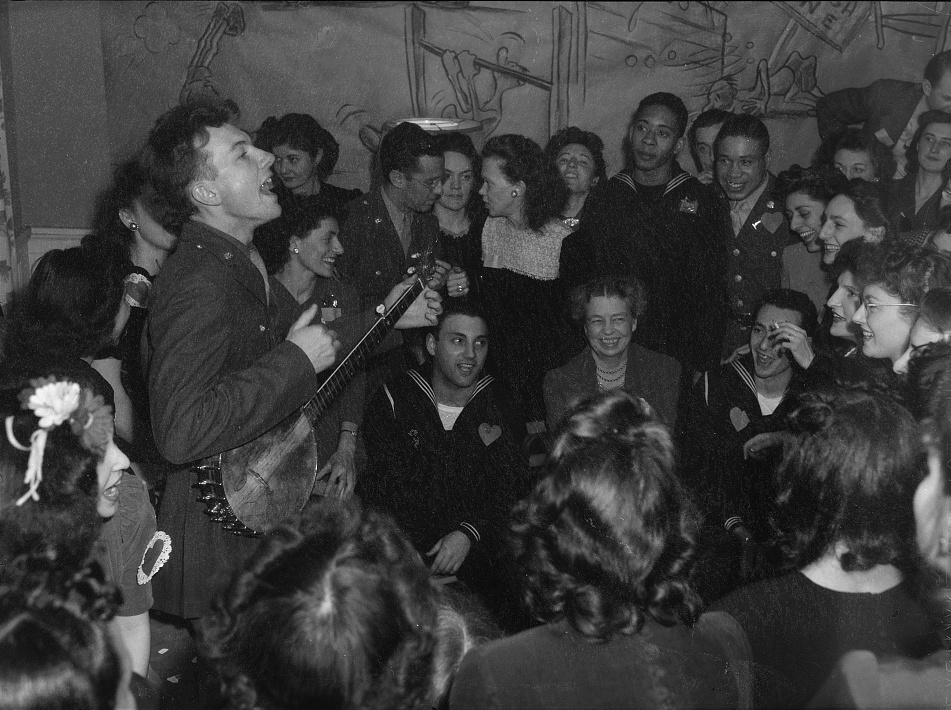
Pete Seeger entertaining Eleanor Roosevelt, honored guest at a racially integrated Valentine's Day party marking the opening of a canteen for the United Federal Workers of America, a trade union representing federal employees, in then-segregated Washington, D.C. Photographed by Joseph Horne for the Office of War Information, 1944.

=== Early years ===
The folk revival in New York City was rooted in the resurgent interest in square dancing and folk dancing there in the 1940s as espoused by instructors such as Margot Mayo, which gave musicians such as Pete Seeger popular exposure. The folk revival more generally as a popular and commercial phenomenon begins with the career of the Weavers, formed in November 1948 by Pete Seeger, Lee Hays, Fred Hellerman, and Ronnie Gilbert of People's Songs, of which Seeger had been president and Hays executive secretary.

People's Songs, which disbanded in 1948–49, had been a clearing house for labor movement songs (and in particular the CIO, which at the time was one of the few if not the only union federation that was racially integrated), and in 1948 had thrown all its resources to the failed presidential campaign of Progressive Party candidate Henry Wallace, a folk-music aficionado (his running mate was a country-music singer-guitarist). Hays and Seeger had formerly sung together as the politically activist Almanac Singers, a group which they founded in 1941 and whose personnel often included Woody Guthrie, Josh White, Lead Belly, Cisco Houston, and Bess Lomax Hawes.

The Weavers had a big hit in 1950 with the single of Lead Belly's "Goodnight, Irene". This was number one on the Billboard charts for thirteen weeks. On its flip side was "Tzena, Tzena, Tzena", an Israeli dance song that concurrently reached number two on the charts. This was followed by a string of Weaver hit singles that sold millions, including "So Long It's Been Good to Know You" ("Dusty Old Dust") (by Woody Guthrie) and "Kisses Sweeter Than Wine".

The Weavers' career ended abruptly when they were dropped from Decca's catalog because Pete Seeger had been listed in the publication Red Channels as a probable subversive. Radio stations refused to play their records and concert venues canceled their engagements. A former employee of People's Songs, Harvey Matusow, himself a former Communist Party member, had informed the FBI that the Weavers were Communists, too, although Matusow later recanted and admitted he had lied.

Pete Seeger and Lee Hays were called to testify before the House Un-American Activities Committee in 1955. Despite this, a Christmas Weaver reunion concert organized by Harold Leventhal in 1955 was a smash success and the Vanguard LP album of that concert, issued in 1957, was one of the top sellers of that year, followed by other successful albums.

Folk music, which often carried the stigma of left-wing associations during the 1950s Red Scare, was driven underground and carried along by a handful of artists releasing records. Barred from mainstream outlets, artists like Seeger were restricted to performing in schools and summer camps, and the folk-music scene became a phenomenon associated with vaguely rebellious bohemianism in places like New York (especially Greenwich Village) and San Francisco's North Beach, and in the college and university districts of cities like Chicago, Greater Boston (especially Cambridge, Massachusetts), Denver, Minneapolis and elsewhere.

Ron Eyerman and Scott Baretta speculate that:

[I]t is interesting to consider that had it not been for the explicit political sympathies of the Weavers and other folk singers or, another way of looking at it, the hysterical anti-communism of the Cold War, folk music would very likely have entered mainstream American culture in even greater force in the early 1950s, perhaps making the second wave of the revival nearly a decade later [i.e., in the 1960s] redundant.

The media blackout of performers with alleged communist sympathies or ties was so effective that Israel Young, a chronicler of the 1960s Folk Revival who was drawn into the movement through an interest in folk dancing, communicated to Ron Eyerman that he himself was unaware for many years of the movement's 1930s and early '40s antecedents in left-wing political activism.

In the early and mid-1950s, acoustic-guitar-accompanied folk songs were mostly heard in coffee houses, private parties, open-air concerts, and sing-alongs, hootenannies, and at college-campus concerts. Often associated with political dissent, folk music now blended, to some degree, with the so-called beatnik scene, and dedicated singers of folk songs (as well as folk-influenced original material) traveled through what was called "the coffee-house circuit" across the U.S. and Canada, home also to cool jazz and recitations of highly personal beatnik poetry. Two singers of the 1950s who sang folk material but crossed over into the mainstream were Odetta and Harry Belafonte, both of whom sang Lead Belly and Josh White material. Odetta, who had trained as an opera singer, performed traditional blues, spirituals, and songs by Lead Belly. Belafonte had hits with Jamaican calypso material as well as the folk song-like sentimental ballad "Scarlet Ribbons" (composed in 1949).

=== The revival at its height ===
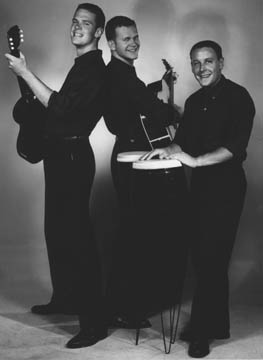
The Kingston Trio in 1958

The Kingston Trio, a group originating on the West Coast, were directly inspired by the Weavers in their style and presentation and covered some of the Weavers' material, which was predominantly traditional. The Kingston Trio avoided overtly political or protest songs and cultivated a clean-cut collegiate persona. They were discovered while playing at a college club called the Cracked Pot by Frank Werber, who became their manager and secured them a deal with Capitol Records.

Their first hit was a rewritten rendition of an old-time folk murder ballad, "Tom Dooley", which had been sung at Lead Belly's funeral concert. This went gold in 1958 and sold more than three million copies. The success of the album and the single earned the Kingston Trio a Grammy award for Best Country & Western Performance at the awards' inaugural ceremony in 1959. At the time, no folk-music category existed in the Grammy's scheme.

The next year, largely as a result of The Kingston Trio album and "Tom Dooley", the National Academy of Recording Arts and Sciences instituted a folk category and the Trio won the first Grammy Award for Best Ethnic or Traditional Folk Recording for its second studio album At Large. At one point, The Kingston Trio had four records at the same time among the top 10 selling albums for five consecutive weeks in November and December 1959 according to Billboard magazine's "Top LPs" chart, a record unmatched for more than 50 years and noted at the time by a cover story in Life magazine.

The huge commercial success of the Kingston Trio, whose recordings between 1958 and 1961 earned more than $25 million for Capitol records (equivalent to $269 million in 2025) spawned a host of groups that were similar in some respects like the Brothers Four, Peter, Paul and Mary, the Limeliters, the Chad Mitchell Trio, the New Christy Minstrels, the Highwaymen, and more. As noted by critic Bruce Eder in the All Music Guide, the popularity of the commercialized version of folk music represented by these groups emboldened record companies to sign, record, and promote artists with more traditionalist and political sensibilities.

The Kingston Trio's popularity would be followed by that of Joan Baez, whose debut album Joan Baez reached the top ten in late 1960 and remained on the Billboard charts for over two years. Baez's early albums contained mostly traditional material, such as the Scottish ballad "Mary Hamilton", as well as many covers of melancholy tunes that had appeared in Harry Smith's Anthology of American Folk Music, such as "The Wagoner's Lad" and "The Butcher Boy". She did not try to imitate the singing style of her source material, however, but used a rich soprano with vibrato. Her popularity (and that of the folk revival itself) would place Baez on the cover of Time magazine in November 1962.

Unlike the Kingston Trio, Baez was openly political, and as the civil rights movement gathered steam, she aligned herself with Pete Seeger, Guthrie and others. Baez was one of the singers with Seeger, Josh White, Peter, Paul and Mary, and Bob Dylan who appeared at Martin Luther King's 1963 March on Washington and sang "We Shall Overcome", a song that had been introduced by People's Songs. Harry Belafonte was one of the principal organizers of the march and was also present on that occasion, as was Odetta, whom Martin Luther King introduced as "the queen of folk music" when she sang "Oh, Freedom". (Odetta Sings Folk Songs was one of 1963's best-selling folk albums). Also on hand were the SNCC Freedom Singers, the personnel of which went on to form Sweet Honey in the Rock.

The critical role played by Freedom Songs in the voter registration drives, freedom rides, and lunch counter sit-ins during the Civil Rights Movement of the late 1950s and early '60s in the South gave folk music tremendous new visibility and prestige. The peace movement was likewise energized by the rise of the Campaign for Nuclear Disarmament in the UK, protesting the British testing of the H-bomb in 1958, as well as by the ever-proliferating arms race and the increasingly unpopular Vietnam War.

Young singer-songwriter Bob Dylan, playing acoustic guitar and harmonica, had been signed and recorded for Columbia by producer John Hammond in 1961. Dylan's record enjoyed some popularity among Greenwich Village folk-music enthusiasts, but he was "discovered" by an immensely larger audience when Peter, Paul & Mary had a hit with a cover of his song "Blowin' in the Wind". That trio also brought Pete Seeger's and the Weavers' "If I Had a Hammer" to nationwide audiences, as well as covering songs by other artists such as Oscar Brand and John Denver.

It was not long before the folk-music category came to include less traditional material and more personal and poetic creations by individual performers, who called themselves "singer-songwriters". As a result of the financial success of high-profile commercial folk artists, record companies began to produce and distribute records by a new generation of folk revival and singer-songwriters—Phil Ochs, Tom Paxton, Eric von Schmidt, Buffy Sainte-Marie, Dave Van Ronk, Judy Collins, Tom Rush, Fred Neil, Gordon Lightfoot, Billy Ed Wheeler, John Denver, John Stewart, Arlo Guthrie, Harry Chapin, and John Hartford, among others.

These singers frequently prided themselves on performing traditional material in imitations of the style of the source singers whom they had discovered, frequently by listening to Harry Smith's celebrated LP compilation of forgotten or obscure commercial 78 rpm "race" and "hillbilly" recordings of the 1920s and 30s, the Folkways Anthology of American Folk Music (1951). A number of the artists who had made these old recordings were still very much alive and had been "rediscovered" and brought to the 1963 and 64 Newport Folk Festivals. For example, traditionalist Clarence Ashley introduced folk revivalists to the music of friends of his who still actively played the older music, such as Doc Watson and The Stanley Brothers.

=== Archivists, collectors, and re-issued recordings ===
During the 1950s, the growing folk-music crowd that had developed in the United States began to buy records by older, traditional musicians from the Southeastern hill country and from urban inner-cities. New LP compilations of commercial 78 rpm race and hillbilly studio recordings stretching back to the 1920s and 1930s were published by major record labels. The expanding market in LP records increased the availability of folk-music field recordings originally made by John and Alan Lomax, Kenneth S. Goldstein, and other collectors during the New Deal era of the 1930s and 40s.

Small record labels, such as Yazoo Records, grew up to distribute reissued older recordings and to make new recordings of the survivors among these artists. This was how many urban white American audiences of the 1950s and 60s first heard country blues and especially Delta blues that had been recorded by Mississippi folk artists 30 or 40 years before.

In 1952, Folkways Records released the Anthology of American Folk Music, compiled by anthropologist and experimental film maker Harry Smith. The Anthology featured 84 songs by traditional country and blues artists, initially recorded between 1927 and 1932, and was credited with making a large amount of pre-War material accessible to younger musicians. (The Anthology was re-released on CD in 1997, and Smith was belatedly presented with a Grammy Award for his achievement in 1991.)

Artists like the Carter Family, Robert Johnson, Blind Lemon Jefferson, Clarence Ashley, Buell Kazee, Uncle Dave Macon, Mississippi John Hurt, and the Stanley Brothers, as well as Jimmie Rodgers, the Reverend Gary Davis, and Bill Monroe came to have something more than a regional or ethnic reputation. The revival turned up a tremendous wealth and diversity of music and put it out through radio shows and record stores.

Living representatives of some of the varied regional and ethnic traditions, including younger performers like Southern-traditional singer Jean Ritchie, who had first begun recording in the 1940s, also enjoyed a resurgence of popularity through enthusiasts' widening discovery of this music and appeared regularly at folk festivals.

=== Ethnic folk music ===
Ethnic folk music from other countries also had a boom during the American folk revival. The most successful ethnic performers of the revival were the Greenwich Village folksingers, the Clancy Brothers and Tommy Makem, whom Billboard magazine listed as the eleventh best-selling folk musicians in the United States. The group, which consisted of Paddy Clancy, Tom Clancy, Liam Clancy, and Tommy Makem, predominantly sang English-language Irish folk songs, as well as an occasional song in Irish Gaelic.

Paddy Clancy also started and ran the folk-music label Tradition Records, which produced Odetta's first solo LP and initially brought Carolyn Hester to national prominence. Pete Seeger played the banjo on their Grammy-nominated 1961 album, A Spontaneous Performance Recording, and Bob Dylan later cited the group as a major influence on him. The Clancy Brothers and Tommy Makem also sparked a folk-music boom in Ireland in the mid-1960s, illustrating the world-wide effects of the American folk-music revival.

Books such as the popular best seller the Fireside Book of Folk Songs (1947), which contributed to the folk song revival, featured some material in languages other than English, including German, Spanish, Italian, French, Yiddish, and Russian. The repertoires of Theodore Bikel, Marais and Miranda, and Martha Schlamme also included Hebrew and Jewish material, as well as Afrikaans. The Weavers' first big hit, the flipside of Lead Belly's "Good Night Irene" and a top seller in its own right, was in Hebrew ("Tzena, Tzena, Tzena") and they and later Joan Baez, who was of Mexican descent, occasionally included Spanish-language material in their repertoires, as well as songs from Africa, India, and elsewhere.

The commercially oriented folk-music revival as it existed in coffee houses, concert halls, radio, and TV was predominantly an English-language phenomenon, though many of the major pop-folk groups, such as the Kingston Trio, Peter, Paul and Mary, The Chad Mitchell Trio, The Limeliters, The Brothers Four, The Highwaymen, and others, featured songs in Spanish (often from Mexico), Polynesian languages, Russian, French, and other languages in their recordings and performances. These groups also sang many English-language songs of foreign origin.

=== Rock subsumes folk ===
The British Invasion of the mid-1960s helped bring an end to the mainstream popularity of American folk music as a wave of British bands overwhelmed most of the American music scene, including folk. Folk was disproportionately harmed by the Invasion; while other acts and categories were at least temporary harmed by the Invasion, folk revival acts suffered the most severe and permanent damage to their careers most directly because of it, without the confounding factors other victims faced. Ironically, the roots of the British Invasion were in American folk, specifically a variant known as skiffle as popularized by Lonnie Donegan; however, most of the British Invasion bands had been extensively influenced by rock and roll by the time their music had reached the United States and bore little resemblance to its folk origins.

After Bob Dylan began to record with a rocking rhythm section and electric instruments in 1965 (see Electric Dylan controversy), many other still-young folk artists followed suit. Meanwhile, bands like The Lovin' Spoonful and the Byrds, whose individual members often had a background in the folk-revival coffee-house scene, were getting recording contracts with folk-tinged music played with a rock-band line-up. Before long, the public appetite for the more acoustic music of the folk revival began to wane.

"Crossover" hits ("folk songs" that became rock-music-scene staples) happened now and again. One well-known example is the song "Hey Joe", copyrighted by folk artist Billy Roberts and recorded by rock singer/guitarist Jimi Hendrix just as he was about to burst into stardom in 1967. The anthem "Woodstock", which was written and first sung by Joni Mitchell while her records were still nearly entirely acoustic and while she was labeled a "folk singer", became a hit single for Crosby, Stills, Nash & Young when the group recorded a full-on rock version.

=== Legacy ===
By the late 1960s, the scene had returned to being more of a lower-key, aficionado phenomenon, although sizable annual acoustic-music festivals were established in many parts of North America during this period. The acoustic music coffee-house scene survived at a reduced scale. Through the luminary young singer-songwriters of the 1960s, the American folk-music revival has influenced songwriting and musical styles throughout the world.

== Major figures ==
- Woody Guthrie is best known as an American singer-songwriter and folk musician whose musical legacy includes hundreds of political, traditional and children's songs, ballads and improvised works. He frequently performed with the slogan This Machine Kills Fascists displayed on his guitar. His best-known song is "This Land Is Your Land". Many of his recorded songs are archived in the Library of Congress. In the 1930s Guthrie traveled with migrant workers from Oklahoma to California while learning, rewriting, and performing traditional folk and blues songs along the way. Many of the songs he composed were about his experiences in the Dust Bowl era during the Great Depression, earning him the nickname the "Dust Bowl Balladeer". Throughout his life, Guthrie was associated with United States communist groups, though he never formally joined the Party. During his later years Guthrie served as a prominent leader in the folk movement, providing inspiration to a generation of new folk musicians, including mentor relationships with Ramblin' Jack Elliott and Bob Dylan. Such songwriters as Dylan, Phil Ochs, Bruce Springsteen, Pete Seeger, Joe Strummer and Tom Paxton have acknowledged their debt to Guthrie as an influence. Guthrie's son Arlo broke into the folk scene near the end of Woody's life and had significant success of his own.
- The Almanac Singers Almanac members Millard Lampell, Lee Hays, Pete Seeger, and Woody Guthrie began playing together informally in 1940; the Almanac Singers were formed in December 1940. They invented a driving, energetic performing style, based on what they felt was the best of American country string band music, black and white. They evolved towards controversial topical music. Two of the regular members of the group, Pete Seeger and Lee Hays, later became founding members of The Weavers.
- Burl Ives – as a youth, Ives dropped out of college to travel around as an itinerant singer during the early 1930s, earning his way by doing odd jobs and playing his guitar and banjo. In 1930 he had a brief local radio career on WBOW radio in Terre Haute, Indiana, and in the 1940s he had his own radio show The Wayfaring Stranger, titled after one of the ballads he sang. The show was very popular, and in 1946 Ives was cast as a singing cowboy in the film Smoky. Ives went on to play parts in other popular films as well. His first book, also titled The Wayfaring Stranger, was published in 1948.
- Pete Seeger had met and been influenced by many important folk musicians and singer-songwriters with folk roots such as Woody Guthrie and Lead Belly. Seeger had labor movement involvements, and he met Guthrie at a "Grapes of Wrath" migrant workers' concert on March 3, 1940, and the two thereafter began a musical collaboration that included the Almanac Singers. In 1948 Seeger wrote the first version of his now-classic How to Play the Five-String Banjo, an instructional book that many banjo players credit with starting them off on the instrument.
- The Weavers were formed in 1947 by Seeger, Ronnie Gilbert, Lee Hays, and Fred Hellerman. After they debuted at the Village Vanguard in New York in 1948, they were then discovered by arranger Gordon Jenkins and signed with Decca Records, releasing a series of successful but heavily orchestrated single songs. The group's political associations in the era of the Red Scare forced them to break up in 1952; they re-formed in 1955 with a series of successful concerts and album recordings on Vanguard Records. A fifth member, Erik Darling, sometimes sat in with the group when Seeger was unavailable and ultimately replaced Seeger in The Weavers when the latter resigned from the quartet in a dispute about its commercialism in general and its specific agreement to record a cigarette commercial.
- Josh White was an authentic singer of rural blues and folk music, a man who had been born into abject conditions in South Carolina during the Jim Crow years. As a young black singer, he was initially dubbed "the Singing Christian" (he sang some Gospel songs, and was the son of a preacher), but he also recorded blues songs under the name Pinewood Tom. Later discovered by John H. Hammond and groomed for both stage performance and a major-label recording career, his repertoire expanded to include urban blues, jazz, and gleanings from a broad folk repertoire, in addition to rural blues and gospel. White gained a very wide following in the 1940s and had a huge influence on later blues artists and groups, as well as the general folk-music scene. His pro-justice and civil-rights stances provoked harsh treatment during the suspicious HUAC era, seriously harming his performing career in the 1950s and keeping him off television until 1963. In folk-music circles, however, he retained respect and was admired both as a musical hero and a link with the Southern rural-blues and gospel traditions.
- Harry Belafonte, another influential performer inspired in part by Paul Robeson, started his career as a club singer in New York to pay for his acting classes. In 1952, he signed a contract with RCA Victor and released his first record album, Mark Twain and Other Folk Favorites. His breakthrough album Calypso (1956) was the first LP to sell over a million copies. The album spent 31 weeks at number one, 58 weeks in the top ten, and 99 weeks on the US charts. It introduced American audiences to Calypso music, and Belafonte was dubbed the "King of Calypso". Belafonte went on to record in many genres, including blues, American folk, gospel, and more. Odetta sang "Water Boy" and performed a duet with Belafonte of "There's a Hole in My Bucket" that hit the national charts in 1961.
- Odetta Holmes – Starting in 1953 singers Odetta and Larry Mohr recorded some songs, with the LP being released in 1954 as Odetta and Larry, an album that was partially recorded live at San Francisco's Tin Angel bar. Odetta enjoyed a long and respected career, with a repertoire of traditional songs (e.g., spirituals) and blues until her death in 2008, becoming known as "the Voice of the Civil Rights Movement", and "the Queen of American Folk Music" (Martin Luther King Jr.).
- The Kingston Trio was formed in 1957 in the Palo Alto, California area by Bob Shane, Nick Reynolds, and Dave Guard, who were just out of college. They were greatly influenced by the Weavers, the calypso sounds of Belafonte, and other semi-pop folk artists such as the Gateway Singers and The Tarriers. The unexpected and surprising influence of their hit record "Tom Dooley" (which sold almost four million units and is often credited with initiating the pop music aspect of the folk revival) and the unprecedented popularity and album sales of this group from 1957 to 1963, including fourteen top ten and five number-one LPs on the Billboard charts, were significant factors in creating a commercial and mainstream audience for folk-style music where little had existed prior to their emergence. The Kingston Trio's success was followed by other highly successful 60s pop-folk acts, such as The Limeliters and The Highwaymen (whose version of "Michael, Row the Boat Ashore" reached No. 1 on the U.S. hit parade in September 1961).
- Dave Van Ronk was a mainstay of the scene, the so-called "Mayor of Macdougal Street". He was a mentor and inspiration for Tom Paxton, Christine Lavin, Joni Mitchell, Ramblin' Jack Elliott, and Bob Dylan (who described Van Ronk as "the king who reigned supreme" in the Village)
- The Brothers Four: Their first album, The Brothers Four, released toward the end of the year, made the top 20. Other highlights of their early career included singing their fourth single, "The Green Leaves of Summer", from the John Wayne movie The Alamo, at the 1961 Academy Awards. Their third album, BMOC: Best Music On/Off Campus, was a top 10 LP. They also recorded the title song for the Hollywood film Five Weeks in a Balloon in 1962 and the theme song for the ABC television series Hootenanny.
- Phil Ochs is most known for his topical songs such as "I Ain't Marching Anymore" and "Draft Dodger Rag", but he can also be credited as one of the major figures in the antiwar movement during the Vietnam War. Ochs started a rally in Los Angeles and penned "The War is Over" detailing the cause. He also wrote gentler and more poetic tunes such as "When I'm Gone" and "Changes".
- Joan Baez's career got started in 1958 in Cambridge, Massachusetts, where at 17 she gave her first coffee-house concert. She was invited to perform at the 1959 Newport Folk Festival by pop-folk star Bob Gibson, after which Baez was sometimes called "the barefoot Madonna", gaining renown for her clear voice and three-octave range. She recorded her first album for an established label the following year – a collection of laments and traditional folk ballads from the British Isles, accompanying the songs with guitar. Her second LP release went gold, as did her next (live) albums. One record featured her rendition of a song by the then-unknown Bob Dylan. In the early 1960s, Baez moved into the forefront of the American folk-music revival. Increasingly, her personal convictions – peace, social justice, anti-poverty – were reflected in the topical songs that made up a growing portion of her repertoire, to the point that Baez became a symbol for these particular concerns.
- Bob Dylan often performed and sometimes toured with Joan Baez, starting when she was a singer of mostly traditional songs. As Baez adopted some of Dylan's songs into her repertoire and introduced Dylan to her avid audiences, it helped the young songwriter to gain initial recognition. By the time Dylan recorded his first LP (1962), he had developed a style reminiscent of Woody Guthrie. He began to write songs that captured the "progressive" mood on the college campuses and in the coffee houses. Though by 1964 there were many new guitar-playing singer-songwriters, it is arguable that Dylan eventually became the most popular of these younger folk-music-revival performers.
- Peter, Paul, and Mary debuted in the early 1960s and were an American trio who ultimately became one of the biggest musical acts of the 1960s. The trio was composed of Peter Yarrow, Paul Stookey and Mary Travers. They were one of the main folk music torchbearers of social commentary music in that decade. During the 1960s, they won five Grammy Awards. As the decade passed, their music incorporated more elements of pop and rock.
- Judy Collins, sometimes known as "Judy Blue Eyes", debuted in the early 1960s. At first, she sang traditional folk songs or songs written by others – in particular the protest poets of the time, such as Tom Paxton, Phil Ochs, and Bob Dylan. She also recorded her own versions of important songs from the period, such as Dylan's "Mr. Tambourine Man", Ian Tyson's "Someday Soon", and Pete Seeger's "Turn, Turn, Turn". Collins eventually started writing her own songs, several of which became hits both for herself and for other artists.
- The Smothers Brothers, composed of Tom and Dick Smothers, used comedy to promote folk music on their CBS-TV variety series (1967–1969), along with social protest against the Vietnam War et al. They had many notable music guests such as blacklisted folk singer Pete Seeger.

=== Gallery ===
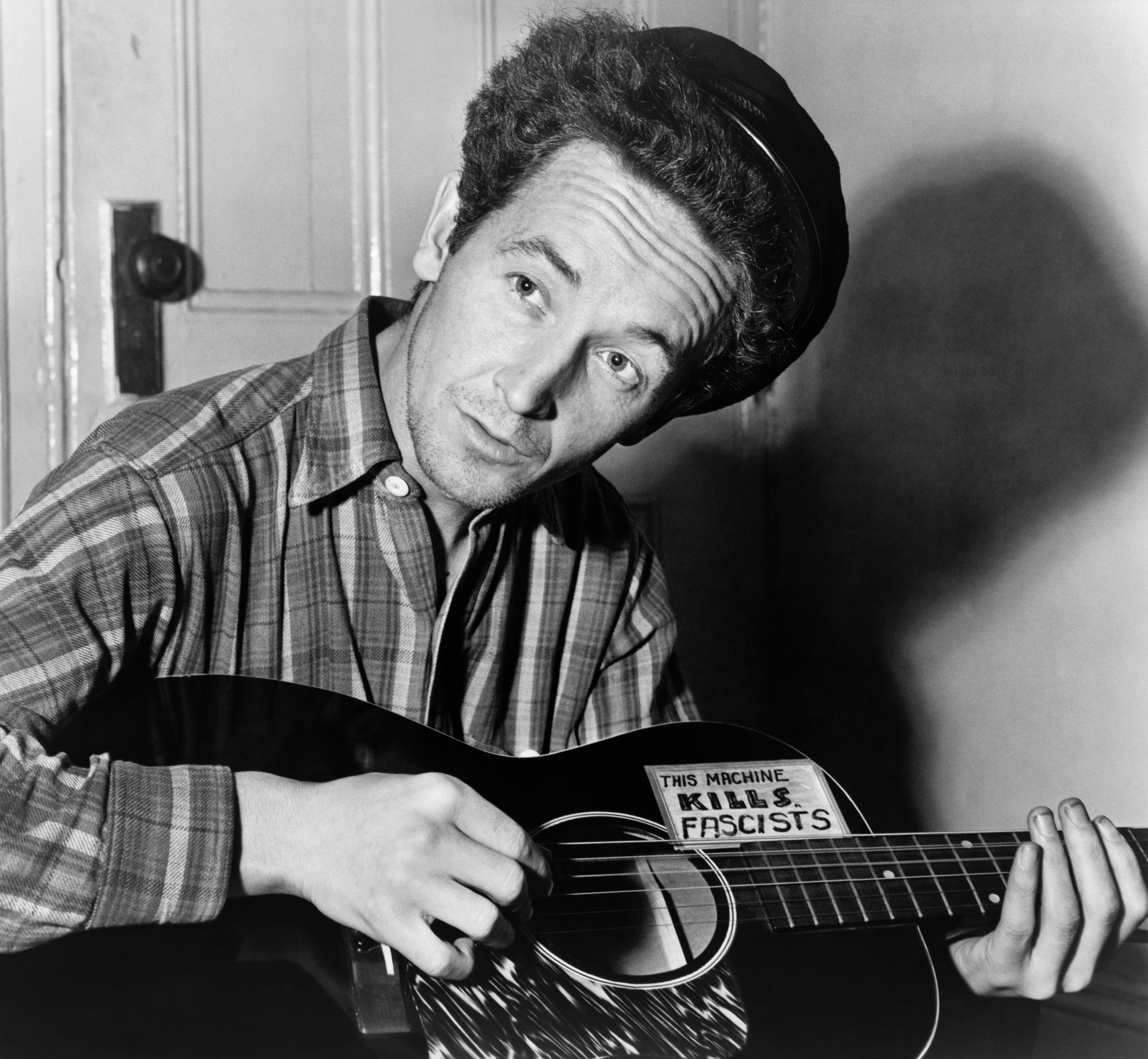
Woody Guthrie in 1943

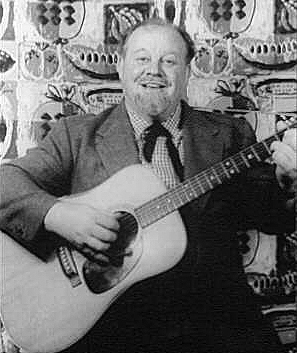
Burl Ives in 1955

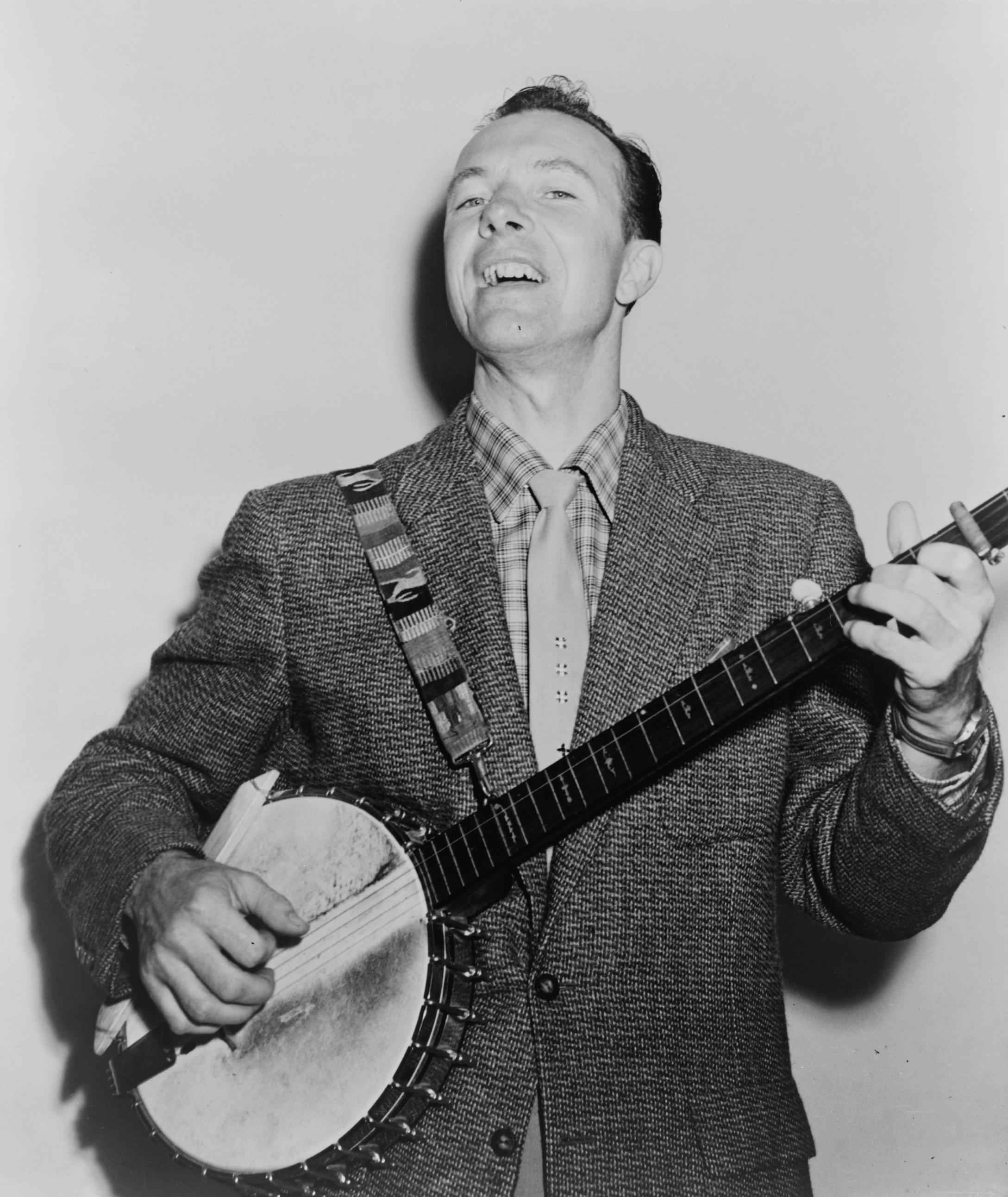
Pete Seeger in 1955

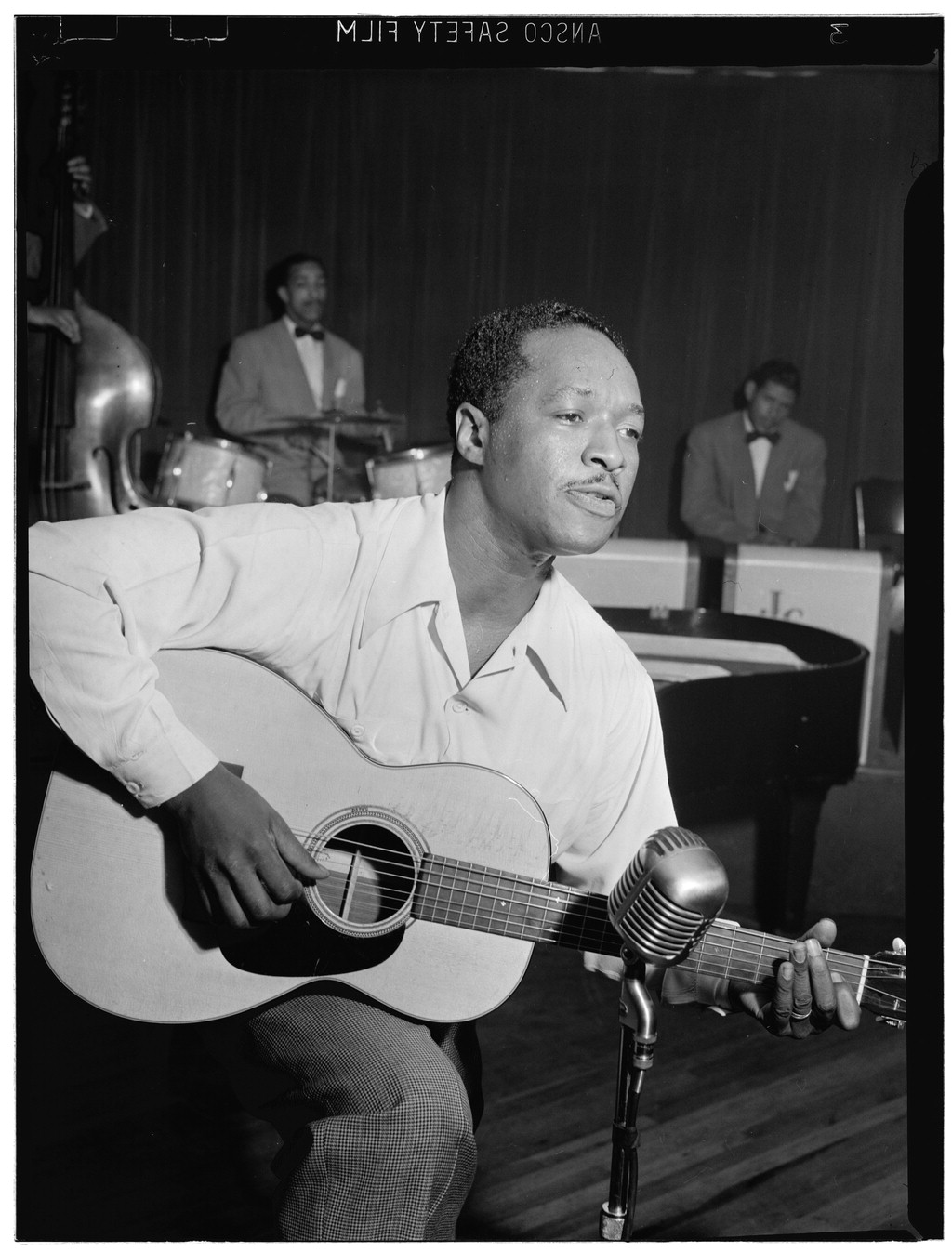
Josh White, Café Society (Downtown), New York, N.Y., c. June 1946

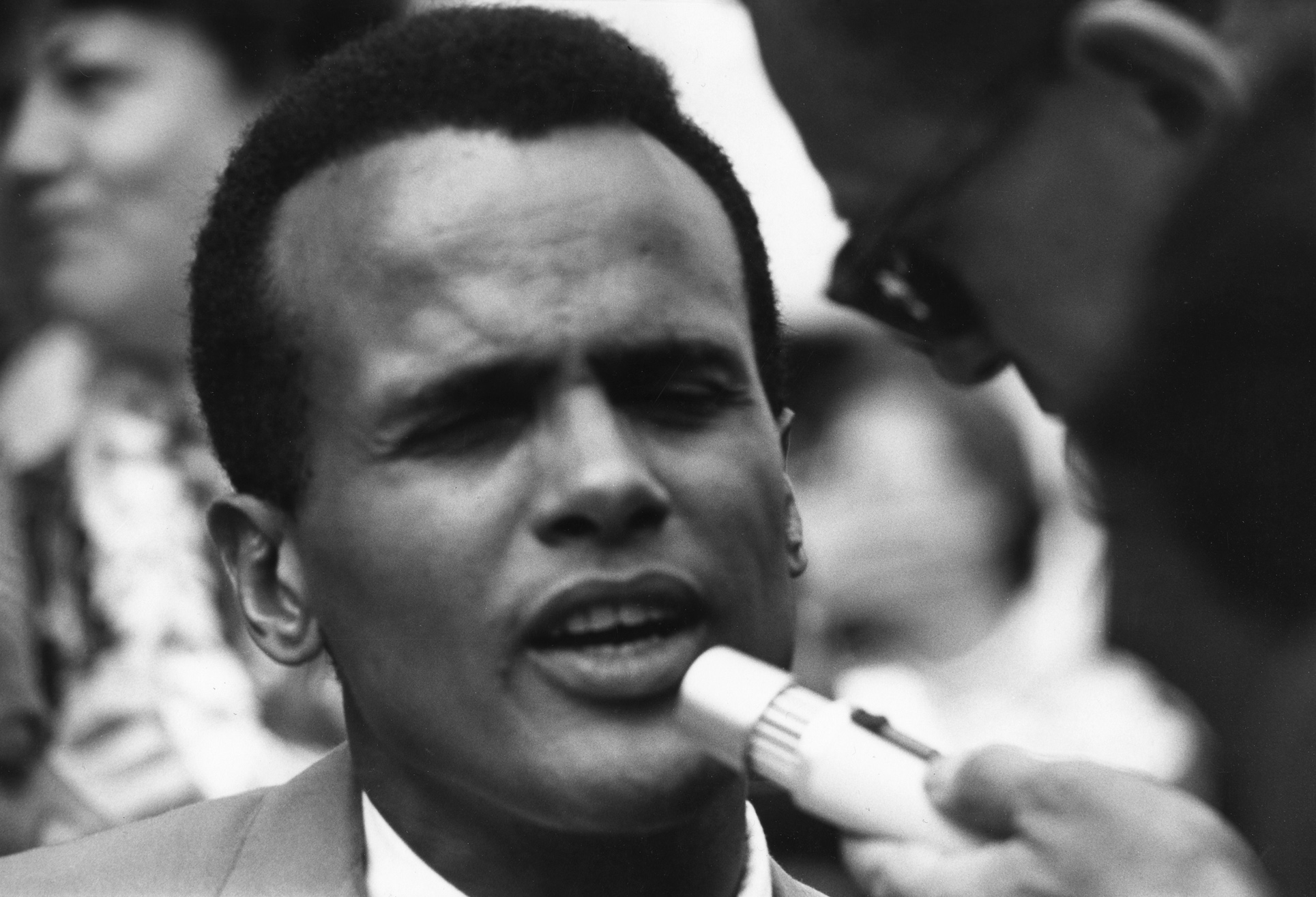
Harry Belafonte speaking at the 1963 Civil Rights March on Washington, D.C.

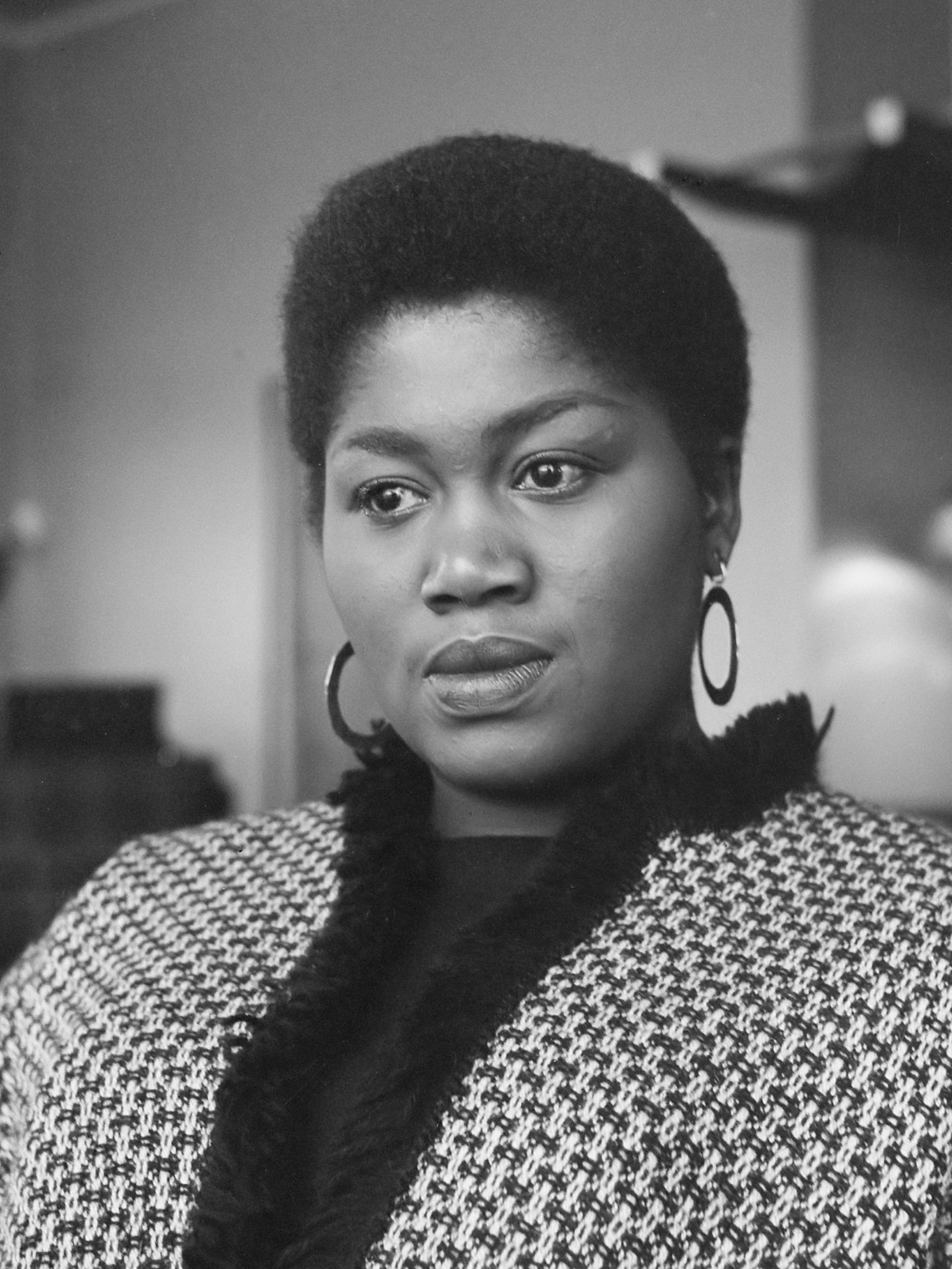
Odetta, 1961

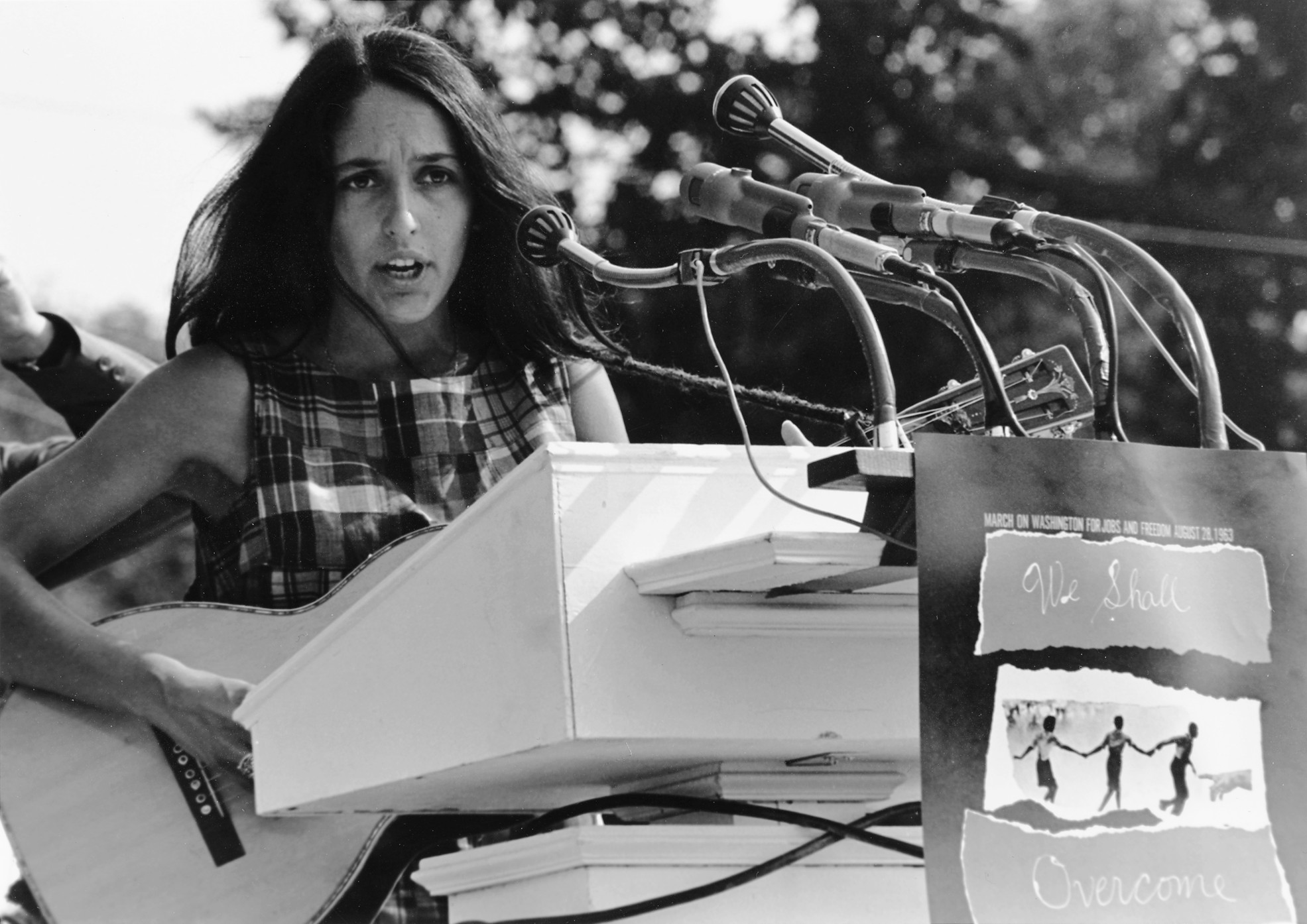
Joan Baez playing at the March on Washington in August 1963

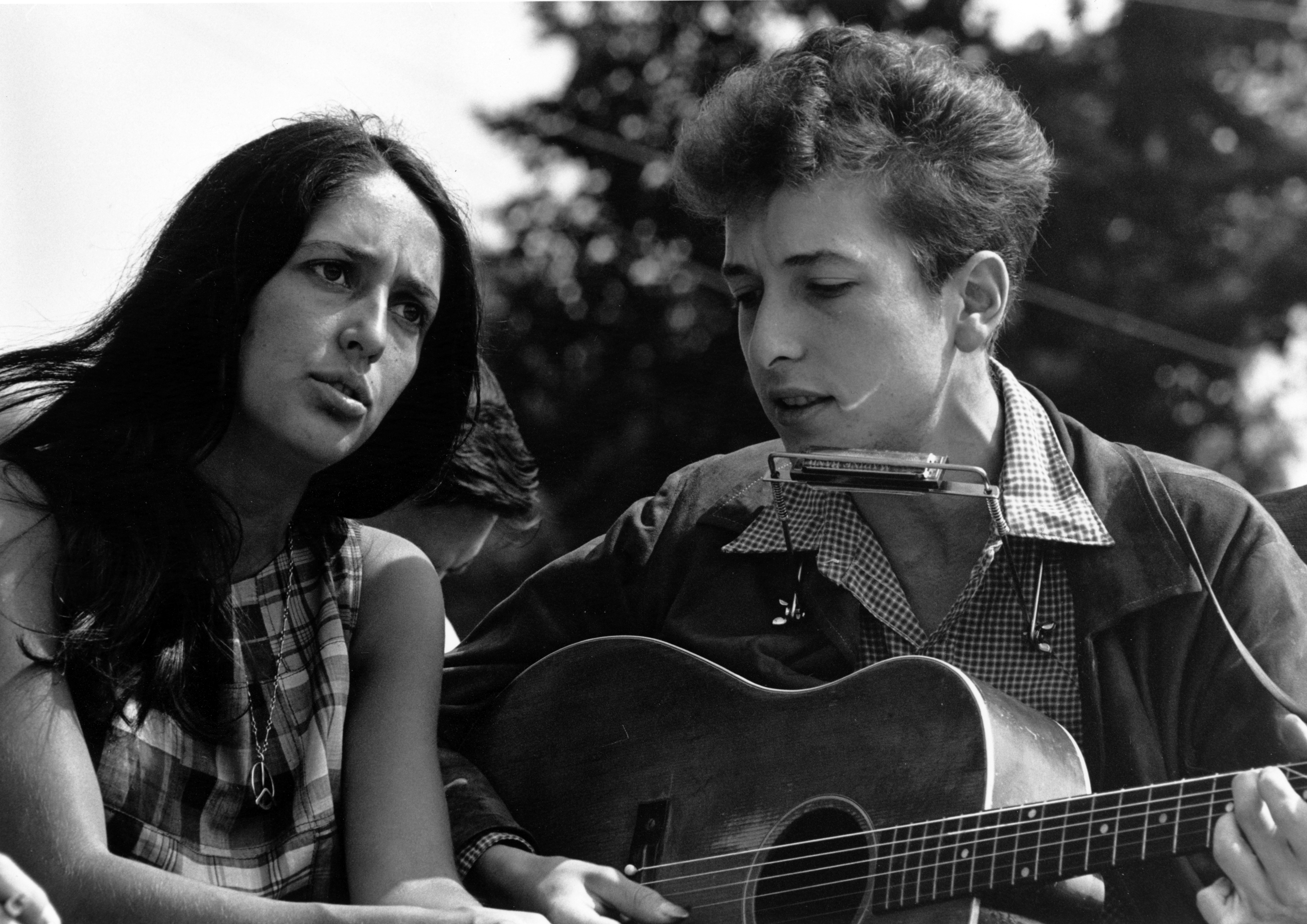
Joan Baez and Bob Dylan at the March on Washington, 1963

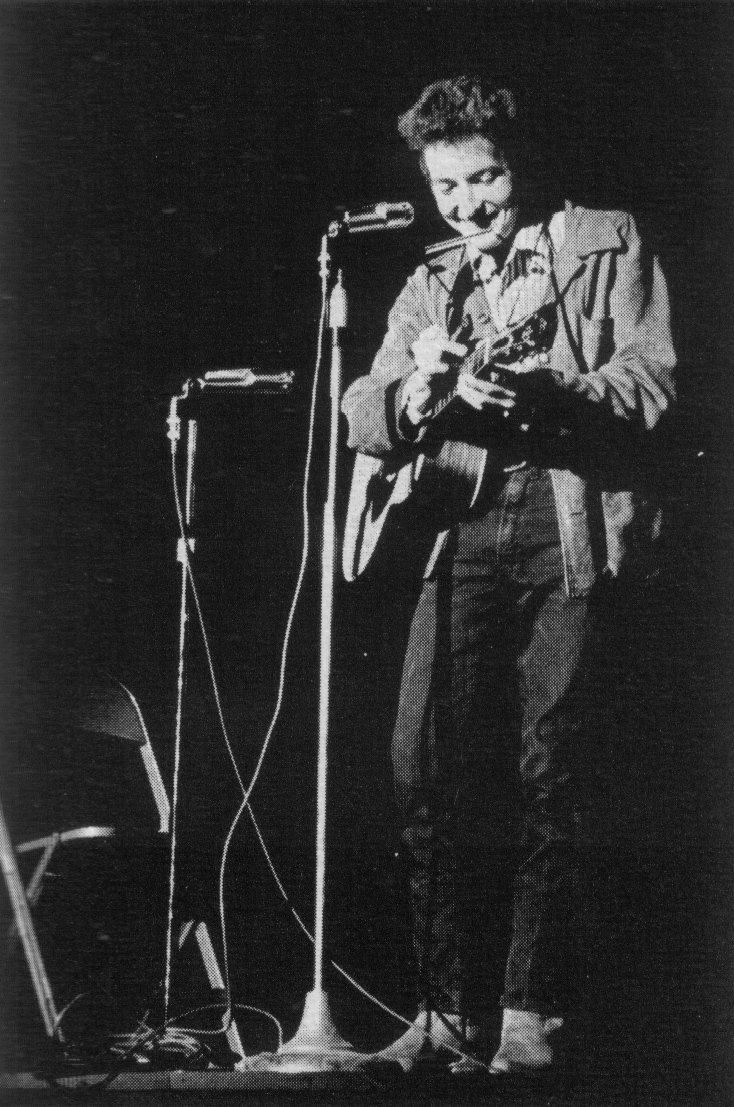
Bob Dylan in November 1963

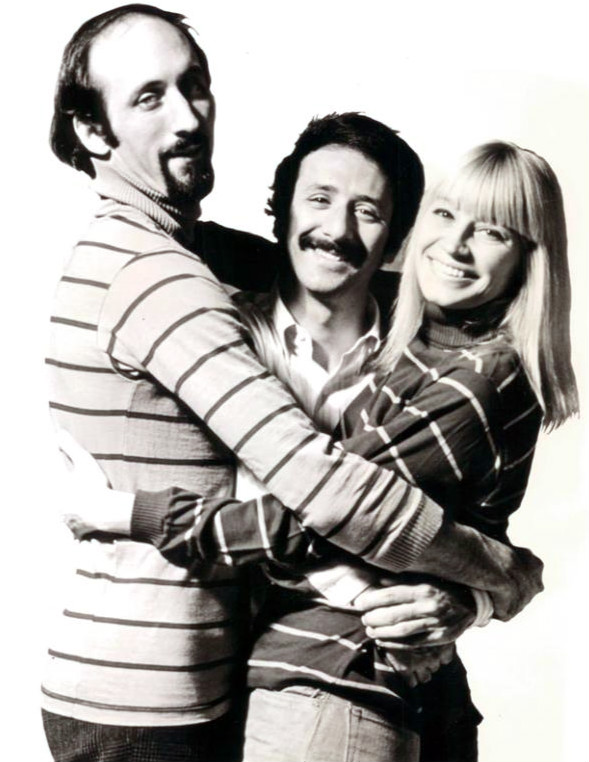
Peter, Paul and Mary

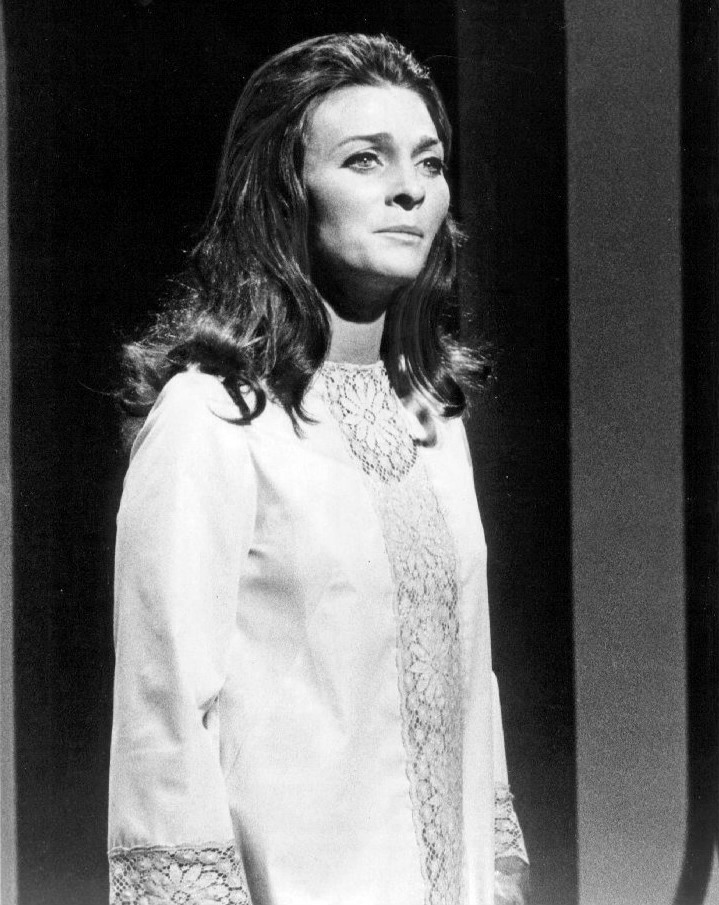
Judy Collins performing on The Smothers Brothers Comedy Hour, 1967

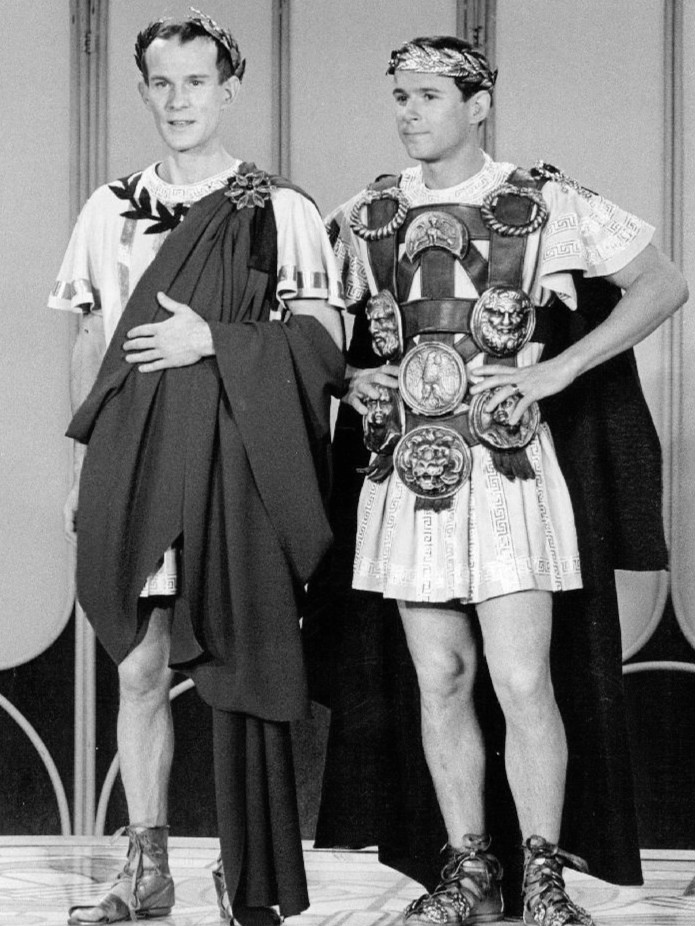
The Smothers Brothers in 1967

=== Other performers ===
- Eric Andersen
- Leon Bibb
- David Blue
- David Bromberg
- Bud & Travis
- Guy Carawan
- Johnny Cash
- Harry Chapin
- Sam Charters
- Guy Clark
- Paul Clayton
- John Cohen
- Leonard Cohen
- Shawn Colvin
- Elizabeth Cotten
- Karen Dalton
- Barbara Dane
- Erik Darling
- John Denver
- Donovan
- Ramblin' Jack Elliott
- Logan English
- Even Dozen Jug Band
- Mimi Fariña
- Richard Fariña
- Jackson C. Frank
- The Freedom Singers
- Gale Garnett
- Gateway Singers
- Bob Gibson
- Cynthia Gooding
- The Greenbriar Boys
- David Grisman
- Stefan Grossman
- John P. Hammond
- Tim Hardin
- Richie Havens
- Lee Hays
- John Herald
- Carolyn Hester
- Joe Hickerson
- The Highwaymen (folk band)
- David Holt (musician)
- The Holy Modal Rounders
- Cisco Houston
- Janis Ian
- Skip James
- Joe and Eddie
- Lisa Kindred
- Kossoy Sisters
- Peter La Farge
- Bruce Langhorne
- Gordon Lightfoot
- The Lovin' Spoonful
- Ewan MacColl
- Ed McCurdy
- Roger McGuinn
- Maria Muldaur
- Geoff Muldaur
- Jo Mapes
- Joni Mitchell
- Bob Neuwirth
- New Lost City Ramblers
- Tom Paxton
- Malvina Reynolds
- Fritz Richmond
- Gil Robbins
- The Rooftop Singers
- Dick Rosmini
- Tom Rush
- Tony Saletan
- John Sebastian
- Mike Seeger
- Peggy Seeger
- The Serendipity Singers
- Simon & Garfunkel
- Patrick Sky
- Rosalie Sorrels
- Ellen Stekert
- The Tarriers
- Artie Traum
- Happy Traum
- Ian and Sylvia
- Eric Von Schmidt
- The Washington Squares
- Doc Watson
- Gillian Welch
- Hedy West
- Robin and Linda Williams
- Glenn Yarborough

=== Managers ===
- Albert Grossman
- Harold Leventhal
- Victor Maymudes
- Fred Weintraub
- Frank Werber

=== Venues ===
- The Bitter End
- Cafe Au Go Go
- Caffè Lena
- Cafe Wha?
- Club Passim
- Eighth Step Coffee House
- Gate of Horn
- Gerdes Folk City
- The Gaslight Cafe
- Hungry i
- The Ice House (comedy club)
- The Main Point
- The Purple Onion
- Shaker Village Work Group
- The Tin Angel
- The Troubadour
- Village Vanguard

=== Periodicals ===
- Broadside
- People's Songs
- Sing Out!

== See also ==
- American folk music
- Anthology of American Folk Music
- British folk revival
- Contemporary folk music
- Festival
- Folk club
- Folk music
- Folk rock
- Folkways Records
- Hootenanny (U.S. TV series)
- March on Washington for Jobs and Freedom
- A Mighty Wind
- Newport Folk Festival
- New Weird America
- No Direction Home
- A Prairie Home Companion
- Protest songs in the United States
- Roots revival

== Bibliography ==
- Cantwell, Robert. When We Were Good: The Folk Revival. Cambridge: Harvard University Press, 1996. ISBN 0-674-95132-8
- Cohen, Ronald D., Folk music: the basics, Routledge, 2006.
- Cohen, Ronald D., A history of folk music festivals in the United States, Scarecrow Press, 2008
- Cohen, Ronald D. Rainbow Quest: The Folk Music Revival & American Society, 1940–1970. Amherst: University of Massachusetts Press, 2002. ISBN 1-55849-348-4
- Cohen, Ronald D., ed. Wasn't That a Time? Firsthand Accounts of the Folk Music Revival. American Folk Music Series no. 4. Lanham, Maryland and Folkestone, UK: The Scarecrow Press, Inc. 1995.
- Cohen, Ronald D., and Dave Samuelson. Songs for Political Action. Booklet to Bear Family Records BCD 15720 JL, 1996.
- Cray, Ed, and Studs Terkel. Ramblin Man: The Life and Times of Woody Guthrie. W.W. Norton & Co., 2006.
- Cunningham, Agnes "Sis", and Gordon Friesen. Red Dust and Broadsides: A Joint Autobiography. Amherst: University of Massachusetts Press, 1999. ISBN 1-55849-210-0
- De Turk, David A.; Poulin, A. Jr., The American folk scene; dimensions of the folksong revival, New York : Dell Pub. Co., 1967
- Denisoff, R. Serge. Great Day Coming: Folk Music and the American Left. Urbana: University of Illinois Press, 1971.
- Denisoff, R. Serge. Sing Me a Song of Social Significance. Bowling Green University Popular Press, 1972. ISBN 0-87972-036-0
- Denning, Michael. The Cultural Front: The Laboring of American Culture in the Twentieth Century. London: Verso, 1996.
- Donaldson, Rachel Clare, Music for the People: the Folk Music Revival And American Identity, 1930–1970, PhD Dissertation, Vanderbilt University, May 2011, Nashville, Tennessee
- Dunaway, David. How Can I Keep From Singing: The Ballad of Pete Seeger. [1981, 1990] Villard, 2008. ISBN 0-306-80399-2
- Eyerman, Ron, and Scott Barretta. "From the 30s to the 60s: The folk Music Revival in the United States". Theory and Society: 25 (1996): 501–43.
- Eyerman, Ron, and Andrew Jamison. Music and Social Movements. Mobilizing Traditions in the Twentieth Century. Cambridge University Press, 1998. ISBN 0-521-62966-7
- Filene, Benjamin. Romancing the Folk: Public Memory & American Roots Music. Chapel Hill: The University of North Carolina Press, 2000. ISBN 0-8078-4862-X
- Goldsmith, Peter D. Making People's Music: Moe Asch and Folkways Records. Washington, DC: Smithsonian Institution Press, 1998. ISBN 1-56098-812-6
- Hajdu, David. Positively 4th Street: The Lives and Times of Joan Baez, Bob Dylan, Mimi Baez Fariña and Richard Fariña. New York: North Point Press, 2001. ISBN 0-86547-642-X
- Hawes, Bess Lomax. Sing It Pretty. Urbana and Chicago: University of Illinois Press, 2008
- Jackson, Bruce, ed. Folklore and Society. Essay in Honor of Benjamin A. Botkin. Hatboro, Pa Folklore Associates, 1966
- Lieberman, Robbie. "My Song Is My Weapon:" People's Songs, American Communism, and the Politics of Culture, 1930–50. 1989; Urbana: University of Illinois Press, 1995. ISBN 0-252-06525-5
- Lomax, Alan, Woody Guthrie, and Pete Seeger, eds. Hard Hit Songs for Hard Hit People. New York: Oak Publications, 1967. Reprint, Lincoln University of Nebraska Press, 1999.
- Lynch, Timothy. Strike Song of the Depression (American Made Music Series). Jackson: University Press of Mississippi, 2001.
- Mitchell, Gillian, The North American folk music revival: nation and identity in the United States and Canada, 1945–1980, Ashgate Publishing, Ltd., 2007
- Reuss, Richard, with [finished posthumously by] Joanne C. Reuss. American Folk Music and Left Wing Politics. 1927–1957. American Folk Music Series no. 4. Lanham, Maryland and Folkestone, UK: The Scarecrow Press, Inc. 2000.
- Rubeck, Jack; Shaw, Allan; Blake, Ben et al. The Kingston Trio On Record. Naperville, IL: KK, Inc, 1986. ISBN 978-0-9614594-0-6
- Scully, Michael F. The Never-Ending Revival: Rounder Records and the Folk Alliance. Urbana: University of Illinois Press, 2008.
- Seeger, Pete. Where Have All the Flowers Gone: A Singer's Stories. Bethlehem, Pa.: Sing Out Publications, 1993.
- "The Smothers Brothers". The Sixties in America Reference Library. Encyclopedia.com. 6 Apr. 2021 <Encyclopedia.com | Free Online Encyclopedia>.
- Willens, Doris. Lonesome Traveler: The Life of Lee Hays. New York: Norton, 1988.
- Weissman, Dick. Which Side Are You On? An Inside History of the Folk Music Revival in America. New York: Continuum, 2005. ISBN 0-8264-1698-5
- Wolfe, Charles, and Kip Lornell. The Life and Legend of Leadbelly. New York: Da Capo [1992] 1999.
