= Folk club =

Venue devoted to traditional or folk music

A folk club is a regular event, permanent venue, or section of a venue devoted to folk music and traditional music. Folk clubs were primarily an urban phenomenon of 1960s and 1970s Great Britain and Ireland, and vital to the second British folk revival, but continue today there and elsewhere. In America, as part of the American folk music revival, they played a key role not only in acoustic music, but in launching the careers of groups that later became rock and roll acts.

== British clubs ==
=== Origins ===
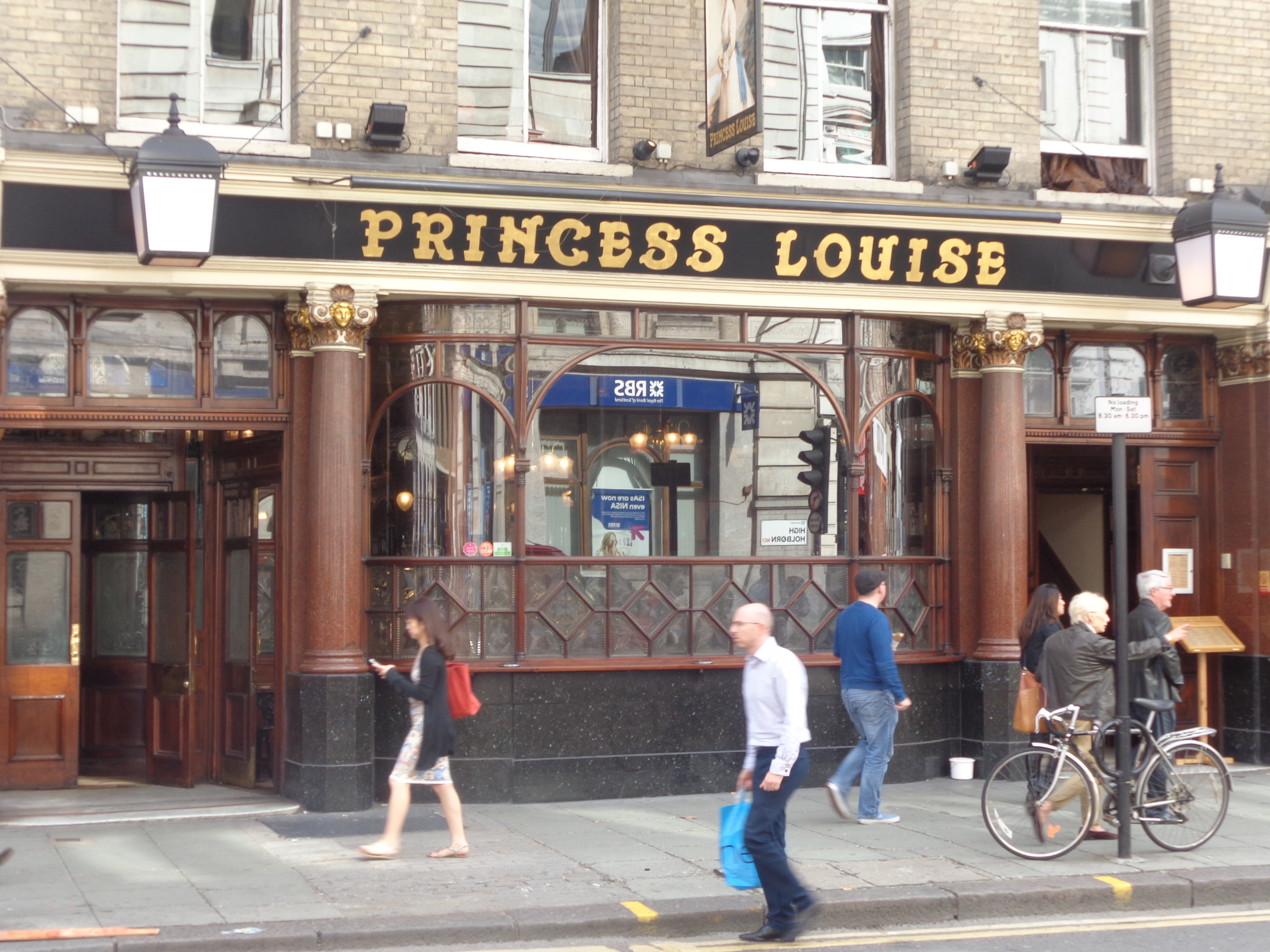
The "Princess Louise", Holborn

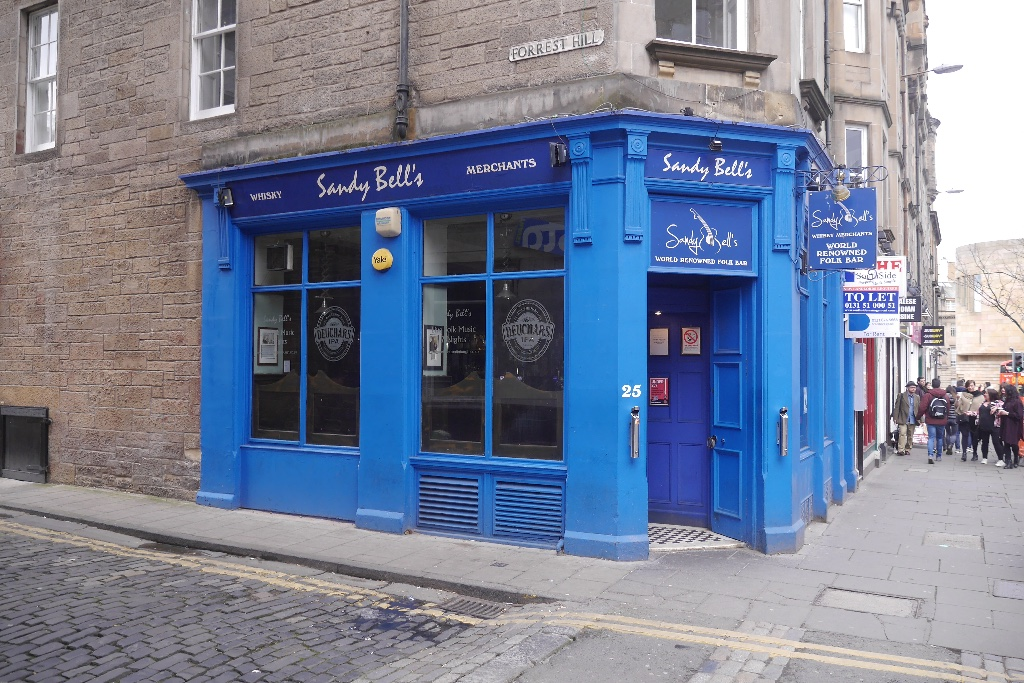
Sandy Bell's, Edinburgh

From the end of the Second World War there had been attempts by the English Folk Dance and Song Society in London and Birmingham to form clubs where traditional music could be performed. By the mid-1950s, a few private clubs, such as the Good Earth Club and the politically charged Topic Club in London, began to offer spaces for folk music, but the folk club movement received its major boost from the short-lived British skiffle craze, from about 1955 to 1959, creating a demand for opportunities to play versions of American folk, blues and jazz music, often on assorted acoustic and improvised instruments. This included, as the name suggests, the 'Ballad and Blues' club in The Round House, Wardour Street, Soho, co-founded by Ewan MacColl, although the date and nature of the club in its early years is disputed.

As the craze subsided from the mid-1950s many of these clubs began to shift towards the performance of English traditional folk material, partly as a reaction to the growth of American dominated pop and rock n’ roll music. The Ballad and Blues Club became the ‘Singer Club’ and, in 1961 moved to the Princess Louise pub in Holborn, with the emphasis increasingly placed on English traditional music and singing the songs of one's own culture, e.g. English singers should avoid imitating Americans and vice versa, using authentic acoustic instruments and styles of accompaniment. This led to the creation of strict 'policy clubs', that pursued a pure and traditional form of music. This became the model for a rapidly expanding movement and soon every major city in Britain had its own folk club.

By the mid-1960s there were probably over 300 in Britain, providing an important circuit for acts that performed traditional songs and tunes acoustically, where some could sustain a living by playing to a small but committed audience. Scottish folk clubs were less dogmatic than their English counterparts and continued to encourage a mixture of Scottish, Irish, English and American material. Early on they hosted traditional performers, including Donald Higgins and the Stewarts of Blairgowrie, beside English performers and new Scottish revivalists such as Robin Hall (1936–98), Jimmie Macgregor (born 1930) and The Corries. Some of the most influential clubs in the UK included Les Cousins, Bunjies and The Troubadour, in London and the Bristol Troubadour in England's West Country. In Scotland there were notable clubs in Aberdeen. Edinburgh (Edinburgh Folk Club) and Glasgow.

=== Nature ===
Although the name suggests a fixed space, most clubs were simply a regular gathering, usually in the back or upstairs room of a public house on a weekly basis. These clubs were largely an urban phenomenon and most members seem to have been from the urbanised middle classes, although the material that was increasingly their focus was that of the rural (and to a lesser extent industrial) working classes. The clubs were known for the amateur nature of their performances, often including, or even focusing on local ‘floor singers’, of members who would step up to sing one or two songs. They also had ‘residents’, usually talented local performers who would perform regular short sets of songs. In the late 1960s and early 1970s especially in the West country there was quite a revival of local folk clubs with regular weekly gatherings in places like Taunton, Halberton, Ottery St Mary, Exeter, Barnstaple, Truro, Padstow where a new group of local performers such as Cyril Tawney performed regularly along with local singers performing "Come all Ye" nights

Many of these later emerged as major performers in their own right, including A.L. Lloyd, Martin Carthy, and Shirley Collins who were able to tour the clubs as a circuit and who also became major recording artists. A later generation of performers used the folk club circuit for highly successful mainstream careers, including Billy Connolly, Jasper Carrott, Ian Dury and Barbara Dickson.

=== Later years ===
The number of clubs began to decline in the 1980s, in the face of changing musical and social trends. In London Les Cousins in Greek Street, where John Renbourn often played, and The Scots Hoose in Cambridge Circus, were both casualties. The Singers Club (George IV, Lincoln's Inn) closed its doors in 1993.

The decline began to stabilise in the mid-1990s with the resurgence of interest in folk music and there are now over 160 folk clubs in the United Kingdom, including many that can trace their origins back to the 1950s including The Bridge Folk Club in Newcastle (previously called the Folk Song and Ballad club) claims to the oldest club still in existence in its original venue (1953). In Edinburgh, Sandy Bell's club in Forest Hill has been running since the late 1960s. In London, the Troubadour at Earl's Court, where Bob Dylan, Paul Simon, Sandy Denny and Martin Carthy sang, became a poetry club in the 1990s, but is now a folk club again.

The nature of surviving folk clubs has also changed significantly, many larger clubs use PA systems, opening the door to use of electric instruments, although drums and full electric line-ups remain rare. The mix of music often includes American roots music, blues, British folk rock, and world music as well as traditional British folk music. From 2000, the BBC Radio 2 Folk Awards have included an award for the best folk club.

Since 2002 A "public entertainment licence" was required from local authorities for almost any kind of public performance of music. To avoid the constant need to re-apply for licences for new events, some folk clubs opted to create a "Private members club" instead. This required that members of the public join at least 24 hours in advance, not on the night of the actual performance. Licensing laws changed over the following years. As a result of changes by the Live Music Act 2012, for example, live music in on-licensed premises is no longer a licensable activity between 08:00 and 23:00 hours before audiences of up to 200 people.

== Irish clubs ==
A revival of Irish traditional music took place around the turn of the 20th century, which included feiseanna, céilís and organised music competitions. Dancing and singing took place at well-known venues where local and itinerant musicians were welcome. An older style of singing called sean-nós ("in the old style"), which is a form of traditional Irish singing was still found, mainly for very poetic songs in the Irish language. Under pressure from the clergy and the government of the time these were forced to curtail their activities.

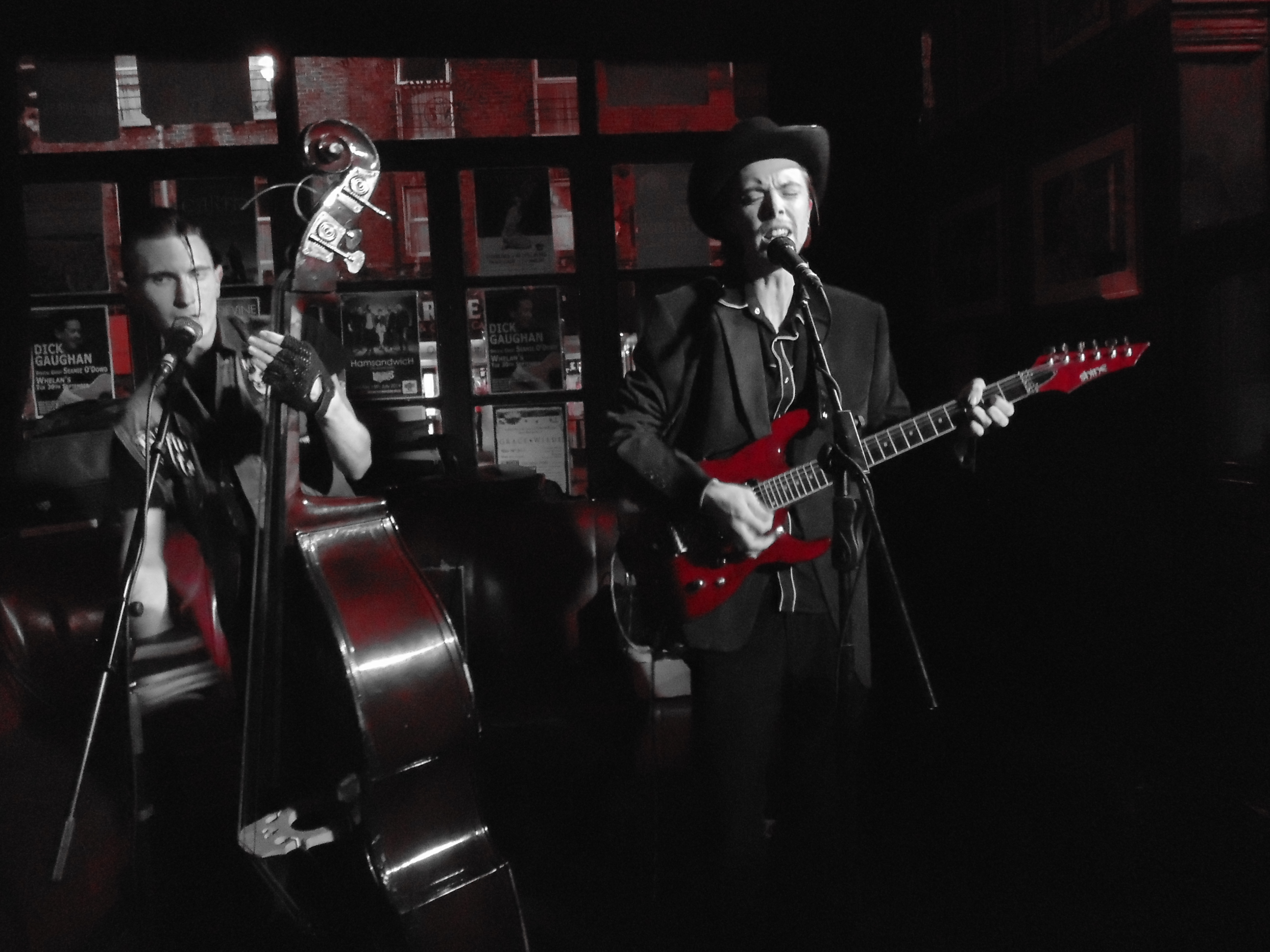
The Dublin City Rounders at Whelan's

After a decline through the nineteen forties, an effort was made by a group of pipers to revive the folk tradition. The first national festival of Irish traditional music was held in Mullingar in 1951. In the same year Comhaltas Ceoltóirí Éireann was founded, dedicated to the promotion of the music, song, and dance of Ireland. Also, during the following years, came a growth of interest in the folk revival that was taking place in Britain and the US, and the success of The Clancy Brothers in the US. Folk clubs sprung up in Dublin and other Irish cities and towns in the early sixties, which were frequented by the likes of the Abbey Tavern Singers, The Dubliners, The Johnstons, The Pattersons, Tír na nÓg and Sweeney's Men.

The first folk club in Dublin was the Coffee Kitchen in Molesworth St., run by Pearse McCall, where Johnny Moynihan met Joe Dolan and Andy Irvine and formed Sweeney's Men. Johnny also played in the Neptune Folk Club on Cunningham Road, where he introduced the sea shanty to the Irish Folk Scene. The Auld Triangle was the favourite folk club of the Emmet Spiceland group. The Tradition Folk Club on Wednesdays in Slattery's of Capel Street hosted the Press Gang, Al O'Donnell, Frank Harte and others. The vocal group Garland had a loyal following on the Dublin folk circuit and continued singing as a group for about twenty five years. They mainly played in Dublin clubs such as The Coffee Kitchen, The Universal, The Swamp in Inchicore and The Neptune Folk Club. Garland eventually ran the Folk Club in the Blessington Inn (also known as the Blue Gardenia). They had such guests as Johnny Moynihan, Pumpkinhead and Tony McMahon. In the following decade groups such as The Barleycorn, the Dublin City Ramblers, Planxty and Clannad became popular on the folk scene. There was a weekly radio programme on the Dublin Folk Scene presented by Shay Healy. However the number of folk clubs as such declined after 1980, and at the same time there was a growth of popularity in pub sessions.

Also, Irish cultural centres have existed in the United Kingdom since the 1950s, primarily for the descendants of Irish immigrants. Mostly on Friday and Saturday nights these have been folk clubs in all but name. They have been able to book major Irish bands that ordinary folk clubs could not have afforded.

== American clubs ==
New York's Greenwich Village was the most famous nexus for folk clubs in the Sixties. While some music took place quite informally in Washington Square Park, a number of clubs, such as The Bitter End and Gerde's Folk City were also central to the development of what was originally called "folk music" but would evolve into "Singer–songwriter" music as more and more acoustic musicians performed original material. The Lovin' Spoonful is one example of a pop group that started in the folk world.

In Boston, the most famous venue was the Club 47, where Joan Baez got her start. Later, this became Passim's. (During most of the Seventies, local station WCAS (AM) produced a live broadcast from this club called "Live at Passim's"; today the club is known as Club Passim). Other lesser known clubs, such as the Turk's Head and the Sword in the Stone (on Charles Street) and, later, the Idler (in Cambridge), also helped to make up what was known as "The Boston Folk Scene". A number of lesser-known but still active musicians, such as Bill Staines and Chris Smither, also developed in this milieu.

Philadelphia offered two such non-alcohol clubs: Manny Rubin's tiny Second Fret (The New Lost City Ramblers, Ian and Sylvia, Lightnin' Hopkins), and, in the Bryn Mawr suburbs, Jeanette Campbell's The Main Point, an intimate club featuring artists on their way up such as Joni Mitchell, Janis Ian, Phil Ochs and Bruce Springsteen.

In California, one important San Francisco club was the hungry i; Los Angeles had The Troubadour and McCabe's Guitar Shop. The Freight and Salvage has been in operation since 1968.

Caffè Lena in Saratoga Springs, New York claims to be the oldest folk-oriented Coffee House, having opened in 1960. The Eighth Step Coffee House, originally in Albany, New York and now in Schenectady was founded in 1967.

While the folk boom gave way to its rock descendants, forcing many clubs to close or to move to more electric music, in recent years, a number of venues have offered acoustic music (usually original) in a way that continues at least part of the function of the folk clubs. Traditional music, however, which was at the root of these developments, is more often offered by local folk societies, such as Calliope: Pittsburgh Folk Music Society, Athens Folk Music and Dance Society, etc.

== See also ==
- British folk revival
- Pub session
