= Pub session =

Making music while at a pub

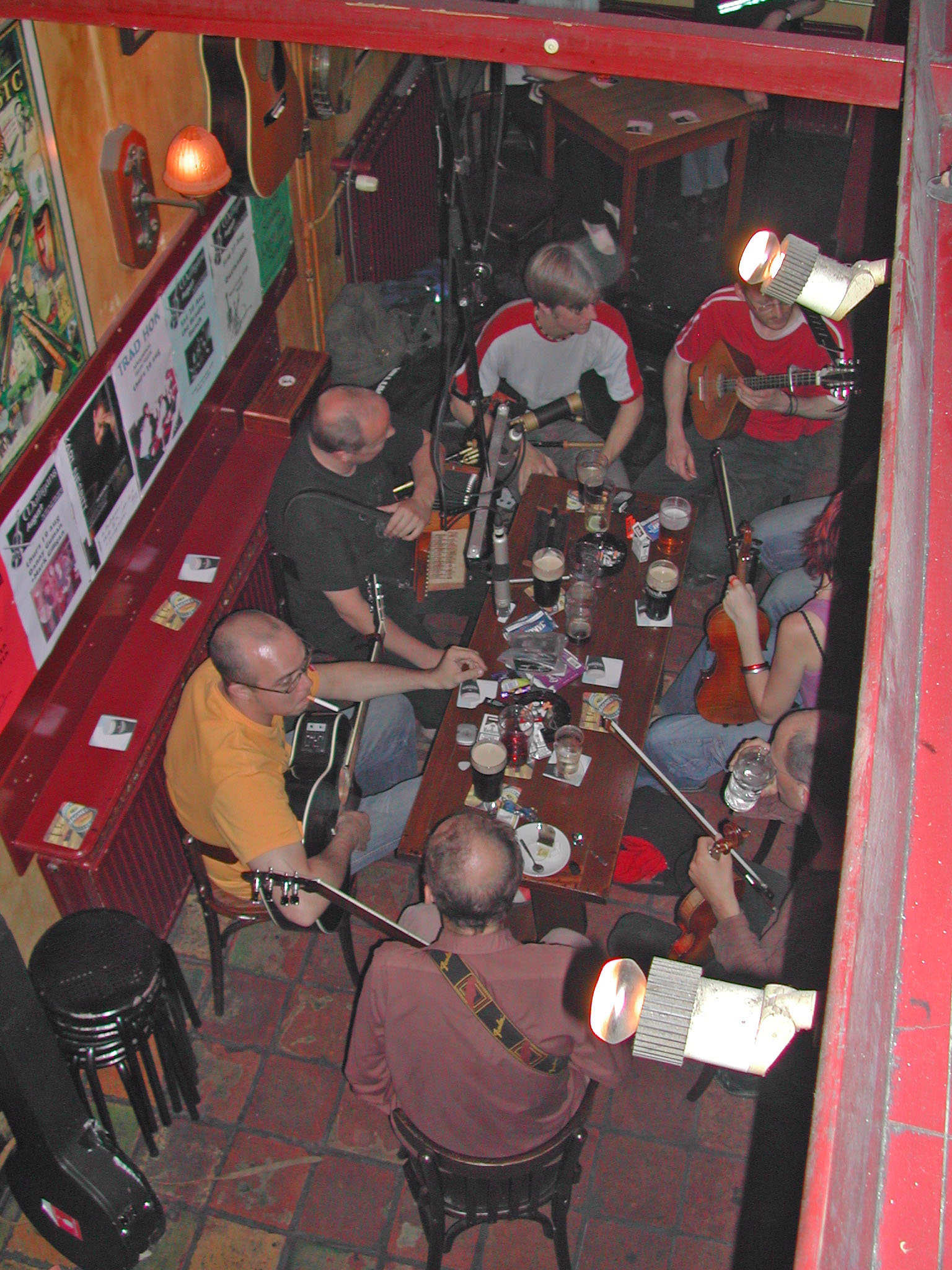
Irish music enthusiasts gather at a pub to play music and drink beer

A pub session (seisiún in Irish; seisean in Scottish Gaelic; seshoon in Manx Gaelic) is performing music in the setting of a local pub, in which the music-making is intermingled with the consumption of alcohol and conversation. Performers sing and/or play traditional songs and tunes most commonly from the Irish, English, Scottish, American, French-Canadian, Cornish, and Manx traditions, using instruments such as the fiddle, accordion, concertina, flute, tin whistle, uilleann pipes, tenor banjo, guitar, and bodhrán. Some sessions have dancing too.

== History ==
Singing and consuming alcohol have been practised together from ancient times, but the written evidence is fragmentary until the 16th century. In Shakespeare's Henry IV, Hal and Falstaff discuss drinking and playing the "tongs and the bones". There are depictions of pub singing in paintings by Teniers (1610–1690), Brouwer (1605/6-1638) and Jan Steen (1625/5-1656).

=== 1800 to 1950 ===
The 1830 Beer Act abolished the levy on beer - within a single year 400 new pubs opened, and within 8 years there were 46,000. This number peaked in the 1870s and declined after 1900. By the 1850s, an increasing number of student songs and commercial song-books were published across Europe. The most famous was the Scottish Students' Song Book by John Stuart Blackie (1809–1895). The mixture of traditional songs with hints of erotic humour continues to this day. The Irish tradition also benefited from the compilation of O'Neill's Music of Ireland, a compilation of 1,850 pieces of Irish session and dance music, published initially by Francis O'Neill (1848–1936) in 1903.

One of the most popular drinking songs, "Little Brown Jug," dates from the 1860s. By 1908 Percy Grainger had begun to record folk singers, but not in their natural habitat—the pub. In 1938 A.L. Lloyd persuaded his employers at the BBC to record the singers in the Eel's Foot pub in Eastbridge, Suffolk.

At The Eel's Foot, 1939–47, the songs performed included: "False Hearted Knight", "The Dark-Eyed Sailor", "The Princess Royal", "The Foggy Dew", "Underneath Her Apron", "Pleasant and Delightful", "The Blackbird." Surprisingly, one of the songs was "Poor Man's Heaven", an American IWW song dating from about 1920. The oldest singer there was William "Velvet" Brightwell (1865–1960). In 1947 the BBC made more recordings there and broadcast them as "Anglia Sings" on 19 November 1947. Almost all of the participants were in their 50s and 60s. Six years later the first folk club opened in Newcastle upon Tyne, and the average age was in the 20s.

== Instruments ==
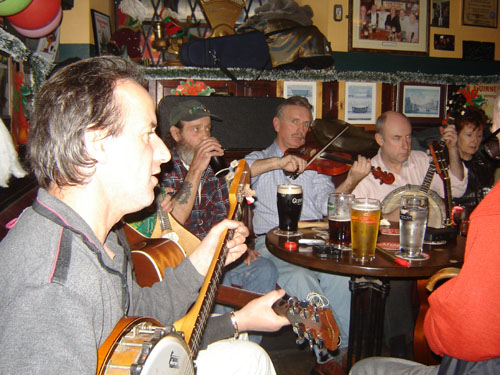
Various instruments being played at a pub session

The fiddle has predominated since the 17th century. The melodeon became popular in the 1890s. By the 1950s the accordion took over, particularly in Scotland. During the "folk revival" of the 1960s, the guitar was the instrument most frequently heard in a pub. Some sessions are also singing-only, commonly called "song sessions", "folk sings", or "singarounds".

=== Choosing an instrument ===
Each session has its own informal rules as to which instruments are acceptable and in what number. Some sessions may have a strict "'traditional' instruments only" rule whereas others will accept anyone who shows up to play with any instrument. The word traditional is used loosely as sessions themselves are a relatively recently revived phenomenon and some instruments considered 'traditional,' such as the Irish bouzouki, are in fact relatively new to the genres played at a session. It is wise to ask about what is expected at a particular session before bringing a non-'traditional' instrument.

Generally there can be an unlimited number of fiddles, flutes, accordions and tin whistles, instruments that play the melody of the tunes. The bodhrán is common in Irish sessions, but many sessions prefer that only one person play the bodhrán at a time. Some musicians play the bones or the spoons. Uilleann pipes are common in Irish sessions, but the more commonly known Great Highland Bagpipes are almost never used in a session, because they drown out other instruments; in Scotland the Scottish smallpipes are frequently heard instead. Chordal accompaniment instruments such as mandolins, banjos, citterns and bouzoukis are welcome in moderation. Guitars and dulcimers are frequently allowed in sessions without strict "'traditional' instruments only" rules.

== Etiquette ==
There are "open sessions", when anyone who wishes can play, and "closed sessions", where the playing is restricted to a group. The general rules are fairly simple, but depend on the kind of session. In general, pub sessions are not places for learning an instrument. It is expected that those taking part have attained competence in playing their instrument. Some sessions are wholly instrumental while others will engage the crowd with singing. It is customary to introduce oneself to the other participants before joining in. There will usually be a leader or oldest member who sets the tone and keeps the session running smoothly; often leader(s) do not appear to be leaders at all. Occasionally, even the leaders of a session may not realize that they lead.

Practically, however, there are always leaders at a session, by the nature of human dynamics. Some sessions follow a round-robin structure, others have a more free-for-all approach, and the leader(s) of a session should be observed to see how this particular session is run. Due to freeform nature of the session, there is always an element of serendipity and there is an atmosphere of anticipation and an expectation of tolerance from all present.

== Legal considerations ==
In England and Wales the Licensing Act 2003 came into force in 2005. It could be interpreted as meaning that any performer would be obliged to give prior notification to police, fire brigade and environmental health. Following much lobbying by various groups, the law settled down to allow "spontaneous" events and religious events.

== See also ==
- Folk clubs
- Irish traditional music session
- List of public house topics
