= Irish traditional music session =

Mostly informal gathering at which people play Irish traditional music

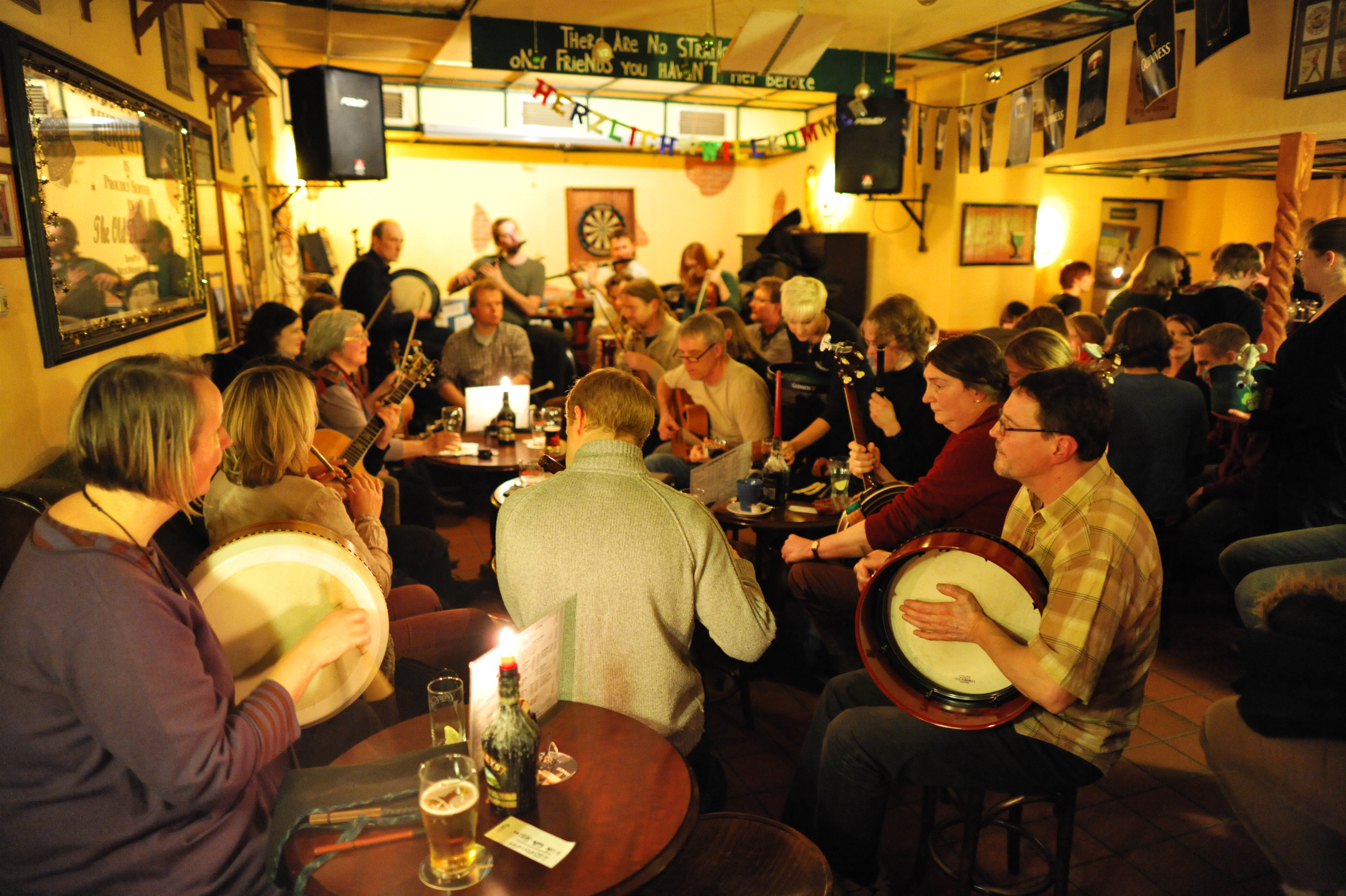
An Irish "trad session" in Hamburg, Germany

Irish traditional music sessions, also called trad sessions or simply sessions, are mostly informal gatherings at which people play Irish traditional music. The Irish language word for "session" is seisiún. This article discusses Irish tune-playing, although "session" can also refer to a singing session or a mixed session (tunes and songs); see the pub session article for a wider discussion of folk music sessions.

Barry Foy's Field Guide to the Irish Music Session defines a session as:

...a gathering of Irish traditional musicians for the purpose of celebrating their common interest in the music by playing it together in a relaxed, informal setting, while in the process generally beefing up the mystical cultural mantra that hums along uninterruptedly beneath all manifestations of Irishness worldwide.

== History ==
Before the 1940s, Irish traditional music (both in Ireland and the diaspora) was typically played in private homes and farmyards and occasionally at dance halls. In Ireland, the UK, and Canada most public houses ("pubs") and taverns were not legally allowed to host music in the early 20th century. This division between folk music at home and popular commercial music in bars held on to some in Eastern Canada, where the name "kitchen party" denotes a gathering of folk musicians.

In the post-war era, social dancing developed in new trends based on jazz and later rock and roll, which displaced traditional music from dance halls (a similar trend happened to Central European polka music in North America). The session as understood today was purportedly invented in 1946 at the Devonshire Arms pub in Kentish Town, London, UK by a group of Irish emigrants from the Irish west coast, particularly near the town of Tubbercurry.

== Social and cultural aspects ==
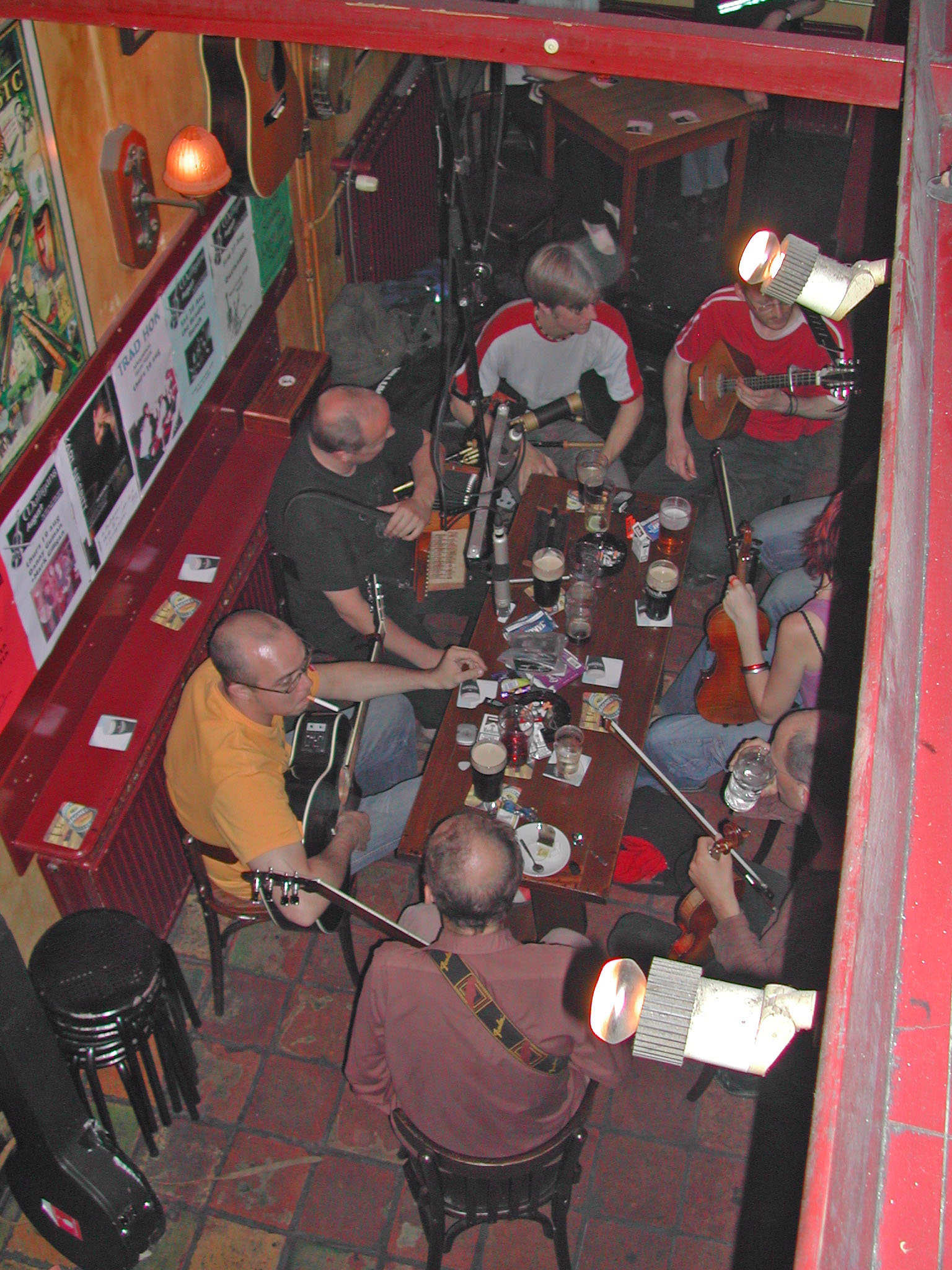
Irish music enthusiasts gather at a pub to play and drink beer

The general session scheme is that someone starts a tune, and those who know it join in. Good session etiquette requires not playing if one does not know the tune (or at least quietly playing an accompaniment part) and waiting until a tune one knows comes along. In an "open" session, anyone who is able to play Irish music is welcome. Most often there are more-or-less recognized session leaders; sometimes there are no leaders. At times a song will be sung or a slow air played by a single musician between sets.

== Locations and times ==
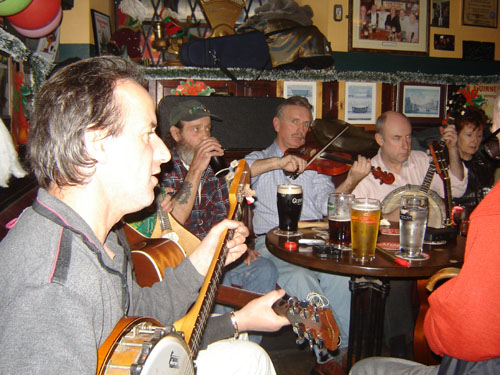
A Dublin pub session

Sessions are usually held in public houses or taverns. A pub owner might have one or two musicians paid to come regularly in order for the session to have a base. These musicians can perform during any gaps during the day or evening when no other performers are there and wish to play. Sunday afternoons and weekday nights (especially Tuesday and Wednesday) are common times for sessions to be scheduled, on the theory that these are the least likely times for dances and concerts to be held, and therefore the times that professional musicians will be most able to show up.

Sessions can be held in homes or at various public places in addition to pubs; often at a festival sessions will be got together in the beer tent or in the vendor's booth of a music-loving craftsperson or dealer. When a particularly large musical event "takes over" an entire village, spontaneous sessions may erupt on the street corners. Sessions may also take place occasionally at wakes. House sessions are not as common now as they were in the past. In her book Peig, Peig Sayers notes that when she was young they often attended sessions at people's houses, in a practice called 'bothántiocht'.

== See also ==
- List of All-Ireland Fleadh champions
- Irish traditional music
- Pub session
