= The Journeymen =

American folk music trio

- Origin: Greenwich Village, New York City
- Genres: Folk
- Years active: 1961–1964
- Label: Capitol
- Past members: John Phillips; Scott McKenzie; Dick Weissman

The Journeymen were an American folk music trio in the early 1960s, comprising John Phillips, Scott McKenzie, and Dick Weissman.

== Formation and career ==
John Phillips and Scott McKenzie (born Philip Blondheim) were childhood friends and had sung together in various groups, including the Abstracts and the Smoothies, during the 1950s. By early 1961, they were singing in clubs in Greenwich Village, New York City, alongside singer, songwriter, and banjo player Dick Weissman. As a trio, The Journeymen began performing together in Gerdes Folk City nightclub and soon won a five-month residency there. Their manager, Frank Werber, who also managed The Kingston Trio, won them a contract with Capitol Records, and they soon recorded their first self-titled LP, comprising traditional songs and two written by Phillips.

Phillips turned down Werber's suggestion that he join The Kingston Trio after Dave Guard left and continued to work with McKenzie and Weissman. The group's virtuosity in singing – with McKenzie usually taking the lead – performing, arranging and, increasingly, writing their own material, won them a following. They recorded their second album, Coming Attraction - Live!, at a show in Minneapolis. They also released several singles on Capitol. According to Bruce Eder at AllMusic, "the Journeymen engaged in piercing, topical humor, which gave their act an edge that was decidedly early '60s rather than late 1950s."

The group made the first recording of "500 Miles," a traditional song that was credited to Hedy West. They had some success with a single, "River Come Down", written by Phillips and Weissman, and continued to perform together in 1962, though the record company started to lose interest, and McKenzie increasingly suffered from mental health issues. The trio recorded a third album, New Directions In Folk Music, of which most of the songs were written by the group. However, McKenzie's problems worsened, and his friendship with Phillips deteriorated. In 1963, Phillips married Michelle Gilliam, and the group began to fall apart, a process exacerbated by the "British Invasion", which made their style of music less fashionable. The trio finally split up in early 1964.

== Later activities ==
For a time, Phillips then worked with his wife, Michelle, and banjoist Marshall Brickman as The New Journeymen. When Brickman accepted the head writer position on The Tonight Show Starring Johnny Carson and left the group, he was replaced by Denny Doherty. In 1965, John and Michelle Phillips, with Doherty and Cass Elliot, formed The Mamas and the Papas, to great success in the mid and late 1960s. John Phillips also wrote and co-produced McKenzie's 1967 global hit, "San Francisco (Be Sure to Wear Flowers in Your Hair)". Weissman continued to record, as a virtuoso banjoist, singer, songwriter, and musicologist.

John Phillips died in 2001, and Scott McKenzie in 2012.

== Discography ==
=== Albums ===
- The Journeymen (1961)
- Coming Attraction - Live! (1962)
- New Directions In Folk Music (1963)
- The Very Best of the Journeymen (compilation, 1988)
- Capitol Collectors Series: The Journeymen (compilation, 1992)

=== Singles ===
- "500 Miles" / "River Come Down" (1961)
- "Soft Blow The Summer Winds" / "Kumbaya" (1962)
- "Hush Now Sally" / "Don't Turn Around" (1962)
- "What'll I Do" / "Loadin' Coal" (1962)
- "Ja-Da" / "Kumbaya" (1963)
