= Dick Weissman =

American singer-songwriter

- Born: Richard Weissman; January 21, 1935 (age 91); Philadelphia, Pennsylvania, U.S.
- Genres: Folk
- Occupations: Singer; songwriter; musician; record producer; author/teacher
- Instruments: Vocals, banjo, guitar
- Years active: 1961-
- Label: Capitol Records
- Formerly of: The Journeymen

Richard Weissman (born January 21, 1935) is an American singer, composer, banjo player, author and teacher.

== Life and career ==
He was born in Philadelphia, and studied at Goddard College in Vermont. After learning to play banjo, he moved to New York City, where he co-founded The Journeymen with John Phillips and Scott McKenzie in 1961. The group recorded three albums and seven singles for Capitol Records before breaking up in 1964.

Weissman released a solo album The Things That Trouble My Mind for Capitol in 1964, before moving into a career as a studio musician, record producer and songwriter.

In 1972 Weissman moved to Colorado and began writing instructional books for banjo and guitar, which were published by Mel Bay. To date, he has written 15 published books on music and the music business and has written over fifty instructional folios for various music publishers. He later became a tenured professor in the Music & Entertainment Industry program at the University of Colorado at Denver.

In 1979, Weissman recorded a solo album on Kicking Mule Records, Modern Banjo - Mountain Style. As stated on the jacket, this was a great challenge for him. He dedicated the album to guitarist Sam Brown because he "thought that he (Sam) might have liked some of the music on this record" and because "Sam Brown (was) one of my favorite guitarists." Brown died shortly after the album was completed. According to Dick, "a victim of the music business, New York City, and his own frustrations."

Between 1994 and 2005, Weissman recorded three additional solo albums, for the Folk Era, Wind River and Long Bridge folk labels.

In 2016 Weissman's musical memoir The Music Never Stops: A Journey Into the Music of the Unknown, The Forgotten, The Rich & Famous was published.
