= Margot Mayo =

American dance instructor (1910–1974)

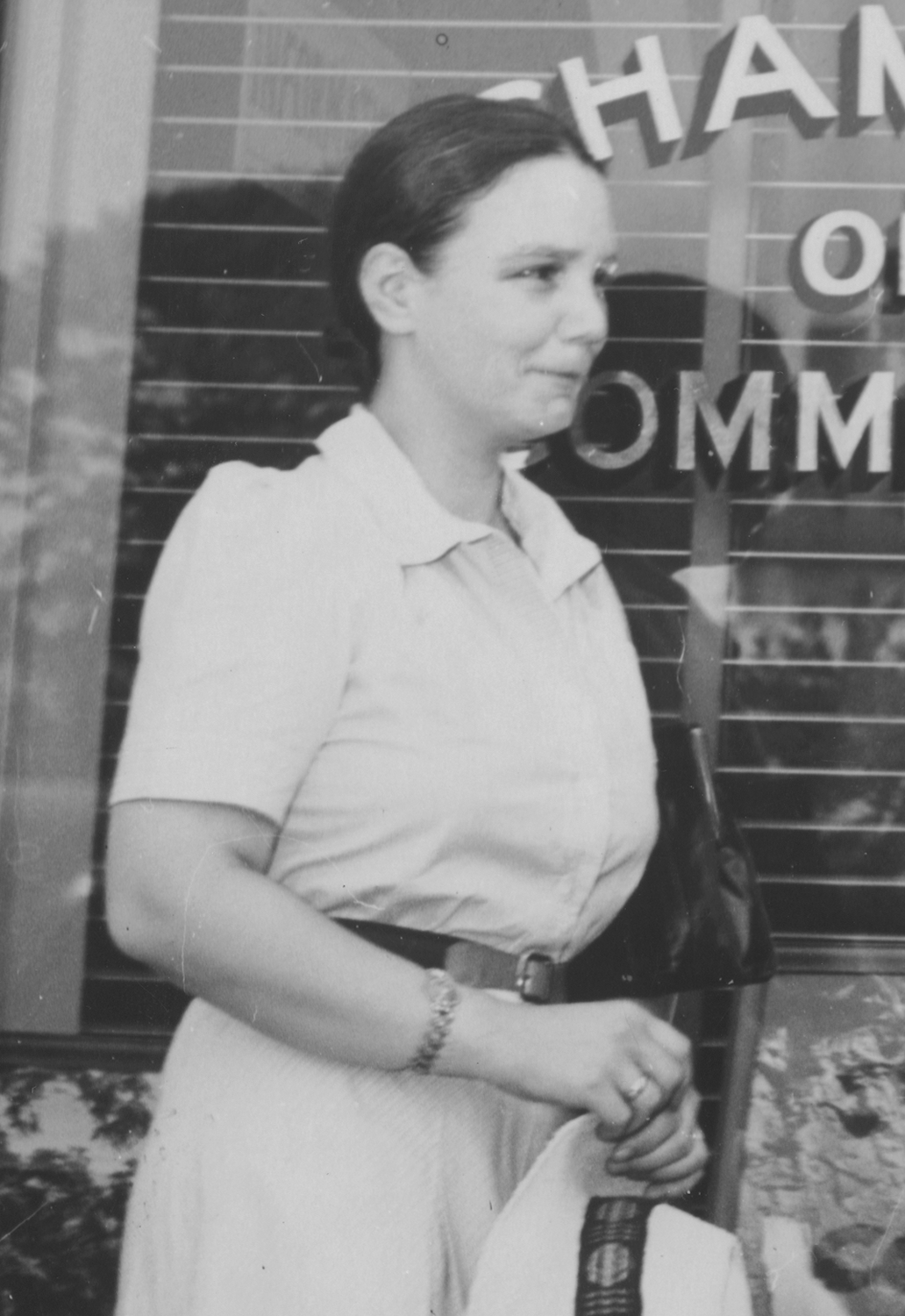
- Margot Mayo (between 1938 and 1950)
- Born: May 30, 1910; Commerce
- Died: May 1974 (aged 63–64); New York City
- Occupation: Dance teacher, collector of folk music
- Parent(s): William Leonidas Mayo

Margot Mayo (May 30, 1910 – May 1974) was an American dance instructor, educator, and collector of folk music.

== Early life ==
Margot Mayo was born Margaret Melba Mayo on May 30, 1910, in Commerce, Texas, the youngest of eight children of William Leonidas Mayo, the founding president of East Texas Normal College.

== Career ==
She was a key figure in the 1940s New York City revival of folk dancing and square dancing and American folk music. She was founder of the American Square Dance Group in 1934 and editor of its magazine, Promenade, and published the manual The American Square Dance in 1943. She and her American Square Dance Group perform on the 1947 Pete Seeger documentary To Hear Your Banjo Play.

The folk revival in New York City was rooted in the resurgent interest in square dancing and folk dancing there in the 1940s, which gave musicians such as Pete Seeger popular exposure.

Margot Mayo introduced Pete Seeger to his future wife, Toshi, who was in Mayo's square dance troupe. "They were a match since they met at a square dance in 1938."

Margot Mayo was also a teacher of music and dance at Woodward School, a progressive private elementary school in downtown Brooklyn. Among her students was Arlo Guthrie, who learned many of Woody Guthrie's songs at school, and was surprised that other people knew his father's songs better than he did.

== Personal life ==
Margo Mayo lived with her sister Gladys who was a piano teacher and piano faculty member at Juilliard School of Music from 1921 to 1950. They lived near Juilliard on Riverside Drive.

== Death ==
Margot Mayo died in May 1974 in New York City.

== Selected bibliography ==
- Mayo, Margot (1943). The American Square Dance. New York: Sentinel books.
