= Victor Maymudes =

Bob Dylan's tour manager (1935–2001)

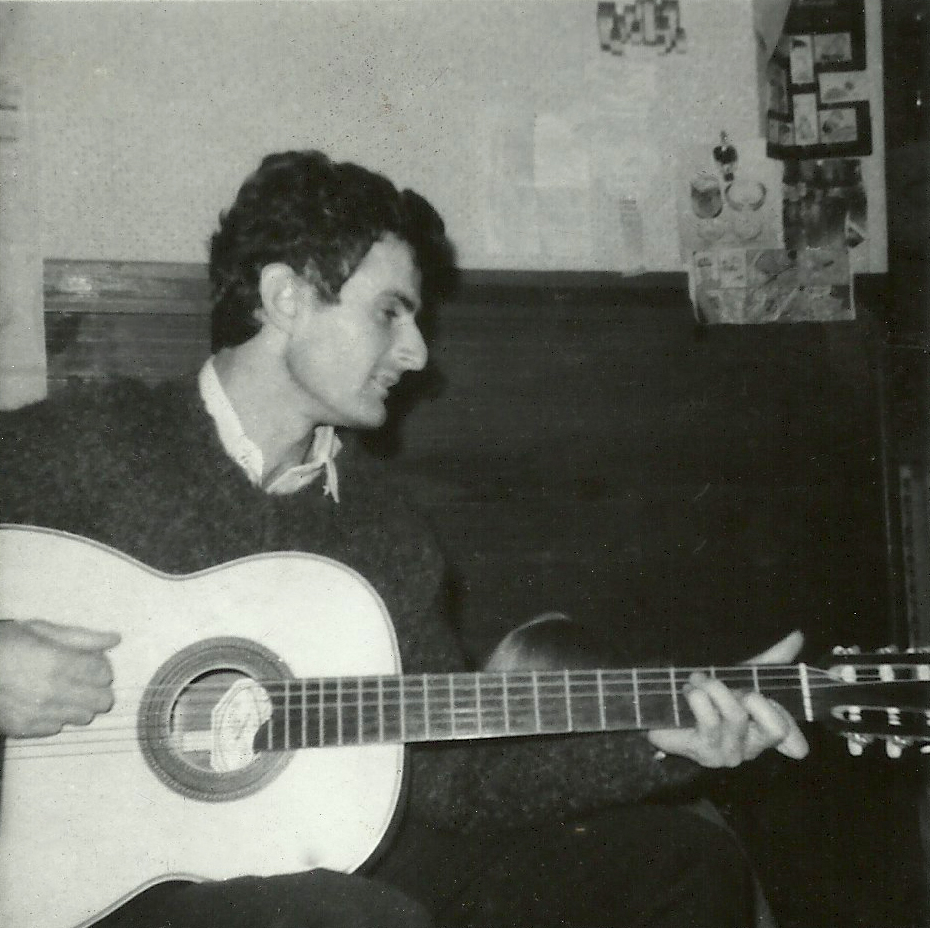
- Born: December 2, 1935; Los Angeles, California, U.S.
- Died: January 27, 2001 (aged 65); Santa Monica, California, U.S.
- Occupation: Tour manager

Victor Maymudes (December 2, 1935 – January 27, 2001) was Bob Dylan's tour manager at the beginning of his musical success in the early 1960s. After a hiatus in New Mexico, Maymudes rejoined Dylan as his tour manager from 1986 to 1996. After his death in 2001, Maymudes' son published a memoir based on hours of taped interviews.

== Biography ==
In his unfinished autobiography, posted on a website, Maymudes recalled opening the Unicorn coffee house in Los Angeles. The Unicorn (located on the Sunset Strip next to what would become the Whisky a Go Go) opened in 1957 by Maymudes and Herb Cohen (later well-known rock manager of Frank Zappa, Tim Buckley, and Tom Waits), was the first of its kind on the West Coast, south of San Francisco. "We had live music and poetry. People would read and play chess," he wrote.

In 1961, folk musician Ramblin' Jack Elliot introduced Maymudes to a Minnesota folk musician five years his junior who had just arrived in New York City's Greenwich Village. "We went to the Gaslight Cafe on MacDougal Street, where everyone hung out," Maymudes wrote. "When we came in, Bob Dylan was in the back room where the performers hung out. He had been typing on an old typewriter in the back room. He was a two-finger typer. He was writing a new song. This one would be a hard rain that was going to fall." Maymudes developed his own reputation in the annals of Dylanology. He was "tall, taciturn" with "penetrating dark eyes, turbulent hair and an uncanny ability to keep his mouth shut", wrote Robert Shelton in his 1986 biography of Dylan, No Direction Home. Photographs show Maymudes playing chess with Dylan and standing enigmatically beside him.

== Death ==
Maymudes died January 27, 2001, at UCLA Hospital in Santa Monica, California, a day after he was stricken with a cerebral aneurysm at his home in Pacific Palisades.
