= Baruch Werber =

Jewish author and publisher (1810–1876)

- Born: 1810; Brody, Galicia, Habsburg Empire
- Died: 31 July 1876 (aged 65–66); Brody, Galicia, Austrian Empire
- Children: Jacob Werber

Baruch Werber (Hebrew: ברוך ווערבער; 1810, Brody – 31 July 1876, Brody) was a Galician Jewish Hebraist, author, publisher, and editor.

Werber, who was a follower of Isaac Erter and Nachman Krochmal, began his literary career writing for the Hebrew weekly Ha-Mevasser. In 1865 he founded his own Hebrew weekly, which was published in Brody until 1890 under the names of Ha-Ivri (lit. 'The Hebrew') and Ivri Anokhi (lit. 'I Am a Hebrew'). In addition to numerous articles which appeared in this magazine, Werber wrote Megillat Kohelet (Lemberg, 1862; 2d ed., Warsaw, 1876), an introduction and commentary to Ecclesiastes, and Toledot Adam (Brody, 1870), a biography of Albert Cohn.

== Bibliography ==
- Megillat Kohelet. Lemberg: Hirsch Sperling & Berish Luria. 1862.
- Toledot Adam. Brody. 1870.
