= Jacob Werber =

Galician editor and writer (1859-1890)

- Born: 4 February 1859; Brody, Austrian Empire
- Died: 20 August 1890 (aged 31)
- Writing career
- Language: Hebrew
- Years active: 1874–1890

Jacob Werber (Hebrew: יעקב ווערבער, romanized: Ya'akov Verber; 4 February 1859 – 20 August 1890) was a Galician Jewish editor and writer.

== Biography ==
Jacob Werber was born in Brody, Galicia in 1859, the only son of Barukh Werber. His father was a Hebrew scholar who, from 1865, published the Hebrew-language weekly Ha-Ivri (known also as Ivri Anokhi; its title alternated for tax reasons). By age 15 Werber could read and speak Hebrew fluently, and in 1874 he published the novelette "Galgal ha-Ḥozer ba-Olam" in his father's periodical. He also wrote articles on natural science for Ha-Maggid (1875, 1876) and Ha-Tzfirah (1876).

Upon the death of his father in 1876, Werber became the editor of Ha-Ivri. He was a member of the Brody relief committee during the wave of pogroms in 1881–2. Werber contracted a severe illness in 1890 and died shortly thereafter, at the age of 31. Before his death he wrote his own obituary, which appeared in the last number of Ha-Ivri three days before his death.
