= Frank Werber =

American music producer and manager

Frank Nicholas Werber (March 27, 1929 – May 19, 2007) was a German-born American talent manager, restaurant owner and entrepreneur, who was particularly influential as the discoverer, manager and producer of The Kingston Trio in the late 1950s and early 1960s.

== Life and career ==
Werber was born in Cologne, Germany, but moved with his parents as a young child to escape the Nazi regime, first to the Netherlands and then Belgium. His mother died, and after the start of World War II he and his father were captured and interned in Vichy France. They managed to escape and fled to the African Continent and then to New York, arriving in 1941. They lived in Florida and then in Denver, Colorado, and after graduating Frank joined the US Navy. After visiting San Francisco on a tour of duty, he returned to live there in 1950 after his discharge.

Werber worked at a wide variety of jobs, including for some time as a photographer for United Press, but he became involved with the local nightclub scene and in the early 1950s became stage manager under Enrico Banducci at the hungry i nightclub. After four years working at the club and developing contacts in the entertainment business, Werber set up as an independent press agent. In early 1957 he saw Dave Guard and his informal group the Calypsonians perform at the Cracked Pot club in Redwood City and decided to work with them.

Changes in personnel left a trio of Guard, Nick Reynolds and Bob Shane, with Werber as their manager and effective fourth member. Werber improved the trio's stage presentation and helped expand its repertoire. The group grew in popularity in the Bay Area, which led to their signing a contract with Capitol Records, which in turn led to a succession of best-selling recordings. Werber closely managed their career and their investments until the Trio split up in 1967. As the Kingston Trio's manager, Werber is credited with designing the basic hospitality rider concerning the environment in which musicians perform and also with transforming "what had been the college lecture circuit and turned it into the college concert circuit".

Werber also managed other folk-oriented, jazz and rock groups including The Journeymen, We Five, The Sons of Champlin and The Mystery Trend. He set up Trident Productions, developed a recording studio in the Columbus Tower, and established a successful restaurant, The Trident, described as "a psychedelic health food restaurant with hanging plants and handmade candles where rock musicians hung out and ogled braless waitresses" in Sausalito. In 1967 he gave up his music business interests to concentrate on the restaurant and other investments. The following year federal agents raided his home and seized 258 pounds of marijuana, which he was accused of conspiring to transport. He was found not guilty but was then tried for possession and cultivation of marijuana, for which he was found guilty and served a short jail sentence.

In 1974 Werber started to give up most of his San Francisco business interests, moved for a time to Hawaii before retiring to a ranch in Silver City, New Mexico. He suffered a stroke several years before his death in 2007. He had married twice and had five children.
