= Eighth Step Coffee House =

The Eighth Step Coffee House was founded in Albany New York in 1967 by FOCUS CHURCHES, a coalition of local historic churches dedicated to street ministry without proselytizing, and for its first 30 years "The Step" had its office and coffeehouse in the basement of historic First Presbyterian Church at the corner of State and Willett Streets along Washington Park.

Located near Lark Street, a Center Square area popular with students from the University at Albany, College of Saint Rose and other colleges nearby, The Step attracted crowds of students and young adults from its opening night in 1967, and quickly evolved into an autonomous 501c3 nonprofit. Open seven days a week, it was run by a small staff and volunteer crew. Funding came from gate receipts (70% went to the night's performer), memberships and until 2000, FOCUS funding. At its peak in the 1970s, it boasted 2,000-3,000 members.

By 1985, smaller concerts (100 people) and the weekly Open Mike - the region's largest - were held in the basement coffeehouse. Larger (400+) concerts were presented upstairs on the church Assembly Hall's wooden stage, a space dubbed by The Step "8th Step Upstairs" and featuring two Tiffany Windows, one a commemorative window for Joseph Henry.

The Eighth Step also introduced contradancing to the Capital Region, the brainchild of traditional musician Bill Spenceh while working with The Step. This traditional form of New England line dancing exploded in popularity around the region, with several organizations coordinating their own monthly series to provide packed weekly dances with live music on every weekend. The annual 3-day Old Songs Festival, directed by Andy Spence (married to Bill), featured a high-energy dance area that ran into the wee hours of every festival night.

Meanwhile, The Eighth Step presented the finest musicians of national, international, regional, local, and sometimes no repute. It found its niche in presenting contemporary singer-songwriters, but also Celtic, jazz, bluegrass, folk rock, comedy, folk dance performance and classes, and theatre including popular improv sessions. The Step provided space for North River Friends of Clearwater, the Irish music sessions Comheoltis, Pick'n & Sing'n Gathering'.

"The Step" eventually outgrew its original home, and in 2000 took over historic Cohoes Music Hall at the invitation of the new Cohoes mayor. In 2003, after three successful seasons, it left Cohoes and became what one regional arts writer dubbed "a traveling feast," presenting concerts on many regional stages: RPI, Proctors, Steamer 10, Schenectady Civic Theatre, University at Albany's Page and Chancellors Halls, and more. In 2007 it accepted a residency at Proctor's Theatre in Schenectady, New York, where it remains.

Since 1987 The Step has been run by Margie Rosenkranz, Executive Artistic Director. Writer, editor, organizer and publicist, her experience includes Director of Marketing (the first) for The Egg; Senior Writer for Skidmore College; Publicist then Artistic Director - at Toshi Seeger's request - for Clearwater Revival; and publicist for Clearwater's annual Pumpkin Sail. Sloop Clearwater is a working, life-sized reproduction of 18th century transport vessels that carried Upstate cargo and passengers to New York City. Pete & Toshi Seeger were the driving forces behind the construction of the sloop, which is still dedicated to public awareness, education and celebration of the Hudson River.

The Eighth Step has introduced scores of singer-songwriters to the region, including John Gorka, Patty Larkin, Greg Brown, Phil Ochs Song Night, Cheryl Wheeler, The Wailin' Jennies, Dougie MacLean, Susan Werner, Bucky & John Pizzarelli, Kim & Reggie Harris, Magpie, Lost in the Trees, Pat Humphries, Dar Williams, The Grand Slambovians, Joe Jencks, Canadian blues/Celtic guitar virtuoso JP Cormier, Kate Campbell, and many, many more.

Since 1967, known and unknown artists with whom The Step has worked have included Pete Seeger, Richie Havens, Tom Paxton, U Utah Phillips, Ronnie Gilbert, Greg Brown, Scotland's Dougie MacLean, Holly Near, Sheila Jordan, Buffy Sainte-Marie, queen of scat Sheila Jordan, Richie Havens, Peter Ostroushko, Guy Davis, Arlo Guthrie, Bucky & John Pizzarelli, Alison Krauss, Lunasa, The Del McCoury Band, John McCutcheon, Gangstagrass, Odetta, independent rock phenomenon Ani DiFranco. Unknown, DiFranco first performed to 40 people in the coffeehouse; the following year she drew 400 at 8th Step Upstairs. The following year Rosenkranz and The Step presented her at Albany's Palace Theatre to over 2,600 people.

At Proctor's, The Step now most often uses Proctors GE Theatre (430 seats), or The Addy (90 seats). One of Pete Seeger's final large concerts, performed with his sister Peggy, sold all 2,600 seats at the Mainstage. The 8th Step seasons currently take place from September to May. Tickets are available through their website or the Proctors Box Office. The establishment offers a variety of desserts and beverages. Coffee is available for one dollar, and the live music is regularly featured, continuing the tradition of the coffeehouse.
