= Back in Town (The Kingston Trio album) =

Live album by The Kingston Trio
- Released: June 1964
- Recorded: March 23–31, 1964
- Venue: The hungry i, San Francisco, California
- Genre: Folk
- Label: Capitol
- Producer: Voyle Gilmore

The Kingston Trio chronology
Time to Think (1963)	Back in Town (1964)	The Kingston Trio (Nick Bob John) (1964)

Professional ratings
Review scores
Source	Rating
Record Mirror	3/5 stars

Back in Town is a live album by the American folk music group the Kingston Trio, released in 1964. It reached number 22 on the Billboard Pop Albums chart and is the final principal album recorded by the Trio for Capitol Records. The Trio's seven-year contract with Capitol ended in February 1964 with one album due. Unable to negotiate another contract, the group released this live album and moved to Decca Records.

== Reissues ==
- Back in Town was reissued along with Something Special on CD by Collectors Choice Records in 2000. A bonus track, "C'mon Betty Home", which was written by Noel Paul Stookey and Peter Yarrow from Peter, Paul and Mary is included.
- In 2000, all of the tracks from Back in Town were included in The Stewart Years 10-CD box set issued by Bear Family Records.

== Track listing ==
=== Side one ===
1. "Georgia Stockade" (Reynolds, Shane, J Stewart) – 2:33
2. "Ann" (Billy Edd Wheeler) – 2:39
3. "Ah Woe, Ah Me" (Reynolds, Shane, J Stewart) – 2:27
4. "Walkin' This Road to My Town" (Al Shackman) – 2:37
5. "The World I Used to Know" (Rod McKuen) – 2:49
6. "Salty Dog" (Traditional, Reynolds, Shane, J Stewart) – 2:22

=== Side two ===
1. "Let's Get Together" (Chet Powers) – 2:46
2. "Isle in the Water" (McKuen) – 2:58
3. "Farewell Captain" (Mike Stewart) - 2:40
4. "Tom Dooley" (Alan Lomax, Frank Warner) – 3:17
5. "Them Poems" (Mason Williams) – 2:03
6. "So Hi" (Reynolds, Shane, J Stewart) – 2:09

== Personnel ==
- Bob Shane – vocals, guitar
- Nick Reynolds – vocals, tenor guitar, conga
- John Stewart – vocals, banjo, guitar
- Dean Reilly – bass
- Glen Campbell – guitar

== Production notes ==
- Voyle Gilmore – producer
- Pete Abbott – engineer
- Ken Veeder – cover photo

== Chart positions ==
Year	Chart	Position
1964	Billboard Pop Albums	22
