= College Concert =

Live album by The Kingston Trio
- Released: February 1962
- Recorded: December 6–7, 1961
- Venue: Student Union Building, University of California, Los Angeles
- Genre: Folk
- Label: Capitol
- Producer: Voyle Gilmore

The Kingston Trio chronology
Close-Up (1961)	College Concert (1962)	Something Special (1962)

Singles from College Concert
- 1. "O Ken Karanga"/"Where Have All the Flowers Gone?" Released: December 18, 1961; 2. "Chilly Winds"/"Roddy McCorley" Released: 1962 (UK)

College Concert is the twelfth album by the American folk music group the Kingston Trio, released in 1962 (see 1962 in music). It was the group's third live release and the first live release with new member John Stewart. College Concert peaked at number three on the Billboard charts and was the largest-selling release by the Stewart-years Trio.

== History ==
The Trio recorded the single version of "Where Have All the Flowers Gone?" in a New York studio November 14, 1961 and claimed authorship, but they took their names off when Pete Seeger asked them to. The single, with "O Ken Karanga" as the A-side and "Where Have All the Flowers Gone?" the B-side, reached #21 in the 1962 charts, as shown in the Billboard Hot 100. A single with "Chilly Winds" b/w "Roddy McCorley" was released in the UK. An additional single was released in the US in April consisting of "Scotch and Soda" b/w "Jane Jane Jane".

Producer Voyle Gilmore and engineer Pete Abbott recorded two performances at the University of California, Los Angeles and edited the best performances from each night. College Concert was the last performance with the Trio by long-time bassist David "Buck" Wheat.

The original liner notes are attributed to the Trio's opening act Ronnie Schell as "America's Slowest Rising Young Comedian".

== Reception ==
Professional ratings
Review scores
Source	Rating
Allmusic	4.5/5 stars

Allmusic music critic Bruce Eder, while criticizing the thin bass sound, praised the album as "One of the best-selling LPs ever recorded by the Kingston Trio, College Concert is also the album by the trio that holds up best in the decades since... the overall quality of the performance, from the exquisitely arranged "500 Miles" to the rousing version of "Young Roddy M'Corley," was the album's most alluring overall feature."

== Reissues ==
- College Concert was reissued along with Close-Up on CD by Collectors' Choice Music in 1999.
- In 2000, all of the tracks from College Concert were included in The Stewart Years 10-CD box set issued by Bear Family Records.

== Track listing ==
=== Side one ===
1. "This Little Light" (Arranged by Reynolds, Shane, Stewart)
2. "Coplas Revisited" (Arranged by Reynolds, Shane, Stewart)
3. "Chilly Winds" (John Phillips, John Stewart)
4. "Oh, Miss Mary" (Phillips, Stewart)
5. "Laredo?" (Arranged by Reynolds, Shane, Stewart)
6. "O Ken Karanga" (Maurice Baron, Lionel Belasco, Massie Patterson)

=== Side two ===
1. "Roddy McCorley" (Traditional)
2. "M.T.A." (Bess Lomax Hawes, Jacqueline Steiner)
3. "500 Miles" (Hedy West)
4. "The Ballad of the Shape of Things" (Sheldon Harnick)
5. "Where Have All the Flowers Gone?" (Pete Seeger, Joe Hickerson)
6. "Goin' Away for to Leave You" (Phillips)

== Personnel ==
- Bob Shane – vocals, guitar
- Nick Reynolds – vocals, tenor guitar, conga, BooBams
- John Stewart – vocals, banjo, guitar
- David "Buck" Wheat – bass

== Production notes ==
- Voyle Gilmore – producer
- Pete Abbott – engineer
- Ken Veeder – cover photo

== Chart positions ==
Year	Chart	Position
1962	Billboard Pop Albums	3
