= Close-Up (The Kingston Trio album) =

Studio album by The Kingston Trio
- Released: October 1961
- Recorded: August 1961
- Studio: Capitol Studio B (Hollywood)
- Genre: Folk
- Label: Capitol
- Producer: Voyle Gilmore

The Kingston Trio chronology
Goin' Places (1961)	Close-Up (1961)	College Concert (1962)

Singles from Close-Up
- 1. "Coming from the Mountains"/"Nothing More to Look Forward To" Released: 1961

Close-Up is the eleventh album by the American folk music group the Kingston Trio, released in 1961 (see 1961 in music). (The Capitol Years gives the release date as September.) It was the first release by the group after the departure of founding member Dave Guard. The Trio now consisted of Bob Shane, Nick Reynolds and Guard's replacement John Stewart. Close-Up peaked at number three on the Billboard charts. The lead-off single was "Coming from the Mountains" backed with a non-LP track, "Nothing More to Look Forward To". Close-Up was nominated for a Grammy Award in 1961 for Best Performance by a Vocal Group.

== History ==
After the departure of Guard, a replacement was sought by the remaining group members and their manager Frank Werber. Stewart, previously a member of The Cumberland Three, had written two songs recorded by the Guard-era Trio ("Molly Dee" and "Green Grasses") and was also a long-time fan of the group. He was hired and began his career with the group prior to the recording of Close-Up in August 1961. After the departure of Guard, the Kingston Trio name was owned by Shane, Reynolds, and Werber. Stewart was never a full-fledged partner in the Kingston Trio, but instead was on a salary ($500/week) his entire tenure. There was no mention on the packaging that Stewart was a new member of the group.

As was common at the time of release and as the Trio had done on all of their previous releases, the group members again claimed authorship on Close-Up for six songs that were in the Public Domain.

== Reception ==
Professional ratings
Review scores
Source	Rating
Allmusic	4.5/5 stars

Allmusic music critic Bruce Eder praised the album, writing: "the album showed the trio to be in solid musical shape, harmonizing beautifully, and with a new songwriting talent in their midst in the guise of Stewart, whose haunting, slightly bluesy ballad "When My Love Was Here" was the highlight of the record. Close Up, although not as groundbreaking as the trio's self-titled debut three years earlier, showed a surprisingly undiminished group and is a good representation of where popular folk music was in late 1961... this melodic and aesthetically pleasing album was perfect for its time and still evokes that relatively innocent and calm period in our past."

Close-Up was nominated for a Grammy Award in 1961 for Best Performance by a Vocal Group.

== Reissues ==
- Close-Up was reissued along with College Concert on CD by Collectors' Choice Music in 1999.
- In 2000, all of the tracks from Close-Up were included in The Stewart Years 10-CD box set issued by Bear Family Records.

== Track listing ==
Some early copies of the album named five of the songs differently on the dust jacket from the LP's label. "Coming From the Mountains" on the jacket was "Wherever We May Go" on the LP, "The Whistling Gypsy" became "The Gypsy Rover", "Oh, Sail Away" was shortened to "Sail Away", "Glorious Kingdom" was "Oh Baby Boy", and "Weeping Willow" became "Beneath the Willows".

=== Side one ===
1. "Coming from the Mountains" (John Stewart)
2. "Oh, Sail Away" (John Phillips, Dick Weisman)
3. "Take Her Out of Pity" (Arranged by Reynolds, Shane, Stewart)
4. "Don't You Weep, Mary" (Arranged by Reynolds, Shane, Stewart)
5. "The Whistling Gypsy" (Leo Maguire)
6. "O Ken Karanga" (Maurice Baron, Lionel Belasco, Massie Patterson)

=== Side two ===
1. "Jesse James" (Arranged by Reynolds, Shane, Stewart)
2. "Glorious Kingdom" (Arranged by Reynolds, Shane, Stewart)
3. "When My Love Was Here" (Stewart)
4. "Karu" (Arranged by Reynolds, Shane, Stewart)
5. "Weeping Willow" (Arranged by Reynolds, Shane, Stewart)
6. "Reuben James" (Woody Guthrie)

== Personnel ==
- Bob Shane – vocals, guitar
- Nick Reynolds – vocals, tenor guitar, BooBams, conga
- John Stewart – vocals, banjo, guitar
- David "Buck" Wheat – bass

== Production notes ==
- Voyle Gilmore – producer
- Pete Abbott – engineer
- Ken Veeder – cover photo

== Chart positions ==
Year	Chart	Position
1961	Billboard Pop Albums	3
