= Time to Think (The Kingston Trio album) =

Studio album by The Kingston Trio
- Released: December 1963
- Recorded: 1963 in San Francisco, California
- Genre: Folk
- Label: Capitol
- Producer: Voyle Gilmore

The Kingston Trio chronology
Sunny Side! (1963)	Time to Think (1963)	Back in Town (1964)

Singles from Time to Think
- 1. "Ally Ally Oxen Free"/"Marcelle Vahine" Released: 1963; 2. "Last Night I Had the Strangest Dream"/"The Patriot Game" Released: 1964; 3. "Seasons in the Sun"/"If You Don't Look Around" Released: 1964

Time to Think is an album by the American folk music group the Kingston Trio, released in 1963 (see 1963 in music). It reached number 18 on the Billboard Pop Albums chart, only the third of the Trio's fifteen albums released since 1958 not to reach the top ten. The lead-off single was "Ally Ally Oxen Free" b/w "Marcelle Vahine", released in November 1963. Two more singles were released from the album in 1964 — "Last Night I Had the Strangest Dream" b/w "The Patriot Game" and "Seasons in the Sun" b/w "If You Don't Look Around", the latter the final single the trio released on the Capitol label.

== History ==
Time to Think appeared at a time when the folk music genre in the United States was changing. More socially conscious material was being released from Bob Dylan; Peter, Paul and Mary; and others. Although the album spent 21 weeks on the charts, The Kingston Trio attempted to keep up with the times, only to continue to see their sales and popularity decline.

== Reception ==
Professional ratings
Review scores
Source	Rating
Allmusic	4.5/5 stars

Allmusic critic Bruce Eder called the album the trio's "attempt to compete in the new era of topical folk songs... The group's sound works even in this setting, though their approaches to some of the songs do seem odd together."

== Reissues ==
- Time to Think was reissued along with New Frontier on CD by Collectors Choice Records in 2000. The reissue includes both versions of "Greenback Dollar" – the album track and the single with the word "damn" edited out.
- In 2000, all of the tracks from Time to Think were included in The Stewart Years 10-CD box set issued by Bear Family Records.

== Track listing ==
=== Side one ===
1. "Patriot Game" (Dominic Behan) – 2:50
2. "Coal Tattoo" (Billy Edd Wheeler) – 2:32
3. "Hobo's Lullaby" (Goebel Reeves) – 3:08
4. "Seasons in the Sun" (Rod McKuen, Jacques Brel) – 2:27
5. "These Seven Men" (John Stewart) – 2:27
6. "Ally Ally Oxen Free" (McKuen, Sammy Yates) – 2:02

=== Side two ===
1. "Deportee (Plane Wreck at Los Gatos)" (Woody Guthrie, Martin Hoffman) – 3:32
2. "No One to Talk My Troubles To" (Dick Weissman) – 2:25
3. "If You Don't Look Around" (Stewart) – 2:50
4. "Turn Around" (Harry Belafonte, Alan Greene, Nick Reynolds) – 2:38
5. "Song for a Friend" (Stewart) – 2:35
6. "Last Night I Had the Strangest Dream" (Ed McCurdy) – 2:08

== Personnel ==
- Bob Shane – vocals, guitar
- Nick Reynolds – vocals, tenor guitar
- John Stewart – vocals, banjo, guitar
- Dean Reilly – bass
- John Staubard – guitar

other session players rumored Glen Campbell and Dick Rossmini

== Production notes ==
- Voyle Gilmore – producer

== Chart positions ==
Year	Chart	Position
1964	Billboard Pop Albums	18
