= The Kingston Trio No. 16 =

The Kingston Trio #16

Studio album by The Kingston Trio
- Released: March 1963
- Genre: Folk
- Length: 30:32
- Label: Capitol
- Producer: Voyle Gilmore

The Kingston Trio chronology
New Frontier (1962)	The Kingston Trio #16 (1963)	Sunny Side! (1963)

Singles from The Kingston Trio #16
- 1. "Reverend Mr. Black" Released: April 8, 1963

The Kingston Trio #16 is an album by the American folk music group the Kingston Trio, released in 1963 (see 1963 in music). It reached number 4 on the Billboard Pop Albums chart. The lead-off single was "Reverend Mr. Black" b/w "One More Round", reaching number 8.

== Reception ==
Professional ratings
Review scores
Source	Rating
Allmusic	3/5 stars

Allmusic critic Bruce Eder called the album "an engaging collection of John Stewart originals interspersed with a handful of joint compositions and arrangements and two outside numbers. Whatever the makeup of the songwriting, the album is one of the trio's best, a sinewy, exciting collection of performances... This was the trio's last great album for Capitol Records."

== Reissues ==
- The Kingston Trio #16 was reissued along with Sunny Side! on CD by Collectors Choice Records in 2000.
- In 2000, all of the tracks from The Kingston Trio #16 were included in The Stewart Years 10-CD box set issued by Bear Family Records.

== Track listing ==
=== Side one ===
1. "The Reverend Mr. Black" (Jerry Leiber, Mike Stoller, Billy Edd Wheeler)
2. "Road to Freedom" (John Stewart)
3. "River Run Down" (Stewart, Don MacArthur)
4. "Big Ball in Town" (Traditional)
5. "One More Round" (Nick Reynolds, Bob Shane, Stewart)
6. "Old Joe Hannah" (Traditional)

=== Side two ===
1. "Run the Ridges" (Stewart)
2. "Try to Remember" (Tom Jones, Harvey Schmidt)
3. "Mark Twain" (Harvey Geller, Martin Seligson)
4. "Low Bridge" (Reynolds, Shane, Stewart)
5. "Ballad of the Quiet Fighter" (Stewart)
6. "La Bamba" (Traditional)

== Personnel ==
- Bob Shane – vocals, guitar
- Nick Reynolds – vocals, tenor guitar, bongos, conga
- John Stewart – vocals, banjo, guitar
- Dean Reilly – bass
- Glen Campbell – banjo

== Production notes ==
- Voyle Gilmore – producer

== Chart positions ==
Year	Chart	Position
1963	Billboard Pop Albums	4
