= Sunny Side! =

Studio album by The Kingston Trio
- Released: July 1963
- Recorded: 1963
- Genre: Folk
- Length: 27:46
- Label: Capitol
- Producer: Voyle Gilmore

The Kingston Trio chronology
The Kingston Trio #16 (1963)	Sunny Side! (1963)	Time to Think (1963)

Singles from Sunny Side!
- 1. "Desert Pete" Released: July 15, 1963

Sunny Side! is an album by the American folk music group the Kingston Trio, released in 1963 (see 1963 in music). It reached number 7 on the Billboard Pop Albums chart. The lead-off single was "Desert Pete" b/w "Ballad of the Thresher". The single was the last Top 40 single for the group. Members of the Western Writers of America chose it as one of the Top 100 Western songs of all time.

Preview copies of the album that were sent to radio stations and music critics contained the track "Woody's Song." Negative feedback led to Capitol removing it from the album. "Woody's Song" appeared on "Rediscover," a rarities album released by Folk Era Records in 1985, under the title of "Folksinger's Song."

== Reception ==
Professional ratings
Review scores
Source	Rating
Allmusic	2/5 stars

Allmusic critic Bruce Eder thought the album was a "rushed recording" due to the success of "Reverend Mr. Black". He wrote: "The major problem with the album is that too many of the songs here sound like they're stuck at (or shouldn't have gotten past) the demo stage"

== Reissues ==
- Sunny Side! was reissued along with The Kingston Trio #16 on CD by Collectors Choice Records in 2000.
- In 2000, all of the tracks from Sunny Side!, including the deleted "Woody's Song," were included in The Stewart Years 10-CD box set issued by Bear Family Records.

== Track listing ==
=== Side one ===
1. "Desert Pete" (Billy Edd Wheeler)
2. "Marcelle Vahine" (Augie Goupil)
3. "Sing Out" (Michael Stewart)
4. "Ballad of the Thresher" (Nat Allen, Keith Donald, Alice Nielsen)
5. "Blowin' in the Wind" (Bob Dylan)
6. "Goo Ga Gee" (Mike Settle)

=== Side two ===
1. "Jackson" (Wheeler, Jerry Leiber)
2. "Two-Ten, Six-Eighteen (Doesn't Anybody Know My Name)" (Rod McKuen)
3. "Those Brown Eyes" (Woody Guthrie, Alan Arkin, Bill Carey, Erik Darling)
4. "Those Who Are Wise" (John Stewart)
5. "Rider" (Nick Reynolds, Bob Shane, Judy Henske)

== Personnel ==
- Bob Shane – vocals, guitar
- Nick Reynolds – vocals, tenor guitar, bongos, conga
- John Stewart – vocals, banjo,
- Glen Campbell - 6 string banjo on "Desert Pete", 12 string guitar
- Dean Reilly – bass
- Sue Ellen Davies - backing vocals on “Desert Pete” (Beverly Bivens of We Five was not on Desert Pete, but she replaced Sue Ellen Davies in The Ridgerunners which became We Five in 1965)

== Production notes ==
- Voyle Gilmore – producer

== Chart positions ==
Year	Chart	Position
1963	Billboard Pop Albums	7
