= Somethin' Else (The Kingston Trio album) =

Studio album by The Kingston Trio
- Released: November 1965
- Recorded: 1965
- Studio: Columbus Recording Studio, San Francisco, California
- Genre: Folk
- Label: Decca

The Kingston Trio chronology
| Stay Awhile (1965) | Somethin' Else (1965) | Children of the Morning (1966) |

Singles from Somethin' Else
- 1. "Parchment Farm Blues"/"Runaway Song" Released: 1965

Somethin' Else is an album by the American folk music group the Kingston Trio, released in 1965 (see 1965 in music). It was the first Kingston Trio principal album to miss the charts completely. The lead-off single was "Parchment Farm" b/w "Runaway Song".

== Background ==
The liner notes mention the "amazing new sound" of the Kingston Trio, referring to the use of a backing band on this release. The trio's arrangement of Bukka White's "Parchman Farm" (here called "Parchment Farm Blues") is based on Mose Allison's version.

== Reception ==
Professional ratings
Review scores
| Source | Rating |
|---|---|
| Allmusic | 3/5 stars |
| Record Mirror | 3/5 stars |

In his Allmusic review, music critic Bruce Eder compared the Trio's sound to the folk-rock acts taking over the airwaves. He wrote of the album "Not wishing to be left behind, the Kingston Trio decided to go the same route on their third Decca album, Somethin' Else. The result was an awkward but sometimes quite beautiful hybrid... On the other hand, there were sides that didn't sound much like the Kingston Trio at all, most notably "Parchment Farm Blues" (which, astonishingly, became the single off the album), with its up-front percussion and organ-dominated accompaniment, which came off like the work of some L.A. garage band parodying the Kingston Trio."

== Reissues ==
- Somethin' Else has not been reissued on CD. Eight of the tracks were reissued as bonus tracks on Stay Awhile and Children of the Morning by the Folk Era label.
- In 2000, all of the tracks from Somethin' Else were included in The Stewart Years 10-CD box set issued by Bear Family Records.
- All but four of the tracks from Somethin' Else were reissued on CD in 2002 by Folk Era along with the rest of their Decca releases on The Decca Years.

== Track listing ==
"Jack Splittard" is an alias for Bob Shane, Nick Reynolds, and John Stewart.

=== Side one ===
1. "Parchment Farm Blues" (Arranged by Jack Splittard, Randy Cierley) – 2:16
2. "Early Morning Rain" (Gordon Lightfoot) – 2:33
3. "Where Are You Going Little Boy?" (John Stewart) – 2:19
4. "Interchangeable Love (We Love Us)" (Mason Williams) – 0:47
5. "Last Thing on My Mind" (Tom Paxton) – 3:01
6. "Go Tell Roger" (Stewart, Cierley) – 1:45

=== Side two ===
1. "Red River Shore" (Arranged by Splittard, Cierley) – 2:27
2. "Verandah of Millium August" (Stewart, Cierley) – 2:29
3. "They Are Gone" (Williams) – 2:42
4. "Long Time Blues" (Williams) – 2:15
5. "Dancing Distance" (Stewart, Williams) – 2:45
6. "Runaway Song" (Stewart) – 2:00

== Personnel ==
- Bob Shane – vocals, guitar
- Nick Reynolds – vocals, tenor guitar
- John Stewart – vocals, banjo, guitar
- Dean Reilly – bass
- David "Buck" Wheat – guitar
- Randy Stierling (Cierley) – guitar, 12-string guitar
- Jerry Granelli – drums
- Rex Larson – bass
- John Chambers – drums
- Andrew Belling – organ
- Don Graham – sandwiches and milk shakes
