= The Kingston Trio (Nick Bob John) =

Studio album by The Kingston Trio
- Released: December 7, 1964
- Recorded: 1964
- Genre: Folk
- Length: 38:03 (reissue)
- Label: Decca
- Producer: Frank Werber

The Kingston Trio chronology
Back in Town (1963)	The Kingston Trio (Nick Bob John) (1964)	Stay Awhile (1965)

Singles from The Kingston Trio
- 1. "My Ramblin' Boy"/"Hope You Understand" Released: 1964; 2. "I'm Going Home"/"Little Play Soldiers" Released: 1964

The Kingston Trio (Nick Bob John) (more commonly known as Nick Bob John) is an album by the American folk music group the Kingston Trio, released in 1964 (see 1964 in music). Nick Bob John failed to reach the Top 40, peaking at number 53 on the Billboard Pop Albums chart.

== History ==
The Kingston Trio (Nick Bob John) was the trio's first release on the Decca label after seven years, 19 albums and worldwide record sales in the tens of millions (three million on "Tom Dooley" alone) with Capitol Records. The names are those of the Trio's members, Nick Reynolds, Bob Shane, and John Stewart.

Two singles were released: "My Ramblin' Boy" b/w "Hope You Understand" and "I'm Going Home" b/w "Little Play Soldiers". Neither single, and notably none of the Decca singles, reached the Top 100 in the charts.

The album was produced by Frank Werber, the Trio's manager since its inception.

"I'm Going Home", by Fred Geis, remained a concert favorite of the Trio's in this and future incarnations of the group, sometimes re-titled "California". Geis was the subject of a lawsuit over the melody, alleged to resemble music from the Broadway musical Milk and Honey by Jerry Herman.

== Reception ==
Professional ratings
Review scores
Source	Rating
Allmusic	4.5/5 stars
Record Mirror	3/5 stars

In his Allmusic review, music critic Bruce Eder called the album "one of the strongest albums of the group's entire history, containing an embarrassment of riches among its original dozen songs. And it's also a surprisingly contemporary record for a group that was supposedly long past its prime in 1965..." but noted the sound quality was "a little flat-sounding compared with the group's prior work at Capitol's studios..."

== Reissues ==
- Nick Bob John was reissued on a remastered CD in 1991 along with two bonus tracks on the Folk Era label.
- In 2000, all of the tracks from Nick Bob John were included in The Stewart Years 10-CD box set issued by Bear Family Records.
- Nick Bob John was reissued on CD in 2002 by Folk Era along with the rest of their Decca releases on The Decca Years.

== Track listing ==
=== Side one ===
1. "Midnight Special" (Lead Belly) – 2:07
2. "Love's Been Good to Me" (Rod McKuen) – 3:05
3. "Poverty Hill" (Fred Hellerman, Fran Minkoff) – 3:22
4. "Someday Soon" (Ian Tyson) – 2:49
5. "Gotta Travel On" (Paul Clayton, Larry Ehrlich, Ronnie Gilbert, Lee Hays, Fred Hellerman, Dave Lazar, Pete Seeger) – 3:18
6. "Hope You Understand" (John Stewart) – 2:20

=== Side two ===
1. "Little Play Soldiers" (Martin Cooper) – 2:20
2. "Love Comes a Trickling Down" (Jonathan Harris) – 2:53
3. "My Ramblin' Boy" (Tom Paxton) – 3:42
4. "More Poems" (Mason Williams) – 1:42
5. "Farewell (Fare Thee Well)" (Bob Dylan) – 3:16
6. "I'm Going Home" (Fred Geis) – 2:22
  1991 reissue bonus tracks:
7. "Long Time Blues" (Williams) – 2:21
8. "Come Gather the Time" (Stewart) – 2:26

== Personnel ==
- Bob Shane – vocals, guitar
- Nick Reynolds – vocals, tenor guitar
- John Stewart – vocals, banjo, guitar
- Dean Reilly – bass

== Production notes ==
- Frank Werber – producer
- Bob Norberg – engineer

== Chart positions ==
Year	Chart	Position
1965	Billboard Pop Albums	53
