= New Frontier (album) =

Studio album by The Kingston Trio
- Released: November 1962
- Recorded: 1962
- Studio: Capitol Studios, Los Angeles, California
- Genre: Folk
- Label: Capitol
- Producer: Voyle Gilmore

The Kingston Trio chronology
Something Special (1962)	New Frontier (1962)	The Kingston Trio #16 (1963)

Singles from New Frontier
- 1. "Greenback Dollar"/"New Frontier" Released: 1962

New Frontier is an album by the American folk music group the Kingston Trio, their third album released in 1962 (see 1962 in music). It reached number 16 on the Billboard Pop Albums chart. The lead-off single was "Greenback Dollar" b/w "New Frontier".

== Reception ==
Professional ratings
Review scores
Source	Rating
AllMusic	3/5 stars
New Record Mirror	4/5 stars

Allmusic critic Bruce Eder contrasts the release of New Frontier and its optimism with the more political and topical material of Bob Dylan and Peter, Paul and Mary that was just beginning to be noticed by the folk music world. Eder called the album "...basically cheerful, optimistic music celebrating youth, nowhere more so than on John Stewart's title song, a bold, optimistic celebration of the Kennedy era."

== Reissues ==
- New Frontier was reissued along with Time to Think on CD by Collectors Choice Records in 2000. The reissue includes both versions of "Greenback Dollar" – the album track and the single with the word "damn" covered up with a guitar chord.
- In 2000, all of the tracks from New Frontier were included in The Stewart Years 10-CD box set issued by Bear Family Records.

== Track listing ==
=== Side one ===
1. "Greenback Dollar" (Hoyt Axton, Kennard Ramsey)
2. "Some Fool Made a Soldier of Me" (Jerry Fuller)
3. "To Be Redeemed" (Jane Bowers)
4. "Honey, Are You Mad at Your Man?" (Nick Reynolds, Bob Shane, John Stewart)
5. "Adios Farewell" (Terry Gilkyson)
6. "Poor Ellen Smith" (Reynolds, Shane, Stewart)

=== Side two ===
1. "My Lord What a Mornin'" (Reynolds, Shane, Stewart)
2. "Long Black Veil" (Danny Dill, Marijohn Wilkin)
3. "Genny Glenn" (Reynolds, Shane, Stewart)
4. "The First Time" (Ewan MacColl)
5. "Dogie's Lament" (Reynolds, Shane, Stewart)
6. "The New Frontier" (Stewart)

== Personnel ==
- Bob Shane – vocals, guitar
- Nick Reynolds – vocals, tenor guitar, bongos, conga
- John Stewart – vocals, banjo, guitar
- Dean Reilly – bass

== Production notes ==
- Voyle Gilmore – producer

== Chart positions ==
Year	Chart	Position
1962	Billboard Pop Albums	16
