= ...from the "Hungry i" =

Live album by The Kingston Trio
- Released: January 5, 1959
- Recorded: August 15–16, 1958
- Venues: The hungry i, San Francisco, California
- Genre: Folk
- Length: 35:38
- Label: Capitol
- Producer: Voyle Gilmore

The Kingston Trio chronology
The Kingston Trio (1958)	...from the "Hungry i" (1959)	Stereo Concert (1959)

...from the "Hungry i" is the Kingston Trio's first live album, released in 1959. It was recorded in 1958 at the San Francisco club hungry i shortly after the release of their debut album The Kingston Trio. It was awarded an RIAA gold album on October 24, 1960, and presented to the group in 1961.

== History ==
What producer Voyle Gilmore heard when he first saw the Kingston Trio at The Purple Onion in 1958 persuaded him to sign the group to Capitol Records. ...from the "Hungry i" was released in order to expose the record buying public to what live audiences experienced at a Trio performance. This appeal was successfully conveyed with this live album, indicated by its number 2 chart position and its gold album award. The Trio was a carefully rehearsed act, with the jokes and introductions to songs planned, delivered, and graded by their manager Frank Werber. Gilmore recorded two nights of the group's twenty-seven-day engagement at the club.

In 1964, the hungry i would also be the location for the recording of the Trio's final album for Capitol Back in Town by the John Stewart Trio.

== Reception ==
Professional ratings
Review scores
Source	Rating
Allmusic	4/5 stars

The album was awarded an RIAA gold album on October 24, 1960.

In his Allmusic review, critic Ronnie D. Lankford Jr. notes the intensity of the trio's performances and the audience reactions. Lankford writes their first live album "captures the band live, singing vibrant versions of 'Tic, Tic' and 'They Call the Wind Maria.' Because of the acoustic arrangements and professionalism of the band, this live performance easily matches the quality of the group's studio work."

== Reissues ==
- ...from the "Hungry i" was released on CD by Capitol Records in 1992 paired with The Kingston Trio. It has since been withdrawn by Capitol.
- In 1997, all of the tracks of ...from the "Hungry i" were included in The Guard Years 10-CD box set issued by Bear Family Records.
- Collector's Choice Records reissued The Kingston Trio / ...from the "Hungry" i as a two-album CD in 2001.
- Some tracks from ...from the "Hungry i" were reissued in 1961 by Capitol on Encores, a duophonic reissue of cuts from the first two albums.
- The original LP was reissued as a "Capitol Monophonic Re-issue" ca. 1980 with Capitol Records catalog number M-11968. The back of the record jacket had a UPC symbol in the upper right with the code 0 7777-11968-1. The label on the record was black lettering on dark blue with a large classic Capitol logo at the top.

== Track listing ==
The original LP release had eleven songs.

Side One
No.	Title	Writer(s)	Length
1.	"Tic Tic Tic"	Rafael DeLeon, Don Raye	2:12
2.	"Gue Gue"	Traditional, Dave Guard, Nick Reynolds, Bob Shane	2:52
3.	"Dorie"	Traditional, Guard, Reynolds, Shane	3:00
4.	"South Coast"	Richard Dehr, Sam Eskin, Frank Miller, Lillian Ross	4:27
5.	"Zombie Jamboree"	Conrad Eugene Mauge Jr.	3:16
6.	"Wimoweh"	Paul Campbell, Solomon Linda	2:47

Side Two
No.	Title	Writer(s)	Length
1.	"New York Girls"	Burl Ives	2:37
2.	"They Call the Wind Maria"	Alan Jay Lerner, Frederick Loewe	4:49
3.	"The Merry Minuet"	Sheldon Harnick	2:26
4.	"Shady Grove/Lonesome Traveller"	Traditional	3:32
5.	"When the Saints Go Marching In"	Traditional	3:44

== Personnel ==
- Dave Guard – vocals, banjo, guitar
- Bob Shane – vocals, guitar
- Nick Reynolds – vocals, tenor guitar, bongos, conga
- David "Buck" Wheat – bass

== Chart positions ==
Year	Chart	Position
1959	Billboard Pop Albums	2

== See also ==
- 1959 in music
