= Something Special (The Kingston Trio album) =

Studio album by The Kingston Trio
- Released: July 1962
- Recorded: April 1962
- Studio: Capitol Studios, Los Angeles, California
- Genre: Folk
- Label: Capitol
- Producer: Voyle Gilmore

The Kingston Trio chronology
College Concert (1962)	Something Special (1962)	New Frontier (1962)

Singles from Something Special
- 1. "One More Town"/"She Was Too Good to Me" Released: 1962

Something Special is an album by the American folk music group the Kingston Trio, released in 1962 (see 1962 in music). It reached number 7 on the Billboard Pop Albums chart. The lead-off single was a non-album track "C'mon Betty Home" b/w "Old Joe Clark". "One More Town" b/w "She Was Too Good to Me" was released as a single later the same year. Neither single made the Top 40. Something Special was nominated for a Grammy Award in the Best Folk Recording category.

A notable feature of Something Special is that it was highly orchestrated, using strings, brass instruments and a choir.

== Reception ==
Professional ratings
Review scores
Source	Rating
Allmusic	3/5 stars

Allmusic music critic Bruce Eder wrote the album "was the oddest of all the Kingston Trio's albums... a marked departure from previous work by the trio... The results aren't bad so much as they are strange at times."

== Reissues ==
- Something Special was reissued along with Back in Town on CD by Collectors Choice Records in 2000. A bonus track, "C'mon Betty Home" is included.
- In 2000, all of the tracks from Something Special were included in The Stewart Years 10-CD box set issued by Bear Family Records. This collection also includes eleven tracks without Jimmie Haskell's orchestral overdubs; the twelfth cut, "Old Joe Clark," appeared on the album as it was originally recorded.

== Track listing ==
=== Side one ===
1. "Brown Mountain Light" (Scotty Wiseman) – 2:48
2. "One More Town" (John Stewart) – 2:57
3. "Oh Willow Waley" (Georges Auric, Paul Dehan) – 2:46
4. "Tell it on the Mountain" (Traditional, Nick Reynolds, Bob Shane, Stewart) – 1:55
5. "Little Boy" (Mike Settle) – 2:33
6. "Strange Day" (Stewart, George Yanok) – 3:55

=== Side two ===
1. "Away Rio" (Reynolds, Shane, Stewart) – 2:57
2. "Pullin' Away" (Reynolds, Shane, Stewart) – 3:17
3. "She Was Too Good To Me (Richard Rodgers, Lorenz Hart) – 2:46
4. "Jane, Jane, Jane" (Stan Wilson) – 2:51
5. "Portland Town" (Stewart) – 1:59
6. "Old Joe Clark" (Traditional) – 1:58

== Personnel ==
- Bob Shane – vocals, guitar
- Nick Reynolds – vocals, tenor guitar, bongos, conga
- John Stewart – vocals, banjo, guitar
- Dean Reilly – bass

== Production notes ==
- Voyle Gilmore – producer
- Pete Abbott – engineer
- Jimmie Haskell – arrangements, conductor

== Chart positions ==
Year	Chart	Position
1962	Billboard Pop Albums	7
