= Stay Awhile (The Kingston Trio album) =

Studio album by The Kingston Trio
- Released: May 1965
- Recorded: 1965
- Genre: Folk
- Length: 40:39 (reissue)
- Label: Decca
- Producer: Frank Werber

The Kingston Trio chronology
The Kingston Trio (Nick Bob John) (1964)	Stay Awhile (1965)	Somethin' Else (1965)

Singles from Stay Awhile
- 1. "Yes I Can Feel It"/"Stay Awhile" Released: 1965

Alternative Cover
- Cover of the Folk Era reissue of the LP

Stay Awhile is an album by the American folk music group the Kingston Trio, released in 1965 (see 1965 in music). It was their second release on the Decca label. It continued their downward slide in the charts, reaching number 126 on the Billboard Pop Albums chart. The single "Yes I Can Feel It" b/w "Stay Awhile" did not chart.

== Reception ==
Professional ratings
Review scores
Source	Rating
Allmusic	4/5 stars
Record Mirror	3/5 stars

Allmusic critic Bruce Eder, in reviewing the reissue, praised the album, writing "This was a pretty strong album to begin with... It's all surprisingly memorable, coming out of a period in which the Trio's records simply weren't selling... The result is a CD every bit as good, and perhaps better than many of the group's classic Capitol sides.

== Reissues ==
- Stay Awhile was reissued on a remastered CD in 1994 on the Folk Era label. It includes the single version of "Yes, I Can Feel It" versus the original album version.
- In 2000, all of the tracks from Stay Awhile were included in The Stewart Years 10-CD box set issued by Bear Family Records.
- Stay Awhile was reissued on CD in 2002 by Folk Era along with the rest of their Decca releases on The Decca Years.

== Track listing ==
=== Side one ===
1. "Hanna Lee" (Stan Jones, Richard Mills) – 3:14
2. "Three Song" (Mason Williams) – 2:08
3. "Gonna Go Down the River" (Dallas Frazier, Buddy Mize) – 2:01
4. "Rusting in the Rain" (Rod McKuen) – 2:43
5. "Dooley" (Rodney Dillard, Mitch Jayne) – 1:53
6. "If I Had a Ship" (Williams) – 3:28

=== Side two ===
1. "Yes I Can Feel It" (Williams) – 2:28
2. "Bottle of Wine" (Tom Paxton) – 1:56
3. "Stories of Old" (John Stewart) –3:01
4. "Where I'm Bound" (Paxton) – 2:37
5. "If You See Me Go" (Stewart) – 2:00
6. "Stay Awhile" (Nick Reynolds, Bob Shane, John Stewart) – 2:12
  1994 reissue bonus tracks:
7. "Dancing Distance" (Stewart, Williams) – 2:36
8. "They Are Gone" (Williams) – 2:43
9. "Last Thing on My Mind" (Paxton) – 3:02
10. "Early Morning Rain" (Gordon Lightfoot) – 2:37

== Personnel ==
- Bob Shane – vocals, guitar
- Nick Reynolds – vocals, tenor guitar
- John Stewart – vocals, banjo, guitar
- Dean Reilly – bass

== Production notes ==
- Frank Werber – producer
- Bob Norberg – engineer
- Mason Williams – liner notes

== Chart positions ==
Year	Chart	Position
1965	Billboard Pop Albums	126
