= The Best of the Decca Years =

Greatest hits album by The Kingston Trio
- Released: June 2, 1998
- Genre: Folk
- Label: MCA
- Producer: Frank Werber; Todd Everett (reissue producer)

The Kingston Trio chronology
The Kingston Trio: The Guard Years (1997)	The Best of the Decca Years (1998)	The Kingston Trio: The Stewart Years (2000)

The Best of the Decca Years is a compilation of The Kingston Trio's recordings when the group was on the Decca Records label.

== Reception ==
Professional ratings
Review scores
Source	Rating
Allmusic	4/5 stars

Writing for Allmusic, music critic Cub Koda wrote of the album; "Although painted as a quaint coffeehouse group from the hootenanny days of folk music's history, the Kingston Trio actually had pretty big ears for a wide variety of material, ranging from pop to obscure Broadway material, to songs from up-and-coming folk artists they had originally influenced... this collection shines a light on a part of the group's history usually ignored, and shows that much good music emerged during their final days."

== Track listing ==
1. "Stay Awhile" (Nick Reynolds, Bob Shane, John Stewart) – 2:15
2. "Long Time Blues" (Mason Williams) – 2:21
3. "Love's Been Good to Me" (Rod McKuen) – 3:09
4. "Poverty Hill" (Fred Hellerman, Fran Minkoff) – 3:24
5. "My Ramblin' Boy" (Tom Paxton) – 3:46
6. "Three Song" (Williams) – 2:10
7. "I Can't Help But Wonder Where I'm Bound" (Paxton) – 2:40
8. "Rusting in the Rain" (McKuen) – 2:46
9. "They Are Gone" (Williams) – 2:46
10. "Lei Pakalana" (Samuel F. Omar) – 2:16
11. "Children of the Morning" (Stewart) – 2:42
12. "Hit and Run" (Stewart) – 2:16
13. "Less of Me" (Glen Campbell) – 2:25
14. "Lock All the Windows" (Stewart) – 3:17
15. "Gonna Go Down the River" (Dallas Frazier, Buddy Mize) – 2:04
16. "I'm Going Home" (Fred Geis) – 2:24

== Personnel ==
- Bob Shane – vocals, guitar, banjo
- Nick Reynolds – vocals, tenor guitar, bongos, conga
- John Stewart – vocals, banjo, guitar, harmonica
- Dean Reilly – bass

== Production notes ==
- Frank Werber – producer
- Todd Everett – reissue producer
