= The Kingston Trio (album) =

Studio album by The Kingston Trio
- Released: June 1, 1958
- Recorded: February 5, 6, 7, 1958
- Studio: Capitol (Hollywood)
- Genre: Folk
- Length: 30:43
- Label: Capitol
- Producer: Voyle Gilmore

The Kingston Trio chronology
The Kingston Trio (1958)	...from the "Hungry i" (1959)

Singles from The Kingston Trio
- 1. "Scarlet Ribbons"/"Three Jolly Coachmen" Released: 1958; 2. "Tom Dooley" Released: 1958

The Kingston Trio is the Kingston Trio's debut album, released in 1958 (see 1958 in music). It entered the album charts in late October 1958, where it resided for nearly four years, spending one week at #1 in early 1959. It was awarded an RIAA gold album on January 19, 1961.

== History ==
Dave Guard, Nick Reynolds, and Bob Shane formed the Kingston Trio in Palo Alto, California in June 1957. By 1958 they had signed a 7-year recording contract with Capitol Records and began a 3-day recording session with producer Voyle Gilmore at Capitol Studio B in Hollywood on February 5. From their first recording sessions, the single "Tom Dooley" was released and became a number one hit in the US. The single's success helped propel their debut album to the number one spot of the Billboard Pop chart. "Tom Dooley" was the Trio's second single—the first was "Scarlet Ribbons" b/w "Three Jolly Coachmen" —and it would remain on the charts for five months and earned the group their only gold single.

The members were quoted in various articles, even the liner notes of the first album, separating themselves from more traditional folk artists. Reynolds stated "We don't collect old songs in the sense that the academic cats do. Each one of us has his ears open constantly to new material or old stuff that's good." Guard is quoted "We are not students of folk music; the basic thing for us is honest and worthwhile songs, that people can pick up and become involved in... When the performance is over the piece is not significant anymore."

"Scotch and Soda" was discovered by the Trio through Tom Seaver's parents, who had first heard it when on their honeymoon. One member of the trio was dating Seaver's older sister at that time, and heard the song on a visit to the Seaver home. Although it is credited to Dave Guard, the trio never did discover the real songwriter's name, though they searched for years.

During these same sessions, the trio recorded "Dodi Li" which was left off the album. It later appeared on ...from the Hungry i as "Dorie".

== Reception ==
The album entered the Billboard album charts in late October 1958 and stayed there for nearly four years. It spent one week at #1 in early 1959. It was awarded an RIAA gold album on January 19, 1961.

== Legacy ==
In an AllMusic retrospective summary, Bruce Eder calls the Kingston Trio's debut album less polished than other contemporary folk music groups such as The Easy Riders but feels that they made up for it "with youthful spring, exuberance, freshness, and a number of song choices that spoke of a new generation of folk singing." He also notes "one also gets a sense of just how strong the trio was musically right out of the starting gate—The Kingston Trio was essentially an idealized version of the group's stage show of the era, recorded over three days in the studio, and a fine, bracing body of music."

== Reissues ==
- The Kingston Trio was reissued on LP under the title of Tom Dooley with "Banua" and "Santy Anno" deleted.
- Some tracks from The Kingston Trio were reissued in 1961 by Capitol on Encores, a duophonic reissue of cuts from the first two albums.
- The Kingston Trio was released on CD by Capitol Records in 1992 paired with ...from the Hungry i. It has since been withdrawn by Capitol.
- In 1997, all of the tracks from The Kingston Trio were included in The Guard Years 10-CD box set issued by Bear Family Records.
- Collector's Choice Records reissued The Kingston Trio / ...from the Hungry i as a two-album CD in 2001.

== Track listing ==
=== Side one ===
1. "Three Jolly Coachmen" (Traditional; arranged by Dave Guard) – 1:48
2. "Bay of Mexico" (Traditional; arranged by Dave Guard) – 2:52
3. "Banua" (Traditional; arranged by Dave Guard) – 1:38
4. "Tom Dooley" (Alan Lomax, Frank Warner) – 3:04
5. "Fast Freight" (Terry Gilkyson) – 3:48
6. "Hard, Ain't It Hard" (Woody Guthrie) – 2:24

=== Side two ===
1. "Saro Jane" (Traditional; arranged and adapted by Louis Gottlieb) – 2:24
2. "(The Wreck of The) 'John B'" (Traditional) – 3:32
3. "Santy Anno" (Traditional; arranged by Dave Guard) – 2:17
4. "Scotch and Soda" (Dave Guard) – 2:33
5. "Coplas" (Traditional; arranged by Dave Guard) – 2:39
6. "Little Maggie" (Dave Guard) – 1:48

The US release specifies writer credits for "(The Wreck of The) 'John B' as Lee Hays and Carl Sandburg. Neither wrote the song as it was originally a traditional folk song from the Bahamas. Carl Sandburg included it in a collection of folk songs, The American Songbag in 1927 and Lee Hays (a member of the Weavers) helped popularize the song in a rendition released in 1950 titled "Wreck of the John B". The Kingston Trio version was the inspiration for the Beach Boys 1965 version "Sloop John B".

== Personnel ==
- Dave Guard – vocals, banjo, guitar
- Bob Shane – vocals, guitar, banjo
- Nick Reynolds – vocals, tenor guitar, bongos, conga
- Elmer "Buzz" Wheeler – bass

Production notes:

- Voyle Gilmore – producer
- Curley Walters – engineer
- Paul Speegle – original liner notes

== Chart positions ==
Weekly chart performance for The Kingston Trio
Chart (1958)	Peak position
Billboard Best Selling LP'S	1
