= The Decca Years (The Kingston Trio album) =

Compilation album by The Kingston Trio
- Released: April 16, 2002
- Genre: Folk
- Label: Folk Era
- Producer: Frank Werber; Allan Shaw (reissue producer)

The Kingston Trio chronology
The Kingston Trio: The Stewart Years (2000)	The Decca Years (2002)	Once Again (2004)

The Decca Years is a compilation of The Kingston Trio's four albums recorded for the Decca Records label. Folk Era had previously reissued The Kingston Trio (Nick Bob John), Stay Awhile and Children of the Morning, each including tracks from Somethin' Else as bonus tracks. They are presented here in the same song order as the reissues.

== Reception ==
Professional ratings
Review scores
Source	Rating
Allmusic	4/5 stars

Writing for Allmusic, music critic Zac Johnson wrote of the album; "This three-disc set from Folk Era Records covers the Kingston Trio's Decca recordings from 1964-1967... An informative booklet containing a history of this era and the original liner notes only sweetens the deal."

== Track listing ==
1. "Midnight Special" (Lead Belly) – 2:07
2. "Love's Been Good to Me" (Rod McKuen) – 3:05
3. "Poverty Hill" (Fred Hellerman, Fran Minkoff) – 3:22
4. "Someday Soon" (Ian Tyson) – 2:49
5. "Gotta Travel On" (Paul Clayton, Larry Ehrlich, Ronnie Gilbert, Lee Hays, Fred Hellerman, Dave Lazar, Pete Seeger) – 3:18
6. "Hope You Understand" (John Stewart) – 2:20
7. "Little Play Soldiers" (Martin Cooper) – 2:20
8. "Love Comes a Trickling Down" (Jonathan Harris) – 2:53
9. "My Ramblin' Boy" (Tom Paxton) – 3:42
10. "More Poems" (Mason Williams) – 1:42
11. "Farewell (Fare Thee Well)" (Bob Dylan) – 3:16
12. "I'm Going Home" (Fred Geis) – 2:22
13. "Long Time Blues" (Williams) – 2:21
14. "Come Gather the Time" (Stewart) – 2:26
15. "Hanna Lee" (Stan Jones, Richard Mills) – 3:14
16. "Three Song" (Williams) – 2:08
17. "Gonna Go Down the River" (Dallas Frazier, Buddy Mize) – 2:01
18. "Rusting in the Rain" (Rod McKuen) – 2:43
19. "Dooley" (Rodney Dillard, Mitch Jayne) – 1:53
20. "If I Had a Ship" (Williams) – 3:28
21. "Yes I Can Feel It" (Williams) – 2:28
22. "Bottle of Wine" (Paxton) – 1:56
23. "Stories of Old" (Stewart) –3:01
24. "Where I'm Bound" (Paxton) – 2:37
25. "If You See Me Go" (Stewart) – 2:00
26. "Stay Awhile" (Nick Reynolds, Bob Shane, Stewart) – 2:12
27. "Dancing Distance" (Stewart, Williams) – 2:36
28. "They Are Gone" (Williams) – 2:43
29. "Last Thing on My Mind" (Paxton) – 3:02
30. "Early Morning Rain" (Gordon Lightfoot) – 2:37
31. "Children of the Morning" (Stewart) – 2:41
32. "Hit and Run" (Stewart) – 2:15
33. "When You've Been Away for a Long Time" (Stewart) – 3:07
34. "Lei Pakalana" (Samuel F. Omar) – 2:16
35. "Gaze on Other Heavens" (Stewart) – 2:36
36. "A Taste of Honey" (Bobby Scott, Ric Marlow) – 1:44
37. "Norwegian Wood (This Bird Has Flown)" (John Lennon, Paul McCartney) – 2:21
38. "Put Your Money Away" (Stewart) – 2:47
39. "Lock All the Windows" (Stewart) – 3:16
40. "Less of Me" (Glen Campbell) – 2:25
41. "The Spinnin' of the World" (Stewart) – 2:02
42. "A Little Soul Is Born" (Stewart) – 2:56
43. "Where Are You Going Little Boy?" (Stewart) – 2:23
44. "Go Tell Roger" (Stewart, Randy Cierley) – 1:50
45. "Red River Shore" (Arranged by Jack Splittard, Cierley) – 2:32
46. "Runaway Song" (Stewart) – 2:03

== Personnel ==
- Bob Shane – vocals, guitar, banjo
- Nick Reynolds – vocals, tenor guitar, bongos, conga
- John Stewart – vocals, banjo, guitar, harmonica
- Dean Reilly – bass

== Production notes ==
- Frank Werber – producer
- Allan Shaw – reissue producer
- Ben Blake – liner notes, song annotations
- Bill Bush – liner notes
- Dick Nolan – liner notes
- Mason Williams – liner notes
- John Stewart – liner notes
