= The Old Maid's Song =

American folk song

The Old Maid's Song is an American folk song. It recounts the story of a woman whose younger sisters have married, while she has remained a spinster into middle age. During the chorus of the song, the narrator defines a loose criterion for a husband.

The song is derived from the broadside ballad "The Wooing Maid," a song which dates to the seventeenth century.

== Variations ==
The chorus lyrics vary between different versions of the song. In a version collected in Dover, Vermont in 1919, the chorus is sung:

A linman, a tinman, a tinker, a tailor,
A fiddler, a peddler, a plough-man, a sailor;
Come gentle, come simple, come foolish, come witty,
Don't let me die an old maid, but take me out of pity!

In another variation heard in Pulaski County, Kentucky and published in 1917 differs slightly:

Come a landsman, a pinsman, a tinker or a tailor,
A fiddler or a dancer, a ploughboy or a sailor,
A gentleman or a poor man, a fool or a witty,
Don't you let me die an old maid, but take me out of pity.

In "The Wooing Maid," the ballad from which the song is derived, the first two lines of the chorus belong instead to the first verse:

[...]
Come tinker, come broomman:
She will refuse no man.

Come gentle, come simple, come foolish, come witty,
Oh! if you lack a maid, take me for pitty.

The song is known by many titles, including "Sister Susan", and "The Spinster's Lament", "Old Maid's Complaint", "Old Maid's Lament," "Old Maid in the Garrett," and "Old Maid's Petition".

Pete Seeger recorded a rendition of the song for the Smithsonian Folkways label.

The Kingston Trio's "Take Her Out of Pity", included on their 1961 album Close-Up, is based on the song.
