= The Dixie Bee-Liners =

American bluegrass group

- The Dixie Bee-Liners in 2009; from left to right: Buddy Woodward, Rachel Johnson, Brandi Hart, Jeremy Darrow, Casey Henry, Robin Davis

Background information
- Origin: United States
- Genres: Americana; Progressive Bluegrass; American folk music Alternative country
- Years active: 2002–2012
- Labels: Pinecastle Records, Betty Troublesome
- Members: Buddy Woodward; Brandi Hart
- Website: dixiebeeliners.com

The Dixie Bee-Liners are an American bluegrass group, formed in New York City in 2002 by Buddy Woodward and Brandi Hart. Their music has been called Bluegrass, Americana, alt-country, Folk, and "Bible Belt Noir".

The Bee-Liners have released three records, and two singles. Their first recording was a 2005 self-titled/self-released CD-EP on their own label, Betty Troublesome. Shortly after, Hart and Woodward relocated to Southwest Virginia, and signed with Pinecastle Records, who released their first full-length CD, RIPE, in April 2008.

Their third CD, Susanville, was a bluegrass concept album released in November 2009. Grammy winning producer/engineer Bil VornDick co-produced the 19-song CD, along with Woodward and Hart.

In mid-2012 the band revealed in an interview with Bluegrass Today that they were working on a new album with a projected release of Spring 2013, but the project was never completed and the band folded at the end of 2012.

== Musical style ==
Ostensibly a bluegrass band, The Dixie Bee-Liners played a wide variety of acoustic music, liberally cherry-picking influence from traditional bluegrass, newgrass, old-time string band music, as well as west-coast country, country rock, 60's British Invasion, surf music, Celtic, rhythm & blues, punk, ska, and English folk-rock bands. In mid-2012 the band revealed in an interview with Bluegrass Today that they were evolving their sound, and expanding their lineup to include drums and electric instrumentation, but the project was never completed, and they split at the end of the year.

Buddy Woodward and Brandi Hart typically wrote all of the band's material—with Woodward also taking the role of arranger and producer—though they occasionally co-wrote with various band members, as well as Blue Highway's Tim Stafford, Jon Weisberger, and Ken Stringfellow of the American alternative rock band The Posies.

In addition to standardized bluegrass instrumentation, the band were known to incorporate alternate guitar tunings, claw-hammer banjo, dulcimer, bouzouki, dobro, Dojo, harmonica, chanter, 12-string guitar, drums, electric guitar, pedal steel guitar, cello, Mellotron, harpsichord, and other keyboard instruments.

== Awards, honors, distinctions ==
Their self-titled EP debuted on the Roots Music Report bluegrass chart at No. 14, going on to spend 56 weeks on the chart, with 9 of those weeks in the Top 10. RIPE topped the Bluegrass Now Fan's Choice Top 20 chart twice, and also achieved two simultaneous No. 1's on Bluegrass Music Profiles' Top 20 Hot Singles, and the Roots Music Report Bluegrass Chart. The Bee-Liners spent nine consecutive weeks atop the RMR Bluegrass chart and two consecutive months in the Top Ten of both Bluegrass Unlimited charts. All-told, the band achieved 23 weeks of No. 1's in 2008, and was named the Roots Music Report's Bluegrass Artist of the Year in November 2008. Susanville debuted on the Billboard Bluegrass chart at No. 32.

== Performance ==
The band toured extensively throughout the United States and Canada, playing such prestigious festivals as Merlefest, Grey Fox Bluegrass Festival, Palisade Bluegrass & Roots Festival, Bristol Rhythm & Roots Reunion, FloydFest and Bean Blossom, among many others. They appeared live on BBC Radio Scotland, NPR, the Food Network, and were featured on radio playlists across the country and worldwide, including regular rotation on Sirius and XM satellite radio. In 2007 their music appeared on the soundtrack of the independently produced Civil War film FREEDOM. In August 2010, the band played Fairport's Cropredy Convention Festival in the Oxfordshire village of Cropredy, one of only two gigs in England before returning home.

== Discography ==
=== Upstate Manhattan-compilation ===
October 2005 (207 Records)

1. Lost In The Silence - (Hart, Woodward)

=== The Dixie Bee-Liners-EP ===
November 2005 (Betty Troublesome)

1. Davy - (Hart, Woodward)
2. Brown-Eyed Darlin' - (Woodward)
3. Lost In The Silence - (Hart, Woodward)
4. Roses Are Grey - (Hart, Woodward)
5. Family Tree - (Woodward, Gold, Ribyat)
6. My Heart's Breakin' In - (Hart, Woodward)
7. Yellow-Haired Girl - (Hart, Woodward)
8. (Lord, Lay Down My) Ball & Chain - (Hart, Woodward)

=== Timeless Flyte: A Tribute To The Byrds-compilation ===
2007, RRO Entertainment

1. Change Is Now - (Hillman-McGuinn)

=== Prime Cuts of Bluegrass Volume 90-compilation ===
2007, KBC Music, Inc.

1. Down On The Crooked Road - (Woodward, VornDick, Hart)

=== RIPE ===
April 2008 (Pinecastle Records)

1. Down On The Crooked Road - (Woodward, VornDick, Hart)
2. (Lord, Lay Down My) Ball & Chain - (Hart, Woodward)
3. Yellow-Haired Girl - (Hart, Woodward)
4. The Bugs In The Basement - (Hart, Woodward)
5. Dixie Grey To Black - (Hart, Woodward)
6. Why Do I Make You Cry - (Hart, Woodward)
7. She's My Angel - (Hart, Woodward)
8. Old Charlie Cross - (Hart, Woodward)
9. Lost In The Silence - (Hart, Woodward)
10. Grumble Jones - (Woodward, Stafford)
11. Jefferson Railroad Line - (Hart, Woodward)
12. Ripe - (Hart, Woodward)

=== FestivaLink presents The Dixie Bee-Liners at MerleFest, NC 4/24/09 ===
June 2009 (FesivaLink)

1. Married By The Hanging Judge - (Morrow)
2. (Lord, Lay Down My) Ball & Chain - (Hart, Woodward)
3. Yellow-Haired Girl - (Hart, Woodward)
4. She's My Angel - (Hart, Woodward)
5. The Bugs In The Basement - (Hart, Woodward)
6. Ripe - (Hart, Woodward)
7. Down On The Crooked Road - (Woodward, VornDick, Hart)
8. Why Do I Make You Cry - (Hart, Woodward)
9. I'll Remember You, Love, In My Prayers - (Public Domain) [Bonus Track - 4/26/09 Hillside Stage]
10. Old Charlie Cross - (Hart, Woodward) [Bonus Track - 4/26/09 Hillside Stage]
11. Davy - (Hart, Woodward) [Bonus Track - 4/26/09 Hillside Stage]
12. Possum John - (Johnson) [Bonus Track - 4/26/09 Hillside Stage]

=== She Plays Like A Girl-Digital Single ===
October 2009 (Pinecastle Records)

1. She Plays Like A Girl - (Hart, Woodward)

=== Susanville ===
November 2009 (Pinecastle Records)

1. Enter Highway - (Hart, Woodward)
2. Heavy - (Hart, Woodward)
3. Restless - (Hart, Woodward)
4. Find Out - (Hart, Woodward)
5. Road Hog - (Hart, Woodward, Weisberger)
6. Salem And Staunton - (Darrow)
7. Turn Back - (Hart, Woodward)
8. Truck Stop Baby - (Hart, Woodward)
9. Albion Road - (Morrow)
10. Susanville - (Hart, Woodward)
11. (I Need) Eighteen Wheels - (Hart, Woodward)
12. Trixie's Diesel-Stop Cafe - (Hart, Woodward)
13. Graveyard Shift - (Hart, Woodward)
14. Down - (Woodward. Molotov)
15. Lead Foot - (Morrow, Woodward, Stringfellow, Hart)
16. Yawn - (Hart, Woodward)
17. Brake Lights - (Hart, Stringfellow, Woodward)
18. In My Pocket - (Woodward, Hart, Darrow, Morrow)
19. Destination - (Hart, Woodward)

=== Santa Wants A Whiskey-Digital Single ===
November 2010 (Betty Troublesome)

1. Santa Wants A Whiskey - (Hart, Woodward)

=== Bluegrass Bands Helping Hands Volume Three: Big Leagues-compilation ===
September 2011 (Miracle League)

1. Find Out - (Hart, Woodward)

== Sources ==
- Roanoke Times "Dixie Bee-Liners Move To The Mountains" by Tad Dickens, July 24, 2006
- Owensboro Messenger-Inquirer "Reviews of new bluegrass music releases" by Keith Lawrence, October 30, 2009
- Bluegrass Today "Dixie Bee-Liners back in the studio" Guest Contributor, October 2011
- Bluegrass Now "Dixie Bee-Liners Take A New Tack" by John Lawless, August 29, 2012

== Reviews, articles, notices ==
- Country Standard Time " Are Dixie Bee-Liners 'Ripe' for Success?" by Ken Burke, April 2008
- Folk and Acoustic Music Exchange "Ripe" by Frank Gutch Jr., June 2008
- NPR Music.com "Dixie Bee-Liners: Musical Hospitality" by Jim Blum, July 1, 2009
- The Bluegrass Blog "Dixie Bee-Liners Video Shoot" by John Lawless, October 19, 2009
- BluegrassJournal.com "Dixie Bee-Liners, Sierra Hull Uncle Earl head out on American Revival Tour Oct. 29" by Travis Tackett, October 28, 2009.
- Owensboro Messenger-Inquirer "Reviews of new bluegrass music releases" by Keith Lawrence, October 30, 2009
- 9513 Country Music.com "Dixie Bee-Liners, Sierra Hull and Uncle Earl Spread The Gospel of Old-Time and Bluegrass" by Juli Thanki, November 4, 2009.
- Cybergrass "Dixie Bee-Liner's 'Susanville' A Trip for the Listener" by Bob Cherry, November 7, 2009
- Bluegrass Music Profiles "Dixie Bee-Liners - Susanville" by Lori Kerfoot, November 11, 2009
- Folkwax "The Dixie Beeliners Make A Bee Line for Hits" by Deborah Wilbrink, November 11, 2009
- FAME "Susanville: A Review written for the Folk and Acoustic Music Exchange" by Frank Gutch Jr., November 2009
- Country Standard Time "Susanville - Dixie Bee-Liners" by Greg Yost, November 2009
- The Lonesome Road "Review: “Susanville” by The Dixie Bee-Liners" by Donald Teplyske, January 2010
