= Boobam =

Tuned hand drum

Percussion instrument
- Classification: Percussion (Membranophone)
- Hornbostel–Sachs classification: 211.211.1 (Open ended cylindrical drum)
- Developed: Middle 20th century

The boobam is a percussion instrument of the membranophone family consisting of an array of tubes with membranes stretched on one end, the other end open. The tuning depends partly on the tension on the membrane and partly on the length of the tube.

== History ==
In 1948 Harry Partch, an American composer, developed a system of music that depended on the building of various instruments that could play non-tempered scales. Some of them were based on Greek models and some on more primitive instruments like marimbas. Musician David "Buck" Wheat and his roommate in Sausalito, California, Bill Loughborough, a musician and electronic engineer, assisted Partch in the development of his instruments.

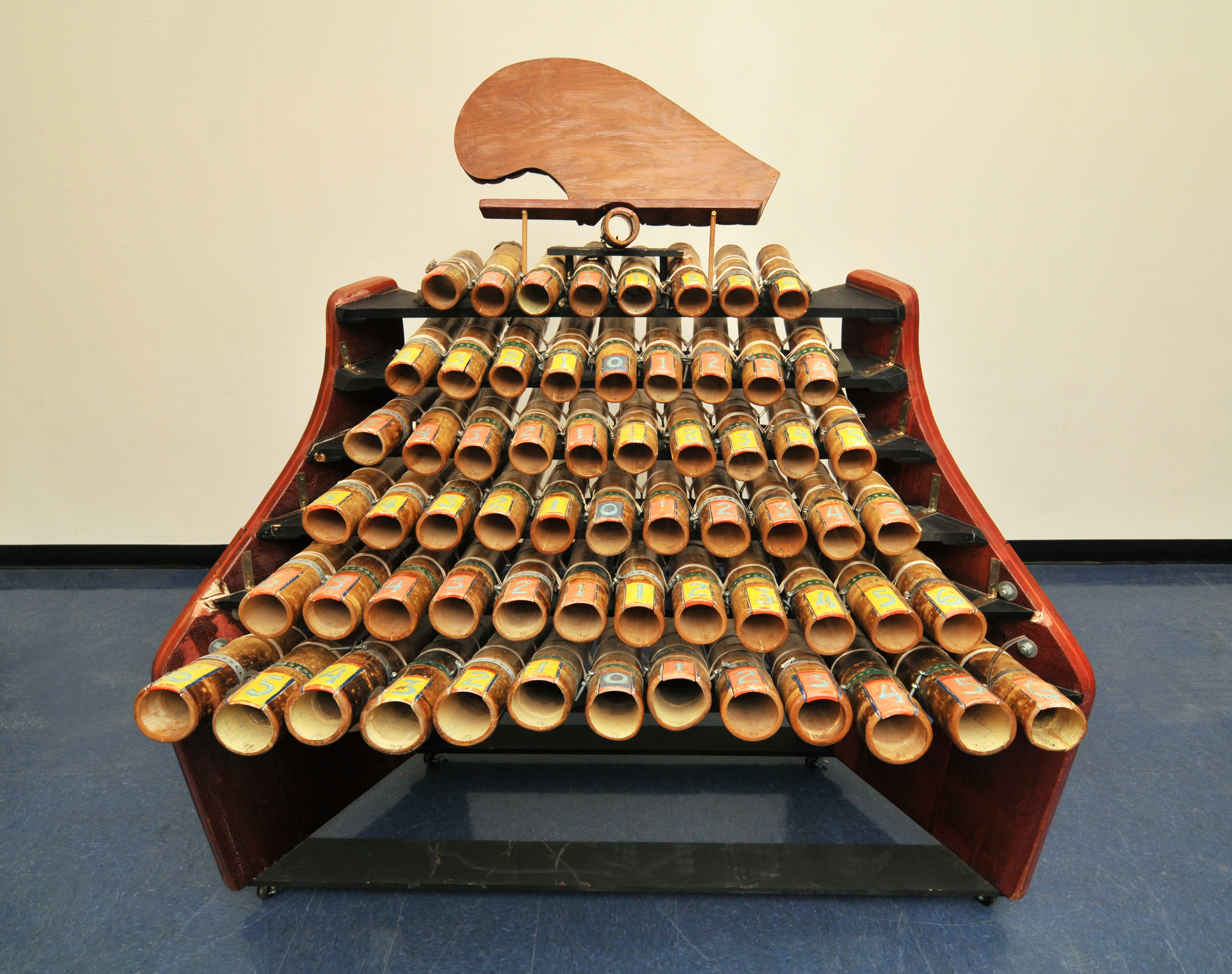
Harry Partch's "Boo"

Around 1955-1956 Partch designed and built an instrument he called the "boo", short for "bamboo marimba". This instrument, a lamellophone, consisted of sections of bamboo with one end closed, and a tongue cut in the side, tuned to the same pitch as the resonating chamber of the stopped bamboo section. The instrument is played with felt-covered sticks, and has a very dry, short duration percussive tone, but with a particular pitch.

Buck Wheat and Loughborough then moved onto a Sausalito barge with Jak Simpson who in 1954 had founded a business named the "BooBam Bamboo Drum Company". Experimenting further with Partch's boo concept, they hit on the idea of covering the closed section of the bamboo tube with a small drum head, dispensing with the tongue, and playing on the membrane of the head, instead. The specific pitch of the drum could be tuned by changing the tension on the drum head, and adjusting the length of the bamboo tube until a resonator of the desired pitch was obtained. The name boobam was coined in Mill Valley, California in 1954 and was described as "bamboo spelled sideways". Buck Wheat was employed as a bass player on a cruise liner at the time, and he would buy large diameter giant bamboo while in the Philippines, and bring back it back to the states.

While the resonating the tubes were originally made from lengths of giant bamboo, pipes of wood, plastic, metal, and cardboard have since also been used. The membranes were originally goat or calfskin but most are now synthetic (plastic) drumheads.

Jazz groups were fascinated by the instrument and added the boobams to their percussion sections. In 1956 Chet Baker's Ensemble used them on the Today Show. Their unique sound inspired Nick Reynolds of The Kingston Trio who eagerly included them on their tour with his percussion solo being featured on "O Ken Karanga" on the album College Concert recorded at UCLA in 1962.

== Construction ==
Boobams are essentially tuned bongos constructed with a shell of natural bamboo, ABS, plywood, or other suitable material. The available width and depth of the shell, which contributes to the desired pitch, originally limited by the size of available bamboo found typically in the tropical islands of the Pacific Ocean. With the adoption of wood, plastic and other synthetic materials, a modern boobam can be made to produce virtually any desired pitch. Sets featuring the pitches of one, two, or three octaves of the common 12-tet scale have become common, and are available from several makers.

Similar instruments appear as ethnic drums in the Pacific Islands, but the modern instrument found its way into current use through its appearance on numerous recordings in Hollywood beginning in the 1950s. Two sets of boobams were owned and used by West Coast jazz drummer Shelly Manne for numerous recording sessions in the Los Angeles studios.

== See also ==
- Bongo
- Harry Partch
- Octoban
- Rototom
