= The Kingston Trio: The Stewart Years =

Compilation album by The Kingston Trio
- Released: April 25, 2000
- Recorded: August 15, 1961 – July 1966
- Genre: Folk
- Label: Bear Family
- Producer: Voyle Gilmore, Frank Werber; Paul Surratt (reissue producer)

The Kingston Trio chronology
The Best of the Decca Years (1998)	The Kingston Trio: The Stewart Years (2000)	The Decca Years (2002)

The Kingston Trio: The Stewart Years is a compilation of The Kingston Trio's recordings when John Stewart was a member of the Trio along with Bob Shane and Nick Reynolds.

The Stewart Years is a 10-CD box set and was released in 2000. It contains 286 songs, many of them are previously unissued and live tracks. The set includes a hardcover book containing photos and stories of the group, recording sessions, and notes on the songs.

== Reception ==
Professional ratings
Review scores
Source	Rating
Allmusic	2.5/5 stars

Allmusic critic Greg Adams was equivocal about the extent of the package, writing: "The Stewart Years is a gorgeous ten-disc box set with hardbound book that collects everything the Trio recorded during Stewart's tenure... The Stewart version of the trio was more pop-oriented, political, and experimental (some unsuccessful attempts at folk-rock are preserved for posterity here). While they had their successes... their clean-cut collegiate image could never quite adapt to the counterculture and protest folk movement... The Stewart Years is a beautiful, comprehensive, and expensive artifact suitable for libraries and affluent fans."

== Personnel ==
- Bob Shane – vocals, guitar, banjo
- Nick Reynolds – vocals, tenor guitar, bongos, conga
- John Stewart – vocals, banjo, guitar, harmonica
- Dean Reilly – bass
- Glen Campbell – banjo, guitar
- John Staubard – guitar
- Andy Belling – organ
- George Callender – bass
- Randy Cierley – guitar, percussion
- Irving Cottler – drums
- John Chambers – drums
- Jerry Granelli – drums
- Modesto Duran – percussion
- Harold Hensley – fiddle
- Jack Marshall – guitar
- Allan Reuss – guitar
- Manuel Stevens – trumpet
- Anthony Terran – trumpet
- John Rotella – reeds
- Art Smith – reeds
- Ben Kanter – reeds
- William Hinshaw – French horn
- Darrel Terwilliger – violin
- Tibor Zelig – violin
- Leonard Malarsky – violin
- Sidney Sharp – violin
- Myron Sandler – viola
- Harry Hyams – viola
- Alexander Neiman – viola
- Joseph DiFiore – viola
- Emmet Sargeant – cello
- Jimmie Haskell – arranger, leader

== Production notes ==
- Voyle Gilmore – producer
- Frank Werber – producer
- Paul Surratt – reissue producer, photography, illustrations
- Adam Skeaping – mastering
- Jay Ranellucci – mixing
- Richard Weize – tape research, discography
- R. A. Andreas – photography, illustrations
- Henry Diltz – photography, illustrations
- George Karras – photography, illustrations
- Wolfgang Taubenauer – artwork
- Holger Von Bargen – art direction
- Ben Blake – discography, song notes
- Bill Bush – biographical information
- Russ Wapensky – discography
