= Voyle Gilmore =

American record producer

Voyle Gilmore (June 14, 1912 – December 19, 1979) was an American record producer and arranger. He was best known for his work with Frank Sinatra and The Kingston Trio on Capitol Records. Gilmore also worked with Judy Garland, Dick Dale, Dean Martin, Louis Prima, The Andrews Sisters, Les Paul and Mary Ford, The Four Preps, The Four Freshmen, and The Four Seasons. Gilmore was the producer of the original live tapes used on The Beatles at the Hollywood Bowl.
