= Nick Reynolds =

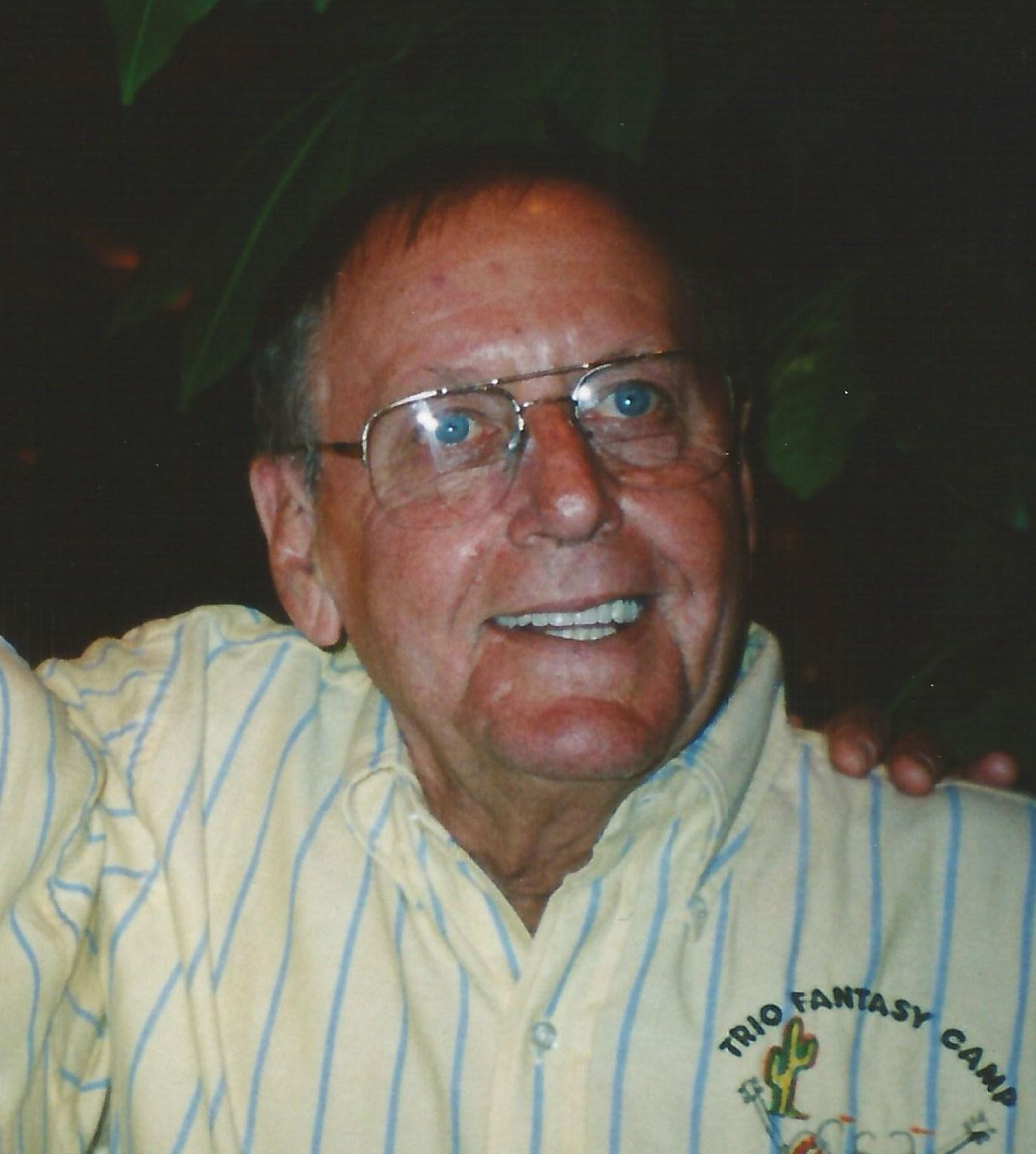
- Reynolds in 2003

Background information
- Born: Nicholas Wells Reynolds; July 27, 1933; San Diego, California, U.S.
- Died: October 1, 2008 (aged 75) San Diego, California, U.S.
- Genres: Folk
- Occupation: Musician
- Instruments: Tenor guitar; conga; bongos; boobams
- Years active: 1957–1967; 1988–1998
- Labels: Capitol; Decca
- Formerly of: The Kingston Trio

Nicholas Wells Reynolds (July 27, 1933 – October 1, 2008) was an American folk musician and recording artist. Reynolds was one of the founding members of the Kingston Trio, whose folk and folk-style material captured international attention during the late Fifties and early Sixties.

== Biography ==
=== Early life ===
Born in San Diego and growing up in Coronado, California, Reynolds' passions were tennis, skin-diving, and singing with his family. His father, a Navy captain, was an avid guitar player who brought back songs from his travels around the world. He taught Nick the guitar and ukulele, and the family spent many nights singing and harmonizing for pure enjoyment. Reynolds enrolled in Menlo College in 1954 as a business major and met Bob Shane in an accounting class. They soon started socializing together, and this in turn led to playing music as a duo — Shane's guitar and Reynolds' bongos became fixtures at local fraternity gatherings. After a few weeks of this, Shane introduced Reynolds to Dave Guard.

=== Career ===
The Kingston Trio was largely inspired by The Weavers but carried the concept of a folk-group, especially one featuring a guitar/banjo combination, further into the mainstream of mid-to-late 50s popular music. In turn, the Trio became an early inspiration to countless later groups, including The Beach Boys — whose striped shirts on their first album cover intentionally emulated what the Kingston Trio wore — and Peter, Paul and Mary — who owed their fundamental concept as a mainstream folk/pop group to its originators, the Kingston Trio and the Weavers.

Shane returned to Hawaii for a time to work for his father's sporting goods company. Guard and Reynolds began playing with Joe Gannon on bass and singer Barbara Bogue and became Dave Guard & the Calypsonians. Reynolds then left for a time following his graduation and was replaced by Don McArthur in a group that was known as the Kingston Quartet, and in a resulting shuffle, Reynolds and Shane (back from Hawaii) returned to the group, now rechristened the Kingston Trio. Their initial approach to music was determined by the skills that each member brought to the trio — Nick Reynolds sang a third above the melody and played tenor guitar as well percussion instruments such as bongos, congas, and boobams. Reynolds provided an ebullient vocal style for the group, superb harmonizing, and an ability to convey tender lyrics with a touching intimacy. The trio disbanded in 1967 but was revived in 1969 as "The New Kingston Trio" under the direction of original member Bob Shane. It continues to the present under its original name, although Shane retired from performing in 2004. When the Trio disbanded, Reynolds moved to Port Orford, Oregon where he spent twenty years ranching and raising four children.

In Oregon, Reynolds returned to motor racing, which he had first tried as a novice in the early 1950s. He helped finance Nade Bourgeault's operation in Mill Valley, California and raced the Bourgeault Formula C car in the Northern Pacific Division of the SCCA in 1967, finishing second in the divisional championship. He moved up to Formula B in 1968 with a Brabham BT21 and was again second in the Divisional title.

In 1981 the Trio reunited featuring Bob Shane, Nick Reynolds, Dave Guard, John Stewart, George Grove and Roger Gambill. A PBS Reunion Special was recorded, hosted by Tommy Smothers and featuring special guest Mary Travers. In 1983, Nick Reynolds (known within the group as "Budgie") collaborated with John Stewart and Lindsey Buckingham on a new album/CD Revenge of the Budgie with seven new recordings.

In the mid-eighties Reynolds moved back to California and rejoined the Trio from 1988 through 1999. He retired for the second time in December, 1999. Folk Music Archives interviewed the Trio in San Antonio and New York City when Nick Reynolds performed in his last show with the group during a concert with the San Antonio Symphony.

Reynolds lived the last years of his life comfortably in Coronado, California with his wife Leslie. For eight years, he joined John Stewart to do a “Trio” fantasy camp in Scottsdale, Arizona. In addition to sharing a dinner with a question-and-answer session, campers joined Reynolds and Stewart on stage to perform a song, becoming for that one moment a member of a fantasy "Kingston Trio."

Reynolds died in San Diego on October 1, 2008, at the age of 75 from acute respiratory disease.
