= The Kingston Trio =

American folk and pop music group

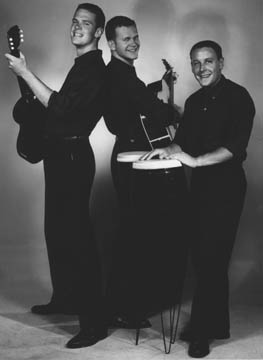
- The Kingston Trio's original lineup: Dave Guard, Bob Shane and Nick Reynolds

Background information
- Origin: Palo Alto, California
- Genres: Folk, pop
- Years active: 1957–1967, 1976–present (overall); 1957–1967 (original lineups); 1969–1976 ("The New Kingston Trio")
- Labels: Capitol, Decca
- Members: Mike Marvin; Tim Gorelangton; Paul Robinson
- Past members: Bob Shane; Nick Reynolds; Dave Guard; John Stewart; Jim Connor; Pat Horine; Roger Gambill; George Grove; Bob Haworth; Bill Zorn; Rick Dougherty; Josh Reynolds; Don Marovich; Buddy Woodward
- Website: kingstontrio.com

The Kingston Trio is an American folk and pop music group that helped launch the folk revival of the late 1950s to the late 1960s. The group started as a San Francisco Bay Area nightclub act with an original lineup of Dave Guard, Bob Shane, and Nick Reynolds. It rose to international popularity fueled by unprecedented sales of LP records and helped alter the direction of popular music in the U.S.

The Kingston Trio was one of the most prominent groups of the era's folk-pop boom, which they kick-started in 1958 with the release of the Trio's eponymous first album and its hit recording of "Tom Dooley", which became a number one hit and sold over three million copies as a single. The Trio released nineteen albums that made Billboard's Top 100, fourteen of which ranked in the top 10, and five of which hit the number 1 spot. Four of the group's LPs charted among the 10 top-selling albums for five weeks in November and December 1959, a record unmatched for more than 50 years, and the group still ranks in the all-time lists of many of Billboard's cumulative charts, including those for most weeks with a number 1 album, most total weeks charting an album, most number 1 albums, most consecutive number 1 albums, and most top ten albums.

In 1961, the Trio was described as "the most envied, the most imitated, and the most successful singing group, folk or otherwise, in all show business" and "the undisputed kings of the folk-singing rage by every yardstick". The Trio's massive record sales in its early days made acoustic folk music commercially viable, paving the way for singer-songwriter, folk rock, and Americana artists who followed in their wake.

The Kingston Trio continues to tour as of 2026 with musicians who licensed the name and trademark in 2017.

== Formation, 1954–1957 ==
Dave Guard and Bob Shane had been friends since junior high school at the Punahou School in Honolulu, Hawaii, where both had learned to play ukulele in required music classes. They had developed an interest in and admiration for native Hawaiian slack key guitarists like Gabby Pahinui. While in Punahou's secondary school, Shane taught first himself and then Guard the rudiments of the six-string guitar, and the two began performing at parties and in school shows doing an eclectic mix of Tahitian, Hawaiian, and calypso songs.

After graduating from high school in 1952, Guard enrolled at Stanford University while Shane matriculated at nearby Menlo College. At Menlo, Shane became friends with Nick Reynolds, a native San Diegan with an extensive knowledge of folk and calypso songs—in part from his guitar-playing father, a career officer in the U.S. Navy. Reynolds was also able to create and sing tenor harmonies, a skill derived in part from family singalongs, and could play both guitar and bongo and conga drums. Shane and Reynolds performed at fraternity parties and luaus for a time, and eventually Shane introduced Reynolds to Guard. The three began performing at campus and neighborhood hangouts, sometimes as a trio but with an aggregation of friends that could swell its ranks to as many as six or seven, according to Reynolds. They usually billed themselves under the name of "Dave Guard and the Calypsonians". None of the three at that time had any serious aspirations to enter professional show business, however, and Shane returned to Hawaii following his graduation in late 1956 to work in the family sporting goods business.

Still in the Bay Area, Guard and Reynolds had organized themselves somewhat more formally into an entity named "The Kingston Quartet" with friends bassist Joe Gannon and vocalist Barbara Bogue, though as before the members were often joined in their performances by other friends. At one engagement at Redwood City's Cracked Pot beer garden, they met a young San Francisco publicist named Frank Werber, who had heard of them from a local entertainment reporter. Werber liked the group's raw energy but did not consider them refined enough to want to represent them as an agent or manager at that point, though he left his telephone number with Guard.

Some weeks later (and following a brief period in which Reynolds was temporarily replaced in the quartet by Don MacArthur), Guard and Reynolds invited Werber to a performance of the group at the Italian Village Restaurant in San Francisco, where Werber was so impressed by the group's progress that he agreed to manage them provided they replace Gannon, in whose professional potential Werber had no faith. Bogue left with Gannon, and Guard, Reynolds, and Werber invited Shane to rejoin the now more formally organized band. Shane, who had been performing part-time as a solo act at night in Honolulu, readily assented and returned to the mainland in early March 1957.

The four drew up a contract as equal partners in Werber's office in San Francisco, deciding on the name "Kingston Trio" because it evoked, through its association with Kingston, Jamaica, the calypso music popular at the time, and on the uniform of three-quarter-length sleeved vertically striped shirts that the group hoped would help its target audience of college students to identify with them.

== Era of peak success, 1957–61 ==
Werber imposed a stern training regimen on Guard, Shane, and Reynolds, rehearsing them for six to eight hours a day for several months, sending them to prominent San Francisco vocal coach Judy Davis to help them learn to preserve their voices, and working on the group's carefully prepared but apparently spontaneous banter between songs. At the same time, the group was developing a varied and eclectic repertoire of calypso, folk, and foreign language songs, suggested by all three of the musicians though usually arranged by Guard with some harmonies created by Reynolds.

The first major break for the Kingston Trio came in late June 1957 when comedian Phyllis Diller canceled a week-long engagement at The Purple Onion club in San Francisco. When Werber persuaded the club's owner to give the untested Trio a chance, Guard sent out five hundred postcards to everyone that the three musicians knew in the Bay Area and Werber plastered the city with handbills announcing the engagement. When the crowds came, the Trio had been well prepared by months of work, and they achieved such local popularity that the initial week's engagement stretched to six months. Werber built upon this initial success, booking a national club tour in early 1958 for the Trio that included engagements at such prominent night spots as Mister Kelly's in Chicago, the Village Vanguard in New York, Storyville in Boston, and finally a return to San Francisco and its showcase nightclub, the hungry i, in June of that year.

At the same time, Werber was attempting to leverage the Trio's popularity as a club act into a recording contract. Both Dot Records and Liberty Records expressed some interest, but each proposed to record the Trio on 45 rpm (revolutions per minute) singles only, whereas Werber and the Trio members both felt that 33 1/3 rpm albums had more potential for the group's music. Through Jimmy Saphier, agent for Bob Hope who had seen and liked the group at The Purple Onion, Werber contacted Capitol Records, which dispatched prominent producer Voyle Gilmore to San Francisco to evaluate the Trio's commercial potential. On Gilmore's strong recommendation, Capitol signed the Kingston Trio to an exclusive seven-year deal.

The group's first album, Capitol T996 The Kingston Trio, was recorded over a three-day period in February 1958 and released in June that year, just as the Trio was beginning its engagement at the hungry i. Gilmore had made two important supervisory decisions as producer — first, to add the same kind of "bottom" to the Trio's sound that he had heard in live performance and consequently recruiting Purple Onion house bassist Buzz Wheeler to play on the album, and second to record the group's songs without the supporting orchestral accompaniment that was nearly universal (even for folk-styled records) at the time. The song selections on the first album reflected the repertoire that the musicians had been working on for two years—re-imagined traditional songs inspired by The Weavers like "Santy Anno" and "Bay of Mexico", calypso-flavored tunes such as "Banua" and "Sloop John B" that were reminiscent of the popular Harry Belafonte recordings of the time, and a mix of both foreign language and contemporary songwriter numbers, including Terry Gilkyson's "Fast Freight" and "Scotch and Soda", whose authorship remains unknown as of 2023.

The album sold moderately well—including on-site sales at the hungry i during the Kingston Trio's engagement there through the summer—but it was DJs Paul Colburn and Bill Terry at station KLUB in Salt Lake City whose enthusiasm for a single cut on the record spurred the next development in the group's history. Colburn began playing "Tom Dooley" extensively on his show, prompting a rush of album sales in the Salt Lake area by fans who wanted to listen to the song, as yet unavailable as a single record. Colburn called other DJs around the country urging them to do the same, and national response to the song was so strong that a reluctant Capitol Records finally released the tune as a 45 rpm single on August 8, 1958; it reached the number 1 spot on the Billboard chart by late November, sold a million copies by Christmas, and was awarded a gold record on January 21, 1959. "Tom Dooley" also spurred the debut album to a number 1 position on the charts and helped the band earn a second gold record for the LP, which remained charted on Billboard's weekly reports for 195 weeks.

"Tom Dooley" (1958)
The non-orchestrated acoustic sound of this hit record, which has been recognized as a seminal recording in the history of American popular music by the National Recording Registry

The success of the album and the single earned the Kingston Trio a Grammy Award for Best Country & Western Performance for "Tom Dooley" at the awards' inaugural ceremony in 1959. At the time, no folk music category existed. The next year, largely as a result of The Kingston Trio and "Tom Dooley", the National Academy of Recording Arts and Sciences instituted a folk category and the Trio won the first Grammy Award for Best Ethnic or Traditional Folk Recording for its second studio album At Large.

This was the beginning of a remarkable three-year run for the Trio in which its first five studio albums achieved number 1 chart status and were awarded gold records. By 1961, the group had sold more than eight million records, earning in excess of US$25 million for Capitol, roughly US$270 million in 2025 dollars. The Kingston Trio was responsible for 15 percent of Capitol's total sales when Capitol recorded many other popular artists, including Frank Sinatra and Nat "King" Cole. For five consecutive weeks in November and December 1959, four Kingston Trio albums ranked in the top ten of Billboard's Top LPs chart, an accomplishment unmatched by any artist before or since. The Trio also charted several single records during this time, made numerous television appearances, and played upwards of 200 engagements per year.

== Change and a second phase, 1961–67 ==
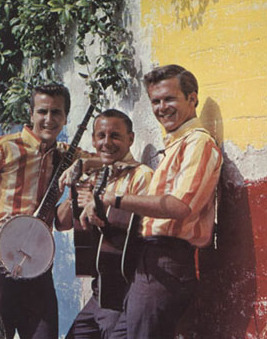
The Kingston Trio's second troupe after Guard's departure: John Stewart, Nick Reynolds, Bob Shane (summer 1963)

By early 1961 a rift developed and deepened between Guard on one side and Shane and Reynolds on the other. Guard had been referred to in the press and on the albums' liner notes as the "acknowledged leader" of the group, a description never wholly endorsed by Shane and Reynolds, who felt themselves equal contributors to the group's repertoire and success. Guard wanted Shane and Reynolds to follow his lead and learn more of the technical aspects of music and to redirect the group's song selections, in part because of the withering criticism that the group had been getting from more traditional folk performers for the Trio's smoother and more commercial versions of folk songs and for the money-making copyrights that the Kingston group had secured for its arrangements of public domain songs. Shane and Reynolds felt that the formula for song selection and performance that they had painstakingly developed still served them well.

Furthermore, over $100,000 appeared to be missing from the Trio's publishing royalties, an accounting error eventually rectified, which created an additional irritant to both sides. Guard regarded it as inexcusable carelessness while to Shane and Reynolds it highlighted what they perceived as Guard's propensity to claim individual copyright for some of the group's songs, including "Tom Dooley" (though Guard eventually lost a suit over copyright for that number to Alan Lomax, Frank Warner, and Frank Proffitt) and "Scotch and Soda".

Following a meeting with attorneys on May 10, 1961, intended to resolve the dispute, Dave Guard resigned from the Kingston Trio, though pledging to fulfill group commitments through November of that year. Shane, Reynolds, and Werber bought out Guard's interest in the partnership for $300,000 to be paid over a number of years and moved to replace him immediately. The remaining Trio partners settled quickly on John Stewart, a 21-year-old member of the Cumberland Three, one of the many groups that sprang up hoping to imitate the Kingston Trio's success. Stewart was well-acquainted with Reynolds and Shane, having sold two songs to the Trio, and he was a proficient guitarist, banjoist, and singer. Stewart began rehearsing and recording with the group nearly immediately, commencing public appearances with the Trio in September 1961.

According to Shane, "We did nearly as well with John as we did with Dave." Six of the group's next seven albums between 1961 and 1963 continued to place in Billboard's Top Ten and several of the group's most successful singles, including "Where Have All the Flowers Gone?" and "Greenback Dollar", charted as well.

"Greenback Dollar" (1962)
The second troupe of the Kingston Trio with John Stewart: altered vocal blend as the group moves away from adapted traditional songs and into singer-songwriter covers.

Beginning in 1964, however, the Kingston Trio's dominance in record sales and concert bookings began to wane, due partly to imitators in the pop-folk world and to the rise of other commercial folk groups like Peter, Paul and Mary whose music had a decidedly more political bent than the Trio's. The British Invasion spearheaded by The Beatles, who were signed by EMI/Capitol just as the Trio's seven-year contract was running out, depressed sales of acoustic folk albums significantly, and Capitol did not make a serious effort to re-sign the group. According to critic Ken Barnes, the British Invasion played a significant role in curtailing the sales of the Trio's recordings, one of the few bands that could legitimately and entirely blame the Invasion for their downfall.

Werber secured a generous signing bonus from Decca Records, and the last four albums of the Kingston Trio's first decade were released by that label. Without the production facilities of Capitol, however, and the expertise of Voyle Gilmore and engineer Pete Abbott, the Decca releases lacked the aural brilliance of the Capitol albums, and none of the four sold especially well.

By 1966, Reynolds had grown weary of touring and Stewart wanted to strike out on his own as a singer-songwriter, so the three musicians and Werber developed an exit strategy of playing as many dates as possible for a year with an endpoint determined to be a final two-week engagement at the hungry i in June 1967. The group followed this strategy successfully, and on June 17, 1967, the Kingston Trio ceased to be an actively performing band.

== Hiatus and the New Kingston Trio, 1967–1976 ==
Following the hungry i engagement, Reynolds moved to Port Orford, Oregon and pursued interests in ranching, business, and race cars for the next twenty years. Stewart commenced a long and distinguished career as a singer-songwriter, composing hit songs like "Daydream Believer" recorded by The Monkees and "Runaway Train" by Rosanne Cash. He recorded more than 40 albums of his own, most notably the landmark California Bloodlines, and found chart success in the top forty with "Midnight Wind", "Lost Her in the Sun", and "Gold", the latter reaching number 5 in 1979.

Bob Shane decided to stay in entertainment, and he experimented with solo work. He recorded several singles, including a well-received but under-marketed version of the song "Honey" that later became a million-seller for Bobby Goldsboro, and with different configurations with other folk-oriented performers. Though finances were not an immediate concern—the Kingston Trio partners Werber, Shane and Reynolds still owned an office building, a restaurant, other commercial real estate, and a variety of other lucrative investments—Shane wanted to return to a group environment and in 1969 secured permission from his partners to use the mutually owned group name for another band, with Reynolds and Werber insisting only that Shane's group be musically as accomplished as its predecessors and that Shane prefix "new" to the band's title.

Shane agreed and organized two troupes under the name of "The New Kingston Trio". The first consisted of guitarist Pat Horine and banjoist Jim Connor in addition to Shane and lasted from 1969 to 1973, the second including guitarist Roger Gambill and banjoist Bill Zorn from 1973 until 1976. Shane tried to create a repertoire for these groups that included both the older and expected Kingston Trio standards like "Tom Dooley" and "M.T.A." but that would also feature more contemporary songs as well, including country and novelty tunes. The attempt did not meet with any significant success. The only full-length album released by either group was The World Needs a Melody in 1973 (though 25 years later FolkEra Records issued The Lost Masters 1969–1972, a compilation of previously unreleased tracks from the Shane-Horine-Connor years), and its sales were negligible. Though both troupes of the New Kingston Trio made a limited number of other recordings and several television appearances, neither generated very much interest from fans or the public at large.

== The third phase, 1976–2017 ==
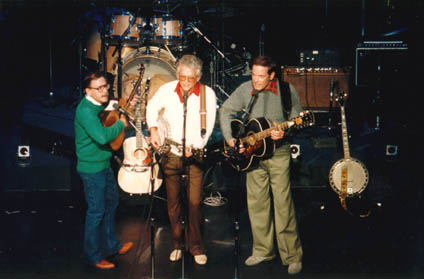
The 1981 Reunion Concert: Nick Reynolds, Bob Shane, Dave Guard

In 1976, Bill Zorn left the New Kingston Trio to work as a solo performer and record producer in London. Shane and Gambill replaced him with George Grove, a professionally trained singer and instrumentalist from North Carolina who had been working in Nashville as a studio musician.

The same year, Shane secured from Werber and Reynolds the unencumbered rights to use the band's original name of the Kingston Trio without the appended "new" in exchange for relinquishing his interest in the still-profitable corporation, whose holdings included copyrights and licensing rights to many of the original Trio's songs. Since 1976, the various troupes owned by Shane have performed and recorded simply as the Kingston Trio.

The Shane-Gambill-Grove Kingston Trio existed from 1976 through 1985, when Gambill died unexpectedly from a heart attack on March 2 at the age of 42. The nine years of this configuration was to that point the longest period of time that any three musicians had worked together as the Kingston Trio, and the group released two albums of largely original material.

It was during this period as well that PBS producers JoAnne Young and Paul Surratt approached Shane and the other principals of the original group with the idea of arranging a reunion concert that would be taped and used as a fundraiser for the network. Agreement was reached, and on November 7, 1981, Dave Guard, Nick Reynolds, and John Stewart joined the Shane-Gambill-Grove Trio and guest performers Mary Travers of Peter, Paul and Mary, Tom Smothers of the Smothers Brothers, and Lindsey Buckingham of Fleetwood Mac at the Magic Mountain amusement park north of Los Angeles for a show billed as "The Kingston Trio and Friends Reunion." The different configurations of the Trio took turns performing sets of the group's best-known songs with all the artists joining onstage for a finale.

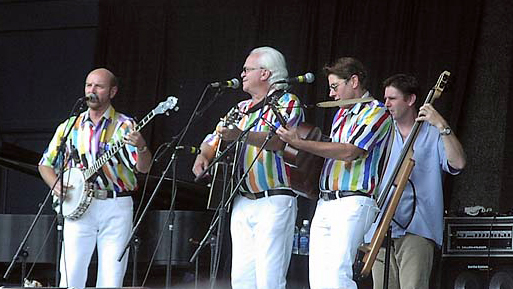
The Kingston Trio in 2003: George Grove, Bob Shane, Bobby Haworth (bassist Paul Gabrielson).

More than twenty years had passed since Dave Guard had left the group, but residual tension surfaced between Guard and Shane in a preview article in The Wall Street Journal that appeared in March 1982 in advance of the national broadcast of the taped show. Guard implicitly disparaged Shane's current group, and Shane asserted a distaste for performing again with Guard, who had spent the intervening decades living and performing in Australia, touring sporadically as a soloist, and writing about and teaching music. Despite the unpleasantness, Shane and Guard reconciled to a large degree (even to the point of planning a possible reunion tour) prior to Guard's death at age 56 from lymphoma nine years later in March 1991.

Following the 1985 death of Roger Gambill, Kingston Trio personnel changed several times, though Shane and Grove remained constants. Bob Haworth, a veteran folk performer who had worked as a member of The Brothers Four for many years, initially replaced Gambill from 1985 through 1988 and again from 1999 through 2005. In 1988, original member Nick Reynolds rejoined the band until his final retirement in 1999. When heart disease forced Bob Shane's retirement from touring in March 2004, he was replaced by former New Kingston Trio member Bill Zorn. A year later, following Haworth's departure, Grove and Zorn were joined by Rick Dougherty, who had performed for a time with Zorn as second-generation members of another popular folk group from the 1960s, The Limeliters.

Both the Grove–Zorn–Haworth and Grove–Zorn–Dougherty troupes of the Kingston Trio released original CDs and DVDs, and the latter configuration toured extensively for 12 years under the direction of original member Bob Shane. Capitol Records, Decca Records, Collector's Choice Music, and Folk Era Records have released and continue to release compilations of older albums as well as previously unreleased tapes of both studio and live recordings from the Kingston Trio's first ten years.

== Trademark and roster changes, 2017 to the present ==
In October 2017, Grove, Zorn, and Dougherty were replaced as the Trio by new licensees Josh Reynolds (son of original Kingston Trio founder Nick Reynolds), Mike Marvin, a close childhood friend of the Reynolds family, and Tim Gorelangton. In 2018, Josh Reynolds left the group and was replaced by Bob Haworth, who became a member of the band for the third time. At the end of 2018, Haworth left the group and was replaced by another former Limeliter, Don Marovich. Marovich resigned from the group in early 2022 and was replaced by Americana artist Buddy Woodward. In January 2026, Woodward left the Trio and was replaced by veteran folk performer Paul Robinson.

Bob Shane, the last original member of the trio, died on January 20, 2020. George Grove and Rick Dougherty continue to perform folk music by joining veteran entertainer Jerry Siggins as the Folk Legacy Trio.

== Members ==
=== The Kingston Trio ===
Current members

- Mike Marvin (2017–present) – vocals, guitar, plectrum banjo
- Tim Gorelangton (2017–present) – vocals, guitar, banjo
- Paul Robinson (2026–present) – vocals, tenor guitar

Former members

- Bob Shane – vocals, guitar, plectrum banjo (1957–1967, 1976–2004; died 2020)
- Nick Reynolds – vocals, tenor guitar, percussion (1957–1967, 1981, 1988–1999; died 2008)
- Dave Guard – vocals, guitar, banjo (1957–1961, 1981; died 1991)
- John Stewart – vocals, banjo, guitar (1961–1967, 1981; died 2008)
- Roger Gambill – vocals, guitar (1976–1985; died 1985)
- George Grove – vocals, banjo, guitar (1976–2017)
- Bob Haworth (1985–1988, 1999–2005) – vocals, guitar, plectrum banjo
- Bill Zorn – vocals, guitar (2004–2017)
- Rick Dougherty (2006–2017) – vocals, guitar, tenor guitar, banjo
- Josh Reynolds (2017–2018) – vocals, tenor guitar
- Don Marovich (2018–2022) – vocals, tenor guitar, guitar
- Buddy Woodward (2022–2026) – vocals, guitar, tenor guitar, banjo

=== The New Kingston Trio ===
Former members

- Bob Shane – vocals, guitar (1969–1976)
- Jim Connor – vocals, banjo (1969–1973)
- Pat Horine – vocals, guitar (1969–1973)
- Roger Gambill – vocals, guitar (1973–1976; died 1985)
- Bill Zorn – vocals, banjo (1973–1976)
- George Grove – vocals, banjo (1976)

== Folk music label ==
=== Initial criticism ===
Almost from its inception, the Kingston Trio found itself at odds with the traditional music community. Urban folk musicians of the time (to whom Bob Dylan referred in Rolling Stone as "the left-wing puritans that seemed to have a hold on the folk-music community") frequently associated folk music with leftist politics and were contemptuous of the Trio's deliberate political neutrality. Peter Dreier of Occidental College observed that "Purists often derided the Kingston Trio for watering down folk songs in order to make them commercially popular and for remaining on the political sidelines during the protest movements of the 1960s." A series of scathing articles appeared over several years in Sing Out! magazine, a publication that combined articles on traditional folk music with political activism. Its editor Irwin Silber referred to "the sallow slickness of the Kingston Trio" and in an article in the spring 1959 issue Ron Radosh said that the Trio brought "good folk music to the level of the worst in Tin Pan Alley music" and referred to its members as "prostitutes of the art who gain their status as folk artists because they use guitars and banjos". Following the Trio's performance at the premier Newport Folk Festival in 1959, folk music critic Mark Morris wrote: "What connection these frenetic tinselly showmen have with a folk festival eludes me... except that it is mainly folk songs that they choose to vulgarize."

Frank Proffitt, the Appalachian musician whose version of "Tom Dooley" the Trio rearranged, watched their performance of his song on a television show and wrote in reaction, "They clowned and hipswung. Then they came out with 'This time tomorrow, reckon where I'll be/If it hadn't a' been for Grayson/I'd a been in Tennessee.' I began to feel sorty sick. Like I'd lost a loved one. Tears came to my eyes. I went out and bawled on the ridge." Proffitt had learned the song from his father and his grandmother, who had known Tom Dula and Laura Foster, the killer and the victim in the actual 1866 murder related in the song. Both Proffitt and fellow North Carolina musician Doc Watson sang the older version of the tune, which had "a lively mocking tempo... that retained some of the ghastliness and moral squalor of an actual murder", according to folk historian Robert Cantwell, who also notes that the Kingston Trio's version of the song omitted several verses from the traditional lyric. The slower, harmonized Trio version of the Dooley song and other traditional numbers struck Proffitt as a betrayal of "the strange mysterious workings which has made Tom Dooly [sic] live..." In 2006, folk traditionalist and influential banjo master Billy Faier remarked: "I hear and see very little respect for the folk genre" in their music and described the Trio's repertoire as "a mishmash of twisted arrangements that not only obscure the true beauty of the folk songs from which they derive, but give them a meaning they never had."

However, Trio members never claimed to be folksingers and were never comfortable with the label. The liner notes for the group's first album featured an observation from Dave Guard asserting that "We don't really consider ourselves folksingers in the accepted sense of the word..." Guard later told journalist Richard Hadlock in Down Beat magazine: "We are not students of folk music; the basic thing for us is honest and worthwhile songs that people can pick up and become involved in." Nick Reynolds added in the same article: "We don't collect old songs in the sense that the academic cats do... We get new tunes to look over every day. Each one of us has his ears open constantly to new material or old stuff that's good." Bob Shane remarked years later: "To call the Kingston Trio folksingers was kind of stupid in the first place. We never called ourselves folksingers... We did folk-oriented material, but we did it amid all kinds of other stuff. But they didn't know what to call us with our instruments, so Capitol Records called us folksingers and gave us credit for starting this whole boom."

=== 21st-century perspectives ===
Over the years, the Kingston Trio expanded its song selection beyond the rearranged traditional numbers, calypso songs, and Broadway show tunes that had appeared on its first several albums. In an obituary for Nick Reynolds (d. October 1, 2008), Spencer Leigh wrote in Britain's Independent on Sunday:

Looking at their repertoire now, it is apparent that the Kingston Trio was far more adventurous than is generally supposed. They introduced "It Was A Very Good Year" in 1961, later a standard for Frank Sinatra, and they were one of the first to spot the potential of English language versions of Jacques Brel's songs by recording "Seasons in the Sun" in 1963. They encouraged young songwriters including Hoyt Axton ("Greenback Dollar"), Rod McKuen ("Ally Ally Oxen Free", "The World I Used to Know") and Billy Edd Wheeler ("Reverend Mr Black"). Best of all, in 1962 they introduced listeners to one of the most poignant songs ever written, the anti-war ballad "Where Have All the Flowers Gone?" by Pete Seeger, formerly with the Weavers.

Further, Peter Dreier points out that "the group deserves credit for helping to launch the folk boom that brought recognition to older folkies and radicals like Woody Guthrie and Pete Seeger, and for paving the way for newcomers like Joan Baez, Bob Dylan and Phil Ochs, who were well known for their progressive political views and topical songs. By the time these younger folk singers arrived on the scene, the political climate had changed enough to provide a wide audience for protest music." Additionally, writing in the British daily The Guardian, also in an obituary for Reynolds, Ken Hunt asserted that "[the Kingston Trio] helped to turn untold numbers of people on to folk music... [T]hey put the boom in folk boom... They were the greatest of the bands to emerge after the McCarthy-era blacklisting of folk musicians and breathed new air into the genre."

== Influence ==
=== On folk and pop music ===
The Kingston Trio's influence on the development of American popular music has been considerable. According to music critic Bruce Eder writing for Allmusic.com:

In the history of popular music, there are a relative handful of performers who have redefined the content of the music at critical points in history—people whose music left the landscape, and definition of popular music, altered completely. The Kingston Trio were one such group, transforming folk music into a hot commodity and creating a demand—where none had existed before—for young men (sometimes with women) strumming acoustic guitars and banjos and singing folk songs and folk-like novelty songs in harmony. On a purely commercial level, from 1957 until 1963, the Kingston Trio were the most vital and popular folk group in the world, and folk music was sufficiently popular as to make that a significant statement. Equally important, the original trio—Dave Guard, Nick Reynolds, and Bob Shane—in tandem with other, similar early acts such as the Limeliters, spearheaded a boom in the popularity of folk music that suddenly made the latter important to millions of listeners who previously had ignored it.

Discussing his earliest musical influences in a 2001 Rolling Stone interview, Bob Dylan remembered:

There were other folk-music records, commercial folk-music records, like those by the Kingston Trio. I never really was an elitist. Personally, I liked the Kingston Trio. I could see the picture...the Kingston Trio were probably the best commercial group going, and they seemed to know what they were doing.

In his autobiography Chronicles, Dylan added: "I liked the Kingston Trio. Even though their style was polished and collegiate, I liked most of their stuff anyway."

In February 1982, Chicago Tribune writer Eric Zorn praised the Kingston Trio's impact on the popular music industry, claiming that "for almost five years, they overshadowed all other pop groups in America." He also noted that they "so changed the course of popular music that their impact is largely felt to this day."

Jac Holzman, co-founder of the originally folk-based Elektra Records, remarked that his formerly struggling company's new-found prosperity in the late 1950s resulted from "The Kingston Trio which has the ability to capture the interest of a large number of people who have never been conscious of folk music before. In this respect, the Kingston Trio has put us on the map." Even some staunch traditionalists from both the urban and rural folk music communities had an affinity for the Kingstons' polished commercial versions of older songs. In her memoir And A Voice To Sing With, singer and activist Joan Baez recalled that "Traveling across the country with my mother and sisters, we heard the commercial songs of the budding folk boom for the first time, the Kingston Trio's 'Tom Dooley' and 'Scotch and Soda.' Before I turned into a snob and learned to look down upon all commercial folk music as bastardized and unholy, I loved the Kingston Trio. When I became one of the leading practitioners of 'pure folk,' I still loved them..." Arthel "Doc" Watson of North Carolina, one of the most respected and influential musicians performing traditional music, remarked, "I'll tell you who pointed all our noses in the right direction, even the traditional performers. They got us interested in trying to put the good stuff out there—the Kingston Trio. They got me interested in it!"

=== On musicians ===
Among the many other artists who cite the Kingston Trio as a formative influence in their musical careers are comedian, actor, and banjo player Steve Martin, Lindsey Buckingham of Fleetwood Mac, singer-songwriter Paul Simon, Timothy B. Schmit of the Eagles, pioneering folk-rock artist Gram Parsons, Stephen Stills and David Crosby of Crosby, Stills, and Nash, The Beach Boys' Al Jardine, Big Brother and the Holding Company founding member Peter Albin, Denny Doherty of The Mamas and the Papas, banjo master Tony Trischka, pop groups ABBA and The Bee Gees, Jefferson Airplane founding members Marty Balin and Paul Kantner, Buffalo Springfield founding member Richie Furay, Byrds co-founder Gene Clark, roots musician and master mandolin player David Grisman, singer-songwriters Tom Paxton, Harry Chapin, Jimmy Buffett, Tim Buckley, Steve Goodman, Steve Gillette, Michael Smith (composer of "The Dutchman"), and Shawn Colvin, folk-rock group We Five co-founder Jerry Burgan, folk and rock musician Jerry Yester, rock photographer and Modern Folk Quartet musician Henry Diltz, and progressive jazz vocal group Manhattan Transfer.

The classic stage look of The Beach Boys from the early to late 1960s, blue and white striped button-down shirts with either black or grey pants, was inspired by the Kingston Trio.

=== On the music business ===
The guitar manufacturer C.F. Martin & Company has attributed the dramatic rise in demand for its instruments in the early 1960s in large part to the Kingston Trio's use of the company's guitars, which are featured prominently and without compensation on nearly all of their album covers. A Martin company press release in 2007 announcing a fourth Kingston Trio commemorative model guitar stated that

...The Kingston Trio changed everything about popular music—and the entire acoustic guitar industry along with it... It was the rise of the Kingston Trio that really established Martin as "America's Guitar"...The Kingston Trio wasn't just a musical group. It was a phenomenon, as influential in its time as The Beatles would become in theirs.

Satirist Tom Lehrer has acknowledged the Trio's pioneering of college concerts, observing that before the Kingstons "there was no real concert circuit...The Kingston Trio started all that," and in Time magazine, critic Richard Corliss asserted, "In my youth, they changed pop music, and me with it."

== Awards and honors ==
Grammy Awards

- 1959 Best Country and Western Recording – "Tom Dooley"
- 1960 Best Ethnic or Traditional Folk Recording – At Large

Grammy Hall of Fame Award

- "Tom Dooley" 1998

Grammy Lifetime Achievement Award

- Awarded December 2010

Vocal Group Hall of Fame

- Inducted in 2000

Hit Parade Hall of Fame

- Inducted in 2008

Library of Congress National Registry of Historically Significant Recordings

- "Tom Dooley" 2008

Billboard Awards

- Best New Singing Group 1958

== On Billboard's albums chart ==
All rankings are from "American Album Chart Records 1955–2001"

- Most Number 1 Albums: 5 for a Number 10 ranking
- Most Weeks Charting a Number 1 Album: 46 for a Number 5 ranking
- Most Weeks Charting an Album: 1,262 for a Number 10 ranking
- Most Top Ten Albums: 14 for a Number 9 ranking
- Most Consecutive Number 1 Albums: 4, tied for a Number 4 ranking
- Most Consecutive Top 40 Albums: 17, tied for a Number 6 ranking
- Most Total Weeks Albums Charted in One Year: 348 in 1961 for a Number 3 ranking; 284 in 1960 for a Number 6 ranking
- Most Weeks Charting An Album by Decade, 1960–69: 1089 for a Number 4 ranking
- Most Weeks With a Number 1 Album in a Calendar Year: 22 in 1960, tied for a Number 4 ranking; 18 in 1959, tied for a Number 7 ranking
- Most Consecutive Weeks at Number 1 Chart Position: 15, tied for a Number 8 ranking

== See also ==
- The Trident, a restaurant in Sausalito, offshoot of Trident Productions, the trio's production company with Frank Werber.
