= Our Lady of Good Voyage (Boston) =

Roman Catholic shrine in Boston, Massachusetts

- Seaport Shrine
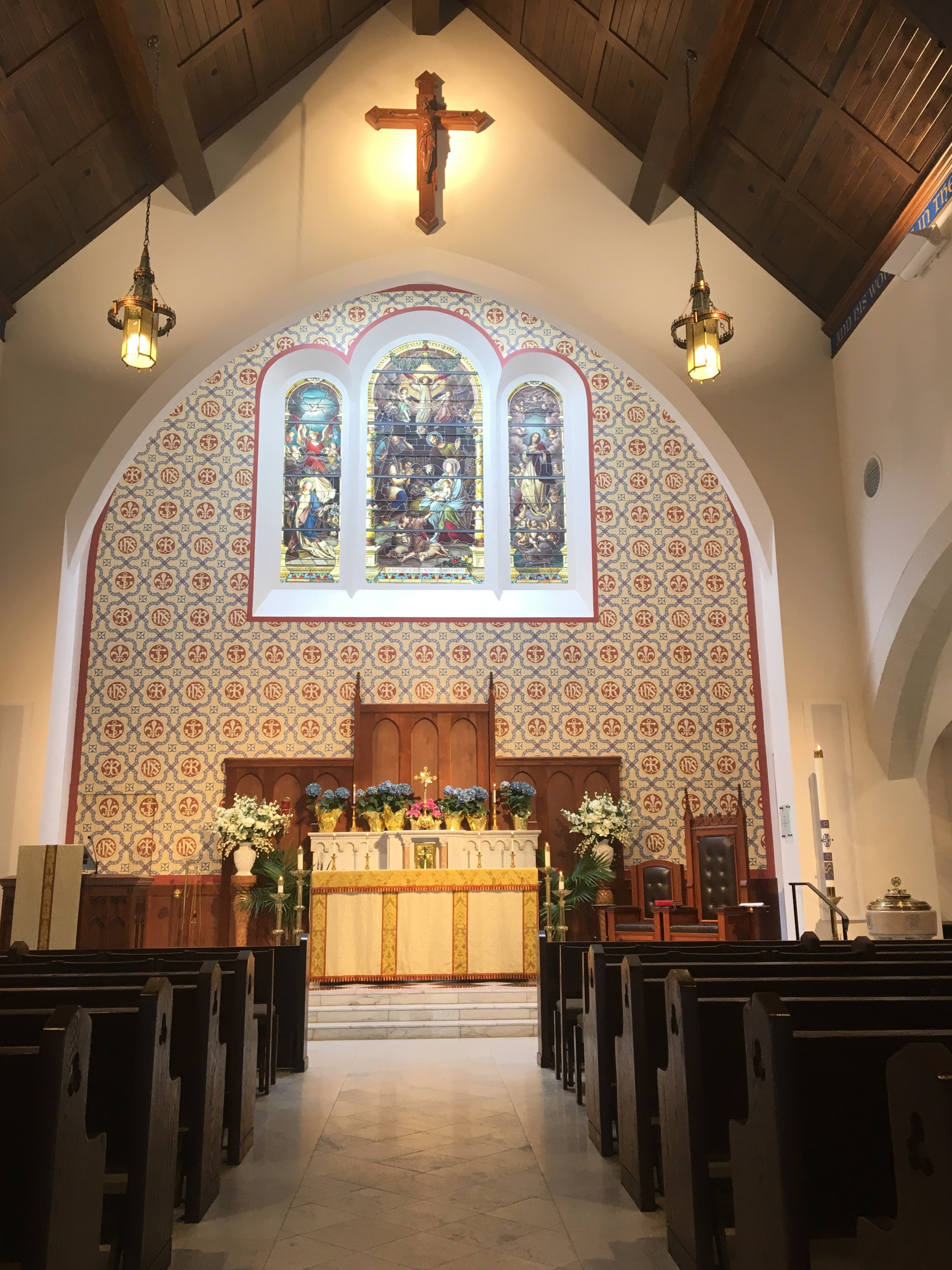

- Location in Boston, Massachusetts
- 42.353011°N 71.048534°W
- Location: 51 Seaport Boulevard; South Boston, Massachusetts
- Country: United States
- Denomination: Roman Catholic
- Website: seaportshrine.org

History
- Status: Church

Architecture
- Architect(s): Cram and Ferguson
- Style: Gothic Revival and modern
- Completed: 2017

Administration
- Archdiocese: Roman Catholic Archdiocese of Boston

Clergy
- Priest: Father Bryan Parrish

Our Lady of Good Voyage, also known as the Seaport Shrine, is a Roman Catholic church located at 51 Seaport Boulevard in the Seaport District of Boston and in the Archdiocese of Boston. The shrine has 250 seats and holds Mass twice daily and three times on Sundays. The original chapel was located a short distance away and was built to serve the fisherman and dockworkers in what was then an industrial neighborhood.

In 2017, a new church was constructed as part of a land swap deal with a developer who wanted to build on the location of the original chapel. Today, the Seaport Shrine serves as an apostolate of the Cathedral of the Holy Cross with a heavy focus on the young adults who live in the neighborhood. The new building, like the original, has a strong nautical theme.

== History ==
=== Original chapel ===
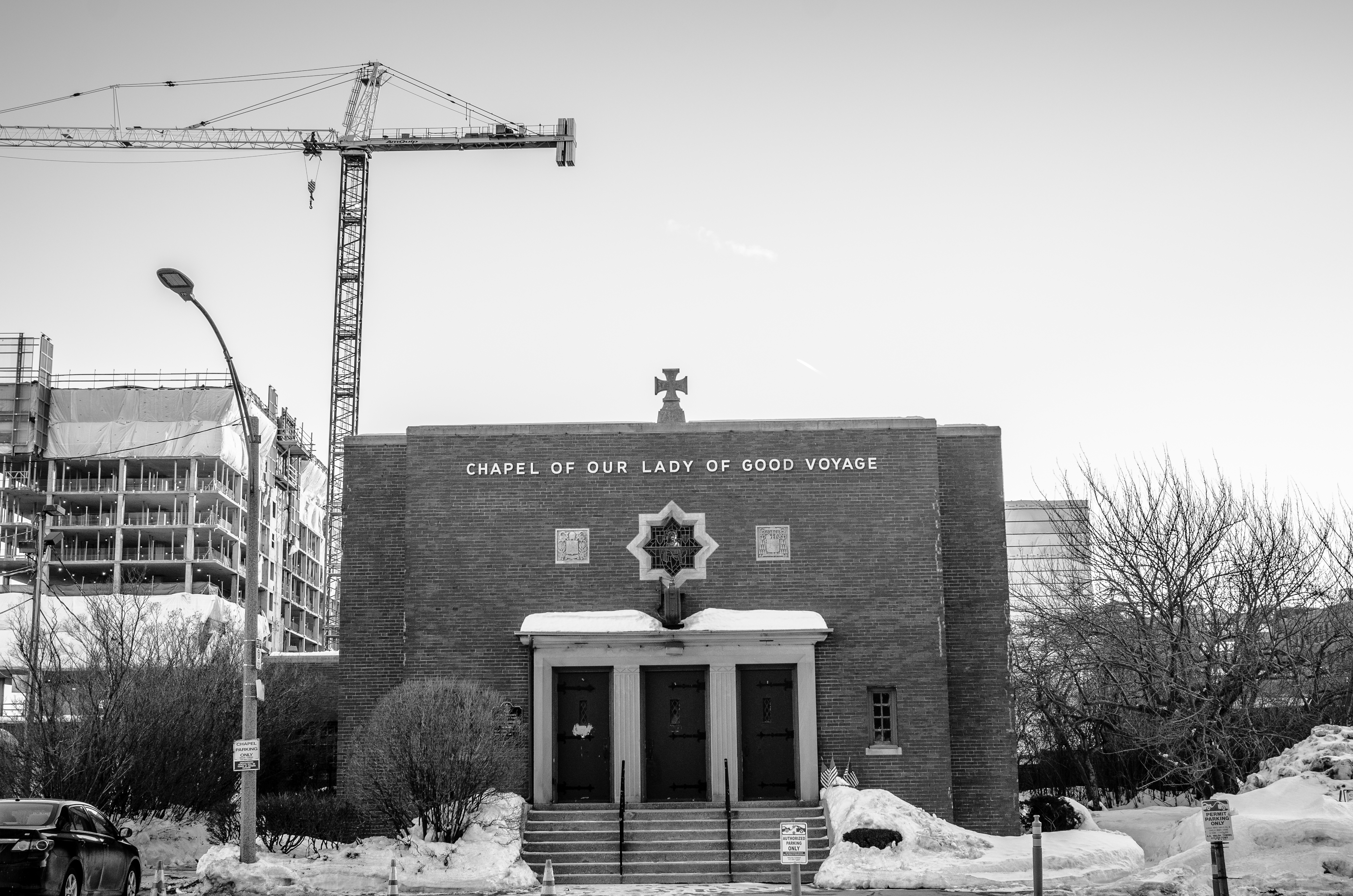
1952 chapel as it appeared in 2015

Seeing the growth of the fishing industry on the South Boston waterfront in the 1900s, Cardinal Richard Cushing established a chapel on Northern Avenue for fishermen, those who worked on the docks, in the nearby warehouses, and all those who worked at sea. The chapel was dedicated to the Blessed Virgin Mary under her title of Our Lady of Good Voyage on December 7, 1952, by Cushing during a vigil Mass for the Feast of the Immaculate Conception. The pastor of Our Lady of Good Voyage parish in Gloucester, Massachusetts, took part in the dedication, and donated a statue of Mary that stood in the chapel's entrance. The chapel cost $250,000 to build. The first director was Fr. John T. Powers.

The land for the chapel was donated by Frederic C. Dumaine, Jr. The chapel was a stout, brown brick building with a small stone cross above the front door, "good, thick doors" that were blue and the interior was painted blue and white

The interior featured a nautical theme. Replicas of boats including aircraft carriers and wooden sailing vessels adorned the chapel. Above the confessional was a polished hull, and the holy water font rested atop a wheelhouse throttle. The altar lamp was a miniature lighthouse. Originally there were clear pane windows, but eventually stained glass windows were added, with one depicting a sailor. Others showed maritime scenes from the New Testament, including Jesus preaching from a boat, the Apostles casting their nets, and Jesus calming the seas.

=== Early ministry ===
Special Masses were held at the chapel to commemorate the third anniversary of the death of Bobby Sands and the 23rd anniversary of the death of President John F. Kennedy. In the 1980s, Masses were frequently said for Irish republican causes, as well as for members of the Irish Republican Army who had died in The Troubles. In the early 2000s, a Mass was offered in Lithuanian.

As the chapel had the latest Sunday evening Mass in Boston, it was often referred to as "Our Lady of the Last Minute" by residents who scrambled to get there to meet their Sunday obligation. It was affiliated with St. Vincent de Paul parish in South Boston.

=== Land swap ===
In 2007, John B. Hynes III approached the Archdiocese about buying the property, which was getting run down. The archdiocese said they did not want to close the chapel and that they wanted to keep a presence in the Seaport. Hynes initially proposed giving them 5,000 square feet in an office building to construct a storefront church. As discussions went on, it was decided to build a new, freestanding church instead. A land swap deal between the developer and the church was then arraigned. A similar land swap was rumored to be in the works at the turn of the century between the Archdiocese and Frank McCourt, the developer who then owned the land, but nothing ever came of it. (Note: McCourt sold the land to Hynes in 2006.)

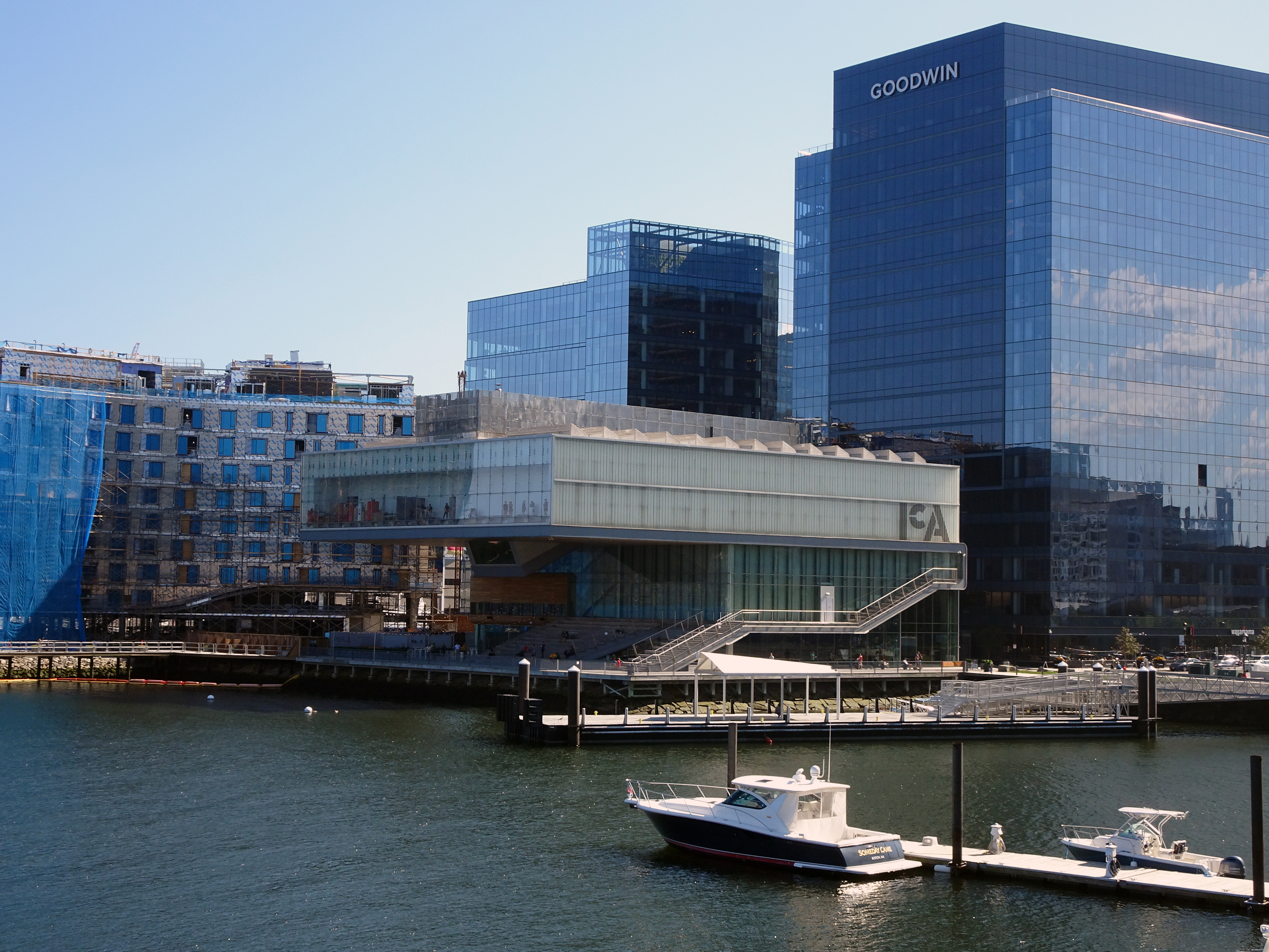
Neighborhood of Our Lady of Good Voyage

On October 22, 2015, the Archdiocese entered into a purchase and sale agreement with Boston Global Investors, Hynes' company, to sell the property upon which the original Our Lady of Good Voyage chapel was situated. The original chapel remained with the Archdiocese until the new shrine was completed. At that point, the original was demolished to make way for a 22-story office building in Seaport Square in what was called "the hottest, fastest-growing real estate market in the country."

Designing a new church that both looked like a Catholic church and also one that fit in with the sleek new neighborhood took three years of meetings with city officials and developers, including John B. Hynes IV, the project manager, who lived in the Seaport and often attended Mass there. City officials wanted a "museum-quality innovative design" to the building, but church officials wanted something more traditional, and the end result was a combination of both. The Archdiocese wanted the structure to have a steeple, but the city feared that it would dominate the skyline. A compromise was reached where a bell tower was constructed that is strong enough to one day hold a steeple.

The groundbreaking ceremony for the new shrine took place on November 21, 2014. The last Mass at the old shrine was held on Easter Sunday in 2017. It was originally hoped that the new shrine would be open by Christmas 2016, but Cardinal Sean Patrick O'Malley dedicated it on April 22, 2017, during the Vigil Mass of Divine Mercy. The dedication Mass was attended by Bishop John Dooher, Mayor Marty Walsh, Police Commissioner William B. Evans, and representatives of the Knights of Columbus and other Catholic organizations. It was the first new church built in the Archdiocese of Boston in 65 years.

== Ministry ==
The Shrine of Our Lady of Good Voyage is an apostolate of the Cathedral of the Holy Cross. The spiritual connection to the cathedral, home of the Chair of the Archbishop of Boston, demonstrates Cardinal O'Malley's desire that the Seaport Shrine become an important center for evangelization, and especially outreach and ministry to Millennials.

While the occupations of the people who work in the area are different today than what they were when the shrine first opened, it still exists to minister to workers. Many young professionals and empty nesters live and work in the area, and many of the region's poorest, including many immigrants, come to the Seaport District to work as cleaners and cooks in the hotels and office buildings. The shrine is designed to serve all of them and invite them to interact socially.

The archdiocese conducted demographic research into the neighborhood before building the new shrine to learn more about the 12,000 people between the ages of 18 and 32 who lived in South Boston at the time it was opened. As a result, a mission of the shrine is to encourage those who live and work in the area to use the shrine as a way to connect through community service.

According to City of Boston data, at least 100,000 people walk by the shrine each day. Mass is offered daily in the morning and at lunch with confession offered before and after each. The doors are open for people to walk in at least 12 hours every day and there is always a priest available to talk to anyone who wishes. Priests from Regina Cleri, the archdiocese's home for retired priests, assist at the shrine.

== Features of the shrine ==
The new shrine cost about $10 million to construct. The strong nautical themes throughout the church harken back to the days when it primarily served sailors and longshoremen, but the ship is also symbolic of the journey through life and one's own spiritual journey.

The new shrine's interior was designed by Ethan Anthony of Cram & Ferguson Architects in Concord and used repurposed windows and furnishings from the old chapel and from nearby parishes that were recently closed. The front of the balcony, the holy water fonts, the statue of Saint Joseph, and the pews all came from the former Holy Trinity parish. The organ came from Saint James in Wellesley. The confessional has a sliding screen so that the Sacrament of Reconciliation can be administered either face to face or anonymously.

=== Exterior ===
The exterior of the shrine was designed by ADD Inc. of Boston with a traditional A-frame style. Compared to the "oppulance of the Seaport Square development", the Boston Globe called it a humble building in contrast. The thin, 14 foot gold cross atop the bell tower was repurposed from the former parish of St. Mary Star of the Sea, Quincy, and the bell inside was crafted by The Verdin Company. When the cross was lifted on the tower, the workmen at all the construction sites in the area stood silently and removed their hardhats in reverence.

The brass ship's bell, which is 24 inches in diameter, was crafted with a high pitch to evoke the sounds of buoys and lighthouses. The front doors are made of gothic wood planks, and the wrought iron hinges incorporate themes of an anchor and a fish.

=== Sanctuary ===
The main altar comes from the former Holy Trinity church in the South End. The altar was hand carved by a father and son team in Italy. In the altar are first-class relics of Saint Elmo, the patron saint of sailors, Saint Anthony of Padua, and Saint Faustina Kowalska.

Behind the altar is wood paneling on the walls that was handmade by the Essential Furniture Company in the South American country of Colombia. This paneling also appears in the arches of the sanctuary. There is a large hand-carved wooden crucifix from Colombia hanging from the ceiling above the altar. In the ceiling of the sanctuary is a skylight with the Holy Spirit appearing as a dove etched into it.

In January 2019, stenciling was added to the wall behind the altar.

=== Nave ===
The wooden roof looks like the hull of a ship, recalling the "bark of St. Peter," a metaphor for the church. The church should be a refuge from the storms of life and a vessel that guides souls into Heaven. Hanging from the ceiling are chandeliers from the former Holy Trinity parish in the South End.

Between the windows are the Stations of the Cross that originally came from Regis College. On the four pillars are inscribed the names of the four rivers of the Garden of Eden: the Phison, Tigris, Euphrates, and Gehon. There is a choir loft. The Bose sound system is from Our Lady of Victories in Boston. At the top of the walls along the nave, Psalm 107:6, 23-24, 29 is written. In four buttresses of the church are compass roses, which are also Marian imagery.

The baptismal font has three panels showing an anchor, representing hope and Christ, a fish, representing the Eucharist, and a shell with flowing waters, representing baptism, new life, and pilgrimage.

=== Stained glass windows ===
In the center of the rose window above the front door is the Lamb of God. It came from St. Augustine's parish in South Boston. Surrounding the Paschal Lamb are eight newly commissioned windows, an octofoil, produced by Lyn Hovey Studios.

On the left side of the narthex there is an image of Our Lady of Good Voyage holding the Christ Child and a caravela. Mary's garments contain a fleur-de-lis, a symbol in Marian iconography. On the ship is the cross symbolic of Prince Henry the Navigator. On the right side is an image of St. Peter, a fisherman who is holding a scroll in his hands that says "Follow me and I will make you fishers of men." New England fishermen, for whom the shrine was originally established, have a long history of devotion to the fisherman of Galilee.

Above the two images of saints are the coat of arms of Pope Francis and O'Malley, the sitting pope and archbishop when the shrine was dedicated. Above the door is a nautical compass with a Marian image on top of it. Behind the compass, coats of arms, and saints is a diamond pattern reminiscent of a fishnet. Within the diamonds are small symbols of the sea and Christianity.

In the nave, the windows along the street side were repurposed from St. Catherine of Siena Parish in Charlestown. They include images of an angel, Saint Joseph, Saint Ann, Saint Anthony, Saint Joan of Arc, and another angel. The lower panel under each angel was changed, with the angel closest to the altar getting the arms of O'Malley, and the angel closest to the door getting those of the Archdiocese.

The windows on the alley side came from Holy Trinity Parish in the South End. As there is not enough natural light coming in through them, they are backlit with LED lights. They include images of Jesus with children, Saint Clare of Assisi, Saint Ignatius of Loyola, Jesus in the carpenter's shop, Saint Maria Goretti, and Christ the Good Shepherd. The image of Jesus with children is placed near the baptismal font and the image of the Good Shepard is near the confessional. All the windows retain the names of the original donors and they have all been restored by Lyn Harvey Studios of Boston.

The altar windows are also from St. Catherine's. In the center panel is the Nativity of Jesus. On the left is Annunciation, and on the right is the Assumption. There are air vents designed to look like the portholes on a ship.

=== Ships ===
Six wooden ships hang from the ceiling along the aisles, each of which has a connection to Boston and which represent the vessels of human lives. On the alley side of the church, they include the Boston Lightship, the Flying Cloud, and the Bluenose. On the street side of the church hangs the Malabar X, the USS Constitution, and the Atlantic.

=== Shrine within the shrine ===
Once inside the narthex, a small shrine enclosed by glass walls is off to the left. Inside is a hand-carved wooden statue depicting the Virgin Mary as Our Lady of Good Voyage. In one hand she holds the infant Jesus and, in the other hand, she holds a ship. The statue, which was originally placed in the old chapel, came from Oberammergau, a village in Germany known for producing religious art. The statue is a replica of one that can be found in the Gloucester church. Over the statue is the Prayer of Azariah, a quotation from the Book of Daniel: "Oh ye seas and rivers bless the Lord, bless and exalt him forever."

== See also ==
- List of churches in the Roman Catholic Archdiocese of Boston

== Works cited ==
- Our Lady of Good Voyage. Archdiocese of Boston. "This booklet has been published through the generous donation of John B. Hynes, III, Managing Partner at Boston Global Investors, in honor and memory of his grandfather, Mayor John B. Hynes, his father, Jack Hynes, and his mother, Marie Kelly Hynes. Mayor Hines was instrumental in founding the original Our Lady of Good Voyage in 1952. His son Jack hoped that this new Shrine would perpetuate the true mission of his Catholic faith to the thousands of new residents of Boston's emerging Seaport.".
