= 1949 Boston mayoral election =

Election in Massachusetts, United States

- November 8, 1949
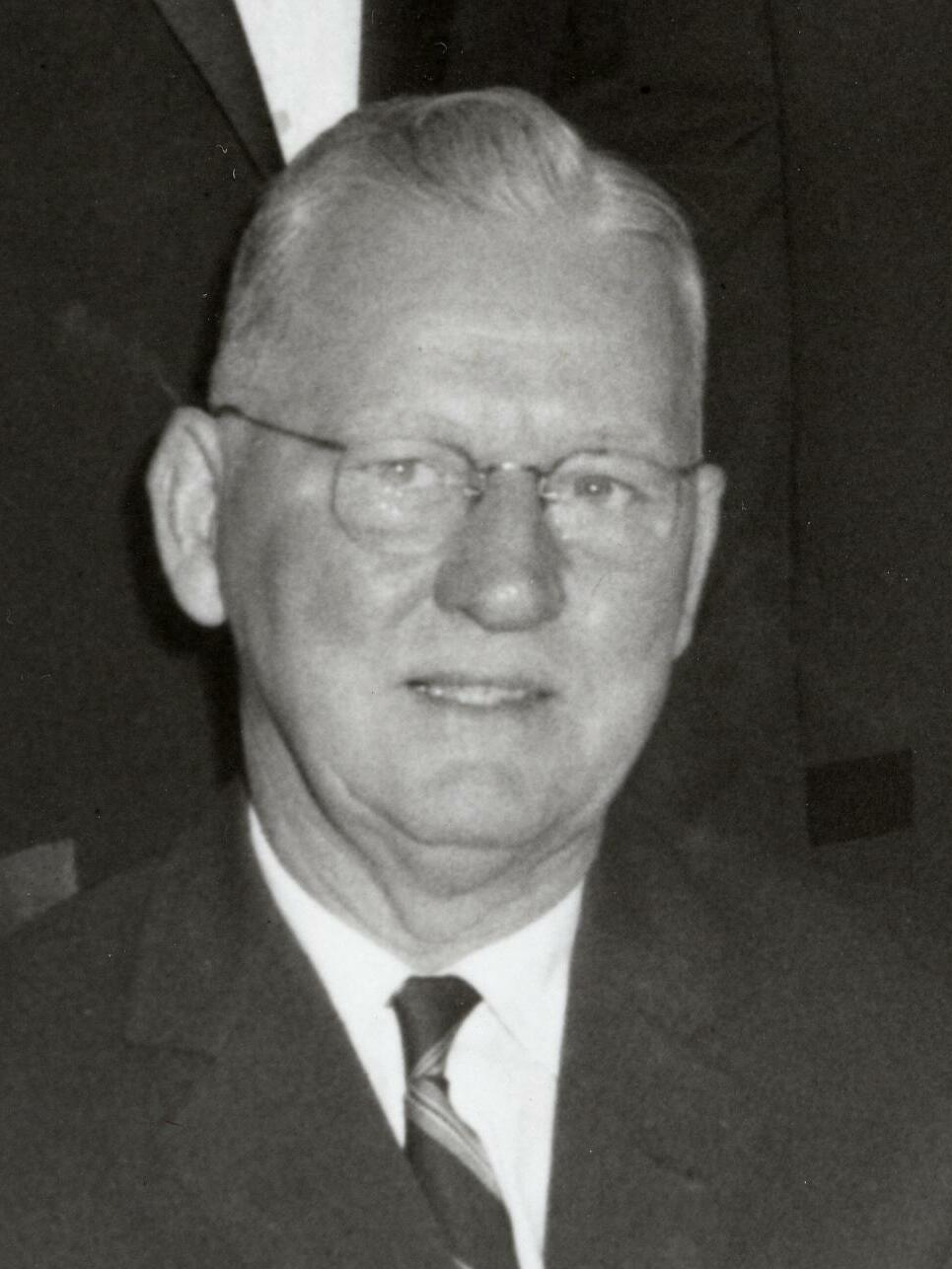

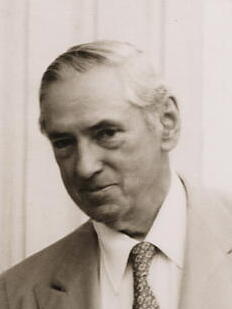

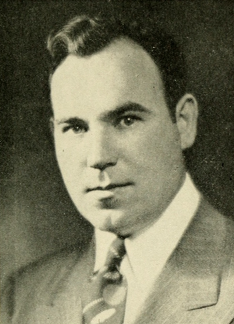
Candidate	John B. Hynes	James Michael Curley	Patrick J. McDonough
Party	Nonpartisan	Nonpartisan	Nonpartisan
Popular vote	137,930	126,000	22,230
Percentage	46.44%	40.40%	7.49%
Mayor before election
James Michael Curley
Elected mayor
John B. Hynes

The Boston mayoral election of 1949 occurred on Tuesday, November 8, 1949, between incumbent Mayor of Boston James Michael Curley, city clerk and former acting mayor John B. Hynes, and three other candidates. Hynes was elected to his first term.

Boston voters also approved changing the structure of future mayoral contests to include a preliminary election, to select two final candidates in advance of each general election. It also shifted the years in which elections would be held. The first such election was set for 1951, meaning that Hynes would only serve a two-year term, rather than a four-year term.

Hynes was inaugurated on Monday, January 2, 1950.

== Candidates ==
- James Michael Curley, Mayor of Boston from 1914 to 1918, 1922 to 1926, 1930 to 1934, and since 1946. Member of the United States House of Representatives from 1913 to 1914 and from 1943 to 1947. Governor of Massachusetts from 1935 to 1937. Member of the Massachusetts House of Representatives from 1902 to 1903.
- John B. Hynes, Boston City Clerk since 1946, Acting Mayor in 1947.
- Patrick J. McDonough, Member of the Massachusetts Governor's Council since 1947, member of the Massachusetts House of Representatives from 1941 to 1947.
- Walter A. O'Brien, Progressive Party politician. Commissioned M.T.A. as a campaign song.
- George F. Oakes, real estate businessman and former chairman of the Plan E for Boston Committee.

== Results ==
Candidates	General Election	
Candidates	Votes	%
John B. Hynes	137,930	46.44
James Michael Curley (incumbent)	126,000	40.40
Patrick J. McDonough	22,230	7.49
George F. Oakes	7,171	2.41
Walter A. O'Brien	3,659	1.23

=== Results by ward ===
Ward	Hynes		Curley		McDonough		Oakes		O'Brien	
Ward	Votes	%	Votes	%	Votes	%	Votes	%	Votes	%
1	4,655	29.08	9,311	58.16	1,619	10.11	272	1.70	153	0.96
2	2,518	27.76	5,739	63.26	636	7.01	117	1.29	62	0.68
3	4,489	30.87	8,486	58.36	1,059	7.28	258	1.77	249	1.71
4	5,695	54.21	3,888	37.01	364	3.46	376	3.58	183	1.74
5	8,980	67.58	3,307	24.89	389	2.93	401	3.02	211	1.59
6	2,442	24.90	5,487	55.94	1,663	16.96	162	1.65	54	0.55
7	4,383	31.56	6,889	48.97	2,499	17.76	203	1.44	94	0.67
8	2,670	28.22	6,091	64.37	482	5.09	146	1.54	73	0.77
9	2,827	27.32	6,517	62.98	596	5.76	256	2.47	152	1.47
10	4,553	36.34	7,124	56.86	527	4.21	269	2.15	57	0.45
11	4,532	39.23	5,953	51.54	593	5.13	358	3.10	115	1.00
12	6,319	48.31	5,081	38.85	861	6.58	318	2.43	501	3.83
13	4,978	43.20	5,206	45.18	1,091	9.47	189	1.64	58	0.50
14	10,038	53.84	6,071	32.56	1,536	8.24	238	1.28	762	4.09
15	4,953	42.14	5,317	45.23	1,233	10.49	206	1.75	46	0.39
16	8,556	54.17	5,327	33.72	1,558	9.86	277	1.75	79	0.50
17	8,882	58.56	4,861	32.05	1,016	6.70	301	1.98	108	0.71
18	9,776	54.06	5,901	32.63	1,306	7.22	993	5.49	107	0.59
19	7,492	54.50	5,215	37.93	488	3.55	498	3.62	55	0.40
20	12,016	65.41	4,947	26.93	671	3.65	566	3.08	171	0.93
21	10,037	63.51	4,524	28.62	564	3.57	431	2.73	249	1.58
22	7,139	51.24	4,758	34.15	1,399	10.04	336	2.41	120	0.86

== See also ==
- List of mayors of Boston, Massachusetts
