= John B. Hynes, III =

Founder and Ceo of Boston Global Investors

John B. Hynes, III is the founder, CEO, and Managing Partner of Boston Global Investors.

== Personal life ==
He is the son of Jack Hynes and the grandson of Mayor John Hynes. He has a son, John B. Hynes IV. He is married to Tracee Hynes and lives in South Boston. His cousin is Barry T. Hynes.

Hynes was graduated from Harvard College and co-captained the 1980 hockey team there. He doubts the dangers of climate change.

== Career ==
He worked for 10 years as the CEO and managing partner of Gale International where he was part of the master development team of New Songdo City in South Korea. He then left to found Boston Global Investors.

As "a major force in the metamorphosis of the Boston waterfront," Hynes negotiated the land swap deal that brought about the current Our Lady of Good Voyage Shrine and the Seaport Square. His Seaport District land deal in 2006, worth more than $200 million, was by far the most expensive in Boston history.
