= The Ship That Never Returned =

1865 sentimental ballad by Henry Clay Work

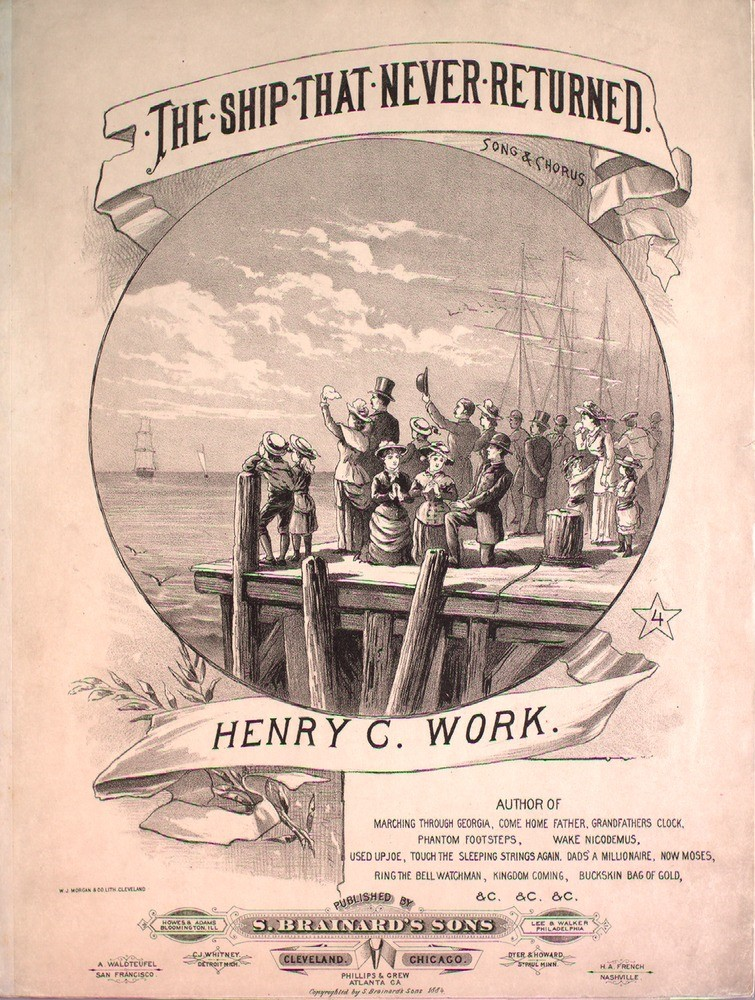
1884 sheet music cover, published by S. Brainard Sons

"The Ship That Never Returned" is a sentimental ballad written by Henry Clay Work in 1865. It was first published in September that year by Root & Cady, with whom Work had collaborated throughout the American Civil War. It narrates the departure of a ship from a harbor that never come back, with a mother and the captain's wife lamenting the loss of their loved ones who were on board.

The song melodically inspired later country tunes, including the 1903 ballad "Wreck of the Old 97", which was the first million-selling country music hit. The melody was also adapted in Walter A. O'Brien's 1948 campaign song "Charlie on the MTA".

== Background ==
An 1887 illustration of Work

Henry Clay Work partnered with the Chicagoan publishers Root & Cady throughout the American Civil War. Among the most popular wartime works, Work's songs generally express what Union citizens were feeling at the time. With the Civil War over, Work's motivation for songwriting and musical output declined considerably. As George Frederick Root writes in his memoirs, war songs quickly became outdated, and he settled into sentimental balladry. Melancholy hardly features in Work's wartime music, but "Little Major" (1863) suggested a turn toward sentimentality. His songs after the war focus on somber themes owing to the personal tragedies engulfing his later life, as Dean Nelson notes in a 2008 Connecticut Explored article: "... in his lyrics, children die, soldiers die, ships sink, love goes unreturned, poor folks starve, and the lonely remain so."

Newly enriched by his war efforts, Work embarked on a tour around Europe in 1865, during which he wrote the first of his postbellum songs, "The Ship That Never Returned". The folklorist Fannie Hardy Eckstorm suggests a source for Work's song given by an elderly man in Tatamagouche, Nova Scotia: that there was a vessel built in the village manned by a Captain Torrey, whom the man knew personally, and the captain was intent on sailing it one last time even "if he sailed her to [Hell]". No one heard from him again. She brings up a line from "The Wreck of the Old 97", commonly thought to stem from Work's song, that mirrors Torrey's vow: "'... But I'll put old Ninety-Seven into Spencer, North Carolina, / Or I'll sink her in the bottom pits of Hell." Further to this, according to Eckstorm's recollection, the captain's wife or girlfriend wrote "The Ship That Never Returned" in response to his tragedy, and all Work did was revise this version.

== Lyrics ==
According to Songs of Henry Clay Work, a compilation pieced by Work's nephew Bertram:

On a summer's day, when the wave was rippled
By the softest, gentlest breeze,
Did a ship set sail, with a cargo laden
For a port beyond the seas;
There were sweet farewells, there were loving signals
While a form was yet discern'd;
Though they knew it not, 'twas a solemn parting,
For the ship she never return'd.

CHORUS
Did she never return? She never return'd
Her fate, it is yet unlearn'd;
Tho' for years and years there were fond ones watching,
Yet the ship she never return'd.

Said a feeble lad to his anxious mother,
"I must cross the wide, wide sea;
For they say, perchance in a foreign climate
There is health and strength for me,"
'Twas a gleam of hope in a maze of danger,
And her heart for her youngest yearn'd;
Yet she sent him forth with a smile and blessing
On the ship that never return'd.

(CHORUS)

"Only one more trip," said a gallant seaman,
As he kiss'd his weeping wife;
Only one more bag of the golden treasure,
And 'twill last us all through life.
Then I'll spend my days in my cozy cottage,
And enjoy the rest I've earn'd;
But alas, poor man! for he sail'd commander
Of the ship that never return'd.

CHORUS
She never return'd
Her fate, it is yet unlearn'd;
Tho' for years and years there were fond ones watching,
Yet the ship she never return'd.

== Composition ==
The song performed by Vernon Dalhart and accompanying musicians in 1925

The song concerns a ship that left a harbor and never came back. A reason for the ship not returning is not given in the lyrics. However, the line "and their fate is yet unlearned" implies that the reason is unknown.

Eckstorm suggested in the Bangor Daily News that Work pilfered the first phrase of "Darling Nelly Gray" for his song's basic tune.

== Reception and influence ==
1866 sheet music cover, published by S. Brainard Sons

Spinoffs of "The Ship That Never Returned" started appearing by 1888. "The Train That Never Returned" is one of the early parodies of Work's song:

Did she never return? No, she never returned,
Though the train was due at one.
For hours and hours the watchman stood watching,
For the train that never returned.

Another is "The Wreck of the La Plata Special". The tune formed the basis of "Wreck of the Old 97", about a 1903 train wreck; recorded by Vernon Dalhart in 1924, and many others afterward, the song became the first million-selling country music hit. Eckstorm writes that "Old 97" constitutes a whole rewriting of "The Ship That Never Returned". In Eckstorm's thought, "Old 97" is the best of the spinoffs, while the rest are "weak parodies".

Carl Sandburg's collection American Songbag recorded an adaptation from the Kentucky mountains.

The melody was adapted in "Charlie on the MTA", created in 1948, as a campaign song for Walter A. O'Brien about a man unable to alight from a Boston subway train because, rather than change all the turnstiles, the M.T.A. added an exit fare – Charlie did not have the extra nickel to get off the train. The Kingston Trio, a folk group, recorded the song in 1959 (as "M.T.A.") and had a hit with the recording in the same year.

Eckstorm, writing in 1934, remarks that many folk artists had arranged the song anew, often tagging on a fourth verse and changing the wording; she thinks their efforts healed the original's poor melody and "sickly sentimental words". One example is E. M. Sullivan's 1933 adaptation:

She never returned, she never returned.
And her fate is still unlearned;
And for years and years kind friends are mourning
For the ship that never returned.

== Bibliography ==
- Birdseye, George (1879). "America's Song Composers: IV. Henry Clay Work". Potter's American Monthly. 12 (88): 284–288 – via Internet Archive.
- Bowman, Kent A. (1987). Voices of Combat: A Century of Liberty and War Songs, 1765–1865. Westport, Connecticut: Greenwood Press, Inc. ISBN 0-313-25408-7.
- Carder, P. H. (2008). George F. Root, Civil War Songwriter: A Biography. Jefferson, North Carolina: McFarland & Company, Inc. ISBN 978-0-7864-3374-2.
- Cockrell, Dale; Zinck, Andrew M. (2001). "Popular Music of the Parlor and Stage". In Koskoff, Ellen (ed.). The Garland Encyclopedia of World Music Volume 3: The United States and Canada. Vol. 3. New York City, New York: Garland Publishing, Inc. pp. 179–201.
- Cohen, Norm (2000). Long Steel Rail: The Railroad in American Folksong (2nd ed.). Chicago, Illinois: University of Illinois Press. ISBN 978-02520-6881-2.
- Ewen, David (1977). All the Years of American Popular Music. Englewood Cliffs, New Jersey: Prentice-Hall, Inc. ISBN 978-0-13-022442-2.
- Finson, Jon W. (1994). The Voices That Are Gone: Themes in Nineteenth-Century American Popular Song. New York City, New York: Oxford University Press. ISBN 0-19-505750-3.
- Hill, Richard S. (1953). "The Mysterious Chord of Henry Clay Work". Notes. 10 (2): 211–225. doi:10.2307/892874. JSTOR 892874.
- Flanders, Helen Hartness; Eckstorm, Fannie Hardy (January 6, 1934). "New England Folk Songs: The Ship That Never Returned". The Bangor Daily News. p. 4 – via Newspapers.com.
- Kelley, Bruce C.; Snell, Mark A. (2004). Bugle Resounding: Music and Musicians of the Civil War Era. Columbia, Missouri: University of Missouri Press. ISBN 0-8262-1538-6.
- Mancini, J. M. (2024). "Disaster Country: Henry Clay Work, Forgetting, and the Politics of American Popular Song". Massachusetts Historical Review. 2: 119–154. JSTOR 374718.
- McWhirter, Christian (2012). Battle Hymns: The Power and Popularity of Music in the Civil War. Chapel Hill, North Carolina: University of North Carolina Press. ISBN 978-0-8078-3550-0.
- Nelson, Dean (2008). "Marching with Henry C. Work". Museum of Connecticut History. Archived from the original on April 11, 2026.
- Randolph, Vance (1980). Ozark Folksongs. Vol. 4. Columbia, Missouri: University of Missouri Press. ISBN 0-8262-0300-0.
- Root, George F. (1891). The Story of a Musical Life: An Autobiography by Geo F. Root. Cincinnati, Ohio: The John Church Co. ISBN 978-1-4047-8329-4.
- Sadie, Stanley; Tyrrell, John, eds. (2001). The New Grove Dictionary of Music and Musicians. Vol. 27 (2nd ed.). New York City, New York: Macmillan Publishers. ISBN 1-56159-239-0.
- Scott, Alfred P. (1965). The Origins of a Modern Traditional Ballad, 'Wreck of the Old 97' (PDF) (Dissertation). Charlottesville, Virginia: University of Virginia. Archived (PDF) from the original on July 17, 2026.
- Shepherd, John (2003). Continuum Encyclopedia of Popular Music of the World. Vol. 1. New York City, New York: Continuum International Publishing Group. ISBN 0-8264-6321-5.
- Silber, Irwin (1995). Songs of the Civil War. Mineola, New York: Dover Publications. ISBN 0-486-28438-7.
- Spaeth, Sigmund (1948). A History of Popular Music in America. New York City, New York: Random House.
- Tribble, Edwin (1967). "'Marching Through Georgia'". The Georgia Review. 21 (4): 423–429. JSTOR 41396391.
- Work, Henry C. (n.d.). Work, Bertram G. (ed.). Songs of Henry Clay Work. New York City, New York: Little & Ives.
