= Exit fare =

Method of fare payment

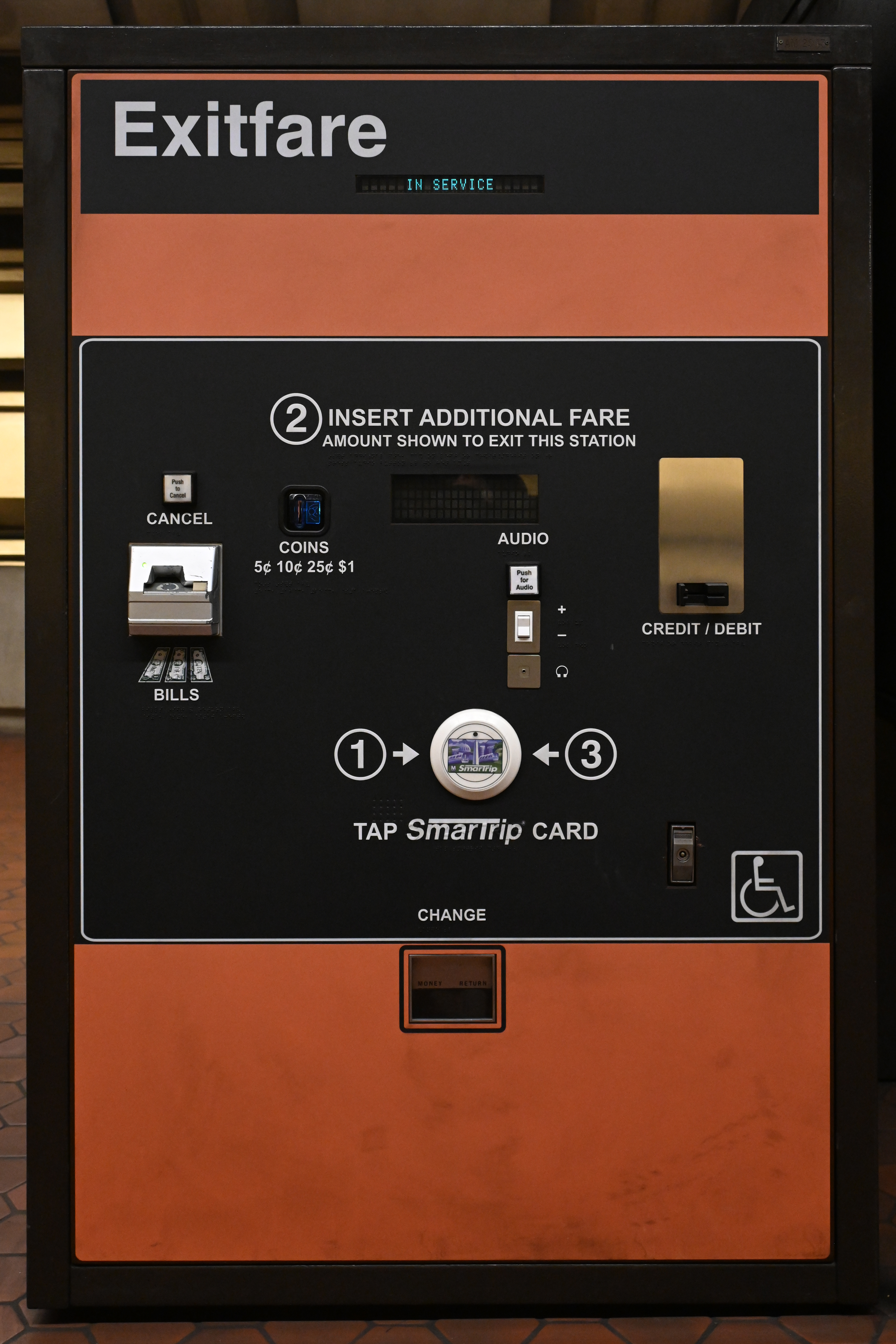
An exit fare machine at the Ballston-MU station of the Washington Metro

An exit fare is a method of collecting ridership fees, or fares, from a transportation system, where the fee (or part of the fee) is collected from passengers upon reaching their destination.

== Examples ==
Exit fares were used on the subway lines of the early MBTA in Boston, Massachusetts, as a cost-cutting method to be able to collect increased fares without having to upgrade fare collection equipment at station entrances. The perceived unfairness of this system (what to do with a passenger who can't pay the exit fare?) prompted Boston politician Walter A. O'Brien to commission the protest song "M.T.A.", which later became a hit song by The Kingston Trio. The last of the subway exit fares were eliminated from the Boston rail transit lines on December 4, 2006, with the implementation of the CharlieCard (its name a reference to the main character in the protest song). However, the MBTA's trackless trolley routes that used left-side boarding in the lower bus tunnel at Harvard station had exit fares because fares could not be collected during boarding. With the final two trackless trolley routes being converted to standard bus routes with boarding relocated to the upper bus tunnel at Harvard, exit fares were entirely eliminated from the MBTA system beginning March 13, 2022.

In New York City, this system is used on the AirTrain at John F. Kennedy International Airport. The system uses an exit fare to distinguish between intra-airport trips, which are free, and connections to the subway and commuter rail, which are not. A similar system applies at Orly Airport in Paris, where the Orlyval service is free of charge between the airport's terminals, but passengers alighting at Antony station need to pay.

The IND Rockaway Line charged a double fare south of Howard Beach Station which entailed the deposit of two tokens for those entering along the line or one token on exit for those arriving from other parts of the system. The unpopular double fare was abolished in 1975.

Exit fares are also charged on the Staten Island Railway at St. George Terminal and Tompkinsville station, because the primary function of the railway is to transport commuters on Staten Island to/from the Staten Island Ferry terminal at St. George. Commuters heading to Manhattan via the ferry pay upon exiting the train at St. George in the morning, and upon entry at St. George in the afternoon. Exit fares are charged at Tompkinsville because it is also within walking distance of the ferry terminal. Before exit fares were charged at Tompkinsville, one could avoid paying the exit fare at St. George by exiting at Tompkinsville and walking to the ferry terminal. By charging entry and exit fares at St. George and Tompkinsville, the other stations on the Staten Island Railway can be run at far lower cost, without any fare collection equipment or station employees present.

On the Washington Metro, riders process their SmarTrip cards for both entering and exiting the system. The fare is actually deducted from the rider's card upon exiting the system based on the time of day and distance traveled. Exitfare machines located near the fare gates allow riders to add additional value to their cards should they lack sufficient value to exit the station at that location.

Bay Area Rapid Transit also uses a similar fare-collecting method, based on distance but not time of day. On BART, while ticket vending machines outside the paid area accept credit and debit cards as well as cash, the Addfare machine inside the paid area, which must be used if the ticket has insufficient value, accepts cash only. Also, the Oakland Airport Connector charges exit fare for riders leaving the airport.

Prior to the fare system being overhauled in 2017, the Port Authority of Allegheny County (since rebranded as Pittsburgh Regional Transit) used exit fares to implement a free ride zone in downtown Pittsburgh. Riders going toward downtown (and on routes that did not enter downtown) paid on entry. Riders leaving downtown before 7 pm paid on exit. Riders traveling entirely within downtown did not pay at all. After 7 pm, no free rides were provided downtown and all trips were charged a fare upon entry. Metro Transit in King County, Washington, used a similar system until it was ended on September 29, 2012, as well as TriMet in Downtown Portland, Oregon from 1975 to 1982, when its Fareless Square went to pay on boarding, with transfers as a fare receipt for those leaving the area.

Many lower-volume point-to-point ticket-based transit services use exit fares in one direction, to avoid the expense of maintaining ticket offices at both ends of the line.
