= Johnny Jolin =

American singer

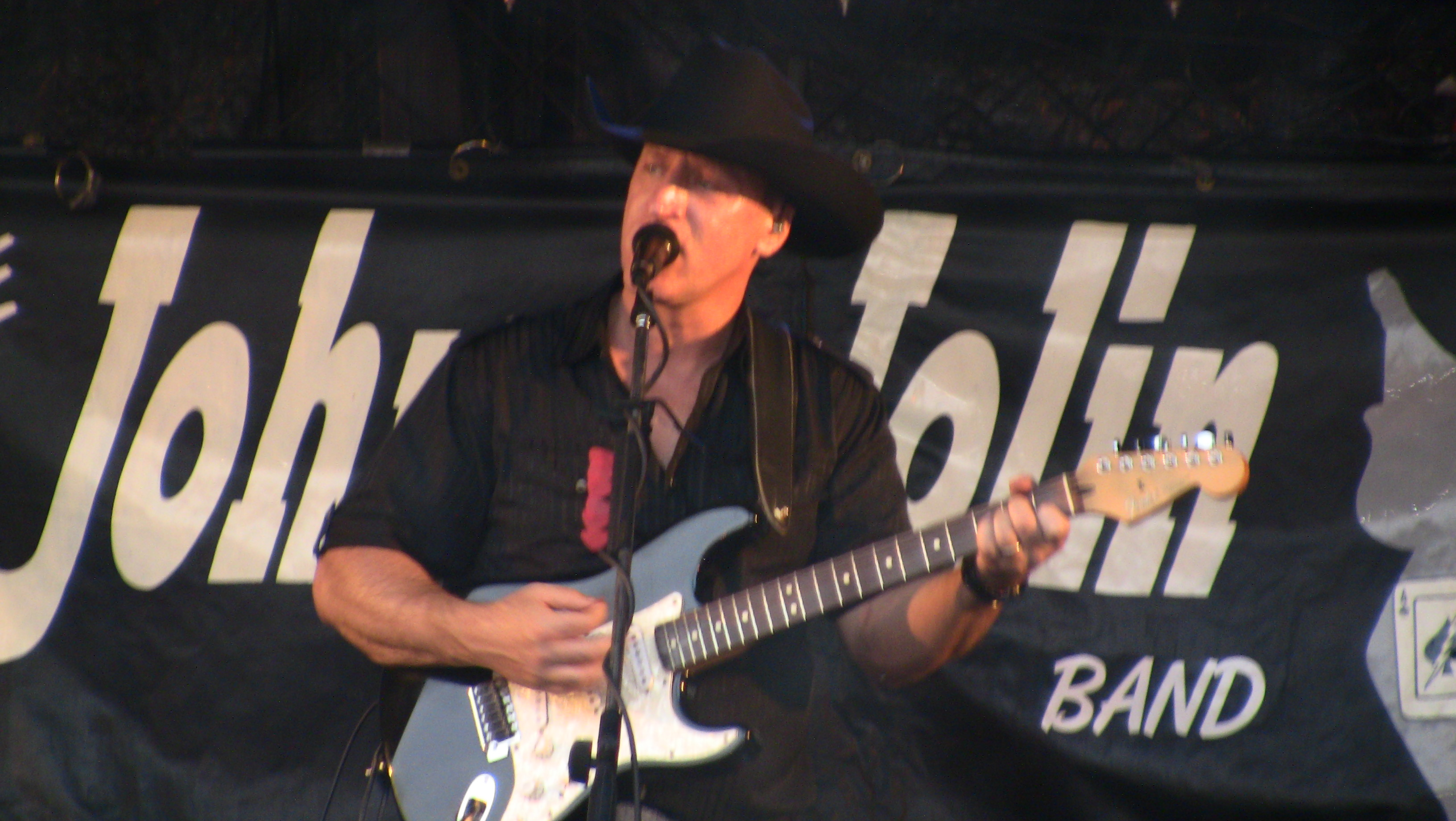

Background information
- Genres: Country; rock; gospel
- Occupation: Singer-songwriter
- Instruments: Vocals; guitar
- Years active: 1991–2012
- Formerly of: The Front Porch Country Band

Johnny Jolin is an American country music artist best known for his 2011 Top-Ten hit single "Thank God". He was one of the lead vocalist for Country/Folk group The Front Porch Country Band and the frontman of Johnny Jolin Band.

His career began after winning a talent search competition during his ten years of service in the U.S. Army. Before reaching "head-liner" status he spent his early days opening for many popular Nashville recordings artists of the 1990s including Confederate Railroad, Hank Williams III, David Lee Murphy, Ricochet, Jeff Carson, Mel McDaniel, Chely Wright and Steve Wariner. Hank Williams III deemed Jolin “The Eddie Van Halen of Country Music" because of his blend of guitar solos and country classics which also garnered him the title Rockin' Rollin' Johnny Jolin. He is known for his "raw, edgy vocal" and is sometimes compared to Country Music great John Anderson.

In April 2004 Johnny was invited by the US. China Foundation to do a two-week tour of Mainland China as front man of The Front Porch Country Band.

After heavy east coast touring, Jolin began receiving regional country radio airplay, which led to his popular self-penned live songs “Girl Like That” and “Bedroom Eyes” getting picked up by nationally syndicated Conman Radio.

On May 10, 2010, Johnny Jolin and the Front Porch Country Band opened for Randy Travis.

On June 17, 2010, Johnny Jolin signed with Nashville's LWM Records. The label's website states: "LWM Records is a co-venture between Living Wills Music (BMI) and country music star Johnny Jolin."

On April 9, 2011, he released his LWM Records debut single "Thank God" to radio. The single climbed the Christian Country Top 100 for 6 months before peaking at No. 6 in November 2011. "Thank God" was written by Nashville songwriter Andrew Scott Wills.

LWM Records released Johnny Jolin's "Thank God" follow-up single to iTunes and Country radio on November 11, 2011, titled "Tell That To God." The single peaked at No. 29 and was written by Nashville writers Chad Tyler and Andrew Scott Wills.

On Saturday, June 9, 2012, LWM Records announced Jolin would release a new single titled "Valley of the Shadow" deeming Tuesday June 12, 2012, the release date.

On Monday, August 20, 2012, Johnny Jolin announced on Facebook, Twitter and his official website that he was "retiring from playing music live as Johnny Jolin or in any other form" upon the grounds that God had convicted him of pride.

On August 30, 2019, Johnny Jolin released single "Hard To Be Good" to digital streaming platforms. The track was produced by touring guitarist Dave Smith.
