= The Front Porch Country Band =

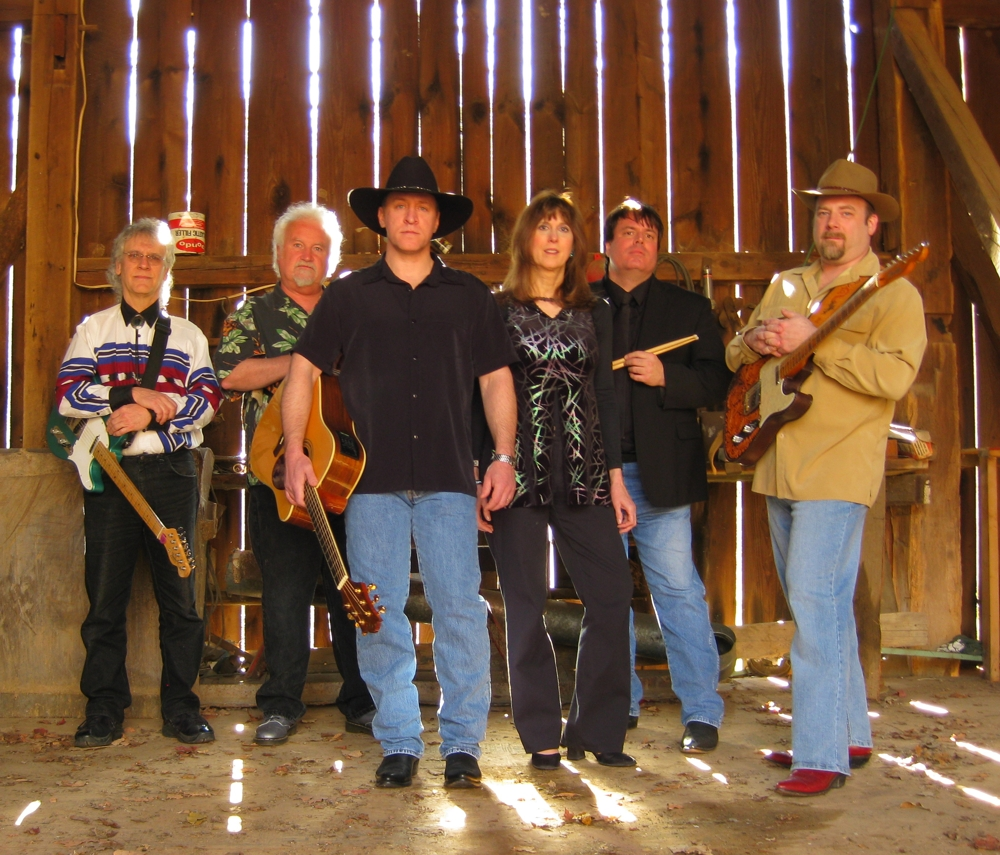
- The Front Porch Country Band in 2009

Background information
- Origin: Pennsylvania, U.S.
- Genres: Country
- Years active: 2001-present
- Label: USAgency Entertainment
- Members: Rick Buck; Joseph Paul Hauserman; Johnny Jolin; Kim Reichley; Alison Rupert; Richard Rupert
- Website: www.frontporchcountryband.com

The Front Porch Country Band is an American country music band formed in Pennsylvania in 2001. The six members came together from successful solo careers to record and perform as one group. The band includes country music star Johnny Jolin. Their music primarily falls within the country genre with subtle influences of rock and folk. The band’s distinct sound and stage performance is also influenced by the versatility of its performers, with each member playing a variety of instruments and sharing time on lead vocals.

The band first became widely known for garnering more than one million song plays over fifteen months on the internet music subscriber system, MP3.com. Following this exposure, the band toured mainland China at the exclusive invitation of the US-China Foundation.

The band opened for country superstar Randy Travis at The War Memorial in Trenton, New Jersey on May 10, 2009.

Their latest album, Here We Go Again, was released on September 21, 2009.

The Front Porch Country Band performed the world premiere of their multimedia Christmas production, "Christmas Once Upon A Time," on December 12, 2009 at the Community Arts Center in Williamsport, Pennsylvania. The show was later broadcast on PBS affiliate WVIA-TV on December 25, 2010.
