= Seaport Square =

Planned project in Boston

Coordinates: 42.35395°N 71.04444°W

Seaport Square is a master planned project in the Seaport District of Boston, Massachusetts. It spans 8.5 million square feet and 23 acres (9.3 ha) of land.

It is master developed by Boston Global Investors. Upon completion in 2020, Seaport Square is expected to develop into twenty blocks of retail, business, and residential space, knitting together the Financial District, Waterfront, Fort Point Channel and Fan Pier. The area is anticipated to include five new streets, over 20 buildings, and four prominent public gathering areas. It will offer approximately 2.6 million square feet of residences, 3,000 residential units, 1.3 million square feet of retail master developed by WS Development, 1.3 million square feet of offices, 2.2 million square feet of below ground parking spaces for 6,000 cars, 850,000 square feet (79,000 m^{2}) of hotel space, 1,000 hotel rooms, and 250,000 square feet (23,000 m^{2}) feet of cultural, civic and education space. Forty percent of Seaport Square's land is devoted to open space, including the one-acre, tree-lined Seaport Common with a Massachusetts Fallen Heroes Memorial, honoring Bay State servicemen and women who gave their lives to the War on Terror, and Sea Green, a multi-purpose green space that boasts a vibrant dog park, children's play area and half basketball court. The project qualifies for a Silver rating under the U.S. Green Building Council's LEED for neighborhood development rating system.

Seaport Square has direct access to downtown Boston as well as to the I-93 and I-90 interchange, is located in close proximity to Logan Airport and Amtrak’s South Station, and has access to public transit with the Courthouse Silver Line Station. Less than a quarter of a mile north of Seaport Square are The Rose F. Kennedy Greenway and Financial District, just steps south of Seaport Square is the Fan Pier, a 21-acre (8.5 ha) development.

One Seaport Square (One Seaport) is a marquee development located within the Seaport Square Master Plan. The $600 million mixed-use development spans 1.5 million square feet and is located on three-acres of land.[5] One Seaport is the largest mixed-use project in the City of Boston in thirty years. The project is led by three Boston-based companies Berkshire Group, WS Development, and Boston Global Investors. Its architecture is by Elkus Manfredi Architects. It will qualify for LEED Silver Certification.

Upon completion, expected in 2017, the development is planned to include two residential towers with 832 apartments in total and 250,000 square feet (23,000 m^{2}) of retail space across the towers’ first three floors.[6] Berkshire Group has partnered with Boston Global Investors to own and develop the residential component of One Seaport.[7] WS Development will develop, own and manage the retail component of One Seaport.

One Seaport’s residential towers are named The Benjamin and VIA; each will have a distinct style and provide a wide range of living options. Plans include a total of 832 units, with 354 distinctive apartment homes in The Benjamin, ranging from studios to three bedrooms, and 458 apartment homes in VIA, ranging from studios to innovation units to three bedrooms. One Seaport will include 96 units that meet the City Of Boston’s standards for affordable rent. VIA also includes 96 innovation units, which will be cost-effective studio and one-bedroom apartments with access to collaboration space. All apartments in The Benjamin and VIA are for lease only. Both The Benjamin and VIA are expected to feature several outdoor and indoor shared spaces. The Benjamin will include two courtyards. Both The Benjamin and VIA aim to be pet friendly buildings with a range of services residents have come to expect in high-end residential offerings. Private outdoor space was made a priority, with over one acre of outdoor terrace space designed for the residents.

With 250,000 square feet (23,000 m^{2}) of retail space, One Seaport represents the highest concentration of retail space in the Seaport District. WS Development, a locally based and privately led real estate firm, will develop, own, and manage all 250,000 square feet (23,000 m^{2}) of its retail space. One Seaport will offer shopping, dining, fitness and entertainment facilities on the first three floors of each tower. Tenants confirmed thus far are 75 On Seaport, Caffè Nero, La Colombe, lululemon athletica, Luke’s Lobster, sweet green, The Grand, Scorpion Bar, Tuscan Kitchen, Bonobos, Filson, L.L.Bean, Mr. Sid, Peter Millar, Warby Parker, Bank of America, Equinox, Seaport Barbers, Kings, and Showplace ICON Theatre.

One Seaport Square also has plans for Courthouse Square, a 17,000-square-foot (1,600 m^{2}), retail lined open space between the two towers that will serve as a pedestrian link between the buildings, the MBTA Courthouse Station and the Moakley Federal Courthouse.[8]

On the site of Seaport Square was the original Our Lady of Good Voyage shrine. A new church was constructed down the street and the old one was torn down.
