= CharlieCard =

Public transit card used in Massachusetts

- Location: Boston, Massachusetts, U.S.
- Launched: December 4, 2006; 19 years ago
- Technology: Contactless smart card; MIFARE
- Manager: Massachusetts Bay Transportation Authority
- Currency: USD
- Validity: Massachusetts Bay Transportation Authority; Berkshire Regional Transit Authority; Brockton Area Transit Authority; Cape Ann Transportation Authority; Cape Cod Regional Transit Authority; Lowell Regional Transit Authority; Merrimack Valley Regional Transit Authority; MetroWest Regional Transit Authority (until 2022); Montachusett Regional Transit Authority (until 2022); Southeastern Regional Transit Authority; Worcester Regional Transit Authority
- Variants: CharlieTicket; Bike CharlieCard
- Website: www.mbta.com/fares

The CharlieCard is a contactless smart card used for fare payment for transportation in the Boston area. It is the primary payment method for the Massachusetts Bay Transportation Authority (MBTA) and several regional public transport systems in the U.S. state of Massachusetts. It is used on the MBTA's subway and bus services, but is not currently accepted on the MBTA Commuter Rail and MBTA ferry systems.

The card was introduced on December 4, 2006, to enhance the technology of the transit system and eliminate the burden of carrying and collecting tokens. It replaced the metal token, which was phased out in 2006.

Work to convert to a second-generation electronic fare system (AFC 2.0) began in 2017. The first public phase of the conversion – contactless card and smartphone payments on the subway and bus systems – was launched on August 1, 2024. Second-generation CharlieCards, a new mobile app, and new fare machines were expected to be placed in service in 2025, with the system extended to commuter rail and ferry in 2026.

== Etymology ==
The CharlieCard is named after the lead character in the 1948 protest folk music song, "M.T.A.". The song was written to protest a fare increase in the form of an extra five cent exit fare for longer rides and was later made popular by The Kingston Trio in 1959. One of the rejected names for the farecard system was "The Fare Cod", a pun on both the way locals might pronounce "Card" and the fish that was once integral to the Massachusetts economy, and also a reference to other transit cards named for ocean animals, such as London's Oyster and Hong Kong's Octopus. Another rejected name was T Go card with the T being the symbol for the MBTA.

== History ==
=== Introduction ===
CharlieCards work on the MBTA's subway and bus services, most of which were converted in 2006. Token sales ended on December 6, 2006. The final fare-controlled station to be converted was Fields Corner station on December 22, 2006. They were originally expected to be usable on MBTA Commuter Rail and MBTA ferry services by December 2008, with testing on the Commuter Rail originally planned for summer 2008. By 2012, the MBTA had abandoned plans to accept CharlieCards on the commuter rail system. On June 22, 2020, a pilot program started accepting CharlieCards on the Fairmount Line, by validation at fare vending machines and obtaining proof of payment.

CharlieCards were gradually introduced to Massachusetts Regional Transit Authorities: MetroWest Regional Transit Authority (October 2010), Brockton Area Transit Authority (March 2011), Lowell Regional Transit Authority (November 2011), Merrimack Valley Regional Transit Authority (branded "Tap and Ride Card"; February 2012), Montachusett Regional Transit Authority (March 2012), Worcester Regional Transit Authority (April 2012), Cape Ann Transportation Authority, Cape Cod Regional Transit Authority (November 2012), Southeastern Regional Transit Authority (January 2013), and Berkshire Regional Transit Authority (January 2014). The MetroWest and Montaschusets Regional Transit Authorities no longer accept CharlieCards.

After a shift to CharlieCards, some employees working as token collectors were retrained as customer service agents. In March 2017, the MBTA announced they were planning on privatizing their customer service positions to increase efficiency. The MBTA hired a company called "Block By Block" and named "Transit Ambassadors". In August 2017, the new Transit Ambassador program was rolled out. As of December 2020, there were 200 Transit Ambassadors working in the MBTA system.

=== Automated Fare Collection 2.0 ===
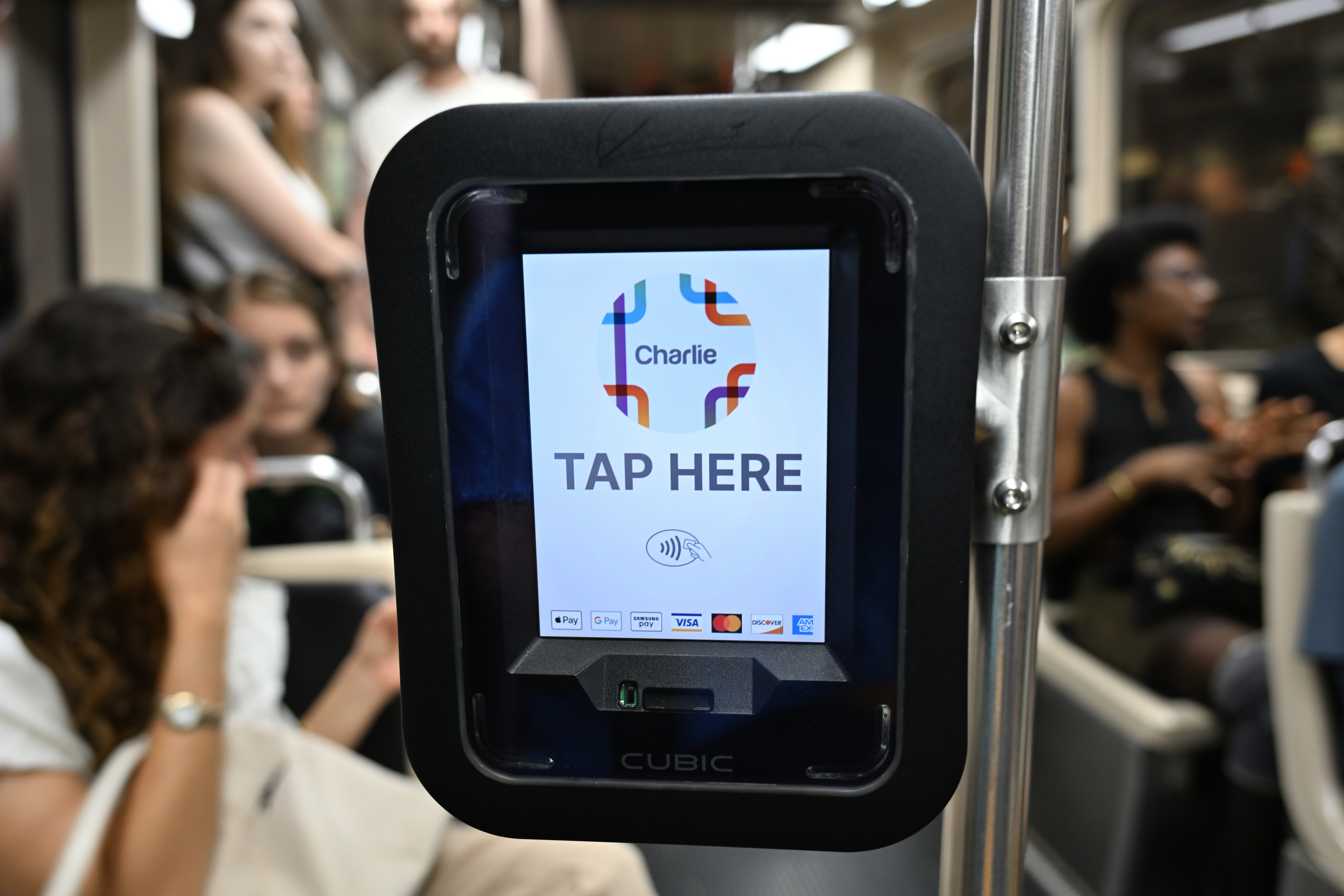
A contactless payment reader by the rear door of a Green Line train

In November 2017, the MBTA Fiscal and Management Control Board approved a $723 million contract with Cubic Corporation to replace the original CharlieCard and CharlieTicket with a new system ("AFC 2.0", for Automated Fare Collection) by 2021, that would allow fare gates to be compatible with contactless payment systems that have since been built into many credit cards and smartphones. To speed boarding, payment readers would be installed at all doors of Green Line trolleys and buses (to allow a proof-of-payment system) and cash-on-board payments would no longer be allowed, requiring customers to load cash onto cards at vending machines or retailers. It would also be extended to the Commuter Rail, where passengers would tap on and off. Public meetings on the new system were held in 2017 and 2018, but then stopped in 2019 until a revised plan was announced in December 2019. The new plan, costing over $900 million, was planned to roll out more gradually from 2020 to 2024.

In February 2023, the MBTA confirmed that the project might be delayed beyond the 2024 deadline. Contactless credit/debit card and smartphone mobile wallet payments was launched on August 1, 2024, on the bus and subway systems. As of May 2024, the second-generation Charlie Card system, including a mobile app and new fare vending machines, was planned to be introduced in 2025. The system is planned to be extended to commuter rail and ferry in 2026. The MBTA began the public test phase of the new Charlie Card in December 2025.

== Technology ==
The CharlieCard can store a cash balance and daily, weekly and monthly passes that allow unlimited rides during the set period of time. Passengers use the plastic CharlieCard by tapping it against a target on a gate or a vehicle farebox. When tapped, the gate or farebox either debits the cost of the passenger's ride, verifies that the card has a valid transfer or that the card has a pass that is valid for travel at the given time and location. Transit riders can add value or a monthly pass to their cards at machines located at MBTA stations and vehicles, MBTA ticket offices, and retail sales terminals at select outlets. Beginning in 2009, CharlieCards could be registered and have passes or money added to them online.

The original CharlieCards show no expiration date, but expired three to five years after they were first activated. CharlieCards distributed later had expiration dates printed on them and are valid for ten years, with the exception of Student CharlieCards which expire at the end of the school year they are issued.

Physical fare media are not used on The RIDE; passengers maintain an account by web site, phone, mail, or in-person visits.

Prior to 2021, if a user needed to replace an expired CharlieCard, they had to go to the Downtown Crossing pass sales office during business hours or mail the card to MBTA. Passes and stored value left on an expired card can be moved to the replacement card.

In 2021, MBTA announced plans to upgrade fare vending machines to be able to dispense CharlieCards. They also announced plans to have the new machines dispense “tappable” paper CharlieTickets, which can be scanned on future fare card readers that were under testing in 2021. Additionally, the new fare readers would allow riders to pay using a smartphone or contactless credit card.

== Card types ==
=== CharlieTicket ===
Automated fare collection equipment is also compatible with the MBTA's CharlieTicket, a paper card with a magnetic stripe that operates as a stored-value card or time-period (monthly, weekly, or daily) pass. The MBTA first implemented the stored-value CharlieTicket on the Silver Line in February 2005. Tickets are inserted into a slot in the gate or farebox, the fare is deducted, and the ticket is returned to the rider.

Upgraded fare gates and fare vending machined were deployed throughout the system starting in 2020 to allow the magstripe CharlieTickets to be discontinued on March 31, 2022. Part of the AFC 2.0 project, the new machines use a tappable version of the paper CharlieTicket.

=== Bike CharlieCard ===
On September 18, 2008, two 150-bike parking cages were made available at the Alewife station, next to the MBTA parking garage. Since then, a number of MBTA stations have been provided with secure, monitored bicycle parking cages. Previously, access to these cages required a free special Bike CharlieCard. However, as of the spring of 2013, any CharlieCard can be registered for bike cage access.

=== Free & Reduced Fare cards ===
Some riders also qualify for free or reduced fare.

Children under the age of 11, people who are Legally Blind, uniformed military personnel, uniformed police officers, uniformed firefighters and select government officials all ride free. Legally Blind people may request a Blind Access CharlieCard. All other non-fare-paying riders are let in by MBTA personnel - often upon presentation of ID.

People with certain disabilities, people on Medicare, people 65 and over, some middle and high school students in participating schools, and people 18–25 with low income are eligible for a reduced fare.

== Purchase options ==
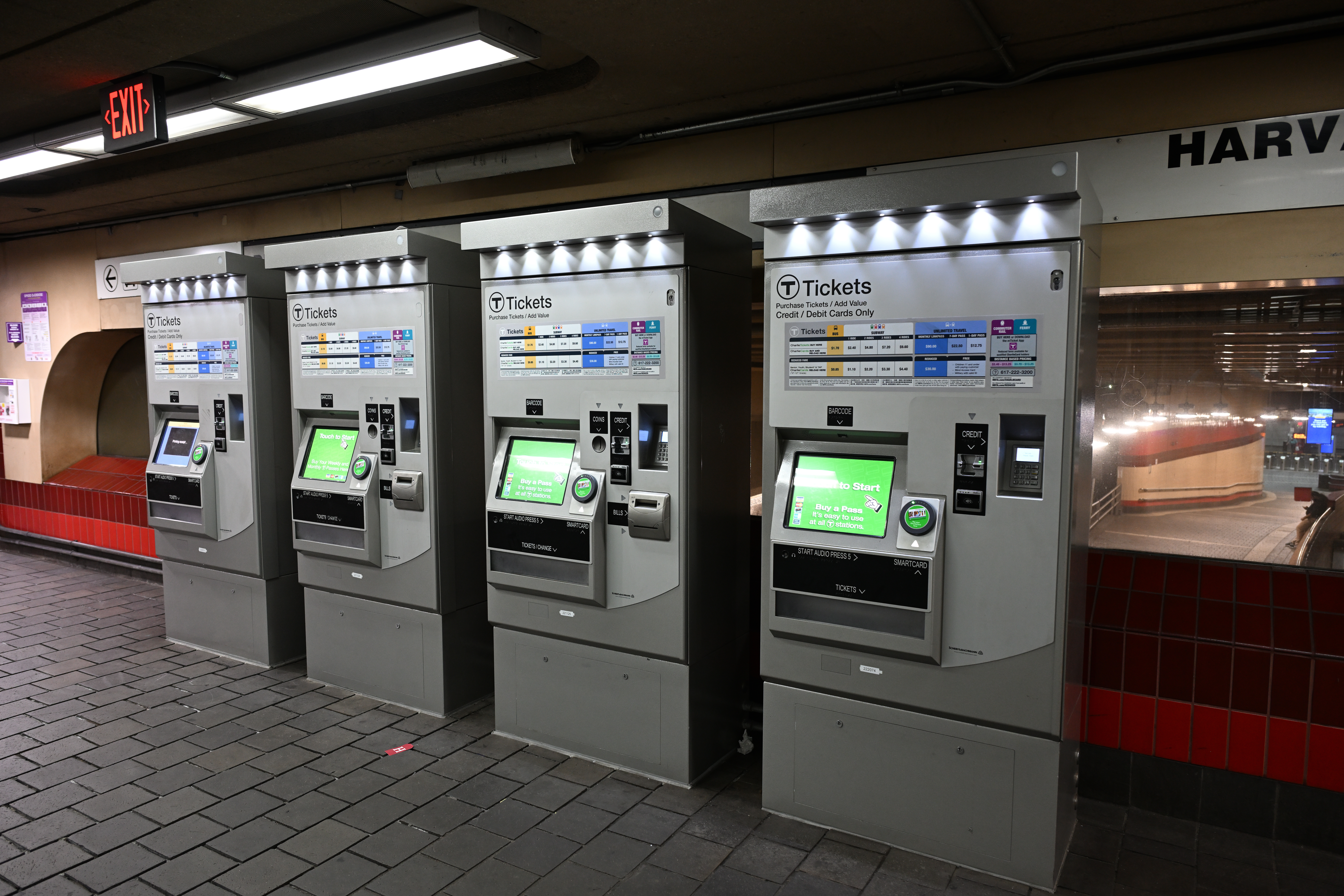
Fare vending machines at Harvard

When the MBTA transitioned to CharlieCards, they gave cards to riders for free. The cards gives a discount to CharlieCard users that began with the fare increase that took effect on January 1, 2007, and continued giving discounts with later fare increases. The MBTA continues providing the cards free of charge at pass offices, stations throughout the system and local retailers. Certain types of CharlieCards have reduced fares, including those for senior citizens, disabled citizens and students.

CharlieCards can be reloaded, and CharlieTickets can be purchased at Fare Vending Machines (FVMs) in transit stations, and elsewhere in the system, including buses. The fareboxes on buses and light rail trains accept CharlieCards, CharlieTickets and cash. In 2020, MBTA announced plans to phase out cash payments by 2025.

The bulk of the MBTA's vehicles and stations were transitioned to the CharlieCard-compatible system throughout 2006, with Fields Corner the last to be converted on December 22, 2006.

Fare Vending Machines are available at stations throughout the system, at Logan International Airport, and inside Fenway Park, and at stations on the Green Line D branch. Proof-of-Payment Validation machines are installed at select stops on the other Green Line branches.

== Criticism ==
=== Green Line inefficiency ===
The Green Line is heavily travelled. To manage the volume, in 2002, selected stops on the Green Line the MBTA implemented a pilot system known as Show-N-Go, which allowed riders to flash their monthly passes and enter through the rear doors of a train, reducing congestion at the front door. This system worked when monthly passes were on paper tickets, as each month's pass differed from the previous month, but became easier to evade when MBTA riders began storing monthly passes on CharlieCards, as passes held this way were harder to verify visually. The MBTA installed a proof-of-payment system at certain Green Line stations to reduce the rate of lost fares. Machines were installed that deducted the fare from riders' cards and gave them a receipt as proof of payment. Additionally, MBTA inspectors with handheld validators were stationed at the busiest stops to deduct money from and verify monthly passes on CharlieCards, also allowing riders to enter through any door. All passengers were required to go to the front of the train and make payment (or show their receipt) to trolley drivers.

In July 2012, the MBTA reverted to a "front door only" boarding policy on surface stations outside of peak hours to combat fare evasion. This policy also required passengers getting off the streetcar to walk all the way to the front of the car to exit. In 2016, the policy changed to an all-door boarding during busy hours and front-door-only boarding during off-peak hours.

The "Fare Transformation" project is currently in the process of converting all surface trolley and bus lines to all-door boarding using a proof of payment (POP) system. The first POP segment opened in March 2022, with the inauguration of service to Union Square station on the Green Line Extension.

=== Security concerns ===
Security flaws in the CharlieCard technology were studied and reported in a presentation by Henryk Plötz and Karsten Nohl at the Chaos Communication Congress in December 2007, which described a partial reverse-engineering of the algorithm used in the MIFARE Classic chip. The MIFARE Classic smartcard from NXP Semiconductors, owned by Philips, was reported as compromised in March 2008 by a group of researchers led by Karsten Nohl, a Ph.D. student in the Department of Computer Science, University of Virginia.

In addition, the security used on the mag-stripe CharlieTickets was broken by a team of MIT students. They were scheduled to give a talk about their findings at DEFCON 16 in August 2008, but were stopped after a federal lawsuit was filed against them by the MBTA, which resulted in a restraining order being issued. However, their presentation had already been published by DEFCON before the complaint was filed. On August 19, the court ruled the students could give their presentation.

In 2022, it was revealed that the NFC chip in some Android smartphones could interact with CharlieCards, including duplicating data from one card to a blank card. The MBTA indicated that its software systems detected a small number of such duplicated cards – about ten per month – which were then deactivated.

In 2023, four Medford Vocational Technical High School students found new vulnerabilities in MiFARE Classic that allowed them edit values on CharlieCards. This included adding anywhere between $0 and $327.67, as well as making employee cards. They presented their findings at DEF CON 31 with MBTA approval.

== See also ==
- List of public transport smart cards
- Gemalto
- Giesecke+Devrient
