= Jack Hynes (newscaster) =

American newscaster (1929–2018)

John B. "Jack" Hynes Jr. (April 15, 1929 – February 13, 2018) was a newscaster in Boston, Massachusetts. He was known as the "Dean of Boston TV News" and broadcast from 1957 to 2006. In 2008, Hynes was inducted into the Massachusetts Broadcasters Hall of Fame.

He was born in St. Brendan's Parish in Dorchester, Massachusetts, the son of Boston Mayor John B. Hynes. He was a graduate of Boston College High School in 1948 and then from the University of Notre Dame in 1952. He served in the US Marine Corps during the Korean War.

He began his career with WNDU in South Bend, Indiana before moving to WBZ in Boston. He then spent 26 years at WCVB and nearly 20 years at WLVI.

With his wife, Marie (née Kelly), he raised his four children, John B. Hynes III, Kelly Hynes McDermott, Barry T. Hynes, and Shauna Hynes-Baler in Chatham, Massachusetts. At the time of his death, he had 10 grandchildren and 4 great-grandchildren. He served on the Board of Governors of the Boston Athletic Association.
