= John Hynes (politician) =

Mayor of Boston

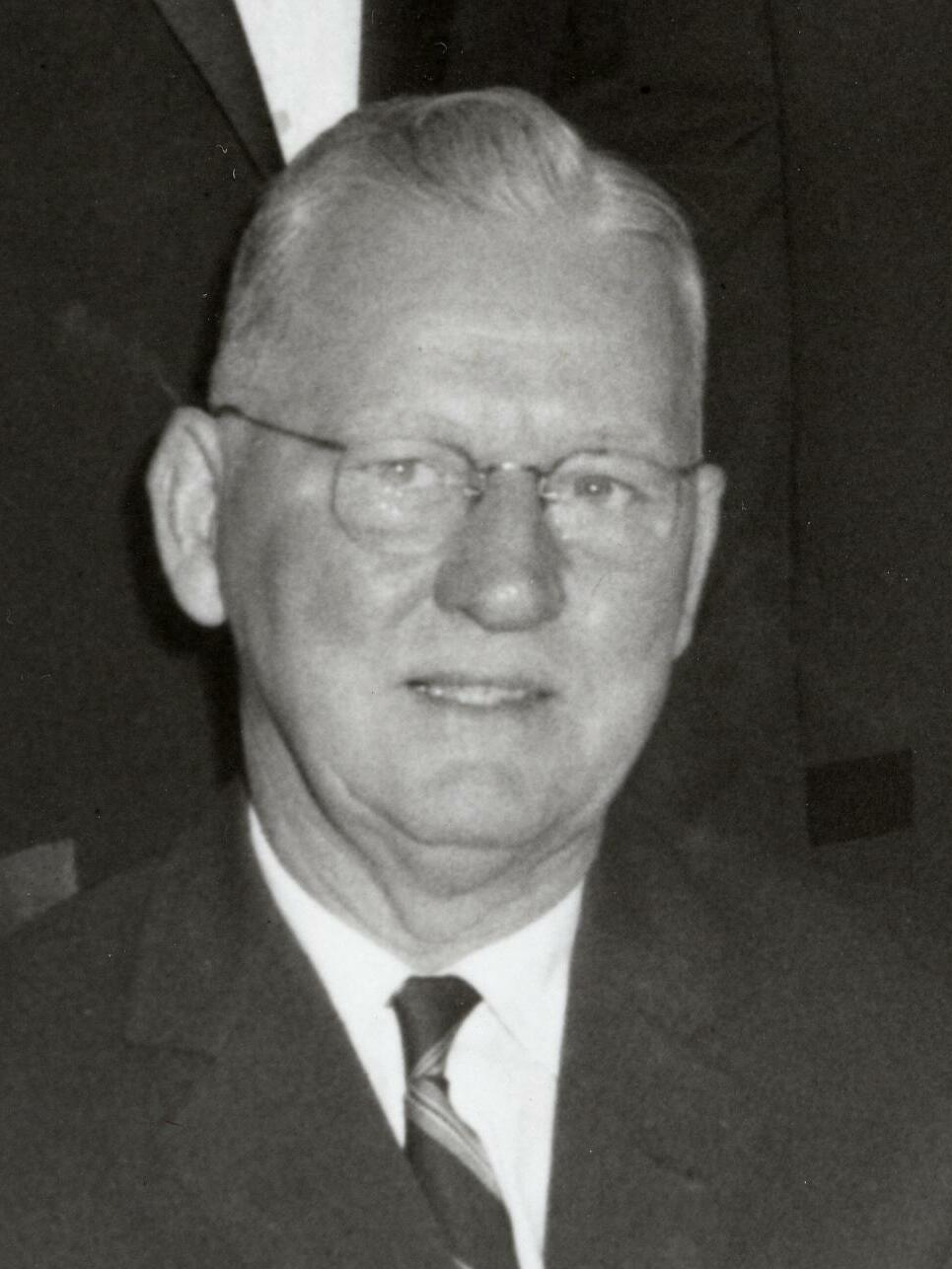
- Hynes circa 1965

Mayor of Boston
- In office January 2, 1950 – January 4, 1960
- Preceded by: James Michael Curley
- Succeeded by: John F. Collins
- Acting; June 26, 1947 – November 26, 1947
- Preceded by: James Michael Curley
- Succeeded by: James Michael Curley

13th President of the United States Conference of Mayors
- In office 1955–1957
- Preceded by: Elmer Robinson
- Succeeded by: Robert F. Wagner Jr.

Personal details
- Born: September 22, 1897 Boston, Massachusetts, U.S.
- Died: January 6, 1970 (aged 72) Carney Hospital; Boston, Massachusetts
- Party: Democratic
- Spouse: Marion B. Hynes
- Children: 5, including John Jr. and Barry
- Relatives: John B. Hynes III (grandson)
- Education: Suffolk University Law School

Military service
- Allegiance: United States
- Branch/service: United States Army; Signal Corps
- Years of service: 1917-1918; 1943
- Rank: Lieutenant Colonel
- Battles/wars: World War I; World War II

John Bernard Hynes (September 22, 1897 – January 6, 1970), was an American politician from Boston, Massachusetts who served three terms as the mayor of Boston from 1950 to 1960, after having served as acting mayor in 1947. As mayor, Hynes focused on shifting Boston away from the high tax and spending policies of his predecessor, James Michael Curley, and began Boston's urban renewal, eventually leading to the construction of buildings such as the Prudential Center and Boston City Hall. He also established the Freedom Trail.

Along with his successors John F. Collins and Kevin White, Hynes is considered responsible for the modernization of Boston.

== Early life ==
John Bernard Hynes was born in the South End neighborhood of Boston, Massachusetts, on September 22, 1897, the son of Bernard and Margaret Hynes (née Higgins). His parents had immigrated from Ireland.

Upon leaving grammar school, he worked for a telephone company. He served in the United States Signal Corps during World War I.

== Early political career ==
Hynes began his career at city hall in 1920 as a clerk in the health department. He later transferred to the auditing department and was chief clerk in the mayor's office during James Michael Curley's 1922 to 1926 term. On January 4, 1926, Hynes became the city's assistant budget commissioner. He earned his high school and college diplomas through evening classes, graduating from Suffolk University Law School in 1927. On June 18, 1929, he was appointed assistant city clerk. In August 1943, Hynes was commissioned a major in the United States Army, later being promoted to lieutenant colonel. He was discharged that December due to a reoccurrence of a chronic ear issue and returned to the city clerk's office. On September 1, 1945, he became Boston's city clerk.

=== Acting mayoralty ===
On June 26, 1947, Mayor James Michael Curley was sentenced to six to eighteen months in prison for mail fraud. The city charter allowed the president of the Boston City Council to serve as acting mayor in the mayor's absence, but his powers were limited unless the mayor was deceased. The Massachusetts General Court passed emergency legislation to bypass council president John B. Kelly, who had recently been acquitted on bribery charges and was in ill health, and to grant full mayoral powers to Hynes (who as city clerk was second in the line of succession) until Curley's release from prison.

Curley, upon his return from prison, commented to the press, "I have accomplished more in one day than has been done in the five months of my absence." Stung by this off-hand but disparaging comment about his performance as acting mayor, Hynes decided to challenge Curley in the November 1949 election and defeated him through tapping into widespread discontent with Curley's high tax policies and engagement with city bosses.

== Mayoralty ==
As mayor, Hynes primarily focused on lowering Boston's tax rate, which had been spiraling due to the policies of Mayor Curley, and bringing urban renewal to Boston.

Because of a change to the mayoral election system, the next election was held in November 1951, when Hynes again defeated Curley. Hynes faced Curley a third time in the 1955 mayoral race; Curley was eliminated in the preliminary election, and Hynes defeated State Senator John E. Powers in a bitter general election. Overall, Hynes served as mayor from January 2, 1950, until January 4, 1960, the longest continuous time in that office until he was later surpassed by Mayor Kevin White, and then later Thomas Menino.

During Hynes' tenure as mayor, he oversaw the opening of the Central Artery elevated highway through the city's waterfront district, as well as the opening of the Freedom Trail, which traces many of Boston's Revolutionary War era landmarks. He was responsible for founding the Boston Redevelopment Authority (BRA), which laid the foundation for developments in Boston in the 1950s and beyond including the redevelopment of the South End and controversial razing of the West End. Hynes was later lauded for starting the development of what would later be the Prudential Center, where the Hynes Convention Center is named for him. He also started the Boston Christmas festival and founded a complaints department, as well as the city's first incinerator.

After his reelection victory against Curley in 1951, a new "Plan A" system of governance went into effect in Boston, shifting the city to a strong mayor system. Hynes used these new powers to reduce the number of departments in the city from thirty-eight to twenty-six, and reorganized the Fire, Assessing, Library, Welfare, and Planning departments, and coordinated inspections among the Fire, Building, and Health departments. He established the Auditorium and Government Center Commissions to plan and erect a new city hall, eventually resulting in the construction of Boston's current city hall, and started a pilot redevelopment program in Dorchester. He personally struggled to phase out jobs held by family breadwinners.

Hynes served as president of the United States Conference of Mayors from 1955 through 1957. He was also named Democratic National Committeeman for Massachusetts.

== Post-mayoralty ==
After leaving office, Hynes set up a law office at 73 Tremont Street, a short distance away from the Old Boston City Hall, which had been in use during his mayoralty.

Hynes later served as Massachusetts' Commissioner of Banks from 1963 to 1967 and was elected a life trustee and treasurer of Suffolk University.

== Personal life and death ==
He lived in a modest house on Druid Street in Boston's Dorchester neighborhood with his wife, Marion, and their five children. Of them, John "Jack" Hynes Jr. later became a longtime Boston news anchor and the father of John Hynes III, Marie "Darby" Hynes Gallagher became a special education teacher in the Boston city school system, Richard Hynes taught at Boston University, and Barry T. Hynes served on the Boston City Council, later becoming its president, and was Boston's city clerk. His second daughter, Nancy died in her forties due to illness.

Hynes was known for his warm demeanor and love towards Boston's traditions, as well as for composing poetry.

Hynes died on January 6, 1970, aged 72, at Carney Hospital in Dorchester, Boston. He was buried in St. Joseph Cemetery in West Roxbury and was survived by his wife and children.

== Legacy ==
After his death, the John B. Hynes Memorial Auditorium, located in the Back Bay neighborhood of Boston, was named for him, as well as its replacement, the Hynes Convention Center.

Hynes, along with his successors, John Collins and Kevin White, are seen as most responsible for the modernization of the city of Boston.

== See also ==
- Timeline of Boston, 1950s

Political offices
Preceded by James Michael Curley	Mayor of Boston, Massachusetts; 1950–1960	Succeeded by John F. Collins
