= Deaths in August 2020 =

The following is a list of notable deaths in August 2020.

Entries for each day are listed alphabetically by surname. A typical entry lists information in the following sequence:

- Name, age, country of citizenship at birth, subsequent country of citizenship (if applicable), reason for notability, cause of death (if known), and reference.

== August 2020 ==
=== 1 ===
- José Vicente Anaya, 73, Mexican writer, poet and cultural journalist.
- Pablo Aranda, 52, Spanish writer, stomach cancer.
- Eduardo Arias, 64, Panamanian whistleblower, cancer.
- Frank Barnaby, 92, British nuclear physicist.
- Wendy Blunsden, 77, Australian cricketer (national team).
- Resurreccion Borra, 84, Filipino civil servant, Commissioner (2001–2008) and Chairman (2007–2008) of the Commission on Elections.
- Leonardo Bragaglia, 87, Italian theater actor, director and writer.
- Wilford Brimley, 85, American actor (The Natural, The Thing, Cocoon) and singer, kidney disease.
- Brenda Brown Canary, 74, American novelist.
- Emil Ciocoiu, 71, Romanian painter and photographer.
- David Darcy, 76, Australian football player (Western Bulldogs, South Adelaide) and coach.
- Julio Diamante, 89, Spanish film director (The Art of Living, Sex o no sex) and screenwriter.
- Rickey Dixon, 53, American football player (Cincinnati Bengals, Los Angeles Raiders, Oklahoma Sooners), Jim Thorpe Award winner (1987), amyotrophic lateral sclerosis.
- Alex Dupont, 66, French football player and manager (Dunkerque, Sedan, Ajaccio).
- Feri Horvat, 78, Slovenian politician, Speaker of the National Assembly (2004).
- Sally Jacobs, 87, British stage designer.
- Alexandre Keresztessy, 81, Hungarian-born Belgian TV producer (RTBF).
- Vitold Kreyer, 87, Russian triple jumper, Olympic bronze medallist (1956, 1960).
- Lawrence Laurent, 95, American television critic (The Washington Post).
- Kartika Liotard, 49, Dutch politician, MEP (2004–2014).
- Armand Mauss, 92, American sociologist.
- Geoffrey P. Megargee, 60, American historian.
- Stan Mellor, 83, British National Hunt jockey and horse trainer, Champion Jockey (1960–1962).
- Pydikondala Manikyala Rao, 58, Indian politician, Andhra Pradesh MLA (2014–2019), COVID-19.
- Tony Morris, 57, British newsreader (ITV Granada), kidney cancer.
- Abdul Hay Mosallam Zarara, 87, Palestinian artist.
- John Otto, 71, American politician, pancreatic cancer.
- Rodney H. Pardey, 75, American poker player, complications from a stroke.
- Tom Pollock, 77, American studio executive (Universal Pictures, The Montecito Picture Company) and film producer (Hitchcock), heart attack.
- Rosemary Radley-Smith, 81, British paediatric cardiologist, cancer.
- Harley Redin, 100, American basketball coach.
- Reni Santoni, 82, American actor (Dirty Harry, Enter Laughing, 28 Days).
- Harold Scheraga, 98, American biophysicist.
- M. S. Sellasamy, 93, Sri Lankan unionist and politician.
- Khosrow Sinai, 79, Iranian film director (In the Alleys of Love), COVID-19.
- Amar Singh, 64, Indian politician, MP (since 1996), kidney failure.
- Stan Statham, 81, American politician, member of the California State Assembly (1976–1994), heart attack.
- Ross Warner, 76, Australian rugby league player (North Sydney Bears, New South Wales).
- Douglas Wiseman, 90, Canadian politician, Ontario MPP (1971–1990).

=== 2 ===
- Saïd Amara, 87, Algerian football player (Béziers, Bordeaux, national team) and manager.
- Samia Amin, 75, Egyptian actress.
- Gregory Areshian, 71, Armenian archaeologist, COVID-19.
- Antony F. Campbell, 85, New Zealand-born Australian Old Testament scholar.
- Jerry Chipman, 79, American actor (21 Grams) and non-profit executive, spokesperson for St. Jude Children's Research Hospital, complications from heart surgery.
- Alan Cowley, 86, British-born American chemist.
- Umesh Dastane, 63, Indian cricketer (Railways).
- Marie-Hélène Descamps, 82, French politician, MEP (2002–2009).
- Bruno Dettori, 78, Italian politician, Senator (2001–2006).
- Leon Fleisher, 92, American pianist, cancer.
- Syed Iftikhar Ul Hassan, 78, Pakistani politician, MP (since 2013).
- V. Krishnasamy, 72, Malaysian footballer (Penang, Perak, national team).
- Douglas Latchford, 89, British art and antiques dealer.
- Jean-Louis Leonetti, 82, French football player (Marseille, Rouen, Angoulême) and manager.
- Adriana Naghei Ostrowska, 12, Swedish murder victim.
- Larry Novak, 87, American jazz pianist.
- Mark Ormrod, 62, English historian, bowel cancer.
- Suzanne Perlman, 97, Hungarian-Dutch painter.
- Keith Pontin, 64, Welsh footballer (Cardiff City, Barry Town, national team).
- Bobby Prescott, 89, Panamanian baseball player (Kansas City Athletics).
- Leslie Randall, 95, English actor (Billy Liar, Emmerdale, Goal!). (death announced on this date)
- Rip Van Winkle, 14, Irish racehorse and sire.
- Tootie Robbins, 62, American football player (Arizona Cardinals, Green Bay Packers), COVID-19.
- Yael Renan, 72–73, Israeli writer and translator.
- Bob Ryland, 100, American tennis player.
- Anant Shet, 59, Indian politician, Goa MLA (2007–2017).
- Satyanarayan Singh, 77, Indian politician, Bihar MLA (1990–2000), COVID-19.
- Albert Somit, 100, American political scientist.
- Ryōko Tateishi, 68, Japanese actress, lung cancer.
- John Tilbury, 89, British Olympic rower.
- Carol A. Timmons, 62, American military general, Adjutant General of the Delaware National Guard (2017–2019).
- Dick Trachok, 94, American college football coach and athletic director (Nevada Wolf Pack).
- Zhaksylyk Ushkempirov, 69, Kazakh wrestler, Olympic champion (1980).
- Kamal Rani Varun, 62, Indian politician, MP (1996–1999) and Uttar Pradesh MLA (since 2017), COVID-19.
- Wang Hai, 94, Chinese fighter pilot, Commander of the PLA Air Force (1985–1992).

=== 3 ===
- ATM Alamgir, 70, Bangladeshi politician, MP (1991–1996), COVID-19.
- Goldie Alexander, 83, Australian author.
- Dani Anwar, 52, Indonesian politician, Senator (2009–2014), COVID-19.
- Homayoun Reza Atardi, 50, Iranian musician, composer and producer, COVID-19.
- Ralph Barbieri, 74, American sports radio host (KNBR), Parkinson's disease.
- Mohammad Barkatullah, 76, Bangladeshi television personality, director and producer, COVID-19.
- Carmine Benincasa, 72, Italian art historian.
- M'hamed Benredouane, 69, Algerian politician.
- David Bishop, 91, American politician, member of the Minnesota House of Representatives (1983–2002).
- Ernesto Brambilla, 86, Italian Grand Prix motorcycle road racer and racing driver.
- Lorenzo Chiarinelli, 85, Italian Roman Catholic prelate, Bishop of Sora-Cassino-Aquino-Pontecorvo (1983–1993), Aversa (1993–1997) and Viterbo (1997–2010).
- Odile Croissant, 96, French biologist, physicist, specialist in electron microscopy.
- Roger De Pauw, 99, Belgian Olympic cyclist (1948).
- Philippe Frémeaux, 70, French journalist.
- Billy Goldenberg, 84, American composer (Kojak, Rhoda, Play It Again, Sam) and songwriter.
- Shirley Ann Grau, 91, American writer (The Keepers of the House), Pulitzer winner (1965), complications from a stroke.
- Pien-Chien Huang, 89, Chinese-American molecular biologist.
- John Hume, 83, Irish politician, MP (1983–2005), MEP (1979–2004) and Foyle MLA (1998–2000), Nobel laureate (1998).
- Ralph Klassen, 64, Canadian ice hockey player (St. Louis Blues), cancer.
- Celina Kofman, 95–96, Argentine political activist.
- Hana Krampolová, 59, Czech actress.
- Jürgen Kühl, 85, German Olympic sprinter (1956).
- Laverne Lewycky, 74, Canadian politician.
- Luo Pei-ying, 59, Taiwanese actress. (body discovered on this date)
- Pascal Martin, 67–68, French journalist.
- Sean Martin, 69, American-born Canadian cartoonist (Doc and Raider), pancreatic cancer.
- Ralf Metzenmacher, 56, German painter.
- Mohammad Reza Navaei, 71, Iranian Olympic wrestler (1976).
- Eduardo Márquez, 76, Peruvian footballer (FBC Melgar).
- John Okell, 86, British linguist.
- Ernie Phythian, 78, English footballer (Wrexham, Hartlepool United, Bolton Wanderers).
- William Rylaarsdam, 83, Dutch-born American judge.
- Ivan A. Schulman, 88–89, American literary critic.
- Michael Peter Smith, 78, American songwriter ("The Dutchman"), colon cancer.
- Adhe Tapontsang, 88, Tibetan dissident and political prisoner.
- Isabelle Weingarten, 70, French actress (Four Nights of a Dreamer, The State of Things, The Satin Slipper) and photographer.

=== 4 ===
- Ebrahim Alkazi, 94, Indian theatre director, heart attack.
- Frances Allen, 88, American computer scientist.
- Manabendra Bandyopadhyay, 82, Indian author and translator.
- Doris Buffett, 92, American philanthropist and writer.
- Brent Carver, 68, Canadian actor (Kiss of the Spider Woman, Parade, The Event), Tony winner (1993).
- Murray Cheater, 73, New Zealand Olympic hammer thrower (1976).
- Daisy Coleman, 23, American documentary subject (Audrie & Daisy) and sexual assault survivor, suicide.
- Tony Costanza, 52, American metal drummer (Machine Head, Crowbar).
- Joseph Thlama Dawha, 66, Nigerian chemical engineer, managing director of the Nigerian National Petroleum Corporation (2014–2015).
- Rajko Dujmić, 65, Croatian songwriter, composer and music producer (Novi fosili), traffic collision.
- FBG Duck, 26, American rapper, shot.
- Dick Goddard, 89, American meteorologist (WJW), writer and cartoonist.
- Jean-Paul Grangaud, 82, Algerian doctor and professor.
- Hu Ping, 90, Chinese politician, Minister of Commerce (1988–1993) and Governor of Fujian (1983–1987).
- Willie Hunter, 80, Scottish football player (Motherwell, national team) and manager (Queen of the South).
- Eddie Ilarde, 85, Filipino broadcaster (Student Canteen) and politician, member of the House of Representatives (1965–1969) and Senate (1972).
- Jerome Kohl, 73, American musicologist, heart attack.
- Kuo Mei-chiang, 66–67, Taiwanese pastor.
- Irene D. Long, 69, American physician.
- Abdul Mannan, 77–78, Bangladeshi politician, Minister of Civil Aviation and Tourism (1991–1996).
- Maurice Megennis, 90, English Olympic weightlifter (1952, 1956).
- Pat O'Day, 86, American broadcaster (KJR).
- Sunnam Rajaiah, 59, Indian politician, Andhra Pradesh MLA (1999–2009, since 2014), COVID-19.
- Vangapandu Prasada Rao, 77, Indian poet and lyricist.
- Irena Sedlecká, 91, Czech sculptor.
- Karam Ali Shah, 86, Pakistani politician, Governor of Gilgit-Baltistan (2011–2015).
- Moustapha Sourang, 71, Senegalese politician.
- Andre Spencer, 56, American basketball player (Atlanta Hawks, Golden State Warriors, Sacramento Kings).
- Jan Strelau, 89, Polish psychologist.
- Bob Sykes, 93, American football player (Washington Redskins).
- Ilse Uyttersprot, 53, Belgian politician, member of the Chamber of Representatives (2007–2010), mayor of Aalst (2007–2012), beaten.
- Sergio Zavoli, 96, Italian journalist and politician, President of RAI (1980–1986) and Senator (2001–2018).
- Alberto Zumarán, 79, Uruguayan politician, Senator (1984–1994).
- Notable people killed in the Beirut explosion:
  - Jean-Marc Bonfils, 57, French architect.
  - Nazar Najarian, 63, Lebanese politician, secretary-general of the Kataeb Party (since 2018).

=== 5 ===
- Hawa Abdi, 73, Somali human rights activist.
- Gésio Amadeu, 73, Brazilian actor (They Don't Wear Black Tie), COVID-19.
- Eric Bentley, 103, British-born American theatre critic (The New Republic) and playwright.
- Dóra S. Bjarnason, 73, Icelandic sociologist.
- Isidora Bjelica, 52, Serbian writer and playwright, cancer.
- Claudine Cassereau, 66, French model and pageant winner, Miss France (1972).
- John Chang Yik, 86, South Korean Roman Catholic prelate, Bishop of Chunchon (1994–2010).
- Mario Chianese, 91, Italian painter and carver.
- Horace Clarke, 81, American baseball player (New York Yankees, San Diego Padres).
- Sadia Dehlvi, 63, Indian writer and columnist, cancer.
- Michael Freilich, 66, American oceanographer, pancreatic cancer.
- Pete Hamill, 85, American journalist (New York Post, New York Daily News), Grammy Award winner (1976), complications from a broken hip.
- Agathonas Iakovidis, 65, Greek folk singer ("Alcohol Is Free"), heart attack.
- Sümer Koçak, 58, Turkish Olympic wrestler (1984, 1988).
- Lahai Gbabye Lansanah, 51, Liberian politician.
- Cecil Leonard, 74, American football player (New York Jets, Birmingham Americans) and coach (A. H. Parker High School).
- Stefan Majer, 90, Polish basketball player (Legia Warszawa) and trainer (national team).
- Joe Matesic, 90, American football player (Pittsburgh Steelers).
- Philippe Mongin, 70, French economist.
- E. T. Narayanan Mooss, 86, Indian Ayurvedic physician.
- María Victoria Morera, 64, Spanish diplomat, Ambassador to Belgium (2004–2007) and Germany (2017–2018), cancer.
- Don Mullins, 81, American football halfback.
- Shivajirao Patil Nilangekar, 89, Indian politician, Maharashtra Chief Minister (1985–1986) and MLA (1962–2014).
- Elmer Petersen, 91, American sculptor (World's Largest Buffalo).
- Anil Rathod, 70, Indian politician, Maharashtra MLA (1990–2014), cardiac arrest.
- Pierre Robin, 92, French aeroplane designer.
- James E. Powers, 89, American politician.
- Ken Robinson, 83, British Anglican priest.
- Blanca Rodríguez, 94, Venezuelan socialite, First Lady (1974–1979, 1989–1993), respiratory failure.
- Sameer Sharma, 44, Indian actor (Kahaani Ghar Ghar Kii, Yeh Rishtey Hain Pyaar Ke, Hasee Toh Phasee), suicide by hanging. (body discovered on this date)
- Frédéric Jacques Temple, 98, French poet and writer.
- Dick Tooth, 90, Australian rugby union player (Sydney University, national team) and orthopedic surgeon.
- Ivanka Vancheva, 66, Bulgarian Olympic javelin thrower (1980).
- H. D. L. Vervliet, 96, Belgian antiquarian.
- Vasily Vlasenko, 92, Soviet Olympic distance runner (1956).
- Chip White, 73, American jazz drummer.
- Aritana Yawalapiti, 70–71, Brazilian indigenous rights activist, cacique, and ecologist, COVID-19.

=== 6 ===
- Boris Bobrinskoy, 95, French Eastern Orthodox theologian.
- Lindsay Brown, 76, New Zealand accountant, chancellor of the University of Otago (2004–2008).
- Bob Calhoun, 83, American politician, member of the Virginia Senate (1988–1996), prostate cancer.
- Shyamal Chakraborty, 76, Indian politician, MP (2008–2014) and West Bengal MLA (1981–1996), COVID-19.
- Amaresh Datta, 101, Indian literary critic and poet.
- Louis Devoti, 93, French Olympic basketball player (1952).
- Werner Düggelin, 90, Swiss theatre director.
- Muslim Evloev, 25, Russian-born Kyrgyz wrestler, shot.
- Toos Faber-de Heer, 91, Dutch journalist.
- Wayne Fontana, 74, English singer ("The Game of Love"), cancer.
- Brian Green, 46, American game developer.
- Nikolai van der Heyde, 84, Dutch film director (To Grab the Ring, Love Comes Quietly, Help! The Doctor Is Drowning) and screenwriter.
- Brian Hogan, 91, Irish architect.
- Beverley Jackson, 91, American writer and journalist.
- Miriam Jiménez Román, 69, Puerto Rican academic, cancer.
- Joke Kersten, 76, Dutch politician, member of the House of Representatives (1990–1994).
- Mukund Lath, 82, Indian cultural historian.
- Wilbert McClure, 81, American boxer, Olympic champion (1960).
- Edward Wilson Merrill, 96, American biomaterials scientist.
- Louis Meznarie, 90, French automotive engineer.
- John Nkadimeng, 93, South African politician and diplomat.
- Solipeta Ramalinga Reddy, 57, Indian politician, Telangana MLA (since 2004), complications from circulatory surgery.
- Judit Reigl, 97, Hungarian painter.
- Lottie Louise Riekehof, 99, American ASL interpreter and author.
- Vern Rumsey, 47, American bassist (Unwound, Fitz of Depression, Household Gods) and recording engineer.
- Paul Schaffer, 95, Austrian-born French Holocaust survivor.
- Brent Scowcroft, 95, American air force officer, National Security Adviser (1975–1977, 1989–1993).
- Bernard Stiegler, 68, French philosopher (Technics and Time, 1).
- Apisai Tora, 86, Fijian military officer and politician, MP (1972–1977, 2001–2006).
- R. Venkataraman, 86, Indian cricketer (Madhya Pradesh, Vidarbha).
- Pierre Viot, 95, French executive.

=== 7 ===
- Abdullah Ahmed Abdullah, 57, Egyptian terrorist (Al-Qaeda), shot.
- Nando Angelini, 86, Italian actor (Il Sorpasso, Barabbas, Bloody Pit of Horror).
- Bernard Bailyn, 97, American historian, Pulitzer Prize winner (1968, 1987).
- Stan Bevans, 86, English footballer (Stoke City, Macclesfield Town).
- Edward Bruner, 95, American anthropologist.
- Tony Charmoli, 99, American dancer and choreographer.
- Deidre Davis Butler, 64, American disability rights advocate.
- Naima El Bezaz, 46, Moroccan-Dutch writer, suicide.
- Jean-Louis Ferrary, 72, French historian.
- Jean Gandois, 90, French industrial executive.
- Ronnie Goodman, 60, American cartoonist and street artist.
- Erich Gruenberg, 95, Austrian-born British violinist and teacher.
- Tomáš Grulich, 69, Czech politician, Senator (2006–2018).
- Charles K. Heiden, 95, American major general.
- Tim Irwin, 80, Canadian Olympic sailor (1968).
- Mahchehreh Khalili, 44, Iranian actress, pancreatic cancer.
- Ramadhan Seif Kajembe, 66, Kenyan politician, MP (2007–2013).
- Lungile Pepeta, 46, South African academic and paediatric cardiologist, executive dean of Nelson Mandela University, COVID-19.
- Lê Khả Phiêu, 88, Vietnamese politician, General Secretary of the Communist Party of Vietnam (1997–2001).
- Brian O'Brien, 86, Australian space scientist.
- Michael Ojo, 27, Nigerian-American basketball player (FMP, Crvena zvezda), heart attack.
- Nina Popova, 97, Russian-born American ballet dancer, COVID-19.
- Ian Reed, 93, Australian Olympic discus thrower.
- Peter Rees, 95, Welsh rugby union player.
- Carlo Rolandi, 94, Italian Olympic sailor (1960).
- Gary Schaff, 60, Canadian Paralympic athlete.
- Lorenzo Soria, 68, Argentine-born Italian studio executive, President of the Hollywood Foreign Press Association (since 2019), lung cancer.
- Adin Steinsaltz, 83, Israeli Chabad Chasidic rabbi, lung infection.
- Fred Stillkrauth, 81, German actor (Cross of Iron).
- John Stripp, 81, American politician.
- Gennadi Touretski, 71, Russian swimming coach.
- Constance Weldon, 88, American tuba player.
- Harvey D. Williams, 90, American army major general and activist, Deputy Inspector General of the U.S. Army (1980), complications from Parkinson's disease.
- Stephen F. Williams, 83, American jurist, Judge of the U.S. Court of Appeals for the District of Columbia Circuit (since 1986), complications from COVID-19.
- Mark Wirtz, 76, French musician and record producer (A Teenage Opera), Pick's disease.
- Mike Yaschuk, 97, Canadian ice hockey player (Saskatoon Quakers, Streatham Redhawks).
- Anthony Zahn, 45, American Paralympic cyclist, pancreatic cancer.

=== 8 ===
- Henri Amazouze, 83, French Olympic sprint canoer.
- V. Balakrishnan, 80, Indian politician, Tamil Nadu MLA (1980–1988), heart attack.
- Adrian Barber, 81, English musician and producer.
- Salome Bey, 86, American-born Canadian singer.
- Pedro Casaldáliga, 92, Spanish-Brazilian Roman Catholic prelate, missionary and human rights activist, Bishop of São Félix do Araguaia (1971–2005).
- Adam Comrie, 30, Canadian ice hockey player (Rochester Americans, Syracuse Crunch, EC KAC), traffic collision.
- Gordon DeGraffenreid, 77, American athletics coach.
- Bernard Fils-Aimé, 67, Haitian entrepreneur and activist, COVID-19.
- Stefan Getsov, 90, Bulgarian footballer (Slavia Sofia).
- Carolyn A. Guertin, 92, American colonel.
- Lane Ryo Hirabayashi, 67, American historian, cancer.
- Buruji Kashamu, 62, Nigerian politician, Senator (2015–2019), COVID-19.
- Bert Laeyendecker, 90, Dutch sociologist.
- Tekii Lazaro, 66, Cook Islands politician, MP (2011–2018).
- Anthony Lester, Baron Lester of Herne Hill, 84, British barrister, member of the House of Lords (1993–2018).
- Alfredo Lim, 90, Filipino politician, Senator (2004–2007) and Mayor of Manila (1992–1998, 2007–2013), COVID-19.
- Morris McInnes, 80, British-American academic, cancer.
- Gabriel Ochoa Uribe, 90, Colombian football player and manager (América, Millonarios, national team).
- Wayne Redmond, 74, American baseball player (Detroit Tigers).
- Konrad Steffen, 68, Swiss glaciologist, fall.
- Jean Stewart, 89, New Zealand swimmer, Olympic bronze medalist (1952).
- Robert J. Sunell, 91, American military officer.
- Ruby Takanishi, 74, American developmental psychologist.
- Jenny Tone-Pah-Hote, 40, American Kiowa academic, leukemia.
- Chica Xavier, 88, Brazilian actress (O Rei do Gado, Força de um Desejo, Um Só Coração), cancer.
- Nandi Yellaiah, 78, Indian politician, MP (2014–2019), COVID-19.

=== 9 ===
- Alauddin Ali, 67, Bangladeshi composer (Golapi Ekhon Traine, Sundori, Koshai), lung complications.
- Fips Asmussen, 82, German comedian, cancer.
- Rachid Belhout, 76, Algerian football player and manager (ES Sétif, ASO Chlef, CS Constantine), traffic collision.
- Kenneth Bernard, 90, American playwright, cardiovascular disease.
- Martin Birch, 71, British music producer and engineer (Deep Purple, Whitesnake, Iron Maiden).
- Anna Maria Bottini, 104, Italian actress (The Leopard, The Law, Angels of Darkness).
- Norman Carlson, 86, American correctional officer and businessman (GEO Group), Director of the FBP (1970–1987), lymphoma.
- Calaway H. Dodson, 91, American orchidologist.
- Murray Eden, 99, American physical chemist.
- Robert Fischer, 83, Canadian politician.
- Göran Forsmark, 65, Swedish actor (The Hunters).
- Fernando Garfella Palmer, 31, Spanish underwater documentary filmmaker and maritime activist, diving accident.
- Brendan Halligan, 84, Irish economist and politician, Senator (1973–1977) and MEP (1979–1984).
- Carroll Hardy, 87, American baseball player (Cleveland Indians, Boston Red Sox, Houston Astros), complications from dementia.
- Heta Hingston, 82, New Zealand judge.
- Cannon Hinnant, 5, American child, shot.
- Jeff Jacobson, 74, American photographer, cancer.
- Kamala, 70, American professional wrestler (WWF, CWA, WCCW), complications from COVID-19.
- Nouria Kazdarli, 99, Algerian actress.
- Joan R. Kemler, 94, American politician.
- Bhai Lal, 67, Indian politician, Uttar Pradesh MLA (1996–2002) and MP (2007–2009).
- Iain Laughland, 84, Scottish rugby union player and administrator.
- John C. Loehlin, 94, American behavior geneticist and computer scientist.
- Kurt Luedtke, 80, American screenwriter (Out of Africa, Absence of Malice) and newspaper editor (Detroit Free Press), Oscar winner (1986).
- Kemal Özçelik, 98, Turkish Olympic equestrian (1956).
- Thomas C. Richards, 90, American general.
- Mieko Takizawa, 81, Japanese novelist.
- Duane Tatro, 93, American composer (Dan August, The Manhunter, The Love Boat).
- Zaōnishiki Toshimasa, 67, Japanese sumo wrestler, multiple myeloma.
- Franca Valeri, 100, Italian actress (Il vedovo, The Shortest Day, Gli onorevoli).
- Laurent Vicomte, 64, French comic book writer.
- David Wilman, 85, British Olympic field hockey player.
- Frank Wright, 87, American painter, heart failure and pneumonia.

=== 10 ===
- Nadjmi Adhani, 50, Indonesian politician, mayor of Banjarbaru (since 2016), COVID-19.
- Raymond Allen, 91, American actor (Sanford and Son, Good Times, Starsky & Hutch), respiratory illness.
- Dariusz Baliszewski, 74, Polish historian, journalist and writer.
- Waldemar Bastos, 66, Angolan musician, cancer.
- Oscar Baylón Chacón, 91, Mexican politician and agronomist, Governor of Baja California (1989).
- Lorna Beal, 96, Australian cricketer (national team).
- Silvana Bosi, 86, Italian actress (The Talented Mr. Ripley, Mortacci, Bread and Tulips).
- Michael Chappell, 85, English military historian.
- Pierre Decazes, 88, French actor (The Shameless Old Lady, The Wing or the Thigh).
- Paddy Doyle, 79, Irish hurler (Tipperary).
- Imre Farkas, 85, Hungarian canoeist, Olympic bronze medalist (1956, 1960).
- Mike Finley, 70, American poet, complications from prostate cancer.
- Yisroel Moshe Friedman, 65, American-Israeli religious leader, Rebbe of Sadigura (since 2013), pancreatic cancer.
- Dieter Krause, 84, German sprint canoeist, Olympic champion (1960).
- Jacobo Langsner, 93, Romanian-born Uruguayan playwright.
- Barry B. Levine, 79, American sociologist.
- Vinka Lucas, 88, Croatian-born New Zealand fashion and bridal wear designer and retailer.
- Tripp Merritt, 52, American football coach.
- Maxie Minnaar, 47, Namibian politician.
- Neil Ocampo, 62, Filipino radio broadcaster (Todo Balita).
- Buck Olsen, 94, Canadian politician.
- Vladica Popović, 85, Serbian football player (Red Star Belgrade, Yugoslavia national team) and manager (Deportivo Cali).
- Alfred Püls, 86, Austrian Olympic ice hockey player (1956, 1964).
- Uri Ra'anan, 94, Austrian-born American political scientist.
- Luis Abilio Sebastiani Aguirre, 85, Peruvian Roman Catholic prelate, Archbishop of Ayacucho o Huamanga (2001–2011).
- P. J. Sheehan, 87, Irish politician, TD (1981–2002, 2007–2011).
- Alexander Taraikovsky, 34, Belarusian protester, shot.
- Mike Tindall, 79, English footballer (Aston Villa, Walsall, Tamworth), complications from dementia.
- Tetsuya Watari, 78, Japanese actor (Tokyo Drifter, Outlaw: Gangster VIP, Katsu Kaishū), pneumonia.

=== 11 ===
- Marcel Adams, 100, Canadian real estate investor.
- Gordon J. Brand, 65, English golfer.
- Floyd Breeland, 87, American politician, member of the South Carolina House of Representatives (1992–2008).
- Sixto Brillantes, 80, Filipino civil servant, Chairman of COMELEC (2011–2015), COVID-19.
- Walter C. Carrington, 90, American diplomat, ambassador to Senegal (1980–1981) and Nigeria (1993–1997).
- Salah Chaoua, 73, Tunisian footballer (Club Africain, Al-Madina SC, national team).
- Dinos Christianopoulos, 89, Greek poet, translator and publisher.
- George Christy, 93, American columnist (The Hollywood Reporter, The Beverly Hills Courier) and actor (Die Hard), heart failure.
- Édouard de Lépine, 88, Martinican historian and politician, Mayor of Le Robert (1989–1995).
- Dhammika Ganganath Dissanayake, 62, Sri Lankan diplomat, ambassador to Japan (since 2015).
- Belle du Berry, 54, French singer (Paris Combo), cancer.
- Don Edmunds, 89, American race car driver.
- Patrick Fairley, 77, Scottish musician (Marmalade), cancer.
- Oliviu Gherman, 90, Romanian politician and diplomat, Senator (1990–2001) and President of the Senate (1992–1996).
- Gaspard Hons, 82, Belgian poet.
- Mitch Hoopes, 67, American football player (Dallas Cowboys, San Diego Chargers, Philadelphia Eagles).
- Rahat Indori, 70, Indian lyricist (Khuddar, Mission Kashmir, Meenaxi: A Tale of Three Cities) and poet, COVID-19.
- Anneliese Kaplan, 87, German actress.
- Peter Kazembe, 65, Malawian pediatrician, cancer.
- Edmond Kiraz, 96, Egyptian-born French cartoonist and illustrator.
- Russell Kirsch, 91, American computer scientist, inventor of the pixel and developer of the image scanner, complications from Alzheimer's disease.
- Antônio Leite Andrade, 73, Brazilian doctor and politician, Senator (2005), cardiac problems.
- Trini Lopez, 83, American singer ("If I Had a Hammer", "Lemon Tree") and actor (The Dirty Dozen), complications from COVID-19.
- Paul Melba, 84, English comedian and impressionist.
- Geoffrey Nunberg, 75, American linguist, cancer.
- Juan Pastor Marco, 68, Spanish politician, Deputy (1977–1982).
- Sumner Redstone, 97, American media executive (CBS, Viacom, National Amusements).
- Alex Sandusky, 87, American football player (Baltimore Colts).
- Joseph Steighner, 69, American politician.
- Michel Van Aerde, 86, Belgian racing cyclist.
- Prince Waldemar of Schaumburg-Lippe, 79, German-born Danish royal.
- Helen Yate, 99, British Olympic swimmer (1948).

=== 12 ===
- William Arnett, 81, American art collector and writer.
- Lloyd W. Bailey, 92, American physician and faithless elector.
- Pavol Biroš, 67, Slovak footballer (Slavia Praha, Lokomotíva Košice, Czechoslovakia national team), heart disease.
- Sybil Brintrup, 66, Chilean conceptual artist.
- Josef Bulva, 77, Czech pianist.
- Carlos Burity, 67, Angolan musician.
- Dame Mary Drummond Corsar, 93, Scottish philanthropist.
- Francisco José Cox, 86, Chilean Roman Catholic laicized prelate, Archbishop of La Serena (1990–1997).
- Marvin Creamer, 104, American sailor.
- Ellis Faas, 58, Dutch make-up artist.
- François-Mathurin Gourvès, 91, French Roman Catholic prelate, Bishop of Vannes (1991–2005).
- Mary Hartline, 92, American model and actress.
- Lynn M. Hilton, 95, American politician and author.
- Mac Jack, 55, South African politician, Northern Cape MPL (since 2013), COVID-19.
- Gergely Kulcsár, 86, Hungarian javelin thrower, Olympic silver medallist (1964).
- Edmondo Lorenzini, 82, Italian footballer.
- Mónica Miguel, 84, Mexican actress (I Dream in Another Language, Más allá del puente, Under Fire).
- Gulsaira Momunova, 82, Kyrgyz journalist, translator and poet, kidney complications from COVID-19.
- Scott Alan Mori, 78, American botanist.
- Howard Mudd, 78, American football player (San Francisco 49ers, Chicago Bears) and coach (Indianapolis Colts), traffic collision.
- John Rolfe, 85, British actor (Cluff, Howards' Way, Doctor Who).
- Melvin F. Stute, 93, American racehorse trainer.
- Rajiv Tyagi, 52, Indian politician, cardiac arrest.
- Ivan Tymchenko, 81, Ukrainian jurist, chairman of the Constitutional Court (1996–1999).
- Gian Carlo Vacchelli, 38, Peruvian sports commentator and politician, Deputy (2011–2016), cardiac arrest.
- Robert Williams, 90, American psychologist.
- Gordon Yea, 95, Australian footballer.
- Igor Yefimov, 83, Russian-American philosopher, historian and writer.
- Bill Yeoman, 92, American Hall of Fame college football player (Texas A&M) and coach (Michigan State, Houston), pneumonia and kidney failure.
- Adrian Young, 77, Australian footballer (St Kilda).

=== 13 ===
- Shigeo Anzai, 81, Japanese photographer, heart failure.
- Frank Brew, 92, Australian football player (South Melbourne), COVID-19.
- Ash Christian, 35, American actor (The Magic of Belle Isle, Cleaners, The Good Wife), filmmaker and producer, heart attack.
- Ogden Compton, 88, American football player (Chicago Cardinals).
- Ali Dastmalchian, 65, Iranian academic.
- Michel Dumont, 79, Canadian actor (Chocolate Eclair, Without Her, Café de Flore).
- Chris Eccleshall, 72, English luthier.
- Essam el-Erian, 66, Egyptian politician, MP (2011–2013), heart attack.
- Peter Excell, 72, British engineer and scientist.
- Jacques Faivre, 87, French footballer (OGC Nice).
- Elizabeth Fell, 80, Australian activist and journalist.
- Giancarlo Ferrando, 80, Italian cinematographer (Torso, All the Colors of the Dark, The Violent Professionals).
- Bernd Fischer, 83, German mathematician.
- Nancy Gregory, 71, American choreographer and theatre director.
- Steve Grossman, 69, American jazz saxophonist.
- Daryl Gutterson, 67, Australian footballer (Carlton), cardiac arrest.
- Luchita Hurtado, 99, Venezuelan-born American painter.
- Gulnazar Keldi, 74, Tajik poet and lyricist, author of the "Surudi Milli" national anthem, COVID-19.
- Michael Lombard, 86, American actor (Filthy Rich, Crocodile Dundee, Pet Sematary).
- Nettie Mayersohn, 96, American politician, member of the New York State Assembly (1983–2011).
- Quentin McCord, 42, American football player (Kentucky Wildcats, Atlanta Falcons, Winnipeg Blue Bombers).
- Dave McCurry, 69, American football player (New England Patriots).
- Phil O'Brien, 89, Australian footballer (Hawthorn).
- Colin Parry, 79, English footballer (Stockport County, Rochdale).
- Irene Piotrowski, 79, Canadian Olympic runner (1964, 1968).
- Dimasangcay Pundato, 72, Filipino revolutionary leader and politician.
- Mark O. Robbins, 64, American physicist.
- Elaine Roulet, 89, American Roman Catholic nun and prison reform activist.
- Lorraine Thomson, 89, Canadian dancer and television host.
- Darío Vivas, 70, Venezuelan politician, head of government of the Capital District (since 2020), COVID-19.
- Richard M. Weiner, 90, Romanian-born German theoretical physicist.
- Jackie Wren, 84, Scottish footballer (Hibernian).

=== 14 ===
- Francesc Badia i Batalla, 97, Spanish-born Andorran civil servant and magistrate, Episcopal Veguer (1972–1993).
- Howell Binkley, 64, American lighting designer (Hamilton, Jersey Boys, In the Heights), Tony winner (2006, 2016), lung cancer.
- Donald Blackmer, 91, American political scientist.
- Julian Bream, 87, English classical guitarist and lutenist.
- Dan Budnik, 87, American photographer.
- Angela Buxton, 85, British tennis player, Wimbledon and French Open women's doubles champion (1956).
- William Davies, 89, Australian Olympic wrestler (1956).
- Ewa Demarczyk, 79, Polish singer and poet.
- Arthur Docters van Leeuwen, 75, Dutch civil servant, head of the General Intelligence and Security Service (1989–1995) and chair of the Authority for the Financial Markets (1999–2007).
- Tom Forsyth, 71, Scottish footballer (Motherwell, Rangers, national team).
- Sonny Fox, 73, American disc jockey (SiriusXM, WKIS, WJMK), liver failure.
- Surendra Prakash Goel, 74, Indian politician, MP (2004–2009), COVID-19.
- Ernst Jean-Joseph, 72, Haitian football player (Violette A.C., Chicago Sting, national team) and manager.
- Kenneth Kunen, 77, American mathematician.
- Valentina Legkostupova, 54, Russian pop singer, Merited Artist of the Russian Federation (2001).
- Moisés Mamani, 50, Peruvian politician, Deputy (2016–2019), COVID-19.
- Linda Manz, 58, American actress (Days of Heaven, Out of the Blue, Gummo), pneumonia and lung cancer.
- Joe Norton, 70, Canadian politician, Kahnawake grand chief (1980–2004, since 2015), fall.
- Kalevi Oikarainen, 84, Finnish cross-country skier, world champion (1970), Olympic bronze medalist (1968).
- Herb Orvis, 73, American Hall of Fame football player (Colorado Buffaloes, Detroit Lions, Baltimore Colts).
- Ferenc Petrovácz, 76, Hungarian Olympic sports shooter (1968).
- Purpleman, 58, Jamaican dancehall deejay.
- Robert R. Shahan, 80, American Anglican prelate, Bishop of Arizona (1992–2004).
- Shwikar, 81, Egyptian actress (Viva Zalata).
- Nesim Tahirović, 78, Bosnian painter.
- John Talbut, 79, English footballer (Burnley, West Bromwich Albion, K.V. Mechelen), complications from dementia.
- James R. Thompson, 84, American politician, Governor of Illinois (1977–1991) and Chair of the Intelligence Oversight Board (1990–1993).
- Pete Way, 69, English rock bass guitarist (UFO, Waysted, Fastway), injuries sustained in accident.

=== 15 ===
- Gaber Abouzeid, 66, Egyptian Olympic volleyball player.
- Mercedes Barcha, 87, Colombian muse, wife of Gabriel García Márquez.
- Murtaja Baseer, 87, Bangladeshi painter and artist, COVID-19.
- Bill Bowman, 74, American politician, member of the North Dakota Senate (1990–2018).
- Jimmy Cable, 62, English boxer.
- Arthur W. Chickering, 93, American educator.
- Stuart Christie, 74, Scottish anarchist and writer.
- Dick Coury, 90, American football coach (Philadelphia Eagles).
- Antonije Đurić, 91, Serbian journalist, author, historian and publicist.
- Ruth Gavison, 75, Israeli law professor, Israel Prize recipient (2011).
- Richard Gwyn, 86, Canadian author, journalist and historian.
- Elton Hobson, 95, Canadian football player (Winnipeg Blue Bombers).
- Marty Howe, 83, Canadian-born American ice hockey player.
- Abu Bakar Juah, 72, Malaysian actor, colon cancer.
- Vi June, 88, American politician.
- Wilberforce Juta, 76, Nigerian politician, Governor of Gongola State (1983).
- Grace Montañez Davis, 93, American politician, heart failure.
- Francis O'Brien, 92, Canadian politician.
- Svetozar Obradović, 69, Serbian comic book writer.
- Chilla Porter, 84, Australian high jumper, Olympic silver medalist (1956), cancer.
- Lefty Reid, 92, Canadian museum curator (Hockey Hall of Fame), cancer.
- Vimala Sharma, 93, Indian social worker and politician, First Lady (1992–1997), Minister of State of the Ministry of Consumer Affairs, Food and Public Distribution (1993–1996) and Second Lady (1987–1997).
- F. Neale Smith, 89, American rear admiral.
- Robert Trump, 71, American business executive (The Trump Organization).
- Henryk Wujec, 79, Polish politician, member of the Sejm (1989–2001).
- Henk Wullems, 84, Dutch football player (KFG) and manager (Go Ahead Eagles, Indonesia national team), complications from a stroke.

=== 16 ===
- Charles Allen, 80, British writer and historian.
- Hervé Blanc, 65, French actor (A Week's Vacation).
- Danny Campbell, 76, English footballer (West Bromwich Albion, Stockport County), pulmonary embolism.
- Tommy Carroll, 77, Irish footballer (national team, Shelbourne, Birmingham City).
- Chetan Chauhan, 73, Indian cricketer (Maharashtra, Delhi, national team), multiple organ failure caused by COVID-19.
- Nikolai Gubenko, 78, Russian actor, director, and screenwriter (A Soldier Came Back from the Front, Wounded Game, Life on Holidays), People's Artist of the RSFSR (1985).
- Aubrey Hill, 48, American college football player and coach (Florida Gators), cancer.
- Viorica Ionică, 65, Romanian Olympic handball player (1976).
- Ladislav Jirků, 74, Czech academic, rector of VŠPJ and politician, Deputy (2010–2013).
- Deirdre Le Faye, 86, English writer and biographer (Jane Austen).
- Nina McClelland, 90, American chemist.
- Martha Mednick, 91, American feminist psychologist.
- Bahman Mofid, 78, Iranian actor (Qeysar, Reza Motorcyclist, Wood Pigeon), lung cancer.
- B. Ahmed Hajee Mohiudeen, 87, Indian conglomerate executive and philanthropist.
- Esther Morales, 70, Bolivian small businesswoman and farmer, First Lady (2006–2019), COVID-19.
- Caio Narcio, 33, Brazilian politician, Deputy (2015–2019), meningoencephalitis complicated by COVID-19.
- Aisultan Nazarbayev, 29, Kazakh footballer and sporting executive.
- Emman Nimedez, 21, Filipino YouTuber, acute myeloid leukemia.
- Nancy Noel, 74, American artist.
- James Partridge, 67, British charity executive (Changing Faces).
- Ary de Sá, 92, Brazilian Olympic long jumper (1952, 1956).
- Jean-Michel Savéant, 86, French electrochemist.
- Gershon Shafat, 92, Austrian-born Israeli politician, member of the Knesset (1984–1992).
- Claire Shulman, 94, American politician, Queens borough president (1986–2002), cancer.
- Cathy Smith, 73, Canadian backup singer and convicted criminal.
- Pierre-Yves Trémois, 99, French visual artist and sculptor.
- Georg Volkert, 74, German footballer (1. FC Nürnberg, Hamburg, West Germany national team), complications from a heart attack.
- Ornella Volta, 93, Italian-born French musicologist and expert on Erik Satie.
- Xavier, 42, American professional wrestler (ROH).
- John K. Yambasu, 63, Sierra Leonean bishop of the United Methodist Church, traffic collision.
- Alexander Grey Zulu, 95, Zambian politician, Minister of Commerce and Industry (1964) and Defence (1970–1973).

=== 17 ===
- Folke Alnevik, 100, Swedish sprinter, Olympic bronze medallist (1948), complications from a bedsore.
- Zara Alvarez, 39, Filipino human rights activist, shot.
- Norberto Ángeles, 43, Mexican footballer, heart attack.
- Pavel Branko, 99, Italian-born Slovak film critic.
- Mário de Araújo Cabral, 86, Portuguese Formula One racing driver.
- Ali Chaouch, 72, Tunisian politician, Minister of the Interior (1997–1999).
- Fred Clarke, 87, Australian footballer (Richmond).
- Hugh Cochrane, 77, Scottish footballer (Dundee United, Barnsley, Margate).
- Elsimar M. Coutinho, 90, Brazilian gynecologist, complications from COVID-19.
- Barbara Doherty, 88, American Roman Catholic religious sister and educator, President of Saint Mary-of-the-Woods College (1984–1998).
- Bill Freund, 76, American-born South African historian.
- Boyd Grant, 87, American college basketball coach (Fresno State, Colorado State), complications from a stroke.
- Jasraj, 90, Indian classical vocalist, cardiac arrest.
- Nishikant Kamat, 50, Indian film director (Evano Oruvan, Mumbai Meri Jaan, Rocky Handsome), cirrhosis.
- Chaim Dov Keller, 90, American Haredi rabbi, COVID-19.
- Nina Kraft, 51, German triathlete.
- Claude Laverdure, 73, Belgian comic book author.
- Randall Rollins, 88, American pest control executive, Chairman of Rollins Inc. (since 1991).
- Stanisław Styrczula, 91, Polish Olympic biathlete.
- Savvas Theodoridis, 85, Greek footballer (Olympiacos, national team).
- Susan Walden, 63, American actress (Danger Bay).
- Richard M. White, 90, American electrical engineer, complications from a fall.
- Jorge Zalszupin, 98, Polish-born Brazilian architect and designer.

=== 18 ===
- Glenn Bassett, 93, American tennis player and coach.
- Richard Biefnot, 71, Belgian politician, member of the Parliament of Wallonia (1999–2004).
- Bob Bigelow, 66, American basketball player (Kansas City Kings, Boston Celtics, San Diego Clippers).
- Hans Cavalli-Björkman, 92, Swedish lawyer and football club chairman (Malmö FF), 1975–1998.
- Ben Cross, 72, English actor (Chariots of Fire, Star Trek, First Knight), cancer.
- Michael Diven, 50, American politician, member of the Pennsylvania House of Representatives (2001–2006), cancer.
- Mariolina De Fano, 79, Italian actress (Tutto l'amore che c'è, The Cézanne Affair, Make a Fake).
- Gheorghe Dogărescu, 60, Romanian handball player, Olympic bronze medallist (1984).
- Madhav Prasad Ghimire, 100, Nepalese poet (Gauri), respiratory failure.
- Ron Gorchov, 90, American artist.
- Joseph Gosnell, 84, Canadian Nisga'a indigenous leader (Nisga'a Final Agreement), cancer.
- Steve Gulley, 57, American bluegrass singer-songwriter, pancreatic cancer.
- Dale Hawerchuk, 57, Canadian Hall of Fame ice hockey player (Winnipeg Jets, Buffalo Sabres, Philadelphia Flyers) and coach, stomach cancer.
- Andrew Henderson, 98, Scottish cricketer (national team).
- Soeki Irodikromo, 75, Surinamese painter.
- M. A. Jabbar, 87, Bangladeshi politician and convicted war criminal, MP (1986–1990).
- Howie Judson, 95, American baseball player (Chicago White Sox, Cincinnati Redlegs).
- Wojciech Karpiński, 77, Polish writer and historian of ideas.
- Sayeeda Khanam, 82, Bangladeshi photographer, kidney disease.
- Eugene S. Mills, 95, American academic administrator, President of the University of New Hampshire (1974–1980).
- Amvrosius Parashkevov, 78, Bulgarian Orthodox prelate, Metropolitan Bishop of Dorostol (since 2010), complications from COVID-19.
- Ed J. Pinegar, 85, American author.
- Rick Pugliese, 67, Canadian Olympic water polo player (1972, 1976).
- Roger Quigley, 51, English singer and songwriter.
- Azizur Rahman, 76, Bangladeshi politician, MP (1986–1988, 1991–1996), COVID-19.
- Patsy Robertson, 86, Jamaican diplomat and journalist.
- Cesare Romiti, 97, Italian economist and automobile manufacturing executive, Chairman of Fiat (1996–1998).
- Jack Sherman, 64, American guitarist (Red Hot Chili Peppers), heart attack.
- Hal Singer, 100, American saxophonist.
- Mohammad-Ali Taskhiri, 75, Iranian Islamic cleric, member of the Assembly of Experts (1999–2007, since 2016), heart attack.
- Alan Trachtenberg, 88, American historian.
- Ivan Varlamov, 82, Russian football player (Spartak Moscow, USSR national team) and manager (Spartak Vladikavkaz).
- Han Woerdman, 77, Dutch physicist, Parkinson's disease.

=== 19 ===
- Fern Cunningham, 71, American sculptor (Harriet Tubman Memorial).
- Kosei Eguchi, 23, Japanese manga artist.
- Cora Etter, 95, Canadian politician.
- Durbin Feeling, 74, American Cherokee linguist.
- Randall Craig Fleischer, 61, American conductor (Anchorage Symphony Orchestra).
- Allan Fotheringham, 87, Canadian journalist (Maclean's, The Globe and Mail, Toronto Sun).
- Gerald Gaus, 67, American philosopher.
- Slade Gorton, 92, American politician, member of the U.S. Senate (1981–1987, 1989–2001) and Attorney General of Washington (1969–1981).
- Christopher Guy Harrison, 59, British furniture designer, lung cancer.
- Helmut Hubacher, 94, Swiss politician, member of the Swiss National Council (1963–1997).
- Gopalaswamy Kasturirangan, 89, Indian cricketer (Mysore, South Zone), heart attack.
- Justin Lall, 33, American bridge player, liver disease.
- Lyutviyan Mollova, 72, Bulgarian Olympic javelin thrower (1972).
- Gwen Moore, 79, American politician, member of the California State Assembly (1978–1994).
- Todd Nance, 57, American drummer (Widespread Panic).
- Atzo Nicolaï, 60, Dutch politician and board member, Minister for Civil Reform and Kingdom Relations (2006–2007), cancer
- Borys Paton, 101, Ukrainian scientist, Chairman of the National Academy of Sciences of Ukraine (since 1962).
- Nadir Salifov, 47, Georgian-Azerbaijani mobster, shot.
- Gennady Shutov, 44, Belarusian protester, shot.
- Agnes Simon, 85, Hungarian table tennis player, world champion (1957).
- Richard Taub, 83, American sociologist.
- Makoto Ueda, 89, Japanese-American poetry critic.
- François van Hoobrouck d'Aspre, 86, Belgian politician and baron.
- Reham Yacoub, 29, Iraqi civil rights activist and doctor, shot.
- Masakazu Yamazaki, 86, Japanese playwright and literary critic.
- Bernard Zimmern, 90, French refrigeration engineer.

=== 20 ===
- Frankie Banali, 68, American drummer (Quiet Riot, W.A.S.P.), pancreatic cancer.
- Ágnes Bánfai, 73, Hungarian Olympic gymnast (1968).
- Hasil Bizenjo, 62, Pakistani politician, Senator (since 2009) and Minister of Maritime Affairs (2016–2018), lung cancer.
- Frank Cullotta, 81, American mobster (Chicago Outfit), COVID-19.
- Chi Chi DeVayne, 34, American drag queen (RuPaul's Drag Race), pneumonia.
- Justin Townes Earle, 38, American singer-songwriter.
- Joe Englert, 59, American restaurateur, complications from surgery.
- Thomas Fararo, 87, American sociologist.
- Jack Gibbs, 92, American sociologist.
- Zalman Nechemia Goldberg, 89, Israeli rabbi.
- Desmond Guinness, 88, British-Irish author.
- Alan Harre, 80, American pastor and academic administrator.
- Tony Hart, 87, Jamaican businessman, philanthropist, and politician.
- Harold Janeway, 84, American politician, member of the New Hampshire Senate (2006–2010).
- A. Rahman Khan, 77, Indian politician, Tamil Nadu MLA (1977–1991, 1996–2001), heart attack.
- Branko Kostić, 80, Montenegrin politician, Acting President of the Presidency of Yugoslavia (1991–1992), complications from a stroke.
- Mary E. McAllister, 83, American politician, member of the North Carolina House of Representatives (1991–2009).
- Edgar Olson, 82, American politician, member of the Minnesota House of Representatives (1985–1998).
- György Rehus-Uzor, 74, Hungarian Olympic weightlifter (1976).
- Gary Reynolds, 53, American football coach (Green Bay Packers), cancer.
- Miron Sher, 68, Soviet-born American chess grandmaster.
- Dorothy Simpson, 87, British author.
- Janmejay Singh, 75, Indian politician, Uttar Pradesh MLA (since 2012), cardiac arrest.
- Piotr Szczepanik, 78, Polish singer and actor.
- Herbert Tabor, 101, American biochemist.
- Andrzej Walicki, 90, Polish historian and philosopher.
- Arnold Weber, 90, American academic administrator, President of Northwestern University (1984–1994), lung failure.

=== 21 ===
- Aldo Aureggi, 88, Italian fencer, Olympic silver medallist (1960).
- Antonio Bayter Abud, 86, Colombian Roman Catholic prelate, Vicar Apostolic of Inírida (1996–2013).
- Mohamed Ben Rehaiem, 69, Tunisian footballer (Sfaxien, Al-Nassr, national team).
- Jack Dryburgh, 81, Scottish Hall of Fame ice hockey player (Murrayfield Racers, Nottingham Panthers, Southampton Vikings) and coach.
- Sir Bob Elliott, 86, Australian-born New Zealand medical researcher.
- Mohamed Gueddiche, 78, Tunisian cardiologist, presidential doctor.
- Ulric Haynes, 89, American diplomat, COVID-19.
- Remy Hermoso, 72, Venezuelan baseball player (Montreal Expos, Cleveland Indians, Atlanta Braves).
- Marilyn Imrie, 72, Scottish theatre and radio director, motor neuron disease.
- Chris Kooy, 38, Canadian soccer player (Edmonton, Calgary Mustangs), cancer.
- Bryan Lee, 77, American blues musician.
- Thomas H. Olbricht, 90, American religious academic.
- Colin Porter, 89, British Olympic rower (1960).
- Sir Ken Robinson, 70, British educationalist and author, cancer.
- Tomasz Tomiak, 52, Polish rower, Olympic bronze medallist (1992), heart failure.
- Ron Tudor, 96, Australian music producer, label owner (Fable Records), and record industry executive.
- Jacques Visschers, 79, Dutch footballer (NAC Breda).
- Karen J. Warren, 72, American philosopher and ecofeminist, multiple system atrophy.

=== 22 ===
- Jan D. Achenbach, 85, Dutch-American acoustical engineer and academic.
- Edward Alexander, 83, American writer and academic, complications from surgery.
- Ahmed Badouj, 70, Moroccan actor, director and screenwriter, COVID-19.
- John Bangsund, 81, Australian science fiction fan, COVID-19.
- Jean-Marie Brochu, 93–94, Canadian Roman Catholic priest, founder of Le Noël du Bonheur.
- J. William Doswell, 93, American journalist and lobbyist.
- Thomas K. Gilhool, 81, American disability rights attorney, heart attack.
- Ted Grace, 89, Australian politician, member of the House of Representatives (1984–1998).
- John Green, 74, Australian politician, member of the Tasmanian House of Assembly (1974–1980).
- Mrinal Haque, 61, Bangladeshi sculptor, complications from diabetes.
- Józefa Hennelowa, 95, Polish publicist and journalist (Tygodnik Powszechny), member of the Sejm (1989–1993).
- Emil Jula, 40, Romanian footballer (Universitatea Cluj, Oțelul Galați, Energie Cottbus), heart failure.
- Karim Kamalov, 66, Uzbek politician, Mayor of Bukhara (1997–2011, 2017–2020), Governor of Bukhara Region (since 2020), COVID-19.
- Cleve Loney, 69, American politician, member of the Montana House of Representatives (2011–2013), drowned.
- Walter Lure, 71, American guitarist (The Heartbreakers), lung and liver cancer.
- Pierre Maresca, 79, French New Caledonian politician.
- Alessandro Mazzinghi, 81, Italian boxer, WBA and WBC world light-middleweight champion (1963–1965, 1968), stroke.
- Pedro Nájera, 91, Mexican footballer (Club América, national team).
- John Ohala, 79, American linguist.
- Ulla Pia, 75, Danish singer ("Stop – mens legen er go'"), cancer.
- Magdalen Redman, 90, American baseball player (Kenosha Comets, Grand Rapids Chicks).
- Allan Rich, 94, American actor (Serpico, Quiz Show, Amistad), dementia.
- D. J. Rogers, 72, American soul singer and producer.
- Steve Sample Sr., 90, American bandleader and arranger.
- Julie Schmit-Albin, 63, American anti-abortion activist, cancer.
- Roger Unger, 96, American endocrinologist.

=== 23 ===
- Peter Borwein, 67, Scottish-born Canadian mathematician, pneumonia.
- Bill Burega, 88, Canadian ice hockey player (Toronto Maple Leafs).
- Augusto Caminito, 81, Italian film director, producer, and screenwriter (Vampire in Venice, Hallelujah for Django).
- Benny Chan, 58, Hong Kong film director (What a Hero!, Gen-X Cops, New Police Story), nasopharyngeal carcinoma.
- Eugene A. Cook, 82, American lawyer and jurist, Justice of the Supreme Court of Texas (1988–1992).
- Sir Neil Douglas, 71, Scottish physician, President of the Royal College of Physicians of Edinburgh (2004–2010).
- Frank Dunphy, 82, Irish business manager and accountant (Damien Hirst).
- Adhemar Grijó Filho, 88, Brazilian Olympic swimmer and water polo player.
- Rolf Gohs, 86, Swedish comic creator and cover artist (Fantomen).
- John H. Hager, 83, American politician, Lieutenant Governor of Virginia (1998–2002).
- Gerald D. Hines, 95, American real estate developer, founder of Hines Interests Limited Partnership.
- Maria Janion, 93, Polish scholar and critic.
- Peter King, 80, English jazz saxophonist.
- Bernard Lieder, 97, American politician, member of the Minnesota House of Representatives (1985–2011).
- Edith Raymond Locke, 99, Austrian-American magazine editor (Mademoiselle).
- Zuray Marcano, 66, Venezuelan Paralympic powerlifter (2016).
- Revil Mason, 91, South African archaeologist.
- Fujio Matsuda, 95, American engineer and academic administrator, President of the University of Hawaii (1974–1984).
- Greg Montgomery, 55, American football player (Houston Oilers, Detroit Lions, Baltimore Ravens).
- Lori Nelson, 87, American actress (Revenge of the Creature, How to Marry a Millionaire, I Died a Thousand Times).
- Nursholeh, 63, Indonesian politician, Mayor of Tegal (2017–2019).
- Charlie Persip, 91, American jazz drummer.
- Giannis Poulopoulos, 79, Greek singer-songwriter, cardiac arrest.
- Preston Powell, 83, American football player (Cleveland Browns).
- Valentina Prudskova, 81, Russian fencer, Olympic champion (1960) and silver medallist (1964).
- A. B. Raj, 95, Indian film director (Ormikkaan Omanikkaan, Manasse Ninakku Mangalam, Aval Oru Devaalayam), heart attack.
- Luigi Serafini, 69, Italian Olympic basketball player (1972, 1976).
- Bill Stephen, 92, Australian football player (Fitzroy) and coach (Essendon).
- Olayinka Sule, 72, Nigerian military officer, Administrator of Jigawa State (1991–1992).
- John Tarrant, 68, American bishop, heart attack.
- Jack Tynan, 94, New Zealand Olympic field hockey player (1956), and cricketer (Wellington).
- Kōzō Watanabe, 88, Japanese politician, member of the House of Representatives (1969–2012).

=== 24 ===
- Stoyan Alexandrov, 71, Bulgarian economist, Minister of Finance (1992–1994).
- Frederick Baker, 55, Austrian-British filmmaker and archaeologist.
- Harold Best, 82, British politician, MP (1997–2005).
- Pat Brady, 84, Irish footballer (Millwall).
- László Cseh Sr., 68, Hungarian Olympic swimmer (1968, 1972).
- Robbe De Hert, 77, English-born Belgian film director (De Witte van Sichem, Brylcream Boulevard, Lijmen/Het Been), complications from diabetes.
- Sálvio Dino, 88, Brazilian writer and politician, Deputy (1963–1964, 1974–1979) and mayor of João Lisboa (1989–1993, 1997–2001), complications from COVID-19.
- Chitta Ranjan Dutta, 93, Bangladeshi military officer, Director General of the Bangladesh Rifles (1971–1974).
- Carl Garrett, 72, American football player (Chicago Bears, New York Jets, Oakland Raiders).
- Avner Golasa, 63, Israeli footballer (Hapoel Kfar Saba).
- Nancy Guptill, 79, Canadian politician, Prince Edward Island MLA (1987–2000).
- Thomas Imrie, 83, British Hall of Fame ice hockey player (Paisley Pirates, Brighton Tigers, national team).
- Touriya Jabrane, 67, Moroccan theatre director and politician, minister of culture (2007–2009), complications from COVID-19.
- Arrigo Levi, 94, Italian journalist, managing director of La Stampa (1973–1978).
- Kriemhild Limberg, 85, German Olympic discus thrower (1960, 1964).
- Pascal Lissouba, 88, Congolese politician, President (1992–1997) and Prime Minister (1963–1966), complications from Alzheimer's disease.
- Jean Mauriac, 96, French writer and journalist.
- Pat McCluskey, 68, Scottish footballer (Celtic, Dumbarton).
- Hisamodien Mohamed, 55, South African politician and advocate, Member of the National Assembly of South Africa (2019–2020) and Western Cape head of the Department of Justice and Constitutional Development (1997–2019).
- Mal Pascoe, 87, Australian football player (Essendon, Hobart) and coach.
- Margot Prior, 82, Australian judge, COVID-19.
- Jorge Sanjinez Lenz, 103, Peruvian military volunteer and World War II veteran (Independent Belgian Brigade).
- Gail Sheehy, 83, American author (Hillary's Choice), complications from pneumonia.
- Raymond S. Troubh, 94, American financial consultant.
- Wolfgang Uhlmann, 85, German chess grandmaster, fall.
- P. B. Waite, 98, Canadian historian.
- Hartmut Wenzel, 73, German Olympic rower.
- Paul Wolfisberg, 87, Swiss football player (Biel-Bienne) and manager (FC Luzern, national team).

=== 25 ===
- Erik Allardt, 95, Finnish sociologist, Chancellor of Åbo Akademi University (1992–1994).
- Francisco Belaúnde, 96, Peruvian politician, President of the Congress (1980–1981) and congressman (1980–1990).
- Georges Bœuf, 82, French composer and musician.
- Cora Canne Meijer, 91, Dutch mezzo-soprano and voice teacher.
- Roine Carlsson, 82, Swedish politician, Minister of Defence 1985–1991.
- Tommy Joe Coffey, 83, American-born Canadian football player (Edmonton Eskimos, Hamilton Tiger-Cats, Toronto Argonauts).
- Pedro de Oraá, 88, Cuban painter.
- Victor Ferkiss, 95, American historian.
- Riley Gale, 34, American singer (Power Trip), pulmonary edema resulting from a fentanyl overdose.
- Rebeca Guber, 94, Argentine mathematician and computer scientist.
- Eric M. Hammel, 74, American military historian and novelist, Parkinson's disease.
- Mick Hart, 50, Australian folk musician.
- Ruhollah Hosseinian, 64, Iranian politician, member of the Council for Spreading Mahmoud Ahmadinejad's Thoughts (since 2007).
- Lillette Jenkins-Wisner, 96, American singer and pianist.
- Mónica Jiménez, 79, Chilean politician, Minister of Education (2008–2010) and Ambassador to Israel (since 2016), cancer.
- Bill N. Lacy, 87, American architect.
- Yvon Le Corre, 80, French painter and navigator.
- Laurent Akran Mandjo, 79, Ivorian Roman Catholic prelate, Bishop of Yopougon (1982–2015).
- Gerry McGhee, 58, Scottish singer (Brighton Rock), cancer.
- Sase Narain, 95, Guyanese politician, Speaker of the National Assembly (1971–1992).
- Graham Newdick, 71, New Zealand cricketer (Wellington).
- Itaru Oki, 79, Japanese jazz trumpeter and flugelhornist.
- Sir David Parry-Evans, 85, British air chief marshal.
- Tim Renton, Baron Renton of Mount Harry, 88, British politician, MP (1974–1997), Member of the House of Lords (1997–2016).
- Neil Sachse, 69, Australian footballer and disability advocate.
- Hippolyte Simon, 76, French Roman Catholic prelate, Archbishop of Clermont (2002–2016).
- Nik Spatari, 91, Italian painter and sculptor.
- Arnold Spielberg, 103, American electrical engineer (GE-200 series).
- Alma G. Stallworth, 87, American politician, member of the Michigan House of Representatives (1971–1974, 1983–1996, 2003–2004).

=== 26 ===
- Gerald Carr, 88, American astronaut (Skylab 4) and aeronautical engineer.
- Oscar Cruz, 85, Filipino Roman Catholic prelate, Archbishop of Lingayen–Dagupan (1991–2009), president of the CBCP (1995–1999), complications from COVID-19.
- Geraldine Dillon, 84, Australian television chef, Hodgkin lymphoma.
- André-Paul Duchâteau, 95, Belgian novelist, scriptwriter and comics writer (Chick Bill, Ric Hochet).
- Harry Elias, 83, Singaporean lawyer.
- Max Evans, 95, American writer.
- Adrien Gouteyron, 87, French politician.
- Wilf Greaves, 84, Canadian boxer.
- Stuart Hailstone, 58, South African squash player, stroke.
- Harry Hooper, 87, English footballer (West Ham United, Birmingham City, Sunderland), Alzheimer's disease.
- Chizu Iiyama, 98, American civil rights activist and social worker.
- Keri Kaa, 78, New Zealand educator and writer.
- Mauricio Kattan, 77, Bolivian Olympic sport shooter.
- Masahiro Koishikawa, 68, Japanese astronomer, lung cancer.
- José Lamiel, 96, Spanish painter and sculptor.
- Douglas MacDiarmid, 97, New Zealand painter.
- Masaru Maeta, 38, Japanese sumo wrestler, heart attack.
- Victor Hugo Martínez Contreras, 90, Guatemalan Roman Catholic prelate, Archbishop of Los Altos Quetzaltenango-Totonicapán (1987–2007).
- Lezmond Mitchell, 38, American convicted murderer, execution by lethal injection.
- Dirk Mudge, 92, Namibian politician, COVID-19.
- Martin O'Neill, Baron O'Neill of Clackmannan, 75, Scottish politician, MP (1979–2005) and member of the House of Lords (since 2005).
- Gaston Roberge, 85, French-Canadian priest and film historian, cardiac arrest.
- Jean Rosenthal, 97, French translator.
- Ronald E. Rosser, 90, American soldier, Medal of Honor recipient.
- Joe Ruby, 87, American animator and television producer (Scooby-Doo, Dynomutt, Dog Wonder, Alvin and the Chipmunks), co-founder of Ruby-Spears.
- Stanford G. Ross, 88, American attorney, Commissioner of the Social Security Administration (1978–1979).
- Bernard Sapoval, 82, French physicist.
- Aurel Simion, 74, Romanian Olympic boxer.
- Ørnulf Tofte, 98, Norwegian police officer (Police Surveillance Agency).
- Trương Kim Hùng, 68, Vietnamese Olympic cyclist.
- Els Veder-Smit, 98, Dutch politician, State Secretary for Health and Environment (1977–1981).
- Jim Wood, 67, British Olympic biathlete.
- Joyce Wright, 98, British singer and actress.
- Dan Yochum, 70, American Hall of Fame football player (Montreal Alouettes, Edmonton Eskimos).

=== 27 ===
- Siah Armajani, 81, Iranian-American sculptor and architect.
- Bob Armstrong, 80, American Hall of Fame professional wrestler (GCW, SECW, SMW), bone cancer.
- Valerie Askew, 81, British modelling agent, heart failure.
- Althea Braithwaite, 80, English author and illustrator.
- David Bryant, 88, British lawn bowler, world champion (1966, 1980, 1988).
- Pierluigi Camiscioni, 67, Italian rugby player and stuntman.
- Lance Castles, 83, Australian scholar.
- Cao Chunan, 90, Chinese electrochemist, member of the Chinese Academy of Sciences.
- Gilda Cordero-Fernando, 90, Filipino writer and visual artist.
- Claude De Bruyn, 76, Belgian serviceman and television presenter.
- Sunil Dhar, 87, Bangladeshi classical musician, heart failure.
- Robert Finkelstein, 104, American theoretical physicist.
- Tony Fletcher, 85, Australian politician, Tasmanian MLC (1981–2005).
- Jean-Michel Goutier, 85, French poet.
- Margrét Þóra Hallgrímsson, 90, Icelandic businesswoman and socialite.
- Noriyuki Haraguchi, 74, Japanese artist, stomach cancer.
- William E. Harbour, 78, American civil rights activist (Freedom Riders).
- Yves Hervochon, 85, French painter.
- James E. Humphreys, 80, American mathematician, COVID-19.
- Clarrie Jeffreys, 88, Australian rugby league player (Balmain, Newtown) and coach.
- László Kamuti, 80, Hungarian Olympic fencer (1960, 1964, 1968, 1972).
- Ivan Keats, 83, New Zealand Olympic long-distance runner (1964).
- Don Kidd, 82, American politician, member of the New Mexico Senate (1993–2005), pancreatic cancer.
- A. R. Lakshmanan, 78, Indian jurist, judge of the Supreme Court (2002–2007) and Chairman of the Law Commission (2006–2009), cardiac arrest.
- Lee Wai Chun, Hong Kong comics artist.
- Archana Mahanta, 71, Indian folk singer, complications from a stroke.
- Osamu Masuko, 71, Japanese business executive, heart failure.
- Eugene McCabe, 90, Irish novelist and playwright.
- David Mercer, 70, British sports commentator and tennis umpire.
- William Neikirk, 82, American journalist and author, COVID-19.
- Lute Olson, 85, American Hall of Fame college basketball coach (Arizona Wildcats, Iowa Hawkeyes, Long Beach State 49ers).
- Robert Manley Parker, 82, American jurist, Judge (1979–1994) and Chief Judge (1990–1994) of the E.D. Tex., Judge of the U.S. Court of Appeals for the Fifth Circuit (1994–2002).
- Vejaynand Ramlakan, 62, South African military officer, Surgeon General of the South African Military Health Service (2005–2013), heart attack.
- Dick Ritger, 81, American ten-pin bowler.
- Arnaldo Saccomani, 71, Brazilian record producer and reality television judge (Ídolos, Qual é o Seu Talento?), complications from kidney failure and diabetes.
- Melissa Shook, 81, American documentary photographer and artist, glioblastoma.
- Martin Short, 76, British documentary producer and author, cancer.
- Peter Sova, 75, Czech-born American cinematographer (Donnie Brasco, Good Morning, Vietnam, Lucky Number Slevin).
- Barry Stuart, 86, Australian Olympic canoeist (1956, 1960, 1964, 1968).
- Ebru Timtik, 42, Turkish human rights lawyer, suicide by fasting.
- Ivar Ueland, 77, Norwegian politician.
- Masud Yunus, 68, Indonesian politician, mayor of Mojokerto (2013–2018), COVID-19.

=== 28 ===
- Gudrun Arenander, 99, Swedish Olympic discus thrower (1948) and handball player.
- Don Bacon, 94, New Zealand microbiologist.
- Chadwick Boseman, 43, American actor (Black Panther, 42, Marshall), Emmy winner (2022), complications from colon cancer.
- David S. Cass Sr., 78, American film director (Avenging Angel, Desolation Canyon, Thicker than Water) and stuntman, complications from cancer.
- Catherine D'Ovidio, 61, French bridge player.
- Jean-Pierre Dickès, 78, French historian and doctor.
- John P. Dobyns, 76, American politician, member of the Wisconsin State Assembly (1993–1999), liver disease.
- Frederick T. Ernst, 97, American politician, member of the New Hampshire House of Representatives (1978–1982).
- Marian Garfinkel, 88, American yoga teacher, organ failure.
- Mike Joyce, 81, American golfer, complications from Parkinson's disease.
- Randall Kenan, 57, American writer (A Visitation of Spirits).
- Rahat Khan, 79, Bangladeshi journalist and novelist.
- Shiro Kishibe, 71, Japanese actor (Monkey), heart failure.
- Jan Klenberg, 88, Finnish admiral, Chief of Defence (1990–1994).
- Assar Lindbeck, 90, Swedish economist.
- Marion Moses, 84, American physician, nurse, and labor activist.
- Keith Dwayne Nelson, 45, American convicted murderer, execution by lethal injection.
- Art Plotnik, 82–83, American librarian and photographer.
- Julia Evans Reed, 58, American author and journalist, cancer.
- Seymour I. Schwartz, 92, American surgeon and writer (Schwartz's Principles of Surgery).
- Antoinette Spaak, 92, Belgian politician, President of the Parliament of the French Community (1988–1992).
- Wolfgang Stahl, 64, German spectroscopist.
- Uli Stein, 73, German cartoonist.
- Manuel Valdés, 89, Mexican comedian and actor (A Thousand and One Nights, Tom Thumb and Little Red Riding Hood, La leyenda de la Nahuala), cancer.
- H. Vasanthakumar, 70, Indian politician, Tamil Nadu MLA (2016–2019) and MP (since 2019), COVID-19.
- Lou Westende, 94, Australian politician, ACT MLA (1992–1994).

=== 29 ===
- Vladimir Andreyev, 90, Russian actor (True Friends, The Tale of Tsar Saltan, The Circus Princess), People's Artist of the USSR (1985).
- Tom Berryhill, 67, American politician, member of the California State Senate (2010–2018) and Assembly (2006–2010).
- Fritz Chervet, 77, Swiss boxer, European flyweight champion (1972, 1973).
- John Fainter, 81, American politician.
- Ali Ghandour, 89, Lebanese-Jordanian civil aviation executive.
- Satnam Khattra, 31, Indian fitness trainer and bodybuilder, heart attack.
- James F. Leonard, 100, American diplomat, Ambassador to the United Nations (1977–1979).
- David Mungoshi, 71, Zimbabwean writer.
- S. I. Padmavati, 103, Burmese-born Indian cardiologist, COVID-19.
- Ramdeo Rai, 77, Indian politician, Bihar MLA (1972–1985, since 2005).
- Domingo Rivas, 87, Venezuelan Olympic racing cyclist (1956).
- Clifford Robinson, 53, American basketball player (Portland Trail Blazers, Phoenix Suns) and reality television personality (Survivor: Cagayan), lymphoma.
- Shafaullah Rokhri, Pakistani singer, cardiac arrest.
- Jürgen Schadeberg, 89, German-born South African photographer, stroke.
- Subzero, 31, Australian racehorse, Melbourne Cup winner (1992), euthanized.
- Serjik Teymourian, 46, Armenian-Iranian footballer (Esteghlal, Mainz 05), traffic collision.
- Viktor Tikhonov, 71, Ukrainian politician, Vice Prime Minister (2010–2011), pneumonia.
- Daniel I.C. Wang, 84, American chemical engineer.

=== 30 ===
- Rodolfo Abularach, 87, Guatemalan painter.
- Virginia Bosler, 93, American actress and dancer (Oklahoma!, Brigadoon, Out of This World).
- Ric Drasin, 76, American bodybuilder, professional wrestler (NWA Hollywood Wrestling), promoter and trainer.
- Ángel Faus Belau, 84, Spanish journalist and academic (University of Navarra).
- Ralph Ferguson, 90, Canadian politician, MP (1980–1984, 1988–1993), Minister of Agriculture (1984).
- Lance Finch, 82, Canadian jurist.
- Jacques Galipeau, 96, Canadian actor (The Pyx, Bingo, Black List).
- Nikos Gelestathis, 90, Greek politician, Minister of Transport and Communications (1990–1992) and Public Order (1992–1993), MP (1981–2004).
- Gordon William Hanson, 77, Canadian politician.
- Marguerite Harl, 101, French literary scholar.
- Joan Houchen, 90, American politician.
- Keith Lampard, 74, American baseball player (Houston Astros).
- Dick Leahy, 83, British music executive.
- Ann Lynn, 86, British actress (Flame in the Streets, Strongroom, A Shot in the Dark).
- Ellen Elizabeth Reed, 104, Canadian-born British-New Zealand codebreaker.
- Cecilia Romo, 74, Mexican actress (Prófugas del destino, Como tú no hay 2), COVID-19.
- Ingrid Stahmer, 77, German politician.
- John Thompson, 78, American Hall of Fame basketball player (Boston Celtics) and coach (Georgetown Hoyas), national champion (1984), NBA champion (1965, 1966).
- Ricardo Valderrama Fernández, 75, Peruvian anthropologist and politician, Mayor of Cusco Province (since 2019), COVID-19.
- Jean Vezin, 87, French historian.

=== 31 ===
- Jeanne Baird, 93, American actress (Ben Jerrod, The Gay Deceivers, Andy Hardy Comes Home).
- Nina Bocharova, 95, Ukrainian gymnast, Olympic champion (1952).
- Al Bodine, 92, American football player (Saskatchewan Roughriders).
- Haldun Boysan, 62, Turkish actor (On Board, Robbery Alla Turca, The Jackal), heart attack.
- Jerilyn Lee Brandelius, 72, American rock and roll tour director (Grateful Dead), photographer and author (The Grateful Dead Family Album), heart failure.
- Fritz d'Orey, 82, Brazilian racing driver, cancer.
- Jack Danzey, 81, Australian rugby league player (Newtown, Balmain, Cronulla-Sutherland) and referee.
- P. R. Dubhashi, 90, Indian civil servant and social scientist.
- John Felagha, 26, Nigerian footballer (Eupen).
- Larry Graham, 77, American college basketball coach.
- Larry Hedrick, 79, American businessman, leukemia.
- Barbara Judge, 73, American-British lawyer and businesswoman, pancreatic cancer.
- Pascal Kané, 74, French film director and screenwriter.
- Édouard Karemera, 69, Rwandan politician and convicted war criminal.
- Hans A. Linde, 96, German-born American judge and legal scholar, Justice of the Oregon Supreme Court (1977–1990).
- Pietro Mário, 81, Italian-born Brazilian actor (Memórias Póstumas), cardiac arrest.
- Ronnie McNutt, 33, American veteran, suicide by gunshot.
- Massoud Mehrabi, 66, Iranian journalist, writer and caricaturist; heart attack.
- Jean Baptiste Mendy, 57, Senegalese-born French boxer, WBC (1996–1997) and WBA lightweight champion (1998–1999), pancreatic cancer.
- Sydney Meshkov, 93, American theoretical physicist.
- Pranab Mukherjee, 84, Indian politician, President (2012–2017), Minister of Defence (2004–2006) and MP (1969–2012), septic shock.
- Pak Kyong-suk, 99, North Korean politician, Deputy (1962–1972).
- Don Parkinson, 77–78, American politician, Speaker of the Guam Legislature (1995–1997).
- Michael Redhead, 90, British philosopher of science.
- Miloš Říha, 61, Czech ice hockey player (Dukla Jihlava, Vítkovice Ridera) and coach (national team).
- David Rothman, 83, American professor of social medicine, cancer.
- Tom Seaver, 75, American Hall of Fame baseball player (New York Mets, Cincinnati Reds, Chicago White Sox), complications from Lewy body dementia and COVID-19.
- Norm Spencer, 62, Canadian voice actor (X-Men, Rescue Heroes, Silver Surfer).
- Yvonne, Lady Cochrane, 98, Lebanese aristocrat (Sursock family), philanthropist and advocate of the arts, injuries sustained in the 2020 Beirut explosion.
- Bent Vejlby, 96, Danish actor (Dronningens vagtmester, Flådens friske fyre).
- Morris Wijesinghe, 78, Sri Lankan musician.
- Rich Wolfe, 78, American sportswriter, throat cancer.
- Gérard Worms, 84, French banker.
- Megan Wraight, 58, New Zealand landscape architect, cancer.
