= Beverley Jackson =

American writer (1928–2020)

- Born: November 20, 1928; Los Angeles, California, U.S.
- Died: August 6, 2020 (aged 91)
- Occupations: Novelist; columnist; lecturer; curator
- Writing career
- Genre: Literature
- Website: beverleyjackson.com

Beverley Jackson (November 20, 1928 – August 6, 2020) was an American writer on Chinese culture and fashion, as well as international travel, polo and style. Her published works cover life in 1920s and 1930s. She published a book called Dolls of Spain in 2017. As a freelance writer, her articles were published in The New York Times, Los Angeles Times, Vogue Paris, British Vogue, US Vogue, and Time. Jackson lectured around the world, including at the Victoria and Albert Museum, Museum of Art Shanghai, and Civilization Museum Singapore. She was a featured speaker at the Shanghai International Writers Conference 2006. Jackson was a curator of Chinese textiles at the Santa Barbara Historical Museum for 20 years, and was a collector of Chinese imperial robes since 1975. She wove pine needle baskets exhibited at Casa Gallery and her collages had three major exhibitions in Santa Barbara galleries. Jackson also wrote a weekly column for The Voice.

== Biography ==
Beverley Jackson was born to Dorothy and Philip Jacobson in Los Angeles, California, on November 20, 1928. She grew up in Los Angeles, graduating from Westlake School for Girls in 1946. She attended UCLA, USC, Otis Art Institute, and Kahn Art Institute.

In 1963, Jackson moved to Santa Barbara, California, and for almost 25 years wrote the tri-weekly column "By the Way" for the Santa Barbara News-Press. She was the winner of the California Photography Contest of the Los Angeles Times.

Jackson has lectured on the subjects of her published works for over 10 years in cities around the world.

Jackson began collecting Chinese textiles in 1975 during a trip to Shanghai. Her collection of Qing textiles, especially the imperial robes, became known internationally and were exhibited in special museums on occasion including the Pacific Asia Museum in Pasadena.

== Published works ==
- Splendid Slippers – 1998 Ten Speed Press. Winner of the Bookbuilders West 1998 Judge's Choice Award.
- Ladder to the Clouds: Intrigues and Traditions of Chinese Rank coauthored by Dr. David Hugus- 1999 Ten Speed Press. Runner-up Winner of the Kiriyama Pacific Rim Book Awards 2000
- Kingfisher Blue – 2001 Ten Speed Press
- Shanghai Girl Gets All Dressed Up – 2005 Ten Speed Press
- 1910 A Grand Tour of Asia coauthored by Hania Tallmadge – 2006 Ten Speed Press
- The Beautiful Lady Was A Palace Eunuch – 2011 Create Space
