= Bernard Zimmern =

French businessman (1930–2020)

- Born: 8 June 1930
- Died: 19 August 2020 (aged 90); Neuilly-sur-Seine, France
- Occupation: Businessman

Bernard Zimmern (8 June 1930 – 19 August 2020) was a French businessman. He notably founded the Fondation pour la recherche sur les administrations et les politiques publiques (IFRAP).

== Biography ==
Zimmern graduated from the École Polytechnique in 1949 and the École nationale d'administration in 1955. He worked for Renault for six years, then ten years at Cegos as Director of Research and Development. He founded the companies Omphale and Single Screw Compressor Inc. in the United States to sell his screw compressors, for which he held over 500 patents.

Zimmern's experience in America helped him discover the think tank and the role they play in civil society and the economy. In 1985, he founded IFRAP using his own funds to research public policies. He served as Honorary President of IFRAP until 2012. The think tank was registered as a public interest representative in the French National Assembly, discontinuing its status as a scientific research body.

Zimmern was a co-founder of Contribuables associés. In 2012, he founded the "Emploi 2017" website, aimed at fighting restrictions on business in France to develop total employment in the country. That same year, he founded the Institut de recherche pour la démographie des entreprises. He was a member of the Carrefour de l'Horloge.

In 1999, Zimmern received the Prix Renaissance de l'économie, awarded by Cercle renaissance for his founding of IFRAP. In 1977, he received a Gold Medal from the Institute of Refrigeration in London for his contributions to the refrigeration industry. In 2015, he received the Prix Grammaticakis-Neumann of the Académie des Sciences Morales et Politiques.

Zimmern died in Neuilly-sur-Seine on 19 August 2020 at the age of 90.

== Books ==
- Développement de l'entreprise et innovation (1969)
- À tout fonctionnaire son chômeur (1999)
- Les Profiteurs de l'État (2001)
- Les Fabricants de chômage (2002)
- La Dictature des syndicats : FO, CGT, SUD... nos nouveaux maîtres (2003)
- Changer Bercy pour changer la France : les riches sont la solution, pas le problème (2015)
