= Pascal Martin =

French journalist (1952–2020)

- Born: 1952
- Died: 3 August 2020 (aged 67–68)
- Occupations: Journalist; Writer

Pascal Martin (1952 – 3 August 2020) was a French journalist and writer.

== Biography ==
In the 1980s, Martin co-created the Agence de diffusion de l'information (ADIR) and produced a series of films on the Lebanese Civil War in Beirut, the trafficking of skeletons in Kolkata, and Ruhollah Khomeini's rise to power. At the start of the 1990s, he joined France 2 as a reporter. In the 2000s, he created the series Dans le secret de... alongside Jacques Cotta, which produced over forty issues. In 2015, he launched his book series, titled Le monde selon Cobus.

Martin's death was announced on the evening news broadcast on France 2 on 3 August 2020.

== Bibliography ==
- Dans le secret des sectes (1992)
- Le Trésor du Magounia
- L'Archange du médoc
- L'ogre des Landes
- La vallée des cobayes
- Le seigneur des atolls
- La Traque des maîtres flamands
- La malédiction de Tévennec
- Les Fantômes du mur païen
- Le Bonsaï de Brocéliande
- Du danger de perdre patience en faisant son plein d'essence (2015)
- Bienvenue dans le Bronx (2016)
- La Reine noire (2018)
- L'Affaire Perceva (2019)

== Filmography ==
- Front national la nébuleuse (Envoyé spécial)
- Dans le secret de ...
