= Lance Castles =

Australian scholar (1937–2020)

Lance Castles (5 January 1937 – 27 August 2020) was an Australian scholar of Indonesian history, economics, and politics.

== Biography ==
Born in Kyneton, Victoria, he studied politics and economic history at the University of Melbourne. Under Australia's Volunteer Graduate Scheme he taught in the faculty of economics at the University of Indonesia in the 1960s. He completed a master's degree at Monash University and a doctorate at Yale University in 1972.

After completing his doctorate, Castles was briefly a research fellow at Australian National University before taking on a role at Syiah Kuala University in Banda Aceh, Indonesia. He moved to Jakarta in 1982 to become head of the postgraduate program at the University of Indonesia, then moving to Yogyakarta in 1988 to teach at Gadjah Mada University. Castles returned to Melbourne in 2000 and retired from academia. He died at an aged-care facility in the suburb of Kew. Castles collaborated with Herbert Feith in a number of publications about the Indonesian political history in the 1940s to 1960s. The Castles collection is held at Monash University.

== Selected works ==
Lance Castles (1967), Religion, politics, and economic behavior in Java the Kudus cigarette industry, Cellar Book Shop

Benda, Harry Jindrich; Castles, Lance, 1937- (1969), The Samin movement, Yale University, Southeast Asia Studies
