= Alexandre Keresztessy =

Belgian film director (1939–2020)

- Born: 15 March 1939; Budapest, Kingdom of Hungary
- Died: 1 August 2020 (aged 81)
- Occupations: Director; Reporter

Alexandre Keresztessy (15 March 1939 – 1 August 2020) was a Hungarian-born Belgian director and news reporter. He was notable for his knowledge of the folklore of the French Community of Belgium.

== Biography ==
Born in Budapest, Keresztessy began working for RTBF in 1960. He also collaborated with Cing colonnes à la une, and produced shows for TV5Monde and Arte.

Beginning in 1970, Keresztessy specialized in folklore, tourism, and ethnology, particularly focusing on Wallonia. He regularly worked with René and Serge Meurant. He shot his productions with 16 mm film, some of which have been featured at documentary film festivals, such as the Cinéma du réel in Paris and the États généraux du film documentaire in Lussas. At the start of the 1990s, Keresztessy directed the "Vie et Traditions populaire" program series on RTBF.

Alexandre Keresztessy died on 1 August 2020 at the age of 81.
