= Frederick T. Ernst =

American politician (1922–2020)

Member of the New Hampshire House of Representatives from the Cheshire 8th district
- In office December 6, 1978 – December 1, 1982 Serving with Clayton H. Crane
- Preceded by: Stephen H. Krause; Anne B. Gordon
- Succeeded by: Jesse F. Davis

Personal details
- Born: September 13, 1922
- Died: August 28, 2020 (aged 97)
- Party: Republican
- Education: Harvard College (AB)

Frederick T. Ernst (September 13, 1922 – August 28, 2020) was an American politician. He served as a Republican member for the Cheshire 8th district of the New Hampshire House of Representatives.
