= Jenny Tone-Pah-Hote =

American Kiowa academic (1980–2020)

- Born: 1980
- Died: August 8, 2020 (aged 40)
- Occupation: Historian
- Spouse: Keith Richotte
- Children: 1

Academic background
- Education: University of Missouri; University of Minnesota
- Thesis: Envisioning Nationhood: Kiowa Expressive Culture, 1875-1939 (2009)
- Doctoral advisor: Jean O'Brien

Academic work
- Discipline: Native American studies
- Sub-discipline: History of the Kiowa
- Institutions: University of North Carolina at Chapel Hill

Jenny Tone-Pah-Hote (1980 – August 8, 2020) was an American Kiowa academic. She was a professor at the University of North Carolina at Chapel Hill, where she taught Native American studies, and she was the author of Crafting an Indigenous Nation: Kiowa Expressive Culture in the Progressive Era (2019), a finalist for the 2020 Lora Romero First Book Publication Prize.

== Biography ==
She was born in 1980 to Debbie and Preston Tone-Pah-Hote, a Kiowa Indian Tribe of Oklahoma storyteller. Her grandfather Murray Tone-Pah-Hote was a silversmith and her great-grandmother Tahdo Ahtone was a cradleboard artist. She was raised in Orrick, Missouri, and graduated from Orrick High School in 1998.

She studied at the University of Missouri on a Ronald E. McNair Scholarship, where she got a BA in History (2001), before moving on to the University of Minnesota, where she got a PhD in History (2009). Her doctoral dissertation Envisioning Nationhood: Kiowa Expressive Culture, 1875-1939 was supervised by Jean O'Brien. She later joined the University of North Carolina at Chapel Hill (UNC) in 2009, where after starting out as a postdoctoral fellow, she was later promoted to assistant professor and eventually associate professor. At UNC, she taught courses on Native American studies, one of which focused on the Kiowa people.

As an academic, she specialized in Native American history and culture. In 2017, she was appointed the University of Missouri's first Cherng Distinguished Scholar, so on November 2, she held the lecture "We’ll Show You Boys How to Dance: Kiowa Dance and Painting, 1928-1940", based on research she did for a book project. In January 2019, she published Crafting an Indigenous Nation: Kiowa Expressive Culture in the Progressive Era, a book on the history of Kiowa identity; it was one of three finalists for the 2020 Lora Romero First Book Publication Prize. In July 2019, as part of her research, she made a visit to the Museum of the Great Plains.

In 2020, she was hospitalized for leukemia; she died from the illness on August 8, 2020.

She has a son, who was four at the time of his mother's death. Her husband Keith Richotte is an academic.

She was a citizen of the Kiowa Indian Tribe of Oklahoma.

== Bibliography ==
- Crafting an Indigenous Nation: Kiowa Expressive Culture in the Progressive Era (2020)
