= Bernard Sapoval =

French physicist (1937–2020)

- Born: 30 October 1937; Paris
- Died: 26 August 2020 (aged 82); Paris, France
- Occupation: Physicist

Bernard Sapoval (30 October 1937 – 26 August 2020) was a French physicist. He was known for his work in semi-conductors, and fractals.

== Biography ==
An engineer, Sapoval graduated from ESPCI Paris in 1960. He continued his studies at the École Polytechnique to study the fields of magnetic resonance of semiconductors.

Beginning in 1970, Sapoval was a professor at the École Polytechnique. In 1976, he became director of the condensed matter physics lab at the school. In 1978, he became president of the physics department. In 1997, he began working at the École normale supérieure Paris-Saclay and served as research director of the French National Centre for Scientific Research.

In the 1970s, he met Benoit Mandelbrot and began studying fractals, which he researched on the coast of Brittany. In 1997, he published Universalité et Fractales, Jeux d'enfants ou délits d'initié, which made fractal geometry more accessible to the general public and won him the Prix de la Culture scientifique in 1998. In 2003, he received the Grand Prix de l'innovation for his research on the fractal wall. In 1995, he was made a Fellow of the American Physical Society.

Bernard Sapoval died on 26 August 2020 in Paris at the age of 82.

== Publications ==
- Physique des semi-conducteurs (1984)
- Les fractales (1990)
- Physique des semi-conducteurs (1991)
- Physics of semiconductors (1995)
- Universalités et fractales, jeux d’enfant ou délits d’initié (1997)
- Universalités et fractales (2001)
- Elements of semiconductor physics (2002)
