= Peter Rees (rugby union, born 1925) =

Welsh rugby union player

- Born: 8 February 1925 Penygroes, Wales
- Died: 7 August 2020 (aged 95) Pembrey, Wales
- School: Gwendraeth Grammar School
- Occupation: Mechanical engineer

Rugby union career
- Position: Wing
International career
| Years | Team | Apps | (Points) |
| 1947 | Wales | 2 | (0) |

Peter Rees (8 February 1925 — 7 August 2020) was a Welsh international rugby union player.

Born in Penygroes, Rees attended Gwendraeth Grammar School, which he left at the age of 14 to work at the Cross Hands coal mine.

Rees, a winger, played briefly with Tumble before joining Llanelli in 1945. He was Llanelli's top try-scorer in each of his first two seasons and won two Wales caps during the 1947 Five Nations, playing in wins over France at Colombes and Ireland at home. Returning to Tumble, Rees was team captain in the 1952-53 season, then finished his playing career back at his home club Penygroes.

A mechanical engineer, Rees remained involved in rugby as an administrator, serving as both chairman and president of Llanelli. He died in 2020 at the age of 95, having been the oldest living Wales international for seven years.

== See also ==
- List of Wales national rugby union players
