= Kuo Mei-chiang =

Taiwanese actress (1953–2020)

- Born: 1953
- Died: 4 August 2020 (aged 66–67); Guishan, Taoyuan, Taiwan
- Occupation: Pastor

Kuo Mei-chiang (Chinese: 郭美江; 1953 – 4 August 2020) was a Taiwanese pastor. Her opposition to LGBT rights led to the Kuo Mei-chiang incident in 2013. In the past she served in the CRC Lihebo Church of Hongkong and most recently the Taipei Pure Gospel Church. Her statements and teachings were discussed online, and she became known as MC Mei-chiang.

Kuo died in Linkou Chang Gung Memorial Hospital on 4 August 2020.
