= Charles K. Heiden =

US Army major general (1925–2020)

- Born: July 7, 1925; Detroit, Michigan, U.S.
- Died: August 7, 2020 (aged 95); Louisville, Kentucky, U.S.
- Military career
- Allegiance: United States
- Branch: United States Army
- Service years: 1943–1945; 1949–1981
- Rank: Major general
- Commands: United States Army Military Personnel Center; Fort Dix

Charles Kenneth Heiden (July 7, 1925 - August 7, 2020) was a major general in the United States Army, who served as the Commanding General of Fort Dix from 1980 to 1981. He graduated from the United States Military Academy in 1949.

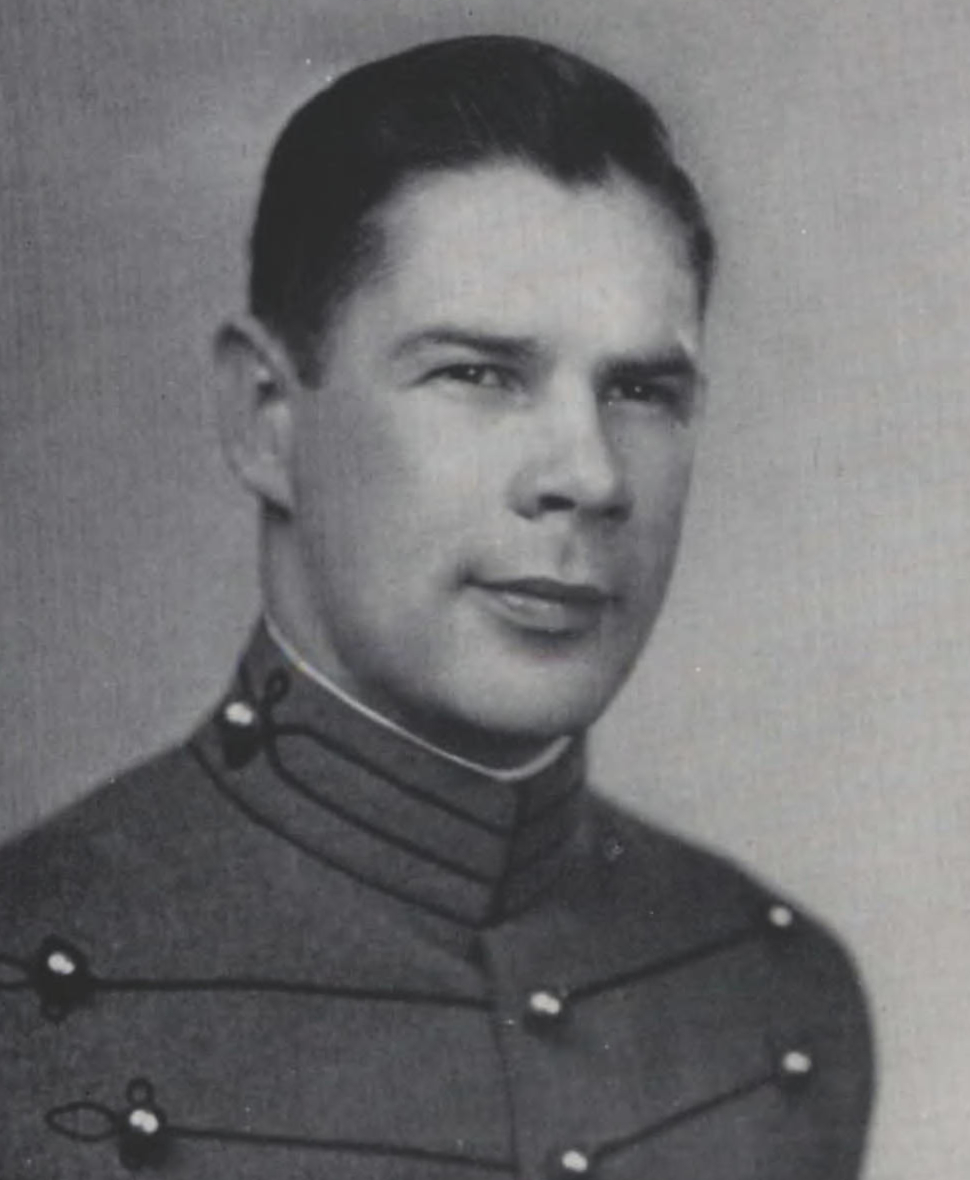
Heiden as a United States Military Academy cadet c. 1949
