= Ali Dastmalchian =

Iranian academic (1954–2020)

- Born: 27 October 1954; Iran
- Died: 13 August 2020 (aged 65); Canada
- Occupations: Dean and professor

Academic background
- Education: BSc., National University of Iran; MSc., PhD, Cardiff University

Ali Dastmalchian (27 October 1954 - 13 August 2020) was a Dean and Professor in the Beedie School of Business at Simon Fraser University (SFU). He was also the President and Chair of the Global Leadership & Organizational Behaviour Effectiveness (GLOBE) Foundation. Before joining SFU, Dastmalchian served as dean at the University of Victoria and University of Lethbridge.

== Education and early career ==
Dastmalchian earned his Bachelor of Science from the National University of Iran and Masters and PhD at Cardiff University.

Dastmalchian spent years managing sales and international business in the Middle East and Europe, including designing executive development programs throughout Asia and the Middle East.

== Career ==
In the 1990s, Dastmalchian, Robert J. House, and Mansour Javidan created the Global Leadership & Organisational Behaviour Effectiveness (GLOBE) project. He later joined the University of Alberta and University of Saskatchewan faculty.

From 1997 until 2002, Dastmalchian served as dean of the Faculty of Management at the University of Lethbridge. He subsequently joined the University of Victoria as dean of their Gustavson School of Business. In 2004, he was named to the BC Venture Society Board. Under his leadership, the Gustavson School of Business was accredited by the Association to Advance Collegiate Schools of Business. By 2011, he was nominated for the BC Council of International Education Awards.

He stayed at the University of Victoria until 2016, when he joined the faculty at Simon Fraser University as Dean of the Beedie School of Business. Dastmalchian died on 13 August 2020.

== Selected publications ==
The following is a list of his selected publications:

- Culture specific and cross-culturally generalizable implicit leadership theories: are attributes of charismatic/transformational leadership universally endorsed? (1999)
- The interplay between organisational and national cultures: a comparison of organisational practices in Canada and South Korea using the Competing Values Framework (2000)
