= Kosei Eguchi =

Japanese manga artist (1997–2020)

Kosei Eguchi 恵口 公生
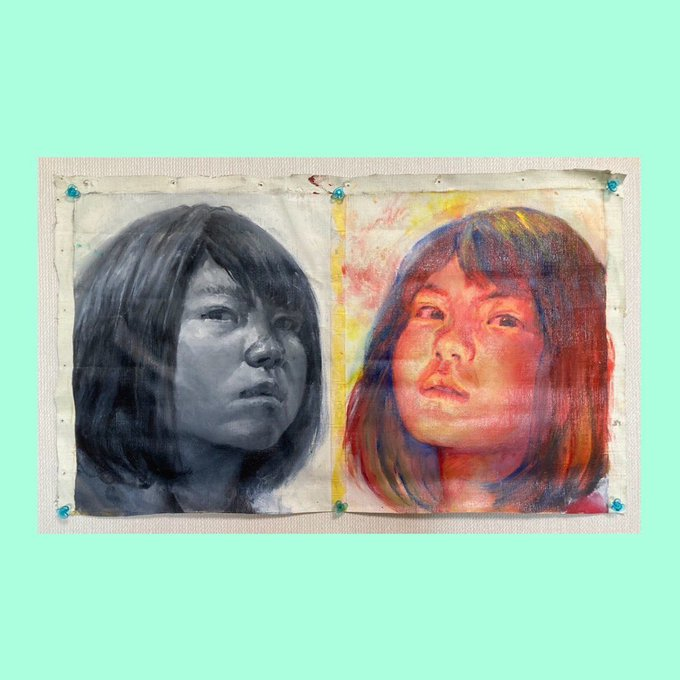
- self-portait
- Born: July 28, 1997
- Died: August 19, 2020 (aged 23)
- Area: Manga artist
- Pseudonym: Peyo
- Notable works: Boy meets Maria, Kimio alive

Kosei Eguchi (Japanese: 恵口 公生, Hepburn: Eguchi Kōsei; July, 28 1997 – August 19, 2020), also known as Peyo, was a Japanese manga artist. She is best known for creating " Boy meets Maria" and "Kimio Alive".

== Biography ==
Kosei Eguchi was born on July 28, 1997. During her childhood, she often played alone, making stories with finger puppets. She liked to draw, and during her time in elementary school, she already drew comic strips. Although she had a good level as a draftsman, she was reluctant to think about it, so she communicated with others through painting. Her family did not agree with her becoming a mangaka, as not all of them could be successful. However, an editor at Printemps Publishing had taken an interest in Eguchi when she was studying oil painting in hopes of entering the Tokyo University of the Arts. She began her professional career in 2017 with the publication of the BL manga, Boy meets Maria, under the pseudonym Peyo.

A Kodansha editor, who read Boy meets Maria, contacted her via Twitter. Subsequently in 2019, he initiated the publication of a new shonen manga titled Kimio Alive in Monthly Shonen Magazine, featuring a high school student who dreams of becoming a YouTuber. For this, she decided to reveal and use her real name. The publication of the manga had problems due to the outbreak of the COVID-19 pandemic in Japan, the state of emergency in Japan, and the lack of promotion in bookstores, which led Kodansha to consider canceling the work after the second volume went on sale. On the same day the volume was published, she was urgently hospitalized; she died on August 19, 2020, at the age of 23, just 2 days after the published day of Kimio Alive volume 2. The third volume was published with the help of her family in her memory. The cause of death was not revealed. As a result, Kimio Alive ceased publication in September 2020.

Besides the manga she published, she is also very famous with the two doujinshi (fan-comic) she made for Rock Lee, a famous character in Naruto, called "バカと天才の夏休み"/ Idiot and Genius' Summer Vacation and "しのびごと"/ Shinobi Secrets . バカと天才の夏休み can be read on her pixiv account.

== Works ==
- Idiot and Genius' Summer Vacation (バカと天才の夏休み) (doujinshi published on Pixiv ) (2016)
- Shinobi Secrets (しのびごと) (doujinshi published on Pixiv ) (2017)
- Boy meets Maria (ボーイミーツマリア, Bōi miitsu Maria) (serialized in Printemps Shuppan) (2018)
- Kimio Alive (キミオアライブ) (serialized in Monthly Shonen Magazine) (2020)
