= Ahmed Badouj =

Moroccan Berber filmmaker (1950–2020)

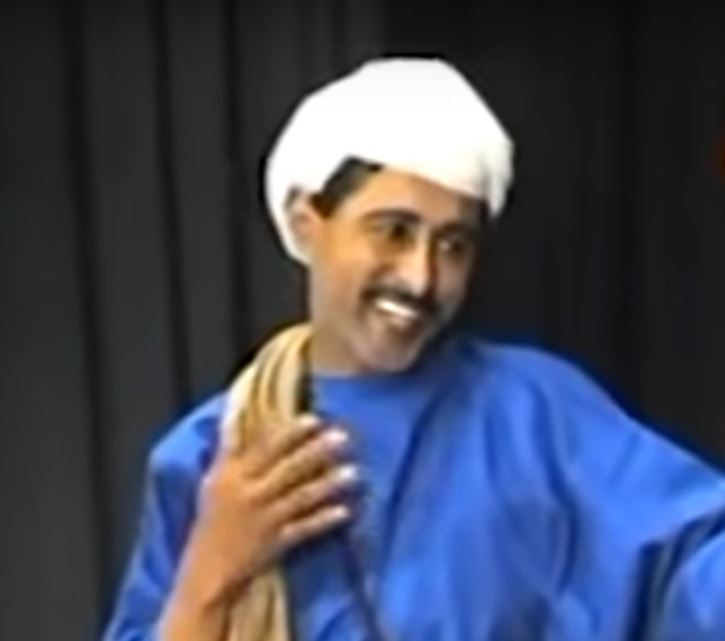
- Born: 1950; Agadir, Morocco
- Died: 22 August 2020 (aged 70); Agadir, Morocco
- Citizenship: Moroccan
- Occupations: Actor, Screenwriter

Ahmed Badouj (1950 – 22 August 2020) was a Moroccan Berber actor, director, screenwriter and man of the theater who was born in 1950 in Mesguina in the village of Ifrkhs (Province of Agadir, Souss-Massa-Drâa).

== Life and career ==
Ahmed Badouj left school, from an early age, he did various odd jobs (painter, carpenter, car electrician) in order to provide for the needs of his poor family, especially his seriously ill father.

In 1978, he began his career in the theater (in Arabic), then joined the first Berber theater troupe "Tifawin" (lights) founded in 1985 by Lahoucine Bouizgaren. Emblematic figure of Berber cinema, he wrote many scenarios and many plays, including the most famous "Tagodi" (The grief), one of the first plays performed by the Tifawin troupe in the 80s, and which will be adapted in 1995 in film by Ahmed Badouj.

In 1992, he played the role of Idder in the first Berber film "Tamghart N'ourgh" (The woman in gold) by Lahoucine Bouizgaren. Under the direction of another pioneer of Berber cinema, Mohamed Mernich, he shoots in several films, including "Asnnane n Tayri" with actress Zahia Zahiri. With Larbi Altit Warda Vision's production company, which has become Warda Production, he also appears in "Tiyiti N'wadan", a two-part drama, in which he is found alongside Ahmed Nassih and Abdellatif Atif, two actors from the "Tifawin" theater company.

More recently, finally, he appeared on the small screen in the television series "Tigmi Mkourn", sitcom directed by Abdelaziz Oussaih and produced by Warda Production alongside other renowned actors such as Lahoucine Bardaouz, Abdellatif Atif and Mbark El Aattach.

== Filmography ==
Year	Title	Role	Director
2008	Houti Houta	Actor	Nassim Abassi
1995	Tagodi	Director, Actor	Ahmed Badouj
1989	Tamghart N'ourgh	Actor in the role of Idder	Lahoucine Bouizgaren

== Death ==
Badouj had diabetes when he tested positive for COVID-19 during the COVID-19 pandemic in Morocco. He died shortly after on 22 August 2020. King Mohammed VI sent a letter of condolence to his family.
