= Cao Chunan =

Chinese scientist (1930–2020)

- 曹楚南
- Born: August 15, 1930; Changshu County, Jiangsu, China
- Died: August 27, 2020 (aged 90); Hangzhou, Zhejiang, China
- Education: Tongji University
- Scientific career
- Fields: Corrosion; Electrochemistry
- Workplaces: Chinese Academy of Sciences (CAS)

Cao Chunan (Chinese: 曹楚南; pinyin: Cáo Chǔnán; August 15, 1930 – August 27, 2020) was a Chinese scientist who specialized in corrosion and electrochemistry. He was a member of the Jiusan Society.

== Biography ==
Cao was born in Changshu County (now Zhangjiagang), Jiangsu, on August 15, 1930. He had five brothers. He secondary studied at Liangfeng High School. In 1948, he was accepted to Tongji University, where he majored in chemistry. After graduation, he was assigned to the CAS Shanghai Branch, in 1952, becoming associate research fellow in 1979 and dean and research fellow in 1982. In 1987, he was transferred to the Institute of Metal Research. He became a professor at Zhejiang University in 1994. In 1999, he concurrently served as dean of College of Environment and Resources, Zhejiang University. He died of illness in Hangzhou, Zhejiang, on August 27, 2020.

== Works ==
- 电化学阻抗谱导论 [Introduction to Electrochemical Impedance Spectroscopy] (in Chinese). Beijing: Science Press. 2016. ISBN 9787030098542.
- 中国材料的自然环境腐蚀 [Natural Environment Corrosion of Chinese Materials] (in Chinese). Beijing: Chemical Industry Press. 2005. ISBN 9787502560317.
- 腐蚀电化学原理 [Principles of Electrochemistry of Corrosion] (in Chinese). Beijing: Chemical Industry Press. 2008. ISBN 9787122020451.

== Papers ==
- "Theoretical errors of linear polarization resistance and a method for reducing them [J]". Corrosion Science. 3: 205–214. 1982.
- Cao, Chu-nan (1990). "On the impedance plane displays for irreversible electrode reactions based on the stability conditions of the steady-state—II. Two state variables besides electrode potential [J]". Electrochimica Acta. 35 (5): 837–844. doi:10.1016/0013-4686(90)90078-E.
- "On electrochemical techniques for interface inhibitor research [J]". Corrosion Science. 38: 0–2082. 1996.
- Cao Chunan; Wang J; Lin H C (1989). "Effect of Cl- ion on the impedance of passive-film-covered electrodes [J]". Journal of Chinese Society for Corrosion & Protection. 9: 261–270.
- Cao Chunan; Lin H (1993). "Corrosion I O, et al. SCC MECHANISM OF AISI 321 IN ACIDIC CHLORIDE SOLUTION [J]". Acta Metallurgica Sinica. 6: 416–420.

== Honours and awards ==
- 1985 May 1 Labor Medal
- 1991 Member of the Chinese Academy of Sciences (CAS)
