= Hervé Blanc =

French actor (1955–2020)

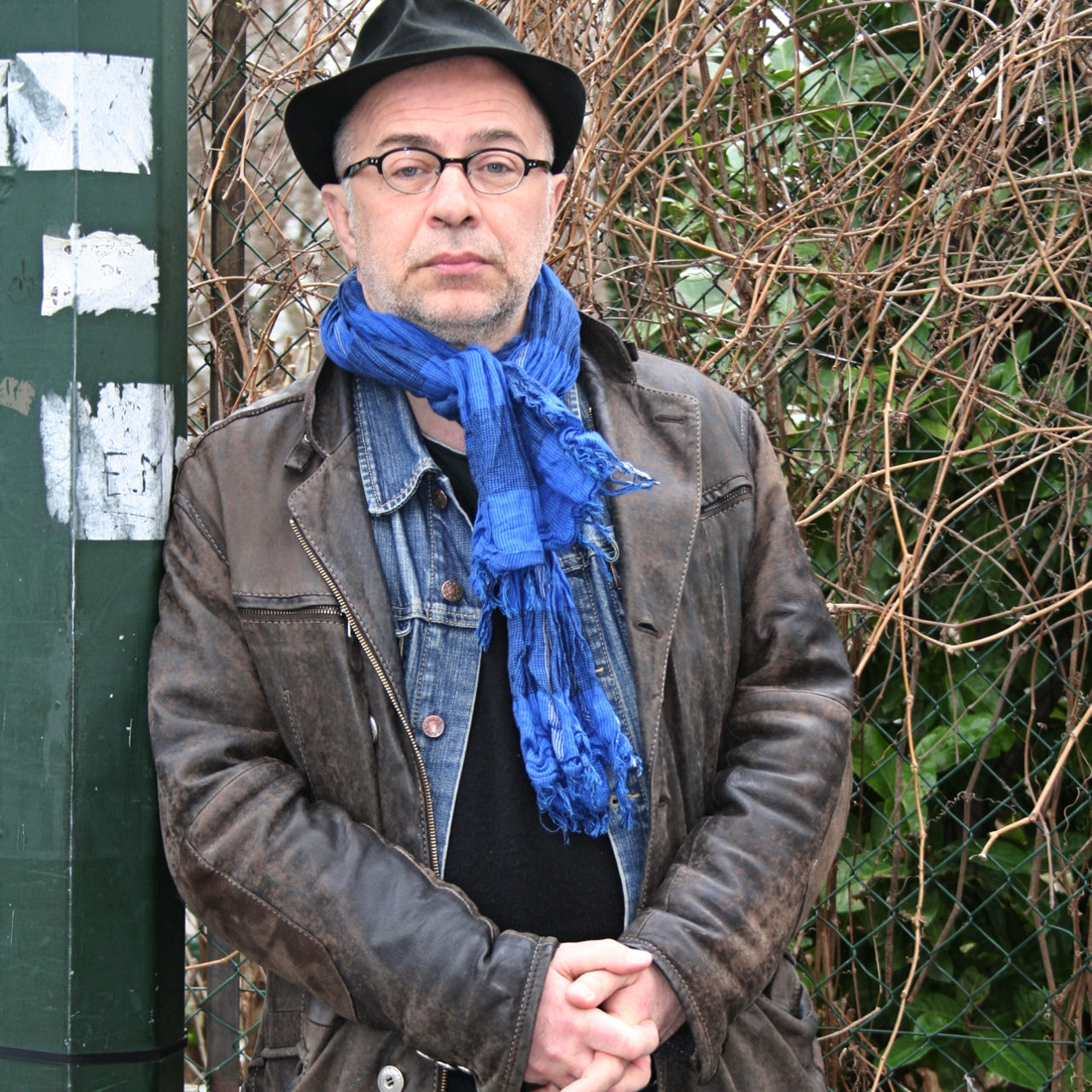
- Blanc in 2010
- Born: 29 January 1955; Lyon, France
- Died: 16 August 2020 (aged 65)
- Occupation: Actor

Hervé Blanc (29 January 1955 – 16 August 2020) was a French actor.

== Filmography ==
=== Feature films ===
- A Week's Vacation (1980)
- L'Été ardent (1982)
- L'émir préfère les blondes (1983)
- Un fils (2003)
- Ceci est mon corps (2014)

=== Medium Length ===
- Les enfants de Pinocchio (2009)

=== Short films ===
- John (1992)
- Au Petit Bonheur (1992)
- Visiteur du soir, espoir (1993)
- Palais Royal (1994)
- Le paradis des infidèles (2001)
- Territoire interdit (2005)
- Terminus Nord (2007)
- Printemps talons aiguilles (2008)
- Les quatres colonnes (2009)

=== Television ===
- Souris Noire (1988)
- Crimes et Jardins (1991)
- Anne Le Guen : Madame la Conseillère (1995)
- L'Institut (2000)
- Lettres d'Algérie (2001)
