= Art Plotnik =

Author and librarian, editor of American Libraries magazine (1937–2020)

Art Plotnik

Arthur Plotnik (1937 - August 28, 2020) was a photographer, journalist, author and librarian, known for being the editor of American Libraries magazine for fifteen years. Plotnik worked for the American Library Association for over twenty years. His photographs covering 23 years of librarians and librarianship are held at the American Library Association Archives.

Before working at ALA, Plotnik worked at the Library of Congress and was a staff writer and reviewer at Albany’s Times-Union. Two of his books The Elements of Editing and The Elements of Expression: Putting Thoughts into Words were Book of the Month Club selections.

== Early life ==
Plotnik was born in 1937 to Annabelle and Mike Plotnik, Russian immigrants. Plotnik graduated from White Plains High School in 1955; he was voted "wittiest" in his class. He earned a BA at Harpur College and a master's degree in English at the University of Iowa, where he studied under Philip Roth.

== Works and publications ==
- Aaron Schmink's first crazy love (2018) ISBN 9781092112154
- Better than great: a plenitudinous compendium of wallopingly fresh superlatives (2013, with Richard Waterhouse) ISBN 9780792788027
- The Elements of Expression: Putting Thoughts into Words (2012, with Jessica Morell) ISBN 9781936740246
- Spunk & bite: a writer's guide to bold, contemporary style (2005) ISBN 9780375722271
- Elements of authorship: from lonely honk to roar of the crowd (2000) ISBN 9780595001194
- The urban tree book: an uncommon field guide for city and town (2000) ISBN 9780812931037
- Honk if you're a writer: unabashed advice, undiluted experience, and unadulterated inspiration for writers and writers-to-be (1992) ISBN 9780671778132
- Man Behind the Quill, Jacob Shallus (1987) ISBN 9780911333589
- The Elements of Editing: A Modern Guide for Editors and Journalists (1982) ISBN 9780585059853
- Library Life--American Style: A Journalist's Field Report (1975) ISBN 9780810808522
