= R. Venkataraman (Indian cricketer) =

Indian cricketer (died 2020)

Personal information
- Died: 6 August 2020 (aged 86)
- Source: Cricinfo, 9 August 2020

R. Venkataraman (date of birth unknown, died 6 August 2020) was an Indian cricketer. He played in three first-class matches for Madhya Pradesh and in two matches for Vidarbha between 1954 and 1963.
