= Robert J. Sunell =

United States army general (1929–2020)

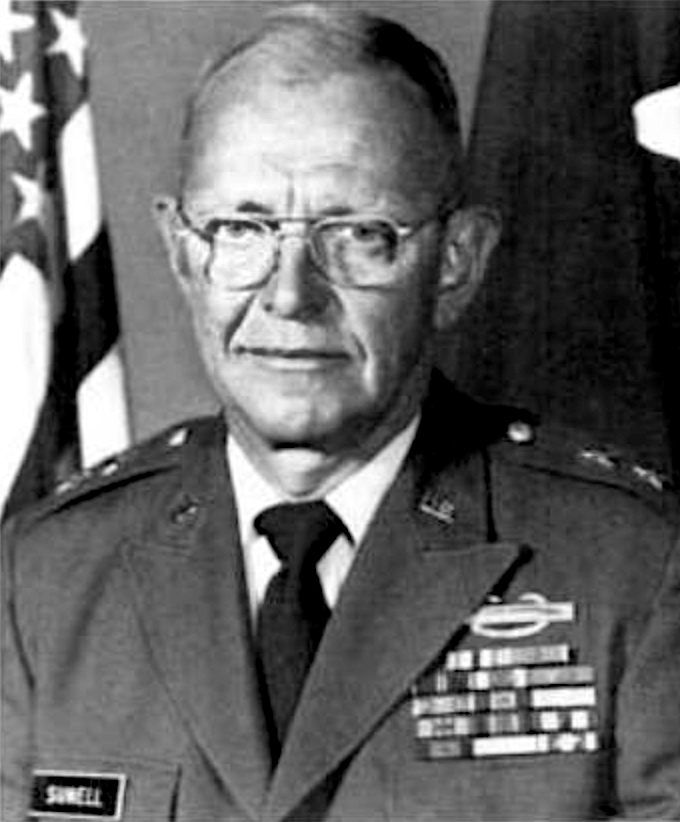
- Born: 5 June 1929; Astoria, Oregon U.S.
- Died: 8 August 2020 (aged 91)
- Military career
- Allegiance: United States
- Branch: United States Army
- Service years: 1953–1988
- Rank: Major general
- Commands: Program Manager, Tank Systems, United States Army Tank-Automotive Command

Robert John Sunell (5 June 1929 – 8 August 2020) was a major general in the United States Army. His assignments included Program Manager of Tank Systems for the United States Army Tank-Automotive Command. Sunell was born in Astoria, Oregon. He received his bachelor's degree in education from University of Nebraska and his masters of science degree from Shippensburg University of Pennsylvania.
