= Peter Kazembe =

Malawian pediatrician (1954–2020)

Peter Nicholas Kazembe (August 28, 1954 – August 11, 2020) was a Malawian pediatrician, well known internationally for his work in pediatric antiretroviral therapy and treatment of malaria. He was one of the first two pediatricians in the country and was often considered the "grandfather of pediatrics" in Malawi. He is credited with publishing over 250 journal articles in his field. He was the Director of the Baylor International Pediatric Program and an associate professor at University of North Carolina at Chapel Hill. Prior to this, he played a role in pioneering Malawi's pediatric HIV/AIDS care treatment guidelines, and was also the Director of Malawi's first HIV clinic and Chief of Pediatrics at Kamuzu Central Hospital.

== Biography ==
Kazembe was born in Malawi. He received his degree in medicine from the University of Manchester in the United Kingdom. Kazembe received his medical degree in pediatrics from the University of Toronto.

He later became the Director, Baylor International Pediatric Program in Lilongwe, Malawi and was an associate professor with Baylor College. He was the founding member of the Baylor College of Medicine International Pediatric AIDS initiative. He was also an associate professor with the University of North Carolina at Chapel Hill's Institute for Global Health and Infectious Disease. He also served as an editor for the International Journal of Tuberculosis and Lung Disease. He was a member of the American Board of Internal Medicine, Internal Medicine and American Board of Internal Medicine, Infectious Diseases. He was married to spouse Hilda and had three children, Tiyanjana, Mwayi and Chesiyao.

== Awards ==
- 2020 Hillman Olness Award for Global Health, American Academy of Pediatrics

== Selected bibliography ==
- John R. Dyer, Peter Kazembe, Pietro L. Vernazza, Bruce L. Gilliam, Martin Maida, Dick Zimba, Irving F. Hoffman, Rachel A. Royce, Jody L. Schock, Susan A. Fiscus, Myron S. Cohen, Joseph J. Eron, Jr., High Levels of Human Immunodeficiency Virus Type 1 in Blood and Semen of Seropositive Men in Sub-Saharan Africa, The Journal of Infectious Diseases, Volume 177, Issue 6, June 1998, Pages 1742–1746, High Levels of Human Immunodeficiency Virus Type 1 in Blood and Semen of Seropositive Men in Sub-Saharan Africa
- Scott J. Filler, Peter Kazembe, Michael Thigpen, Alan Macheso, Monica E. Parise, Randomized Trial of 2-Dose versus Monthly Sulfadoxine-Pyrimethamine Intermittent Preventive Treatment for Malaria in HIV-Positive and HIV-Negative Pregnant Women in Malawi" The Journal of Infectious Diseases, Volume 194, Issue 3, 1 August 2006, Pages 286–293,
