= Lottie Louise Riekehof =

American interpreter (1920–2020)

Lottie Riekehof
- Photo from Battern High School Yearbook, 1937
- Born: August 13, 1920; Germany
- Died: August 6, 2020 (aged 99); Arlington, Virginia, United States
- Occupations: Interpreter and Educator

Lottie Louise Riekehof (August 13, 1920 – August 6, 2020) was an American Sign Language interpreter, author, and a pioneer in the field of professional sign language interpreting. She wrote one of the first curriculums for interpreter educators, and trained interpreters and interpreter educators all over the world.

== Biography ==
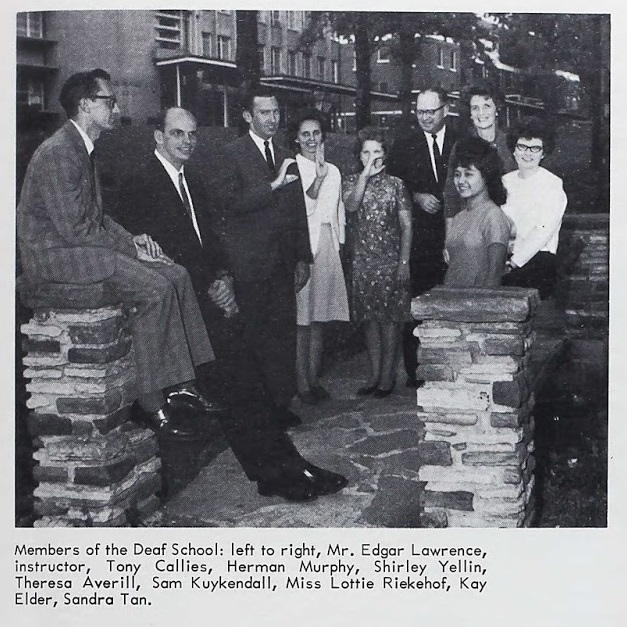
Lottie Riekehof 1962 at the Central Bible College, Springfield, Mo

=== Early life ===
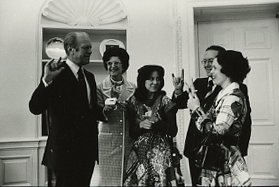
U.S. President Gerald Ford, Robert Griffin, Pamela Young, Ann Billington Bahl, Lottie Louise Riekehof in the Oval office, Apr.1976, presenting the sign language pin saying "I love you"

Lottie Riekehof was born 1920 in Germany to Henry and Laura Riekehof, and was the oldest of four children. In 1923, Riekehof, with her parents and younger sister, Ruth, immigrated from Lage, North Rhine-Westphalia to Elizabeth, New Jersey. After settling, her two younger brothers Henry and Paul were born.

=== Career ===
About 1945, Riekehof started working at Calvary Gospel Church in Washington D.C., working as a missionary overseeing a home for Christian women and as a musician.

From a deaf woman she met at Calvary, she began learning American Sign Language (ASL) a few signs a week.

Later, Riekehof attended ASL courses at Gallaudet College, in 1947-1948 given by Elizabeth Peet.

About this time, Riekehof also worked as a secretary for a chemical company for seven years.

Around 1949, she went to the Central Bible College (CBC) to work for her bachelor's degree.

She interpreted for deaf students and already taught CBC sign language classes. Her students were preparing to become missionaries, full-time ministers, and interpreters for deaf people in hearing churches. It was the first time and place where sign language was offered for college credit. Riekehof paved the way for interpreting to become a recognized profession by realizing the importance of proper education and training in the field. Starting in 1951, she was the dean of women at CBC for 20 years; she also founded the CBC Deaf Program.

She went to New York University, where she obtained her master's degree. After that, she taught sign language there, and worked on her Ph.D. thesis from 1968 to 1970, which was published in 1971.

In 1970, Riekehof returned to Gallaudet College to give sign language courses to graduate students preparing for deaf education. Again, these were the first such courses offered for credit, and she volunteered her time freely to teach the classes.

She served as dean of women at Gallaudet until 1974, when the college abolished that position.

Then, she became the new coordinator for interpreter training for the American Sign Language programs at Gallaudet College.

In 1987, Riekehof became interim chair of the department of communication arts at Gallaudet.

She continued her work at Gallaudet College in the communication department until she retired in 1990.

Riekehof was a long-time resident of Arlington, Virginia. She died on August 6, 2020, one week short of her 100th birthday.

== Books ==
Riekehof knew the resources for learning sign language were extremely limited which led her to write her first book in 1961 called American Sign Language. It was published privately by Wayne Shaneyfelt who was a former student of hers.

The book was revised in 1963 with a new title, Talk to the Deaf. The new edition of the book included visual illustrations. Riekehof sat down with the artist demonstrating the production of each sign while the artist visually captured the movement of the signs on paper. Countless hours were spent illustrating and designing the book. The signed drawings helped people to learn sign language vocabulary. It was a great resource for parents communicating with their Deaf children, as well as, children or students learning to sign. The book included a wide range of vocabulary, diagrams, how to produce the sign, history of the sign and was categorized into sections making it easy to follow along. The book was picked up by Gospel Publishing House and it became one of their top best sellers. It has sold over 2 million copies.

In 1978, an updated version, Talk to the Deaf 2 was written. The name was later changed to The Joy of Signing: The new illustrated guide for mastering sign language and the manual alphabet, and it was dedicated to God. It became used around the world. To her surprise, Riekehof even saw her book being used on television to teach chimpanzees how to sign.

The books are currently offered in paperback or hardcover. There has also been a video version made from the books which includes nine hours of footage. Riekehof also created two puzzle books with Linda Lascelle Hillebrand to provide supplemental instruction.
