= Hugh Cochrane (footballer) =

Scottish footballer (1943–2020)

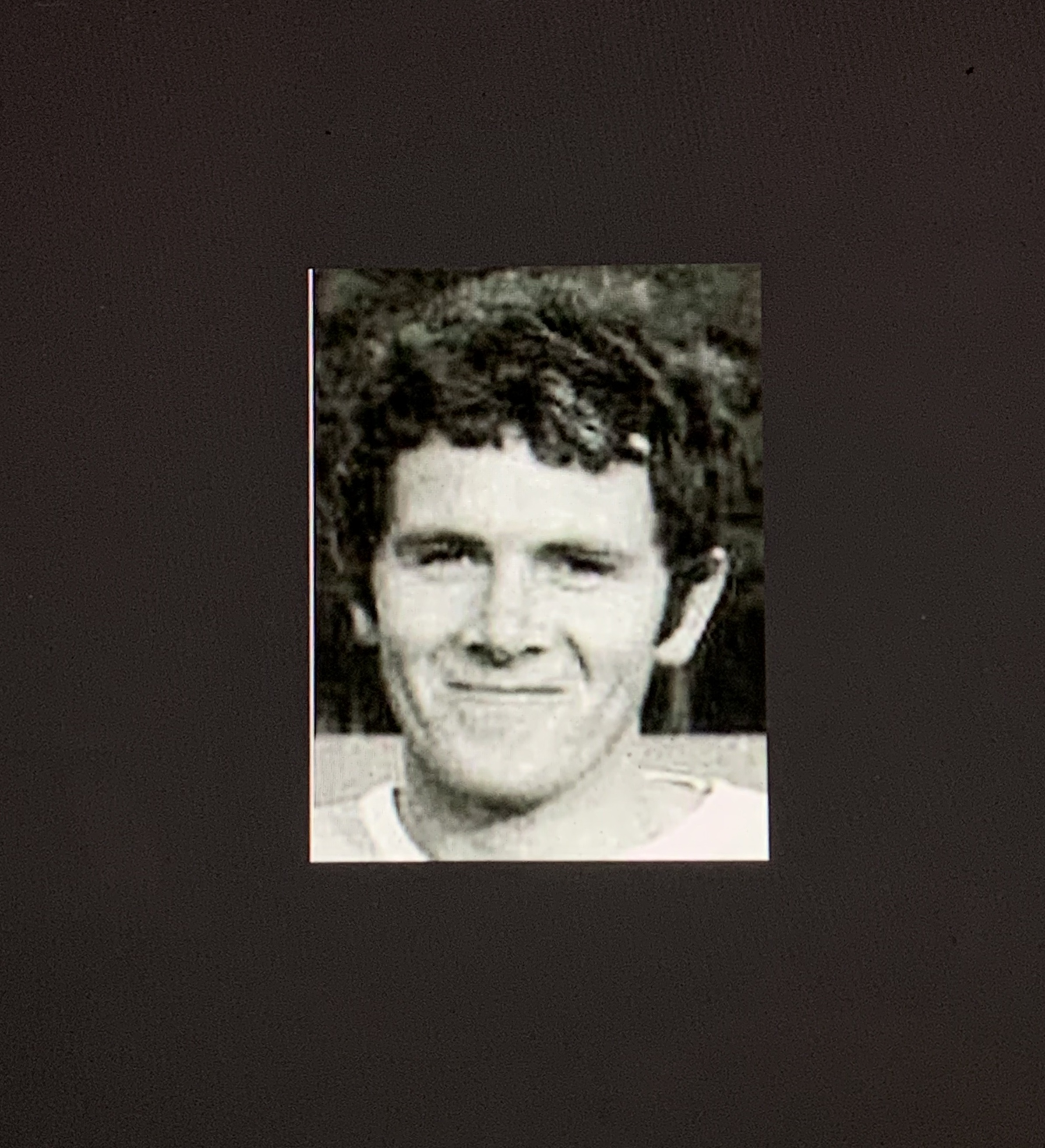

Personal information
- Date of birth: 9 February 1943
- Place of birth: Glasgow, Scotland
- Date of death: 17 August 2020 (aged 77)
- Position: Inside forward

Senior career*
Years	Team	Apps	(Gls)
- Dennistoun Waverley
1961–1963	Dundee United	0	(0)
1963–1965	Barnsley	5	(0)
1965–1966	Wimbledon		
1966–1969	Ashford Town (Kent)		
1969–1971	Margate		
1971	Romford		
1971–1972	Ramsgate		
- Wombwell Sporting Association
- * Club domestic league appearances and goals

Hugh Cochrane (9 February 1943 – 17 August 2020) was a Scottish professional footballer who played as an inside forward. Born in Glasgow, he played junior football for Dennistoun Waverley before signing for Dundee United in 1961. He was released in 1963 without having appeared in the first team. He signed for Barnsley in August 1963, making five Football League appearances. After leaving Barnsley, Cochrane played non-League football for Wimbledon, Ashford Town, Margate, Romford, Ramsgate and as player and manager at Wombwell Sporting Association.
