= Antônio Leite Andrade =

Brazilian politician (died 2020)

Antônio Leite Andrade (died 11 August 2020) was a Brazilian doctor and politician who served on the Senate of Brazil.
