= Lawrence Laurent =

American critic (1925–2020)

- Born: March 9, 1925; Monroe, Louisiana, U.S.
- Died: August 1, 2020 (aged 95); Alexandria, Virginia, U.S.
- Education: University of Virginia
- Occupation: Critic
- Spouse: Margaret Goodwillie
- Relatives: 2 sons, 2 daughters

Lawrence Laurent (March 9, 1925 – August 1, 2020) was an American radio and television critic for The Washington Post from 1951 to 1982. He also taught at American University and George Washington University.
