= Jean-Pierre Dickès =

French doctor (1942–2020)

- Born: 1942; Boulogne-sur-Mer, France
- Died: 28 August 2020 (aged 77–78); Boulogne-sur-Mer, France
- Occupations: Historian; Doctor

Jean-Pierre Dickès (1942 – 28 August 2020) was a French doctor, historian, editor, essayist, and Catholic missionary. He was co-founder of the Centre médico-chirurgical et obstétrique in Côte d'Opale and founder of the humanitarian association Rosa Mystica. He published multiple essays on bioethics and transhumanism, to which he was fervently opposed.

== Biography ==
Dickès was born during the German Occupation of France in Boulogne-sur-Mer in 1942. He was the son of French Resistance fighters Nicolas Dickès and Françoise Dickès-Mahieu. In 1958, Jean-Pierre joined his brother in the Algerian War and saw the return of Charles de Gaulle. He passed his baccalaureate at the age of 16, and entered the Faculty of Medicine of Lille. There, he met the members of Action Française, which he would join in the 1960s. In 1972, he joined the Society of Saint Pius X and participated in the foundation of the parish Saint-Louis de Boulogne-sur-Mer.

Dickès was President of the Société académique du Boulonnais, a learned society and publishing house specializing in the history of Boulonnais. Under his presidency, which lasted from 1985 to 2018, nearly 60 books were published. Many of his works on the historical and linguistic culture of the region were published by the Society, including his French-Picard dictionary, titled Le Patois pour tous, as well as Boulogne-sur-mer au temps du Roi Soleil, in collaboration with Philippe Moulis. He also served as a columnist on Canal Académie and had his own talk show on Radio Courtoisie. He gave lectures on transhumanism, which he considered to be a mortal danger.

Dickès left seminary in 1965, and published his thesis at the Faculté de Médecine de Paris. In 1981, he helped to start the Clinique d'Opal, where he worked as a midwife and a general practitioner. He also worked at the Court of Appeal of Douai, where he was fundamental in a decision on the Outreau trial. In 1998, he took over direction of the Association catholique des Infirmières et Médecins. In 2000, he took over Cahiers Saint-Raphaël, a quarterly Catholic magazine on bioethics and medical news.

Rosa Mystica was a missionary association run by the Catholic Church, created by Dickès in 2007. The charity did much work in the Philippines and provided care to the sick and the elderly. In 2018, he retired from the charity, giving the reins to Dr. Philippe Geoffrey. However, he would continue communication within the organization.

Jean-Pierre Dickès was the father of philosopher Godeleine Lafargue, historian Christophe Dickès, and poet Damien Dickès. He died in Boulogne-sur-Mer on 28 August 2020.

== Books ==
- On sommes péquaille : les Boulonnais parlent de leur santé (1976)
- C'est cor'à rire (1980)
- Le Patois pour tous : les parlers du Boulonnais, Montreuillois et Calaisis (1984)
- Les Noms de famille en Boulonnais, Calaisis et Pays de Montreuil (1986)
- Images de guerre à Boulogne sur mer (1987)
- La Blessure (1988)
- Boulogne 1989 : dessous d'une élection (1989)
- Le patois boulonnais (1992)
- Métiers et noms de famille (2000)
- Les patois de la Côte d'Opale (2002)
- À Tire d'Aile : histoire de l'aviation dans les Boulonnais (2003)
- Sainte Ide de Boulogne (2005)
- Curiosités en Boulonnais (2006)
- L'Homme Artificiel (2007)
- La Côte-d'Opale par les pastellistes (2010)
- Philippines : entre sourires et larmes (2011)
- Boulogne-sur-mer au temps du roi Soleil (2012–2013)
- L'Ultime Transgression (2013)
- De terre, de lumière et d'étoiles (2014)
- La fin de l'espèce humaine (2015)
- Un Jeune Boulonnais dans la Tourmente (1939-1945) (2016–2017)
