= Jean-Michel Goutier =

French poet (1935–2020)

- Born: 1935; Montréal-la-Cluse, France
- Died: 27 August 2020 (aged 84–85); Paris, France
- Occupation: Poet

Jean-Michel Goutier (1935 – 27 August 2020) was a French poet, performer, and essayist.

== Biography ==
Traumatized by his service in the Algerian War, Goutier took up poetry following an entrance into a surrealist group led by André Breton and Radovan Ivšić. Alongside his partner, artist Giovanna, he wrote the plays Lignes de force surréaliste, La Carte absolue, and La Crête de l'incendie.

Goutier wrote for the magazine Les Cahiers noirs du Soleil from 1969 to 1975, where he founded the publishing collective Le Récipiendaire, which was bought by Éditions Plasma. He helped contribute to the rediscovery of the poet Stanislas Rodanski by prefaces in some of his texts.

Goutier was a member of the Association des amis de Benjamin Péret and edited the collective work Benjamin Péret. He was a member of the scientific committee for the André Breton exhibition at the Centre Pompidou.

Jean-Michel Goutier died in Paris on 27 August 2020.

== Works ==
- Discours (1979)
- Benjamin Péret (1982)
- Je vois, j’imagine (1991)
- Le Soleil Noir : recherches, découvertes, trajectoires (1994)
- Pacifique que ça (1995)
- André Breton (1998)
- Écrits - sous le signe du Soleil Noir (1999)
- L'Envers de la panoplie (2000)
- Iván Tovar (2001)
- André Breton, 42 rue Fontaine (2003)
- André Breton : Mettre au ban les partis politiques (2007)
- "Grands" surréalistes (2008)
- Lettres à Aube. 1938-1966 (2009)
- Jacques Hérold et le surréalisme (2010)
