= Carlos Burity =

Angolan musician (1952–2020)

- Born: 14 November 1952; Luanda, Portuguese Angola
- Died: 12 August 2020 (aged 67); Luanda, Angola
- Occupation: Singer

Carlos Burity (14 November 1952 – 12 August 2020) was an Angolan singer. He specialized in Semba music, a traditional Angolan style.

Burity died from respiratory problems on 12 August 2020.

== Albums ==
- AngolaRitmo (1990)
- Carolina (1992)
- Malalanza (2010)
