= Elton Hobson =

Canadian football player (1924–2020)

Profile
- Positions: End, Halfback, Quarterback

Personal information
- Born: November 10, 1924
- Died: August 15, 2020 (aged 95)
- Listed height: 5 ft 8 in (1.73 m)
- Listed weight: 175 lb (79 kg)

Career history
- 1945–1949: Winnipeg Blue Bombers

Elton Hart Hobson (November 10, 1924 - August 15, 2020) was a Canadian football player who played for the Winnipeg Blue Bombers.
