= Satnam Khattra =

Indian fitness trainer and bodybuilder (1989–2020)

Satnam Singh Khattra (23 February 1989 – 29 August 2020) was an Indian fitness trainer and a bodybuilder from Bhalmajra, Fatehgarh Sahib district, Punjab.

A recovered drug addict, Khattra had a large social media following. He died on 29 August 2020 of a heart attack after a short period of illness.
