= Donald Blackmer =

Donald L. M. Blackmer (1929-14 August 2020) was an American professor of political science at the Massachusetts Institute of Technology. He was executive director of the Center for International Studies, a Cold War think-tank established by the Central Intelligence Agency in 1951 to support the government of the United States in its anti-communist struggle with the Soviet Union.

== Publications ==
- 1961: The Emerging Nations: Their Growth and United States Policy, (editor with Max Millikan, also contributor) Boston and Toronto: Little, Brown & Co.
- 1967: Unity in Diversity: Italian Communism and the Communist World, Cambridge, Mass.: M.I.T. Press
- 1974: Communism in Italy and France, (editor with Sidney Tarrow, also contributor) Princeton: Princeton University Press
- 1975 The International Role of the Communist Parties of Italy and France, with Annie Kriegel Cambridge, Mass.: Center for International Affairs, Harvard University
