= Umesh Dastane =

Indian cricketer (1956–2020)

Personal information
- Full name: Umesh Manohar Dastane
- Born: 20 October 1956
- Died: 2 August 2020 (aged 63)
- Source: Cricinfo, 20 August 2020

Umesh Dastane (20 October 1956 – 2 August 2020) was an Indian cricketer. He played in sixteen first-class matches between 1978 and 1985. He died from COVID-19, aged 63.
