= William Rylaarsdam =

American judge (1937–2020)

William F. Rylaarsdam (Willem Frederik Rijlaarsdam; February 13, 1937 – August 3, 2020) was an American judge of the California Courts of Appeal, Fourth District, Division Three. He was appointed by Governor Pete Wilson and, after his confirmation, took the oath of office on April 10, 1995. He was retained by voters in the November 5, 2002 election.

== Biography ==
Rylaarsdam was a native of the Netherlands whose family immigrated to the United States when he was 16 years old. He graduated from the University of California, Berkeley in 1957, then went on to receive his law degree from Loyola Law School in 1964 (after attending night courses at Loyola as a married father with two children at the time). In 1998, he received his Master of Laws degree from the University of Virginia School of Law. On August 3, 2020, the Honorable William Frederick Rylaarsdam died at his home in Rancho Santa Margarita. He is survived by his wife, Barbara (married) and his three children, Mary Jane, Jennifer, and Daniel, and seven grandchildren, Jack Pike III, Julian Vischer, William Pike, Thomas Pike, Margaret Vischer, Mary Vischer, and Willem Rylaarsdam. His wife of 59 years, Janice Rylaarsdam (deceased, 2017) mothered his four children, Mary Jane, Jennifer, Alice Jean (deceased 2020), and Daniel.

Rylaarsdam died on August 3, 2020, at the age of 87.

== Legal career ==
Rylaarsdam began his career in 1964 as an attorney practicing civil litigation. He was among counsel of record to the defendants in a landmark insurance bad faith case decided by the Supreme Court of California in 1973, in which the Court ruled that the implied covenant of good faith and fair dealing applies to all insurance, not just liability insurance.

He worked for various private firms in Los Angeles, Pasadena, and Newport Beach until 1985, when Governor George Deukmejian appointed him to the Los Angeles Superior Court. The next year, he was transferred to the Orange County Superior Court. He worked there until his appointment to the Fourth District, Division Three Court of Appeal in 1995. He retired from the Court of Appeal on June 29, 2016 at the age of 79, after 21 years of service.
