= Yves Hervochon =

French painter (1935–2020)

- Born: 13 June 1935; Rennes, France
- Died: 27 August 2020 (aged 85); Rennes, France
- Occupation: Painter

Yves Hervochon (13 June 1935 – 27 August 2020) was a French painter. He won several regional prizes in Brittany, and two of his paintings were purchased by the City of Rennes.

== Biography ==
Hervochon began painting at age 15 while taking drawing lessons at the École régionale des beaux-arts de Rennes and attending workshops of Mariano Otero and Pierre Gilles. From 1975 to 1980, he began to assert himself as a Breton painter, taking the pseudonym Yv K'hervochon.

Hervochon painted nature primarily, emphasizing the weather and time of year. His colors were often rich and cheerful. He painted landscapes, marine life, villages, etc.

Yves Hervochon died on 27 August 2020 in Rennes at the age of 85.

== Prizes ==
- Prize of the City of Fougères
- Prize of the City of Saintes
- 5th International Prize of Fribourg
- 2nd Prize of Côte de Penthièvre
- 2nd Prize of Val d'Or
- 1st Prize of Belle-Isle-en-Terre
- 1st Prize of Jugon-les-Lacs
- 1st Prize of Cesson-Sévigné
