= Homayoun Reza Atardi =

Iranian musician, composer, and producer (1970–2020)

Homayoun Reza Atardi (25 July 1970 – 3 August 2020) was an Iranian musician, composer, and film and television producer.

== Biography ==
He was born in Mashhad in 1970. In the field of cinema, he received his bachelor's degree in editing and began his musical activities in 1987.

Atardi also worked in the field of film and television production and received a special jury award at the 28th Fajr International Film Festival for his production of the film "Being Time" (Life).

He died in Tehran at age 50 from COVID-19, during the COVID-19 pandemic in Iran.

== Work ==
Among the works of Homayoun Reza Atardi, the following can be mentioned:

=== Soundtracks ===
==== Movies ====
- "Philadelphia", Director: Ismail Rahimzadeh, Seyed Mojtaba Asadipour (2011)
- "Girls", Director: Qasem Jafari (2009)
- "Behind the Curtain of Fog", Director: Parviz Sheikh Tadi (2004)
- "Chori", Director: Javad Ardakani (2000)
- "The Last Battle", Director: Hamid Bahmani (1997)
- "That Man Came", directed by Hamid Bahmani (1993)
- "Ambassador Driver", directed by Shafi Agham Mohammadian and Habibaullah Bahmani (1993)
- "Reverse Effort", directed by Ali Asgari (1993)
- "One Night a Stranger", directed by Hossein Ghasemi Jami (1992)

==== TV series ====
- "Moonlight Night", Director: Shahram Babapour (2009)
- "Singing in the Rain", Director: Sadr al-Din Shajreh (2008)
- "Cannibal", Director: Javad Mazdabadi (2006)
- "Make an appointment with me", Director: Abbas Moradian (2006)
- "A Time for Ashes", Director: Hamid Bahmani (2002)

==== TV movies ====
- "Prophetic Shops", Director: Mehdi Ali Mirzaei (2009)
- "23 Grams" Director: Javad Mazdabadi (2007)

==== Short films ====
- "Burnt Palm", directed by Reza Sobhani (1993)
- "Bells", directed by Davood Rasoulian (1993)
- "Sent", directed by Seyed Rahim Hosseini (1993)
- "City of the Sun", directed by Saeed Nejad Soleimani (1992)
- "Door to the House of the Sun", directed by Abdolsattar Kakai (1993)
- "Butterfly Laughed", directed by Amir Feizi (1993)
- "Another Life", directed by Hamid Bahmani (1993)
- "From Dinner to Roof", directed by Masoud Abparvar (1992)
- "Everything is changing", Director: Seyed Rahim Hosseini (1992)
- "A Void of Something", directed by Ibrahim Azizi (1992)
- "Garden of Paradise", directed by Saeed Nejad Soleimani (1992)
- "Secret of the City of Happiness", directed by Abbas Sajjadi (1992)

==== Documentaries ====
- "The Story of an Ascent" with Mohammad Reza Cheraghali (2015)
- "Journey to the Roof of Iran", directed by Hassan Javanbakht (1992)
- "Water Spectators", directed by Hassan Javanbakht (1992)
- "In the Cage", directed by Mohammad Yarmohammadlou (1992)
- "Night City", Director: Reza Taghdasi (1992)

==== Theater ====
- Tele-Theater "Gear", Director: Qutbuddin Sadeghi (2005)

=== Producer ===
- movie "Giti, Alireza's wife" with Ezatullah Jamei Nodooshan (2009)
- movie "Being Time" (formerly "Life") directed by Jalil Saman (2010)
- TV series "Be with me" with Saeed Adalatkhah (2006)
- TV series "Nari Gol" with Saeed Adalatkhah (2006)
- Bollywood Movie (2009) (Production Licensing Council Stage)

=== Director ===
- Animation "One Step One Step" (2008)
- TV program "Reduce Distances" (2006)

=== Script writing ===
- Cinematic "Anna"
