= Lillette Jenkins-Wisner =

American vocalist and jazz pianist

- Born: February 6, 1924; Harlem, New York
- Died: August 25, 2020 (aged 96)
- Occupations: Vocalist and jazz pianist
- Spouse: Bud Harris

Lillette Jenkins-Wisner (1924–2020) was an American vocalist and jazz pianist. Duke Ellington dubbed her the “Queen of the Keys”.

== Early life and education ==
Jenkins-Wisner was born February 6, 1924, in Harlem, New York. She began playing classical piano at age three and went on to learn gospel, ragtime, jazz and popular music. Jenkins-Wisner began performing publicly at age six. She attended the Manhattan School of Music.

== Career ==
Jenkins-Wisner regularly performed with musicians including Frank Sinatra, Lena Horne, Ray Charles, Ella Fitzgerald, Duke Ellington, and Cab Calloway. She also traveled with the Special Services Unit of the United States Army during World War II.

Together with her husband, Bud Harris, Jenkins-Wisner opened the first black-owned club in Reno, Nevada, in 1945. In 2017, their family honored their relationship through the stage production Lillette’s Rhythm Club.

While working in theatre, Jenkins-Wisner served as the music director for the Off-Broadway musical One Mo’ Time, The Sarah Vaughn Jazz Festival, Sparrow in Flight, Eubie!, and The Life Story of Thomas A. Dorsey, which she also performed in. She also performed in the 1984 film The Cotton Club and regularly served as a pianist for the television series All My Children.

For 25 years, Jenkins-Wisner served as the director and organist for the Newark, New Jersey–based Mt. Zion Baptist Church Gospel Choir.

== Personal life ==
Jenkins-Wisner married actor Bud Harris, with whom she had at least three children: Adrienne Lillette Harris, Michele Harris and late son Marc Harris.

Nat King Cole’s song "Lillette" was written about Jenkins-Wisner.

Jenkins-Wisner died from Alzheimer's disease on August 25, 2020. At the time of her death, she was living in Orlando, Florida. In 2004 her family members founded the Lillette's Foundation for the Arts Inc. and they support The Alzheimer’s Association of America.
