= Victor Ferkiss =

American academic (1925–2020)

- Born: August 2, 1925; Queens, New York
- Died: August 25, 2020 (aged 95); Fort Collins, Colorado

Academic background
- Education: UC Berkeley (B.A. '48, A.M. '49); Yale University (M.A. '50); University of Chicago (Ph.D. '54)

Academic work
- Discipline: American history

Victor Christopher Ferkiss (1925–2020) was professor emeritus of Government, Georgetown University. His 1969 book Technological Man was a sciences finalist for the National Book Award.

== Bibliography ==
- Technological Man (1969)
- The Future of Technological Civilization (1974)
- Nature, technology, and Society (1994)
