= Brenda Brown Canary =

American novelist

- Born: September 8, 1945; Edmond, Oklahoma
- Died: August 1, 2020 (aged 74); Guthrie, Oklahoma
- Education: Central State University
- Occupation: Novelist
- Writing career
- Years active: 1975–1982
- Notable work: The Voice of the Clown

Brenda Brown Canary (1945–2020) was an American novelist, best known for her 1982 horror novel The Voice of the Clown.

== Life ==
Néé Brenda Brown, she was the only child of Harold Brown and Kathryn Kerr Kunc, of Edmond, Oklahoma.

She received a speech and drama degree in 1970 and a master's in creative writing in 1973 from Central State University, with a minor in journalism. She went on to work for the state Department of Human Services for eight years as an investigator and taught at Rose State College before quitting her work to pursue full-time writing in 1977. After divorcing in 1981, however, she returned to Central State as an instructor for the creative writing department.

She died in Guthrie, Oklahoma in 2020. She had one stepson, one son and one daughter.

== Works and legacy ==
Despite pursuing a career as a full-time writing at a time, Canary has only two known book-writing credits. The first one, Home to the Mountain, a romantic mystery she wrote as her master's thesis, was published in hardcover by Walkee & Co. Later that year, it appeared as "Novel of the Month" in Cosmopolitan magazine and was optioned twice for a film adaptation.

Nevertheless, Canary is now better remembered for her second book, a macabre horror novel first published as a mass-market paperback by Avon Books in May 1982. Straddling the horror subgenres of "evil children" (in the vein of David Seltzer's The Omen) and evil clowns (Stephen King's It), The Voice of the Clown is the tale of six-year-old Laura, who is deeply attached to a sinister clown doll that seemingly hates Laura's new stepmother and her newborn baby. By December the same year, the novel was being reprinted after selling out its initial run of 99,500 copies, despite which it wasn't a top seller by Avon's standards.

Decades after its publication, however, The Voice of the Clown earned notoriety amongst paperback collectors due to praise from fellow horror author and expert Grady Hendrix in his book Paperbacks from Hell, where he named it "one of the few books to actually make my jaw drop." Subsequent discovery and praise from online reviewers have led extant copies of The Voice of the Clown to reach high prices in the second-hand book marketplace.

== Bibliography ==
- Home to the Mountain (Walkee & Co., 1975)
- The Voice of the Clown (Avon, 1982)
