= History of the M1 Abrams =

History of the American main battle tank

The M1 Abrams main battle tank has been in service since 1980. Since then, it has gone through dozens of upgrades and been the baseline variant of several vehicles.

== Development ==
=== MBT-70 ===
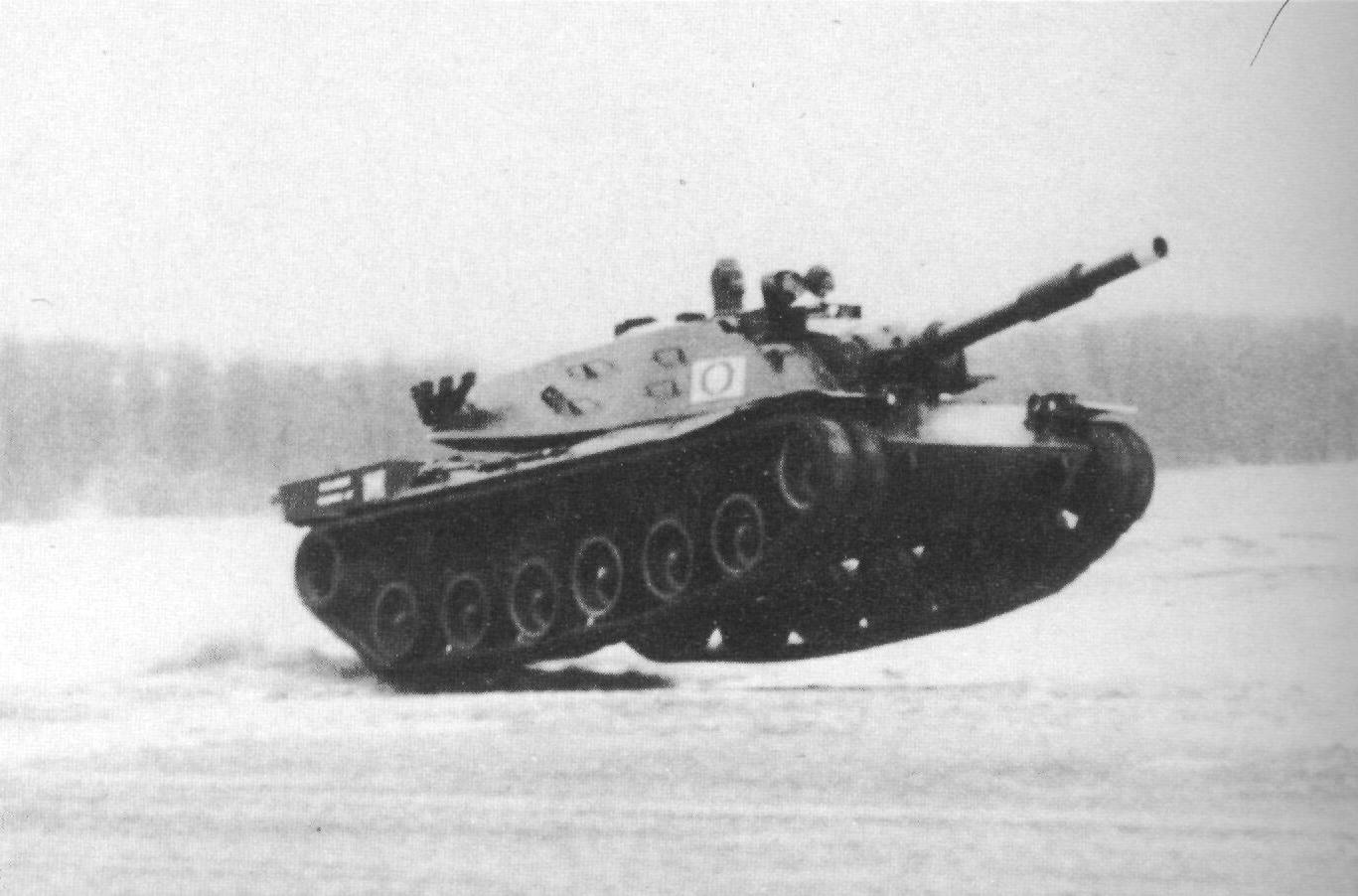
Prototype at Aberdeen Proving Ground undergoing speed tests

In 1963, the U.S. Army and the West German Bundeswehr began collaborating on a main battle tank (MBT) design that both nations would use, improving interoperability between the two NATO partners. The MBT-70, or Kampfpanzer 70 as it was known in Germany, incorporated many new unconventional technologies. Conventional tanks of the time had a crew of four, with the driver located in the hull. In the MBT-70, the loader crewmember would be replaced by a mechanical autoloader and the driver would be located inside the NBC-protected turret with the other two crewmembers. Like the M60A2 MBT and M551 Sheridan light tank then under development, the MBT-70 was armed with a 152 mm gun-launcher that, in addition to firing conventional ammunition, would also fire the Shillelagh missile. A hydropneumatic suspension provided improved cross-country ride quality and also allowed the entire tank to be raised or lowered by the driver.

The United States team was led by General Motors while the German team consisted of a consortium of firms. While it was intended both nations would split costs and receive an equal stake in decisions about the design, the collaboration between the two teams was rocky from the start, with many cultural differences and disagreements about the design hindering progress. Germany favored a tank optimized for the terrain of central Europe while the U.S. attached importance to operating anywhere in the world. The Germans had reservations about the Shillelagh missile and developed a 120 mm high-velocity gun as an alternative. Perhaps the most contentious disagreement, never fully resolved, concerned the measurement system to be used in drafting. Germany became concerned with the excessive weight of the tank. One solution proposed removing radiation hardening from the turret, but this called into question the wisdom of the driver-in-turret configuration, which was intended to protect the crew in the event of a nuclear blast. In light of growing costs, delays and overall uncertainty as to the soundness of the tank design, the United States and Germany ended their MBT-70 partnership in 1970. The U.S. Army began work on an austere version of the MBT-70, named XM803. Systems were simplified or eliminated altogether and the unreliable autoloader was improved. These changes were ultimately insufficient to allay concerns about the tank's cost. Congress canceled the XM803 in December 1971 but permitted the Army to reallocate remaining funds to develop a new main battle tank. Congress appropriated $20 million for the development of a new tank program.

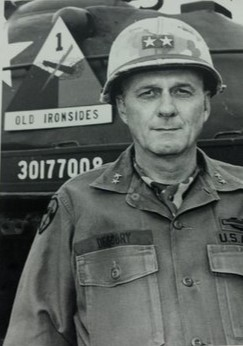
Major General William R. Desobry in 1975

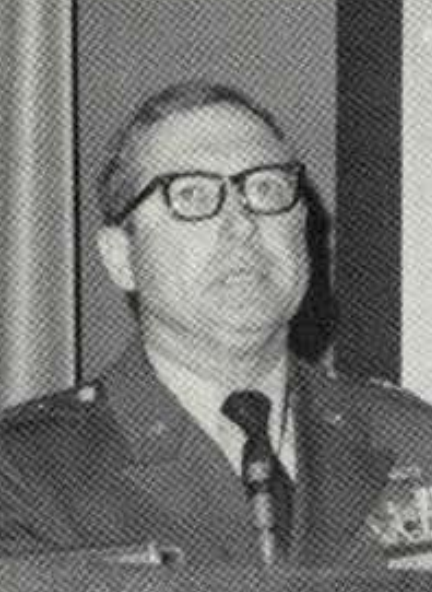
Robert J. Baer speaking at the 1975 Annual Armor Conference

The Army restarted its M60 successor program with Major General William R. Desobry leading the team formulating requirements in March 1972. Army officials told congressmen in April that there was little that could be salvaged from the past efforts, and that a new tank would take at least eight years to develop. A Pentagon task force submitted requirements for the tank in January 1973. By April the Pentagon approved the project, and in July Brigadier General Robert J. Baer was named as project manager. Baer's right-hand man was newly named Army Armor School commander Major General Donn A. Starry. Desobry told The New York Times, "We ought to be shot if it doesn't work."

=== Starting afresh ===
The Army began the XM815 project in January 1972. The Main Battle Tank Task Force was established under Major General William R. Desobry. (Note: Lieutenant Colonel Richard D. Lawrence and Charles K. Heiden were aides on Desobry's task force.) The task force prepared design studies with the technical support of Tank-automotive and Armaments Command (TACOM).

In early 1972, Lieutenant General William E. DePuy met with other generals to determine the Army's most important priorities. The resultant agreement established the new tank as the Army's top acquisition program, one of five major programs that were to be marketed as "The Big Five."

By July, Desobry's task force had completed its work. The task force named weight as one of the most important characteristics of the new tank. The new tank would weigh between 46 and 52 short tons (42 and 47 t). It was believed that more armor would be insufficient to stop new generations of projectiles. Instead, the new tank would use speed, low silhouette, and agility to avoid being hit in the first place. The task force ruled out technologies it believed amounted to gold plating that would increase costs. These included an autoloader, hydropneumatic suspension and a coffee maker for the crew. The 105 mm gun of the M60 tank was deemed an obvious choice.

The task force's push to reduce weight might have gained more acceptance if not for a chance encounter. In the spring of 1972, Desobry visited British Army's Fighting Vehicles Research and Development Establishment at Chobham Common to view a new tank gun. Noticing his disinterest in the gun, his British hosts took the opportunity to brief Desobry on their own highly sensitive "Burlington" armor. Desobry had heard about the new armor in passing from his peers, who told him to disregard it. (Note: The British discovered Chobham armor in 1964. British accounts state that the British were eager to share their technology with the Americans. The Ballistic Research Laboratory (BRL) at Aberdeen Proving Ground performed tests on the material but ultimately deemed the armor ineffective. According to King of the Killing Zone author, Orr Kelly, American decision-makers suffered from not invented here syndrome and unfairly dismissed the promising technology. In 1969 the British convinced the Americans to redo their improperly done tests and so the full potential of the armor was realized. Another factor contributing to the siloing of information at the Pentagon: The British desired secrecy because they hoped to market the armor commercially. (Much to the chagrin of the British, the American scientists later "Americanized" Chobham, calling this development "Starflower". This caused the British to believe their agreement to protect Chobham's commercial interests was being somewhat negated.)

The armor fared moderately better against kinetic energy rounds, but where it excelled was its performance against shaped charges such as HEAT rounds. Chobham armor uses baffles and spaced layers to counteract shaped charges. Shaped charges create a focused metal jet to penetrate armor. The baffles disrupt the jet, and spaced layers cause premature detonation or deformation, reducing its effectiveness. Pound-for-pound it offers better protection than rolled homogeneous armor.

Desobry was sufficiently impressed with the new armor, also known as Chobham. Upon his return to the U.S. Desobry learned that scientists at the Army's Ballistic Research Laboratory (BRL) at Aberdeen Proving Ground, Maryland, had already been at work improving Chobham. Desobry's enthusiasm for the new armor fell flat when he learned that to take full advantage of the new armor, the armor on the new tank would have to be around 2 feet (0.61 m) thick (for comparison, the armor on the M60 is around 4 inches (100 mm) thick) and the tank weighs about 58 short tons (53 t). Against Desobry's wishes, incoming Army Chief of Staff General Creighton Abrams decided the issue and set the weight of the new tank at around 58 short tons (53 t). The original goal of keeping weight under 52 short tons (47 t) was abandoned.

In July 1973, representatives from Chrysler and General Motors traveled to the United Kingdom, and were escorted by BRL personnel from the BRL and Baer to witness the progress of Chobham armor. They observed the manufacturing processes required for the production of Chobham armor and saw a proposed design for a new British vehicle utilizing it. The requirement to add Chobham armor led to major changes to both tanks, none more dramatic than the General Motors model, which received sloped armor on the turret cheeks.

The XM1 program was approved to begin in January 1973. TACOM began examining specific goals. After several rounds of input, the decision was made to provide armor to defeat the "heavy threat" posed by the T-62's 115 mm gun using projected improvements of their armor-piercing fin-stabilized discarding sabot (APFSDS) ammunition through the 1980s, and the new 125 mm gun of the T-64 and T-72 firing HEAT rounds. To this end, a new design basis emerged in February 1973. It had to defeat any hit from a Soviet gun within 800 m (2,600 ft) and 30 degrees to either side. By 1973, the Army had settled on buying 3,312 of the new tanks, with production beginning in 1980. The tank would be armed with the 105 mm M68 gun, a licensed version of the Royal Ordnance L7, and a 20 mm version of the M242 Bushmaster. The Army later deleted the latter from the design, seeing it as superfluous.

In May 1973, Chrysler Defense and General Motors submitted proposals. Both were armed with the 105 mm M68 gun, the licensed L7, and the 20 mm Bushmaster. Chrysler chose a 1,500 hp gas turbine Lycoming AGT1500. GM's model was powered by a 1,500 hp diesel similar to that used on the American MBT-70 and XM803.

At the time, the Pentagon's procurement system was beset with problems being caused by the desire to have the best possible design. This often resulted in programs being canceled due to cost overruns, leaving the forces with outdated systems, as was the case with the MBT-70. There was a strong movement within the Army to get a new design within budget to prevent the MBT-70 experience from repeating itself. For the new design, the Army stated the unit cost was to be no more than $507,000 in 1972 dollars (equivalent to $3,900,000 in 2025).

The Pentagon's approach to control of research and development was modified with the XM1. Previous acquisition strategy called for a significant amount of the design work to be done by the government. Under the new framework, contractors would competitively bid their own designs rather than compete solely for the right to manufacture the end product.

The price of the $3 billion program was assailed by Congressman Les Aspin in July 1973. The Pentagon had projected unit costs were to be less than US$507,000 in 1972 dollars. Aspin argued that were the research and development costs factored in, tanks would actually cost over $900,000 a piece (compared to $1.3 million for the canceled MBT-70). Noting that the M60 Patton cost only $500,000 each, Aspin said, "I'm sure that the Army's new tank is not twice as good as what we have today."

In June 1973, the Army awarded competitive three-year contracts – $68 million for Chrysler Corporation and $87 million to General Motors Corporation – for the production of prototypes. Ford had initially hoped to bid on the program but dropped out because the Department of Defense would not allow its Israeli designers to participate. In February 1976 the two prototypes were tested at Aberdeen Proving Ground. Chrysler chose a regenerative turbine engine made by Avco Lycoming while General Motors chose a Teledyne Continental diesel engine. They were armed with the license-built version of the 105 mm Royal Ordnance L7 gun.

In 1974 the United States signed a somewhat vague memorandum of understanding with West Germany; both countries affirmed the intention to make all reasonable efforts to standardize their tank programs. Neither nation was bound to select one of the tanks. However, the popular belief, reinforced from time to time by official statements of both Governments, was that both the XM1 and the Leopard 2 were bidding to become the Army's next main battle tank. West Germany was not committed to considering the XM1 for their forces.

=== More changes ===
The Ballistic Research Laboratory (BRL) used computerized tools during the development of the M1, which led to the development of BRL-CAD. Here, a Vector General 3D graphics terminal displays a model of the M1.

Through the period while the initial prototypes were being built, a debate broke out between West Germany and U.S. about the use of the 105 mm gun. The Army was planning on introducing several new types of ammunition for the 105 that would greatly improve its performance, notably, the XM-774 using depleted uranium. These rounds would give it the performance needed to defeat any Soviet tank with ease. There was some concern that depleted uranium would not be allowed in Germany, perhaps just in peacetime, so improvements to the tungsten-cored M735 were also considered.

By 1977, the decision had been made to eventually move the new tank to a 120 mm gun. After head-to-head testing between the Royal Ordnance L11A5 and the Rh-120, the latter was chosen and later type-classified as the M256. The turret designs of the two prototypes were modified to allow either gun to be fitted. Although the L11/M256 120mm gun was chosen to be the main weapon of the Abrams in 1979, the improved ammunition for the gun still was not fully developed, thus delaying its fielding until 1984.

The early production versions of the M1 Abrams (M1 & IPM1) were armed with the M68A1 for two reasons. First was due to the large number of M60 tanks with the M68E1 gun still in widespread US service in the 1980s and a large on-hand stockpile of 105 mm munitions. Fitting the M1 with the M68A1 gun was viewed as an economical and practical solution that allowed for commonality in ammunition among the two types of tanks.

=== Prototypes ===
XM1 prototypes

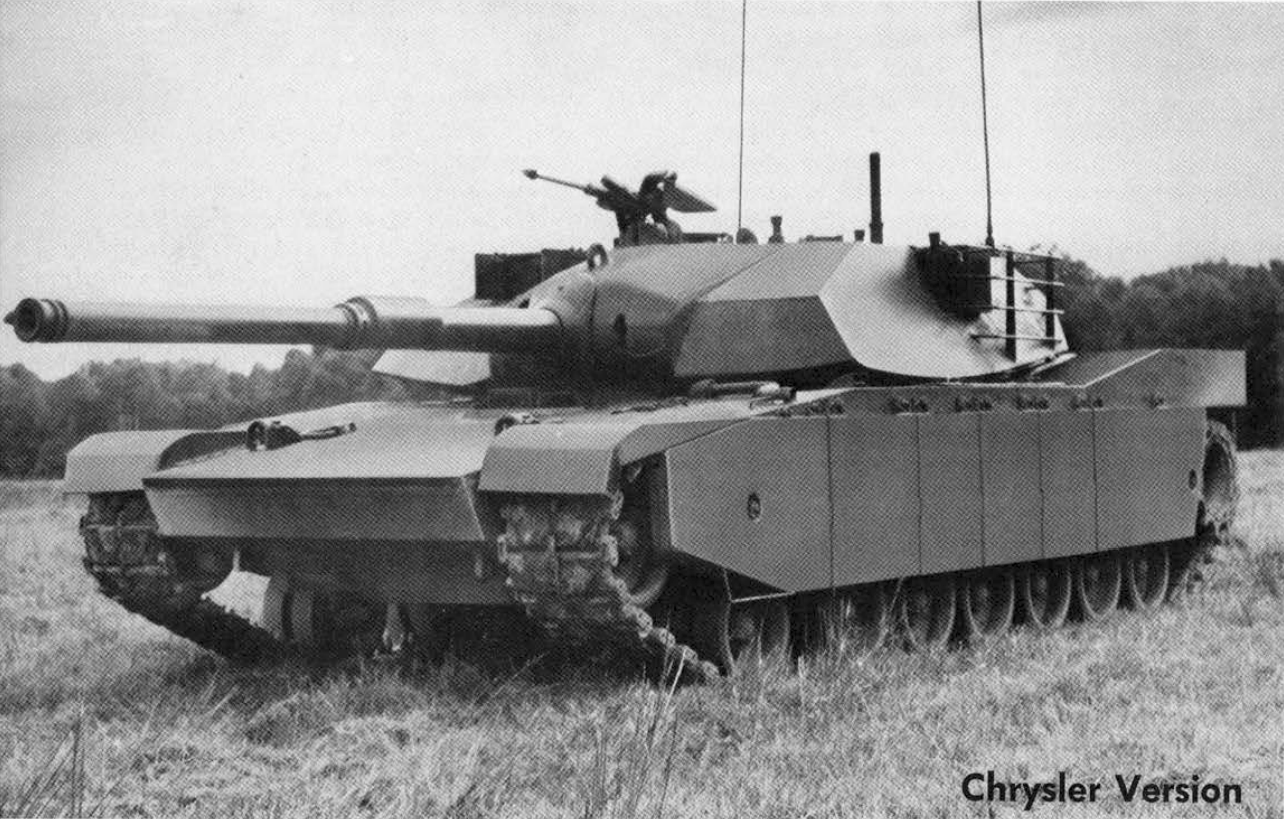
Chrysler

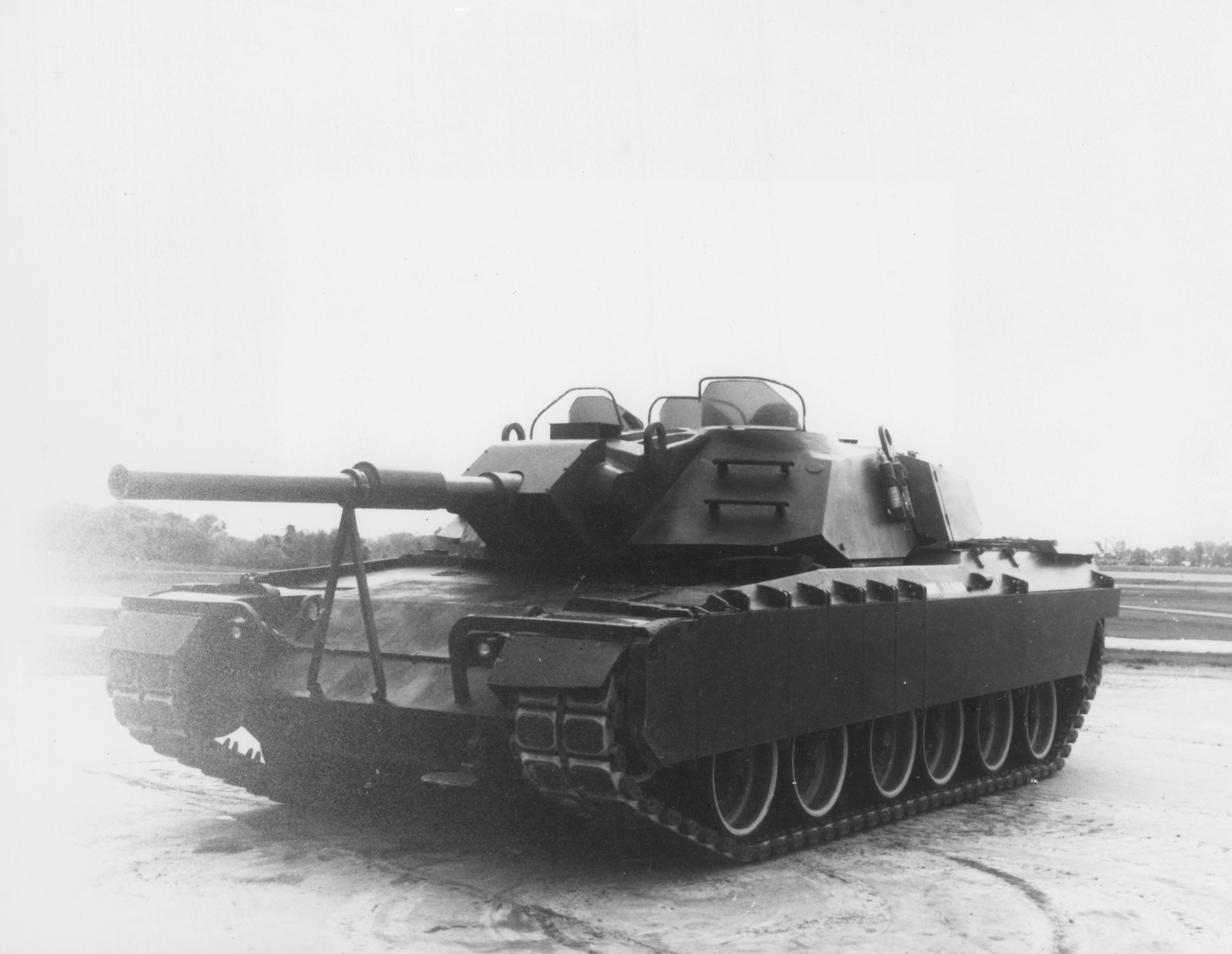
General Motors

Prototypes were delivered in February 1976 by Chrysler and GM armed with the M68E1 105 mm gun in a nonfunctional turret. They entered head-to-head testing at Aberdeen Proving Ground, along with a Leopard 2 AV prototype armed with a 105 mm gun for comparison. The Leopard 2 was found to meet U.S. requirements but was thought to cost more. The testing showed that the GM design was generally superior to Chrysler's, offering better armor protection, and better fire control and turret stabilization systems. These early preproduction prototypes were provisionally armed with the 105 mm main gun while a preferred 120 mm gun and its ammunition were in their design and component development phase. These prototypes used a combination mount that allowed for evaluating both 105 and 120 mm guns.

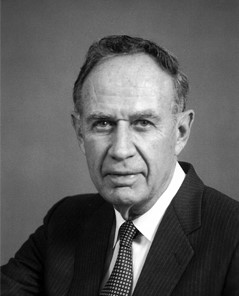
Philip W. Lett, the leader of the Chrysler team

Philip W. Lett led Chrysler's design team. Lett was an experienced tank designer. Chrysler had spent considerable attention to the choice of the engine. Lett considered three different engines for the XM1: a water-cooled German Daimler-Benz diesel developed for the Leopard 2, an air-cooled American Teledyne Continental Motors diesel, and a modified helicopter engine by Avco Lycoming. The German design was ruled out mainly for political reasons. The turbine was smaller and lighter than the diesel. It was quieter, produced no smoke, and accelerated more quickly. It started reliably in cold weather without warming up. With fewer moving parts it was also more reliable and cost less to maintain. Drawbacks included the turbine's worse fuel economy, sensitivity to dust and debris, and the troops' lack of familiarity with the engine. Eventually, Lett chose the turbine.

Anticipating that future iterations of the tank would grow heavier, Chrysler's design used seven road wheels per side, versus GM's six.

GM's team was led by Fred A. Best. The GM team was housed under the GM's Detroit Diesel-Allison Division and hired engineers associated with the MBT-70 program. Best was a more cautious leader than Lett and did not give in to indecision, especially on the issue of the engine. GM's design was nicknamed "Old Smokey" by Chrysler's team—after the plumes of black exhaust emitted by the tank.

During testing, the power packs of both designs proved troublesome. The Chrysler gas turbine engine had extensive heat recovery systems in an attempt to improve its fuel efficiency to something similar to a traditional internal combustion engine. This proved not to be the case: the engine consumed much more fuel than expected, burning 3.8 US gallons per mile (890 L/100 km). The GM design used a new variable-compression diesel design.

Following testing, the Army Source Selection Evaluation Board compared the two tanks. The board's role was not to decide on the winner—the decision was left up to the Secretary of the Army. Although both tanks performed exceedingly well, many who saw the results believed the GM model had a definite advantage. Although the Chrysler engine performed better in some aspects, there were concerns about the engine both from a cost, reliability, and fuel consumption standpoint. The GM program was also slightly cheaper overall at $208 million compared to $221 million for Chrysler. In July 1976, the Army prepared to inform Congress of the decision to move ahead with the GM design. All that was required was the final sign-off by the Secretary of Defense, Donald Rumsfeld.

=== Chrysler is chosen ===
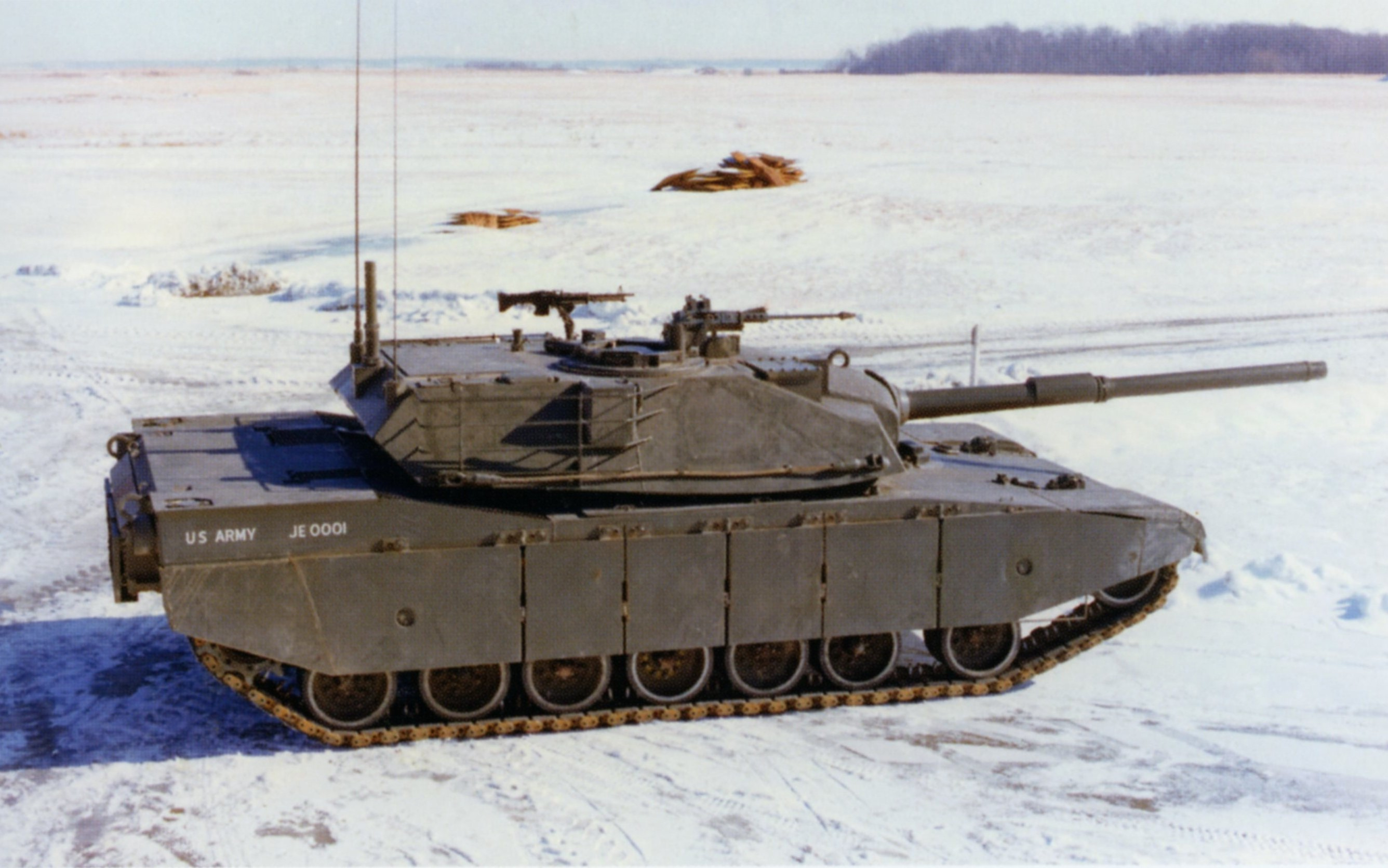
Chrysler XM1 FSED model in 1976

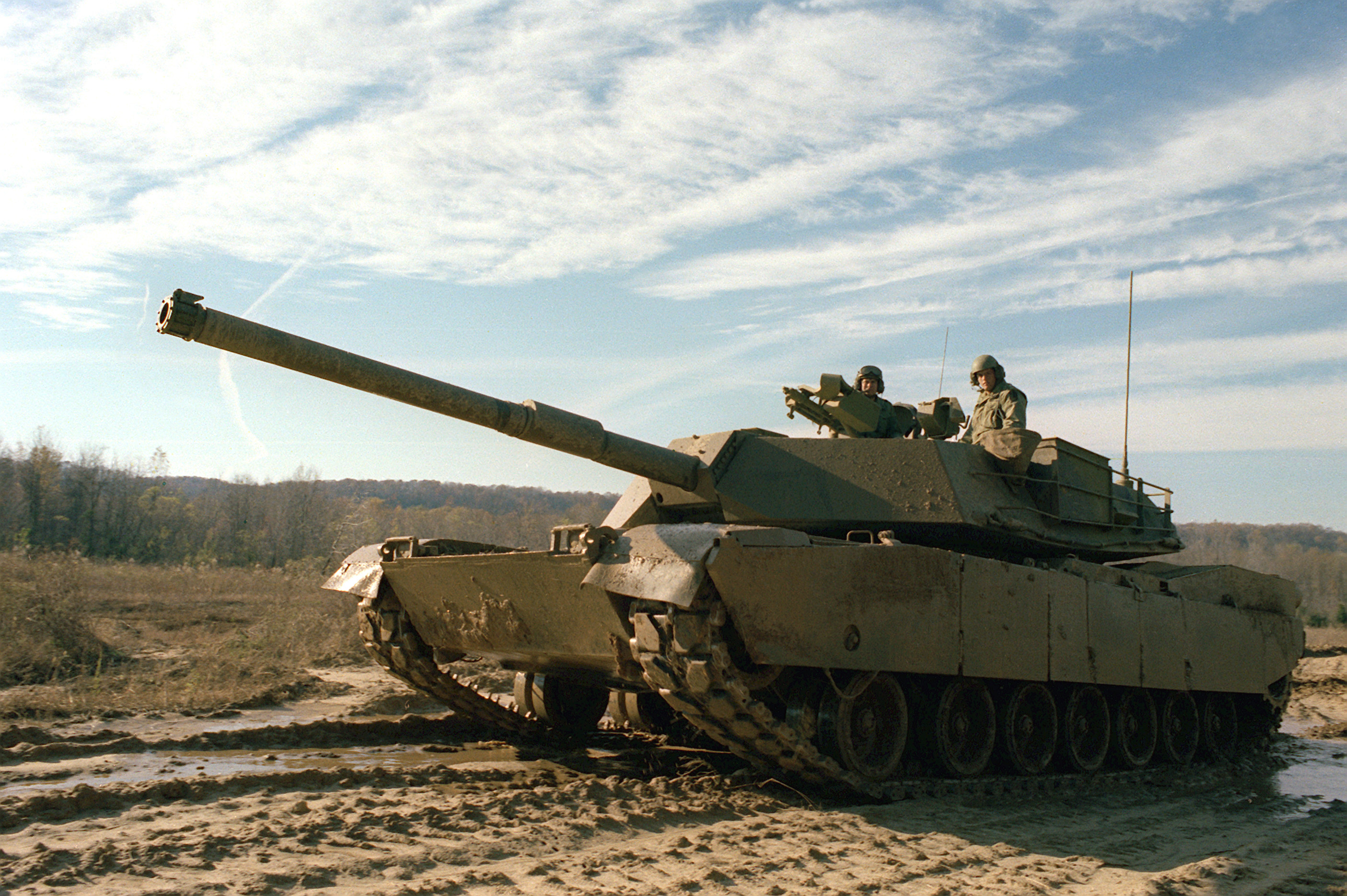
An XM1 Abrams during a demonstration at Fort Knox, Kentucky, in 1979

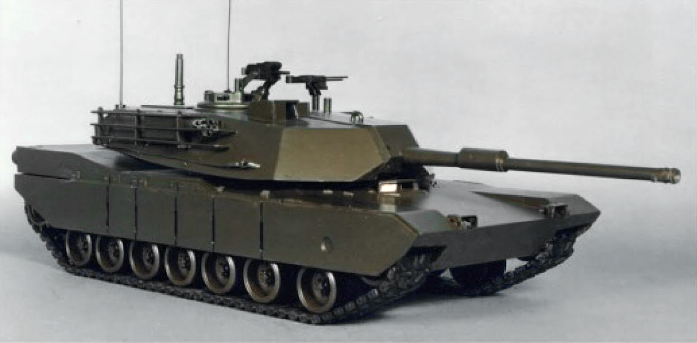
The finalized M1 scale model

On 20 July 1976, United States Secretary of the Army Martin Hoffmann and a group of generals visited Deputy Defense Secretary Bill Clements and Director of Defense Research and Engineering Malcolm Currie to present their decision. They were surprised when Clements and Currie criticized their decision and demanded the turbine be selected. Donald Rumsfeld heard arguments from both in the afternoon. The Army team spent the night writing briefs and presented them to Rumsfeld the next morning, who then announced a four-month delay.

Within days, GM was asked to present a new design with a turbine engine. However, according to Assistant Secretary for Research and Development Ed Miller, "It became increasingly clear that the only solution which would be acceptable to Clements and Currie was the turbine... It was a political decision that was reached, and for all intents and purposes that decision gave the award to Chrysler since they were the only contractor with a gas turbine."

Rumsfeld also felt this time could be used to increase the tank's commonality with the Leopard 2. Baer was sent to Europe with a delegation. The Germans and Americans agreed to share technology. The Germans would use the American turbine engine and the Americans would use the German 120 mm gun. Fuel, ammunition, tracks, transmission, night vision devices, and gunner's telescopes would be made in common. A furor ensued once Congress got wind of the agreement. Some believed the Germans would renege on the deal, especially on the matter of the engine. The Leopard 2 was far along in development—too far along, some believed, to accommodate the turbine.

Congressman Lois Stratton and Elwood Hillis authored a report in September that attacked Rumsfeld for unduly setting back the tank program. The Armed Services Committee was set to vote on a resolution backed by Stratton and Hillis forcing the Pentagon to choose a contractor using the framework of the original competition. Instead a substitute resolution, endorsed by the Pentagon, prevailed. It allowed the Pentagon until November to choose one of the contractors on the basis of Clements' criteria.

Chrysler's team, meanwhile, upon learning they had narrowly averted losing the contract, had set about improving the design. Expensive components were replaced with less expensive ones. Lett's team also negotiated lower costs from their subcontractors. The price of the redesigned tank's turret especially was decreased, but other improvements came from unexpected places such as a $600 hydraulic oil reservoir replaced with a $25 one. Chrysler also submitted a version with a Teledyne AVCR-1360 diesel engine. Chrysler's new bid came to $196 million, down from $221 million in the original proposal.

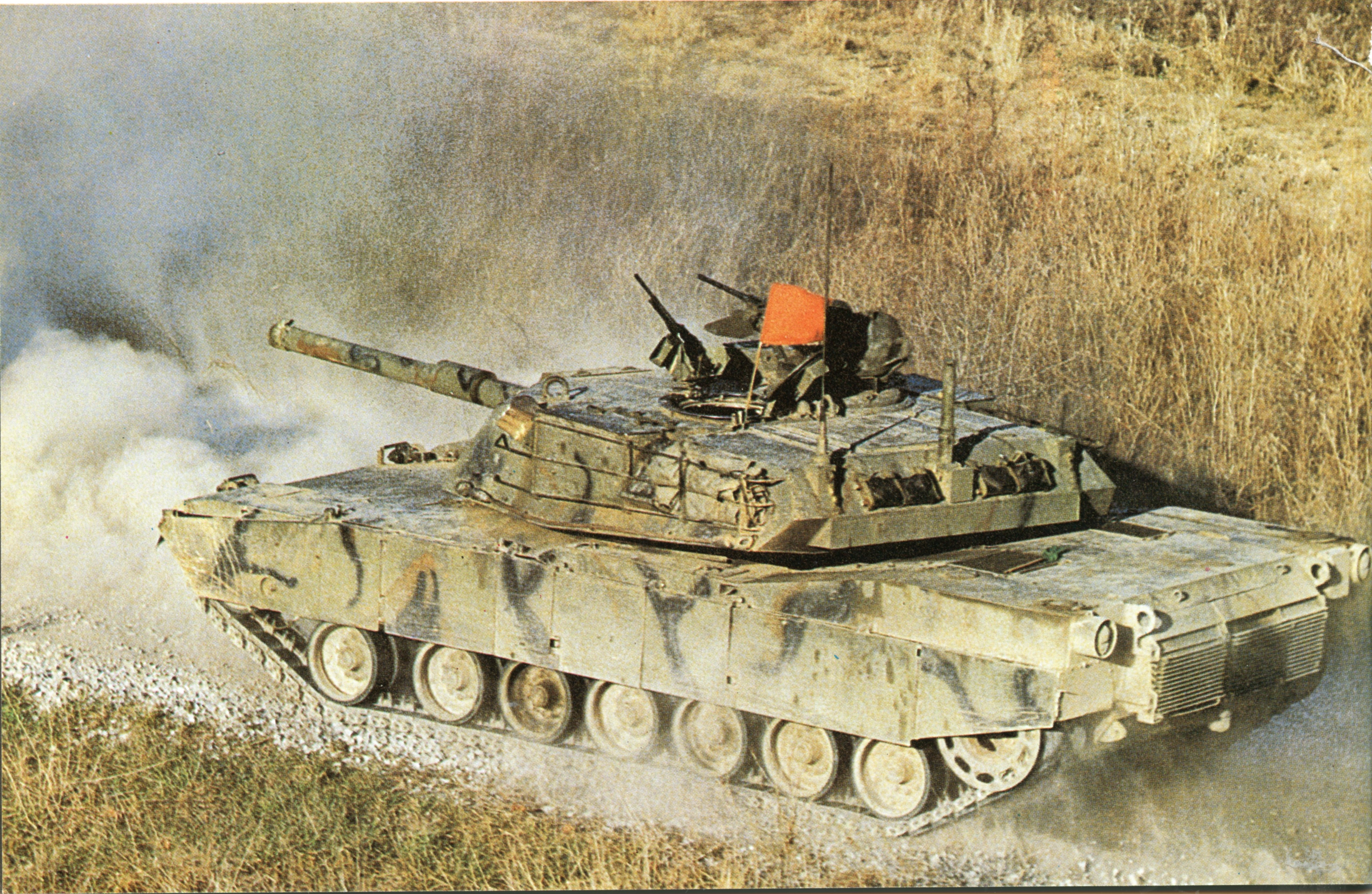
An XM1 pilot during trials in 1979

GM's proposal replaced the diesel engine with an AGT-1500 turbine and integrated a turret capable of mounting either the 105 mm or 120 mm gun. Cost growth pushed the tank bid to $232 million from $208 million.

Although the GM team had successfully integrated the turbine, Baer was more impressed by the cost savings introduced by the Chrysler team's redesign. On 12 November 1976, the Defense Department awarded the $4.9 billion development contract to Chrysler.

The turbine engine does not appear to be the only reason for this decision. Chrysler was the only company that appeared to be seriously interested in tank development; the M60 had been lucrative for the company and relied on that program for much of its profit. In contrast, GM made only about 1% of its income from military sales, compared to 5% for Chrysler, and only submitted their bid after a "special plea" from the Pentagon. Chrysler's proposal may have also been attractive because the company said it could incorporate the Rheinmetall M256 120 mm cannon without increasing costs, weight, or the production timeline.

=== Production issues ===
The 11 preproduction models were manufactured between February and July 1978 at Detroit Arsenal Tank Plant.

Quality problems with the engine quickly became apparent to Lett, who requested a schedule slip of six months to diagnose the problem. Baer was unwilling to allow this and so the tank continued off the assembly line into the hands of soldiers. Quality issues were not limited to the engine, however. The first preproduction units that arrived at Aberdeen Proving Ground in March 1978 had serious problems. They were such that in 1979 Desobry was called out of retirement to work as an Army consultant. At Fort Bliss he found the soldiers training on the tank were mismanaged and had not been properly trained by Chrysler on how to operate the tank. The tank accumulated mud under the hull which led to thrown tracks. This was resolved by Chrysler, who installed a scraper. This did not solve the issue entirely. It was determined months later that the track tension gauge was miscalibrated. This caused the tracks to be fitted too loosely.

Another problem was the ingestion of debris by the engine. It was eventually determined that workers had removed metal around the engine air inlet to make the engine fit on each of the 11 preproduction models. This allowed air carrying dust and other debris to go around the filter. Additionally, the air filters built ad hoc by Chrysler as a cost-saving measure left over a half-inch gap on each seal.

At Fort Bliss, several tanks experienced transmission issues. It was determined that the soldiers at Fort Bliss had discovered that they could throw the vehicle from acceleration into reverse, a tactically advantageous maneuver called the "bow tie". Chrysler installed a device that prevented this.

The problems with the engine sowed doubt that the turbine was appropriate for use in a tank. Teledyne Continental Motors used the moment to mount effort to convince the Army to replace the turbine with a diesel engine. The diesel argument was convincing enough to persuade the Government Accounting Office (GAO) to endorse the engine. The Army however was steadfast in their belief in the turbine. GAO remained critical of the tank program, not least of all for its engine, in reports over the next few years.

American press coverage of the XM1 program was critical of the tank and its perceived design flaws. Some press characterized the XM1 as being ridden with unnecessarily expensive gold plating. One report falsely claimed the XM1 unit cost was three times as much as the M60. Many of the criticisms of the tank were championed by a series of reports by the newly founded Project on Military Procurement (later renamed the Project on Government Oversight). Beginning in 1981, Project on Military Procurement founder Dina Rasor leveled charges that the tank was experiencing excessive cost growth and was too vulnerable. Rasor's criticism failed to generate any serious opposition to the program, which maintained strong support from Congress and the Pentagon. American tank historian Steven J. Zaloga characterized American press criticism of the XM1 as "ill-founded". Zaloga wrote the issues uncovered by the tank trials were "not particularly serious". Responding to some of the alleged criticism in King of the Killing Zone (1989), journalist Orr Kelly wrote that "The truth is close to the opposite." Kelly said the program "ranks as one of the Army's best managed", producing a tank in "a remarkably short time" while avoiding "gold-plating" and utilizing effective competition.

In May 1979 the Secretary of Defense approved the XM1 for low-rate initial production for 110 vehicles. In October 1979 Defense Secretary Harold Brown approved 352 production tanks for the 1980 fiscal year.

The first two delivered XM1 "Abrams" were debuted at a ceremony at Lima Army Tank Plant in Lima, Ohio in February 1980. General Creighton Abrams' widow christened the tank with a bottle of champagne smashed over the tank's gun barrel. The tank's name had been revealed years before by Army Secretary Howard "Bo" Callaway. The Army Secretary had preempted the Army's unannounced plans to name the tank after General George C. Marshall.

Avco Lycoming engine production underpaced tank production for the first three years after the start of the initial production model. Its production plant in Stratford, Connecticut, was in poor condition. For the first few years engines were swapped out between hulls for tests. When one tank was finished being put through its paces, the engine would be pulled out and placed in another vehicle for more tests. At one point, 35 tanks at Lima were idled without engines. The problems were acute that Congress briefly considered establishing a second source for the engine.

On the verge of bankruptcy, in February 1982 Chrysler announced the sale of Chrysler Defense, its profitable defense subsidiary, to General Dynamics. The sale was completed in March 1982 for $336.1 million. Chrysler Defense was renamed General Dynamics Land Systems (GDLS). General Dynamics, accustomed to being paying its factory workers lower wages than Chrysler Defense, balked at the union's proposed wage increases. Plants responsible for building the M60 and M1 Abrams went on strike in 1985, causing GDLS to miss production targets that year by some 300 tanks. A year after the strike GDLS was producing 100 tanks a month and making steady progress in eliminating the backlog, Recognizing issues with quality control, GDLS improved factory lines and poured money into research. Defect rates were extraordinarily low by 1986.

In February 1981 the Army had upped the number of M1 Abrams sought to 7,058, and it classified the tank as standard as the 105 mm gun full tracked combat tank M1.

Detroit Arsenal Tank Plant joined Lima in producing the tank in March 1982, with both plants projected to produce about 30 tanks each per month. 3,273 M1 Abrams were produced 1979–85. An improved model called the IPM1 was produced briefly from October 1984 to May 1996 and contained small upgrades.

It was initially planned to retrofit the M1 and IPM1 with a longer barrel version of the 105 mm M68 gun. In January 1978, a program was initiated to develop an enhanced version of the 105mm gun, the M68A1 as a possible alternate weapon for the M1 Abrams. The new XM24/L55 gun barrel was 18 inches (460 mm) longer in comparison to the XM24/L52 barrel used on the M60 tanks. It has a higher chamber pressure, reinforced breech (Note: In firearms the breech is part of a firearm at the rear of the barrel, as defined by Merriam Webster.) and a higher muzzle velocity. This plan was abandoned in favor of retrofitting the 120 mm gun to older Abrams tanks.

Concurrently, the M1A1 with its 120 mm gun was standardized in August 1984. In December 1988 GDLS was awarded a full-scale development contract for the M1A2 Abrams.

About 6,000 M1A1 Abrams were produced from 1986 to 1992 and featured the M256 120 mm smoothbore cannon developed by Rheinmetall AG of Germany for the Leopard 2, improved armor, and a CBRN protection system.

== Gulf War ==
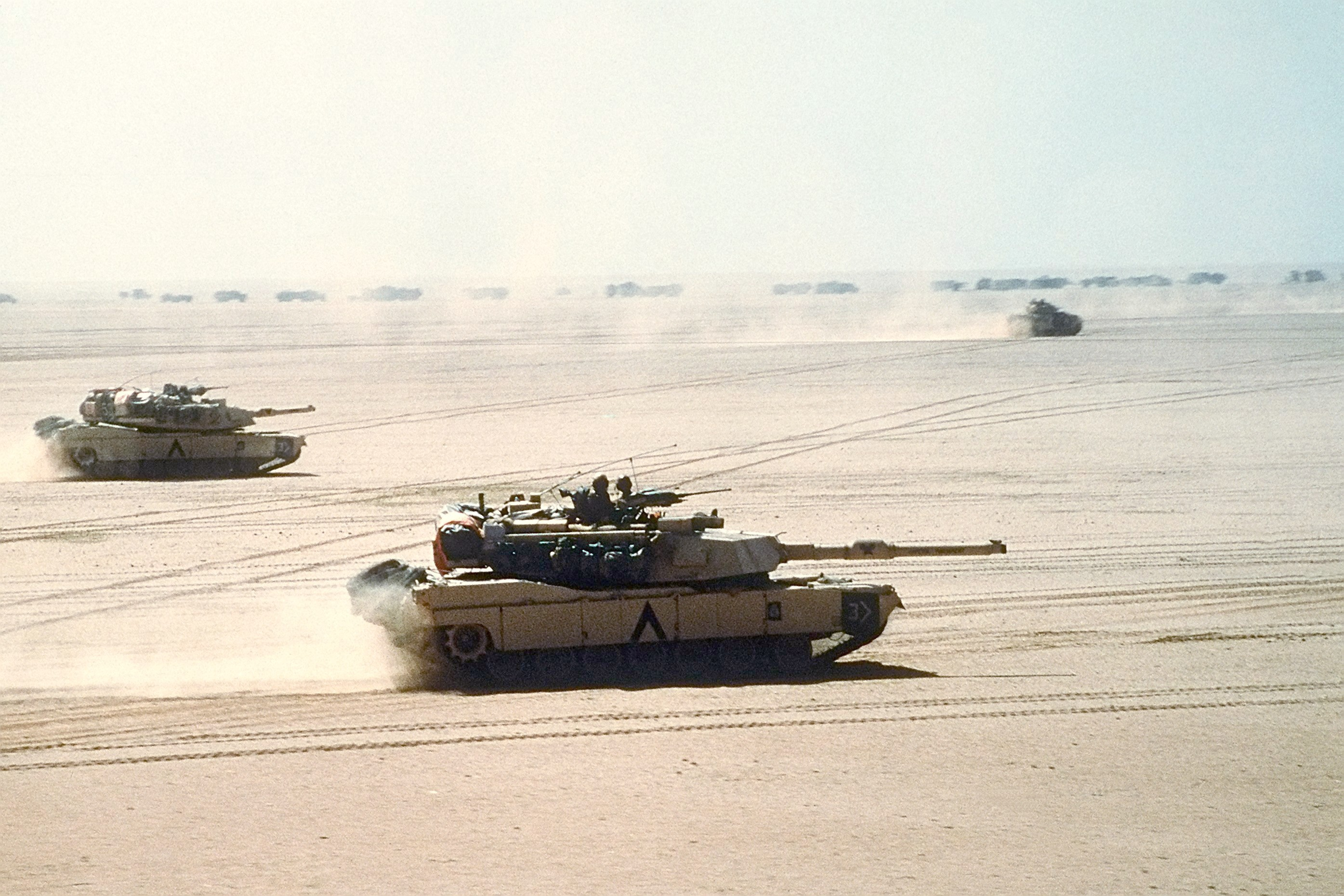
Abrams move out on a mission during the Gulf War. A Bradley IFV and logistics convoy can be seen in the background.

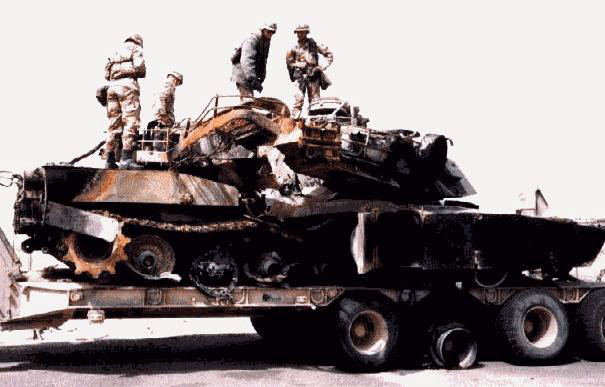
M1A1 bumper B-23, lost during the Gulf War

As the Abrams entered service in the 1980s, they would operate alongside M60A3 within the United States military, and with other NATO tanks in numerous Cold War exercises. These exercises usually took place in Western Europe, especially West Germany, but also in some other countries like South Korea. During such training, Abrams crews honed their skills for use against the men and equipment of the Soviet Union. However, by 1991 the Soviet state had collapsed and the Abrams would have its trial by fire in the Middle East.

The Abrams remained untested in combat until the Gulf War in 1991. The M1A1 was superior to Iraq's Soviet-era T-55 and T-62 tanks, as well as Iraqi assembled Russian T-72s, and locally produced copies (Asad Babil tank). The T-72s, like most Soviet-exported designs, lacked then-modern night vision systems, though they did have some night fighting tanks with older active infrared systems or floodlights—just not the latest starlight scopes and passive infrared scopes as on the Abrams. (Note: "According to the Army's Office of Deputy Chief of Staff for Operations and Plans, 23 Abrams tanks were destroyed or damaged in the Persian Gulf area. Of the nine Abrams destroyed, seven were due to friendly fire, and two were intentionally destroyed to prevent capture after they became disabled. Other Abrams tanks were damaged by enemy fire, land mines, on-board fires, or to prevent capture after they became disabled.") Some others took minor combat damage, with little effect on their operational readiness. Very few M1 tanks were hit by enemy fire, and none were destroyed as a direct result of enemy fire, with no fatalities due to enemy fire.

The M1A1 was capable of making kills at ranges in excess of 2,500 meters (8,200 ft). This range was crucial in combat against tanks of Soviet design in Desert Storm, as the effective range of the main gun in the Soviet/Iraqi tanks was less than 2,000 meters (6,600 ft). (Note: Iraqi tanks could not fire anti-tank missiles like their Russian counterparts) This meant Abrams tanks could hit Iraqi tanks before the enemy got in range—a decisive advantage in this kind of combat. In friendly fire incidents, the front armor and fore side turret armor survived direct APFSDS hits from other M1A1s. This was not the case for the side armor of the hull and the rear armor of the turret, as both areas were penetrated at least in two occasions by friendly DU ammunition during the Battle of Norfolk.

On the night of February 26, 1991, four Abrams were disabled, possibly as a result of friendly fire by Hellfire missiles fired from AH-64 Apache attack helicopters, wounding some crew members. (Note: George Forty cites an M1A1 tank platoon leader from TF 1-37: "Speculation continues concerning what knocked out our four tanks. The three most probable answers are T-72 main gun, dismounted anti-tank missile, or Apache launched Hellfire missile. The fact that Apaches were operating to our rear and witnesses' reports of high round trajectory support the friendly fire theory. However, ballistics reports suggest that 125 mm HEAT rounds produced the damage on some of the tanks. Visual examination of others reveals one obvious sabot hole. Overall, the physical evidence implies that T-72 fire took out our tanks, but the friendly fire possibility cannot be excluded.") The tanks were part of TF 1-37, attacking a large section of Tawakalna Republican Guard Division, their numbers being B-23, C-12, D-24 and C-66. Abrams C-12 was definitively hit and penetrated by a friendly DU shot and there is some evidence that another Iraqi T-72 may have scored a single hit on B-23, besides the alleged Hellfire strike. (Note: A DU shell would have left radiological traces, so the unknown was likely an Iraqi 125mm round.)

Tanks D-24 and C-66 took some casualties, but only B-23 became a permanent loss. The DoD's damage assessments state that B-23 was the only M1 with signs of a Hellfire missile found nearby.

Also during the Gulf War, three Abrams of the U.S. 24th Infantry Division were left behind the enemy lines after a swift attack on Talil airfield, south of Nasiriyah, on February 27. One of them was hit by enemy fire, the two other embedded in mud. The tanks were destroyed by U.S. forces in order to prevent any trophy-claim by the Iraqi Army. (Note: "One of the M1s is hit and disabled. The crew is extracted safely and the tank left behind, not before it is destroyed by the task force commander who fires two rounds into it. The first bounces off, the second penetrates and set it on fire[…] The terrain is still causing problems. On the attack several vehicles get embedded in mud and can't be extracted. The problem is complicated by enemy missile and machine gun fire. Two tanks and two armored personnel carriers are destroyed and discarded.")

A total of 23 M1A1s were damaged or destroyed during the war. Of the nine Abrams tanks destroyed, seven were destroyed by friendly fire and two intentionally destroyed to prevent capture by the Iraqi Army. Some others took minor combat damage, with little effect on their operational readiness.

=== Tank and crew casualties ===
No.	Identification number	Type of weapon	Date and place	Description of damage	Casualties
1.	Bumper B-31 TF 1-5 CAV	Mine	February 19 Ruqi Pocket	Tracks/Engine	None
2.	Unknown number 1st Brigade, 2nd Armored Division	Mine	February 24 Southern Kuwait	Tracks, One M1 tank struck a mine in the breach and lost some road wheels. No one in the tank was injured, and the tank was back in action within a day.	None
3.	Bumper K-42 2nd Armored Cavalry Regiment	Struck by DPICM artillery	February 26 73 Easting	Loader machine-gun and left fuel cell destroyed	1 WIA
4.	Bumper B-66 TF 1-41, 2nd Armored Division(FWD)	Three DU kinetic energy rounds, after being hit by an Iraqi RPG-7	February 26 Norfolk line	Penetration in the hull, below the turret Ammunition blown-up	1 KIA, 3 WIAs
5.	Bumper B-22 TF 1-41, 2nd Armored Division(FWD)	One DU kinetic energy round	February 26 Norfolk line	Front slope hit with no internal damage	1 WIA
6.	Bumper A-14 TF 1-41, 2nd Armored Division(FWD)	One DU kinetic energy round	February 26 Norfolk line	One hit in the left side of the hull. Extensive damage by fire	3 WIAs
7.	Bumper A-31 TF 1-41, 2nd Armored Division(FWD)	Splinters of one DU kinetic energy penetrator	February 26 Norfolk line	Hit in the rear left hull	None
8.	Bumper A-33 TF 1-41, 2nd Armored Division(FWD)	Two DU rounds, after being hit by TOW missile	February 26 Norfolk line	Double penetration of the hull	3 WIAs
9.	Bumper D-24 TF 1-37, 1st Armored Division	Small caliber shaped charge	February 26 Assault on Tawakalna Division	Impact on NBC exhausts, compartment penetrated	2 WIAs
10.	Bumper B-23 TF 1-37, 1st Armored Division	Large caliber shaped charge, then hit by an unknown round, likely a KE (non-DU)	February 26 Assault on Tawakalna Division	Two hits, one on the rear grills, another penetrated both sides of the hull. Catastrophic damage by fire	1 WIA
11.	Bumper C-12 TF 1-37, 1st Armored Division	One DU kinetic energy penetrator, then hit by anti-tank missile	February 26 Assault on Tawakalna Division	KE round achieved a double penetration of the hull. The anti-tank missile set the storage area of the turret on fire	None
12.	Bumper C-66 TF 1-37, 1st Armored Division	Two small shaped charges	February 26 Assault on Tawakalna Division	Small penetration of the left rear side of the hull. Impact on the turret defeated by armor	3 WIAs
13.	Bumper C-12 TF 4-8th CAV, 3rd Armored Division	73 mm shell from a BMP-1	February 26 Assault on Tawakalna Division	Minor damage to sponson box and .50 machine-gun	1 WIA
14.	Bumper B-24 TF 4-8th CAV, 3rd Armored Division	Enemy indirect fire	February 26 Assault on Tawakalna Division	Damaged to sponson box and duffle bags	None
15.	Bumper C-24 TF 4-8th CAV, 3rd Armored Division	Friendly DPICM	February 26 Assault on Tawakalna Division	Storage area shredded by shrapnel Main gun punctured	None
16.	Unknown number 197th Brigade, 24 Infantry Division	Crippled by enemy fire, then destroyed by DU rounds	February 27 Assault on Tallil airfield	Ammunition blown-up	None
17.	Unknown number 197th Brigade, 24 Infantry Division	Stuck in mud, then destroyed by DU rounds	February 27 Assault on Tallil airfield	Ammunition blown-up	None
18.	Unknown number 197th Brigade, 24 Infantry Division	Stuck in mud, then destroyed by DU rounds	February 27 Assault on Tallil airfield	Ammunition blown-up	None
19.	Bumper HQ66 Commander tank, TF 4-64 Armor, 24 Infantry Division	Two conventional KE or HEAT rounds from a 100 mm gun	February 27 South-west of Basra	120 mm gunner's primary sight (GPS) damaged and fuel-cell punctured. Sight replaced next morning. Tank continued in combat.	None
20.	Unknown number Turret number:5840U Hull number:D10060	Three conventional KE rounds from an Iraqi T-72	Unknown date/location	Two partial penetrations on the rear turret right side (possible fire in the storage area). Cosmetic damage on the turret front DU left armor plate.	None
21.	Bumper A-22< (Note: Details on the identification of this particular tank in the talk page, by a first hand witness.) 2nd Platoon, A Company, TF 4-64, 24 Infantry Division	Secondary explosions from an Iraqi T-72	March 2 Rumeilah Oilfields	Storage area devastated by fire. Ammunition blown-up.	1 WIA

== Interwar upgrades ==
Following lessons learned in the Persian Gulf War, the Abrams and many other U.S. combat vehicles used in the conflict were fitted with Combat Identification Panels to reduce friendly fire incidents. These were fitted on the sides and rear of the turret, with flat panels equipped with a four-cornered 'box' image on either side of the turret front (these can be seen in the below image, similar flat panels also being employed on British Challenger 2 tanks serving in the conflict).

In addition to the Abrams' already heavy armament, some crews were also issued M136 AT4 shoulder-fired anti-tank weapons under the assumption that they might have to engage heavy armor in tight urban areas where the main gun couldn't be brought to bear. Some Abrams were also fitted with a secondary storage bin on the back of the existing bustle rack on the rear of the turret referred to as a bustle rack extension to enable the crew to carry more supplies and personal belongings.

The M1A2 is a further improvement of the M1A1 with a commander's independent thermal viewer and weapon station, position navigation equipment, digital data bus and a radio interface unit. The M1A2 SEP (System Enhancement Package) added digital maps, FBCB2 (Force XXI Battlefield Command Brigade and Below) capabilities, and an improved cooling system to maintain crew compartment temperature with the addition of multiple computer systems to the M1A2 tank.

Further upgrades include depleted uranium armor for all variants, a system overhaul that returns all A1s to like-new condition (M1A1 AIM), a digital enhancement package for the A1 (M1A1D), a commonality program to standardize parts between the U.S. Army and the Marine Corps (M1A1HC) and an electronic upgrade for the A2 (M1A2 SEP).

During Operations Desert Shield and Desert Storm and for Bosnia, some M1A1s were modified with armor upgrades. The M1 can be equipped with mine plow and mine roller attachments if needed. The M1 chassis also serves as a basis for the Grizzly combat engineering vehicle and the M104 Wolverine heavy assault bridge.

Over 8,800 M1 and M1A1 tanks have been produced at a cost of US$2.35–$4.30 million per unit, depending on the variant.

== Iraq War ==
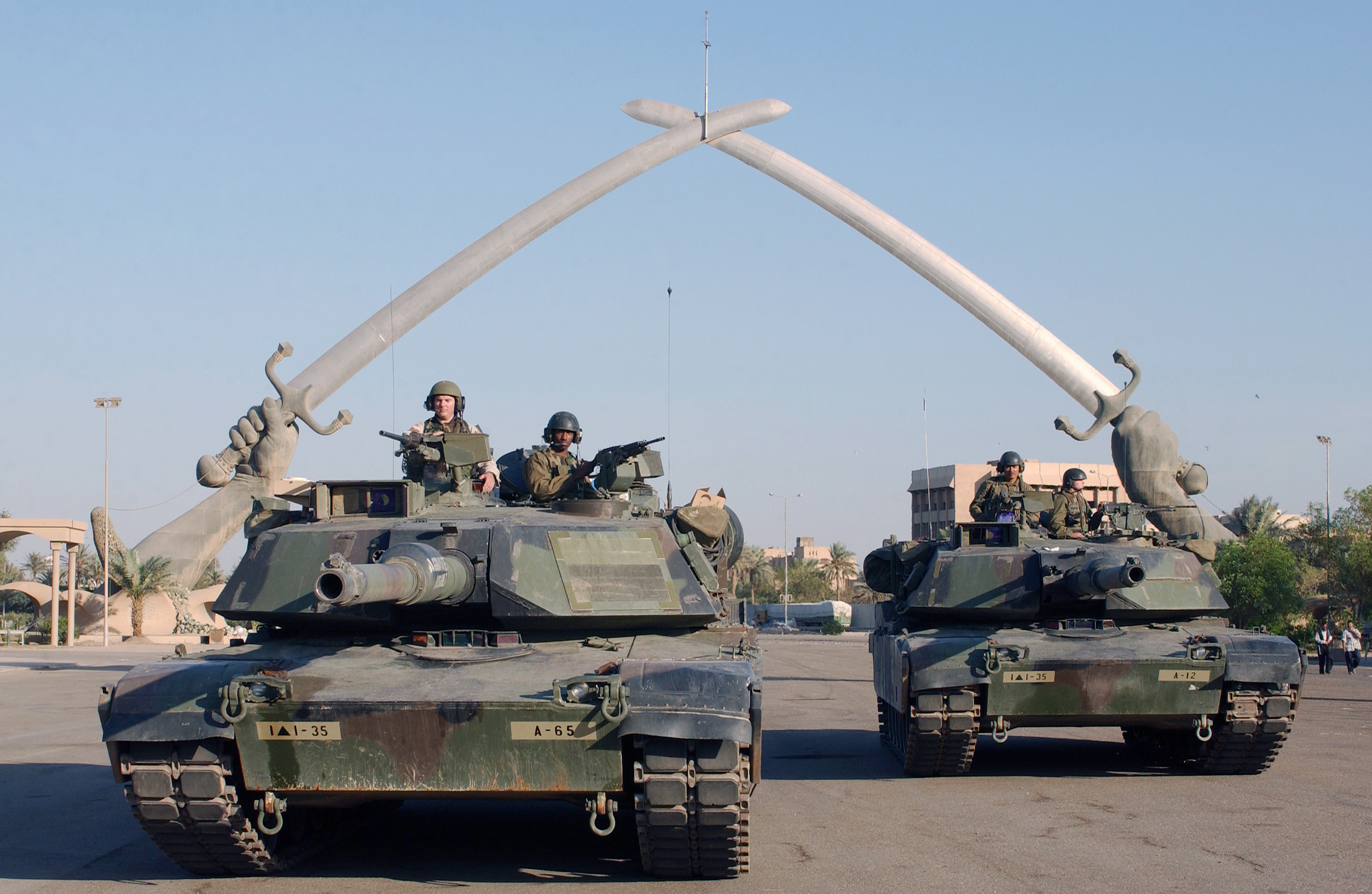
M1A1 Abrams pose for a photo under the "Hands of Victory" in Ceremony Square, Baghdad, Iraq.

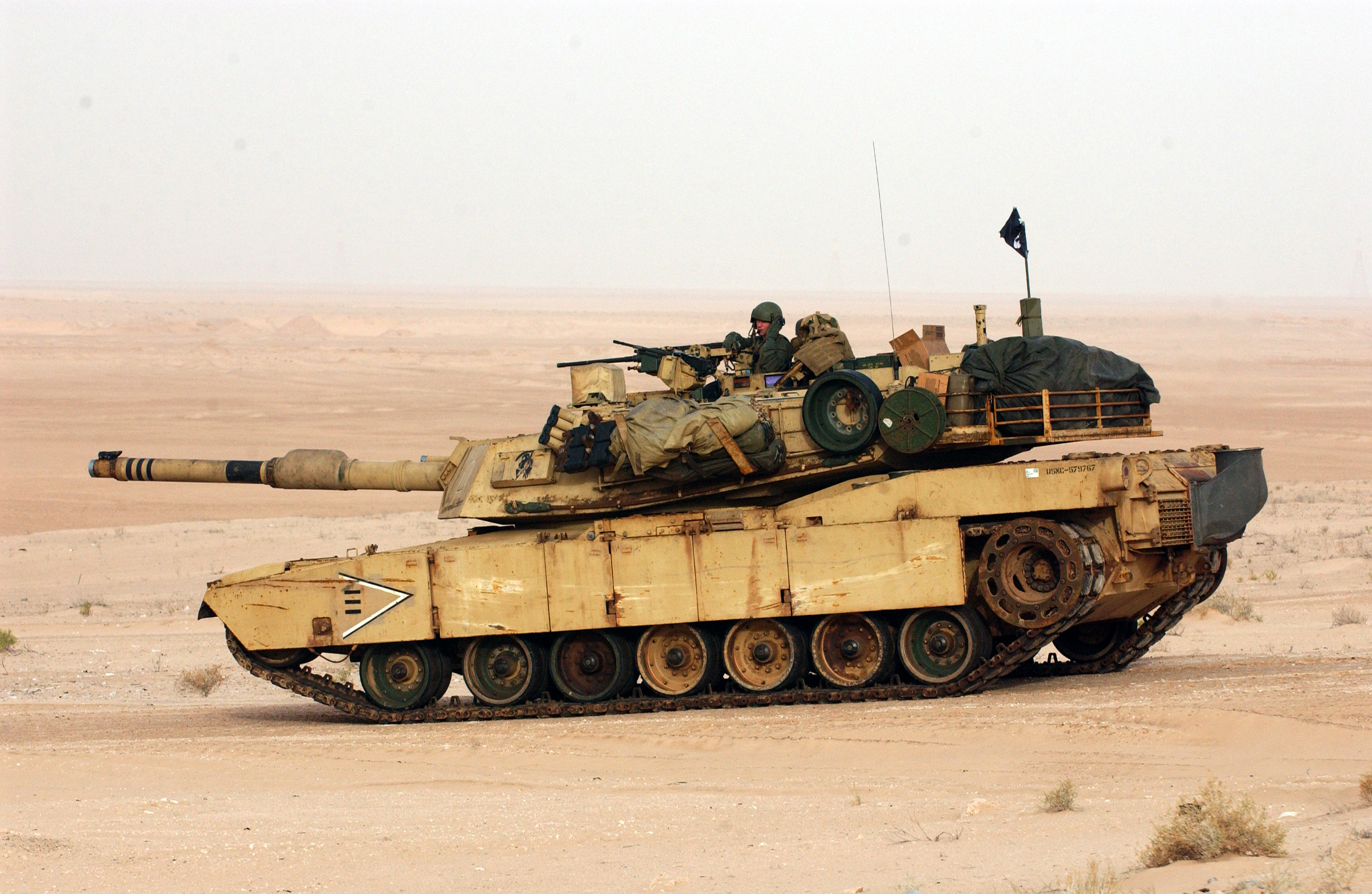
US Marine Corps M1A1 on a live fire exercise in United Arab Emirates, 2003

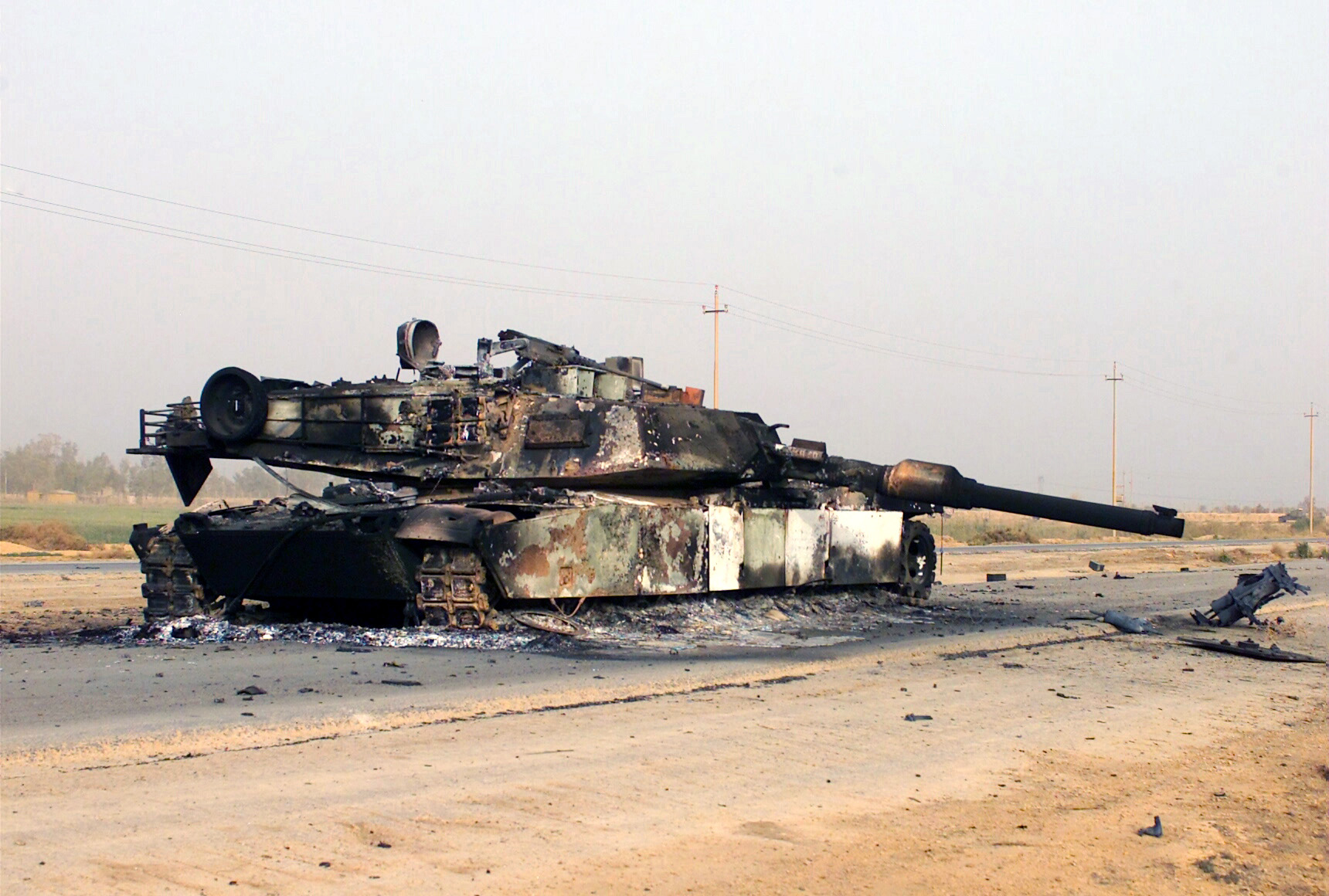
A destroyed USMC M1A1 Abrams rests in front of a Fedayeen camp just outside Jaman Al Juburi, Iraq in April 2003.

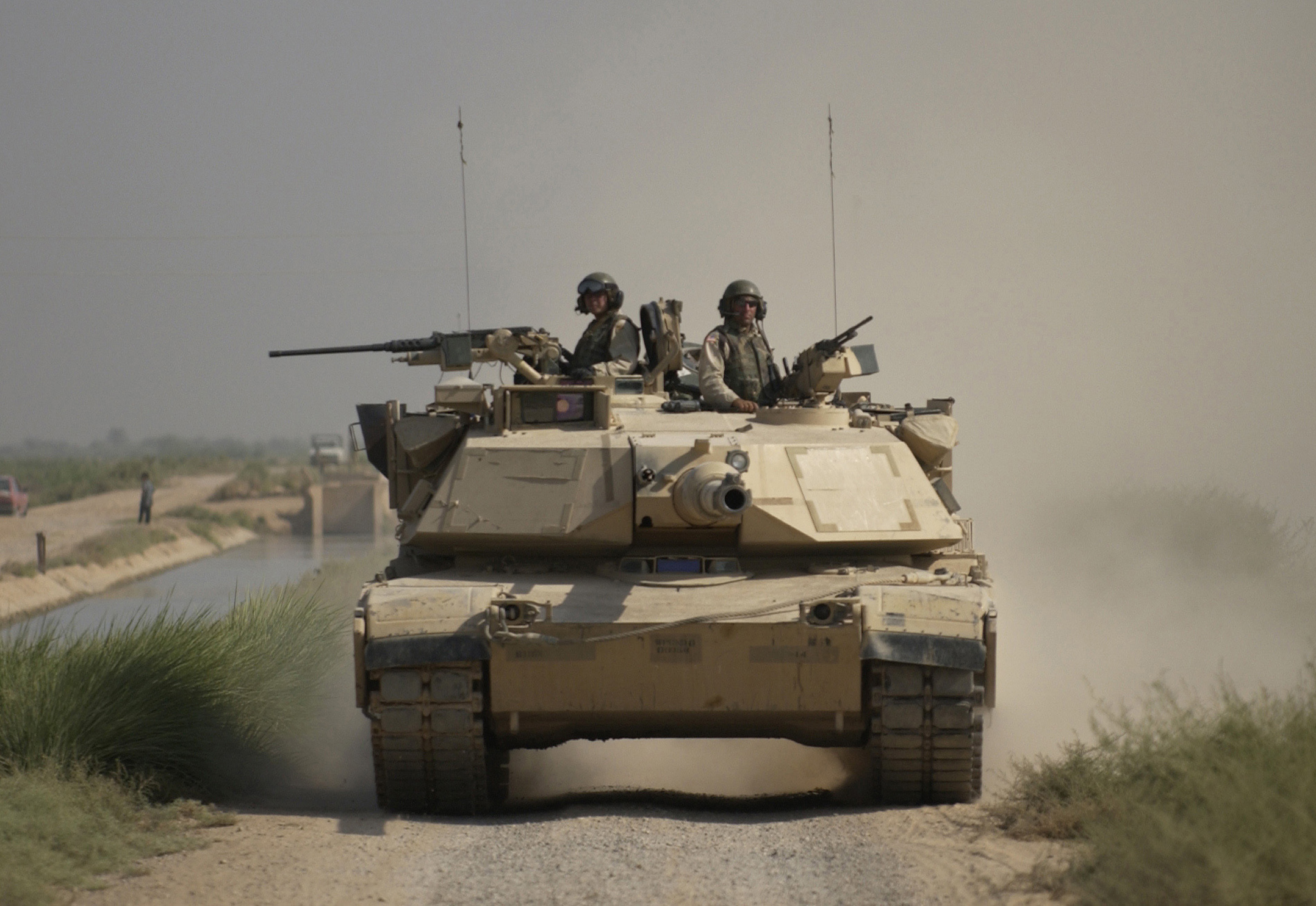
M1A1 conducts reconnaissance in Iraq in September 2004.

Further combat was seen during 2003 when US forces invaded Iraq and deposed the Iraqi leader Saddam Hussein, in an invasion that lasted just 27 days (20 March to 15 April). M1 tanks proved instrumental in leading rapid attacks against the Iraqi military, as exemplified by the so-called 'Thunder Runs.' Abandoned Abrams were purposely destroyed by friendly fire to prevent recovery of vehicle or technology. Damages by 25 mm AP-DU, anti-armor RPG fire, and 12.7 mm rounds was encountered. There were no confirmed instances of anti-tank guided weapons or anti-tank mines striking the US MBTs. However, there is some speculation that Kornet ATGMs were used during the Battle of Najaf to knock out two Abrams, but Russian officials denied selling the weapon to Iraq. What is known is that the two Abrams were struck by unknown weapons, and their ammunition stores ignited. Nevertheless, both crews escaped without serious injury. Some Abrams were disabled by Iraqi infantrymen in ambushes employing short-range antitank rockets, such as the RPG-7. Although the RPG-7 is unable to penetrate the front and sides, the rear and top are vulnerable to this weapon. Frequently the rockets were fired at the tank tracks.

An Abrams was disabled near Karbala after an RPG warhead penetrated the rear engine compartment. There were two reported losses during the Battle of Baghdad, with one Abrams being put out of action after being struck by numerous medium caliber weapons, including 12.7mm rounds which ruptured a fuel bladder stored on an external rack. This started a fire that spread to the engine. On April 4, two Abrams were destroyed by anti-aircraft guns, while on April 5, another was hit by a recoilless rifle and set aflame. After repeated attempts to extinguish the fire, the decision was made to destroy or remove any sensitive equipment. Oil and .50 caliber rounds were scattered in the interior, the ammunition doors were opened and several thermite grenades ignited inside. Another M1 then fired a HEAT round in order to ensure the destruction of the disabled tank. The Abrams was completely disabled but still intact. Later, the Air Force bombed the tank to destroy it in place, and the Iraqi Information Ministry claimed credit for destroying it.

On March 31, 2003, an Abrams belonging to the US Marine Corps drove off the side of a bridge at night, dropping the tank into the Euphrates River and drowning the four crew members. On April 3, 2003, Abrams tanks destroyed seven Iraqi Lion of Babylon tanks in a point-blank skirmish (less than 50 yards (46 m)) near Mahmoudiyah, with no losses for the U.S. side.

As of March 2005, approximately 80 Abrams tanks were forced out of action by enemy attacks; 63 were restored, while 17 were damaged beyond repair.

On June 6, 2006, two of the four soldiers in an Abrams crew were killed during combat operations in Baghdad, when an IED detonated near their M1A2. On August 2, 2006, an M1A1 commanded by US Marine Sgt. George M. Ulloa was hit by two IED's in Al Anbar Province, fatally injuring Sgt. Ulloa. Vulnerabilities exposed during urban combat in the Iraq War were addressed with the Tank Urban Survival Kit (TUSK) modifications, including armor upgrades and a gun shield, issued to some M1 Abrams tanks. It added protection in the rear and side of the tank and improved fighting ability and survival ability in urban environments. By December 2006 more than 530 Abrams tanks had been shipped back to the U.S. for repairs and upgrades.

=== Iraqi usage ===
It was reported that 28 Iraqi Army Abrams had been damaged in fighting with militants, five of them suffering full armor penetration when hit by ATGMs, in the period between 1 January and the end of May 2014; some were destroyed or damaged by militants placing explosive charges on or in the vehicles, highlighting the lack of adequate infantry support provided by Iraqi soldiers. In mid-2014, Iraqi Army Abrams tanks saw action when the Islamic State of Iraq and the Levant launched the June 2014 Northern Iraq offensive. Some Iraqi Army M1A1M tanks were destroyed in fighting against ISIL forces while an unknown number were captured intact. At least one ISIL-controlled M1A1M Abrams was reportedly used in the capture of the Mosul Dam in early August 2014. The Abrams suffered its first heavy losses at the hands of ISIL fighters against Iraqi-operated tanks through planted explosives, anti-tank missiles like the Kornet, and captured tanks later being destroyed by American airstrikes. The chief cause of these losses was the poor training of Iraqi tank operators and lack of infantry coordination. About one-third of the 140 Abrams tanks delivered to the Iraqi Army had been captured or destroyed by ISIL. By December 2014, the Iraqi Army only had about 40 operational Abrams left. That month, the U.S. State Department approved the sale of another 175 Abrams to Iraq. The tanks may be fitted with additional protection features to defend against ISIL mine, roadside bomb, and other attacks including belly armor, reactive armor, 360-degree night vision sensors, mine-clearing blades and rollers, and a wide-area spotlight-equipped remotely operated gun mount. If approved by Congress and funded by the Iraqi government, the improvements could be made within 18 months. By late 2015, some Iraqi Abrams tanks that had been dropped off at repair facilities were re-equipped with Russian heavy machine guns firing Iranian-manufactured ammunition, which may violate sales agreements prohibiting material usage by Shiite militias and the unsanctioned addition of foreign weapons.

From February to April 2016, Iraqi Army forces took back the town of Hit from ISIL. Three Iraqi-operated M1A1 Abrams tanks took part in the operation, but two broke down early on. The lone working Abrams performed exceptionally in combat, destroying enemy IEDs, punching holes in defenses, and maneuvering between multiple engagements. U.S. forces monitoring Iraqi movements thought multiple tanks were in operation and were surprised to learn it had been working alone, crediting its success to the U.S.-trained crew. The Abrams was nicknamed "The Beast" and has achieved somewhat of a folklore status among the Iraqi people.

In October 2017, Iraqi M1A1 Abrams tanks were cited by Kurdish sources as key to the Iraqi victory at the Battle of Kirkuk, as the Kurdish Peshmerga possessed no weaponry which could counter the tanks. However, later in the war at Alton-Kopri and Zumar, the Kurdish Peshmerga destroyed two Iraqi Abrams tanks in two days with the MILAN missile system.

== Yemeni Civil War (2014–present) ==
Starting from 2015, the Saudi Arabian Army deployed their M1 tanks during the Saudi Arabian-led intervention in Yemen. While the exact number of losses is not clear due to poor reporting from the conflict, it became clear that a certain number of Saudi tanks were lost to enemy forces using ATGMs, RPGs and mines. During summer 2016, a deal to sell 153 more M1 tanks to Saudi Arabia was revealed, with 20 of them being tagged as "battle damage replacements", implying that a similar number of Saudi M1 tanks were lost to the enemy.

== War in Afghanistan ==
Operating tanks in Afghanistan can be difficult due to the terrain, although Canada and Denmark had deployed tanks to Afghanistan that have been specifically upgraded to fight in the tough Afghan environment. The U.S. sent 16 M1A1 Abrams tanks and 115 Marines to southern Afghanistan to support operations in the Helmand and Kandahar provinces in late 2010.

== U.S. Marine Corps divestment and transfers to Army ==
The Marine Corps began divesting itself of the Abrams in 2020 as part of a force restructuring plan intended to improve the Marine Corps' ability to contend with near-peer adversaries in the Pacific region, specifically to deter a possible Chinese invasion of Taiwan. Under the restructuring the Marine Corps would shift its strategy towards distributed operations, an area planners felt the Abrams was unsuited for. As of 2021 the Marine Corps had transferred most of its 452 tanks to the Army, with remaining stocks in storage scheduled for transfer by 2023.

== Russo-Ukrainian War (2023-present) ==
The U.S. announced on 25 January 2023, that they would deliver 31 M1A1 Abrams tanks to Ukraine which was completed by September 2023. These tanks have since faced hindrances and challenges common to all armored vehicles in the Russo-Ukrainian War, with mixed support from Ukrainian crews. Key issues include vulnerability to loitering munitions, supply and parts shortages, and inability to operate the tanks in a combined arms role. Some Ukrainian field mechanics have modified their M1 tanks with slat armor as well as Kontakt-1 reactive armor bricks to improve on armor shortcomings.

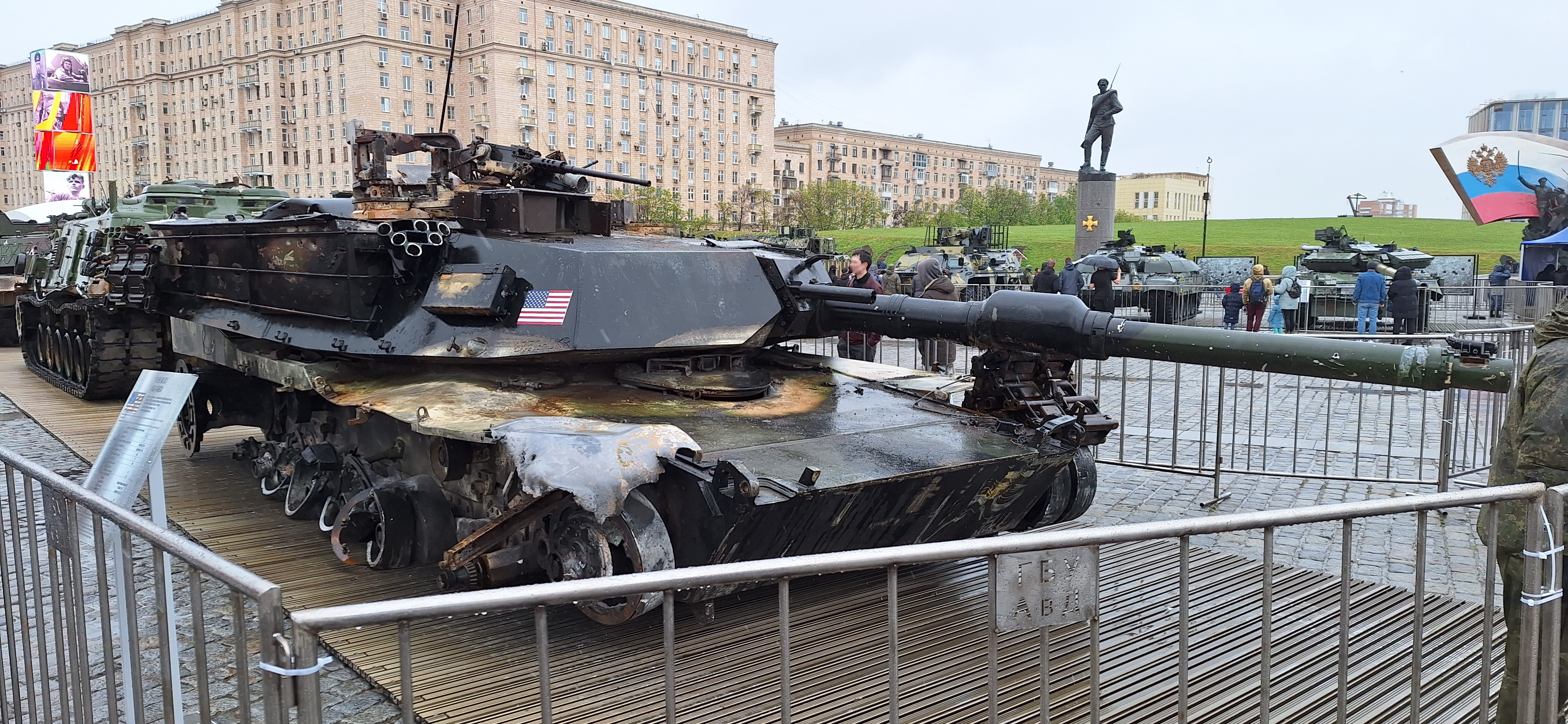
A captured M1A1 Abrams on display at Moscow's Victory Park on Poklonnaya Hill

In early February 2024, during the Battle of Avdiivka, M1A1 Abrams tanks of the 47th Mechanized Brigade were first seen in use. On 26 February 2024, in Berdychi, an M1A1 tank was lost after it was destroyed by Russian FPV loitering munitions; by April 2024, at least 5 Abrams tanks were lost, the rest being rotated away from the front line. In May 2024, a captured M1A1 tank was shown on display in Moscow.

During the Kursk campaign, M1A1 Abrams tanks were again used by the 47th Brigade, where they were seen alongside M2 Bradley vehicles providing fire support. Several M1A1 tanks were abandoned and then captured by Russian forces when Ukrainian forces retreated from Kursk.

Australia announced on 16 October 2024, that they would deliver 49 M1A1 AIM tanks to Ukraine which was completed by July 2025.

== Future ==
During the 1980s and 1990s, the Block III main battle tank from the Armored Systems Modernization (ASM) program was expected to succeed the M1 Abrams family in the 1990s. The design has an unmanned turret with a 140 mm main gun, as well as improved protection. The end of the Cold War would ultimately end the program. The tracked M8 Armored Gun System was conceived as a possible supplement for the Abrams in U.S. service for low-intensity conflict in the early 1990s. Prototypes were made but the program was canceled. The 8-wheeled M1128 mobile gun system was designed to supplement the Abrams in U.S. service for low-intensity conflict. It has been introduced into service and, though mobile, it has proven to be quite vulnerable.

The U.S. Army's Future Combat Systems' XM1202 Mounted Combat System was to replace the Abrams in U.S. service and was in late stages of development when funding for the program was cut from the DoD's budget.

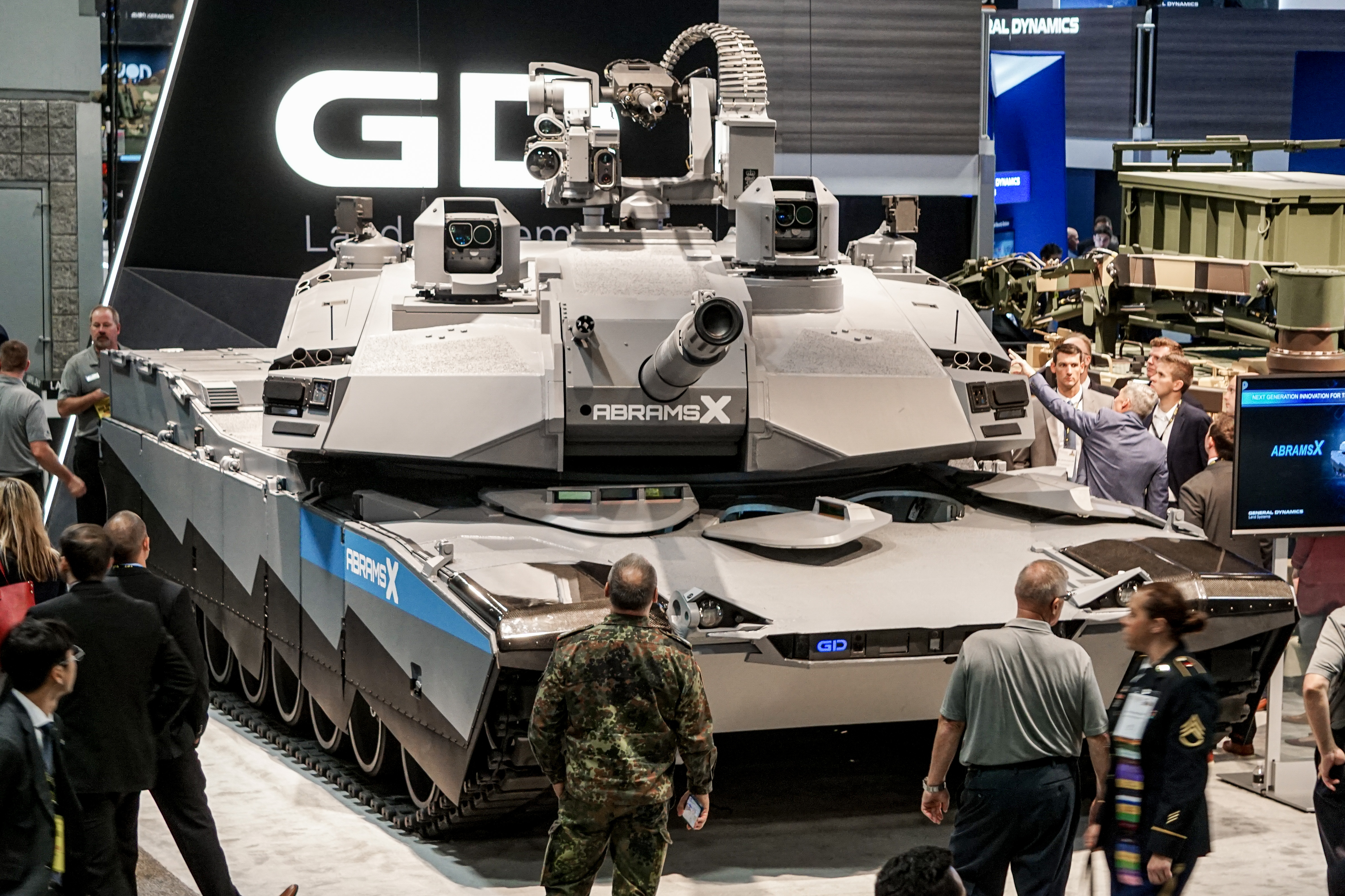
AbramsX at AUSA 2022

In September 2009, the Army Times and Marine Corps Times published reports that US Army researchers have begun the process of designing a version of the Abrams that will carry the M1A3 label. According to the reports, the Army is seeking to reduce the weight of the vehicle to approximately 60 tons from its current operational weight of roughly 75 tons. Additionally, the M1A3 may incorporate a new generation of advanced networking capabilities and enhanced armor protection. Other improvements are to include a lighter 120 mm gun, added road wheels with improved suspension, a more durable track, lighter armor, long-range precision armaments, and infrared camera and laser detectors. A new internal computer system is also planned, with current cabling replaced by fiber-optic cables that can reduce weight by two tons. The Army had planned to build prototypes by 2014 and to begin to field the first combat-ready M1A3s by 2017, but this never came to pass. Instead, the U.S. Army produced incremental improvements to the M1A2 in the system enhancement packages, culminating in the M1A2 SEPv3. The SEPv4 had begun testing when the program was cancelled. Instead, the Army would focus efforts on restarting development of the M1A3, which would again focus on reducing weight.

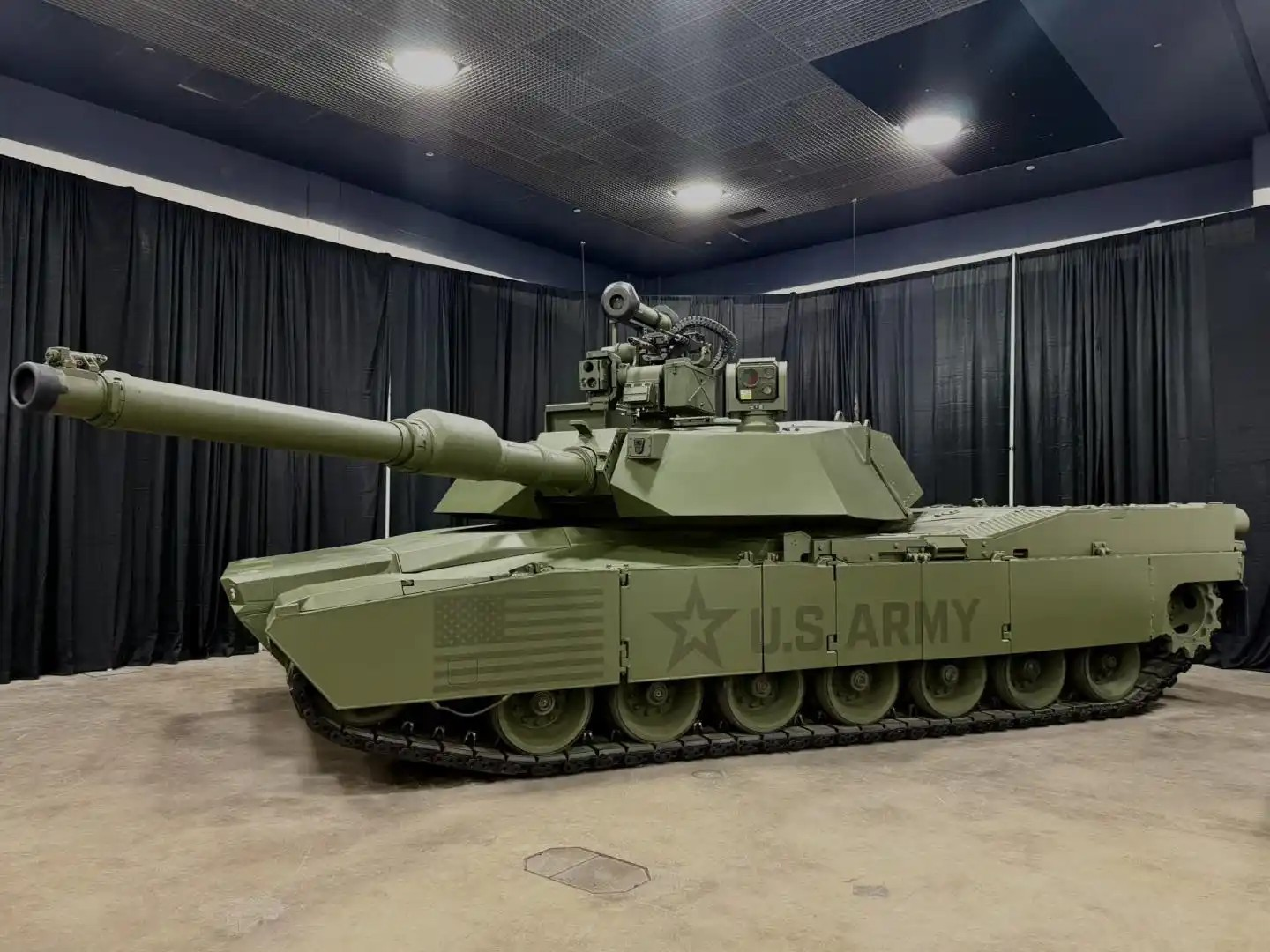
M1E3 Abrams early prototype, North American International Auto Show 2026.

=== Production ===
The military planned to close the M1 Abrams factory in Ohio from 2013 to 2016 to save over US$1 billion. In 2017 the plant would reopen to upgrade existing tanks. The downside to the three-year plant closing is the loss of the skilled human capital required to build the M1. These types of job skills must be learned on the job as the building is too unique to offer any type of educational program in a trade school environment.

By August 2013, Congress had allocated $181 million for buying parts and upgrading Abrams systems to mitigate industrial base risks and sustain development and production capability. Congress and General Dynamics were criticized for redirecting money to keep production lines open and accused of "forcing the Army to buy tanks it didn't need." General Dynamics asserted that a four-year shutdown would cost $1.1–1.6 billion to reopen the line, depending on the length of the shutdown, whether machinery would be kept operating, and whether the plant's components would be completely removed. They contended that the move was to upgrade Army National Guard units to expand a "pure fleet" and maintain production of identified "irreplaceable" subcomponents; a prolonged shutdown could cause their makers to lose their ability to produce them and foreign tank sales were not guaranteed to keep production lines open. Even though money is being spent to protect the industrial base, some feel those strategic choices should not be made by members of Congress, especially those with the facilities in their district. There is still risk of production gaps even with production extended through 2015; with funds awarded before recapitalization is needed, budgetary pressures may push planned new upgrades for the Abrams from 2017 to 2019. In December 2014, Congress again allocated $120 million, against the wishes of the Army, for Abrams upgrades including improving gas mileage by integrating an auxiliary power unit to decrease idle time fuel consumption and upgrading the tank's sights and sensors.

At the end of 2016, tank production/refurbishment had fallen to a rate of one per month, with less than 100 workers on site. However, the Trump administration entered office in 2017 and made rebuilding the military a priority, thus the Lima Army Tank Plant was given a new lease on life. It was reported in 2018 that the Army had ordered 135 tanks re-built to new standards, employment was over 500 workers and expected to rise to 1,000.

== Program managers ==
- Lieutenant General Robert J. Baer (July 1972–July 1977)
- Lieutenant General Donald M. Babers (July 1977–June 1980)
- Major General Duard D. Ball (July 1980–May 1983)
- Major General Robert J. Sunell (June 1983–July 1984)
- Colonel William R. Rittenhouse (July 1984–February 1987)
- Colonel Joseph Raffiani, Jr (M1A1; September 1983–June 1987)
- Colonel John E. Longhouser (June 1987–?)

== Bibliography ==
- Kelly, Orr (1989). King of the Killing Zone. New York, New York: W. W. Norton & Company. ISBN 0-425-12304-9.
- Green, Michael (1992). M1 Abrams Main Battle Tank: The Combat and Development History of the General Dynamics M1 and M1A1 Tanks. Motorbooks International. ISBN 0-87938-597-9.
- Halberstadt, Hans (1991). Desert Storm Ground War. Motorbooks International. ISBN 978-0879385613.
- Hunnicutt, Richard Pearce (15 September 2015) [1990]. Abrams: A History of the American Main Battle Tank. Battleboro, VT: Echo Point Books & Media. ISBN 978-1-62654-166-5.
- Staats, Elmer B. (28 November 1977). Department Of Defense Consideration Of West Germany's Leopard As The Army's New Main Battle Tank (PDF) (Report). p. i.</ref> Although testing commenced in 1976, the two nations were unable to reconcile their nationalistic differences, so a compromise was made that would have both tanks share common parts.<ref>Foss, Christopher F., ed. (1983). Jane's Armour and Artillery 1983–84 (4th ed.). London: Jane's Publishing Company. ISBN 0-7106-0781-4.
- Zaloga, Steven; Sarson, Peter (1993). M1 Abrams Main Battle Tank 1982–1992. New Vanguard (Book 2). Oxford, UK: Osprey Publishing. ISBN 1-85532-283-8.
- Zaloga, Steven J. (2009). M1 Abrams vs T-72 Ural: Operation Desert Storm 1991. Oxford, UK; New York: Osprey Publishing. ISBN 978-1-84603-407-7. LCCN 2009502059.
- Zaloga, Steven J. (2019). M1 Abrams Main Battle Tank 1993–2018. Oxford, UK; New York: Osprey Publishing. ISBN 978-1-47283-178-1.
- Zaloga, Steven J. (1985). Windrow, Martin (ed.). The M1 Abrams Battle Tank. London: Osprey Publishing. ISBN 0-85045-584-7.
