= Robert J. Baer =

United States Army general

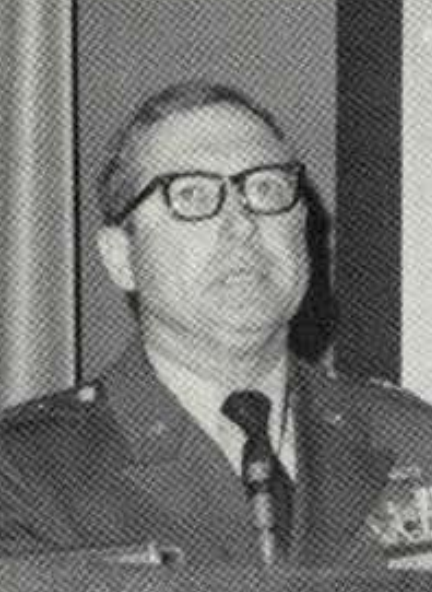
- Baer speaking at the 1975 Annual Armor Conference
- Born: 12 August 1924
- Died: 26 February 2011 (aged 86)
- Military career
- Allegiance: United States
- Branch: United States Army
- Service years: 1947–1980
- Rank: Lieutenant general
- Commands: Project Manager M1 Abrams
- Conflicts: Vietnam War

Robert Jacob Baer was a lieutenant general in the United States Army who was the first program manager of the XM1 tank (later M1 Abrams) program.

Baer entered the U.S. Military Academy in 1944 and graduated with the class of 1947. Baer served in the Army in Germany in the early 1950s. He earned a Silver Star and an Air Medal with Oak Leaf Clusters during one of two tours in Vietnam War as a brigade commander. In 1969 Baer was put in a Department of Defense position at the Pentagon, where he managed tank and military vehicle programs. In July 1972 Baer, then a brigadier general, was given the program manager role for the new XM1 tank program. Baer was succeeded by lieutenant general Donald M. Babers in 1977.

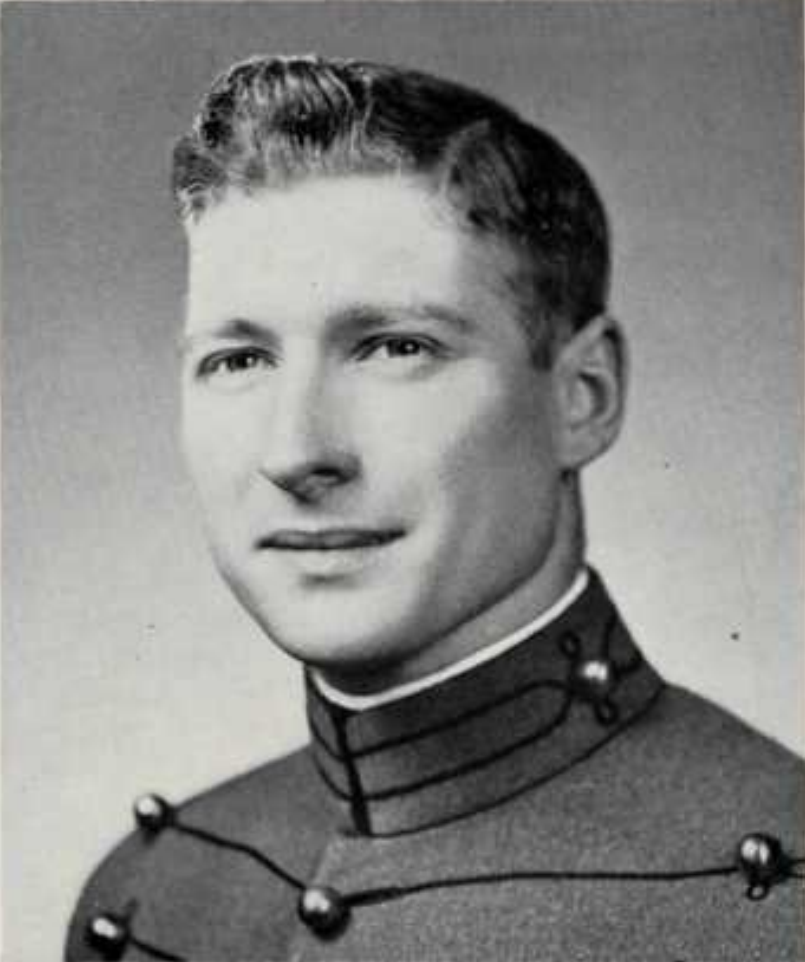
At West Point

Baer's son John Baer was a Lieutenant colonel assigned to the 11th Armored Cavalry Regiment in the Fulda Gap, where he commanded a squadron with Abrams tanks.
