= Philip W. Lett =

Philip Wood Lett
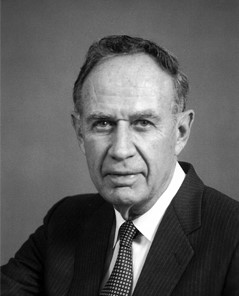
- Born: May 4, 1922; Newton, Alabama, US
- Died: June 6, 2014 (aged 92); Boulder, Colorado, US
- Known for: M1 Abrams

Philip Wood Lett (May 4, 1922 – June 6, 2014) was an American armored fighting vehicle engineer that lead the Chrysler Defense design team in the XM1 tank program, whose work resulted in the M1 Abrams tank currently in service with the U.S. Army.

== Biography ==
Philip Wood Lett was born on May 4, 1922, in Newton, Alabama, to mother Lily Octavia Kennedy and Philip Wood Lett Sr. After his first job of picking cotton, Lett joined the U.S. Army during WWII and served with the Army Corps of Engineers. After the war, Lett graduated from Alabama Polytechnic Institute (currently called Auburn) in 1944 with a B. S. degree in mechanical engineering, before receiving a master's degree in engineering from the University of Alabama in 1947. He completed his education in 1951 by earning a PhD in mechanical engineering from the University of Michigan.

Lett joined Chrysler Defense in 1950, and became involved in the design and development of the M48 main battle tank (MBT). As project engineer, Lett supervised the technical design and coordinated with the Army in the testing and evaluation process. In 1954, Lett became chief engineer and led the design and development of the Army's next MBT, the M60 tank.

In 1972, the Army began the XM1 tank program, and in June 1973 awarded contracts to General Motors and Chrysler Defense to construct prototype vehicles. Lett led the Chrysler Defence team in the competition, in which the Chrysler XM1 design in won the Army contract for Full Scale Engineering Development in November 1976. Lett continued to lead the M1's development until 1987.

He was married to Katy Lee Howell from June 26, 1948, until her death on February 6, 2006. He died on June 6, 2014.

== See also ==
- M1 Abrams
- M60 tank
