= Donald M. Babers =

United States Army general (1931–2024)

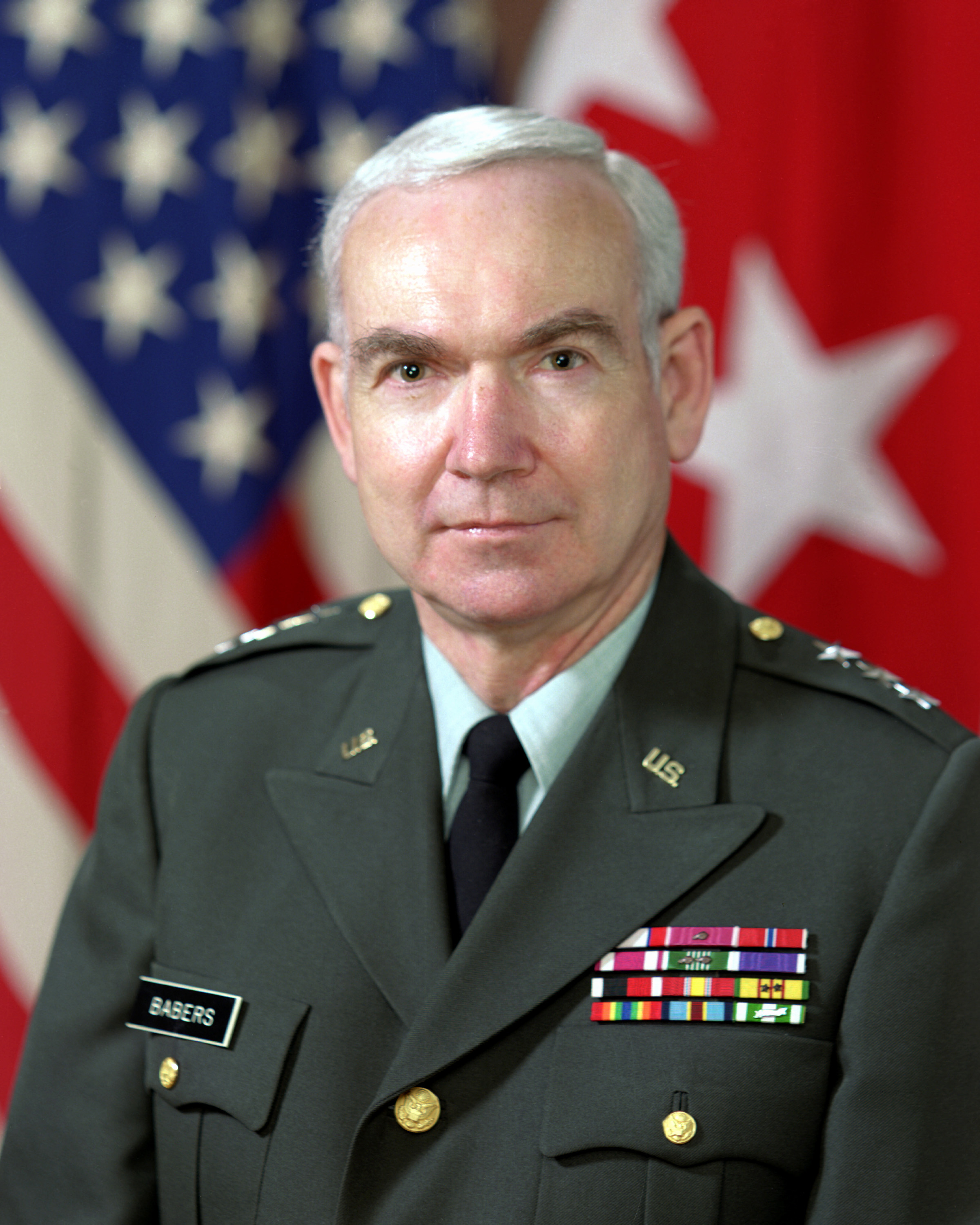
- Born: 15 May 1931; Newkirk, New Mexico U.S.
- Died: 15 October 2024 (aged 93)
- Military career
- Allegiance: United States
- Branch: United States Army
- Service years: 1954–1986
- Rank: Lieutenant general
- Commands: Director, Defense Logistics Agency; Deputy Commanding General for Materiel Readiness, U.S. Army Materiel Development and Readiness Command
- Conflicts: Vietnam War

Donald Melton Babers (15 May 1931 – 15 October 2024) was a lieutenant general in the United States Army who served as director of the Defense Logistics Agency from 1984 to 1986. He was commissioned in 1954 through the ROTC program at Oklahoma A&M, also having attained a Bachelor of Arts degree in secondary education. Babers earned an M.B.A. degree from Syracuse University in 1964. He died on 15 October 2024, at the age of 93. His widow, Marilyn, died on 26 July 2026.
