= Music of Arizona =

The music of Arizona began with Indigenous music of North America made by Indigenous peoples of Arizona. In the 20th century, Mexican immigrants popularized Banda, corridos, mariachi and conjunto. Other major influences come from styles popular throughout the rest of the United States.

== Regional scenes ==
=== Flagstaff ===
Flagstaff has a community (non-professional) orchestra, the Flagstaff Symphony Orchestra. The FSO includes both townspeople and faculty and students from Northern Arizona University. The Orpheum Theater is the largest performing venue in northern Arizona. The city hosts two music festivals, the Flagstaff Folk Festival and the Flagstaff Music Festival.

Native American flautist R. Carlos Nakai, of Navajo/Ute origin, was born in Flagstaff.

Navajo punk band Blackfire formed in Flagstaff.

=== Phoenix ===
Phoenix has been called a "rock mecca" by Jim Adkins of the Mesa rock band Jimmy Eat World. Tempe (home of Arizona State University) and Mesa also coexist with Phoenix as part of the Arizona musical scene. Other Phoenix bands include the Meat Puppets, American Standards, Gin Blossoms (lead guitarist Doug Hopkins died in '93 in Tempe), Phunk Junkeez, Chronic Future, Dead Hot Workshop, The Jetzons, and Roger Clyne and the Peacemakers.

In the 1960s, rock and R&B bands inspired by British Invasion groups like The Beatles appeared in Phoenix. Musicians to emerge from this era include Alice Cooper, and Bill Spooner of The Tubes. The group Pages was formed by Phoenix residents Richard Page and Steve George, who later formed the nucleus of the Phoenix pop-rock group Mr. Mister (who had 2 #1 Hot 100 hits, including "Broken Wings" in 1985).

Dolan Ellis has lived in Phoenix most of his adult life. He moved to LA in the early 1960s, where he was an original member of the Grammy-winning folk group The New Christy Minstrels. Dolan returned to Phoenix while the group was still at its peak. In February 1966, Governor Sam Goddard appointed Dolan as Arizona's Official State Balladeer, which was renewed under ten consecutive governors. He was selected as the first Arizona Culture Keeper, and Senator John McCain read his accomplishments into the U.S. Congressional Record. Dolan spent a few years away from Phoenix from about 1993 through 2003, to found the Arizona Folklore Preserve in Ramsey Canyon. He still commutes to the AFP, where he continues to serve as Artist in Residence, about twice a month.

Punk rock arrived in Phoenix in 1977, when the Consumers, the Liars and the Exterminators were among the first local bands in the genre. The Exterminators featured vocalist Dan Clark (Johnny Macho), guitarist Doug Clark (Buzzy Murder), drummer Don Bolles and bassist Rob Graves. The band broke up in 1978, when many early Phoenix punks moved to Los Angeles. There, Bolles joined the Germs, while Graves played with The Bags and The Gun Club before forming 45 Grave with Bolles. In Phoenix, Dan Clark went on to The Feederz and Doug Clark to Mighty Sphincter. The Exterminators did not record an album in the 1970s. In 2016 the Clarks and Bolles reunited, with Cris Kirkwood of the Meat Puppets replacing the late Graves on bass and producing the band's first album, Product of America, released on Slope Records.

In the early 1980s, Phoenix hardcore punk bands included The Feederz, JFA (Jodie Foster's Army) and Meat Puppets, the latter of which had country influences and became a major influence on grunge. Other rock bands of the time included Flotsam and Jetsam, Sun City Girls, Sacred Reich, Caterwaul, and Mighty Sphincter.

During the 1990s, Chester Bennington (d.2017), lead singer for Linkin Park, spent several years in Phoenix as the lead singer for the post-grunge band Grey Daze. Bennington also collaborated with Phoenix musician DJ Z-Trip. This period also saw the formation and rise of pop punk/emo band Jimmy Eat World. Bob Stubbs, formerly of Social Distortion, played drums in local bands. In the mid 1990s independent punk rock record labels, Bad Stain Records and Dirty Records both formed, signing various local punk bands at the time. Dirty Records released albums from the punk bands Dirty Laundry, Mandingo, The Twits, and Adam's Alcoholic's. Bad Stain Records released albums from Subject Mad, D-I-X, Corrupt Citizen, and Dirty Laundry, and released a popular series of compilation CD's featuring various local punk and ska bands, as well as popular national bands including Less Than Jake, At The Drive In, Buckwild, The Weakerthans, Link 80, Yellowcard, and more!

The late 1990s and early 2000s saw an emerging rock scene in Phoenix and the surrounding areas. Indie rock bands included The Stiletto Formal, Gloritone, Fine China, Dear and the Headlights, Peachcake, and The Format. Punk influenced artists included Where Eagles Dare, Authority Zero, Bad Stain Recording artists Against The Majority (ATM) and Numbers On Napkins, and Hit and Run Jimmy, Haunted Cologne, and Andrew Jackson Jihad. Psychostick, a comedy style rock band, was formed in Tempe. In 1998 a band from Phoenix toured the midwest called Thee illuminatix, catching the attention of Jello Biafra.

There was also a post-hardcore scene including bands like Scary Kids Scaring Kids, Blessthefall, Eyes Set To Kill, The Word Alive, Greeley Estates, and American Standards. The middle years of the decade was marked by the transition from hardcore punk into death metal with bands such as The Irish Front, Knights of the Abyss and Job for a Cowboy.

Singer CeCe Peniston grew up in Phoenix and began her career in 1991.

Pop Rock band The Summer Set is based out of Scottsdale.

Country music star Dierks Bentley is from Phoenix and Michelle Branch is from Sedona. Country star Marty Robbins had a #1 Billboard Hot 100 hit with "El Paso" in 1959.

Arizona residents who have had varying success on the American Idol show include Jordin Sparks who won the sixth season. She was later selected to sing the National Anthem at Super Bowl XLII, which happened to take place in her hometown of Glendale, Arizona. On the seventh season of American Idol, Arizona had two contestants make it to the final twelve. David Hernandez came in twelfth place while Brooke White made it to fifth place. The eighth season featured a regional audition at the Jobing.com Arena in Glendale on July 25, 2008. Several contestants made it to the "Hollywood phase" but only one made it into the final twelve: Scott MacIntyre, who came in eighth place. Despite this, Phoenix was called one of the "year's standout cities."

Phoenix is home to the Phoenix Symphony Orchestra.

Hispanic/Latino music has a large following here, and numerous import stores exist throughout the city for it. There are also several Spanish-language music radio stations. The annual Fiestas Patrias celebration brings Mexican groups including Los Tigres del Norte.

Folk musician Joe Bethancourt was a long-time resident.

=== Venues ===
Phoenix music venues have included Comerica Theatre, Ashley Furniture HomeStore Pavilion, Long Wong's, The Rebel Lounge (formerly The Mason Jar), Modified Arts, Trunk Space, Paper Heart Gallery, Club Red, Marquee Theatre, The Van Buren, Crescent Ball Room, Valley Bar, the Nile Theater, The Rhythm Room, and Compton Terrace. Local entertainment companies include Fizzle Promotions. There are dance clubs in Phoenix, Scottsdale, and Tempe. Phoenix is still a common place for "raves", dance parties hosted in typically in warehouses, legal venues, or isolated desert locations.

== Tucson ==
The city of Tucson, Arizona, has an Official Troubador position, currently Ted Ramirez. Ramirez is a singer and songwriter who uses both English and Spanish lyrics, as well as singing in O’odham; he is also an Arizona Culture Keeper. The Ronstadt family, which includes Linda Ronstadt, are from Tucson. Linda Ronstadt had a #1 Hot 100 hit with "You're No Good" in 1975.

Tucson's music festivals include the Norteño Music Festival & Street Fair, which celebrates the Mexican-American style of norteño. Tucson also hosts the Tucson Symphony Orchestra.

The first weekend in May each year, the Tucson Kitchen Musicians Association hosts the Tucson Folk Festival, a two-day event on four stages, with about 100 acoustic music acts. The first festival was held in 1986.

Lalo Guerrero, known as the "Father of Chicano Music" and a recipient of the National Medal of Arts, was born in Tucson, where he lived until his early 20s. He died on March 17, 2005, at the age of 89, and was one of the first inductees to the Arizona Music and Entertainment Hall of Fame.

Travis Edmonson was named Tucson's "Singing Ambassador of Goodwill" in 1975, a mayoral appointment that still stands today. Edmonson grew up in Nogales and spent time in Mexico developing a talent for singing and playing the native music of Mexico. Edmonson and his friend actor Roger Smith were active musicians at the University of Arizona. Edmonson went on to become a member of the Gateway Singers and was half of the folk and Mexican music duo Bud & Travis that recorded intermittently from about 1958 to 1965, producing 10 albums. Edmonson was inducted as an Arizona Culture Keeper in September 2005, where his citation includes these words: "Edmonson has been at the vanguard of the movement to bring Latin music north of the border."

Other notable Tucson musicians include Bob Nolan, Katie Lee, and Rex Allen. Bob Nolan, a founder of the Sons of the Pioneers and the composer of songs such as "Cool Water" and "Tumbling Tumbleweeds", was a Tucson High graduate and wrote "Cool Water" while still in school.

Katie Lee moved to Tucson around the age of 1, and is an actress and folk singer. She is also an activist, and her cause is documented in her book, All My Rivers Are Gone. Lee also wrote a book about cowboy music and recorded a double LP (with Travis Edmonson) by the same name, Ten Thousand Goddam Cattle.

Rex Allen was a singing cowboy who performed after Roy Rogers. A native of Willcox, he lived in Tucson in his later years.

At the age of 11, John Denver received his first guitar from his grandmother while living in Tucson.

In the 1980s and throughout the 1990s, Tucson was the site of an underground music scene centered on Club Congress and a handful of other clubs and backyard parties located in the neighborhoods near the University of Arizona. Indie rock and punk rock bands included Giant Sand, The Bled, Machines of Loving Grace, Digital Leather, Rainer Ptacek, Doo Rag, Bob Log III, Malignus Youth, Naked Prey and The Sidewinders (later the Sand Rubies).

== See also ==
- Articles on Arizona musicians
- Articles on Arizona musical groups
- Articles on Music venues in Arizona
- Indigenous music of North America#Southwest
- Navajo music
- Pueblo music
- Yaqui music
- Yuman music
