= Alternative R&B =

Stylistic alternative to contemporary R&B

- Other names: Alt-R&B; PBR&B; indie R&B; left-field R&B; emo R&B; experimental R&B
- Stylistic origins: R&B; indie rock; electronic; progressive soul; hip-hop; alternative rock
- Cultural origins: Mid-2000s, U.S. and Canada

Fusion genres
- Alternative pop

Other topics
- African-American music; alternative dance; alternative hip-hop; chillwave; neo soul; progressive soul; Toronto sound

Alternative R&B (also referred to as alt-R&B, indie R&B, and originally known as PBR&B, avant-R&B, hipster R&B, emo R&B, or R-Neg-B) is a music genre denoting a stylistic alternative to contemporary R&B that began in the mid 2000s and came to prominence with musical artists such as Frank Ocean, Khalid, SZA, Summer Walker, Jhené Aiko, Brent Faiyaz, Zayn Malik, Tyler, the Creator, Steve Lacy, Childish Gambino, Miguel, Drake, The Weeknd, Kehlani, Tinashe, Bryson Tiller, PartyNextDoor, Tory Lanez, 6lack, and others. It is considered to be "more progressive and diverse" than its mainstream counterpart.

== Etymology ==
"Alternative R&B" was once used by the music industry during the late 1990s to market neo soul artists, such as D'Angelo, Erykah Badu, and Maxwell. There has been a variety of discussion about the differing genre terms, with several critics describing the music under the broad category of "alternative R&B" or "indie R&B". The term "hipster R&B" has also been used.

In 2011, Sound of the City writer Eric Harvey coined the term "PBR&B" on Twitter. Three years later, amazed and distressed at how far the term—meant as a joke—had traveled, Harvey wrote an extensive essay about it for Pitchfork. "PBR&B"—a combination of "PBR" (the abbreviation for Pabst Blue Ribbon, a beer most recently associated with the hipster subculture) and R&B. Slate suggests the name "R-Neg-B", as a reference to "negging". The genre has sometimes been called "noir&B". However, the terms are often criticized for "pigeonholing" artists into hipster subculture and being used in a derisive manner.

== Characteristics ==
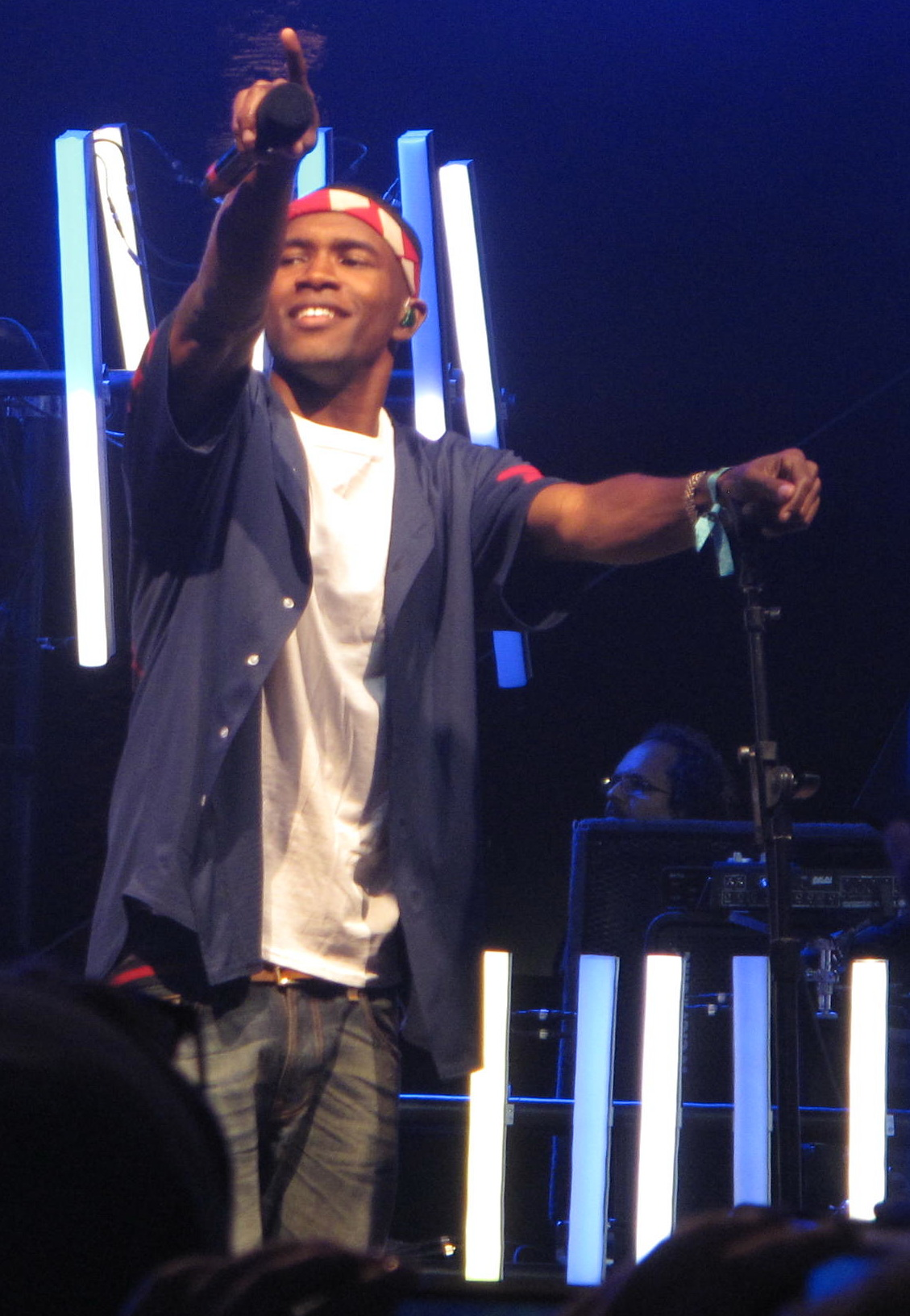
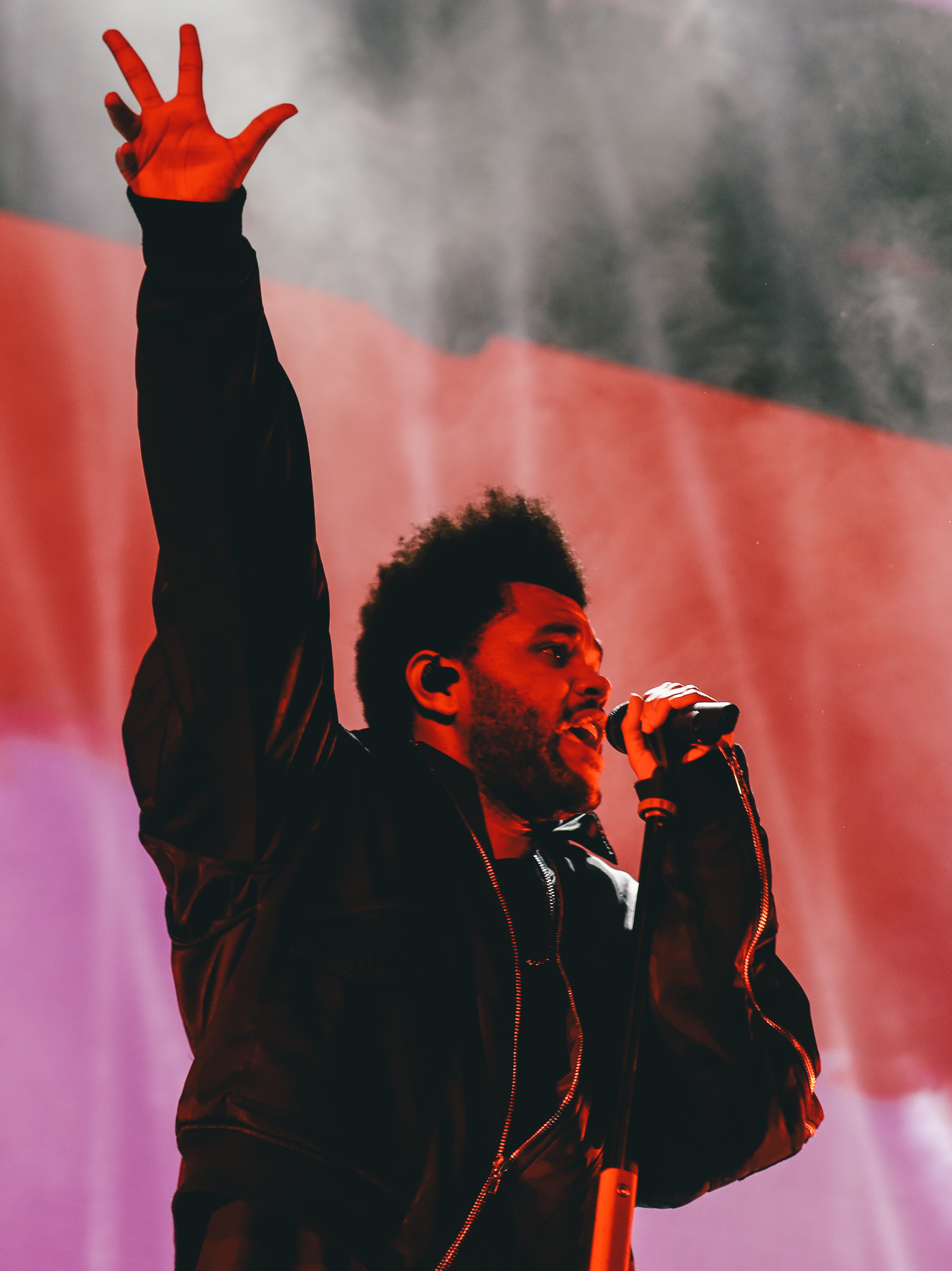
Frank Ocean, the Weeknd (listed clockwise) are considered some of the pioneers of alternative R&B.

Barry Walters of Spin characterizes the unconventional style as an "exchange between EDM, rock, hip hop, and R&B's commercial avant-garde", and cites Kanye West's 808s & Heartbreak, Frank Ocean's Nostalgia, Ultra, and Channel Orange, the Weeknd's 2011 trilogy of mixtapes, Drake's Take Care, Miguel's Kaleidoscope Dream, Holy Other's Held, and How to Dress Well's Total Loss as works associated with alternative R&B. AllMusic's Andy Kellman cites the early albums of Bilal—1st Born Second and Love for Sale—as antecedents to the "left-field R&B" that developed in the late 2000s. According to Jim Farber of the New York Daily News, the Soulquarians collective of the late 1990s and early 2000s, which Bilal was a part of, "corral[ed] leaders of the alternative R&B movement like the Roots and D'Angelo". Janet Jackson's sixth studio album The Velvet Rope (1997) is cited as one of the genre's stylistic origins. Dee Lockett from Slate credits Aaliyah's musical style on her second studio album "One in a Million" for "giving rise to a new subgenre, loosely referred to as experimental R&B (or "PBR&B")". While NPR writer Stasia Irons stated Aaliyah's self-titled album "became a catalyst and bridge that created a smooth transition from '90s style R&B into Modern PBR&B".

Brandon Neasman of The Grio observes a "changing of the guard in R&B, from the smooth, cool heartthrobs to these vulnerable, off-kilter personalities" amid the prevalence of social media in society. Neasman finds the subject matter of "these new-wave artists" to be more "relatable" and writes of alternative R&B's characteristics:

[A] lot of the production is echo-laden and lofty, often using many synthesizers and filtered drums—sonically giving a nod to Prince's vintage '80s sound. Additionally, for the most part, it doesn't feel as if these artists are selling sex as their main entrée. Granted, they still sing about the topic, and in explicit detail, but it's in equal proportion to drugs, spirituality and personal philosophies. You don't get that same diversity in subject matter from the majority of modern R&B singers.

Hermione Hoby of The Guardian writes that "the music is quietly radical" and observes "an ongoing, mutually enriching dialogue between indie and electronic musicians and R&B artists". Gerrick D. Kennedy of the Los Angeles Times feels that "the new movement feels like the most significant stylistic change in R&B since neo soul rolled around in the 1990s".

== Response ==
There are two predominating opinions regarding alternative R&B as a classifier of sonic and lyrical characteristics within the larger R&B genre, the first of the two being a reluctant acceptance of its existence—if only for the sake of marketability.

Stereogum described the genre as a group of "co-conspirators, not a unified movement". Similarly in thought, How to Dress Well, while not offended by the term "PBR&B", finds it "tacky"; in an interview with Complex, he points out that "if you put records [released by other alternative R&B artists] side-by-side, me and whoever, like you're just not going to [hear] the same sounds, period", before proceeding to cite Miguel as an example. Miguel himself has said that he is "comfortable" with the term "indie R&B" because it "insinuates a higher art. Or a deeper or somehow more artistic delivery of rhythm and blues music. It suggests there's more artistry within a genre that has become more of a cliché of itself."

Frank Ocean, when first asked in an interview with The Quietus, whether he considers "Novacane" to be an R&B song, responded, "You're limiting it. And that's why I always say that about the genre thing, because that's what it does. When you say 'it's that', you listen to it in a certain way. And you might not necessarily miss it, but it's just inaccurate, and you'll miss a couple of things, contextually." He proceeds to point out that race and vocal delivery are stereotypical signifiers of R&B music, in turn forcing himself and his peers into a category they may not identify within; when considering Nostalgia, Ultra Ocean argues that if he were a different complexion, "People would listen to it and be like 'Yeah, he borrowed from R&B', but it's just not R&B, it's a lot of things, and you can't just call it 'R&B.'" Ocean also uses alternative R&B for challenging norms in hegemonic masculinity. Channel Orange has prevalent queer-coded lyrics and scenarios within the characters he portrays.

In an interview with The Guardian, FKA Twigs rejected the term by declaring, "Fuck alternative R&B!" She further explained: "It's just because I'm mixed race. When I first released music and no one knew what I looked like, I would read comments like: 'I've never heard anything like this before, it's not in a genre.' And then my picture came out six months later, now she's an R&B singer.'" The Fader echoes her sentiment, stating, "By adding the prefix, it sidelines R&B itself by implying it's not experimental, boundary-pushing or intellectual. It throws side-eye at the genre, while at the same time claiming to have discovered something worthy within it."

== See also ==
- List of alternative R&B artists
- Toronto sound
- Alternative hip hop
- Progressive soul
- African-American music
