= Jerilyn Lee Brandelius =

American writer and photographer (1948–2020)

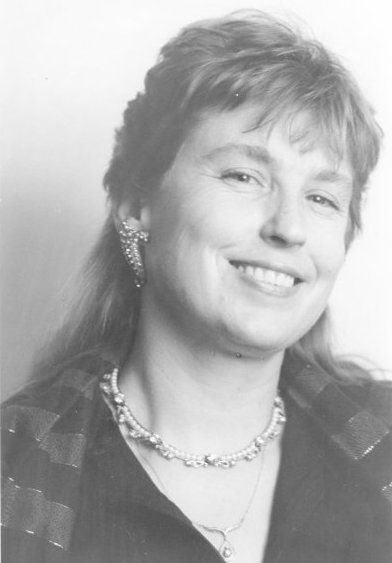
- Born: June 25, 1948; La Jolla, California, U.S.
- Died: August 31, 2020 (aged 72); San Francisco, California, U.S.
- Occupations: Writer, photographer
- Writing career
- Genres: Non-fiction, photojournalism, music
- Notable work: The Grateful Dead Family Album

Jerilyn Lee Brandelius (June 25, 1948 – August 31, 2020) was an American writer and photographer and was known as the author of The Grateful Dead Family Album.

== Early life ==
Brandelius was born in La Jolla, California, the eldest of five children born to Dorothy Anne Reid, a homemaker, and Edwin Carl "Brandy" Brandelius II, a US Marine. Early on, her parents moved to Detroit. Brandelius' paternal grandfather immigrated from Sweden. Her father's second marriage was to singer and environmental activist Katie Lee.

== Career ==
In 1968, Brandelius began working for Translove Airways Productions at the Hippodrome Ballroom in San Diego which led to her meeting members of the Grateful Dead, Steve Miller Band, Quicksilver Messenger Service, The Velvet Underground, Electric Flag, and more. She had a relationship with Grateful Dead drummer Mickey Hart.

In 1969, Brandelius moved to San Francisco, met music promoter and cultural icon Chet Helms (founder of the Avalon Ballroom and father of San Francisco's 1967 Summer of Love). She worked for him as a personal assistant until she went to work for Pete Marino at WEA as a production assistant. Her photographic archive includes rare images from the Grateful Dead's 1978 tour to Egypt.

In 1989, Brandelius published the book The Grateful Dead Family Album with cover art by Stanley Mouse. The book was originally signed to a small publisher but re-signed and pushed into full production with Warner Bros. following Jerry Garcia's hospitalization and near fatal diabetic coma in 1986.

== Television and documentary ==
Brandelius appeared in the 1995 documentary Tie-Died which offers a look at the band and the fans known as "Deadheads". She appeared in American Experience, a television documentary series aired on PBS, in a 2007 episode titled "Summer of Love".
