= The Grateful Dead Family Album =

1989 book by Jerilyn Lee Brandelius

- Author: Jerilyn Lee Brandelius
- Cover artist: Stanley Mouse
- Language: English
- Genre: Reference; Photography; Music
- Publisher: Warner Books
- Publication date: 1989
- Publication place: United States
- Media type: Print
- Pages: 249
- ISBN: 9780446515214

The Grateful Dead Family Album is a photographic music reference book by Jerilyn Lee Brandelius, cover art by Stanley Mouse with hundreds of intimate photographs and stories from members of the Grateful Dead and the Dead Family.

Grateful Dead band members at the time of publication were Jerry Garcia, Bob Weir, Phil Lesh, Mickey Hart, Bill Kreutzmann, and Brent Mydland.

The book was assembled in an office located in downtown San Rafael, California, near the Grateful Dead main offices and ticket box office.
