= Alternative rock =

Music genre

- Other names: Alternative music; alt-rock; alternative
- Stylistic origins: Punk rock; post-punk; new wave; hardcore punk; power pop; jangle pop
- Cultural origins: Late 1970s to early 1980s, United States and United Kingdom
- Derivative forms: Soft grunge

Subgenres
- Britpop; Christian alternative rock; college rock; dream pop; emo; geek rock; grunge; indie rock; math rock; noise pop; nu gaze; post-Britpop; post-grunge; riot grrrl; post-punk revival; post-rock; shoegaze; incelcore

Fusion genres
- Alternative dance; alternative metal (nu metal)

Local scenes
- Ireland; Athens, Georgia; New York City; Illinois; Leeds; Los Angeles; Manchester; Massachusetts; Minneapolis; Portland, Oregon; Seattle, Washington; Arizona

Other topics
- Campus radio; gothic rock; independent music; indie music scene; indie pop; industrial rock; Lollapalooza; noise rock; pop-punk; post-hardcore; progressive rock; ska punk

Alternative rock (also known as alternative music, alt-rock or simply alternative) is a category of rock music that evolved from the independent music underground of the 1970s. Alternative rock acts achieved mainstream success in the 1990s with the likes of the grunge subgenre in the United States, and the Britpop and shoegaze subgenres in the United Kingdom and Ireland. During this period, many record labels were looking for "alternatives", as many corporate rock, hard rock, and glam metal acts from the 1980s were beginning to grow stale throughout the music industry. The emergence of Generation X as a cultural force in the 1980s and 1990s also contributed greatly to the rise of alternative music.

"Alternative" refers to the genre's distinction from mainstream or commercial rock or pop. The term's original meaning was broader, referring to musicians influenced by the musical style or independent, DIY ethos of late-1970s punk rock. Traditionally, alternative rock varied in terms of its sound, social context, and regional roots. Throughout the 1980s, magazines and zines, college radio airplay, and word of mouth had increased the prominence and highlighted the diversity of alternative rock's distinct styles (and music scenes), such as noise pop, indie rock, grunge, and shoegaze. In September 1988, Billboard introduced "alternative" into their charting system to reflect the rise of the format across radio stations in the United States by stations like KROQ-FM in Los Angeles and WDRE-FM in New York, which were playing music from more underground, independent, and non-commercial rock artists.

Initially, several alternative styles achieved minor mainstream notice and a few bands, such as R.E.M. and Jane's Addiction, were signed to major labels. Most alternative bands at the time, like the Smiths, one of the key British alternative rock bands during the 1980s, remained signed to independent labels and received relatively little attention from mainstream radio, television, or newspapers. With the breakthrough of Nirvana and the popularity of the grunge and Britpop movements in the 1990s, alternative rock entered the musical mainstream, and many alternative bands became successful.

Emo found mainstream success in the 2000s with emo-influenced multi-platinum acts such as Fall Out Boy, My Chemical Romance, Paramore and Panic! at the Disco. Bands such as the White Stripes and the Strokes found commercial success in the early 2000s, influencing an influx of new alternative rock bands that drew inspiration from garage rock, post-punk and new wave, establishing a revival of these genres.

== Etymology ==
Record companies usually sign contracts with those entertainers who are thought to become the most popular and generate the most sales. In the past, these bands were able to record their songs in expensive studios, and their works were then offered for sale through record store chains that were owned by the entertainment corporations, along with eventually selling the merchandise into big box retailers. Record companies worked with radio and television companies to get the most exposure for their artists. The people making the decisions were business people dealing with music as a product, and those bands who were not making the expected sales figures were then excluded from this system.

Before the term alternative rock came into common usage around 1990, the sorts of music to which it refers were known by a variety of terms. In 1979, Terry Tolkin used the term alternative to describe the groups he was writing about. In 1979 Dallas radio station KZEW had a late night new wave show entitled "Rock and Roll Alternative". "College rock" was used in the United States to describe the music during the 1980s due to its links to the college radio circuit and the tastes of college students. In the United Kingdom, dozens of small do it yourself record labels emerged as a result of the punk subculture. According to the founder of one of these labels, Cherry Red, NME and Sounds magazines published charts based on small record stores called "Alternative Charts". The first national chart based on distribution called the Indie Chart was published in January 1980; it immediately succeeded in its aim to help these labels. At the time, the term indie was used literally to describe independently distributed records. By 1985, indie had come to mean a particular genre, or group of subgenres, rather than simply distribution status.

The use of the term alternative to describe rock music originated around the mid-1980s; at the time, a music industry term for cutting-edge music was new music. A similar term, alternative pop, emerged around 1985.

In 1987, Spin magazine categorized college rock band Camper Van Beethoven as "alternative/indie", saying that their 1985 song "Where the Hell Is Bill" (from Telephone Free Landslide Victory) "called out the alternative/independent scene and dryly tore it apart." David Lowery, then frontman of Camper Van Beethoven, later recalled: "I remember first seeing that word applied to us... The nearest I could figure is that we seemed like a punk band, but we were playing pop music, so they made up this word alternative for those of us who do that." DJs and promoters during the 1980s claim the term originates from American FM radio of the 1970s, which served as a progressive alternative to top 40 radio formats by featuring longer songs and giving DJs more freedom in song selection. According to one former DJ and promoter, "Somehow this term 'alternative' got rediscovered and heisted by college radio people during the 80s who applied it to new post-punk, indie, or underground-whatever music."

At first the term referred to intentionally non-mainstream rock acts that were not influenced by "heavy metal ballads, rarefied new wave" and "high-energy dance anthems". Usage of the term would broaden to include new wave, pop, punk rock, post-punk, and occasionally "college"/"indie" rock, all found on the American "commercial alternative" radio stations of the time such as Los Angeles' KROQ-FM. Journalist Jim Gerr wrote that alternative also encompassed variants such as "rap, trash, metal and industrial". The bill of the first Lollapalooza, an itinerant festival in North America conceived by Jane's Addiction frontman Perry Farrell, reunited "disparate elements of the alternative rock community" including Henry Rollins, Butthole Surfers, Ice-T, Nine Inch Nails, Siouxsie and the Banshees (as second headliners) and Jane's Addiction (as the headlining act). Covering for MTV the opening date of Lollapalooza in Phoenix in July 1991, Dave Kendall introduced the report saying the festival presented the "most diverse lineups of alternative rock". That summer, Farrell had coined the term Alternative Nation.

In December 1991, Spin magazine noted: "this year, for the first time, it became resoundingly clear that what has formerly been considered alternative rock—a college-centered marketing group with fairly lucrative, if limited, potential—has in fact moved into the mainstream."

In the late 1990s, the definition again became more specific. In 1997, Neil Strauss of The New York Times defined alternative rock as "hard-edged rock distinguished by brittle, '70s-inspired guitar riffing and singers agonizing over their problems until they take on epic proportions."

Defining music as "alternative" is often difficult because the term has two conflicting applications. Alternative can describe music that challenges the status quo and that is "fiercely iconoclastic, anticommercial, and antimainstream", but the term is also used in the music industry to denote "the choices available to consumers via record stores, radio, cable television, and the Internet." However alternative music has paradoxically become just as commercial and marketable as the mainstream rock, with record companies using the term "alternative" to market music to an audience that mainstream rock does not reach. Using a broad definition of the genre, Dave Thompson in his book Alternative Rock cites the formation of the Sex Pistols as well as the release of the albums Horses by Patti Smith and Metal Machine Music by Lou Reed as three key events that gave birth to alternative rock. Additionally, Rhys Wiliams of Loudersound observed, "musical genres collided more in the 90s than in any other decade, making 'alternative' rock ever harder to define." Until the early 2000s, when indie rock became the most common term in the US to describe modern pop and rock, the terms "indie rock" and "alternative rock" were often used interchangeably; while there are aspects which both genres have in common, "indie rock" was regarded as a British-based term, unlike the more American "alternative rock".

== Characteristics ==
The name "alternative rock" essentially serves as an umbrella term for underground music that has emerged in the wake of punk rock since the mid-1980s. Throughout much of its history, alternative rock has been largely defined by its rejection of the commercialism of mainstream culture, although this could be contested since some of the major alternative artists have eventually achieved mainstream success or co-opted with the major labels from the 1990s onward (especially into the 2000s, and beyond). In the 1980s, alternative bands generally played in small clubs, recorded for indie labels, and spread their popularity through word of mouth. As such, there is no set musical style for alternative rock as a whole, although in 1989 The New York Times asserted that the genre is "guitar music first of all, with guitars that blast out power chords, pick out chiming riffs, buzz with fuzztone and squeal in feedback." More often than in other rock styles since the mainstreaming of rock music, alternative rock lyrics tend to address topics of social concern, such as drug use, depression, suicide, and environmentalism. This approach to lyrics developed as a reflection of the social and economic strains in the United States and United Kingdom of the 1980s and early 1990s.

== Precursors (1960s–1970s) ==
Precursors to alternative rock existed in the 1960s with proto-punk. The origins of alternative rock can be traced back to The Velvet Underground & Nico (1967) by the Velvet Underground, which influenced many alternative rock bands that would come after it. Eccentric and quirky figures of the 1960s, such as Syd Barrett have influence on alternative rock in general.

== Origins (1980s) ==
The phrase "alternative rock" generally makes people think of the '90s ... It's never really possible to pinpoint an exact time or place that a genre was born, but for alternative rock–especially the kind that was born out of the American punk underground–1984 might have been the first year ...

— Andrew Sacher of Brooklyn Vegan (April 29, 2024)

Throughout the 1980s, alternative rock remained mainly an underground phenomenon. While on occasion a song would become a commercial hit, or albums would receive critical praise in mainstream publications like Rolling Stone, alternative rock in the 1980s was primarily featured on independent record labels, fanzines and college radio stations. Alternative bands built underground followings by touring constantly and by regularly releasing low-budget albums. In the United States, new bands would form in the wake of previous bands, which created an extensive underground circuit filled with different scenes in various parts of the country. College radio formed an essential part of breaking new alternative music. In the mid-1980s, college station KCPR in San Luis Obispo, California, described in a DJ handbook the tension between popular and "cutting edge" songs as played on "alternative radio".

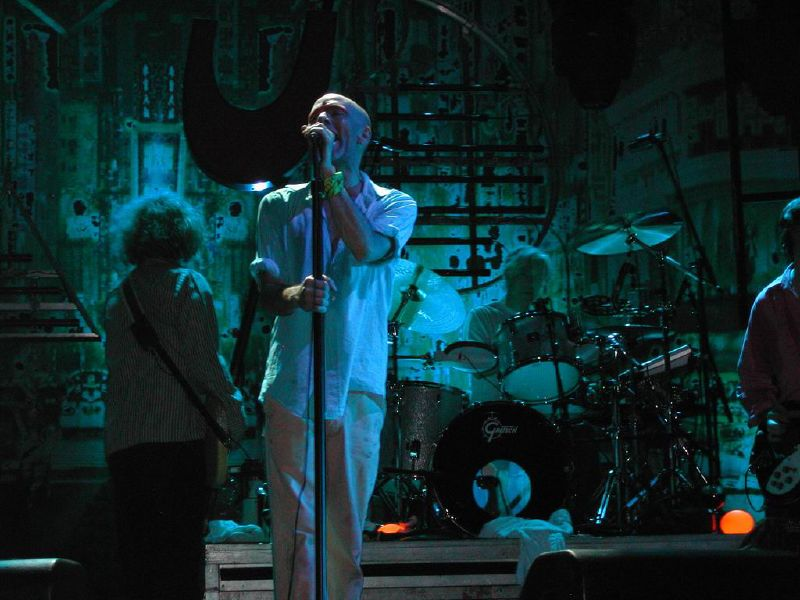
R.E.M., one of the first alternative rock bands, relied on college-radio airplay, constant touring, and a grassroots fanbase to break into the mainstream.

Although American alternative artists of the 1980s never generated spectacular album sales, they exerted a considerable influence on later alternative musicians and laid the groundwork for their success. On September 10, 1988, an Alternative Songs chart was created by Billboard, listing the 40 most-played songs on alternative and modern rock radio stations in the US: the first number one was "Peek-a-Boo" by Siouxsie and the Banshees. By 1989, the genre had become popular enough that a package tour featuring New Order, Public Image Limited and the Sugarcubes toured the US arena circuit.

"Alternative music is music that hasn't yet achieved a mainstream audience ... Alternative music is any kind of music that has the potential to reach a wider audience. It also has real strength, real quality, real excitement, and it has to be socially significant, as opposed to Whitney Houston, which is pablum."

— Mark Josephson, Executive Director of the New Music Seminar speaking in 1988

Early on, British alternative rock was distinguished from that of the US by a more pop-oriented focus (marked by an equal emphasis on albums and singles, as well as greater openness to incorporating elements of dance and club culture) and a lyrical emphasis on specifically British concerns. As a result, few British alternative bands have achieved commercial success in the US. Since the 1980s, alternative rock has been played extensively on the radio in the UK, particularly by disc jockeys such as John Peel (who championed alternative music on BBC Radio 1), Richard Skinner, and Annie Nightingale. Artists with cult followings in the US received greater exposure through British national radio and the weekly music press, and many alternative bands had chart success there.

=== United States in 1980s ===
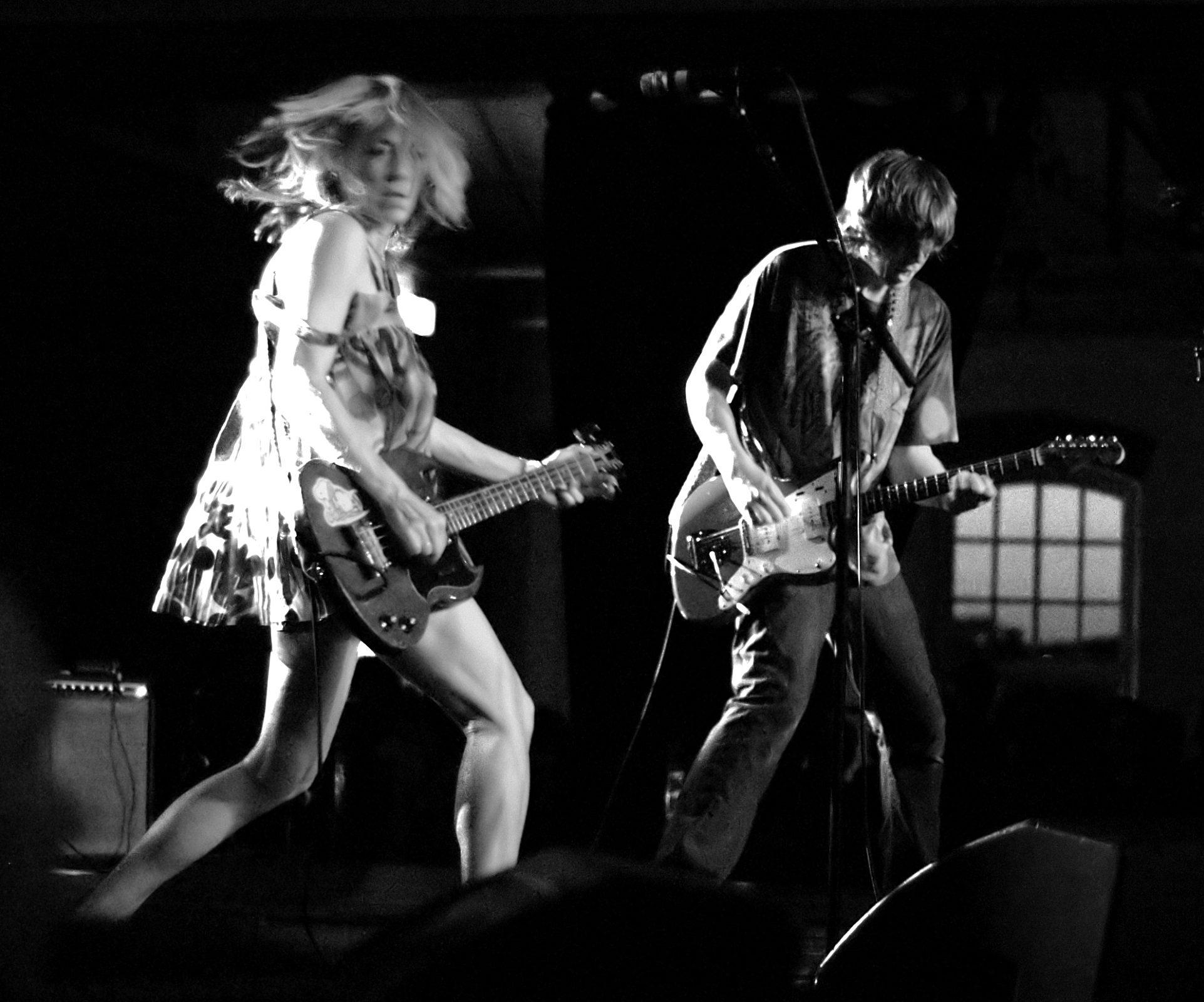
Kim Gordon and Thurston Moore of Sonic Youth performing in July 2005

Early American alternative bands such as the Dream Syndicate, the Bongos, 10,000 Maniacs, R.E.M., the Feelies and Violent Femmes combined punk influences with folk music and mainstream music influences. R.E.M. was the most immediately successful; their debut album, Murmur (1983), entered the Top 40 and spawned a number of jangle pop followers. One of the many jangle pop scenes of the early 1980s, Los Angeles' Paisley Underground revived the sounds of the 1960s, incorporating psychedelia, rich vocal harmonies and the guitar interplay of folk rock as well as punk and underground influences such as the Velvet Underground.

American indie record labels SST Records, Twin/Tone Records, Touch and Go Records, and Dischord Records presided over the shift from the hardcore punk that then dominated the American underground scene to the more diverse styles of alternative rock that were emerging. Minneapolis bands Hüsker Dü and the Replacements were indicative of this shift. Both started out as punk rock bands, but soon diversified their sounds and became more melodic. Michael Azerrad asserted that Hüsker Dü was the key link between hardcore punk and the more melodic, diverse music of college rock that emerged. Azerrad wrote, "Hüsker Dü played a huge role in convincing the underground that melody and punk rock weren't antithetical." The band also set an example by being the first group from the American indie scene to sign to a major record label, which helped establish college rock as "a viable commercial enterprise". By focusing on heartfelt songwriting and wordplay instead of political concerns, the Replacements upended a number of underground scene conventions; Azerrad noted that "along with R.E.M., they were one of the few underground bands that mainstream people liked."

By the late 1980s, the American alternative scene was dominated by styles ranging from quirky alternative rock (They Might Be Giants and Camper Van Beethoven), to noise rock (Sonic Youth, Big Black, the Jesus Lizard) and industrial rock (Ministry, Nine Inch Nails). These sounds were in turn followed by the advent of Boston's Pixies and Los Angeles' Jane's Addiction. Around the same time, the grunge subgenre emerged in Seattle, Washington, initially referred to as "The Seattle Sound" until its rise to popularity in the early 1990s. Grunge featured a sludgy, murky guitar sound that syncretized heavy metal and punk rock. Promoted largely by Seattle indie label Sub Pop, grunge bands were noted for their thrift store fashion which favored flannel shirts and combat boots suited to the local weather. Early grunge bands Soundgarden and Mudhoney found critical acclaim in the U.S. and UK, respectively.

By the end of the decade, a number of alternative bands began to sign to major labels. While early major label signings Hüsker Dü and the Replacements had little success, acts who signed with majors in their wake such as R.E.M. and Jane's Addiction achieved gold and platinum records, setting the stage for alternative's later breakthrough. Some bands such as Pixies had massive success overseas while they were ignored domestically.

In the middle of the decade, Hüsker Dü's album Zen Arcade influenced other hardcore acts by tackling personal issues. Out of Washington, D.C.'s hardcore scene what was called "emocore" or, later, "emo" emerged and was noted for its lyrics which delved into emotional, very personal subject matter (vocalists sometimes cried) and added free association poetry and a confessional tone. Rites of Spring has been described as the first "emo" band. Former Minor Threat singer Ian MacKaye founded Dischord Records which became the center for the city's emo scene.

=== Great Britain in 1980s ===
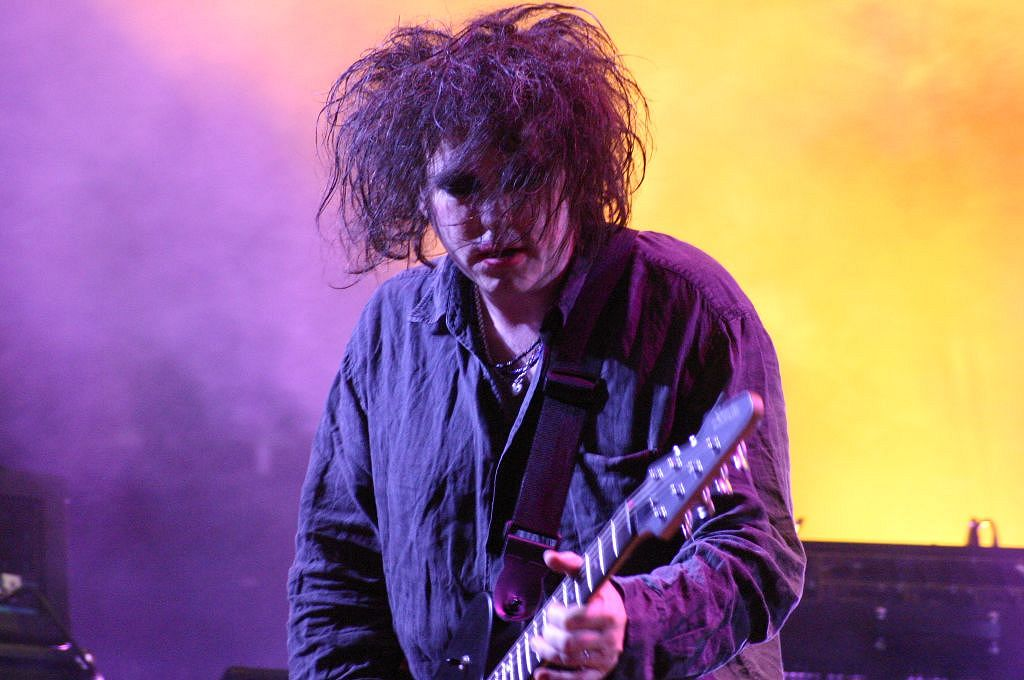
Robert Smith of the Cure performing in June 2004

Gothic rock developed out of late-1970s British post-punk. With a reputation as the "darkest and gloomiest form of underground rock", gothic rock uses a synthesizer-and-guitar based sound drawn from post-punk to construct "foreboding, sorrowful, often epic soundscapes", and the subgenre's lyrics often address literary romanticism, morbidity, religious symbolism, and supernatural mysticism. Bands of this subgenre took inspiration from two British post-punk groups, Siouxsie and the Banshees, and Joy Division. Bauhaus' debut single "Bela Lugosi's Dead", released in 1979, is considered to be the proper beginning of the gothic rock subgenre. The Cure's "oppressively dispirited" albums including Pornography (1982) cemented that group's stature in that style and laid the foundation for its large cult following.

The key British alternative rock band to emerge during the 1980s was Manchester's the Smiths. Music journalist Simon Reynolds singled out the Smiths and their American contemporaries R.E.M. as "the two most important alt-rock bands of the day", commenting that they "were eighties bands only in the sense of being against the eighties". The Smiths exerted an influence over the British indie scene through the end of the decade, as various bands drew from singer Morrissey's English-centered lyrical topics and guitarist Johnny Marr's jangly guitar-playing style. The C86 cassette, a 1986 NME premium featuring Primal Scream, the Wedding Present and others, was a major influence on the development of indie pop and the British indie scene as a whole.

Other forms of alternative rock developed in the UK during the 1980s. the Jesus and Mary Chain's sound combined the Velvet Underground's "melancholy noise" with Beach Boys pop melodies and Phil Spector's "Wall of Sound" production, while New Order emerged from the demise of post-punk band Joy Division and experimented with disco and dance music. The Mary Chain, along with Dinosaur Jr., C86 and the dream pop of Cocteau Twins, were the formative influences for the shoegaze movement of the late 1980s. Named for the band members' tendency to stare at their feet and guitar effects pedals onstage rather than interact with the audience, shoegazing acts like My Bloody Valentine and Slowdive created an overwhelmingly loud "wash of sound" that obscured vocals and melodies with long, droning riffs, distortion, and feedback. Shoegazing bands dominated the British music press at the end of the decade along with the Madchester scene. Performing for the most part in the Haçienda, a nightclub in Manchester owned by New Order and Factory Records, Madchester bands such as Happy Mondays and the Stone Roses mixed acid house dance rhythms with melodic guitar pop.

== Mainstream success (1990s) ==
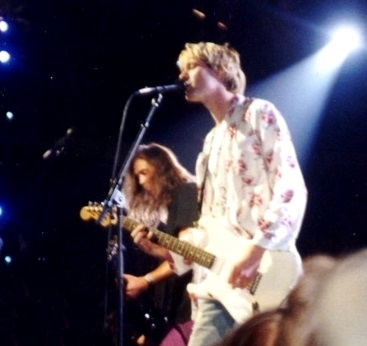
Nirvana's Kurt Cobain (right) and Krist Novoselic (left) performing at the MTV Video Music Awards in 1992

By the start of the 1990s, the music industry was enticed by alternative rock's commercial possibilities and major labels had already signed Jane's Addiction, Red Hot Chili Peppers and Dinosaur Jr. In early 1991, R.E.M. went mainstream worldwide with Out of Time while becoming a blueprint for many alternative bands.

The first edition of the Lollapalooza festival became the most successful tour in North America in July and August 1991. For Dave Grohl of Nirvana who attended the festival at an open-air amphitheater in Southern California, "it felt like something was happening, that was the beginning of it all". The tour helped change the mentalities in the music industry: "by that fall, radio and MTV and music had changed. I really think that if it weren't for Perry [Farrell], if it weren't for Lollapalooza, you and I wouldn't be having this conversation right now".

In the 1990s, a great deal of music which had been considered underground, punk, or just plain weird in the 1980s could suddenly be found in the mainstream; playing on commercial television, on the radio, in shopping centres and sporting arenas. By the decade's end, alternative music was both triumphant and meaningless. ... It had integrated itself completely into the media spectacle, and could no longer reasonably claim to be offering an alternative to it.

— Craig Schuftan of ABC Online (November 13, 2014)

The release of Nirvana's single "Smells Like Teen Spirit" in September 1991 "marked the instigation of the grunge music phenomenon". Helped by constant airplay of the song's music video on MTV, their album Nevermind was selling 400,000 copies a week by Christmas 1991. Its success surprised the music industry. Nevermind not only popularized grunge, but also established "the cultural and commercial viability of alternative rock in general." Michael Azerrad asserted that Nevermind symbolized "a sea-change in rock music" in which the hair metal that had dominated rock music at that time fell out of favor in the face of music that was authentic and culturally relevant.

The Amerindie of the early '80s became known as alternative or alt-rock, ascendant from Nirvana until 1996 or so but currently very unfashionable, never mind that the music is still there.

— Christgau's Consumer Guide: Albums of the '90s (2000)

The breakthrough success of Nirvana led to the widespread popularization of alternative rock in the 1990s. It heralded a "new openness to alternative rock" among commercial radio stations, opening doors for heavier alternative bands in particular.

In the wake of Nevermind, alternative rock "found itself dragged-kicking and screaming ... into the mainstream" and record companies, confused by the genre's success yet eager to capitalize on it, scrambled to sign bands. The New York Times declared in 1993, "Alternative rock doesn't seem so alternative anymore. Every major label has a handful of guitar-driven bands in shapeless shirts and threadbare jeans, bands with bad posture and good riffs who cultivate the oblique and the evasive, who conceal catchy tunes with noise and hide craftsmanship behind nonchalance."

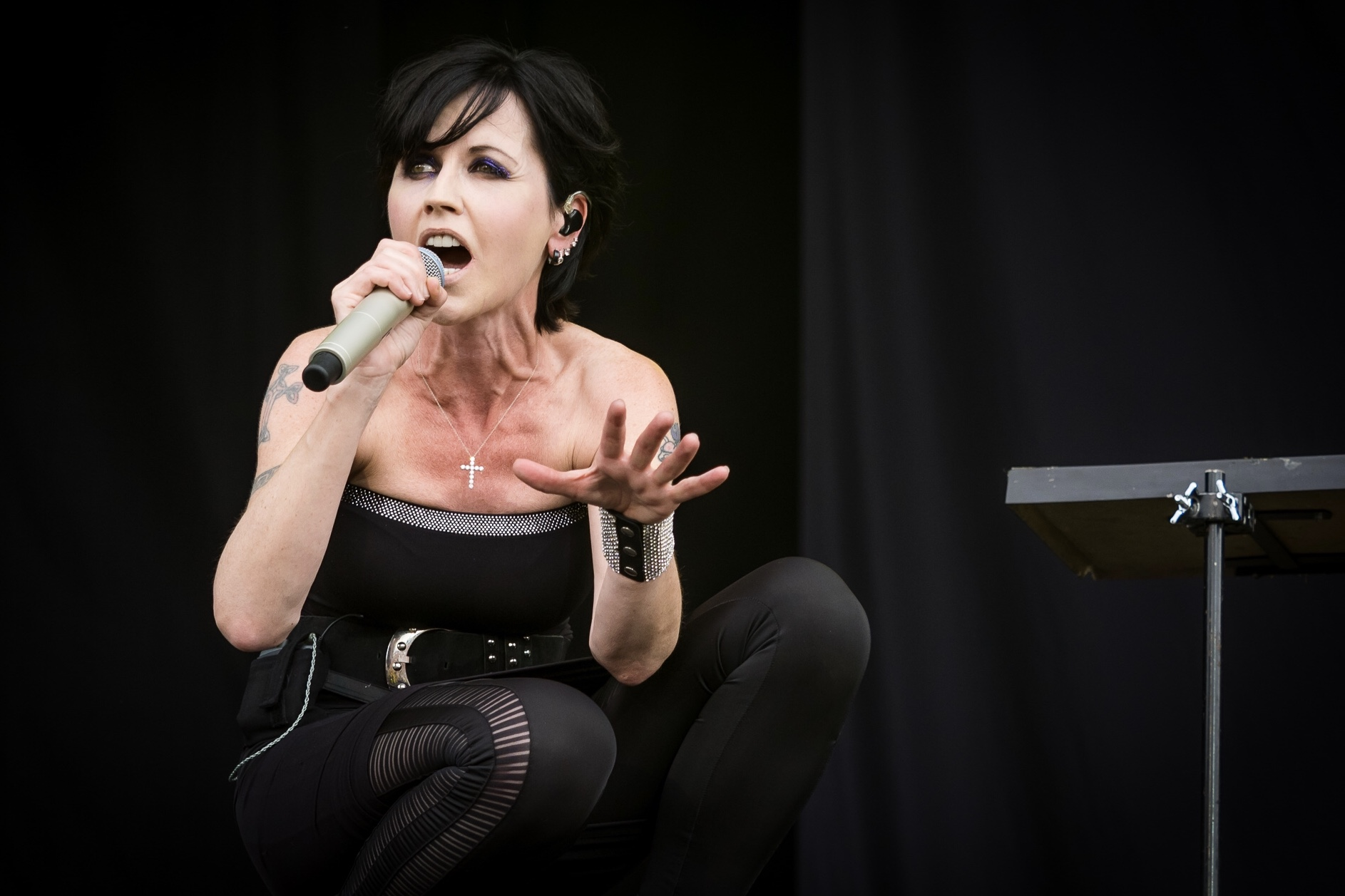
Dolores O'Riordan, lead singer of the Cranberries, performing in 2016

However, many alternative rock artists rejected success, for it conflicted with the rebellious, DIY ethic the genre had espoused before mainstream exposure and their ideas of artistic authenticity. Craig Schuftan of ABC Online assessed, "On the one hand, [alternative rock's entry into the mainstream] gave rise to a resilient and resourceful underground, and on the other, to a hunger for pop justice, for a future world where good music could be popular, and popular music could be good. Thus, when underground music finally broke through to the mainstream in 1991, the event was either denounced as a gigantic sellout or celebrated as a revolution, sometimes both at the same time. It was an intellectual balancing act that could only pulled off with the help of that staple of '90s pop life—postmodern irony."

=== Grunge ===
Other grunge bands subsequently replicated Nirvana's success. Pearl Jam had released its debut album Ten a month before Nevermind in 1991, but album sales only picked up a year later. By the second half of 1992 Ten became a breakthrough success, being certified gold and reaching number two on the Billboard 200 album chart. Soundgarden's album Badmotorfinger, Alice in Chains' Dirt and Stone Temple Pilots' Core along with the Temple of the Dog album collaboration featuring members of Pearl Jam and Soundgarden, were also among the 100 top-selling albums of 1992. The popular breakthrough of these grunge bands prompted Rolling Stone to nickname Seattle "the new Liverpool". Major record labels signed most of the prominent grunge bands in Seattle, while a second influx of bands moved to the city in hopes of success. At the same time, critics asserted that advertising was co-opting elements of grunge and turning it into a fad. Entertainment Weekly commented in a 1993 article, "There hasn't been this kind of exploitation of a subculture since the media discovered hippies in the '60s." The New York Times compared the "grunging of America" to the mass-marketing of punk rock, disco, and hip-hop in previous years. As a result of the genre's popularity, a backlash against grunge developed in Seattle.

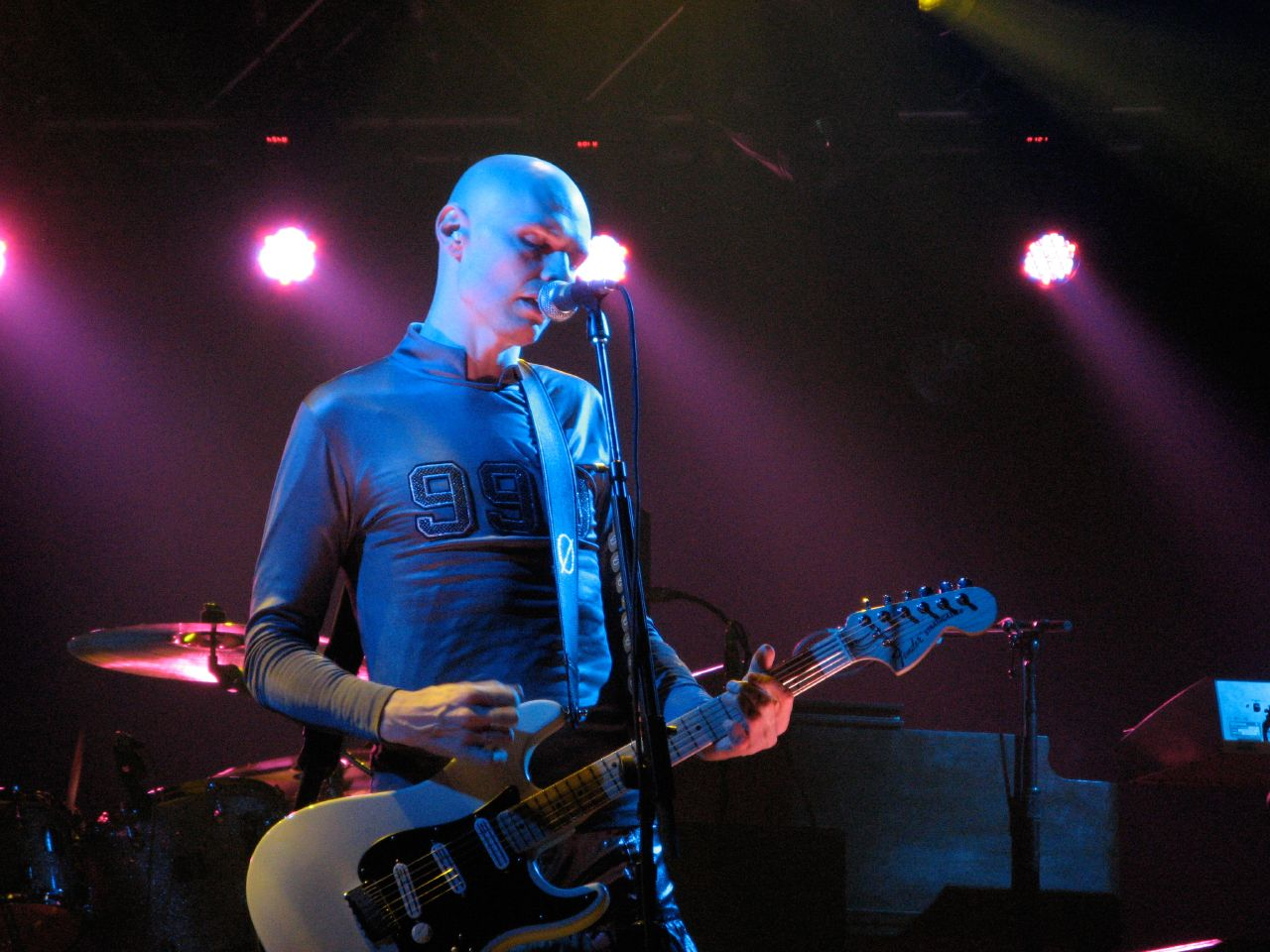
Billy Corgan of the Smashing Pumpkins performing in February 2008

Nirvana's follow-up album In Utero (1993) was an intentionally abrasive album that Nirvana bassist Krist Novoselic described as a "wild aggressive sound, a true alternative record." Nevertheless, upon its release in September 1993 In Utero topped the Billboard charts. Pearl Jam also continued to perform well commercially with its second album, Vs. (1993), which topped the Billboard charts by selling a record 950,378 copies in its first week of release. In 1993, the Smashing Pumpkins released their major breakthrough album, Siamese Dream—which debuted at number 10 on the Billboard 200 and sold over 4 million copies by 1996, receiving multi-platinum certification by the RIAA. The strong influence of heavy metal and progressive rock on the album helped to legitimize alternative rock to mainstream radio programmers and close the gap between alternative rock and the type of rock played on American 1970s Album Oriented Rock radio. In 1995, the band released their double album, Mellon Collie & the Infinite Sadness—which went on to sell 10 million copies in the US alone, certifying it as a Diamond record.

=== Britpop ===
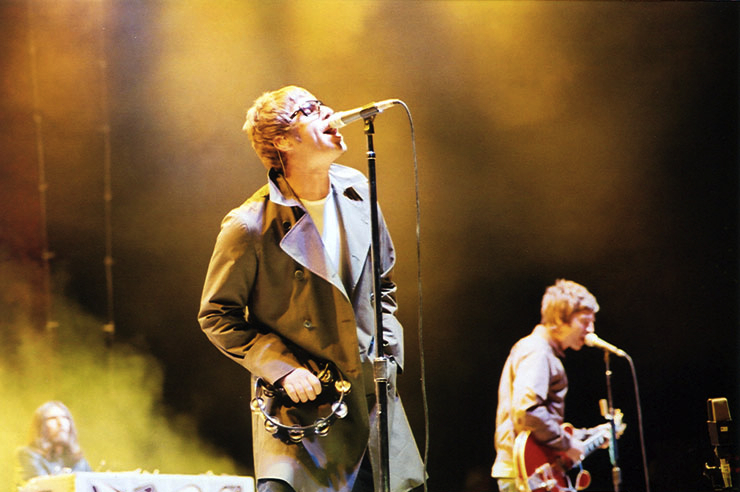
Liam and Noel Gallagher of Oasis performing in September 2005

With the decline of the Madchester scene and the unglamorousness of shoegazing, the tide of grunge from America dominated the British alternative scene and music press in the early 1990s. As a reaction, a flurry of British bands emerged that wished to "get rid of grunge" and "declare war on America", taking the public and native music press by storm. Dubbed "Britpop" by the media, and represented by Oasis, Pulp, Blur and Suede, this movement was the British equivalent of the grunge explosion, in that the artists propelled alternative rock to the top of the charts in their home country.

Britpop bands were influenced by and displayed reverence for British guitar music of the past, particularly movements and genres such as the British Invasion, glam rock, and punk rock. In 1995, the Britpop phenomenon culminated in a rivalry between its two chief groups, Oasis and Blur, symbolized by their release of competing singles "Roll With It" and "Country House" on the same day on 14 August 1995. Blur won "The Battle of Britpop", but they were soon eclipsed in popularity by Oasis, whose second album, (What's the Story) Morning Glory? (1995), went on to become the third best-selling album in the UK's history.

=== Indie rock ===
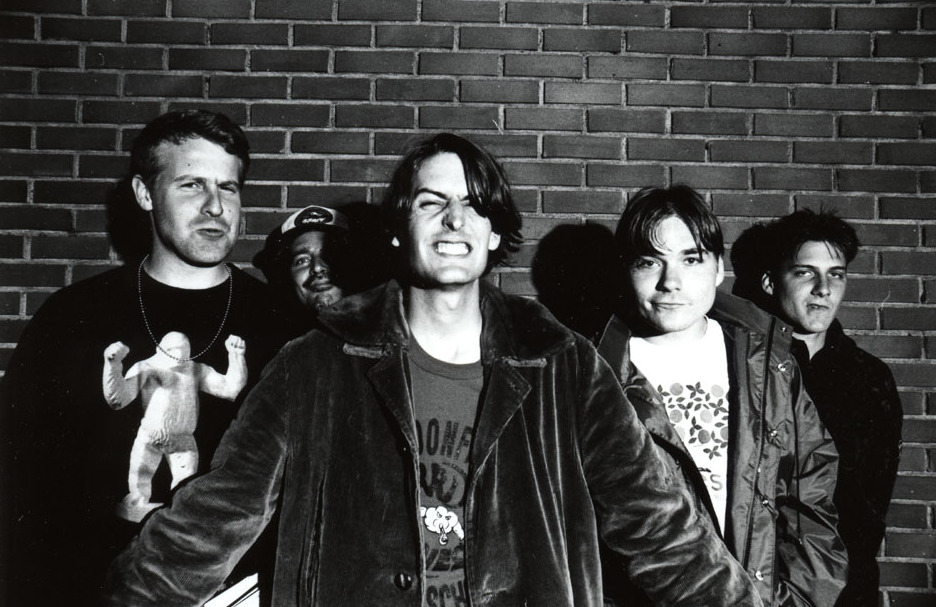
Indie rock band Pavement in 1993

Long synonymous with alternative rock as a whole in the U.S., indie rock became a distinct form following the popular breakthrough of Nirvana. Indie rock was formulated as a rejection of alternative rock's absorption into the mainstream by artists who could not or refused to cross over, and a wariness of its "macho" aesthetic. While indie rock artists share the punk rock distrust of commercialism, the genre does not entirely define itself against that, as "the general assumption is that it's virtually impossible to make indie rock's varying musical approaches compatible with mainstream tastes in the first place".

Labels such as Matador Records, Merge Records, and Dischord, and indie rockers like Pavement, Superchunk, Fugazi, and Sleater-Kinney dominated the American indie scene for most of the 1990s. One of the main indie rock movements of the 1990s was lo-fi. The movement, which focused on the recording and distribution of music on low-quality cassette tapes, initially emerged in the 1980s. By 1992, Pavement, Guided by Voices and Sebadoh became popular lo-fi cult acts in the United States, while subsequently artists like Beck and Liz Phair brought the aesthetic to mainstream audiences. The period also saw alternative confessional female singer-songwriters. Besides the aforementioned Liz Phair, PJ Harvey fit into this sub group.

In the mid-1990s, Sunny Day Real Estate helped the emo genre "break out of obscurity... [and] launched a thousand imitators," who were also inspired by Fugazi and Weezer's 1996 album Pinkerton. These bands include The Promise Ring, The Get Up Kids, and Jimmy Eat World.

=== Lilith Fair ===
Although male artists predominated 1990s rock, female solo artist Alanis Morissette's 1995 album Jagged Little Pill became a multi-platinum hit. In 1997, Canadian musical artist Sarah McLachlan organized the Lilith Fair, a festival that featured female singers and bands such as McLachlan, Paula Cole, Lisa Loeb, and Fiona Apple.

=== Third-wave ska ===
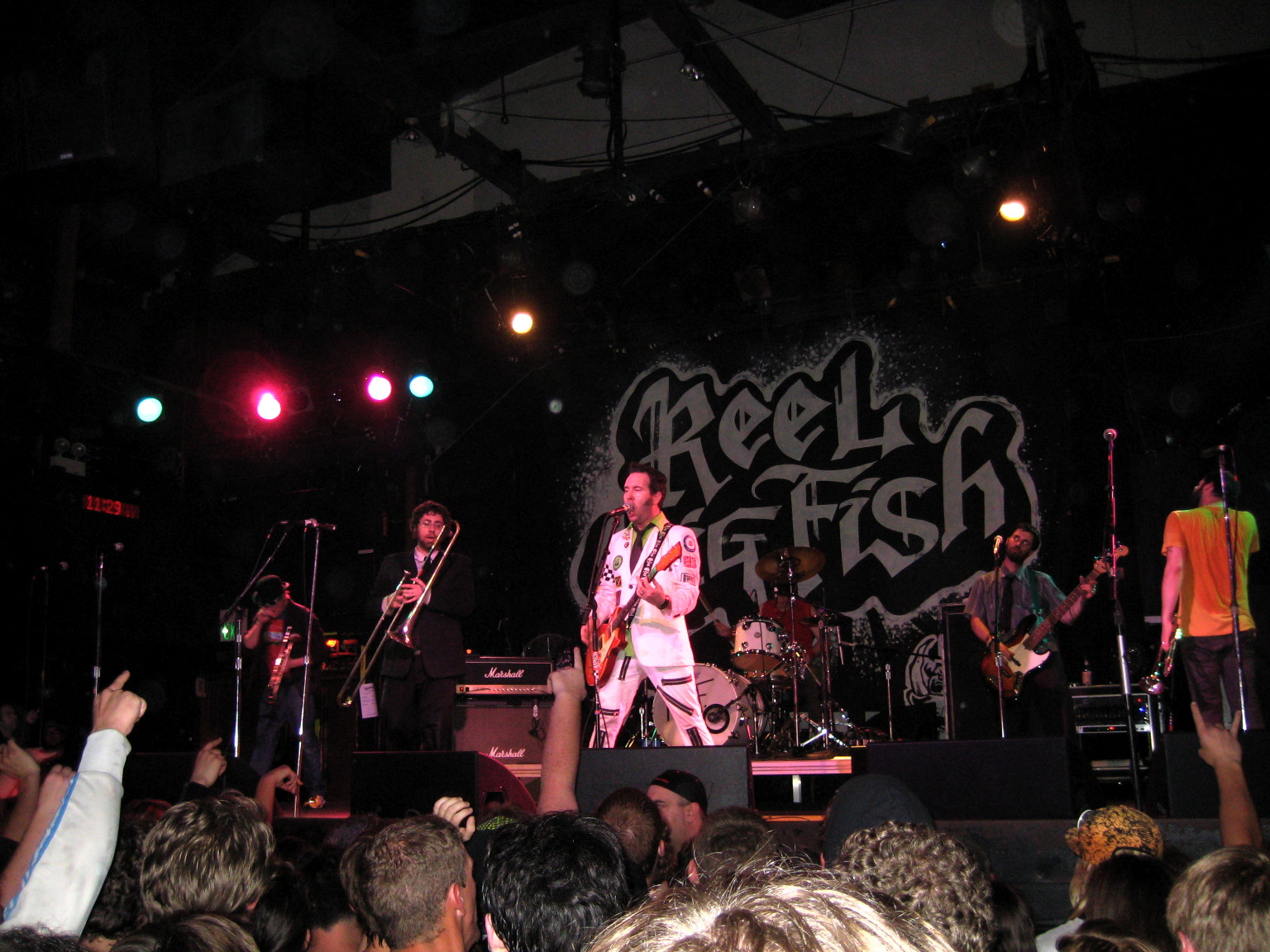
Reel Big Fish performing in 2008

After almost a decade in the underground, ska punk, a mixture of earlier British ska and punk acts, became popular in the United States. Rancid was the first of the "third-wave ska revival" acts to break. From the mid-1990s to early 2000s, the Mighty Mighty Bosstones, No Doubt, Sublime, Goldfinger, Reel Big Fish, Less Than Jake and Save Ferris charted or received radio exposure.

=== Post-rock ===
Post-rock was established by Talk Talk's Laughing Stock and Slint's Spiderland albums, both released in 1991. Post-rock draws influence from a number of genres, including Krautrock, progressive rock, and jazz. The genre subverts or rejects rock conventions, and often incorporates electronic music. While the name of the genre was coined by music journalist Simon Reynolds in 1994 referring to Hex by the London group Bark Psychosis, the style of the genre was solidified by the release of Millions Now Living Will Never Die (1996) by the Chicago group Tortoise. Post-rock was the dominant form of experimental rock music in the 1990s and bands from the genre signed to such labels as Thrill Jockey, Kranky, Drag City, and Too Pure.

A related genre, math rock, peaked in the mid-1990s. In comparison to post-rock, math rock relies on more complex time signatures and intertwining phrases. By the end of the decade a backlash had emerged against post-rock due to its "dispassionate intellectuality" and its perceived increasing predictability, but a new wave of post-rock bands such as Godspeed You! Black Emperor and Sigur Rós emerged who further expanded the genre.

== Diversification (2000s) ==
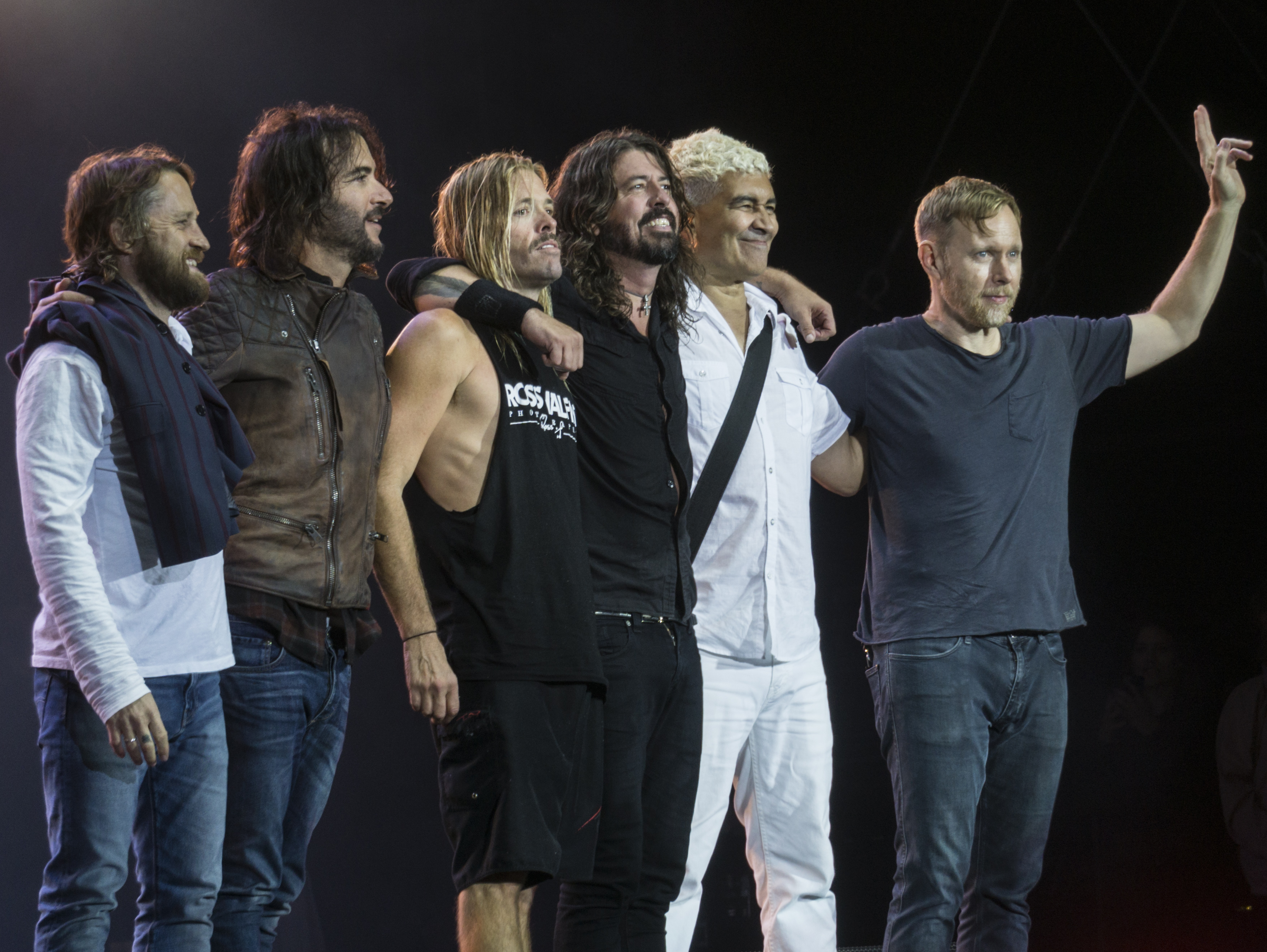
The Foo Fighters became one of the most popular post-grunge acts in the late 1990s and 2000s

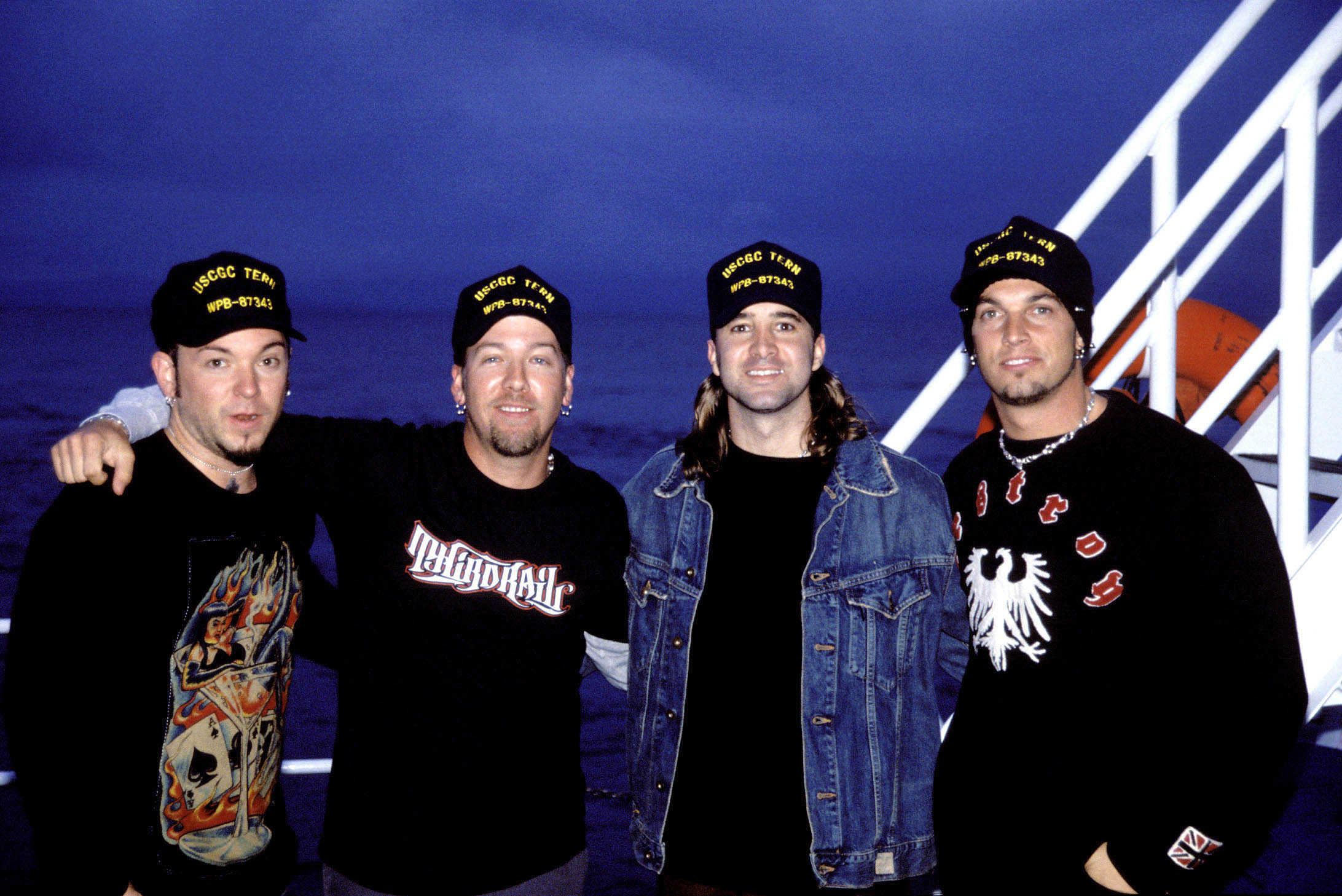
Post-grunge band Creed in November 2002

In the early 21st century, many alternative rock bands that experienced mainstream success struggled following the suicide of Nirvana's Kurt Cobain in April 1994, Pearl Jam's failed lawsuit against concert venue promoter Ticketmaster, Soundgarden's break-up in 1997, the Smashing Pumpkins losing its original members in 2000, L7's hiatus in 2001, the death of Layne Staley and the subsequent disbanding of Alice in Chains in 2002, and the disbanding of both the Cranberries and Stone Temple Pilots in 2003. Britpop also began fading after Oasis' third album, Be Here Now (1997), was met with lackluster reviews.

A signifier of alternative rock's changes was the hiatus of the Lollapalooza festival after an unsuccessful attempt to find a headliner in 1998. In light of the festival's troubles that year, Spin said, "Lollapalooza is as comatose as alternative rock right now". Despite these changes in style however, alternative rock remained commercially viable into the start of the 21st century.

=== Post-grunge ===
During the latter half of the 1990s, grunge was supplanted by post-grunge. Many post-grunge bands lacked the underground roots of grunge and were largely influenced by what grunge had become, namely "a wildly popular form of inward-looking, serious-minded hard rock"; these bands emulated the sound and style of grunge, "but not necessarily the individual idiosyncrasies of its original artists." Post-grunge was a more commercially viable genre that tempered the distorted guitars of grunge with polished, radio-ready production.

Originally, post-grunge was a label used almost pejoratively on bands that emerged when grunge was mainstream and emulated the grunge sound. The label suggested that bands labelled as post-grunge were simply musically derivative, or a cynical response to an "authentic" rock movement. Bush, Candlebox and Collective Soul were labelled almost pejoratively as post-grunge which, according to Tim Grierson of About.com, is "suggesting that rather than being a musical movement in their own right, they were just a calculated, cynical response to a legitimate stylistic shift in rock music." Post-grunge morphed during the late 1990s and 2000s as newer bands such as Foo Fighters, Matchbox Twenty, Creed and Nickelback emerged, becoming among the most popular rock bands in the United States.

=== Post-Britpop ===
At the same time Britpop began to decline, Radiohead achieved critical acclaim with its third album OK Computer (1997), and its follow-ups Kid A (2000) and Amnesiac (2001), which were in marked contrast with the traditionalism of Britpop. Radiohead, along with post-Britpop groups such as Travis and Stereophonics, were major forces in British rock within the subsequent years.

=== Indie rock, post-punk and garage rock revival ===
During the late 1990s and early 2000s, several alternative and indie rock bands emerged, including the Strokes, Franz Ferdinand, Interpol, and the Rapture that drew primary inspiration from post-punk and new wave, establishing the post-punk revival movement. Preceded by the success of bands such as the Strokes and the White Stripes earlier in the decade, an influx of new bands, including several post-punk revival artists and others such as the Killers, and Yeah Yeah Yeahs, found commercial success in the early and mid 2000s.

Owing to the success of these "indie rock revival" bands, Entertainment Weekly declared in 2004, "After almost a decade of domination by rap-rock and nu-metal bands, mainstream alt-rock is finally good again." Arctic Monkeys were a prominent act which owed their initial commercial success to the use of Internet social networking, with two UK No. 1 singles and Whatever People Say I Am, That's What I'm Not (2006), which became the fastest-selling debut album in British chart history. The success of these bands in Britain led to a wave of similar acts dubbed "landfill indie."

=== Emo ===
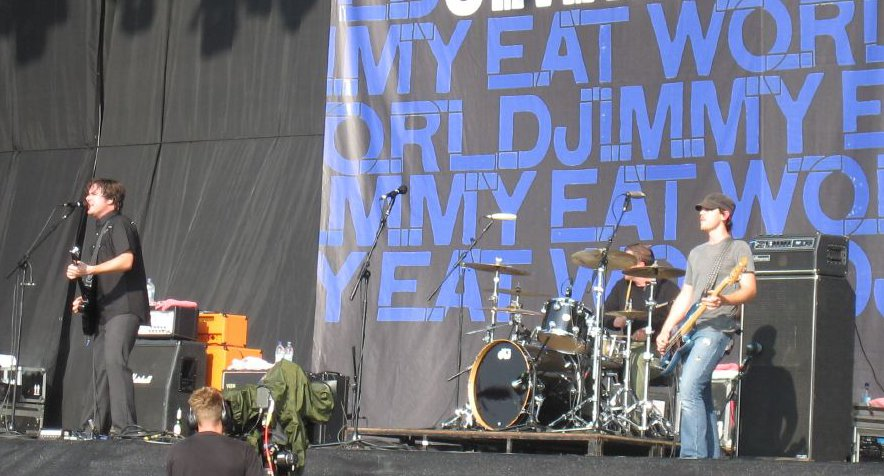
Emo band Jimmy Eat World performing in 2007

By 2000 and on into the new decade, emo was one of the most popular rock music genres. Popular acts included the sales success of Bleed American by Jimmy Eat World (2001) and Dashboard Confessional's The Places You Have Come to Fear the Most (2003). The new emo had a much more mainstream sound than in the 1990s and a far greater appeal among adolescents than its earlier incarnations. At the same time, the use of the term "emo" expanded beyond the musical genre, becoming associated with fashion, a hairstyle and any music that expressed emotion. Emo's mainstream success continued with bands emerging in the 2000s, including multi-platinum acts such as Fall Out Boy and My Chemical Romance and mainstream groups such as Paramore and Panic! at the Disco.

=== Other trends ===
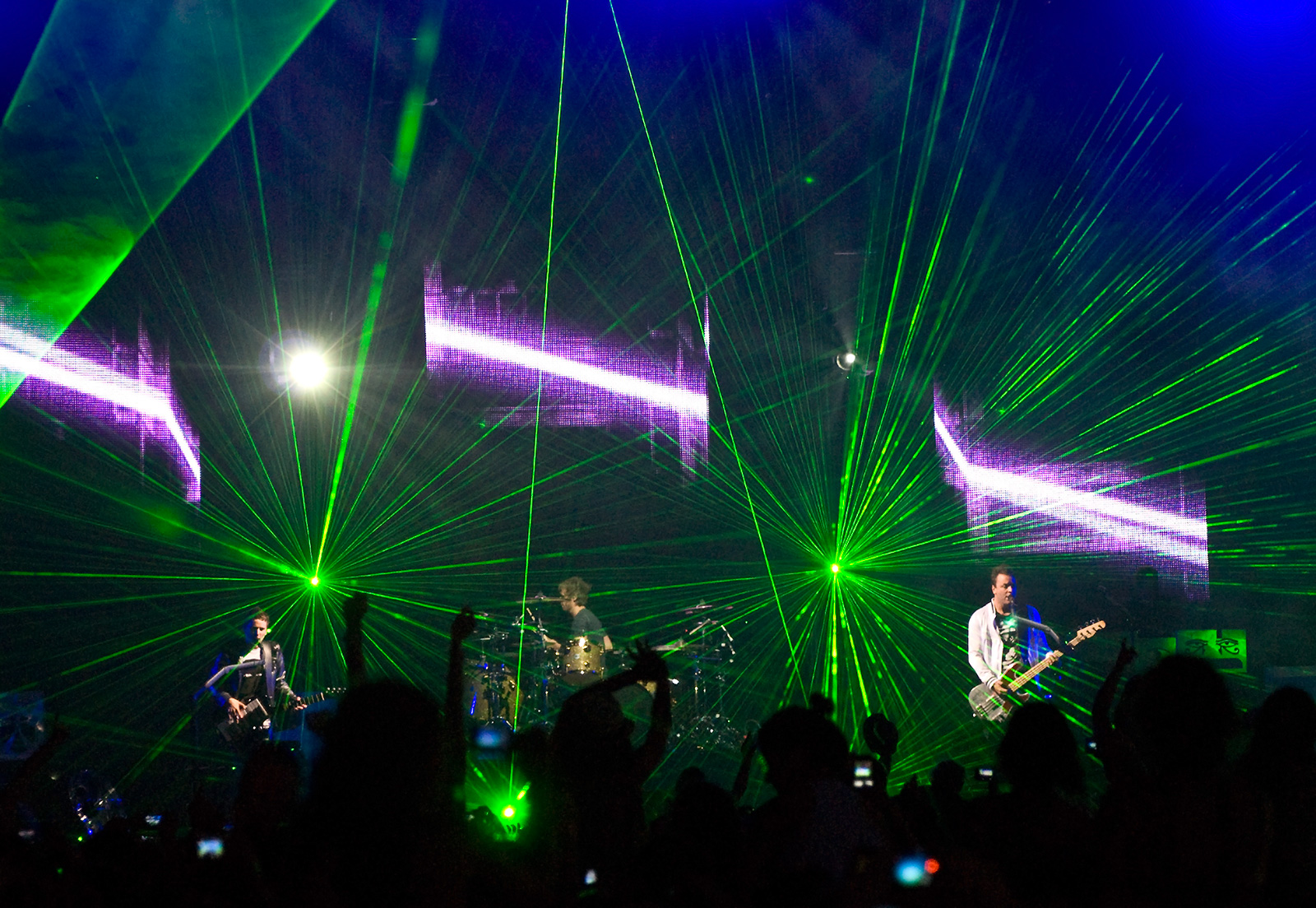
Muse performing in Melbourne, Australia, in January 2010

American rock band Red Hot Chili Peppers entered a new-found popularity in 1999 after the release of their album Californication (1999), with continued success throughout the 2000s. Thirty Seconds to Mars experienced a notable rise in popularity during the latter half of the 2000s.

== 2010–present ==
Most references to alternative rock music in the United States in the 2010s are to the indie rock genre, a term that previously had limited usage on alternative rock channels and media. Some radio stations in the 2010s had changed formats outside of alternative rock music, but this is mostly motivated by conglomeration efforts coupled with advertisers seeking more Top 40/Top 100 stations for sales. While there have been conflicting opinions on the relevance of alternative rock to mainstream audiences beyond 2010, Dave Grohl commented on an article from the New York Daily News about the 2013 MTV Video Music Awards in August 2013, stating that rock is dead: "speak for yourself... rock seems pretty alive to me."

=== Trends of the 2010s ===
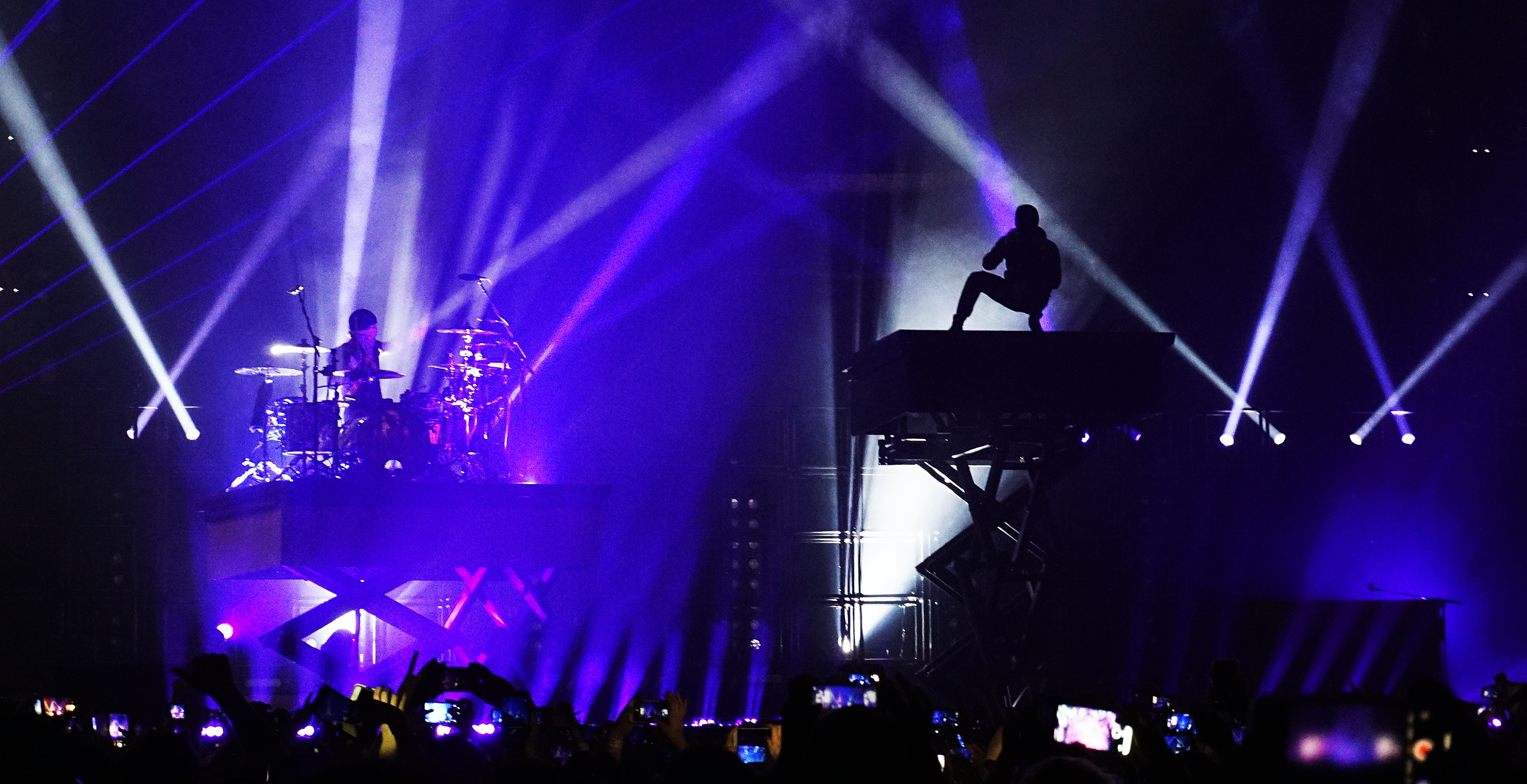
Twenty One Pilots performing at Resorts World Arena in Birmingham, 2019

Contemporary mainstream alternative rock bands tend to fuse musical elements of hard rock, electronica, hip-hop, indie, and punk while placing emphasis on keyboards and guitar. In the 2010s, British rock band Muse gained a worldwide recognition with their album The Resistance and Drones which won Grammy Awards.

American alternative duo Twenty One Pilots blurs between the lines of multiple genres including hip-hop, emo, rock, indie pop and reggae and has managed to break numerous records. They became the first alternative act to have two concurrent top five singles in the United States while their fourth studio album Blurryface (2015) was the first album in history to have every song receive at least a Gold certification from the Recording Industry Association of America. Twenty One Pilots also became the first rock act to have a song reach a billion streams on Spotify. Their breakout hit single "Stressed Out" was the twenty-fifth song to achieve the rare feat of at least one billion plays on the streaming platform. The milestone comes at a time when music genres represented on streaming platforms like Spotify are fairly homogeneous, being dominated by genres such as hip-hop, EDM, and adult contemporary-styled pop.

=== Alternative pop ===
Canadian singer Avril Lavigne's success in the early 2000s, including her hit single "Sk8er Boi", helped set the stage for a subsequent generation of female alt-pop singers. In the late 2000s, American singer Santigold established herself as an "alternative pop hero" due to her apparent artistic conviction.

In the early 2010s, American singer Lana Del Rey developed a "cult-like following" with her "cinematic, beat-heavy alt-pop", which was characterized by an "alluring sadness and melodrama". New Zealand alt-pop singer Lorde achieved global success in 2013 and 2014, topping charts and winning awards. In 2022, American singer Billie Eilish was credited with marking the "ascendence" of alternative pop in the mainstream with her dark, downbeat pop.

=== Alternative R&B ===
A stylistic alternative to contemporary R&B that began in the mid 2000s and came to prominence with musical artists such as Frank Ocean, Khalid, SZA, Summer Walker, Jhené Aiko, Brent Faiyaz, Zayn Malik, Tyler, The Creator, Steve Lacy, Childish Gambino, Miguel, Drake, The Weeknd, Kehlani, Tinashe, Bryson Tiller, PartyNextDoor, Tory Lanez, 6lack, and others. It is considered to be "more progressive and diverse" than its mainstream counterpart.

The Weeknd being a prime example of the genre has gained mainstream success with his second studio album Beauty Behind the Madness and his third studio album Starboy and has been considered a staple of alt-R&B.

== See also ==
- List of alternative rock artists
- Spin Alternative Record Guide

Radio formats

- Adult album alternative
- Classic alternative
- Modern rock

== Bibliography ==
- Azerrad, Michael (1994). Come As You Are: The Story of Nirvana. Doubleday. ISBN 978-0-385-47199-2.
- Azerrad, Michael (2001). Our Band Could Be Your Life: Scenes from the American Indie Underground, 1981–1991. Little Brown and Company. ISBN 978-0-316-78753-6.
- Blashill, Pat (1996). Noise From The Underground: A Secret History of Alternative Rock. Simon & Schuster. ISBN 978-0-684-81513-8.
- Bogdanov, V.; Woodstra, C.; Erlewine, S. T. (2002). All Music Guide to Rock: the Definitive Guide to Rock, Pop, and Soul (3rd ed.). Milwaukee, Wisconsin: Backbeat Books. ISBN 0-87930-653-X.
- Erlewine, Stephen Thomas. "American Alternative Rock/Post-Punk". AllMusic. Retrieved May 20, 2006.
- Erlewine, Stephen Thomas. "British Alternative Rock". AllMusic. Retrieved May 20, 2006.
- Harris, John (2004). Britpop!: Cool Britannia and the Spectacular Demise of English Rock. Da Capo Press. ISBN 978-0-306-81367-2.
- Lyons, James (2004). Selling Seattle: Representing Contemporary Urban America. Wallflower. ISBN 978-1-903364-96-3.
- Reynolds, Simon (2006). Rip It Up and Start Again: Postpunk 1978–1984. Faber and Faber. ISBN 978-0-14-303672-2.
