= Bud & Travis =

American folk music duo, Bud Dashiell and Travis Edmonson

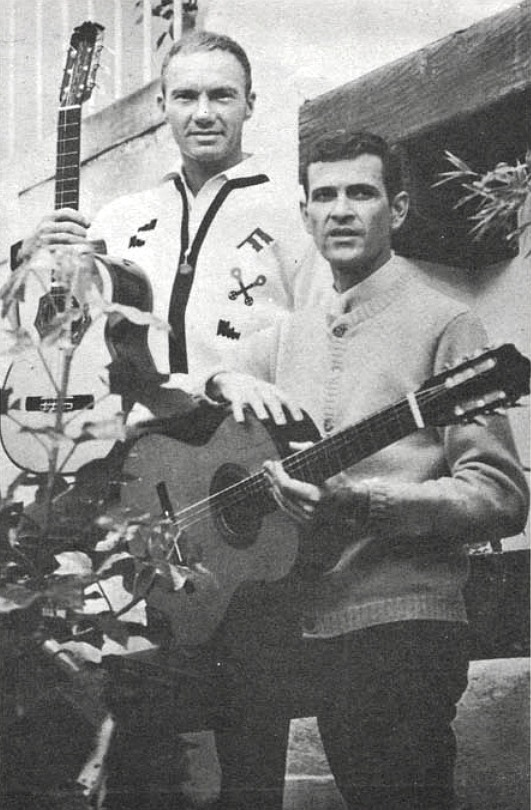

Background information
- Origin: San Francisco, California, U.S.
- Genres: Contemporary folk music
- Years active: 1958–1965
- Labels: Liberty, Folk Era
- Past members: Bud Dashiell; Travis Edmonson

Bud & Travis was an American folk music duo from San Francisco, California, consisting of Bud Dashiell and Travis Edmonson that collaborated from 1958 to 1965.

== History ==
Bud & Travis began recording together in 1958; Edmonson was related to Colin Edmonson, whom Dashiell had met while serving in the Korean War. Travis Edmonson had previously been a member of the Gateway Singers. They released multiple singles and albums and toured widely before splitting in 1965, becoming significant musicians on the folk revival circuit.

Bud & Travis appeared as the musical act the "coffee house duo" in the 1959 episode of "The M Squad" entitled "The Fire Makers".

Edmonson and Dashiell reportedly had frequent clashes, and the duo separated from 1960 to 1963. During this period Dashiell issued several records with The Kinsmen, and Edmonson put out several solo albums. Dashiell went solo after their final breakup in 1965, releasing an album in 1968. He taught late in life, and died in 1989 as a result of a brain tumor. Edmonson toured regularly in the 1970s as a solo act. He died on May 9, 2009.

== Discography ==
Singles

Bud & Travis

- "Mexican Wedding Dance (La Bamba)" / "Raspberries, Strawberries (Le Chanson De La Framboise)" (World Pacific X-801, 1958)
- "Bonsoir Dame (Good Night My Lady Love)" / "Truly Do" (Liberty 55202, 1959)
- "Poor Boy" / "Jenny On A Horse" (Liberty 55221, 1959)
- "Cloudy Summer Afternoon" / "E La Bas" (Liberty 55235, 1960)
- "Come To The Dance (Vamos Al Baile)" / "Carmen Carmelia" (Liberty 55259, 1960)
- "Ballad Of The Alamo" / "The Green Leaves of Summer" (Liberty 55284, 1960), #64
- "Tomorrow Is A Long Time" / "Haiti" (Liberty 55612, 1963)
- "Maria Cristina" / "Sabras Que Te Quiero" (Liberty 55681, 1964)
- "How Long, How Long Blues" / "Gimme Some" (Liberty 55713, 1964)
- "I Talk To The Trees" / "A Moment In The Sun" (Liberty 55764, 1965)
- "Cold Summer" / "Girl Sittin‘ Up In A Tree" (Liberty 55803, 1965)

Bud Dashiell and the Kinsmen

- "Pom Pa Lom" / "I Talk To The Trees" (Warner Bros. 5231, 1961)
- "In Tarrytown" / "Big Manuel" (Warner Bros. 5276, 1962)

Bud Dashiell

- "I Think It's Gonna Rain Today" / "Seasons In The Sun" (Warner Bros. 7157, 1968)

Travis Edmonson

- "The Web" / "Cuanta La Mera (Guantanamera)" (Reprise 20,071, 1962)

Albums

Bud & Travis

- Bud & Travis (Liberty LRP-3125/LST-7125, 1959)
- Spotlight on Bud & Travis (Liberty LRP-3138/LST-7138, 1960)
- Bud & Travis...In Concert (Liberty LDM-11001/LDS-12001, 1960) U.S. #126
- Bud & Travis In Concert, Volume 2 (Liberty LRP-3222/LST-7222, 1960)
- Naturally (Liberty LRP-3295/LST-7295, 1963)
- Perspective on Bud & Travis (Liberty LRP-3295/LST-7341, 1964) U.S. #129
- In Person (Liberty LRP-3386/LST-7386, 1964); recorded live at The Cellar Door
- The Bud & Travis Latin Album (Liberty LRP-3398/LST-7398, 1965); reissued on Folk Era 1471 in 2004
- Bud & Travis (Sunset SUM 1154/SUS 5154, 1968); compilation album
- Cloudy Summer Afternoon (Liberty LN 10213, 1984); compilation album
- The Best of Bud & Travis (Collectors' Choice Music CCM-065-2, 1996); compilation album
- The Santa Monica Concert (Folk Era 1465, 2003); includes tracks from In Concert and In Concert, Volume 2
- From the Ridiculous to the Sublime (Travis Edmonson Collection #21, 2008); compilation album

Bud Dashiell and the Kinsmen

- Folk Music in a Contemporary Manner (Warner W/WS-1429, 1961); with Carson Parks and Bernie Armstrong (formerly The Steeltown Two); reissued on CD in 2010 on Tartare TTR 80012
- Sing Everybody's Hits (Warner Bros. W/WS-1432, 1962); with Bernie Armstrong and Everit Herter; recorded live at Glendale College

Bud Dashiell

- I Think It's Gonna Rain Today (Warner Bros. W/WS-1731, 1968)

Travis Edmonson

- Travis on Cue (Horizon WP-1606, 1962); recorded live at The Troubadour
- Travis on His Own (Reprise R9-6035, 1963); reissued in 1965 minus three cuts on Tradition TR-2074 as Travelin' with Travis
- The Liar's Hour (Latigo 32286, 1975); with Bill Moore
- Ten Thousand Goddam Cattle (Katydid 10076, 1977); with Katie Lee, Earl Edmonson, and David Holt
- The Tucson Tapes: The First Set (Folk Era 1460, 2001); recorded in 1966
- The Tucson Tapes: The Second Set (Folk Era 1461, 2001); recorded in 1966
- Live @ UC Santa Barbara 5/9/66 (Folk Era 1466, 2002); recorded in 1966
- Let's All Room Together Next Semester! - The Travis Edmonson Diamond Jubilee Anthology (2007)
- Viva Travis! - The Travis Edmonson Diamond Jubilee Anthology (2007); Spanish tracks from the Latin Album and others

Soundtracks

Bud & Travis

- Theme song for ABC television series Stagecoach West (1960–1961)

Appearances

Bud & Travis

- Saturday Night at the Coffee House (World Pacific WP-1254, 1958); also released as A Night at the Ash Grove; "La Bamba" and "Johnny, I Hardly Knew Ye"
- This Is Stereo (Liberty LST-101, 1960); "Raspberries, Strawberries"
- The Greatest Stars of Folk Music (Legacy 385, 1960); "La Bamba"
- Swingin' Like '60!, Volume 2 (World Pacific WP-1290, 1960); "La Bamba"
- Hootenanny (Crestview CRV-806, 1963); "La Bamba"
- Hootenanny Saturday Nite! (World Pacific WP-1813, 1964); "Raspberries, Strawberries" and "La Bamba"
- Liberty Hootenanny (Liberty L-5506, 1965); "Down in the Valley" and "Ah, Nora, War Is Over"
- Folksong Festival (Capitol/EMI 57218, 1989); "Ballad of the Alamo", "Guantanamera", and "Two Brothers"
- Folk Song America: A 20th Century Revival (Smithsonian Collection/Sony Music Special Products, 1991); "Delia's Gone"
- Time-Life's Treasury of Folk Music: An All-Star Hootenanny (Capitol/EMI, 1996); "Sloop John B"
- Washington Square Memoirs: The Great Urban Folk Boom 1950-1970 (Rhino 74264, 2001); "Raspberries, Strawberries"

Bud Dashiell and the Kinsmen

- Hoot Tonight! (Warner Bros. W/WS-1512, 1963); "Wars Of Germany"

Travis Edmonson

- Puttin' On The Style (Decca DL 8413, 1957); as a member of The Gateway Singers
- The Gateway Singers at the hungry i (Decca DL 8671, 1958); as a member of The Gateway Singers
- Hootenanny At The Troubadour (Horizon WP-1616, 1963); "E La Bas"
- Hollywood Hootenanny (Horizon WP-1631, 1964); "The Things I've Saved"
