= Caterwaul (band) =

American rock band

- Caterwaul's landmark 1987 video for "A Flower and a Stone"

Background information
- Origin: Phoenix, Arizona, United States
- Genres: Rock, alternative rock, indie rock, college rock, post-rock
- Years active: 1987–1991
- Labels: I.R.S. Lost Arts Records
- Past members: Betsy Martin (vocals, mandolin) 1987–1991; Mark Schafer (guitar) 1987–1991; Fred Cross (bass) 1987–1990; Kelly Castro (bass) 1991; Stuart Smith (guitar) 1991
- Website: Caterwaul

Caterwaul was an American band, formed in 1987 in Phoenix, Arizona, featuring Betsy Martin on vocals and mandolin, Mark Schafer on guitar, Fred Cross on bass and Kevin Pinnt on the drums.

The LA Times compared their "tense, vibrant sound" to other bands with frontwomen such as Siouxsie and the Banshees and the Cocteau Twins. Critic Steve Hochman described their style as "noisy, arty rock". They were signed to indie label I.R.S.

== History ==
Singer Betsy Martin said that their influences were wide, citing "her own fondness for American "hillbilly" folk" and drummer Kevin Pinnt's interest for industrial noise music. She stated about their first albums: "there's a pull between aggressiveness and trying to keep innocence in our music".

Their debut album, The Nature of Things (1987) was released on Lost Arts Records. it included the single "A Flower and a Stone". Later in 1988, Caterwaul was signed by I.R.S. and they released an EP and several albums for the label; Beholden in 1988 and Pin and Web in 1989.

When reviewing Pin and Web, Trouser press linked them to early R.E.M., writing that it was "clear, carefully crafted music". The single "The Sheep's A Wolf" taken from Pin and Web, received airplay on Alternative rock radio stations in the US.

Portent Hue was released in 1990. Fred Cross left the band after the Portent Hue tour, and they recruited Kelly Castro as their new bassist. They also added Stuart Smith as a second guitarist. The new lineup recorded Killer Fish in 1991, which was released in 1996 on Lost Arts Records.

== Discography ==
- The Nature of Things (Lost Arts Records, 1987)
- Scream: The Compilation (Geffen Records, 1987)
- Beholden (I.R.S. Records, 1988)
- Pin and Web (I.R.S. Records, 1989)
- Portent Hue (I.R.S. Records, 1990)
- Killer Fish (Lost Arts Records, 1996)
