= Portent Hue =

Studio album by Caterwaul
- Released: 1990
- Genre: Hard rock
- Label: I.R.S.
- Producer: Dave Ogilvie, Greg Reely

Caterwaul chronology
Pin and Web (1989)	Portent Hue (1990)	Killer Fish (1996)

Portent Hue is the fourth album by the American band Caterwaul, released in 1990. Its title comes from a line in the song "Big Ox Laughing". Caterwaul supported the album with North American and UK tours, during which bass player Fred Cross left the band.

== Production ==
The album was recorded over two months in Vancouver, Canada, and was produced by Dave Ogilvie and Greg Reely. The members of Caterwaul would work on music on their own before jamming together, and readied most of the songs during a tour for their previous album, Pin and Web. Frontwoman Betsy Martin often waited until right before a track was to be recorded to write her lyrics. "Small Things in Heaven" is a solo piece for Martin, with just her voice and mandolin. "Alex' Aphrodisiac" was inspired by the novel A Clockwork Orange.

== Critical reception ==
Professional ratings
Review scores
Source	Rating
Alternative Rock	4/10
Chicago Tribune	3/4 stars
Knoxville News Sentinel	4.5/5 stars
Los Angeles Times	2.5/5 stars

The St. Petersburg Times said that "Martin has an eerie, memorable voice and a forceful way with words, making her otherwise routine hard rock tunes special but not spectacular." The Los Angeles Times stated that she "has a rangy voice that can move with sure pitch and control from a cracked, cronelike husk to a disembodied Appalachian falsetto." The Chicago Tribune noted that "listeners will hear snatches of late-'70s Public Image Ltd., the dense, moody soundscapes of early R.E.M., and the predatory power of Siouxsie and the Banshees."

The Indianapolis Star opined that "most of Mark Schafer's cranked-up guitar parts are catchy". The Knoxville News Sentinel praised the "vivid rock songs of fiery intensity"; it later listed Portent Hue as the fourth best album of 1990. The Courier Journal said that Caterwaul's "vocal and instrumental strengths come to a chilling, hard-edged focus." Trouser Press stated, "The dramatic, full-blooded rock ... of Portent Hue matches Martin's inventive vocals strength for strength, cutting an uneven path but scoring points along the way."

== Track listing ==
No.	Title	Length
1.	"Innerlooped"
2.	"Alex' Aphrodisiac"
3.	"Maybe in a Million Years"
4.	"Husky Beatha"
5.	"Good for You"
6.	"Small Things in Heaven"
7.	"Stumped"
8.	"You'll Awaken"
9.	"Manna and Quail"
10.	"Big Ox Laughing"
11.	"Seven Rabbits"
12.	"Bulldosage"
13.	"This Regret"
14.	"Fissure"
