= Bob Log III =

American musician

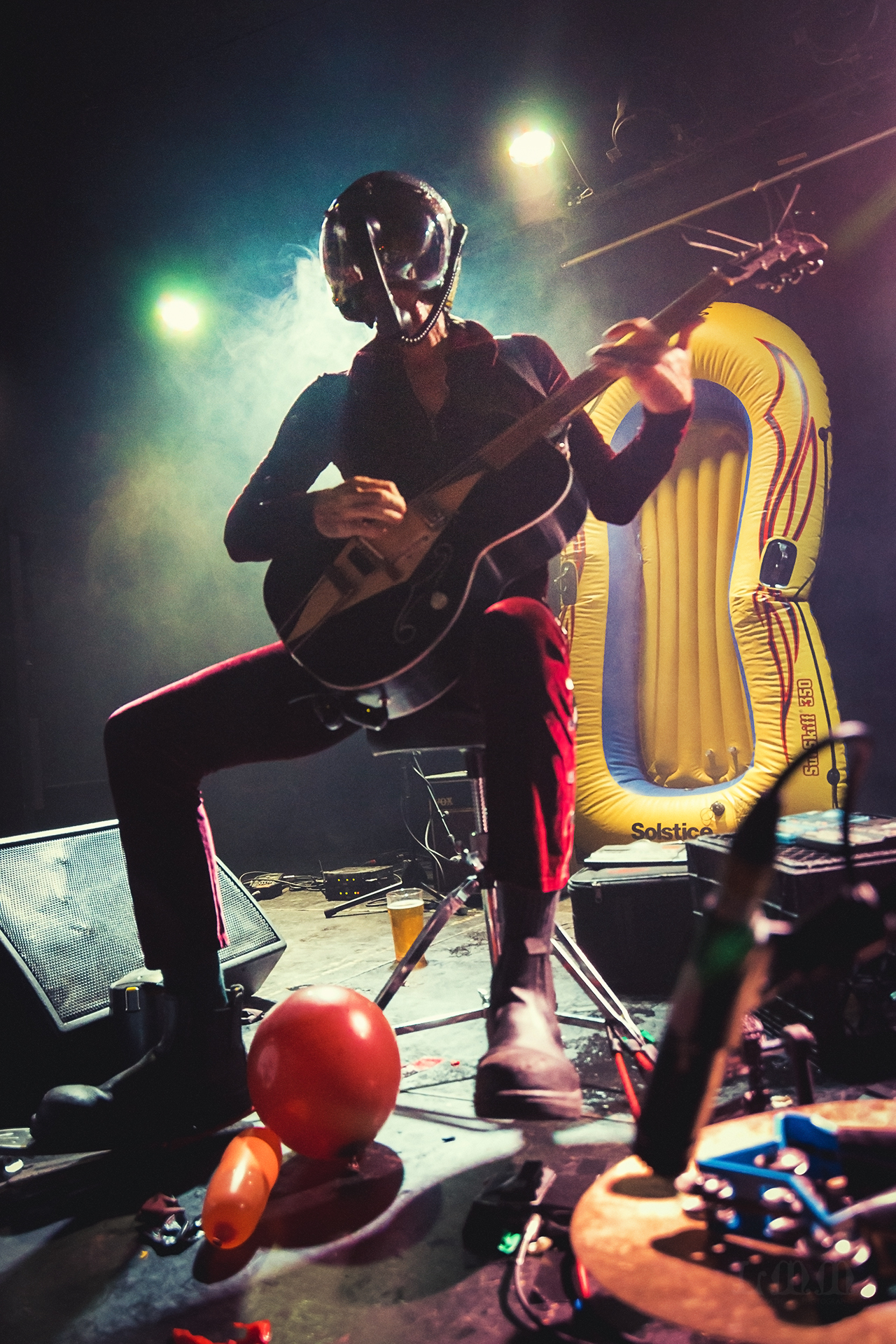
- Bob Log III in Québec City, Canada, 2014

Background information
- Born: November 21, 1969 (age 55) Chicago, Illinois, United States
- Origin: Tucson, Arizona, United States
- Genres: Rock and roll Lo-fi; Experimental rock Slide guitar blues
- Occupation(s): One-man band, musician
- Instrument(s): Slide guitar, drums, singing
- Years active: 1990 – present
- Labels: Bloat; Sympathy for the Record Industry; Dropkick; Fat Possum; Fanboy; Epitaph
- Website: www.boblog111.com

Robert Logan Reynolds III, known professionally as Bob Log III (born November 21, 1969) is an American slide guitar one-man band based in Tucson, Arizona, and Melbourne, Australia. During performances, he plays old Silvertone archtop guitars, wears a full body human cannonball suit, and a helmet wired to a telephone receiver, which allows him to devote his hands and feet to guitar and drums. His show has been described as a blues punk guitar dance party.

== Early life ==
Bob Log III was born in Chicago, Illinois and raised in Tucson, Arizona. Growing up, Log listened to musical artists such as AC/DC, Screaming Jay Hawkins, Bo Diddley, Hasil Adkins and Chuck Berry. Log got his first guitar at the age of 11, and by the age of 16 he had moved to slide guitar, playing Delta blues, modeling his slide guitar style on that of Mississippi Fred McDowell.

== Career ==
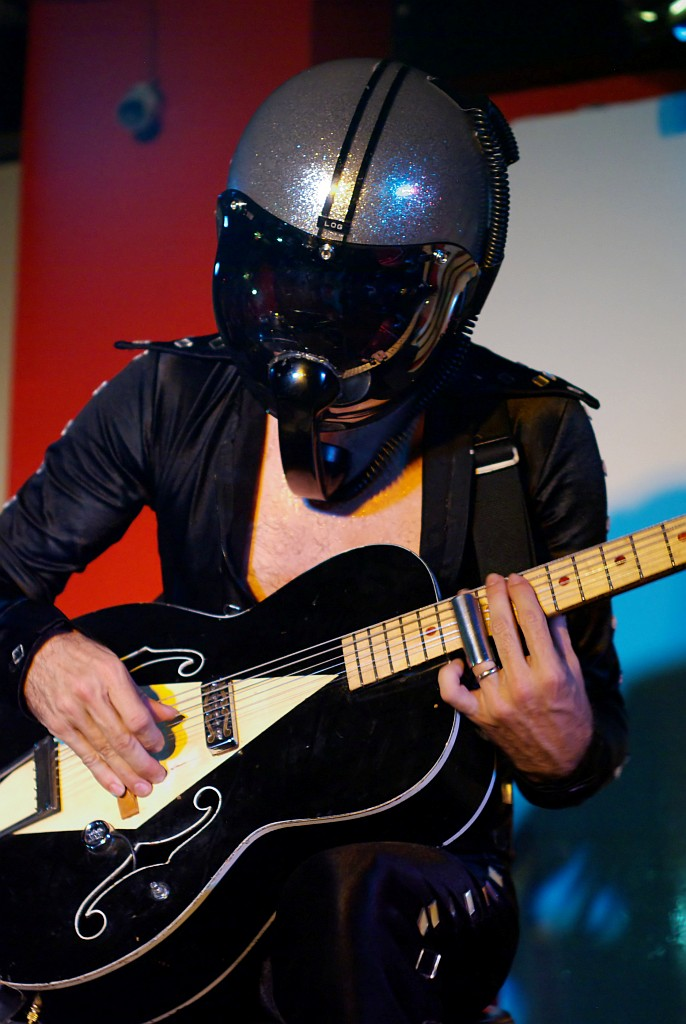
Bob Log III playing at the 100 Club in London, England, 2008

Log began his music career recording and touring with Mondo Guano, a four-piece slide guitar, blues, home-made percussion band based in Tucson, Arizona. Upon leaving Mondo Guano, Log went on to perform as one half of the Delta blues rock duo, Doo Rag, with bandmate Thermos Malling.

After six years of making music with Doo Rag, Bob began a solo career, warming up audiences bands, including R. L. Burnside, Blues Explosion, Ween, Franz Ferdinand, and Ani Difranco. Over time, Log acquired a kick-drum and a homemade foot cymbal which he custom-outfitted with a kick pedal of its own. These instruments, combined with his slide guitar work, telephone microphone vocals, and drum machine accompaniment, form the framework on which Bob Log constructs his songs. His version of quick Delta blues is based on the sound that he and Thermos developed in the duo Doo Rag, with greater emphasis on guitar showmanship, fingerpicking, and one-man-band-style drumming with his feet. He began touring in North America, including performances in Toronto in 1999 and 2000.

=== Audience participation ===
During performances Bob Log will often call audience members (both male and female) on stage to sit on his knee while he plays. Log credits years of drumming with his feet for his ability to simultaneously drum and support the weight of multiple people: "My legs are huge now. Sometimes I can get a girl on each knee and bounce 'em along." Log has distinctively used breasts as a theme in his performance and hired two "professional women" to use their breasts as percussion instruments on his song "Clap Your Tits". Log is quick to point out that all of these acts are carried out between consenting adults and individuals familiar with his brand of humor, stating, "First of all, if you come to my show knowing I've got a song called "Boob Scotch" and you get offended, I'm sorry but I've got to say just get out."

Eventually, Bob Log added a wireless set-up to his guitar in order to allow him to take part in more active antics about the venues in which he is playing. On a number of occasions, Bob has set sail atop his audience in an inflatable dinghy or played portions of his set from the women's washroom. During various shows on his September 2009 UK tour Bob Log would enter/exit the stage whilst playing guitar sitting on top of the shoulders of Russell Gray, lead singer of Russell and The Wolves.

=== Boob Scotch ===
One of Bob Log III's more controversial antics is 'Boob Scotch', that is, scotch which has been stirred by a female (or male) breast. This practice was integrated into the song "Boob Scotch" from the album Log Bomb, in which Bob Log sings "I think we need to sit down and talk, put your boob in my scotch. Come on dip your tit in my drink, stir my scotch with something that's pink."

Bob Log III often invites audience members to 'make' a Boob Scotch, asking them onstage to dip their breast in his scotch (usually ordered for him by a fan) after which he lifts his helmet slightly and downs the drink. Log has also been known to dip his own breast in his scotch.

== Lyrical quotes ==
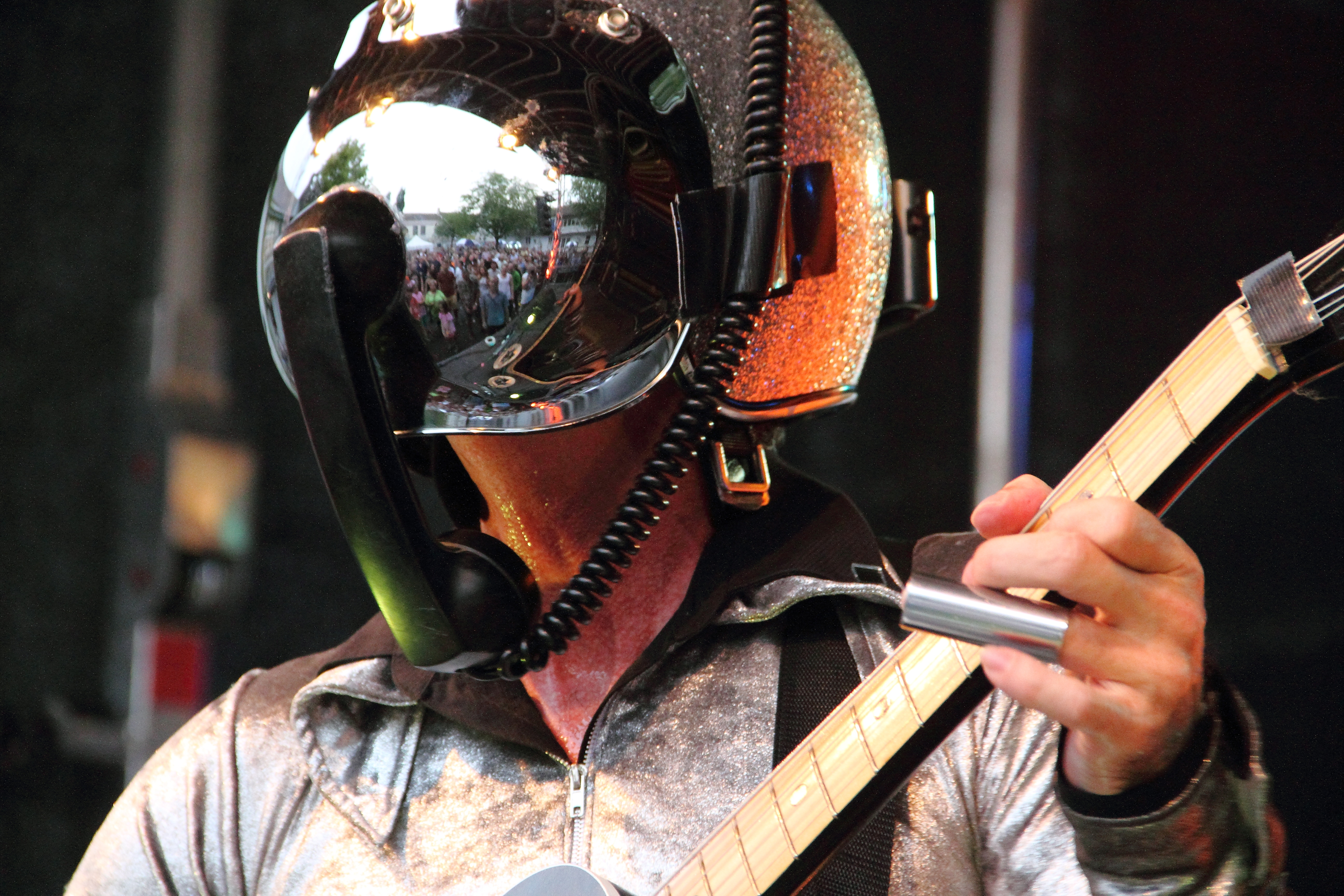
Bob Log III, 2018

- "I'm a professional, God damn it. I live in a car."
- "Ladies and gentlemen's ... We've all got boobs people, look between your, your, non-boobs ... what you're going to find is a nipple! No matter if you're a man or woman, OR an angry woman."

== Discography ==
=== Bob Log III ===
==== Albums ====
- School Bus (Fat Possum, 1998)
- Trike (Fat Possum, 1999)
- Live!!! Aloha from Japan (Bloat Records, 2000)
- Log Bomb (Fat Possum Records, 2003)
- My Shit is Perfect (Birdman, Voodoo Rhythm, Bloat Records, 2009)
- Hiram & Huddie Disc 1 – A Tribute to Hank Williams Sr (Hillgrass Bluebilly Records 2009)
- "Guitar Party Power" (Bob Log 111 2016)
- "Bump or Meow Vol 1" (Bob Log 111 2016)

==== Singles ====
- "Daddy Log's Drive In Candy Hoppin Car Babes" (Sympathy for the Record Industry)
- "I Want Your Shit On My Leg" (Dropkick)
- "Bubble Strut" (Dropkick)
- "Bump Pow! Bump Bump Bump Pow! Bump Pow! Bump Bump Bump, Baby! Bump Pow! Bump Bump Bump Pow! Bump Pow! Bump Bump Bump" (Munster)
- "Riverside (Tribute)"
- "Party Van" (The Hermit Strut)

=== With Doo Rag ===
==== Albums ====
- Chuncked & Muddled LP/CD/CS (Bloat Records, 1994, BLT 10048)
- Barber Shop CS (Bloat Records, 1994, BLT #?)
- Doo Rag, What We Do LP/CD (Dependability, 1996, L 45649)

==== Singles ====
- "Hussy Bowler" 7" (Westworld, 1993, WW-7)
- "Trudge" 7" (In The Red, 1994, ITR 021)
- "Swampwater Mop Down" 7" (Drunken Fish Records, 1995, DFR-11)
- "Two Tones To Tune" 7" (Discos Alehop!, 1997, hop 014)

==== Splits ====
- Sinful Tunes & Spirituals 2x7" (Au-Go-Go, 1998, ANDA 238)
