= Gateway Singers =

1950s American folk music group

The Gateway Singers were an American folk music group who achieved national prominence in the US in the late 1950s. The group was included in the Smithsonian's Folk Song America compilation. They are best known for their song "Puttin' on the Style", which sold one million copies and was later used in a beer commercial.

Gateway Singers member Lou Gottlieb left the band, obtained his PhD in musicology from the University of California and then formed The Limeliters. Travis Edmonson left the Gateway Singers to form the duo Bud & Travis with Bud Dashiell.

The group split in 1961, although three of the members—Milt Chapman, Betty Mann, and Jerry Walter—continued performing as the "Gateway Trio", and released albums for Capitol Records.

The Ed Sullivan Show reportedly cancelled a Gateway Singers appearance after executives from the CBS television network objected to showing a mixed-race group.

== Discography ==
- Puttin' on the Style
- Gateway Singers at the hungry i
- Gateway Singers in Hi Fi
- Wagons West
- Gateway Singers on the Lot
- Down in the Valley
- Live at Stanford 1957
