= Travis Edmonson =

American singer (1932–2009)

- Born: September 23, 1932; Long Beach, California, U.S.
- Died: May 9, 2009 (aged 76) Mesa, Arizona, U.S.
- Occupations: Singer, songwriter
- Instrument: Guitar
- Years active: 1957–1982
- Labels: World Pacific, Liberty, Reprise, Folk Era
- Website: http://www.travisedmonson.com/

Travis Edmonson (September 23, 1932 – May 9, 2009) was an American folk singer, who performed both as a soloist and in the duo Bud & Travis.

== Early life ==
Edmonson was born on September 23, 1932, in Long Beach, California, but grew up in Nogales, Arizona, just across the border from Mexico. At the age of 5, he briefly played the role of Curley on the Our Gang comedy short-film series. Edmonson began his singing career at age seven a member of the St. Andrew's Episcopal Church choir, where he sang with his three older brothers. He attended Tucson High School where he further developed as a singer and learned to play the guitar. After high school, Edmonson attended the University of Arizona, where he studied anthropology. Edmonson took a strong interest in Native American tribes, including the Pascua Yaqui Tribe, helping to produce a Spanish-Yaqui dictionary. As a result, in 1948, the tribe made him an honorary member. Travis studied other native communities, and even lived on an Apache reservation.

== Music career ==
Edmonson did not graduate from the University of Arizona, but he "became locally famous for serenading college girls". In the early 1950s, Edmonson served in the United States Army, before beginning his musical career in San Francisco. After singing solo, he joined a quartet, the Gateway Singers with Louis Gottlieb. In 1958, he left the Gateway Singers to form Bud & Travis along with Bud Dashiell, a friend of his brother. The two released 11 singles and eight albums from 1958 to 1965 and became quite popular, appearing at many nightclubs and on television, including a guest appearance on the show The Adventures of Ozzie and Harriet. The two played folk music, infused with the influence of Mexican styles that Edmonson enjoyed, particularly mariachi. After seven years together, the two split up and Edmonson continued to perform solo.

Edmonson was considered a folk music "pioneer" and influenced groups such as The Kingston Trio. Bob Shane, the only surviving member of the trio, said in an interview that he "idolized him", saying "he had command of the stage better than anyone I've ever seen." Edmonson suffered a stroke in 1982, after which he experienced health problems and performed little until his death on May 9, 2009, in Mesa, Arizona.

For his musical accomplishments, Travis was inducted into the Hall of Fame by the Tucson Area Music Awards in 1995.

== Solo discography ==
- Travis on Cue (Horizon WP-1606, 1962); recorded live at The Troubadour
- Travis on His Own (Reprise R9-6035, 1963); reissued in 1965 minus three cuts on Tradition TR-2074 as Travelin' with Travis
- The Liar's Hour (Latigo 32286, 1975); with Bill Moore
- Ten Thousand Goddam Cattle (Katydid 10076, 1977); with Katie Lee, Earl Edmonson, and David Holt
- The Tucson Tapes: The First Set (Folk Era 1460, 2001); recorded in 1966
- The Tucson Tapes: The Second Set (Folk Era 1461, 2001); recorded in 1966
- Live @ UC Santa Barbara 5/9/66 (Folk Era 1466, 2002); recorded in 1966
- Let's All Room Together Next Semester! – The Travis Edmonson Diamond Jubilee Anthology (2007)
- Viva Travis! – The Travis Edmonson Diamond Jubilee Anthology (2007); Spanish tracks from the Latin Album and others

Appearances

- Hootenanny at The Troubadour (Horizon WP-1616, 1963); "E La Bas"
- Hollywood Hootenanny (Horizon WP-1631, 1964); "The Things I've Saved"
