= Doo Rag =

Punk/blues band from Tucson, Arizona

- Origin: Tucson, Arizona, United States
- Genres: Rock; Punk blues Delta blues
- Years active: 1990 – 1996
- Labels: Westworld Records; Drunken Fish Records; Discos Alehop! Bloat Records
- Past members: Bob Log III; Thermos Malling

Doo Rag was an American lo-fi blues band duo from Tucson, Arizona, United States. The band consisted of Bob Log III and Thermos Malling. By the time of their breakup, they had supported a number of artists on tour, most notably Sonic Youth and Beck.

== History ==
The members of Doo Rag began performing together at a party in Tucson in 1990. "I had a snare drum with a guitar bolted onto it, and I was playing Fred McDowell songs when a friend jumped up and started banging a cheese grater with a spoon," guitarist Bob Log recalls. "The next day we went out on the sidewalk and played, hoping to scrounge up cigarette money". The band recorded a cassette together, which they self-released, and then began touring.

Doo Rag first gained recognition outside of Tucson playing in San Diego at the Casbah with members of the late '80s and early '90s cult underground band Crash Worship. Crash Worship had gotten a hold of their first self-released cassette tape in the early '90s and hadn't believed that they were an actual band, although they had been listening to it repeatedly as they had become fans of the mystery duo. Soon afterwards Doo Rag was opening for Crash Worship on several U.S. tours.

Soon after, they started playing semi-regularly in L.A. at a former bowling alley turned nightclub, where they first caught the attention of Beck before his hit "Loser" had garnered him national attention. Beck asked Doo Rag to open for him on his first major U.S. tour after his first Geffen Records release.

Doo Rag was soon after touring Europe and playing everything from small clubs to the huge outdoor summer music festivals in the Netherlands. In 1995, they played the side stage of Lollapalooza, where they met Sonic Youth, who had become ardent fans of the pair.

The next summer found Doo Rag touring with the Jon Spencer Blues Explosion and Delta blues legend R. L. Burnside.

While on tour in support of the band Ween, and after six years of working together, Malling left the tour to spend time with his new wife. Rather than stop playing guitar, Bob Log III decided to finish the tour as a one-man band. He purchased a drum machine, kicked a guitar case and a homemade kick cymbal, and invented a new way to play drums. He still employs this technique.

== Instruments ==
The group was known for Thermos Malling's unusual instrumentation and inventions, and Bob Log III's unique finger-picking style of guitar playing, as well as causing mini-riots in any club they performed in. Guitarist and singer Bob Log III played an acoustic/electric slide homemade dobro, which sounded akin to an electrocuted McDowell on amphetamines, mixed with AC/DC. He also played a $2 thrift-store guitar in a similar slide fashion, which often left the sound men at the clubs where they performed in awe at its wicked growl during sound check. Doo Rag also employed a number of Thermos Malling's unique microphone setups to distort the vocals, and was as likely to be singing through a vacuum cleaner hose as to be singing into two hairdryers with built-in microphones. Thermos Malling contributed percussion using a custom-made drum kit compiled from a Budweiser box for a bass drum, a tin bucket as a snare drum, an old film reel as a cymbal, an iron shopping basket used as a hi-hat, and a number of other found objects.

== Discography ==
=== Singles ===
- Hussy Bowler 7″ (Westworld, 1993, WW-7)
- Trudge 7″ (In The Red, 1994, ITR 021)
- Swampwater Mop Down 7″ (Drunken Fish Records, 1995, DFR-11)
- Two Tones To Tune 7″ (Discos Alehop!, 1997, hop 014)

=== Splits ===
- Sinful Tunes & Spirituals 2×7″ (Au-Go-Go, 1998, ANDA 238)

=== Albums ===
- Chuncked & Muddled LP/CD/CS (Bloat Records, 1994, BLT 10048)
- Barber Shop CS (Bloat Records, 1994, BLT #?)
- What We Do LP/CD (Dependability, 1996, L 45649)

Near the end of the band, and shortly after What We Do, the band acquired a 78 lathe and offered to release 100 personalized 78s, provided you sent your name and a message in time. None have become publicly available since this notification.

=== Appearances ===
- Thermos Malling appears on Now I Got Worry by the Jon Spencer Blues Explosion.
