= List of alternative R&B artists =

This is a list of alternative R&B artists. Alternative R&B (also known as PBR&B) fuses Contemporary R&B with other musical elements such as rock, hip-hop, EDM, dream pop, cloud rap, progressive soul, soul, jazz, chillwave, electro hop, trap, electropop, funk, trip hop and future garage. The subgenre rose to prominence in the late 2000s and eventually became a popular genre into the 2010s.

== Artists ==
- 070 Shake
- 6lack
- Aaliyah
- Abra
- Jhené Aiko
- AlunaGeorge
- Anders
- Omar Apollo
- Autre Ne Veut
- Erykah Badu
- Banks
- Blackbear
- Blood Orange
- Jesse Boykins III
- Daniel Caesar
- Alessia Cara
- Alex Clare
- D'Angelo
- Daley
- Dean
- Drake
- Dvsn
- Easy Life
- Brent Faiyaz
- Francis and the Lights
- Gallant
- Jack Garratt
- Groove Theory
- Sinéad Harnett
- H.E.R.
- How to Dress Well
- The Internet
- Ro James
- JMSN
- Kehlani
- Kelela
- Kelis
- Kenna
- Khalid
- Kiiara
- Kilo Kish
- King
- Steve Lacy
- Tory Lanez
- Jessy Lanza
- Ari Lennox
- Lion Babe
- Little Dragon
- Rosie Lowe
- Mariah the Scientist
- Majid Jordan
- Marian Hill
- Mateo
- Maxwell
- Miguel
- Rainy Milo
- Janelle Monáe
- Nick Murphy
- Nao
- Frank Ocean
- Oh Wonder
- Anderson Paak
- PartyNextDoor
- Jai Paul
- Raury
- Allan Rayman
- Rhye
- Dawn Richard
- Sampha
- Thee Satisfaction
- Sevdaliza
- Seinabo Sey
- Shy Girls
- Jorja Smith
- Solange
- Spooky Black
- SZA
- Tei Shi
- The Weeknd
- THEY.
- Bryson Tiller
- Tinashe
- Kali Uchis
- Samantha Urbani
- Summer Walker
- Wet
- Anna Wise
- Zayn
