= Katie Lee (singer) =

American singer, writer, environmentalist (1919–2017)

Background information
- Born: Kathryn Louise Lee; October 23, 1919; Aledo, Illinois, U.S.
- Died: November 1, 2017 (aged 98) Jerome, Arizona, U.S.
- Genre: Folk music
- Occupations: Actress, folk singer, writer, photographer, environmental activist
- Instruments: Vocals guitar
- Website: katydoodit.com

Katie Lee (October 23, 1919 – November 1, 2017) was an American folk singer, actress, writer, photographer and environmental activist.

From the 1950s, Lee often sang about rivers and white water rafting. She was a vocal opponent of Glen Canyon Dam, which closed its gates in 1963, and called for the canyon to be returned to its natural state. For her environmental activism, she was often called "the Desert Goddess of Glen Canyon."

Her obituary in The New York Times states, "Ms. Lee never forgave the builders of the Glen Canyon Dam and said the only thing that prevented her from blowing it up was that she did not know how."

== Early life ==
Kathryn Louise Lee was born in Aledo, Illinois on October 23, 1919, to decorator Ruth (Detwiler) and architect and homebuilder Zanna Lee. When she was three months old, her family moved to Tucson, Arizona. She graduated from the University of Arizona with a Bachelor of Fine Arts in Drama. Following her graduation, she left for Hollywood where she studied with two of the most successful folksingers of the 1940s, Burl Ives and Josh White.

== Folk singer and author ==
Lee's early folk music albums, Songs of Couch and Consultation (1957) and Life Is Just a Bed of Neuroses (1960), parody the rising popularity of psychoanalysis at the time. Both albums have long been out of print, but six of her later CDs remain available. She also released three videos, including Love Song to Glen Canyon (DVD, 2007).

In 1964, Lee released an album on Folkways Records, entitled Folk Songs of the Colorado River. In the 1980s, she recorded a cassette-only release, Colorado River Songs, consisting of old songs popular among river runners on the Colorado River and the Grand Canyon, and some original compositions. This release was hailed by Edward Abbey and David Foreman, among others. Colorado River Songs was expanded to include more songs and re-released in 1997 on CD. She released Glen Canyon River Journeys on CD, which mixes music and her narration. She also was featured on the 2005 Smithsonian Folkways compilation album, Songs and Stories from Grand Canyon. In October 2011, Katie Lee was inducted into the Arizona Music Hall of Fame.

She authored five books. Ten Thousand Goddam Cattle: A History of the American Cowboy in Song, Story and Verse (1976) is a study of the music, stories, and poetry of the American cowboy, later recorded as an album with Travis Edmonson. Sandstone Seduction, a 2004 memoir, relates Lee's continuing love affair with desert rivers and canyons, and discusses her Lady Godiva-style bicycle ride through downtown Jerome, Arizona, where she lived.

Lee donated her extraordinary collection of photographs, writings, songs and music, letters, and journals to the Cline Library Special Collections and Archives at Northern Arizona University.

Lee published music and books under the label Katydid Books and Music.

== Environmental activism ==
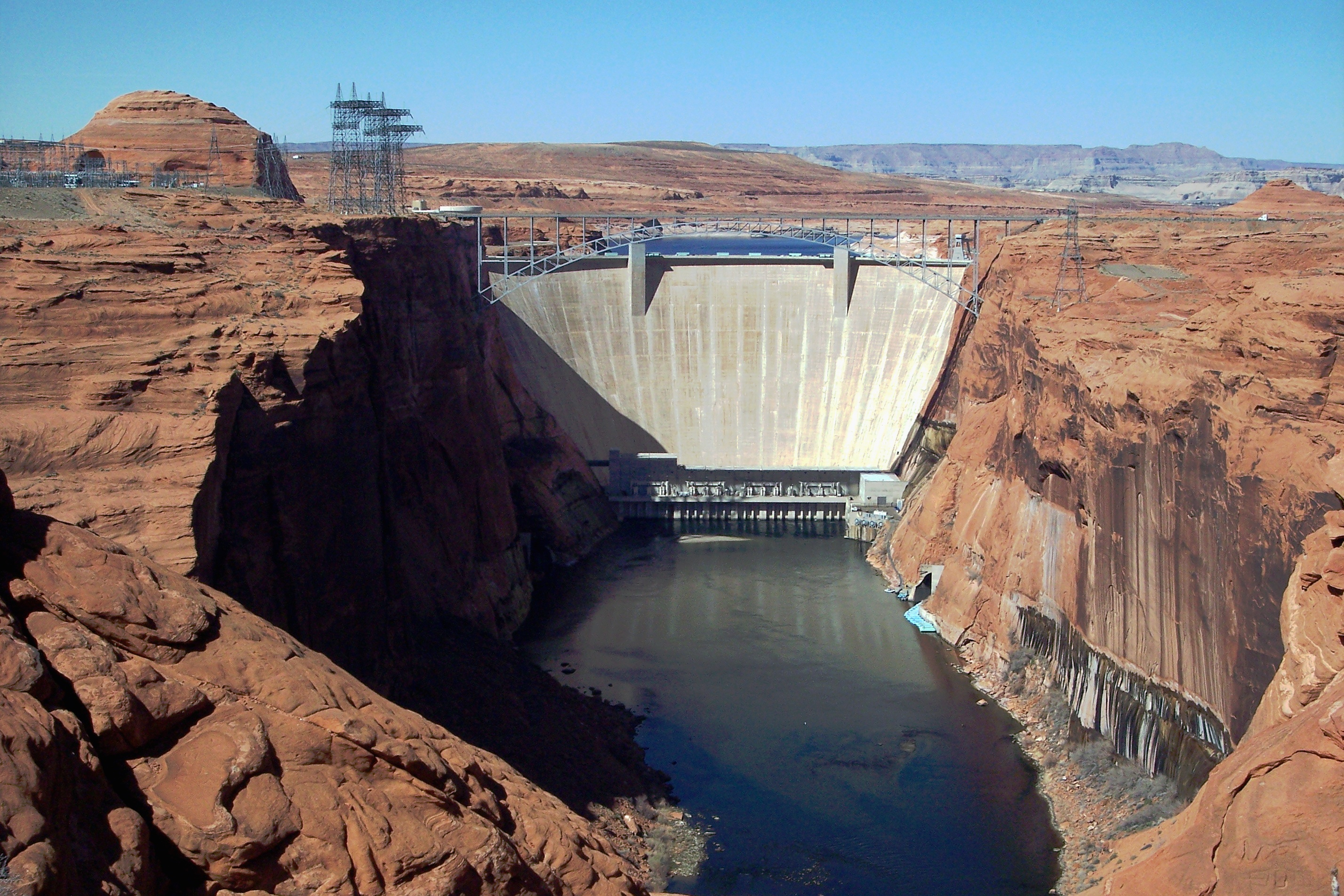
Glen Canyon Dam, to which Katie Lee was a vocal opponent

Lee was known for her activism against the damming of rivers, and particularly her opposition to Glen Canyon Dam in Northern Arizona, which opened in 1963. After joining a rafting trip in the Grand Canyon in 1953, she became a regular on river trips on the Colorado River and joined the opposition to the construction of Glen Canyon Dam.

In September and October 1955, Tad Nichols, Frank Wright, and she traveled through and documented parts of the canyon that later were to be submerged. This threesome named at least 25 of the side canyons they explored in Glen Canyon. Lee's campaign to protect the canyon included a one-woman protest exhibition of photographs where she posed naked among the canyon's landscape. Her protest was featured in books and folk songs she authored. "When they drowned that place, they drowned my whole guts," Lee said in a 2010 interview. "And I will never forgive the bastards. May they rot in hell." For her environmental activism, Lee was often described as "the Goddess of Glen Canyon."

Lee was a member of the Advisory Board of the Glen Canyon Institute which is a non-profit organization dedicated to the restoration of Glen Canyon and a free flowing Colorado River.

== Personal life ==
Records indicate that Lee seems to have been married three times. She mentions her marriage to Charles Eld in Sandstone Seduction, writing that she "...went to work for the war effort at Davis Monthan Field, married a shavetail in '42, got pregnant, had a son, [and] got divorced in '45." In 1950 Charles was awarded full custody of the son, identified as Ronald Eld in Lee's New York Times obituary from November 10, 2017. Lee briefly mentions with some regret an unnamed, 10-year-old son in 1954 journal. Photographs of Katie and a young "Ronnie" are included in the NAU Cline Library Colorado Plateau digital archives.

The New York Times obituary also mentions "Eugene Busch" (sic), Jr., whom Lee married in 1958. The Arizona Daily Star on June 16, 2015 includes a reprint of a 1959 article in which "Mrs. Gene Bush (Katie)" is interviewed in Holmdel, New Jersey. After the marriage ended in 1960, Lee moved from New Jersey to Aspen, Colorado.

On a trip to Baja California. in 1968 she met Edwin Carl "Brandy" Brandelius, Jr. When they married, Lee became the step-mother to Brandy's children Jerilyn Lee Brandelius and Ken, Susie, and John Brandelius.

Brandy was a war veteran with emphysema who became a race car driver, announcer, and good friend of Turk Murphy. Lee noted Brandy as the prime influence on finishing and publishing her first book, Ten Thousand Goddam Cattle. Brandy died in 1973. Lee dedicated her 2004 memoir, Sandstone Seduction, to Brandy .

Lee lived in Jerome, Arizona from 1971 until she died in her sleep at her home there on November 1, 2017, age 98. Lee's partner, Joey van Leeuwen, whom she met in 1979 in Australia while on a round-the-world trip, died by suicide the day after her death.

Katie and Joey were cremated and their ashes were scattered on the San Juan River.

== Popular culture ==
Chronicles of Lee's adventures in Baja California appear in the book Almost An Island by Bruce Berger. In 2016, a short documentary entitled Kickass Katie Lee was screened at Telluride Mountainfilm, a documentary film festival where Lee was a regular guest. Lee featured prominently in "Cry Me A River," a radio episode by The Kitchen Sisters, which explored the damming of American rivers.

Lee's song, "Gunslinger," from Songs of Couch and Consultation, was translated to Swedish in 1965 and was recorded by Per Myrberg as "Skjutgalen." It also was recorded by the Limeliters on their 1961 album, The Slightly Fabulous Limeliters. This may still be available on a BMG Collectibles CD. Utah Phillips praised Katie Lee and Songs of Couch and Consultation on the 1996 album, The Past Didn't Go Anywhere on the track, "Half a Ghost Town." British electronic duo Bent sampled the introduction to Lee's song "The Will to Fail" from Songs of Couch and Consultation on the song "Cylons in Love" on their debut album Programmed to Love.

== Discography ==
=== Studio albums ===
- Spicy Songs for Cool Knights (Specialty, 1956)
- Songs Of Couch And Consultation (Commentary, 1957)
- Life Is Just A Bed Of Neuroses (RCA Victor, 1960)
- Folk Songs of the Colorado River (Folkways, 1964)
- Love's Little Sisters (Katydid, 1975)
- Colorado River Songs (Katydid, 1976)
- Ten Thousand Goddam Cattle (Katydid, 1977, featuring Travis Edmonson, Earl Edmunson and David Holt)
- Fenced! (Katydid, 1978)
- His Knibbs & the Badger (Katydid, 1992, with Ed Stabler)
- Glen Canyon River Journeys (Katydid, 1998) (Note: Consists of readings and songs from Lee's book All My Rivers are Gone.)
- Folksongs from the Fifties (Katydid, 2009) (Note: The songs on this album were recorded in February 1955.)

=== Live albums ===
- The Best of Katie Lee: Recorded Live at the Troubadour (Essential Media, 1962)

== Bibliography ==
Lee published five books:

- Ten Thousand Goddam Cattle: A History of the American Cowboy in Song, Story & Verse (1976)
- All My Rivers are Gone: A Journey of Discovery through Glen Canyon (1998) (Note: Later republished as Glen Canyon Betrayed: A Sensuous Elegy, with an afterword by Lee.)
- Sandstone Seduction: Rivers and Lovers, Canyons and Friends (2004)
- Ballad Of Gutless Ditch (2010)
- The Ghosts of Dandy Crossing (2014)
