= Sing Out! (The Limeliters album) =

Studio album by The Limeliters
- Released: 1962
- Studio: RCA Victor's Music Center Of The World
- Genre: Folk
- Label: RCA Victor
- Producer: Neely Plumb

The Limeliters chronology
The Slightly Fabulous Limeliters (1961)	Sing Out! (1962)	Through Children's Eyes (1962)

Professional ratings
Review scores
Source	Rating
New Record Mirror	4/5 stars

Sing Out! is a studio album by the American folk music group, The Limeliters, a trio made up of Lou Gottlieb, Alex Hassilev, and Glenn Yarbrough. The album was recorded in studio at RCA Victor's Music Center Of The World. It was released in 1962 on the RCA Victor label (catalog no. LSP-2445).

The album debuted on Billboard magazine's Top 40 pop album chart on February 17, 1962, peaked at No. 14, and remained on the chart for 21 weeks.

AllMusic gave the album a rating of three stars. Reviewer William Ruhlmann wrote that the studio album was not as successful as the earlier live albums. He noted that the polish of the recording studio "did not entirely make up for the loss in atmosphere that an adoring club audience lent them."

== Track listing ==
Side A

1. "Jehosephat"
2. "Everywhere I Look This Morning"
3. "Pretty Far Out"
4. "The Lion and the Lamb"
5. "Golden Bell"
6. A Wayfaring Stranger"

Side B

1. "Charmin' Betsy"
2. "Gilgarry Mountain (Darlin' Sportin' Jenny)"
3. "Marvin"
4. "The Little Land"
5. "Joy Across the Land"
6. "Gotta Travel On"
