= Folk Matinee =

Studio album by The Limeliters
- Released: 1962
- Genre: Folk
- Label: RCA Victor

The Limeliters chronology
| Through Children's Eyes (1962) | Folk Matinee (1962) | Makin' a Joyful Noise (1963) |

Professional ratings
Review scores
| Source | Rating |
|---|---|
| New Record Mirror | 3/5 stars |

Folk Matinee is a studio album by the American folk music group, The Limeliters, a trio made up of Lou Gottlieb, Alex Hassilev, and Glenn Yarbrough. It was released in 1962 on the RCA Victor label (catalog no. LSP-2547).

The album debuted on Billboard magazine's pop album chart on October 13, 1962, peaked at No. 21, and remained on the chart for six weeks.

AllMusic gave the album a rating of four-and-a-half stars. Reviewer Cary Ginell wrote that the eclectic album was "not their best, but this studio album does have its moments."

== Track listing ==
Side A

1. "Sing Hallelujah" [2:06]
2. "Sweet Water Rolling" [2:28]
3. "Funk" [2:15]
4. "Blue Mountain Lake" [2:11]
5. "Tamborito" [2:07]
6. "Uncle Benny's Celebration" [2:19

Side B

1. "Wake Up, Dunia" [2:06]
2. "Die Gedanken Sind Frei" [2:07]
3. "To Everything There Is A Season (Turn! Turn! Turn!)" [2:09]
4. "Reedy River" [2:49]
5. "Those Were The Days" [3:06]
6. "The Minstrel Boy" [2:11]
