= Tonight: In Person =

Live album by The Limeliters
- Released: January 1961
- Recorded: July 29, 1960
- Venue: Ash Grove, Hollywood
- Genre: Folk
- Label: RCA Victor

The Limeliters chronology
The Limeliters (1960)	Tonight: In Person (1961)	The Slightly Fabulous Limeliters (1961)

Tonight: In Person is a live album by the American folk music group, The Limeliters, a trio made up of Lou Gottlieb, Alex Hassilev, and Glenn Yarbrough. It was recorded live on July 29, 1960, in Hollywood, California, at the Ash Grove, a former Melrose Avenue furniture factory converted into a folk music club. The album was released in January 1961 on the RCA Victor label (catalog no. LSP-2272). It was the group's first album for RCA Victor.

The album debuted on Billboard magazine's pop album chart on February 27, 1961, peaked at No. 5, and remained on the chart for 42 weeks.

AllMusic gave the album a rating of four-and-a-half stars. Reviewer Cary Ginell wrote that "this album is a winner all the way and one of the shining examples of the best of the urban folk revival of the early '60s."

== Track listing ==
Side A

1. "There's a Meetin' Here Tonight" (Alex Hassilev, Glenn Yarbrough) [2:16]
2. "Molly Malone" (arranged by Bob Gibson, Glenn Yarbrough) [2:39]
3. "The Monks of St. Bernard (Les Moines de Saint Bernardin)" (Alex Hassilev) [5:04]
4. "Seven Daffodils" (Lee Hays) [3:43]
5. "Hey Li Lee Li Lee" (Lou Gottlieb) [6:44]

Side B

1. "Headin' for the Hills" (John Stewart) [2:53]
2. "The Far Side of the Hill" [3:53]
3. "Rumania, Rumania" (Aaron Lebedeff) [3:23]
4. "Madeira, M'Dear" (Michael Flanders) [5:49]
5. "Proschai" (Lou Gottlieb, Gene Raskin) [3:01]
