= The Limeliters Reunion, Vol. 2 =

Live album by The Limeliters
- Released: 1976
- Recorded: September 28, 1976, Seattle Opera House
- Genre: folk
- Length: 36:44
- Label: Brass Dolphin
- Producer: Alex Hassilev

Professional ratings
Review scores
Source	Rating
AllMusic	4/5 stars

The Limeliters Reunion, Vol. 2 is an album released by The Limeliters in 1976 on Brass Dolphin LP record 2202. Recorded live on September 28, 1976 in the Seattle Opera House, the album documents one of the yearly reunion concerts given by the Limeliters in that decade. Vol. 1 contained new material, whereas this album was a tribute to the “folk mania” of the 1960s.

== Track listing ==
1. "Joy Across the Land" (Alex Hassilev)
2. "Acres of Limelighters" (Byron Robert Walls, Raksin)
3. "Funky in the Country" (Bob Gibson, Talbot)
4. "Minstrel Boy" (Leon Rudd, Ben Bruce)
5. "Risin' of the Moon" (Clancy Brothers)
6. "Whistlin' Gypsy" (Patrick L. Maguire)
7. "Gil Gary Mountain (Darlin' Sportin' Jenny)" (Gibson, Camp, Warner)
8. "Meetin' Here Tonight" (Bob Gibson)
9. "The Boxer" (Paul Simon, Art Garfunkel)
10. "John Henry" (Glenn Yarbrough, Alex Hassilev)
11. "Have Some Madera" (Michael Flander, Donald Swan)
12. "Hard Travelin' / Mount Zion" (Woody Guthrie / Cal Bagby)
13. "Wayfarin' Stranger" (Bob Gibson)
14. "Lonesome Traveler" (Lee Hays)

== Personnel ==
- The Limeliters (Lou Gottlieb, Alex Hassilev, Glenn Yarbrough)
- Mike Settle - acoustic guitar, vocals
- Brian Davies - acoustic guitar, electric guitar
- Gordon Currie - bass, vocals
- Jacqueline Furman - drums, percussion, vocals
- Geoffrey Pike - piano, synthesizer, vocals
