= The Limeliters (album) =

Studio album by The Limeliters
- Released: 1960
- Genre: Folk
- Label: Elektra

The Limeliters chronology
The Limeliters (1960)	Tonight: In Person (1961)

The Limeliters is a studio album by the American folk music group, The Limeliters, a trio made up of Lou Gottlieb, Alex Hassilev, and Glenn Yarbrough. It was released in 1960 on the Elektra label (catalog no. EKL-180). It was the group's first album and its only album for Elektra.

The album did not chart upon its release in 1960. However, the group's popularity grew the following year with the release of a live album, Tonight: In Person. The live album peaked at No. 5 on Billboard magazine's pop album chart, and the 1960 album then debuted on the chart in October 1961, peaking at No. 40.

AllMusic gave the album a rating of three stars. Reviewer Cary Ginell called it "an impressive debut" with strong three-part harmonies.

"Times Are Getting Hard" was used in the Breaking Bad episode "Ozymandias".

== Track listing ==
Side A

1. "The Hammer Song" (Seeger, Hays) [2:25]
2. "Battle at Gandessa" (Bessie, Yarbrough) [2:39]
3. "Charlie, The Midnight Marauder" (Davis, Bagby) [2:48]
4. "Zhankoye" (Seeger, Allaire) [2:29]
5. "When I First Came to This Land" (Reynolds, Bagby) [3:05]
6. "Malagueña Salerosa" (Reynolds, Hassilev, Bagby) [2:35]

Side B

1. "The Bear Chase" (Bagby) [2:05]
2. "The Burro" (Hassilev, Sheer) [3:53]
3. "Gari Gari" (Limeliters, Raskin) [2:42]
4. "John Henry, The Steel Driving Man" (Glen, Hassilev) [2:06]
5. "Times Are Getting Hard" (Hays, Raskin) [2:53]
6. "Lonesome Traveler" (Hays) [2:01]
