= The Slightly Fabulous Limeliters =

Live album by The Limeliters
- Released: 1961
- Genre: Folk
- Label: RCA Victor

The Limeliters chronology
Tonight: In Person (1961)	The Slightly Fabulous Limeliters (1961)	Sing Out! (1962)

The Slightly Fabulous Limeliters is a live album by the American folk music group, The Limeliters, a trio made up of Lou Gottlieb, Alex Hassilev, and Glenn Yarbrough.It was recorded in Berkeley, California and released in 1961 on the RCA Victor label (catalog no. LPM-2393).

The album debuted on Billboard magazine's pop album chart on October 9, 1961, peaked at No. 8, and remained on the chart for 22 weeks.

AllMusic gave the album a rating of three stars. Reviewer William Ruhlmann wrote that "it was the group's ability to mix different moods (along with their sheer singing talent) that made their act such a success in concert, a success transferred so effectively to disc that it seemed they should record nothing but live albums."

== Reception ==
Audio magazine reviewed the album positively, saying that "soon every college band in the country will be trying its hand at the tricky arrangements of Hard Ain't It Hard, Western Wind, and Aravah, Aravah". The Atlantic magazine was also praising, describing the album as marked by "boisterous sophistication". The 1998 book The Penguin Encyclopedia of Popular Music praised Yarborough's singing on the album.

The song "Harry Pollitt" on the album, the lyrics of which lampoon the former leader of the Communist Party of Great Britain, was heavily criticised in 1972 in Marxism Today (the official journal of that party) as "sickening" and "full of the vilest insults".

== Track listing ==
Side A

1. "Western Wind" [2:16]
2. "Medley: Hard Travelin'; Mount Zion" [1:37]
3. "Lass from the Low Country" [3:19]
4. "Gunslinger" [2:36]
5. "Curimã" [3:26]
6. "Vikki Dougan" [1:39]

Side B

1. "Aravah, Aravah" [2:21]
2. "Whistling Gypsy" [2:51]
3. "The Time of Man" [2:53]
4. "Harry Pollitt" [2:18]
5. "Hard Ain't It Hard" [2:43]
6. "Mama Don't 'Low" [2:16]
