= Our Men in San Francisco =

Live album by The Limeliters
- Released: 1963
- Venue: Hungry i
- Genre: Folk
- Label: RCA Victor

The Limeliters chronology
Makin' a Joyful Noise (1963)	Our Men in San Francisco (1963)	Fourteen 14K Folksongs (1963)

Professional ratings
Review scores
Source	Rating
New Record Mirror	4/5 stars

Our Men in San Francisco is a live album by the American folk music group, The Limeliters, a trio made up of Lou Gottlieb, Alex Hassilev, and Glenn Yarbrough. It was recorded at a live performance at the Hungry I nightclub in San Francisco. It was released in 1963 on the RCA Victor label (catalog no. LPM-2609).

The album debuted on Billboard magazine's Top 40 pop album chart on March 9, 1963, peaked at No. 37, and remained on the chart for two weeks.

AllMusic gave the album a rating of four stars. Reviewer Cary Ginell called it an "entertaining blend of humor, poignancy, and instrumental virtuosity."

== Track listing ==
Side A

1. "The Wabash Cannonball" [2:27]
2. "Max Goolis" [3:42]
3. "I'm Goin' Back" [2:07]
4. "Corn Whiskey" [3:56]
5. Civil War Medley: "Bright Golden Buttons"; "The First Battalion"; "Yes I See"; "Two Brothers" [6:20]

Side B

1. "By The Risin' Of The Moon" [3:31]
2. "Yerakina" [2:20]
3. "The Lute Player" ("Le Joueur De Luth") [4:57]
4. "The Jam On Jerry's Rock" [3:10]
5. "Sleep Soft (Lullaby)" [2:35]
6. Medley: "Goodnight Ladies"; "Leaving A Song" [2:54]
