= Ash Grove (music club) =

Folk music club in Los Angeles, 1958–1973

Coordinates: 34.08349°N 118.36733°W

The Ash Grove was a folk music club located at 8162 Melrose Avenue in Los Angeles, California, United States, founded in 1958 by Ed Pearl and named after the Welsh folk song, "The Ash Grove".

In its fifteen years of existence, the Ash Grove altered the music scene in Los Angeles and helped many artists find a West Coast audience. Bob Dylan recalled that, "I'd seen posters of folk shows at the Ash Grove and used to dream about playing there." The club was a locus of interaction between older folk and blues legends, such as Mississippi John Hurt, Son House, Earl Hooker and Muddy Waters, and young artists that produced the 'Sixties music revolution. Among those Pearl brought to the Ash Grove were Canned Heat, Doc Watson, Pete Seeger, Bill Monroe, June Carter, Johnny Cash, Jose Feliciano, Phil Ochs, Joan Baez, Hoyt Axton, Johnny Otis, Ramblin' Jack Elliott, Ian and Sylvia, Kathy and Carol, Sonny Terry, Brownie McGhee, New Lost City Ramblers, The Weavers, The Greenbriar Boys, Nitty Gritty Dirt Band, Lightnin' Hopkins, John P. Hammond, Luke "Long Gone" Miles, Barbara Dane, Holly Near, Arlo Guthrie, Rising Sons, Mance Lipscomb, Guy and Candie Carawan, John Jacob Niles, Bukka White, Howlin' Wolf, Johnny Shines, John Fahey, Willie Dixon, Lonnie Mack, Kris Kristofferson, and Country, featuring Michael Fondiler and Tom Snow. Country's performance was hosted by Mick Jagger. Michael and Mick Jagger were old friends.

The Limeliters performed at the Ash Grove on July 29, 1960. Their performance was recorded and became the LP Tonight: In Person - The Limeliters. The group consisted of Lou Gottlieb, Alex Hassilev and Glenn Yarbrough; quoting from the back cover of the album,

You leave the Ash Grove convinced your friends were right. This group IS great.

— Lee Shito, The Billboard

== "A university of folk music" ==
Folk singer Ross Altman likened the Ash Grove to a "West Coast University of Folk Music." Ry Cooder first public performance was playing backing guitar for Jackie DeShannon at the Ash Grove in 1963 when he was sixteen years old. Linda Ronstadt got her start hanging out at the Ash Grove. "My goal in those days was just to play the Ash Grove in Los Angeles because that was the center of folk music at the time", she remembered. "The first place I went in Los Angeles was the Ash Grove. That is where I met Kenny Edwards. Kenny liked Mexican music and we started the Stone Poneys." Future Byrds Chris Hillman and Clarence White met at the Ash Grove while both were in high school. They then played there with The Byrds on May 23, 1969.

While the club was best known for "folk" or "roots" music, such as bluegrass and blues, Ed Pearl also featured socially committed jazz and rock artists, such as Oscar Brown Jr., Chuck Berry, James Booker and Jackson Browne. And, long before there was a recognized "world" genre in the music industry, the Ash Grove provided a venue in Los Angeles for such diverse performers as Ravi Shankar, Mongo Santamaría, Miriam Makeba and the Virgin Islands Steel Band.

The Ash Grove also became associated with the cultural and political ferment of the 1960s. In the coffee house tradition, Pearl encouraged an occasional mix of music with poetry, lecture, film or comedy. Lenny Bruce, Mort Sahl, the Firesign Theatre, Rowan & Martin and Steve Allen brought their comedy and commentary to the Ash Grove. Luis Valdez's El Teatro Campesino performed, as did Dr. Demento, poet Charles Bukowski and artists campaigning against the Vietnam War, such as Jane Fonda.

== Attacks and closing ==
When travelers returning from Cuba gave talks or showed Cuban films, the Ash Grove became the target of angry demonstrations and threatened violence by Cuban exiles. A series of fires, including what patrons believed was an arson attack, led to the club's demise in 1973.

Following the military coup in Chile that same year, Pearl lent his expertise to Los Angeles solidarity activists, helping them set up major concerts for such Latin American nueva canción groups as Inti-Illimani, Quilapayún, Los Parra and Los Folkloristas, as well as the first-ever Los Angeles concert by Catalan singer-songwriter Joan Manuel Serrat. These events were part of the gestation of world music in Los Angeles.

== Legacy ==
Some 3,000 hours of recorded live performances at the Ash Grove have survived.

In a way, the Ash Grove was a victim of its own success, helping develop Los Angeles audiences for younger musicians who then needed larger venues for their concerts. But none of the city's new clubs consistently emphasized the roots music that Pearl put at the heart of the Ash Grove's line up. Pearl blamed consolidation in the music industry for undermining the coffeehouse music tradition and closing the door on socially committed artists. The big companies bought up small labels to gain control of their catalogues, he said; but they then did not support or promote new folk music talent. Corporate control of radio playlists homogenized musical culture, according to Pearl. This effect is known as Radio Homogenization.

After the Ash Grove closed in 1973, LA Times music critic Robert Hilburn wrote its obituary, which included an anecdote about the club's influence on the Rolling Stones: "On his way out of the Ash Grove one night, Mick Jagger, a frequent visitor to the club, shook Pearl's hand in gratitude. He simply wanted to thank Pearl for all the entertainment – and no doubt musical education – the club had given him." And, Hilburn concluded, "The Ash Grove's contribution to this city's musical heritage was invaluable."

In 1974, the Los Angeles branch of the New York City-based comedy venue, The Improv, opened in the former Ash Grove space, where it established its own reputation and prominence, up to this day.

In 2015, a series of Ash Grove-branded musical events, including a 57th Anniversary Concert, was held at the Improv, under the guidance of Ed Pearl, celebrating the Ash Grove's history and legacy in its original venue. Featured performers for these events included Claudia Lennear, The Chambers Brothers, Roy Zimmerman and Jackson Browne.

Two other notable musicians—brothers Dave Alvin and Phil Alvin—have often discussed the formative experiences they had at the Ash Grove. The title song of Dave Alvin's 2004 album Ashgrove sets his memories and the club's history to music.
