= Vikki Dougan =

American model and actress

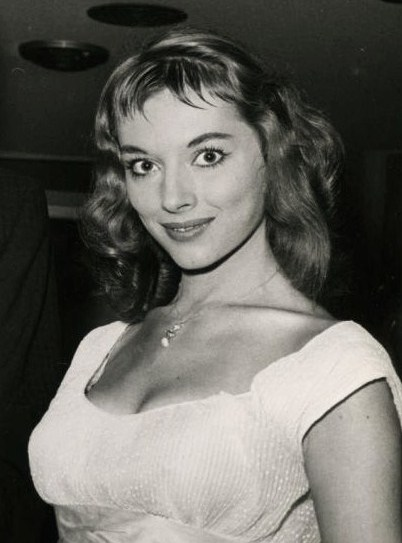
- Vikki Dougan in 1957
- Born: Edith Tooker; January 1, 1929 (age 97); New York City, U.S.
- Occupations: Actress, model
- Years active: 1953-1967
- Spouses: William Symons (m. 1946; div. 1950) Jim Sweeney (m. 1960; div. 1963)
- Children: 2

Vikki Dougan (born Edith Tooker, January 1, 1929) is a retired American actress and model.

== Early years ==
Vikki Dougan was born Edith Tooker in Brooklyn, New York on January 1, 1929. Her mother was a librarian and her father was an insurance salesman. Her father left the family when Dougan was six months old.

Dougan began modelling at age eleven. She had a successful career in modelling before gaining her first movie role in Back from Eternity (1956) as an uncredited showgirl. She gained small parts in another nine movies.

Dougan won multiple beauty pageants, including the Miss Coney Island pageant and the eighth annual New York Skate Queen contest. She began modelling as a teenager, changing her name to Vikki after the actress Vicki Lester and Dougan after her mother’s maiden name.

== Career ==
In 1956, publicity-man Milton Weiss had the idea of promoting Vikki using a backless dress to garner publicity. The idea was to gain a contrast with the fashion for models and actresses with large bosoms, such as Jayne Mansfield.

In 1953, photographer Ralph Crane photographed Dougan for Life magazine, and their October 26 edition featured Dougan on the cover.

In April 1954, Dougan appeared in a parody titled "This Is Your Story" on Sid Caesar's Your Show of Shows. It was a live sketch that was not only Caesar's all-time favorite, but one also considered to be possibly the funniest sketch in the history of TV comedy.

In June 1957, Dougan appeared in Playboy magazine (Vol. 4, Issue 6). Dougan featured again in the December 1962 issue, under the section "Playboy's Other Girlfriends".

In 1961, her backless dresses and "callipygian cleft" were celebrated in the song "Vikki Dougan" by The Limeliters in their album The Slightly Fabulous Limeliters.

In January 1964, Cavalier magazine featured twelve nude photographs of Vikki Dougan in a pictorial entitled "The Back is Back". Dougan brought a lawsuit against the magazine, stating that the magazine did not have permission to publish them. The photographs had been posed for Playboy but Dougan had subsequently declined to let Playboy publish the photographs.

== Personal life ==
Dougan married William Symons, owner of a photo studio, in 1946. They divorced in 1950, the same year their daughter Deirdre was born.

Throughout the 1950s, she dated a string of prominent men, including Barry Goldwater Jr., Mickey Rooney, Henry Fonda, Frank Sinatra and Glenn Ford.

In 1960, Dougan married Jim R. Sweeney, an ex-football player from Texas Christian University. They had a daughter, Tiffany. This marriage, like her first, was short lived.

She was lifelong friends with Sandra Giles and Gloria Pall.

She lives in Beverly Hills, California, regularly attends the Los Angeles Jewish Film Festival and recently did interviews with Hollywood Exclusive, The New York Times, and Classic Images.
