= Through Children's Eyes (Little-Folk Songs for Adults) =

Live album by The Limeliters
- Released: 1962
- Genre: Folk
- Label: RCA Victor

The Limeliters chronology
Sing Out! (1962)	Through Children's Eyes (1962)	Folk Matinee (1962)

Through Children's Eyes (Little-Folk Songs for Adults) is a live album by the American folk music group, The Limeliters, backed by a chorus of 70 children from the Berkeley Unified School District in California. The album was recorded on 29 December 1961 at the Berkeley Community Theater, Berkeley, California as a "benefit for the Music Department of the Berkeley school system, as well as an opportunity to record The Limeliters in unusual and delightful circumstances." It was released in 1962 on the RCA Victor label (catalog no. LPM-2512). Each of the original members of the group cited the album as their most satisfying. On the liner notes of the album, Gottlieb said: "I cannot tell you what a kick it was to sing with those children...The sound of their voices was - and I know this seems corny but it is true - simply an inspiration to us."

The album debuted on Billboard magazine's pop album chart on June 16, 1962, peaked at No. 25, and remained on the chart for 11 weeks.

AllMusic gave the album a rating of four-and-a-half stars. Reviewer Cary Ginell called it "a great album" and urged, "Get it for your kids."

== Track listing ==
Side A

1. "This Train"
2. "Marty"
3. "Hey Jimmy Joe John Jim Jack"
4. "The Whale"
5. "Grace Darling"
6. "Morningtown Ride"
7. "Join Into the Game"

Side B

1. "I Had a Mule"
2. "Lollipop Tree"
3. "Run, Little Donkey"
4. "The Riddle Song"
5. "Stay on the Sunny Side"
6. "B-A Bay"
7. "America The Beautiful; This Land Is Your Land"
