= It's Gonna Be Fine =

Single by Glenn Yarbrough

from the album It's Gonna Be Fine
- B-side: "She"
- Released: July 1965
- Genre: Folk
- Length: 2:09
- Label: RCA Victor 8619
- Songwriter(s): Barry Mann, Cynthia Weil
- Producer(s): Al Schmitt, Neely Plumb

Glenn Yarbrough singles chronology
"Baby the Rain Must Fall" (1965)	"It's Gonna Be Fine" (1965)	"Ain't No Way" (1965)

"It's Gonna Be Fine" is a song written by Barry Mann and Cynthia Weil and performed by Glenn Yarbrough. It reached #9 on the U.S. adult contemporary chart an #54 on the Billboard Hot 100 in 1965. It was featured on his 1965 album, It's Gonna Be Fine.

The song was produced by Al Schmitt and Neely Plumb and arranged by David Gates.

This same song was also covered by The New Christy Minstrels on their 1965 album, Chim Chim Cheree.
