= Kathy and Carol =

American folk musician duo

- Origin: Vista, California, United States
- Genres: Folk
- Years active: c.1962–1968 occasionally since 2005
- Labels: Elektra, Hazelwood
- Members: Kathleen Larisch; Carol McComb

Kathleen Larisch and Carol McComb are American singers and instrumentalists, who performed together in the 1960s as Kathy and Carol. As a duo, they released an acclaimed 1965 folk song album on Elektra Records, before pursuing separate careers. They have reunited to perform together on several occasions in recent years.

== Early career and recordings ==
Kathy Larisch and Carol McComb began singing together when in high school at Vista, California, in the early 1960s. They both played guitar and autoharp, and claimed influences from Joan Baez, Gene Autry, and Tex Ritter, among others. They worked as a duo in Southern California folk clubs, sometimes opening for the likes of Bill Monroe, Taj Mahal and Phil Ochs, and performed regularly at the Ash Grove in Los Angeles. Folk musician Michael Cooney then introduced them to singer Mark Spoelstra, who in turn recommended them to Elektra producer Paul Rothchild. In mid-1964, after they had performed at the Berkeley Folk Festival, Joan Baez also recommended them to Rothchild, and he agreed to record a demo session with them. Elektra label boss Jac Holzman heard the recordings and agreed that they should make an album, which was recorded, with Rothchild producing, in the winter of 1964-65.

Their debut album, Kathy & Carol, was released in April 1965. It contained mostly traditional British and American ballads, apart from one song written by Spoelstra. Paul Rothchild said of their album that it was "the most beautiful Renaissance ballad record I ever heard. It's just perfect. If you like Joan Baez, here's Joan Baez times two, with gorgeous harmony, singing purist songs like angels." Critic Richie Unterberger stated that "what made it stand out most from similar releases of the time were the pair's extraordinary close, high, and haunting harmonies." McComb said later: "We would hear somebody like Bonnie Dobson or Joan Baez or Judy Collins do a song, and we would decide that we would want to do that song. But we never wanted to do anybody else's versions of the song. So we'd... find ourselves the best set of words we could, and we'd copy out various different melodies out of the songbooks... We would put together the best melody we could find with the best lyrics we could find, and that would be the Kathy & Carol version. We just didn't want to do it like anybody else did it."

The album was released shortly before the Newport Folk Festival, where the duo performed a song by Richard Fariña which was later released as part of the CD of the festival. They also began work to record a second LP, writing some of their own material and preparing to perform with a rock band - it is not known which one. However, in early 1966 Paul Rothchild was imprisoned on drug charges, and the album was never recorded. The pair did record for the small Folk-Legacy label, but that work was also unreleased because the duo's songs, by that time, were going beyond the traditional folk material in which the label specialised. Further material produced by Larry Murray of the band Hearts & Flowers was not released, and the duo also recorded unreleased material with both Linda Ronstadt and Rusty Young, later of Poco. In the late 1960s, the duo split up when Larisch decided to pursue a fine arts degree.

== Later careers ==
Kathleen Larisch gave up her career in music, and later became a teacher of fine arts at California College of the Arts. She has exhibited work in the media of painting, printed textiles, prints on paper, and photography.

Carol McComb continued to be an active performer. She played and toured with Mimi Fariña between 1969 and 1971, and released a solo album, Love Can Take You Home Again, in 1975. Between 1975 and 1980 she fronted a band called Moonstone, who released one album. Her solo albums included Tears into Laughter (1990) and Little Bit of Heaven (2000). She wrote and published the instructional book Country and Blues Guitar for the Musically Hopeless (1991), and has run folk guitar workshops in Palo Alto, California, as well as teaching guitar, harmony singing, voice and songwriting in the San Francisco Bay Area and at summer music camps nationwide. She also formed the Gryphon Quintet, and later the Gryphon Carollers with Ed Johnson and student members of a harmony singing class at Gryphon Stringed Instruments. Both the Quintet and the Carollers released albums, including They All Laughed (1983), Undecided (1985), Gryphon Quintet - Live! (1987), Winter's Gift (1997), and One December Night (2004). Carol has occasionally performed with Joan Baez and Linda Ronstadt. Ronstadt and McComb planned to release an album of their own, but it was never recorded due to health issues.

== Reissues and reunions ==
Kathy & Carol was reissued by Collector's Choice Music in 2004. Following that, the pair reunited to perform at the California Autoharp Gathering in 2005 and 2006, and have also performed together at other events in California.

They released another album, Keepsake, on Hazelwood Records in 2010. The album consists of songs, some originally recorded by the Carter Family, and others written by McComb.

== Discography ==
=== Kathy and Carol ===
- Kathy & Carol, Elektra EKL 289 (Mono) / EKS 7289 (Stereo), 1965
  - Reissue, Collector's Choice B00020QWRS, 2004
- Keepsake, Hazelwood, 2010

=== Carol McComb ===
- Love Can Take You Home Again, 1975, Bay Records (Carol McComb and Friends)
- They All Laughed, 1983 (Gryphon Quintet)
- Undecided, 1985 (Gryphon Quintet)
- Live!, 1987 (Gryphon Quintet)
- Tears into Laughter, 1990
- Winter's Gift, 1997 (Gryphon Carollers)
- Little Bit of Heaven, 2000
- One December Night, 2004 (Gryphon Carollers)
