= Baby the Rain Must Fall (song) =

Single by Glenn Yarbrough

from the album Baby the Rain Must Fall
- B-side: "I've Been to Town"
- Released: January 1965
- Recorded: 1964
- Studio: RCA Victor's Music Center of the World, Hollywood, California
- Genre: Folk
- Length: 2:17
- Label: RCA Victor; 47-8498
- Songwriter(s): Elmer Bernstein, Ernie Sheldon
- Producer(s): Neely Plumb

Glenn Yarbrough singles chronology
"Jenny's Gone and I Don't Care" (1964)	"Baby the Rain Must Fall" (1965)	"It's Gonna Be Fine" (1965)

"Baby the Rain Must Fall" is a song written by Elmer Bernstein and Ernie Sheldon and performed by Glenn Yarbrough after he left the Limeliters for a solo career. In early 1965, the track reached No.2 on the adult contemporary chart and No.12 on the Billboard chart. It also reached No.3 in South Africa.

It is the title song of the movie, Baby the Rain Must Fall and is heard during the opening credits.

Yarbrough put it up front on his 1965 album, Baby the Rain Must Fall, which was recorded at RCA Victor's Music Center of the World in Hollywood, California.

The arrangement was by Bread lead singer David Gates. Earl Palmer played drums.

== Other Versions ==
- Chris Connor, on her 1965 album Sings Gentle Bossa Nova.
- Trini Lopez
