= Baby the Rain Must Fall =

1965 film by Robert Mulligan

- Theatrical release poster
- Directed by: Robert Mulligan
- Screenplay by: Horton Foote
- Based on: The Traveling Lady; 1954 play by Horton Foote
- Produced by: Alan J. Pakula
- Starring: Lee Remick; Steve McQueen; Don Murray
- Cinematography: Ernest Laszlo
- Edited by: Aaron Stell
- Music by: Elmer Bernstein
- Color process: Black and white
- Production companies: Park Place Production; Solar Productions
- Distributed by: Columbia Pictures
- Release date: January 13, 1965 (New York City)
- Running time: 100 minutes
- Country: United States
- Language: English
- Box office: $1,500,000

Baby the Rain Must Fall is a 1965 American Southern Gothic drama film directed by Robert Mulligan and starring Lee Remick, Steve McQueen and Don Murray. Dramatist Horton Foote, who wrote the screenplay, based it on his 1954 play The Traveling Lady. This is Glen Campbell's film debut, in an uncredited role.

== Plot ==
Georgette Thomas and her six-year-old daughter, Margaret Rose, travel from the East Texas town of Tyler to (unknown to him) meet her husband Henry Thomas in his small southeastern Texas hometown of Columbus. Henry is a somewhat irresponsible rockabilly singer-guitarist with string bands, who has recently been released from prison after serving time for stabbing a man during a drunken brawl, and wasn't thinking of Georgette at all.

After his reunion with his wife, and his introduction to his daughter, Henry tries to make a home for his family. But Kate Dawson(Miss Kate), the aging spinster who raised him after his parents died, remains a formidable presence in his life and tries to sabotage his efforts. She threatens repeatedly to have him returned to prison if he fails to acquiesce to her demands to give up singing, go to night school, and get a real job. He resists this and convinces Georgette he will be a star someday, as he continues playing and working a part-time job with the Tillmans.

Henry is informed that Miss Kate is on her death bed, and he arrives at the old home with his family and the Tillmans. As he sits in vigil, she wakes to deliver her final words to him. She looks at him and tells him he was "never no good" and "not even worth killing." As he stares impassively, she tilts her head and dies. At the funeral, the Tillmans inform Henry that Miss Kate was in debt and there was nothing left in the will for him except objects and furniture in the home.

Henry drunkenly destroys her possessions that evening—several shots show a belt, implying that she beat him with it, hanging on a door near her bedroom—leaves with the silver willed to Mrs. Tillman. Afterwards, he wrecks his car on the cemetery gate and repeatedly stabs her grave with a knife in hysteria while, unbeknownst to him, his wife is nearby watching in horror.

Henry is destined for prison again, so Georgette and Margaret Rose leave Columbus in a car driven by Henry's childhood friend, the local sheriff's deputy, Slim. Slim had tried to help straighten Henry out since before the arrival of Georgette and Margaret Rose to Columbus, but failed. Georgette had done her best to love and gently comfort her self-tortured and cold husband Henry, but was also unsuccessful.

In the final scene, after an indeterminate time has passed and they have loaded their vehicle and driven away from the rented house, Georgette sees Henry (as does Slim) in the barred back of a sheriff's vehicle at a road crossing stop. She turns Margaret Rose away before she sees him, bound on his way back to "the pen".

As they drive out of town and enter the open highway, Georgette answers Margaret Rose's question of where they are going; that they are driving away to the warm Valley, to begin a new life together. Georgette tells Margaret Rose that they have traveled a long way, from Lovelady to Tyler, from Tyler to Columbus, and now to the distant Valley (Lovelady is Georgette's hometown, and where she and Henry met and married), and notes to the child that nobody could say they don't get around.

== Cast ==
- Lee Remick as Georgette Thomas
- Steve McQueen as Henry Thomas
- Don Murray as Deputy Sheriff Slim
- Paul Fix as Judge Ewing
- Josephine Hutchinson as Mrs. Ewing
- Ruth White as Miss Clara
- Charles Watts as Mr. Tillman
- Carol Veazie as Mrs. Tillman
- Estelle Hemsley as Catherine
- Kimberly Block as Margaret Rose
- Zamah Cunningham as Mrs. T.V. Smith
- George Dunn as Counterman
- Georgia Simmons as Miss Kate Dawson (uncredited)
- Glen Campbell as Band Member (uncredited)

== Production ==
The film was shot on location in the Texas cities of Columbus, Bay City, Wharton and Lockhart, and a scene in which Lee Remick works at a hamburger joint was filmed at the Baskin-Robbins ice cream store in Tarzana, California.

Many of the scenes were filmed in Columbus (the movie's actual locale), including those of the Colorado County Courthouse, the downtown store and bus shots (to the west of the Courthouse, on Milam St.), the Tillman's house (a block away from the Courthouse), and those of the Columbus Cemetery. A significant evening scene, in which late-working Deputy Slim and Judge Ewing walk away from the Courthouse toward the street, shows a notable Columbus building (now a museum) across Spring Street: the historic 1886 Stafford-Miller House. Some of the downtown scenes show another notable Columbus building in the background, the 1886 Stafford Opera House (next to the Stafford-Miller House; both south of the Courthouse), especially the morning scenes in front of the real estate office.

The last part of the "goodbye" scene, in which Henry leaves behind deputy Slim, the sheriff, Georgette and Margaret Rose, and takes off running, trips, then grabs onto the back of a flatbed truck, falls to the road and is captured by Slim, was filmed in Wharton at the southern end of Texas Farm to Market Road 102, (FM-102). The isolated country rental house scenes in which Henry, Georgette and Margaret Rose live together were filmed near Bay City, just inland of the Gulf coast, south of Wharton and Columbus.

The title song, with music composed by Elmer Bernstein and lyrics written by Ernie Sheldon, was performed by Glenn Yarbrough during the opening credits. Yarbrough's recording reached #12 on the Billboard Hot 100 and #2 on the Easy Listening chart. An instrumental version of the title song is used on some versions of film.

In one scene in which McQueen sings at a bar with his rockabilly band, one of his bandmates (to Henry's right) is singer-songwriter Glen Campbell, who is extremely visible standing behind McQueen in a close two-shot but is uncredited in the film. The band drummer, also uncredited, is fellow session musician Hal Blaine, both members at that time of the famed Los Angeles-based "Wrecking Crew".

It was the only film role of child actress Kimberly Block.

== Critical reception ==
Bosley Crowther, film critic for The New York Times, wrote, "As honest and humble as is the effort to make the viewer sense a woman's baffled love for a shifty and mixed-up fellow in Baby, the Rain Must Fall, there is a major and totally neglected weakness in this film from a Horton Foote play that troubles one's mind throughout the picture and leaves one sadly let-down at the end. It is the failure of the screenwriter--Mr. Foote himself--to clarify why the object of the woman's deep affection is as badly mixed-up as he is and why the woman, who seems a sensible person, doesn't make a single move to straighten him out...Granting that the wife is astonished and distressingly mystified at the neurotic behavior of her husband, this doesn't mean that the viewer is satisfied to be kept in the dark as to the reasons for the stark and macabre goings-on...As it is, we only see that these two people are frustrated and heart-broken by something that's bigger than the both of them. But we don't know what it is."

The staff at Variety wrote that the film's chief assets were "outstanding performances by its stars and an emotional punch that lingers...Other cast members are adequate, but roles suffer from editorial cuts (confirmed by director) that leave sub-plots dangling."

== See also ==
- List of American films of 1965
