= Red Grammer =

American singer and songwriter (born 1952)

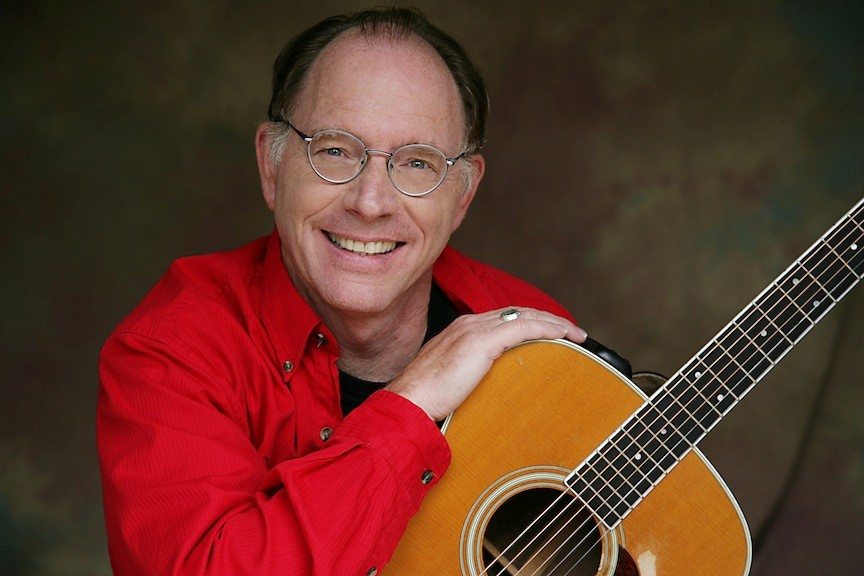
- Grammer in 2007

Background information
- Born: Robert Crane Grammer; November 28, 1952 (age 73); East Orange, New Jersey, United States
- Genres: Children's, folk
- Occupations: Singer; songwriter
- Instrument: Guitar • vocals
- Years active: 1981–present
- Labels: Smilin' Atcha Music; DBA Red Note Records
- Spouse: Kathy Willoughby Grammer
- Website: redgrammer.com

Robert Crane "Red" Grammer (born November 28, 1952) is an American singer and songwriter.

== Life and career ==
The East Orange, New Jersey native started college as a pre-med student at Rutgers, but he transferred to Beloit College in Wisconsin, where he received a Bachelor of Arts degree in music in 1975. After several years of performing as a solo artist, he became a member of the folk group The Limeliters, replacing Glenn Yarborough. He was the guitar-playing lead tenor with the group from 1981 to 1988.

Grammer is best known for his music for children, having recorded songs made up for his young sons. His songs teach human values including truthfulness, gratitude, integrity, kindness, and fairness. His most famous child is Andy Grammer. His album Be Bop Your Best was nominated in the 2005 Grammy Awards for Best Musical Album for Children. cELLAbration: A Tribute to Ella Jenkins, won a Grammy Award on which Red was a featured performer.

Teaching Peace, named by the All Music Guide as “one of the top five children's recordings of all time”, was the recipient of a rare Parents' Choice Classic Award. Though it did not win any awards the year it was released, it is now considered one of Grammer's best albums.

Other albums for children include: "Circle of Light: Songs for Bucket Fillers", Hello World, Down the Do-Re-Mi, Can You Sound Just Like Me? and "Red Grammer's Favorite Sing-along Songs." Albums for adults are Soul Man in a Techno World and Free Falling.

Grammer has performed in every state in the U.S. as well as in 22 other countries around the world, including China, Russia, Ukraine, and Israel.

He is often a keynote speaker and performer at national and regional educational conferences in the United States and Canada.

Grammer is a member of the Baháʼí Faith.

He met his first wife, Kathy, when they were students at Beloit College. They have two children, including pop singer Andy Grammer.

== Discography ==
=== Children’s ===
- Can You Sound Just Like Me? (1983)
- Teaching Peace (1986) One of the top five children's recordings of all time by All Music Guide
- Down the Do Re Mi (1991) Best Children's Recording of 1991 Pulse Magazine
- Red Grammer's Favorite Sing-Along Songs (1993) Early Childhood News Director's Choice Award
- Hello World (1995) USA Today Kid Pick, Early Childhood News Director's Choice Award, NAIRD Award
- Bebop Your Best (2005) Grammy Nominated
- cELLAbration: A Tribute to Ella Jenkins (2005) (Featured artist) Grammy Award for Best Musical Album For Children, 2005
- "Circle of Light: Songs for Bucket Fillers" (2014)

=== Adult ===
- Free Falling (1993)
- Soul Man in a Techno World (2001)
- Alive in Concert Vols. 1 and 2 (recorded with The Limeliters)
- Harmony (recorded with The Limeliters)
- Singing for the Fun (recorded with The Limeliters)

=== Children's DVD ===
- Red Grammer Live in Concert: Hooray for the World (2003)

== Books ==
- Everybody Up and Stars ESL series-(Oxford University Press Music)
- Teaching Peace Songbook and Teacher's Guide (Red Note Records)
- Great Railway Adventure Series (Learning Curve Co.- read-along books: music)
- Rainforest, Antarctica, Beaver at Long Pond, Box Turtle at Long Pond-(Soundprints- read-along books: music and narration)
