= The Limeliters =

American folk music group

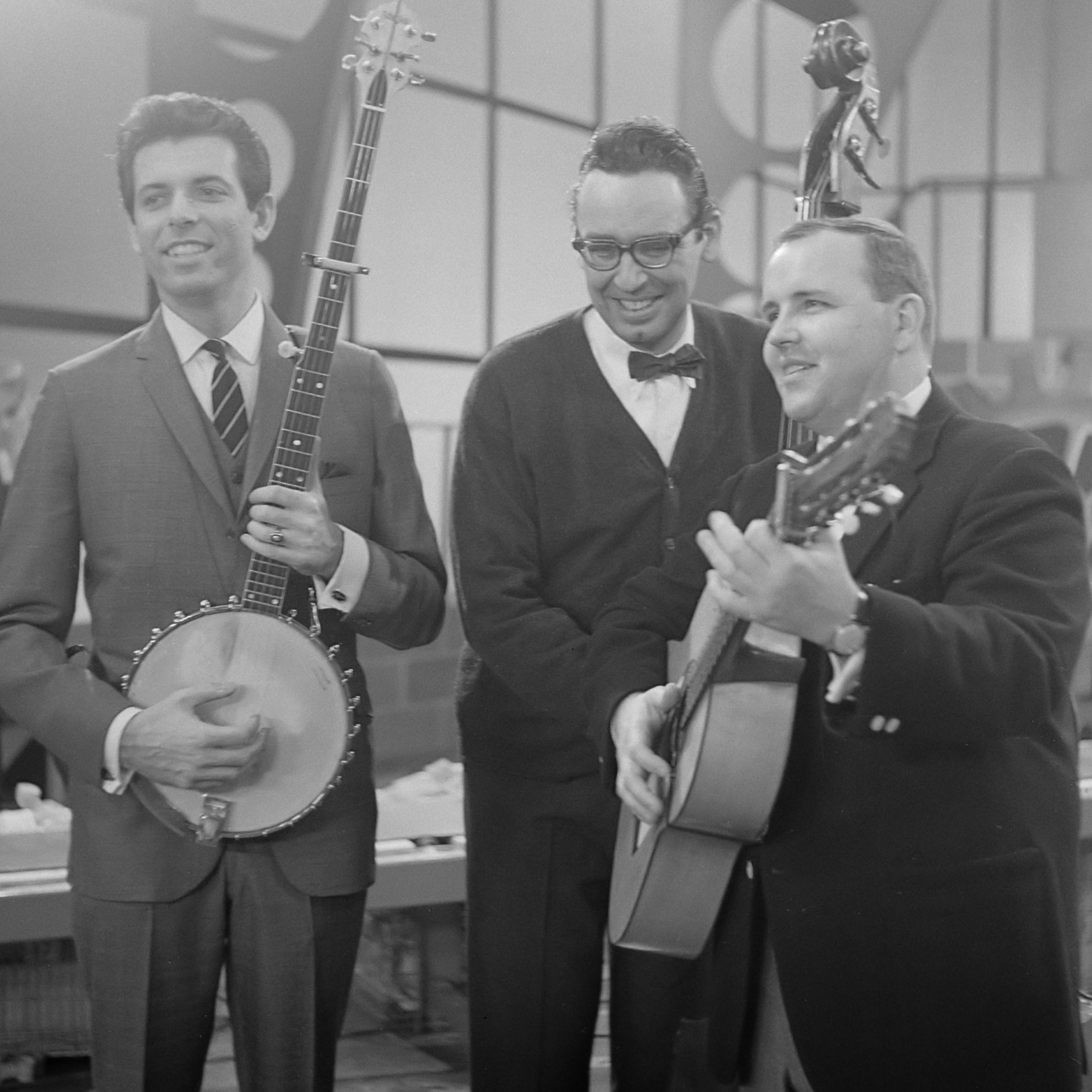
- The Limeliters (1963)

Background information
- Origin: Los Angeles, California; United States
- Genres: Folk, roots
- Years active: 1959–1965, 1981–present
- Labels: Elektra, RCA Victor, Warner Bros., Stax, Essex, GNP, Folk Era, Brass Dolphin, West Knoll, Taragon/BMG
- Members: Daniel Boling; Steve Brooks; Andy Corwin
- Past members: Alex Hassilev; Darcie Deaville; Lou Gottlieb; Glenn Yarbrough; Ernie Sheldon; Red Grammer; Rick Dougherty; Bill Zorn; Mack Bailey; John David; Geoffrey Pike; Roger McGuinn; Gaylan Taylor; Don Marovich
- Website: Limeliters official site

The Limeliters are an American folk music group, formed in July 1959 by Lou Gottlieb (double bass / low baritone), Alex Hassilev (banjo, guitar / low baritone), and Glenn Yarbrough (guitar / tenor). The group was active from 1959 until 1965, and then after a hiatus of sixteen years, Yarbrough, Hassilev, and Gottlieb reunited and began performing again as The Limeliters in reunion tours. On a regular basis, a continuation of The Limeliters group is still active and performing. Gottlieb died in 1996 (aged 72), Yarbrough died in 2016 (aged 86), and Hassilev died in 2024 (aged 91). Hassilev, the last founding member, who had remained active in the group, retired in 2006, leaving the group to carry on without any of the original members.

== Origins ==
Gottlieb performed with the Gateway Singers in the mid-1950s but moved to California to complete his PhD in musicology. Later when he was working as an arranger for the Kingston Trio, Gottlieb was in the audience one night when Alex Hassilev and Glenn Yarbrough appeared on stage to sing a duet together at the Cosmo Alley Coffee Shop in Hollywood. Gottlieb originally suggested that the three of them work together to arrange some material for the Kingston Trio, but they discovered their voices blended well and decided to try to get work on the folk circuit. Journalist John Puccio wrote: "They had the uncanny knack of making three voices sound like six...and thanks to their velvet harmonies, making a trio sound like a choir."

They went to Aspen, Colorado, to work at a club called "The Limelite", which Yarbrough and Hassilev had purchased after singing there during the previous ski season. After a short period of perfecting their act, they set off for the "hungry i" in San Francisco, which at the time was the California nerve center for the mushrooming contemporary folk movement. The owner had just had a group with three long names strung together and was not about to put "Yarbrough, Hassilev, and Gottlieb" up on the marquee. But the group had not yet decided on a name. They chose "The Limeliters".

After a strong showing at the hungry i, the Limeliters signed with Elektra Records and released their first self-titled album in 1960, and later signed with RCA Victor. The trio's first album for RCA Victor, Tonight in Person, was recorded live at the Ash Grove in Hollywood and reached number five on the Billboard album chart. Writing in the All Music Guide, Cary Ginell noted, "this album is a winner all the way and one of the shining examples of the best of the urban folk revival of the early '60s".

The reissue in 1961 of their earlier Elektra album made the top 40 and spent 18 weeks on the chart. Their third release, The Slightly Fabulous Limeliters, made the top ten in the same year, charting for 36 weeks. Another album with staying power was one of folk songs for children of all ages, Through Children's Eyes. It remained charted for 29 weeks and peaked at number 25. Although they did not have a true chart-topping hit record at the time, they were well known for their repertoire of rousing songs, including such as "There's a Meetin' Here Tonight," "City of New Orleans," "A Dollar Down" (their only charting single, peaking at number 60 in 1961), "Have Some Madeira M'Dear," "Lonesome Traveler," "Wabash Cannonball," "Whiskey in the Jar," and many others which are performed on their more than 25 record albums and in their concerts.

The Limeliters featured in a number of television commercials, including their rendition of the jingle "Things Go Better with Coke," which became a national hit, and other commercial work for L&M cigarettes. The group also toured extensively with a range of performers, including stand-up comic Mort Sahl and jazz singer Chris Connor, and made appearances on the TV show Hootenanny. Gottlieb recalled that "we were singing for Coca-Cola...the record royalties were good...so it was a very profitable thing." At this time, their personal appearances totaled more than 300 performances a year.

In 1963, the Limeliters recorded songs for the John Wayne film, McLintock!, released later that year.

The group's career nearly came to an end in 1962 when they suffered a plane crash in Provo, Utah, while on tour.

== The Limeliters break up ==
Yarbrough left the group in 1963. Gottlieb and Hassilev continued the Limeliters but only as a recording act, recruiting former Gateway Singers tenor Ernie Sheldon as Yarbrough's replacement. Sheldon wrote the lyrics for what became Yarbrough's biggest solo hit, "Baby the Rain Must Fall."

When the trio's RCA Victor contract expired in 1965, Gottlieb and Hassilev formally retired the act. By then, Yarbrough was a successful soloist on records and in concert. Hassilev became a producer with his own recording studio and pressing plant, while Gottlieb headed the Morningstar Commune on a ranch he purchased near San Francisco.

The group re-formed briefly in 1968 to record an album for Warner Bros. Records.

== The Limeliters return ==
During the 1970s, the Limeliters embarked on a series of yearly reunion tours with Yarbrough, who said early [that] "the one prerequisite for the reunion...was that it be brief". The intention was for the tours to get shorter each year because the group had other interests and were tired of touring. Yarbrough wanted to do more sailing, Gottlieb had established a commune in Maui and Hassilev, with his own recording studio, was planning on doing some producing. Yarbrough said that a vacation between tours resulted in more excitement for them as performers, and concerts that were mostly sold out showed they still had a lot of support from their fans. While on tour, the group came into the CBS television studio in Vancouver, "picked up instruments supplied for them by the network, spent perhaps 90 seconds tuning them...then, pure and simple, flawless, just as if someone had put a record on, out came There's a Meetin' Here Tonight". One review of a 1975 reunion concert noted that the audience, which appeared to be middle-aged old fans, gave "vigorous applause [to] the opening bars of the old hits", and concluded that while "nostalgia...was a little more prominent than vocal skills...the Limeliters still have a lot of the old magic".

Stax Records released a reunion recording in 1974, and in 1976, the group released two concert albums on their own Brass Dolphin Records. These were so successful that in 1981, Hassilev and Gottlieb decided to reform the group and get them back into the mainstream of entertainment. With the addition of tenor Red Grammer and John David they again began performing. Around 1981 they were joined by multi-instrumentalist Fred Sokolow and pianist Jay Snyder. This iteration of the group did a month-long tour of Israel.

After eight productive years, Grammer left the group to pursue a solo career as a children's artist. In 1990, he was replaced by another tenor, Rick Dougherty, whose wide-ranging musical background and bright stage presence brought a fresh dimension to the group.

After Gottlieb's death in 1996, Bill Zorn, a former Kingston Trio member, took over his high baritone role.

In 2003, Zorn and Dougherty left the group to join The Kingston Trio (until 2017), and in early 2004, tenor Mack Bailey and comedian baritone Andy Corwin joined the group. In 2006, Hassilev retired and left the band. Soon afterward, Gaylan Taylor joined in 2006. In 2012, Don Marovich joined up with the Limeliters, but in 2019 he joined the Kingston Trio.

Glenn Yarbrough died from complications of dementia in Nashville, Tennessee, on August 11, 2016, at the age of 86.

== Impact on the music scene ==
The Limeliters have been described as a folk group who managed to "successfully integrate smooth harmonies, light political satire and general humor into a national spotlight...[and]...at a time when popular music was beginning to gain an edge, the music of the Limeliters portrayed a simpler, jollier America where educated wisecracks and sing-alongs could suffice as entertainment." Another music critic said that the group was unique because their individual vocal talents were never lost while singing together and Gottlieb as MC, [peppered] "the act with scholarly witticisms, wry asides, and zany non sequiturs." It has been noted that the Limeliters were recognized more for albums than singles and became widely known after their shift to RCA Victor, which resulted in many of their successful albums.

Reviewing a performance by the group in 1981, Harry Sumrall in The Washington Post said [that] "a strong gust of musical nostalgia blew into town last night, straight out of the hootenanny days of the early '60s...[and]...there are those cantankerous, persnickety souls who would say that '60s folk was the nadir of American music - and they would be right. But folk is also entertaining and downright fun. And in both senses, the Limeliters were true to the style."

Journalist T.W. McGarry observed in the Los Angeles Times that in 1985 the Limeliters were still the biggest names to appear in a series of Sunday night folk concerts called Bound for Glory. However, there was a time when no "100-seat lounge, like the bar at the Sportsmen's Lodge, could afford to book the trio, one of the most popular groups in the heyday of folk music in the late 1950s and early '60s." In the same article, Gottlieb was quoted as saying (with regard to folk music), "If there is a common denominator in this music, it is that it is primarily acoustic, with almost no electrically amplified instruments, and 80% of it was composed by the performers." The Limeliters were contemporaries of the Kingston Trio in their style and level of popularity and were one of the top touring college acts in America that "helped mold the folk style and genre for a generation." In 2015, Andy Corwin told the Kokomo Tribune that the vocal harmonies and sense of humor of the group had not changed and live performances were like a party to which the audience was invited. He noted that "we do this because we love it and love passing the music on... a continuation of an act that’s been around for 56 years. The comedy we throw in is intended to keep things lively and moving along."

In 2021, it was noted that for over fifty years, the Limeliters had entertained "standing-room-only crowds with their incredible musical talent and zany sense of humor...[and]... with different configurations over the years, the group has preserved their signature vocal sound", and were still regarded as one of the most "exciting and entertaining vocal acts touring the country."

== Discography ==
=== Albums ===
- 1960 — The Limeliters [Later re-released as Their First Historic Album]—Elektra
- 1961 — Tonight: In Person — RCA Victor (Live)
- 1961 — The Slightly Fabulous Limeliters — RCA Victor (Live)
- 1962 — Sing Out! — RCA Victor
- 1962 — Through Children's Eyes (Little-Folk Songs for Adults) — RCA Victor (Live)
- 1962 — Folk Matinee — RCA Victor
- 1963 — Makin' a Joyful Noise — RCA Victor
- 1963 — Our Men in San Francisco — RCA Victor (Live)
- 1963 — Fourteen 14K Folk Songs — RCA Victor (Studio album)
- 1964 — More of Everything! — RCA Victor (Studio album)
- 1965 — Leave It to the Limeliters — RCA Victor (Studio album)
- 1965 — Limeliters Look at Love in Depth — RCA Victor
- 1965 — London Concert — RCA Victor (Live, recorded in 1963)
- 1968 — Time to Gather Seeds — Warner Bros. (Studio album)
- 1968 — Those Were the Days — RCA Victor (Studio album)
- 1974 — Reunion - Glenn Yarbrough and The Limeliters — Stax
- 1976 — Reunion, Vol. 1 — Brass Dolphin
- 1976 — Reunion, Vol. 2 — Brass Dolphin
- 1977 — Pure Gold — RCA
- 1982 — Alive in Concert, Vol. 1 — GNP (Live)
- 1985 — Alive in Concert, Vol. 2 — GNP (Live)
- 1987 — Best of the Limeliters — (RCA Special Products).
- 1987 — Harmony! — West Knoll (Live)
- 1989 — Potpourri — West Knoll
- 1990 — Singing for the Fun — GNP
- 1990 — A Mighty Day! — West Knoll
- 1991 — Joy Across the Land — West Knoll (Live)
- 1992 — Global Carnival — West Knoll
- 1999 — Until We Get it Right — Limeliter Productions
- 2000 — The Complete RCA Singles Collection — Taragon/RCA/BMG
- 2000 — The Chicago Tapes - First Set August 13, 1976 Concert — Folk Era (Live)
- 2000 — The Chicago Tapes - Second Set August 14, 1976 Concert — Folk Era (Live)
- 2004 — Live In Paradise — Limeliter Productions
- 2007 — Right From the Start — (CDBaby)

=== Compilations and box sets ===
- 1964 — Best of the Limeliters [RCA Victor] — RCA — Mix
- 1993 — Best of the Limeliters [Essex] — Essex
- 1996 — Two Classic Albums from the Limeliters: The Fabulous Limeliters and Sing Out!
- 1997 — 36 All-Time Greatest Hits (3-CD Set)' — RCA/BMG
- 2000 — Two Classic Albums from the Limeliters: Our Men in San Francisco and London Concert

=== Singles ===
- "The Hammer Song" b/w "Charlie, The Midnight Marauder"; Elektra EKSN-45-8
- "A Dollar Down" b/w "When Twice the Moon Has Come and Gone"; RCA Victor 47-7859 (with picture sleeve)
- "A Hundred Years Ago" b/w "Paco Peco"; RCA Victor 47-7913
- "Red Roses and White Wine" b/w "Milk and Honey" (from the Broadway musical Milk and Honey); RCA Victor 47–7942.
  - This 45 was also commercially issued as RCA Victor Compact 33 Single 37–7942; it was a 7" vinyl record but played at 33 rpm.
- "Just an Honest Mistake" (from the production "Let it Ride") b/w "Jonah"; RCA Victor 47-7966
- "I Had a Mule" b/w "The Riddle Song"; RCA Victor 47-8069
- "Who Will Buy?" (from the Broadway musical Oliver) b/w "Funk"; RCA Victor 47-8094 (with picture sleeve)
- "The Midnight Special" b/w "McLintock's Theme (Love In The Country)" from the U.A. Badjac Production "McLintock", RCA Victor 47-8255
- "No Man is an Island" b/w "A Casinha Pequenina (Little House)"; RCA Victor 47-8361
- "Rose" b/w "Seventeen Wives"; RCA Victor 47-8535
- "A Hundred Men" b/w "Cold December (In Your Heart)"; Warner Bros.-Seven Arts Records 7177 (credited to "The Limeliters with Glenn Yarbrough")
- "Time to Gather Seeds" b/w "The Importance of The Rose"; Warner Bros.-Seven Arts Records 7254
- "Consider It Done" b/w "A Pound of Peaches" (Summer's Here); Morningstar MSR-1 (with picture sleeve reading "The Limeliters spring 1973; The Limeliters spring 1963") (#73 CAN)
- "I See America" b/w "Holy Creation"; STAX Records 0185 (credited to Glenn Yarbrough)
- "American Tour" b/w "Right From the Start"; West Knoll Records WK-1001
- "Beautiful Fantasy" b/w "Heart Full of Love"; West Knoll Records WK-1002
