= Morningstar Commune =

Commune in California, United States

Coordinates: 38.41841°N 122.91366°W

Morningstar Commune (also known as Morning Star Ranch and The Digger Farm) was an active open land counterculture commune in rural Sonoma County, California, located at 12542 Graton Road near Occidental.

== History ==
In 1966, Lou Gottlieb, a member of the folk group The Limeliters, purchased 31 acres of land in Sonoma County, north of San Francisco. That same year, composer Ramon Sender and several artists associated with the San Francisco counterculture moved onto the property, initially using it as a rural retreat.

In 1967, Gottlieb opened the land to all comers under the principle “Land Access To Which Is Denied No One” (LATWIDNO), a term he coined to describe the ranch and similar communal experiments. The property became known as Morning Star. It attracted members of San Francisco's Haight-Ashbury Diggers and became part of the circuit of young people travelling between San Francisco's Haight-Ashbury district and Sebastopol, California. According to later accounts, the commune preached that “if you told no one to leave, the land (the vibes) selected the people who lived on it.”

By mid to late 1967, Morning Star functioned as an open, anarchic commune with no formal membership, rules, or limits on residency. Hundreds of people visited on weekends, with a smaller group living full-time in makeshift shelters. The site lacked formal sanitation systems, electricity, and building permits. Neighbours complained about noise, nudity, waste disposal, and public health conditions.

In 1968, Sonoma County authorities issued injunctions against habitation on the land, citing zoning, sanitation, and “organised camp” violations. Residents were repeatedly arrested for sleeping on the property, and county crews bulldozed shelters.

In October 1968, Gottlieb appeared before the Sonoma County Board of Supervisors and offered the land to the county as “an experiment in living”. The proposal was rejected. In 1969, he transferred ownership of the property to “God” through a recorded deed, arguing in court that the land should exist outside economic ownership. Courts rejected the deed, upheld county enforcement actions, and legal disputes continued through 1969 and 1970. Gottlieb accumulated fines and was jailed for one week on contempt charges. His fines ultimately exceeded $14,000. County authorities bulldozed structures on the property on three occasions, at Gottlieb’s expense.

As enforcement intensified from 1969 onward, many residents, including families and women, relocated to a nearby property established by Bill Wheeler, commonly known as Wheeler’s Ranch. It operated on similar open-access principles but with somewhat greater structure. Both Morning Star and Wheeler’s Ranch were subject to inspections and enforcement by county health officials and sheriff’s departments. The ranch existed in its open-access form from 1967 to the early 1970s and remained a regular gathering place for travellers from the Haight. Sonoma County eventually imposed a permanent injunction forbidding anyone except Gottlieb’s family from living on the property. Sustained legal action and repeated clearances effectively ended habitation at both Morning Star and Wheeler’s Ranch by the early 1970s. Morning Star had ceased to exist as a functioning commune by 1973.

Morning Star and Wheeler’s Ranch formed part of a wider North Bay network of communes, which included Olompali in Marin County, where members of the Grateful Dead lived communally in 1966, and the short-lived Chosen Family commune that followed there. By the mid-1970s, county-level crackdowns in Sonoma and Marin, using zoning, health, and building regulations, had dismantled most open-access communes in the region.

In 1969, some former commune members moved to Taos County, New Mexico, where the settlement was later turned into a farm. This site became informally known as Morning Star East.

During the 1970s, when The Limeliters reunited, their autobiographical song “Acres of Limeliters” referred to Gottlieb’s activities during the hiatus, including the lyric: “. . .while Lou played Executive Hippie at his Morningstar groupie rest home!”

In later decades, “Morningstar” became the name of one of the residences at Twin Oaks Community in Virginia, where buildings are named after defunct communes. Ramon Sender continued to document the history of the Free Land movement and Morning Star by compiling oral history interviews, later published as “Home Free Home”.

== In media ==
T. C. Boyle's 2003 novel Drop City tells the fictional account of a commune with many qualities in common with Morningstar.

In 2008, a play written about the Morningstar Commune premiered in California.
