= Glenn Yarbrough =

American folk singer and musician (1930–2016)

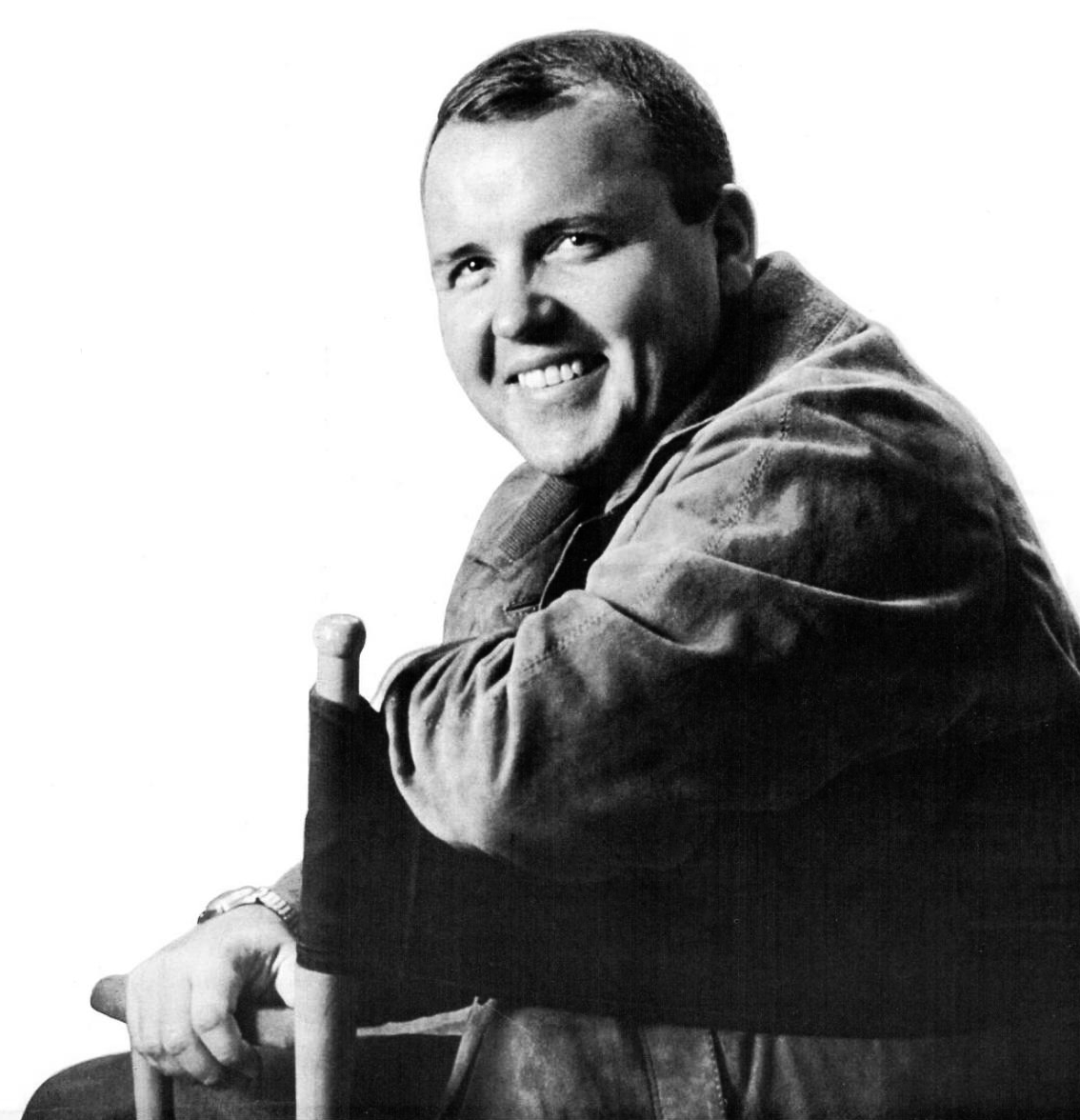
- Yarbrough in 1965

Background information
- Born: Glenn Robertson Yarbrough; January 12, 1930; Milwaukee, Wisconsin, U.S.
- Died: August 11, 2016 (aged 86) Nashville, Tennessee, U.S.
- Genres: Folk
- Occupations: Singer; musician
- Instruments: Vocals; guitar
- Years active: 1951–2010
- Label: RCA Victor
- Formerly of: The Limeliters

Glenn Robertson Yarbrough (January 12, 1930 – August 11, 2016) was an American folk singer and guitarist. He was the tenor lead singer of the Limeliters from 1959 to 1963 and also had a prolific solo career. Yarbrough's dissatisfaction with the music industry led him to question his priorities, and he later focused on sailing and setting up a school for orphans.

== Early life ==
Glenn Yarbrough was born in Milwaukee on January 12, 1930, later moving to New York where his parents were practicing social workers. However, because there were few jobs available during the Great Depression, his father traveled around the country from one job to another, and Yarbrough lived with his mother in New York City, helping to support her as a paid boy soprano in the Choir of Men and Boys at Grace Church in Manhattan.

He was offered a scholarship at St. Paul's School, located in Brooklandville, Maryland, graduating in 1948. After a year travelling around the US, Canada and Mexico, he enrolled in college at St. John's College in Annapolis, Maryland, where his roommate was Jac Holzman, later the founder of Elektra Records. Yarbrough said that initially Holzman had wanted to call the label Elektra-Stratford Records, but "I suggested Elektra Records because it was a little shorter, and that's what we went with: Elektra Records".

When Woody Guthrie performed an impromptu performance for the roommates, Yarbrough became interested in folk music and learned the guitar. Holzman later recorded Here We Go Baby, (also known as Songs by Glenn Yarbrough) an early solo album by Yarbrough in 1957. Greg Adams noted that the album was "ahead of the game in terms of combining pop and folk music" and while not a success commercially was "an entertaining and fascinating artifact from the pre-dawn of the folk boom". The album was also described in the liner notes as a departure from the more traditional folk music on the Elektra label and a "showcase to highlight and display [Yarbrough's] virtuosity...undertaken for the sake of an unusual talent". Yarbrough was approached by Fred Hellerman and asked if Pete Seeger could play the banjo on some tracks, and this put Yarbrough in touch with the politics of the McCarthyism era of blacklists of musicians. However, Yarbrough was disappointed with Seeger's attitude and quality of work, leading him to replace Seeger on the record with Erik Darling, also formerly of The Weavers.

Yarbrough served in the U.S. Army during the Korean War, initially deciphering codes and later with the entertainment corps. After military service, he moved to South Dakota to help his father run a square dance barn and started appearing on local television shows. In the mid-1950s, Albert Grossman, an impresario who ran the Gate of Horn, a small folk club in Chicago, booked Yarbrough for a two-week engagement. Here he developed some of the most important relationships of his career with artists like Odetta and Shel Silverstein.

== The Limeliters ==
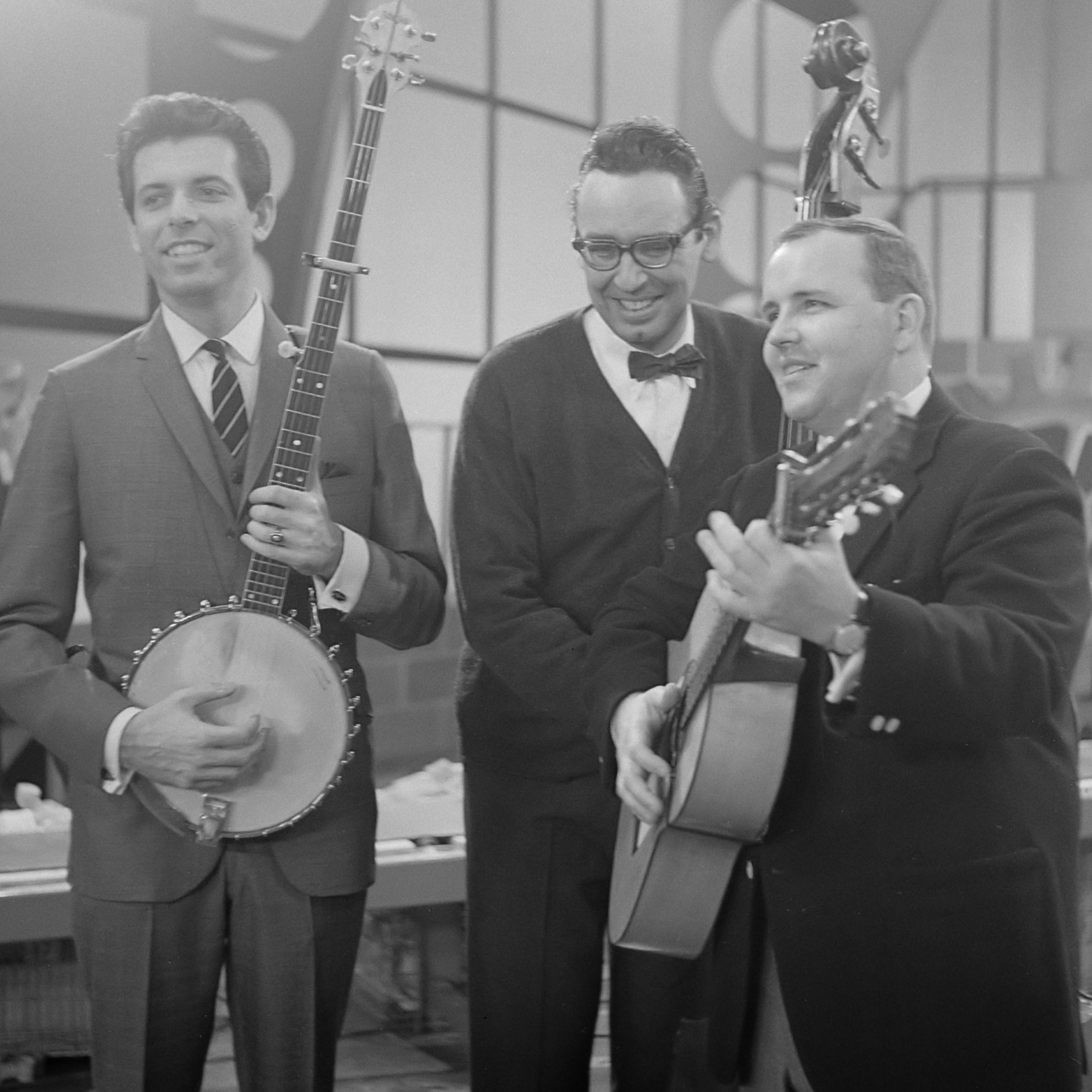
The Limeliters (1963)

By the late 1950s, Yarbrough had moved to Aspen, Colorado, and purchased a small nightclub called The Limelite. When Yarbrough was performing with Alex Hassilev at the Cosmo Alley coffeeshop in Hollywood in 1959, they impressed pianist and arranger Lou Gottlieb, who was working at the time on arrangements for the Kingston Trio. Gottlieb suggested that the three of them work together. When they discovered that their voices blended well, they began playing on the folk circuit. "They had the uncanny knack of making three voices sound like six," wrote John Puccio in Sensible Sound, "and thanks to their velvet harmonies making a trio sound like a choir". They named themselves the Limeliters after the club owned by Yarbrough. A journalist described Yarbrough as possessing "one of the purest, most exquisite voices on the planet".

In 1960, the Limeliters recorded their first album on the Elektra label. In 1961, the trio had signed with RCA Victor for their second album, Tonight: In Person, which reached No. 5 on the Billboard charts, where it stayed for 74 weeks. Between 1961 and 1963, the Limeliters "made appearances on television, sang on commercials and embarked on an exhausting touring schedule that saw them perform as many as 310 days out of each year." It was claimed that in 1963, the Limeliters "broke the Hungry I's all-time attendance record and the lines to get into the club, snaked all the way around the block".

As a lyric tenor and guitarist, Yarbrough contributed to the success of the Limeliters as they performed "an extensive repertoire of traditional and contemporary songs...[touring]...extensively throughout the U.S...[and]...releasing nearly a dozen albums for RCA Victor". The Limeliters were known for their "burnished tight harmonies, sophisticated if nontraditional arrangements and witty onstage banter...[with]...Yarbrough's silvery tenor...the group's acoustic linchpin".

On December 12, 1962, a plane the Limeliters had chartered crashed in Utah. While everybody survived, Yarbrough had a head injury, was shaken by the experience, and began to "reassess his priorities". He did leave the Limeliters shortly thereafter, noting in an interview that he had lost interest in folk music and "got tired of the three chord songs...[and]...by that time people were beginning to write things like Rod McKuen's work".

== Solo career ==
As well as the folk-oriented 1957 solo record Here We Go, Baby, Yarbrough made other albums before joining the Limeliters. The sleeve notes of the 1957 record Come and Sit by My Side, noted that Yarbrough brought "folk music up to date, sings in a manner that modern listeners will understand and appreciate...[a]...novel, youthful approach to the old songs". In 1958 he made an album with Marilyn Child. Robert Sherman said "both of these vital, young performers [had] dramatic, highly personal styles, yet their voices and delivery are perfectly suited to each other".

After leaving the Limeliters, Yarbrough had intended to sail around the world, but while making plans for this, appeared as a guitar player in a November 1964 episode of Wagon Train. He did purchase a boat, but was persuaded by RCA Victor to postpone his trip and begin recording his first solo album, Time to Move On, released in 1964; the album was viewed by one reviewer as [setting] "the tone for the rest of his career: light acoustic arrangements, songs from an eclectic array of sources, and vibrato-laden vocals...falling somewhere between pop and folk". Jason Verlinde, a music journalist and co-founder of the Fretboard Journal compared Yarbrough's smooth tenor voice on this record to "the mighty seas that gave this legendary folksinger a case of wanderlust – occasionally rough but always beautiful and strong". "Baby the Rain Must Fall", the title song of the 1965 film of the same name made it to No. 12 on the singles chart, making it his biggest hit. An LP, also called Baby the Rain Must Fall, hit No. 35 on the albums chart.

In 1966, Yarbrough reflecting on his time with the Limeliters, said that it had all been "intellectual...[with]...Lou Gottlieb and Alex Hasseliv to sign autographs and be scintillating at after-show parties", but as a solo performer he needed to come to terms with more direct attention from his fans, even being regarded as a "sex symbol".

Yarbrough had a working relationship with Rod McKuen and by 1968 had recorded around 45 of his songs. He later recalled in an interview that he had no memory of the first McKuen song he recorded, but said that he was thanked by the balladeer and they became close friends.

Solo performances were generally well received. Writing in the Fort Worth Star-Telegram in 1967 after a performance at the Texas Woman's University campus in Denton, Texas, Lani Presswood described Yarbrough's voice "as one of those rare, unmistakable things...[with]...a lyrical quality which makes you think of a spring breeze rippling a field of ankle-deep clover". Following a concert at Coe College, Iowa, in 1969, a reviewer described the performance as professional, concluding that "Glenn Yarbrough puts on a worthwhile show. The audience paid three dollars apiece and got about five dollars worth of entertainment." In September 1970, Yarbrough performed at the Saskatchewan Center of the Arts. He was said to be in full control, with an electric warmth, a "vibrancy that sweeps over the audience and envelopes it", even succeeding in doing material that involved audience participation, seen by the reviewer as "one of the riskiest tricks in show business".

By 1972, Yarbrough was voicing dissatisfaction with the entertainment industry, later commenting that he never sang to meet people's expectations, had "mixed feelings about stardom" and saw money as "pain in the ass just to take care of." In an interview in 1983, Yarbrough acknowledged that while he didn't care much for the music business, the decision had to be made sometimes to perform to earn money, concluding:

I used to think singing was something you do for money. As I get older, I believe it's why I am here. It's my talent and it's what I should do. In an industrial society...music is what people need...[and despite misgivings about the industry, maintained enthusasiam]... we do some of the old songs, but not too many, because I live to move.

Yarbrough provided vocals for the Rankin/Bass animated versions of The Hobbit (1977) and The Return of the King (1980), singing "Frodo of the Nine Fingers".

In 1980 Yarbrough introduced what one journalist described as "his new sound", with less upbeat ballads and more mellow tunes, due in part to a case of strep throat at the time. In the same article Yarbrough noted that he was getting a lot of resistance from major records companies for his new album Changing Force, which they said had no hits. Yarbrough explained the album was composed of "rock ballads", and while noting that his music at the time was commercial, he stressed it was more than just "old stuff" and definitely not nostalgia, as he "liked to move ahead".

While it was not a reunion, Yarbrough did appear on the same bill as the Limeliters at the Sacramento Community Center in August 1982. He said on stage that it felt bizarre to be watching the Limeliters standing backstage, noting "it is an object lesson, if you think you cannot be replaced in this world". Alex Hassilev said after the concert that the Limeliters had chosen some of their set to fit with the "mood of Yarbrough's", and included material that was gentle with less of a comic focus.

Yarbrough had said that he "hated Christmas music", but after reading The Forgotten Carols which gave him "chills up and down [his] spine" and brought him to tears, he was inspired to tour performing Utah composer Michael McLean's Forgotten Carols and creating a CD of the show. Yarbrough's attitude to Christmas was said to be related to his childhood when his parents often could not afford to bring him home for the holidays and he spent a lot of time alone. He told Michael McLean that Christmas was never interesting to him, but the composer's reply to Yarbrough was that his voice was God-given and he wanted it to be used to sing his music. Yarbrough credited McLean for helping him "rediscover Christmas...and Christmas for helping him rediscover his heart". The show involved Yarbrough doing both the narration and music, taking the role of a 2000-year-old man who tells the story "to help people open their hearts to the true significance of Christmas".

He protested against the Vietnam War, claiming that it "had attacked the moral fiber of our country" and noted that after a performance of a protest song at the U.S. Air Force Academy, the audience applauded.

== Interest in sailing ==
He had originally planned to do a movie on sailing, an area of special interest to Yarbrough not just because of a personal sense of awe of "waves 40 to 50 feet above you in a storm", but also as it provided the opportunity to get away from being "bombarded...[as consumers]...by the media and the big corporations". One journalist said that Yarbrough's love of sailing reflected the fact that while he had been successful in the entertainment industry, "he saw through to the bottom of that illusory world, its temporary nature, its phoniness".

As an avid sailor, Yarbrough took many cruises on his 45-foot boat the Armorel and felt very attracted to staying in New Zealand, a country he described as having "the perfect form of government for a country its size...[and was]...almost like the United States must have been at the turn of the century". After divorcing his first wife Peggy Goodhart in 1964 and marrying Annie Graves, Yarbrough spent five years on a 57-foot boat that he had built. As a result of requests from promoters at the time for the Limeliters to re-form, Yarbrough joined them for a reunion concert at Chicago's Orchestra Hall to a sold-out audience in 1973. The group stayed together until 1981, after which Yarbrough spent most of the next twenty years on his boat, only returning to record and give concerts when necessary to finance his sailing. One review of a reunion concert at the Cocoanut Grove in 1976 said that with "Yarbrough on guitar along with his lugubrious vibratoed vocal instrument", the sound of the Limeliters was intact, concluding that their harmonies meant they remained "one of the best sounds around, untouched by age or fashion".

In January 1993, Yarbrough presented a programme of songs and a lecture at the Sailing Adventure Series at Orange Coast College. In a preview of the programme, the Los Angeles Times described Yarbrough as an "accomplished seaman...[with]...his new boat, a 34-foot junk rig...designed for single-handed cruising". In the same article, Yarbrough said sailing was both harder and "more frightening" than singing, but he still enjoyed the "give and take" with an audience, "communicating and touching people...but sailing is entirely different".

== Children's school ==
Yarbrough began raising funds to establish a school for orphans in the late 1960s and said at that point, it was the only reason he continued to perform. The school which was said to have needed an annual budget of $250,000 to operate was described at Yarbrough as taking "a very radical approach to learning...to learn something about education and what helps the mind retain information" After selling many of his expensive possessions including cars, a house in New Zealand and a banana plantation in Jamaica, Yarbrough eventually opened a school for disadvantaged youth in Los Angeles but it ran out of money and had to be closed down in the early 1970s. While unsuccessful, the school did reflect Yarbrough's desire to do something meaningful with his life to help families.

== Personal life ==
In the hope of saving his faltering singing voice, Yarbrough had elective surgery on his larynx in 2010. The surgery was unsuccessful, and he went into cardiac arrest while in the recovery room and was put on a ventilator. He survived, but began to suffer from dementia and never sang in public again. From that time, Yarbrough had to be cared for full time by his daughter, Holly Yarbrough Burnett, in Nashville and died there in 2016 from chronic obstructive pulmonary disease (COPD). Though he suffered from dementia in the last years of his life, according to Burnett, her father remained a "warm, happy man".

Yarbrough married four times. The first three mariages to Peggy Goodhart, Ann Graves and Laurie Ann Pool ended in divorce and at the time of his death, he was separated from his fourth wife Kathleen Pommer. Yarbrough is survived by his daughter Holly, two children from his first marriage, Stephany Yarbrough and Sean Yarbrough; two stepdaughters, Brooke and Heather, from his marriage to Poole; a grandson; and a great-grandson.

== Award nominations ==
Both as a solo singer and member of the Limeliters Yarbrough was nominated several times for Grammy Awards.

8th Annual Grammy Awards (1966) Nominated for:

- Best Vocal Performance Male: Baby the Rain Must Fall (Album)
- Best Contemporary (R&R) Single: Baby the Rain Must Fall (Single)

6th Annual Grammy Awards (1964) Nominated for:

- Best Gospel or Other Religious Recording (Musical): Makin' A Joyful Noise

5th Annual Grammy Awards (1963) Nominated for:

- Best Performance By A Vocal Group: Through Children's Eyes
- Best Recording for Children: Through Children's Eyes

4th Annual Grammy Awards (1962) Nominated for:

- Best Performance By a Vocal Group: The Slightly Fabulous Limeliters (Album)
- Best Folk Recording: The Slightly Fabulous Limeliters

== Discography ==
=== Albums ===
List of solo albums, with selected chart positions
Title	Album details	Peak chart positions
Title	Album details	US
Follow the Drinking Gourd/The Reaper's Ghost	Released: 1951; Label: Stratford Records	–
Come and Sit by My Side	Released: 1957; Label: Tradition Records	–
Songs By Glenn Yarbrough a.k.a. Here We Go Baby	Released: 1957; Label: Elektra Records	–
Marilyn Child and Glenn Yarbrough Sing Folk Songs	Released: 1958; Label: Elektra Records	–
Time to Move On	Released: 1964; Label: RCA Victor	–
One More Round	Released: 1964; Label: RCA Victor	142
Come Share My Life	Released: 1965; Label: RCA Victor	112
Baby The Rain Must Fall	Released: 1965; Label: RCA Victor	35
It's Gonna Be Fine	Released: 1965; Label: RCA Victor	75
The Lonely Things	Released: 1966; Label: RCA Victor	61
Live at the Hungry I	Released: 1966; Label: RCA Victor	85
Honey and Wine	Released: 1967; Label: RCA Victor	141
The Bitter and the Sweet	Released: 1967; Label: RCA Victor	–
For Emily, Whenever I May Find Her	Released: 1967; Label: RCA Victor	159
Let the World Go By	Released: 1968; Label: RCA Victor	–
We Survived the Madness	Released: 1968; Label: RCA Victor	–
Looking Back	Released: 1969; Label: Everest Records	
Each of Us Alone	Released: 1969; Label: Warner Bros. Records	18
Somehow, Someway; Yarbrough Country	Released: 1969; Label: Warner Bros. Records	–
Glenn Yarbrough Sings the Rod McKuen Songbook	Released: 1969; Label: Warner Bros. Records	189
Let Me Choose Life	Released: 1970; Label: Warner Bros. Records	–
Jubilee; The Best of Glenn Yarbrough	Released: 1970; Label: Warner Bros. Records	–
Bend Down & Touch Me	Released: 1971; Label: Warner Bros. Records	–
My Sweet Lady	Released: 1974; Label: Stax Records	–
Easy Now	Released: 1977; Label: Brass Dolphin Records	–
The Hobbit (Rankin/Bass NBC Soundtrack)	Released: 1977; Label: Buena Vista Records	–
Family Portrait	Released: 1994; Label: Folk Era Records	–
Christmas with Glenn Yarbrough	Released: 1995; Label: Folk Era Records	–
Love for Life	Released: 1995; Label: Folk Era Records	–
Divine Love	Released: 1995; Label: Folk Era Records	–
I Could Have Been a Sailor	Released: 1995; Label: Folk Era Records	–
Glenn & Holly Yarbrough Sing Annie Get Your Gun	Released: 1997; Label: Folk Era Records	–
Day the Tall Ships Came	Released: 2000; Label: Folk Era Records	–
Chantyman	Released: 2000; Label: Folk Era Records	–
"—" denotes a recording that did not chart or was not released in that territory.

==== With the Limeliters ====
- 1960 The Limeliters
- 1960 Tonight: In Person
- 1961 The Slightly Fabulous Limeliters
- 1962 Sing Out!
- 1962 Through Children's Eyes
- 1962 Folk Matinee
- 1962 Our Men in San Francisco
- 1963 Makin' a Joyful Noise
- 1963 Fourteen 14K Folk Songs
- 1964 The Best of The Limeliters
- 1964 The London Concert
- 1968 Time to Gather Seeds
- 1974 The Limeliters Reunion Volume One
- 1974 The Limeliters Reunion Volume Two
- 1976 Glenn Yarbrough and The Limeliters Chicago tape I (released early 2000s (decade))
- 1976 Glenn Yarbrough and The Limeliters Chicago tape II (released in the early 2000s (decade))
- 1977 Pure Gold
- 1993 Joy Across the Land Glenn Yarbrough and The Limeliters
- 2001 Recently Found– Glenn Yarbrough and The Limeliters Chicago Tapes I and II

=== Singles ===
List of singles, with selected chart positions
Title	Year	Peak chart positions		B-side	Album
Title	Year	US	AC	B-side	Album
"Here We Go, Baby"	1957	–	–	"All My Sorrows"	Songs by Glenn Yarbrough
"San Francisco Bay Blues"	1964	–	–	"The Honey Wind Blows"	Time to Move On
"Jenny's Gone and I Don't Care"	1964	–	–	"An Acre of Gal to a Foot of Ground"	Let the World Go By
"Baby the Rain Must Fall"	1965	12	2	"I've Been to Town"	Baby the Rain Must Fall
"It's Gonna Be Fine"	1965	54	9	"She"	Baby the Rain Must Fall
"Ain't No Way"	1965	–	–	"You Can't Ever Go Home Again"	
"The Lonely Things"	1966	–	–	"Channing Way 2"	The Lonely Things
"Spin Spin"	1966	–	–	"Love Are Wine"	
"Gently Here Beside Me"	1967	–	–	"Golden Under the Sun"	For Emily, Whenever I May Find Her
"Honey and Wine"	1967	–	–	"Ain't You Glad You're Livin', Joe"	Honey and Wine
"Times Gone By"	1968	–	–	"Face in the Crowd"	The Bitter and the Sweet
"Downtown L.A."	1968	–	–	"Until You Happened to Pass By"	Let Me Choose Life
"Somehow, Someway"	1969	–	–	"Child of the Night Time"	
"(Don't Let the Sun Shine on You) In Tulsa"	1969	–	–	"Wisconsin"	
"Jubilee"	1970	–	–	"I Wish I Knew How It Would Feel to Be Free"	
"Goodbye Girl"	1970	–	35		Let Me Choose Life
"—" denotes a recording that did not chart or was not released in that territory.

== See also ==
- The Slightly Fabulous Limeliters
- Our Men in San Francisco
