= Louis Gottlieb =

American musician

- Born: August 10, 1923
- Died: July 11, 1996 (aged 72) Sebastopol, California, United States
- Genres: Folk music
- Occupation: Musician
- Instrument: Bass

Louis Gottlieb (August 10, 1923 – July 11, 1996) credited as Lou Gottlieb, was an American bassist and comic spokesman for music trio The Limeliters. He held a PhD in musicology and was considered one of the so-called "new comedy" performers, a new generation of unabashed intellectuals that also included Mort Sahl, Nichols and May, and Lenny Bruce. In 1966 he established the Morningstar Commune, a community that he declared open to all people and which later became central to a legal dispute related to the ethics of ownership of land.

== Early life ==
Gottlieb grew up in La Crescenta, California, completed his B.A. degree at UCLA, and a Ph.D. degree in music at U.C. Berkeley in 1958. During the 1950s he performed as jazz pianist and arranged music for the Kingston Trio. He also sang with the Gateway Singers, and acknowledged the skill and contribution of Elmerlee Thomas, a black woman vocalist in the group. This assumed significance when a scheduled performance of the Ed Sullivan Show was cancelled at the last minute because the network "refused to put on a racially mixed group."

== The Limeliters ==
In 1959 Gottlieb saw Alex Hassilev and Glenn Yarbrough singing together at Hollywood's Cosmo Alley nightclub. Initially, Gottlieb suggested that the three of them work together arranging material for the Kingston Trio but they decided to form a group called The Limeliters after the Limelite Club in Aspen, Colorado. In July 1959, The Limeliters appeared as a trio for the first time at the hungry i in San Francisco, with Gottlieb as "the comic-arranger-musicologist, Glenn the golden-voiced tenor and guitarist, and Alex the instrumental virtuoso" (to quote from one of their song collections, "Cheek In Our Tongue"). Gottlieb's trademark on stage was a burlesquing of the university pedant, the sort of teacher who knocks himself out over the jokes in Chaucer while his class has nothing on its collective mind earlier than last night's date. "Many of the things I have been enthusiastic about," said Gottlieb, "mean absolutely nothing to most people." Cary Ginell in All Music Guide, noted that "Gottlieb's role as master of ceremonies greatly enhanced the group's stage presence, peppering the act with scholarly witticisms, wry asides, and zany non-sequiturs."

San Francisco music critic John L. Wasserman has been quoted as saying that the Limeliters "attained a stature equalled perhaps only by The Kingston Trio and The Weavers." The group's biggest hit was "A Dollar Down" in 1961, but it was well known for its 15 albums and its concerts during the 1960s. After surviving a near-fatal plane crash near the Provo airport in December 1962, the members of the group reassessed their careers and pursued solo projects. Gottlieb had grown tired of life on the road and suffered from what he called a "crisis of pessimism." However, during the 1970s, The Limeliters embarked on a series of yearly reunion tours with Glenn Yarbrough. These were so successful that Gottlieb and Hassilev decided in 1981 to get back into the mainstream of entertainment. It was then they introduced a new tenor, Red Grammer, and another come-back began.

== Morningstar commune ==
During a brief stint reviewing concerts for the San Francisco Chronicle, Gottlieb reviewed a "Beethoven piano recital ('great virtuosos are like bullfighters - they thrive on danger'), a Hummel quartet ('I don't foresee a Hummel renaissance in the near future') and a Richard Strauss orchestral piece ('Joseph Krips seemed to be conducting some ideal performance which was not coming out of the orchestra.')." In 1966 Gottlieb moved to Morning Star Ranch, his 30-acre (120,000 m^{2}) property in Sonoma County. Folk singer Malvina Reynolds and her husband Bud had alerted him to the property, which was also known as "The Digger Farm". Gottlieb referred to himself as the "resident piano player". Gottlieb's Morning Star Ranch attracted a shifting population of young people, later to be known as hippies, who were dissatisfied with the world they had inherited and were determined to create a better one. An article by Ralph Gleason quotes Gottlieb as saying that the hippies were "the first wave of an approaching ocean of technologically unemployable people created by snowballing cybernation in American industry."

In 1968 he attempted to leave the land he owned to God, aligning this to the "creation of a new society inspired by ethics, security and love..." arguing that, "...free access to land would reduce the problem of human conflict, by eliminating 'the territorial imperative'." But after a series of appeals, the 9th district court ruled that he could not because "if God was named owner on a quit claim deed, there would be no recourse for the collection of property taxes." During this process, Gottlieb coined the acronym LATWIDNO (Land Access To Which Is Denied No One) which it has been suggested could be seen as "exposing a muddle of contradictions underlying American society and law...[specifically]...the absence of recourse guided by ethics within [the] current legal system." During the last years of his life Gottlieb returned to live in a shed without electricity at Morningstar to play his piano.

Possible plans to sell the property in 2011 caused dismay amongst some former residents, including Paula Oandasan who acknowledged that while "there are still varying opinions of Morningstar, depending on who you talk to...as for myself, I learned so much at Morningstar — how to cook for over 100 people, how to love people who were very different from me, how to accept many religions and so much more. Morningstar formed my life." However in 2018, Gottlieb's children who had inherited the ranch put it on the market with an asking price of $2.5 million US.

== Discography ==
- Lucky Lou (West Knoll Records, 1987)

== Movie roles ==
Gottlieb performed in the 1968 movie I Love You, Alice B. Toklas with Peter Sellers, and in Blume in Love with George Segal in 1973.

== Awards ==
In 1995, Gottlieb received the World Folk Music Association Lifetime Achievement Award.

== Death ==
Gottlieb died after a short illness on July 11, 1996, in Sebastopol, California, at the age of 72.
