= Alex Hassilev =

American folk musician (1932–2024)

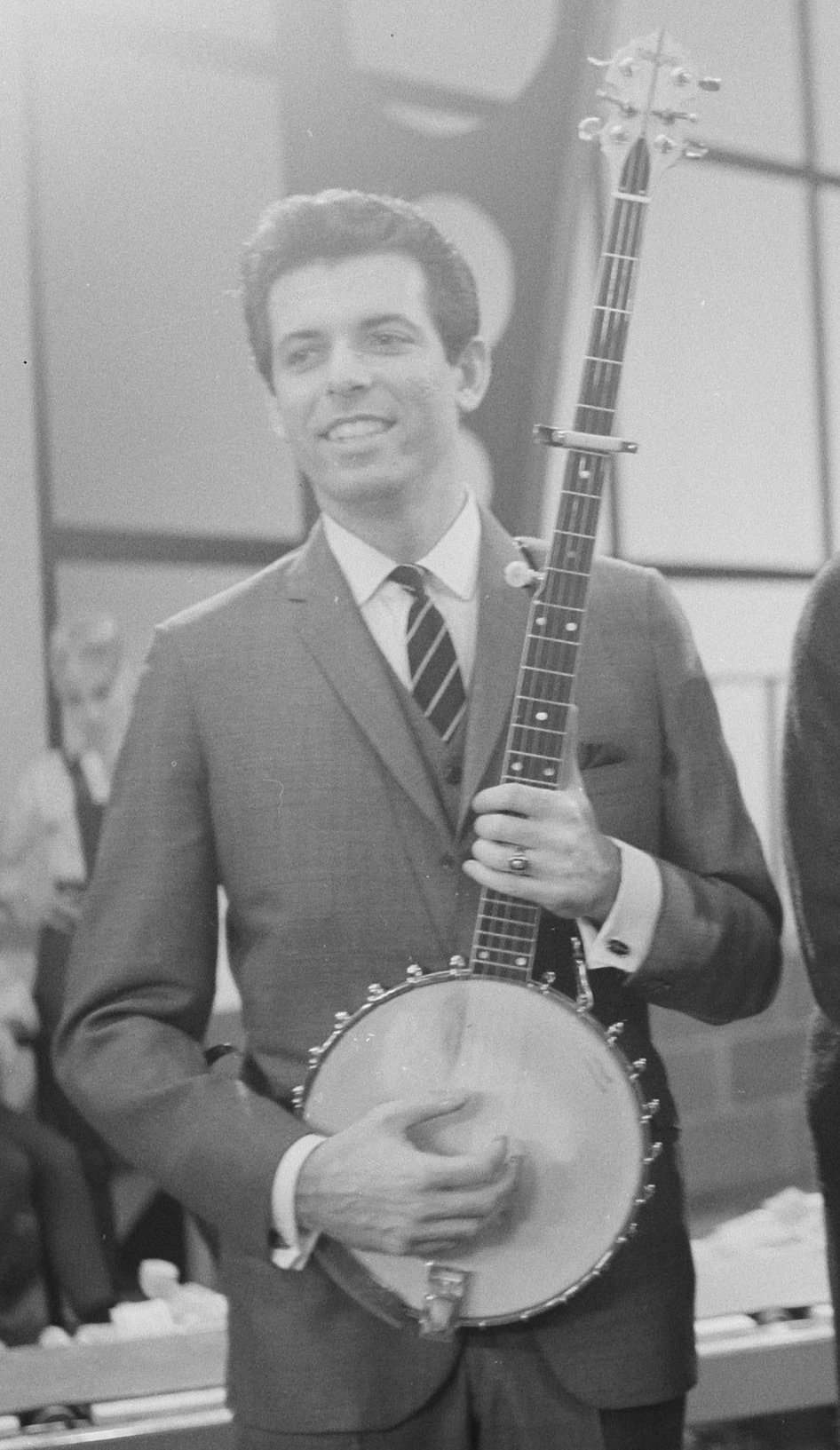
- Hassilev in 1963

Background information
- Born: July 11, 1932; Paris, France
- Died: April 21, 2024 (aged 91) Burbank, California, U.S.
- Genres: Folk
- Occupation: Singer
- Instruments: Vocals, guitar, five-string banjo
- Labels: RCA Victor
- Formerly of: The Limeliters

Alex Hassilev (July 11, 1932 – April 21, 2024) was an American folk musician who was one of the founding members of the group The Limeliters. Educated at Harvard and the University of Chicago, he was also an actor with a number of film and television appearances to his credit. As a musician he played the guitar and the banjo and was fluent in several languages. After retiring from the Limeliters, Hassilev remained active in the field of record production.

== Early life ==
Hassilev was born in France, of Russian heritage, and educated at the University of Chicago and Harvard. He spoke fluent French, Portuguese, Spanish and Russian and "could sing in over a dozen languages". After a tour of duty in the U.S. Army, Hassilev did some acting and was credited with a role as singer-guitarist in the 1959 movie A Bucket of Blood. Hassilev has said of this movie, that "unlike most films the horror in this movie was intentional." He later reflected that he only attended Harvard because [his parents] "considered it the status school ... [but]. ... considers himself to be the antithesis of the Ivy League folk singer".

In the late 1950s, Hassilev joined Glenn Yarbrough as a lessee of a club in Aspen, Colorado, called the Limelite, and later the two performed regularly. At one of their shows at the Cosmo Alley, Hassilev and Yarbrough impressed Lou Gottlieb, an original member of the Gateway Singers who had also written several musical arrangements for the Kingston Trio. At that time Gottlieb, had "just completed his doctoral thesis on 15th century cyclic masses ... [and] ... suggested that the three of them team up to make demos for the Kingston Trio, with Gottlieb himself providing arrangements of traditional folk songs and some original material". They later named themselves after the Limelite club owned by Yarbrough and Hassilev.

== The Limeliters ==
Between 1961 and 1963, the Limeliters made many appearances on television, recorded several albums and toured exhaustively. Early in the career of the Limeliters, Hassilev said that the group didn't perform "just any old folk songs ... [but the kind] ... that might be looked on as a form of group therapy for unashamed eggheads." In the same article, however, he did confirm that the Limeliters were "collectors of authentic folk music ... [maintaining] ... that the real function of the folk song is a social function; serving as a comment, as a kind of group reflection on events". Hassilev was seen at the time as the "dark-haired, banjo-playing baritone ... a combination musician, actor and linguist ... [switching on stage] ... from the guitar to the five-string banjo with the relaxed ease of a virtuoso". It is claimed that on a national tour with Mort Sahl in 1961, the Limeliters performed for an audience of 125,000 in 30 cities in the United States. Hassilev noted that it was surprising how three such diverse personalities got together and continued to play their music successfully. The author of the same article, said that in spite of violating "the folk-singing code of haberdashery ... instead of slacks and Ivy League shirts ... [appearing in] ...natty suits, white shirts and dark ties ... as contradictory as these ingredients might seem against the tested formalae of success, the Limeliters [were] a thumping hit".

After a 1963 concert in Saskatchewan, a local newspaper said the Limeliters "won over all of the huge audience ... [and] ... were called back for a solid 30 minutes of encores". It was noted that during the show, Hassilev looked exhausted until he performed the song "The Monks of St. Bernard" in a "relaxed and polished manner ... punctuated by hilarious interjections from the other two-thirds of the trio".

The group survived a near-catastrophic plane crash in 1962, and this resulted in Yarbrough reassessing his priorities and leaving the group soon after. Ernie Sheldon filled in for Yarbrough before the group finally disbanded in 1965.

By 1964 with the future of the Limeliters uncertain, Hassilev, while continuing to see himself as a performer, said he was not interested in folk music as a career, instead moving to acting and singing on Broadway – including musical comedy, something he saw as "a logical extension of his career". He admitted to being confused about his vocal style after the Limeliters broke up and his first solo album Alex Hassilev Man of the World was a blend of jazz, pop and folk. He accepted that his new direction might be difficult for his fans to come to terms with, and for it to succeed, he needed "a little luck, talent, self-discipline and a lot of guts". Hassilev returned to acting in 1966 with a role as a character called Christopher in an episode from the Get Smart TV series called "The Only Way to Die", and in 1966 as a character called Hrushevsky in the movie The Russians Are Coming, the Russians Are Coming.

The original group did get back together temporarily to record an album, Time to Gather Seeds in 1966. A reviewer said that Hassilev had recorded the tracks using top session musicians at a studio in his home, resulting in "a batch of songs that lack the unity and cohesion that defined the combo's former selves ... [and that] ... some longtime fans and enthusiasts of the early Limeliters were undoubtedly nonplussed when faced with the band's attempts to revise their image." The same writer concluded that "during their hiatus, folk music would become diffused as one of the myriad of components informing late-'60s rock & roll. The Limeliters' modernization leans on concurrent styles, trends, and conventions. The results were understandably mixed and simply unable to live up to the anticipation or hype of the reunion".

The Limeliters had numerous reunion tours throughout the 1970s. Despite having only rehearsed for a short period of time, in 1973 their music was said by one critic to be "tighter than ever ... one supposed it's like tennis or riding a bike - as long as you don't try anything tricky, the basic skill stays with you". In the same article, Hassilev's intelligence was described as "vivacious and extremely energetic ... [and] ... the way he picks up his banjo - like putting a leash on a trained and trusted dog - makes you wonder how he's going to sustain interest in any but the money (and nostalgic) aspects of the tour". Before a reunion concert scheduled for June 1973 at Tampa's McKay Auditorium in St. Peters, Hasseliv said he didn't recall playing there with the original group almost 10 years previously, noting that those times were "unsettling" for the group, but "now things have changed" and he was looking forward to the venue. He also explained how the group now had nine members and the show was called Glenn Yarbrough and the Limeliters Reunion, 1974, not that it was being nostalgic, but the band had been added to "back up Glenn's voice and to bring the show musically into the 20th century." Of the reunions, Hassilev commented in 1975 that the Limeliter's freshness resulted from "one of our main assets since we began - the energy we put out on stage ... I think this energy and the fact that we are all schooled musicians are the main incentives behind our reunion".

After the end of the 1973 tour, Gottlieb in his role as a critic, reported in the San Francisco Examiner that Hassilev had been working with Mike Settle and Dave Guard. After seeing their show, Gottlieb concluded that "working with Dave and Mike has had a miraculously rejuvenatory effect on Alex ... his contribution to the work of this unit is evident - a secure sense of form - I mean, a spacing in their arrangements of the presentations of ideas which makes for the greatest possible clarity".

In the early 1980s, Hassilev and Gottlieb wanted to keep the Limeliters together on a more full-time basis and brought on tenor Red Grammer to replace Yarbrough. The Limeliters asked to perform at a series of Sunday night folk concerts known as Bound for Glory in 1985, an attempt according to Hassilev, "to start making contact with the folk and acoustic music community, which we've never had ... we kind of shot to stardom and were never part of that whole folk music scene, so we decided to go back to a more folky and socially relevant kind of show, playing folk clubs".

By 2000 the Limeliters had undergone considerable changes. In about 1990, Grammer left to devote more time to a career as a singer of children's songs, and was replaced by Rick Dougherty who was a multi-instrumentalist and experienced performer. In 1996, Gottlieb died of cancer and Bill Zorn who had played for the Kingston Trio and the New Christy Minstrels, joined the group. Dougherty and Zorn left in 2003. After Zorn and Dougherty left the group, Hassilev brought on Mack Bailey and Andy Corwin to take their spot in the Limeliters.

== Later life and death ==
Hassilev retired from the Limeliters in 2006, but occasionally made a special appearance with the group. He died of cancer at Providence Saint Joseph Medical Center in Burbank, California, on April 21, 2024, at the age of 91.
